= Lance Wallnau =

American preacher

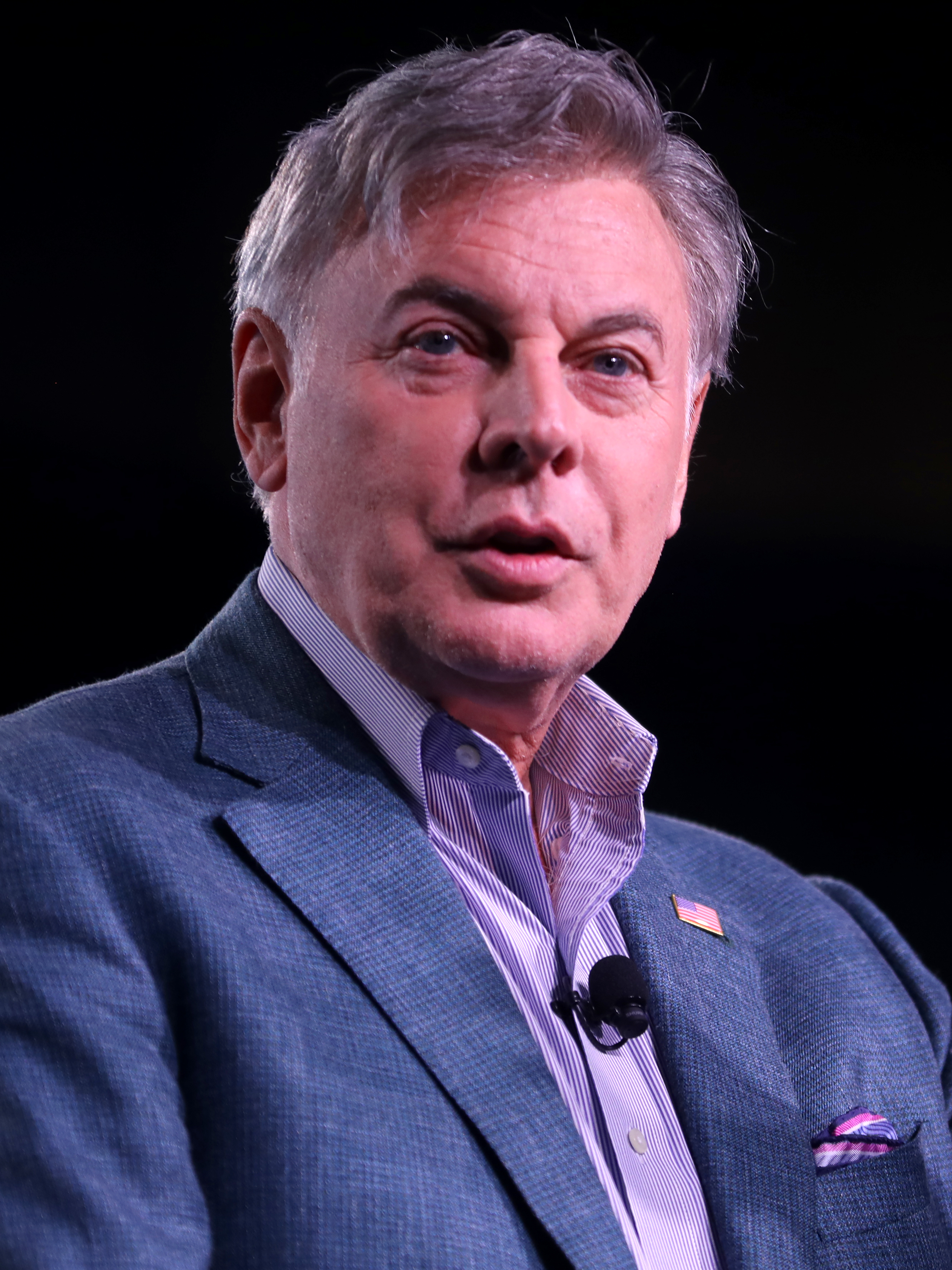
- Wallnau in 2023
- Born: 1955 or 1956 (age 70–71)
- Education: Valley Forge Military Academy and College; Lebanon Valley College
- Occupations: Evangelical preacher; televangelist
- Organization: Ziklag
- Known for: Popularization of Donald Trump as a modern-day biblical King Cyrus
- Notable work: God's Chaos Candidate (2016)
- Television: The Lance Wallnau Show
- Movement: Dominion theology; Christian nationalism; New Apostolic Reformation; Seven Mountain Mandate; Make America Great Again
- Spouse: Annabelle Wallnau
- Father: Carl Wallnau
- Website: lancewallnau.com

Lance Wallnau (born 1955/56) is an American evangelical preacher and televangelist based in Dallas, Texas. He is associated with the New Apostolic Reformation (NAR) and the Seven Mountain Mandate.

Wallnau has been referred to as the "father of American Dominionism" by the Baptist Joint Committee for Religious Liberty. A self-described Christian nationalist, he is known for popularizing the concept of Donald Trump as a modern-day biblical King Cyrus from the Book of Isaiah. Religion scholar Matthew D. Taylor describes Wallnau in 2024 as one of the chief propagandists of the Christian Make America Great Again (MAGA) movement, and the most consequential evangelical Christian figure of the 21st century.

== Biography ==
Wallnau was born to a mechanical engineer and Air Force major Carl Wallnau and grew up in Pennsylvania. He attended Valley Forge Military Academy and College and Lebanon Valley College and found the Christian faith during that period. Wallnau also worked in oil marketing in Texas for a time. Esther Mallett, a figure in the Pentecostal Latter Rain movement, was a primary spiritual influence on Wallnau, introducing him to the world of modern-day apostles and prophets. In the 1990s she made him pastor of a church, and in the following years he started marketing and publishing companies while also working as a motivational speaker and consultant. In 1996, Wallnau and his wife founded Lance Wallnau Ministries.

The New Apostolic Reformation (NAR), which Wallnau is associated with, is a loosely organized neo-Charismatic Christian dominionist movement. Scholar André Gagné calls Wallnau "the best example" of the NAR. Wallnau is a member of the Eagles' Vision Apostolic Team, a group of leaders associated with the NAR. Within the movement, he is considered a prophet.

During a meeting between Youth With a Mission founder Loren Cunningham and Wallnau in 2000, Cunningham told Wallnau about a message he had received from God in 1975. Others who purportedly were given the same message were Bill Bright (founder of Campus Crusade for Christ) and theologian Francis Schaeffer. They were ordered to conquer the "seven spheres" of society identified as family, religion, education, media, entertainment, business, and government. The concept would later be termed the Seven Mountain Mandate. In 2001, Wallnau met NAR leader C. Peter Wagner, who became his spiritual mentor and invited Wallnau to teach the Seven Mountains concept to his International Coalition of Apostolic Leaders, the belief spread widely through other spiritual leaders in the network, such as Chuck Pierce, Cindy Jacobs, and Dutch Sheets. Wallnau also began to speak on the topic to churches, businesses, and municipalities; the movement came to prominence after the 2013 publication of Wallnau's and Bill Johnson's book Invading Babylon: The 7 Mountain Mandate.

Wallnau's influence began to grow in 2015, the year he stated that God asked him to support US presidential candidate Donald Trump. The following year, he published an article in Charisma magazine entitled "Why I Believe Trump Is the Prophesied President" and around the same time released a book called God's Chaos Candidate in which he prophesied that Donald Trump would win the election. During the Trump administration, Wallnau was regularly welcomed at the White House, the US State Department and Mar-a-Lago resort.

He is an advisor to and a force behind the non-profit Christian dominionist organization Ziklag. Additionally, he is a co-founder of the Truth and Liberty Coalition, another dominionist organization, along with TV evangelist Andrew Wommack, David Barton, and others. Wallnau has been a speaker at the organization's events.

Wallnau has his own television program on Daystar Television Network,The Lance Wallnau Show, and a podcast of the same name. He also commonly appears on Kenneth Copeland's prophecy program FlashPoint.

In 2024, Wallnau headlined the Courage Tour, featuring prophets and Charismatic preachers promoting the Trump campaign and Make America Great Again (MAGA) ideas. The event visited 19 bellwether counties in nine states and focused on political mobilization within a spiritual warfare context.

== Views ==
=== Trump as King Cyrus figure ===
Since 2015, Wallnau has been a supporter of Donald Trump and is known for popularizing the concept of Trump as a modern-day biblical King Cyrus, from the Book of Isaiah, chapter 45. Cyrus—seen as anointed by God—freed the Jewish people from Babylonian captivity while not himself a believer in their faith. Wallnau holds that Cyrus is an archetype of a secular political leader chosen by God. He later came to the belief that there have been many previous iterations worldwide, including "George Washington, Abraham Lincoln, Winston Churchill, Margaret Thatcher and Ronald Reagan", with Trump as the current American Cyrus figure, and others such as Viktor Orbán, Andrzej Duda, and Jair Bolsonaro in other countries. Additionally, Wallnau contends that Trump will help reconstruct the United States and prevent cultural collapse, thereby bringing the apostolic reformation, rechristianization, and stability to other countries with the help of "anointed" Christians. Regarding Trump, Wallnau has stated "he is like a Reformer in secular garb" and links the 45th president to the 45th chapter of Isaiah. The concept soon became part of the NAR belief. In 2019, Wallnau appeared on the Jim Bakker Show and sold a gold coin with Cyrus and Trump on it.

Other Christian leaders such as Beth Moore have publicly taken issue with Wallnau's characterization, stating "[w]e can't sanctify idolatry by labeling a leader our Cyrus. We need no Cyrus. We have a king. His name is Jesus."

=== Dominionism ===
Regarding the ekklesia or Christian Church, Wallnau states:

The word for 'church' in the New Testament is the word ecclesia. The world of Jesus' day knew this word as it was used throughout the Roman empire to refer to the method of civil governing by political bodies. The word was used as far back as the time of Alexander the Great to describe the governing bodies of Greek city states. The ecclesia is a governing word describing a governing body of believers called out as citizens of the kingdom to take their seats at the gates! What gates? The gates of influence that shape the cities and nations of the earth.

Wallnau told followers in 2011:

If you're talking to a secular audience you don't talk about having dominion over them. This whole idea of taking over and that language of takeover, it doesn't actually help. It's good for preaching to the choir and it's shorthand if we interpret it right, but it's very bad for media."

=== Spiritual warfare ===
Common to the NAR is a belief in waging spiritual warfare against perceived demonic spirits; Wallnau has referred to Trump's presidency as a "spiritual warfare presidency" and Kamala Harris as a "Jezebel spirit". In a Facebook video, he warned followers that Harris had been sent by the Devil to "take Trump out." He has claimed that "the left is loaded with demons". Wallnau and other NAR leaders such as Cindy Jacobs were part of the 2020 Jericho Marches; sociologist Brad Christerson argues that these prophets and their spiritual warfare theology shaped the events.

=== January 6, 2021 Capitol attack ===
Religion scholar Matthew D. Taylor has referred to Wallnau as "one of the key Christian mobilizers for January 6th". After Trump lost the 2020 US presidential election, Wallnau claimed that the election had been stolen from him. He defended the January 6 attack against the US Capitol, stating, "Jan. 6 was not an insurrection. It was an election fraud intervention." He was the only Christian leader from the riots who, as of 2024, had refused to condemn the violence.

A joint report from the Baptist Joint Committee for Religious Liberty and the Freedom From Religion Foundation on the role of Christian nationalism in the January 6, 2021 Capitol attack argues that Wallnau's "warfare rhetoric" is linked to stochastic terrorism. Scholar Arne Helgen Teigen notes "nationalist", "anti-democratic", and "fascist" traits in Wallnau's prophethood.

=== NAR leaders ===
Wallnau prophesied in 2010 regarding Norwegian apostolic leader Jan-Aage Torp's divine calling and influence.

== Works ==
- The 7 Mountain Mandate: Impacting Culture, Discipling Nations. Fort Mill, South Carolina: MorningStar Ministries. DVD. 2009.
- Invading Babylon: The 7 Mountain Mandate. With Bill Johnson. Shippensburg, Pennsylvania: Destiny Image Publishers. 2013.
- God's Chaos Candidate: Donald J. Trump and the American Unraveling. Keller, Texas: Killer Sheep Media. 2016.
- God's Chaos Code: The Shocking Blueprint that Reveals 5 Keys to the Destiny of Nations. Keller, Texas: Killer Sheep Media. 2020.

== See also ==
- Apostolic-Prophetic Movement
- Independent Network Charismatic Christianity
- Christian reconstructionism
- Christian supremacy
- Trumpism
- The Trump Prophecy
