= Sean Feucht =

American Christian worship leader and political activist

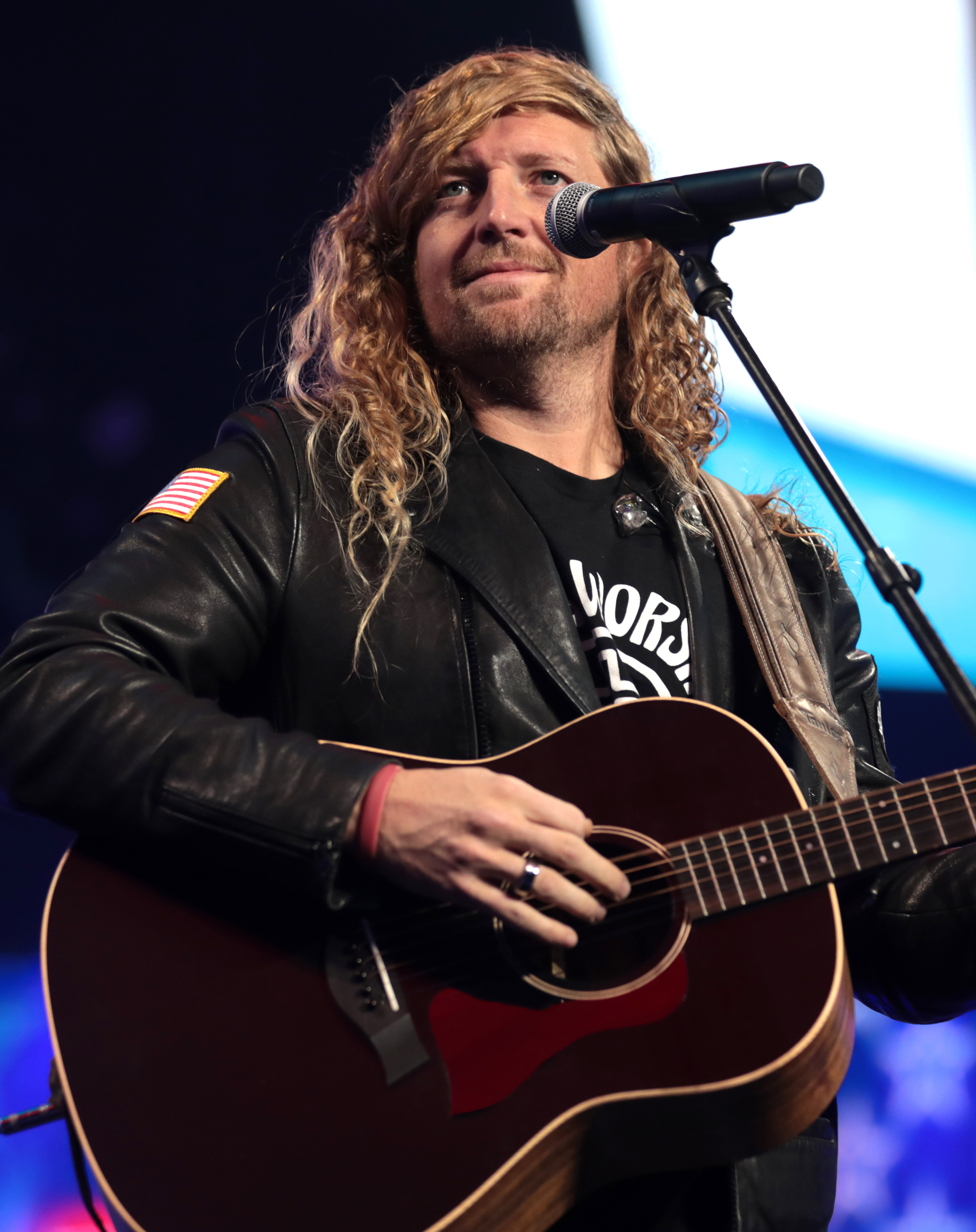
- Feucht performing in 2021

Background information
- Born: 1983 (age 42–43); Montana
- Genre: Contemporary worship music
- Occupations: Political candidate, conservative activist, singer, songwriter, worship leader
- Instrument: Guitar
- Label: Bethel Music
- Website: www.seanfeucht.com

John Christopher "Sean" Feucht (born 1983) is an American Christian singer, songwriter, former worship leader at Bethel Church, and the founder of the Let Us Worship movement. He unsuccessfully ran as a Republican in California's 3rd congressional district primary in 2020.

After running for Congress, Feucht hosted large outdoor worship gatherings to protest government restrictions put in place during the COVID-19 pandemic. He has been described in the media as "a worship leader from the epicenter of the New Apostolic Reformation movement", and a "[promoter of] Christian dominionism".

== Biography ==
Feucht was born in Montana, the son of a dermatologist. He began playing music and leading church youth group worship in his teenage years. New Apostolic Reformation (NAR) prophet Lou Engle's recordings of prayers and prophecies made an impact on Feucht in the late 1990s; he was part of Engle and NAR apostle Ché Ahn's prayer rallies, TheCall, in the 2000s. Ahn and Engle became spiritual mentors to Feucht.

Feucht founded Burn 24-7, a prayer and worship movement, in 2005 while attending Oral Roberts University, and Light a Candle in 2010, an international outreach movement which hosts short term mission trips and child sponsorships. He also founded Hold the Line, a movement intended "to inform, educate, and inspire" young people to become politically active and oppose "the progressive agenda being forced upon America."

=== 2020 congressional campaign ===
Feucht ran as a Republican for California's 3rd congressional district in 2020, coming in third place with 14% of the votes, finishing behind John Garamendi and Tamika Hamilton in the March 3 primary. Feucht ran a socially conservative campaign, which was against high taxes and staunchly critical of abortion calling it "the slaughter of the unborn and the newborn." Other issues he wanted to focus on included homelessness and affordable housing in California, and expanded parental rights regarding mandatory vaccination and sex education.

=== Political activism ===
Feucht and 50 other worship leaders visited President Donald Trump for a faith briefing at the White House amid the run-up to the first impeachment of Trump in December 2019. Feucht said of the event, "We just laid our hands on him and prayed for him. It was like a real intense, hardcore prayer."

==== Origins of Let Us Worship concerts ====
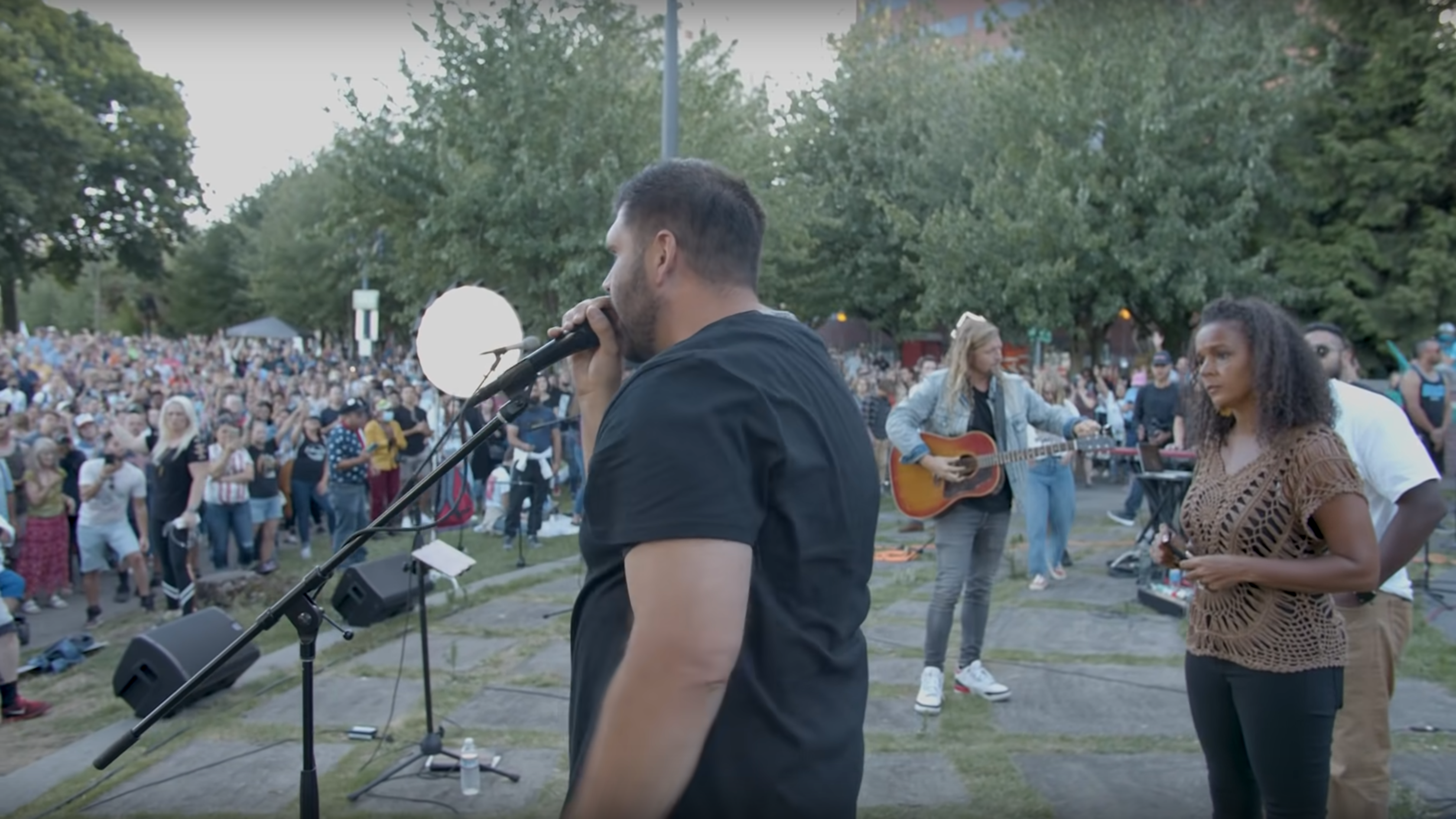
Sean Feucht with speakers at a concert in Portland, Oregon.

During the latter half of 2020, when the COVID-19 pandemic was ongoing, Feucht arranged worship concerts across the United States that drew crowds of thousands to protest government restrictions on people gathering during COVID-19 lockdowns. These concerts were later expanded to focus on cities with George Floyd protests to respond to Black Lives Matter (BLM) protesters. Feucht labeled the movement Let Us Worship. Feucht stated, "We just feel this call to really target cities that are under extreme turmoil and despair and brokenness;" he said, asserting it was a new Jesus Movement. Bethel Church, where Feucht is a worship leader, did not financially support him but wrote a statement of support for his movement and vision.

==== Problems with permits for concerts ====
In September 2020, Feucht attempted to hold a Labor Day "prayer rally" at Seattle's Gas Works Park. When the city closed the park, he held the rally in the street across from the park. Feucht originally failed to get a permit, but the city allowed the rally when he called it a "worship protest." Later that month, following a concert in Kenosha, Wisconsin, the site of the Kenosha protests, Feucht was prevented from holding a concert on the South Side of Chicago after police threatened to take action against him for not having a permit for the event.

==== Concerts in response to racial and political unrest ====
In June 2020, Feucht held a worship concert at the site of the murder of George Floyd in Minneapolis, Minnesota, calling it the "Minneapolis miracle" and the "HOPE RALLY." Feucht called Floyd's murder an "injustice" and referred to it as "the trauma" and was critical of Black Lives Matter's support for identity politics in online posts prior to the worship session.

In August 2020, Feucht led worship concerts called "Riots to Revival" in Portland, Oregon, and Seattle, Washington. The sites of the concerts had recently been the sites of major protests and riots, including Seattle's Cal Anderson Park which had been part of the territory controlled by the Capitol Hill Organized Protest. Feucht claimed that between 4,000 and 7,000 attended the concert in Portland.

==== Claims of political censorship ====
Following the June 2020 concert in Minneapolis, Feucht stated on Twitter afterwards that he and senior Bethel pastor Beni Johnson were censored by Twitter and Instagram for sharing videos of the events and posting Bible verses. His posts were shared by Senator Josh Hawley who stated "Cancel culture meets #BigTech. Now @instagram is censoring a Christian worship leader who wants to post videos of praise and worship from places where there has recently been unrest."

==== Political concerts ====
In September 2021, Feucht held a Let Us Worship memorial service for the September 11 attacks in Washington D.C., with former president Donald Trump giving a prerecorded address. The following day, worshippers walked around the city praying at the White House, the Supreme Court Building, the Lincoln Memorial, and other landmarks.

During the 2022 congressional elections, Feucht performed at campaign rallies in support of Kari Lake and Doug Mastriano.

In early 2023, Feucht announced a "Kingdom to the Capitol" tour, co-sponsored by Turning Point USA. The purpose of the tour is to visit every state capital, with swing states being the focus in the 2024 election year. In response to this tour, dozens of religious leaders in the Pacific Northwest wrote a public letter denouncing him for "advancing LGBTQ+ bigotry in the language of religion." They were responding to Feucht's comments describing drag queens as "demonic, sick, [and] twisted" and arguing that they were "perverting the minds of children." The tour's last event will be held at the National Mall.

==== ReAwaken America tour ====
Feucht has been an active participant in the ReAwaken America tour founded by Clay Clark and sponsored by Charisma News. At the August 2022 tour event in Batavia, New York, Feucht denounced "gender confusion [and] sexual perversion" among young people.

==== Disney protest ====
In April 2022, Feucht helped lead a protest against The Walt Disney Company for its opposition to anti-LGBTQ legislation.

==== Christian persecution and spiritual warfare aspects ====
At a Pennsylvania Kingdom to the Capitol tour rally in October 2024, Feucht stated that Christians have "abdicated authority" and that the Christian nationalist event "is actually not even political... This is actually the most biblical thing you can ever do." Feucht states Christian persecution in the US is greater than that of other countries such as North Korea and Afghanistan, saying, "I have never endured the spiritual warfare that I have in the last two years of going to every capital in our nation". Matthew D. Taylor calls his claims part of a 'Christian persecution neurosis' or 'complex' and criticizes Feucht for comparing Christians in the US to those receiving what he calls actual persecution in other countries that serve to motivate pushes for Christian dominance or supremacy.

Feucht has claimed the popularity of Kamala Harris and Tim Walz' 2024 campaign is due to demonic forces, ascribing it to "some serious demonic sorcery witchcraft thing" and stating that "they go to churches that are synagogues of Satan."

== Criticism and controversy ==
Matthew D. Taylor criticized Feucht's use of rhetoric and tactics that he worries puts people in danger from violence as well as his promotion of the ideas and rhetoric of Christian supremacy that evokes images of a guerilla warfare campaign that are incompatible with democracy. He also criticized Feucht's association with Proud Boys and other extreme right-wing militia members, calling him "Goliath with a David complex."

In June 2025, Feucht was accused of "longstanding and serious moral, ethical, financial, organizational and governance failures" by a group of former employees associated with Burn 24/7, Light a Candle, and Let Us Worship.

== Personal life ==
As of 2020, Feucht has a wife, Kate, and four children.

== Discography ==
=== Studio albums ===
List of albums, with selected chart positions
Title	Album details	Peak chart positions
Title	Album details	US Christ.
Caught In the Flow	Released: January 9, 2009; Label: Self-published; Format: CD, digital download, streaming	—
Rebirth and Reclamation	Released: September 24, 2009; Label: Self-published; Format: CD, digital download, streaming	—
Your Presence Is Enough	Released: May 22, 2010; Label: Self-published; Format: CD, digital download, streaming	—
Keep This Love Alive	Released: January 1, 2011; Label: Self-published; Format: CD, digital download, streaming	—
Songs for Nations	Released: July 20, 2012; Label: Self-published; Format: CD, digital download, streaming	—
Messengers	Released: May 29, 2014; Label: Self-published; Format: CD, digital download, streaming	—
Sacred Mountains	Collaborative album with United Pursuit; Released: February 17, 2015; Label: Self-published; Format: CD, digital download, streaming	—
The Things We Did at First	Released: May 17, 2016; Label: Self-published; Format: CD, digital download, streaming	37
Seattle Sessions	Released: August 1, 2018; Label: Self-published; Format: CD, digital download, streaming	—

=== Live albums ===
List of albums, with selected chart positions
Title	Album details	Peak chart positions			
Title	Album details	US Christ.	US Indie	US Heat.	UK C&G
Kingdoms	Released: January 27, 2012; Label: Self-published; Format: CD, digital download, streaming	—	—	—	—
Victorious One – Live at Bethel	Released: April 28, 2015; Label: Self-published; Format: CD, digital download, streaming	—	—	—	—
Wild	Released: November 2, 2018; Label: Bethel Music; Format: CD, digital download, streaming	41	41	9	5
Let Us Worship – Portland	Released: August 24, 2020; Label: Self-published; Format: CD, digital download, streaming	—	—	—	—
Let Us Worship – Sacramento	Released: September 25, 2020; Label: Self-published; Format: CD, digital download, streaming	—	—	—	—
Let Us Worship – Washington, D.C.	Released: November 11, 2020; Label: Self-published; Format: CD, digital download, streaming	38	—	—	—
Let Us Worship – Texas	Released: January 27, 2021; Label: Self-published; Format: CD, digital download, streaming	—	—	—	—
Let Us Worship – Azusa (with Kim Walker-Smith)	Released: March 3, 2021; Label: Self-published; Format: CD, digital download, streaming	33	—	—	—

=== Extended plays ===
- Boundary Lines (2014)
- Let Us Worship – Tulsa (2020)
- Let Us Worship – Seattle (2020)
- Let Us Worship – Los Angeles (2020)
- Let Us Worship – New Jersey (2020)
- Let Us Worship – New York City (2020)
- Let Us Worship – Nashville (2020)
- Boston (2020)

=== Singles ===
List of singles and peak chart positions
Year	Single	Album
2020	"Raise Our Voice"	Non-album single

== Bibliography ==
- Byrd, Andy; — (September 1, 2010). Fire and Fragrance : From the Great Commandment to the Great Commission. Destiny Image Publishers. ISBN 978-0768432909.
- Lucier, Art; Garlington Sr., Joseph; Lockhart, Sandy; Billman, Nic; Brundidge, Caleb; —; Gibson, Vince; Meyer, Julie; Mitchell, Steve; King, Patricia (November 1, 2011). Worship The King: An Inspiring Devotional That Draws the Heart Into His Presence. XP Publishing. ISBN 978-1936101993.
