= Spiritual mapping =

Christian belief

Spiritual mapping refers to the belief among some Christians that specific demons, known as territorial spirits, are associated with specific locations and can be conquered through strategic spiritual warfare by plotting out geographical areas and their perceived problems in order to pray on-site. Spiritual mapping is part of the first of three steps in spiritual warfare, defined by sociologists Brad Christerson and Richard Flory as research, prophecy, and intercession. Religious studies scholar Sean McCloud has referred to spiritual mapping as a "Third Wave [Charismatic] version of geomancy that discerns where and why demons control spaces and places, ranging from houses and neighborhoods to entire countries."

== Concept and history ==
Spiritual mapping is linked to the biblical story in the book of Daniel, chapter 10; an angel tells the prophet Daniel that he battled the "prince of the kingdom of Persia".

The spiritual mapping movement began in 1989, while the term spiritual mapping was coined by missiologist George Otis in his 1991 book Last of the Giants. Community or city transformation and transformational Christianity are also used in relation to spiritual mapping goals as adherents believe they can effect large-scale social change through spiritual warfare. Otis and influential New Apostolic Reformation (NAR) and spiritual warfare leader C. Peter Wagner helped define and spread the concept. Other early figures who were influential in the movement taking form include anthropologist Charles H. Kraft, whose work focused on missions, church growth, and spiritual warfare; NAR prophet and founder of the Generals of Intercession Cindy Jacobs; and NAR evangelist Ed Silvoso. Wagner's parachurch mission organization Global Harvest Ministries was one of the major promoters of the movement; other organizations were involved, such as Sentinel Group, who produced the video series Transformations, and many networks of individuals. Wagner claimed that this type of spiritual warfare was "virtually unknown to the majority of Christians before the 1990s".

Spiritual mapping is part of the broader spiritual warfare concept, particularly common in neo-Charismatic Christian circles such as Independent Network Charismatic Christianity. Spiritual mapping occurs on both the local and regional level with super-demons known as territorial spirits seen as laying claim to whole swathes of the globe. Wagner claimed that a particularly powerful entity known as the Queen of Heaven, for example, controlled the equatorial regions.

Spiritual mapping involves research and prayer, either to locate specific individuals who are then accused of witchcraft, or to locate individuals, groups, or locations that are thought to be victims of witchcraft or possessed by demons, against which spiritual warfare is then waged through prayer. Practitioners note areas on maps with relevant history, spiritual and otherwise, and connect them with lines. "These lines are seen as demonic corridors of power—demons travel back and forth along the transit routes. The connecting lines are seen as a 'demonic stronghold.'" Ley lines, straight lines between buildings or landscape features, are seen as being useful in detecting such demonic strongholds. Prophets then use this information to determine the territorial spirits' names and more specific information about the type of spiritual attacks they believe are occurring in an area. Named demons include Jezebel, Baal, and Leviathan.

This process involves researching a city's history and, through prayer, waiting for spiritually intuitive impressions or visions that 'reveal' a city's spiritual condition. So in Call, Colombia, for example, one of the discerned spirits might be drug addiction; in Portland, Oregon, individualism; and in Jeremie, Haiti, it might be voodoo. These broad characterizations are seen as parallels to biblical characterizations of cities such as Sodom and Gomorrah that had reputations for immorality.

It aims at answering the following three questions, according to Otis:

1. What is wrong with my community?
2. Where did the problem come from?
3. What can be done to change things?

Spiritual mapping traces its roots to the Church Growth movement and Christian missions work. Adherents of spiritual mapping believe that these demons are the reason for lack of success in Christian missions work and that they can use prayer and other religious practices to counteract and drive out these demons. This, in turn, will accelerate the Second Coming of Christ. The Christian missiological concept of the 10/40 window, a region between 10 and 40 degrees north of the equator, found to have high rates of poverty and little access to and conversion to Christianity, is thus part of spiritual mapping. It is seen as one of the last areas to receive the Christian message, therefore requiring much effort to defeat the "last and 'very powerful' undefeated demons" controlling it. The 40/70 window likewise has been seen as an important missions target, with multiple coordinated efforts to spiritually affect the area in the early 2000s. Also underlying the belief in spiritual mapping is the idea that "demonic powers have deceived millions of people by supernaturally animating human systems", as Otis claimed in his 1991 book Last of the Giants. Cities are seen as having their own collective identity which must be addressed through collective Christian prayer and rituals.

One scholar describes the influences on spiritual mapping as a belief:

As a concept and a movement Spiritual Mapping behaved like a symbiont. It did not develop a school or movement of its own but rode waves like the American Dream and Manifest Destiny, their popular spirituality, Neo-Evangelicalism, the Church Growth movement, elements of the Charismatic Renewal and later dominion teaching. It rode the waves of institutes like Fuller's School of World Mission, the AD2000 movement and its 10/40 Window and during its later transformation the wave of the [New Apostolic Reformation].

Spiritual mapping, according to Charles H. Kraft, is based upon a similar worldview to that of animism; both posit that an invisible spirit world is active and that it can be interacted with or controlled, with the Christian belief that such power to control the spirit world comes from God rather than being inherent to objects or places. "The animist believes that rituals and objects contain spiritual power, whereas a Christian believes that rituals and objects may convey power. Animists seek to manipulate power, whereas Christians seek to submit to God and to learn to work with his power."

Wagner was a key figure in the concept's growth. According to The Christian Science Monitor, Wagner "[was] in the vanguard of the spiritual warfare movement." Wagner's basic methodology is to use spiritual mapping to locate areas, demon-possessed persons, occult practitioners such as witches and Freemasons, or things they deem occult idol objects like statues of Catholic saints, which are then named and fought, using methods ranging from intensive prayer to burning with fire. "[T]hey must burn the idols… the kinds of material things that might be bringing honor to the spirits of darkness: pictures, statues, Catholic saints, Books of Mormon, pictures of former lovers…native art, foreign souvenirs... [T]he witches and warlocks had surrounded the area… When the flames shot up, a woman right behind Doris [Wagner's wife] screamed and manifested a demon, which Doris immediately cast out!" Wagner's conceptions about spiritual mapping were opposed by his collaborator Vineyard movement founder John Wimber, with whom he had developed many of his earlier spiritual warfare concepts.

=== Background ===
Spiritual mapping developed through loose Christian networks and can be traced back to the evangelical revival in Argentina beginning in the mid-1970s. Argentinian Baptist pastor Eduardo Lorenzo was one such pastor who sought increased church membership. Youth With a Mission's John Dawson, NAR evangelist Ed Silvoso, and evangelist Carlos Annacondia soon began to engage in missions work in the country. Annacondia's focus on exorcism and Dawson's writing regarding demonically controlled areas gained influence. In 1984, Lorenzo was faced with an unexpected challenge when he met a local woman he believed to be demon-possessed. Members of the church then traveled to the United States to study spiritual warfare techniques and speakers were invited to their church. With this newly gained knowledge, Lorenzo's congregation began to undertake spiritual combat against the demons they believed were present in the area. His church would continue to grow through the late 1980s, which he claimed was due to the use of spiritual warfare methods. Also in 1984, Silvoso and a number of pastors prayed to defeat a demon they believed was controlling a region of Argentina lacking Evangelical churches. He determined that it was due to a local warlock; the group "took back" the area for God through spiritual warfare. The following year, "church growth guru" C. Peter Wagner visited the country and learned about the nascent spiritual mapping as well as spiritual warfare techniques to overcome territorial spirits. The trip made a significant impact on him. Wagner's and Silvoso's promotion of the revival gained the attention of American evangelicals.

The spiritual mapping movement was officially formed in 1989, though the name would not come until Otis coined it two years later. The Second International Congress on World Evangelization was held that year. Multiple speakers gave talks on territorial spirits, bringing the concept to a wider audience. The AD2000 and Beyond network grew from these talks and focused on bringing the gospel to the whole world by the end of the century; spiritual battle was a primary focus. Also beginning in 1989 was Plan Resistencia, a project focusing on city-wide evangelism and societal transformation in Resistencia, Argentina. Holvast states that it "brought together into one system notions such as spiritual warfare, evangelism, territorial spirits, breaking and binding of spirits, identificational repentance, Spiritual Mapping, prayer marches and newly developed strategic-level spiritual warfare terms" as well as serving as a testing ground for these new concepts. The project involved social aid, grassroots prayer groups, mapping of the city's spiritual history (including the names of its historical local deities), and "blanketing" the city with prayer. The goal was "confrontation of the powers in prayer in the very strongholds from which they held sway over their territories. The strongholds were their symbols, like statues, monuments, buildings and ley lines". Silvoso was a key developer of the project. Cindy Jacobs, founder of the Generals of Intercession, held spiritual mapping seminars as part of Plan Resistencia. In the end, Plan Resistencia did not lead to greater rates of church growth than in other cities. The spiritual mapping movement then faded in Argentina, but continued to grow particularly in the United States before decreasing as a separate movement there, partially due to being incorporated into certain neo-Charismatic circles.

== Events, media coverage and spread ==
As the concept began to grow, cases of Christians spiritually mapping their communities or communities abroad were covered in the media.

Kenyan pastor Thomas Muthee undertook spiritual mapping and strategic spiritual warfare in the late 1980s. After a crusade in a Nairobi suburb which led to the founding of a church there, they drove out a local diviner known as Mama Jane, in whom they identified the "spirit of witchcraft" they believed had power over the area.

In the early 1990s, spiritual mapping began to spread, including in influential New Apostolic Reformation prophet Cindy Jacobs' Charismatic circles in the Dallas–Fort Worth area, one of the first regions where the concepts took hold before spreading more widely in Evangelicalism.

In 1994, Christianity Today mentioned spiritual mapping among a growing Christian prayer movement, also covered in other media in the lead-up to the second millennium. The process of spiritual mapping was described as follows:

This process involves researching a city's history and, through prayer, waiting for spiritually intuitive impressions or visions that 'reveal' a city's spiritual condition. So in Cali, Colombia, for example, one of the discerned spirits might be drug addiction; in Portland, Oregon, individualism; and in Jeremie, Haiti, it might be voodoo. These broad characterizations are seen as parallels to biblical characterizations of cities such as Sodom and Gomorrah that had reputations for immorality.

George Otis, coiner of the term spiritual mapping, had visited dozens of countries by the early 1990s in an effort to gather on-the-ground information about evil activity around the world in the spiritual realm. In a 1993 article on Otis, the Calgary Herald described his research: "Why is it that, historically, some regions of the world are more prone to evil activity?...For instance...Why is Haiti the eyesore of the western hemisphere? Why has Mesopotamia produced a succession of tyrannical rulers? Why is there such a high incidence of demonic worship and manifestation in the Himalayas?" He collected maps, photos, and over 40,000 pages of interviews to plot out areas prone to demonic activity. Also mentioned in the article on Otis was a group of Christians in Calgary, Alberta, Canada, who spiritually mapped their city for evangelistic purposes.

In 1997, the International Consultation on Spiritual Mapping conference was first held, with 450 people from 31 countries attending.

Ted Haggard's New Life Church, who worked closely with Wagner, engaged in then-new spiritual mapping, spiritual warfare, prayer walking, and anointing in villages in Mali as well as their hometown of Colorado Springs, Colorado. Dutch missionary René Holvast and American radio journalist Alix Spiegel, observing this in Mali and Colorado, respectively, found themselves discovering what Holvast termed a "new paradigm" in Christian missions. Holvast would later go on to write his dissertation on the topic and Spiegel covered it in a radio episode. The church opened its World Prayer Center in 1998, which included an office devoted to spiritual mapping and a "spiritual 'war room'"; Haggard considered the center a "spiritual NORAD" that is, a spiritual equivalent to the North American Aerospace Defense Command. The locations were "for roughly a decade, the epicenter of an ongoing, radical redefinition of Christianity." In December 2002, the church closed its spiritual mapping repository.

In his 2008 book Spiritual Mapping the United States and Argentina, 1989–2005: A Geography of Fear, Holvast states that the movement has declined for several reasons. Its use has shifted away from mainstream evangelicalism and Pentecostalism and its tenets have been absorbed by segments of the neo-Charismatic world, such as the Apostolic–Prophetic movement. There is now less necessity for devoted spiritual mapping organizations; the novelty of spiritual mapping has also decreased. Additionally, some practitioners believe the public focus on spiritual warfare and the demonic in order to evangelize is seen as off-putting by non-Christians.

== Tools ==
Geographic information system (GIS) software and GPS are used in the movement to compile, analyze, query, and visualize geographic data.

== Influence ==
Overlapping with NAR prophet Cindy Jacobs' circles was a local school superintendent who promoted school prayer, to combat societal ills, at the same religious conferences. Scholar Benjamin Young has described the spiritual mapping movement as "[tilling] fertile soil for [See You at the Pole]", a Christian prayer event in which students gather at their school flagpoles to pray.

== See also ==
- Classification of demons
- Demonology
- Exorcism
- Prayer warrior
- Spirit world (Spiritualism)
- Dutch Sheets
- Rick Joyner
