= New Apostolic Reformation =

Movement which seeks to establish Christian dominionism

- Type: Independent Network Charismatic
- Classification: Protestant
- Orientation: Charismatic
- Polity: Congregationalism
- Origin: c. 1975
- Branched from: Association of Vineyard Churches
- Congregations: Ambassador Auditorium; Bethel Church; El Rey Jesús; Heritage International Ministries; International House of Prayer

The New Apostolic Reformation (NAR) or Neo-Apostolicism is a Christian supremacist theological belief and movement that combines elements of Pentecostalism, evangelicalism, the Latter Rain movement and the Dominion theology to advocate for spiritual warfare to bring about Christian dominion over all aspects of society and end or weaken the separation of church and state. NAR leaders often call themselves apostles and prophets. The movement is heavily associated with C. Peter Wagner, who coined the term and founded the movement's characteristic networks. Wagner himself described the NAR as "the most radical change in the way of doing church since the Protestant Reformation."

Long a fringe movement of the American Christian right, it has been characterized as "one of the most important shifts in Christianity in modern times". With the 2008 publication of Wagner's Dominion! How Kingdom Action Can Change the World, the movement began a greater focus on gaining political influence—through spiritual warfare—in order to effect societal change. The NAR's prominence and power have increased since the 2016 election of Donald Trump as US president. Theology professor André Gagné, author of a 2024 book on the movement, has characterized it as "inherently political" and said it threatens to "subvert democracy". Religion scholar Julie Ingersoll has stated the movement is "often...now the public face of Christian Nationalism." Leading NAR figures were instrumental in promoting the 2020 election-fraud narrative and sustaining interest in Trump until the 2024 election. NAR Christians have gained a prominent position in the second Trump administration through the Faith Office, headed by Paula White-Cain.

The Southern Poverty Law Center characterizes NAR as "the greatest threat to American democracy that most people have never heard of". Some groups within the broader Apostolic-Prophetic movement have distanced themselves from the NAR due to various criticisms and controversies.

== History and reach ==
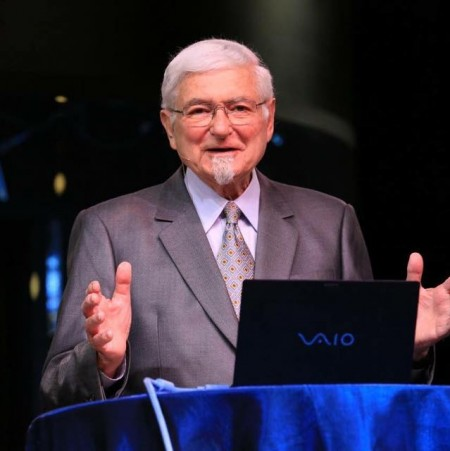
C. Peter Wagner, coiner of the term New Apostolic Reformation

American missiologist, theologian, and "church growth guru" C. Peter Wagner is often said to be the coiner of the term New Apostolic Reformation and is often described as the movement's founder; however, he saw himself as applying a name to an already existing phenomenon, not as the movement's founder.

The name New Apostolic Reformation and whether it constitutes a distinct movement is the subject of some controversy. Some scholars also use the terms Independent Network Charismatic (INC) or Apostolic-Prophetic Movement to refer to the NAR. Sociologists Brad Christerson and Richard Flory argue that the NAR is part of the INC, but there is enough difference that not all INC groups fall under the NAR. Religion scholar Matthew D. Taylor uses NAR to refer to only those specifically connected to Wagner's networks, calling those that are part of the broader movement Independent Charismatics.

Elizabeth A. McAlister notes that the names Spiritual Mapping movement, Transformation or Revival movement, and Third Wave Evangelical movement are also used. The term NAR has been described as "relatively well established in the academic community". Some groups within the broader Apostolic-Prophetic movement have distanced themselves from the NAR due to various criticism and controversies such as January 6 Capitol attack and election denialism.

Primarily "influenced and driven by North American evangelicals," the NAR is rooted in the Pentecostal and Charismatic Christianity movements: namely, the first-wave Pentecostalism of the 1900s, the Latter Rain movement of the 1940s, the second-wave Charismatic Christianity of the 1960s through 1980s, and the Shepherding movement of the 1970s and 1980s. The NAR has been described as taking the restorationism, dominionism, and "end-times revival" focus of the Latter Rain movement—thought to lead to a new Christian influence on the world—and the authoritarian nature of the Shepherding movement, described as "a kind of pyramid of power and accountability whereby authority (usually male) would flow down from a leading national (or global) figure to local pastors, and even through a chain of pastoral command between congregants".

Described as a "born networker", Wagner was involved in a number of missions and church growth organizations and a charter member of the Evangelical Lausanne movement focused on evangelism. Starting in the early 1980s, he was a professor in Church Growth at Fuller Theological Seminary in Pasadena, California, where his influence grew. A "key disciple" of Vineyard Church founder John Wimber, who focused on exercising spiritual gifts such as prophecy and miracles, Wagner initially emphasized spiritual gifts as well, holding "Signs, Wonders and Church Growth" courses at Fuller Seminary along with Wimber. Wagner described three stages in what he later called the New Apostolic Reformation: the early 1900s African Independent Church movement, the 1970s Chinese house church movement, and finally the growth of independent Charismatic churches in the 1970s and 1980s—including in Latin America and Africa, and combining elements of indigenous cosmologies. Wagner termed the neo-charismatic movement the "Third Wave".

As the movement developed and Wagner's views were changed through his connection with Wimber, Wagner's focus shifted to spiritual warfare and exorcism. The neo-charismatic movement—as opposed to traditional Pentecostal belief, which focused on individual demonic oppression—developed a theology of regions controlled by specific demons, termed territorial spirits. Wagner helped popularize the concept. Though spiritual warfare had not been of significant importance in evangelical theology, his Spiritual Warfare Network of the 1980s and 1990s profoundly and quickly impacted broader evangelical belief on the matter.

In 1991, Wagner founded Global Harvest Ministries (now Global Spheres), which founded several NAR apostolic networks.

In 1996, Wagner organized a convention with 500 evangelical leaders, the National Symposium on the Postdenominational Church, including the organization of the church and evangelism, in Pasadena. It addressed the changing organizational forms Wagner saw in churches, which he considered a radical paradigm shift. Other, more traditionally denominational Pentecostals such as Wagner's Foursquare friend Jack Hayford disagreed with the term postdenominational. Shortly before the symposium, the term New Apostolic Reformation was adopted to refer to the new movement instead. Wagner himself has traditionally been known as the coiner of the term, though symposium organizer Kay Hiramine states Wagner did not invent it. Over time, the term New Apostolic Reformation gained prominence over the previous Third Wave.

In 1996, Wagner published Confronting the Powers: How the New Testament Church Experienced the Power of Strategic-Level Spiritual Warfare and Engaging the Enemy, in which he discussed spiritual warfare on multiple levels. Starting in the late 1990s and through the mid-2000s, the NAR began to absorb the spiritual mapping movement, which had started in 1989 at the Evangelical Second International Congress on World Evangelization and focused on on-site prayer campaigns to battle demons in specific areas. Wagner's movement quickly took on an increasingly apostolic–prophetic tone and his organizational acumen helped it expand through networks of apostles and prophets and their organizations, while their ideas, such as dominionism, also spread back into the movement. After his retirement in 2010 and death in 2016, these organizations have been led by apostles and prophets.

Regarding dominionism, in 2007 Wagner said:

Our theological bedrock is what has been known as Dominion Theology. This means that our divine mandate is to do whatever is necessary, by the power of the Holy Spirit, to retake the dominion of God's creation which Adam forfeited to Satan in the Garden of Eden. It is nothing less than seeing God's kingdom coming and His will being done here on earth as it is in heaven.

Wagner's 2008 book Dominion! How Kingdom Action Can Change the World, with its language of spiritual violence, set the NAR on a trajectory away from simple reformation of the church's organizational structure toward gaining political influence through spiritual warfare in order to transform society. In 2008, the candidacy of US vice presidential candidate Sarah Palin helped cement partisan engagement among the NAR, as she had for decades been part of Independent Charismatic and NAR circles and was part of an NAR spiritual warfare organization.

Wagner and other NAR leaders saw in Palin "someone who evidently shared their aggressive theology" and hoped she could help bring about their concept of societal transformation as expressed through Seven Mountain Mandate theology. Similarly, shortly before his death in 2016, Wagner endorsed Donald Trump's candidacy for US president. His endorsement has been called "one of the most consequential" evangelical endorsements of Trump that year.

As the fastest growing group "within or on the periphery of American Christianity" since the 1980s, the NAR has rapidly gained religious and political influence in the United States. In 2015, it was estimated that churches openly part of the NAR were attended by 3 million Americans. Some estimates in 2020 claimed an "[influence on] approximately thirty-three million adherents in the United States", though this number is disputed.

The movement is global, growing in Latin America, Africa, and Asia, constituting a significant part of church growth in the southern hemisphere. American missionaries introduced New Apostolic thought and spiritual warfare practices to Haitian pastors and seminarians during Jean-Bertrand Aristide's first presidency and again after the 2010 Haiti earthquake through transnational missionary networks. Tenets typical of the NAR have spread into the broader Pentecostal and Charismatic worlds. NAR beliefs have a global reach through Christian media, particularly GOD TV. Trinity Broadcasting Network, an international Christian television network, "regularly promotes the teachings of the NAR" in its programming, as does Daystar Television Network. The Elijah List, a prophecy-focused website founded in 1997, is influential in the NAR.

== Beliefs ==
The New Apostolic Reformation is a theological movement rather than an organization, lacking formal membership; however, some affiliated organizations have membership systems and overlapping leadership. Religion scholar Geir Otto Holmås has stated that the "NAR is not a denomination or an organization with membership lists and an unambiguous doctrinal foundation, but a loose movement which primarily operates through informal or semi-formal channels", adding that the movement is spread in bits and pieces: religion scholar Matthew D. Taylor terms this "prophetic memes".

Holmås writes, "this explains the slightly odd fact that people who are associated with the NAR do not necessarily identify with the movement. Some of them will not even have heard the term 'New Apostolic Reformation'".

Holmås summarizes the NAR as follows:

- "The Kingdom of God is advanced on earth through the church gaining dominion"
- "Apostles, aided by prophets, constitute the church's strategic spiritual leadership"
- "The Kingdom of God will come through spiritual transformation of culture and society"
- "The end-times church will be the complete manifestation of Jesus on earth"
- "A strong focus on prophetic insight and supernatural manifestations"
- "New revelation and casual use of the Bible"

Those in the movement that inspired the title NAR have a wide range of beliefs. Those within the movement hold to their denominational interpretations of the ongoing ministry of the Holy Spirit within each believer. Unlike some parts of Protestant Christianity, these include the direct revelation of the Christ to each believer, prophecy, and the performance of miracles such as healing.

Although the movement regards the church as the true body of saved believers, as does most of evangelical Protestantism, it differs from the broader Protestant tradition in its views on the nature of church leadership—specifically the doctrine of five-fold ministry, which is based upon a non-traditional interpretation of Ephesians 4:11, the apostles and prophets, evangelists, pastors (also referred to as the shepherds), and teachers. Wagner considered 2000–2001 the beginning of the second apostolic age and believed the lost offices of prophets and apostles were restored around that time. The concept of the revived offices of apostle and prophet, however, is not unique to the NAR.

The eschatology of broader Pentecostalism is typically premillennialist, holding that biblical end-times prophecies have not yet been fulfilled and that the world will go through "a period of decay, tribulation and persecution under the reign of the Antichrist", leading to Jesus's return to earth to reign for one thousand years. In contrast, the NAR is postmillennialist, holding that most such prophecies were fulfilled during the early Church, with prophecies from the movement's prophets gaining importance in understanding the end times. It believes that the end times will be an "optimistic" period of the Kingdom of God being established on earth through the actions of obedient Christians, leading to the Second Coming.

Matthew D. Taylor describes the NAR's leadership in contrast with other forms of local church governance, in which churches are run by either an episcopal hierarchy, authoritarian pastor, or democratic system such as a church board. Instead, the movement's shared authority among the apostles and prophets is what he terms a "spiritual oligarchy". This leadership sees itself as having the divine authority and spiritual power—used in spiritual warfare—to "advance God's earthly kingdom so that Christ can return."

Made up of networks of apostles and prophets and networks of churches, Wagner saw the movement as "the most radical change in the way of doing church since the Protestant Reformation." These "relational networks", as opposed to a church bureaucratic system, were part of the previous Latter Rain movement. Biola University theology professor R. Douglas Geivett and writer Holly Pivec, who have written three books on the movement, described the movement's promises in God's Super-Apostles: Encountering the Worldwide Prophets and Apostles Movement:

If you submit to their leadership, then you too will work mighty miracles. You'll become part of a great end-time army that will bring about a world revival and cleanse the earth of evil by calling down hailstones, fire and the other judgments of God described in the New Testament Book of Revelation.

Those in opposition, seen to include much of the US federal government and the Democratic Party, are viewed as subject to demonic forces.

The dominionist Seven Mountain Mandate (7M), argued to hold "revelation status" in the NAR, is another aspect of NAR belief, stating that Christians should take over multiple aspects ("mountains") of society: family, religion, education, media, arts and entertainment, business, and government. Apostle Lance Wallnau has been one of the concept's foremost promoters, and has promoted 7M combined with spiritual warfare against perceived demonic spirits. Wallnau told followers in 2011:

If you're talking to a secular audience you don't talk about having dominion over them. This whole idea of taking over and that language of takeover, it doesn't actually help. It's good for preaching to the choir and it's shorthand if we interpret it right, but it's very bad for media."

Theology professor André Gagné asserts the Seven Mountain Mandate is more of a strategic marketing tool to mobilize NAR adherents than a theology.

Sociologists Christerson and Flory outline three steps in spiritual warfare: research, prophecy, and intercession. Wagner defined three kinds of strategic spiritual warfare to defeat territorial spirits controlling people or areas: prayer walking in groups through demon-controlled areas, large prayer marches to an area where a rally is held, and strategic-level spiritual warfare, prayer journeys in which spiritual warriors travel to "powerful 'spiritual strongholds'" to confront demons. The first two forms have also been defined as "ground-level" and "occult-level", in which demons are exorcised from individuals, and perceived demonic concepts such as the New Age, Freemasonry, and Buddhism are targeted, respectively. Those in the movement, including Wagner, have undertaken journeys to spiritual stronghold areas, such as climbing Mount Everest in 1997 ("Operation Ice Castle") to pray against the "Queen of Heaven" or "Mother of the Universe", believed to be the demon underlying Catholicism's concept of Mary, mother of Jesus.

Strategic spiritual warfare often aims at opening the 10/40 window (and 40/70 window), world regions defined in Christian missiology as having low socioeconomic status and little access to the gospel. NAR believers claim there is demonic control of a number of other areas. These include Utah (due to its high population of Church of Jesus Christ of Latter-day Saints members), Detroit, Michigan (due to the city's large Muslim population), the traditional Catholic pilgrimage location of Santiago de Compostela, Spain, as well as sites such as abortion clinics and Masonic temples.

In US politics, televangelist Paula White, chair of the evangelical advisory board in the Trump administration, called for "every demonic network that is aligned itself against the purpose, against the calling of President Trump, let it be broken, let it be torn down in the name of Jesus." Gagné, author of the 2024 book American Evangelicals for Trump: Dominion, Spiritual Warfare, and the End Times, asserts White's high-profile platform contributed to the "mainstreaming of spiritual warfare" against "demonic forces in the world that have sometimes taken over their political enemies." NAR prophet Lance Wallnau has called Trump's presidency a "spiritual warfare presidency". Media Matters reported in January 2024 that former Trump strategic advisor Steve Bannon often spoke of a "spiritual war" that characterized Democrats as "demons."

An Appeal to Heaven flag, used and popularized by some NAR adherents

Many NAR adherents have adopted the Appeal to Heaven Flag from the American Revolutionary War that symbolized seeking authority from a power higher than the British king. André Gagné asserts the NAR symbolism of the flag "has completely turned" from the original meaning to now "support the idea that Trump should be president, that he's chosen by God." The flag is displayed outside Speaker Mike Johnson's Capitol Hill office and has flown at the New Jersey vacation home of United States Supreme Court justice Samuel Alito.

Dutch Sheets has long advocated the end of separation of church and state, co-authoring a 2022 "Watchman Decree" that states "we, the Church, are God's governing Body on the earth." During a 2022 live-streamed service, Sheets prayed over congresswoman Marjorie Taylor Greene, who identifies as a Christian nationalist, concluding, "You are highly favored, you will not fail, in Jesus' name, Amen!" House Speaker Mike Johnson said in November 2023 that the "separation of church and state is a misnomer" because the Founders "did not want the government to encroach upon the church—not that they didn't want principles of faith to have influence on our public life. It's exactly the opposite." Speaking at a religious service in summer 2022, congresswoman Lauren Boebert said:

The church is supposed to direct the government. The government is not supposed to direct the church. That is not how our Founding Fathers intended it. I'm tired of this separation of church and state junk that's not in the Constitution. It was in a stinking letter, and it means nothing like what they say it does.

=== Bible translation ===
Brian Simmons is a NAR apostle and the author of The Passion Translation, which he asserts Jesus personally commissioned him to translate from the New Testament and the Hebrew Bible into new scripture in 2009. He added that he had been transported to meet Jesus in an immense library in Heaven. The translation has been endorsed by several NAR leaders such as Bill Johnson, Lou Engle, Chuck Pierce, and Ché Ahn. Holly Pivec, who has co-authored three books on the NAR, writes that many in the movement use it as their primary Bible.

Pivec adds that Simmons is the sole author of the translation, and he has not disclosed the editors and scholars he says have reviewed his work. Pivec and her co-author, Geivett, assert the translation contains "completely reworded verses, making it appear that the Bible supports NAR teachings." Bible scholars say the Simmons book does not meet the rigorous standards of a translation but rather functions as a paraphrase. BibleGateway, an evangelical Christian website providing access to 232 versions of the Christian Bible in 74 languages, removed The Passion Translation from its site in February 2022.

== Associated people ==
Few, if any, organizations publicly espouse connection to the NAR, though there are numerous public individuals associated with it, including:

- Ché Ahn, Harvest International Ministries; an asserted NAR apostle
- Mike Bickle, founder of International House of Prayer and member of the Apostolic Council of Prophetic Elders, though he has stated he is not affiliated with Wagner or a dominionist
- Lauren Boebert, Republican congresswoman
- Vance Boelter, perpetrator of the 2025 shootings of Minnesota legislators
- Lou Engle, founder of TheCall
- Michael Flynn, Republican former Trump national security advisor, whose ReAwaken America Tour is sponsored by NAR proponent Charisma News and features NAR themes
- Jim Garlow, former senior pastor of Skyline Church
- Faytene Grasseschi, Canadian conservative activist and broadcaster
- James Goll, prophet and member of the Apostolic Council of Prophetic Elders
- Marjorie Taylor Greene, Republican congresswoman
- Rebecca Greenwood, member of Wagner's Global Harvest Ministries and spiritual warfare guide author
- Cindy Jacobs, cofounder of Generals International, member of the Apostolic Council of Prophetic Elders, and influence on Wagner
- Bill Johnson, senior leader of Bethel Church, has been called part of the movement; he states, however, that the church has no official connection
- Mike Johnson, Republican Speaker of the US House of Representatives
- Rick Joyner, founder of MorningStar Ministries
- John P. Kelly, founder and Convening Apostle of the International Coalition of Apostolic Leaders and founder of John P. Kelly Ministries
- Mike Lindell, pillow entrepreneur
- Guillermo Maldonado, co-founder and senior pastor of El Rey Jesús and apostle in the International Coalition of Apostolic Leaders
- Doug Mastriano, 2022 Republican nominee for governor of Pennsylvania
- Ana Méndez Ferrell, "general of spiritual warfare" under Wagner and leader of spiritual mapping operations
- Thomas Muthee, Kenyan preacher
- Tom Parker, Republican chief justice of the Alabama Supreme Court
- Alice Patterson, leader of Justice at the Gate, who has characterized the Democratic Party as a demon structure
- Chuck Pierce, member of the Apostolic Council of Prophetic Elders
- Dutch Sheets, founder of Dutch Sheets Ministries, asserted apostle, and member of the Apostolic Council of Prophetic Elders
- Ed Silvoso, founder of Harvest Evangelism and member of Eagles Vision Apostolic Team
- Brian Simmons, founder of Stairway Ministries and Passion and Fire Ministries, author of The Passion Translation
- Roger Stone, Republican political advisor
- Jan-Aage Torp, head of European Apostolic Leaders, an organization founded by Wagner
- C. Peter Wagner, founder of Global Harvest Ministries, who is associated with the term New Apostolic Reformation
- Lance Wallnau, an asserted apostle
- Paula White, an apostle and Senior Advisor to the White House Faith Office for Donald Trump
- Todd White, Lifestyle Christianity

After being named as part of the NAR, and critics believing that Bethel Church was instrumental in leading some Christians to embrace tenets of NAR, Pastor Bill Johnson of Bethel became regularly listed as an NAR leader. Johnson confirmed that he does believe in the apostolic and prophetic ministries, but denied in an official statement that his church had any official ties to the NAR. Johnson and NAR apostle Lance Wallnau co-wrote the 2013 book Invading Babylon: The 7 Mountain Mandate.

When Rick Joyner of MorningStar Ministries was listed, he announced that "there will likewise be a horde of false apostles released", continuing: "Our team received two very specific dreams warning about false 'apostolic movements' that were built more on organization than relationship. The dreams indicated that these were trying to bring forth apostles that were really more like corporate CEOs, and the movement that they led had the potential to do great damage to the church. The enemy's intent with this false apostolic movement was to have the church develop a deep revulsion to anything that was called apostolic."

== Associated networks, organizations and events ==
Though the NAR movement is loosely constituted of networks of congregations, apostles, and prophets, there are a number of NAR apostle and prophet-related organizations – started by Wagner and later taken over by others – with varying degrees of overlap.

- Apostolic Council for Educational Accountability (ACEA)
- Apostolic Council of Prophetic Elders (ACPE), an organization founded by Wagner and Cindy Jacobs, for the most prominent American prophets
- Eagles' Vision Apostolic Team (EVAT), named the "most important" of Wagner's organizations, the group consists of 25 of his closest disciples and "spiritual children"
- European Apostolic Leaders (EAL)
- Global Harvest Ministries
- Heartland Apostolic Network (HAN)
- International Association of Healing Ministries (IAHR)
- International Coalition of Apostolic Leaders (ICA), a network of apostles; it was founded in 1999 by apostle John P. Kelly and has 2000 members in over 85 countries
- International Society of Deliverance Ministries (ISDM)
- One Voice Prayer Movement
- Strategic Prayer Network
- Wagner Leadership Institute (WLI), a seminary for apostles, with dozens of campuses worldwide

In 2021, NAR leaders played a key part in heading the newly founded Michael Flynn ReAwaken America Tour, which was initially a protest against COVID-19 restrictions. The events have become what has been described as "a rolling Chautauqua-style celebration of the spiritual side of Trumpism."

NPR likewise characterizes it as "part conservative Christian revival, part QAnon expo and part political rally." Anthea Butler, chair of the University of Pennsylvania religious studies department, asserts the prophecies and charismatic preaching at ReAwaken events can be traced to NAR. Themes of spiritual warfare and accompanying territorial spirits are prominent. "Darkly messianic religious speakers" speak at the events, with one warning, "Do not be surprised if the Angel of Death shows up in Washington", and others referring to "demonic territory that's over the land".

Flynn, a former Army lieutenant general and Trump national security advisor, said at a 2021 event, "If we are going to have one nation under God, which we must, we have to have one religion. One nation under God and one religion under God, right?" At one event, Trump confidant Roger Stone asserted there was a visible "satanic portal" over the Biden White House that must be closed by prayer. At another event, self-declared prophet Julie Green claimed God had told her that "These are the days for you to control the governments of this earth. God said he can take this country back in unconventional ways. He doesn't need an election to do it."

In September 2024, JD Vance, the Republican nominee for vice president in the 2024 United States presidential election, spoke at a western Pennsylvania town hall event organized by top Christian nationalist leaders who promote election denialism. The organizers characterized Democratic presidential nominee Kamala Harris as a "demon." The event was hosted by Wallnau, who had previously said Harris represented the "spirit of Jezebel" and used "witchcraft" during her debate with Trump weeks earlier. Campaigning for Trump in October 2024, Elon Musk held a town hall meeting at a Harrisburg, Pennsylvania megachurch that in recent years had hosted an array of Christian nationalist leaders, many with ties to NAR.

== NAR-associated media ==
GOD TV, an NAR-associated network, was founded in the mid-1990s and broadcasts in over 200 countries. It broadcast the 2008 Lakeland Revival nightly and aired evangelist and faith healer Todd Bentley's apostolic alignment ceremony by Wagner and NAR apostles. (André Gagné defines apostolic alignment as "an appeal for other responsible Christians to recognize the authority of the apostle and place themselves under his 'cover' – a term implying protection and accountability.")

In 2022, the Victory Channel, owned by prosperity gospel televangelist Kenneth Copeland, launched the program FlashPoint, hosted by Gene Bailey, a pastor at Copeland's Texas church. The NAR-aligned program has the appearance of a cable news show, though reporting is delivered by prophets. The program reaches approximately 11,000 households through cable television. Bailey's website asserts the show's programming is delivered "under the anointing," meaning that its hosts and guests speak for God.

Pentecostal preachers constitute its primary guests, notably Lance Wallnau and Omaha pastor Hank Kunneman. Donald Trump has appeared on the program six times; other guests have included Michael Flynn, Charlie Kirk, Jeanine Pirro, Steve Bannon, Glenn Beck and Chaya Raichik. FlashPoint told viewers that criminal indictments against Trump were "against the purposes of God" and represented a "battle between good versus evil." Bailey has said, "We do have an agenda, and that is I am a Christo-fascist, Christian nationalist."

Media Matters reported that at an August 2022 FlashPoint Live event, Dutch Sheets led Bailey, Wallnau and Kunneman in reciting the Watchman Decree with a live audience, declaring that "we have been given legal power and authority from Heaven" and "delegated by Him to destroy every attempted advance of the enemy." The show launched a seven-stop FlashPoint Live roadshow in support of Trump in February 2024.

Pure Flix, a Christian streaming service, is listed by the International Coalition of Apostolic Leaders' as one of their strategic partnerships.

== Coverage, controversy, and critique ==
Christian writers and organizations have commented on the movement over the past several decades. In 2001, the German Evangelical Alliance released a statement denouncing the spiritual warfare trip of C. Peter Wagner and Global Harvest Ministries to engage the "Queen of Heaven" territorial spirit in battle, stating that while they encouraged prayer, the movement's methods were "unbiblical".

In 2008, the NAR first drew national attention in the United States in the midst of Alaskan governor Sarah Palin's vice presidential campaign, when a 2005 video surfaced of her being prayed for at Wasilla Assemblies of God church by Kenyan NAR apostle Thomas Muthee. Anthea Butler notes that "by praying for favor and for the use of her to turn the nation around, Muthee, like many in Wagner's leadership, understood that she was trying to get to a mountain of power. The prayer format asking for righteousness in the state and nation means that Palin is the person who can bring it, who has been anointed by God for that task. Muthee's prayer is an interesting artifact in understanding how Palin considered her 'destiny'; that she has been set apart, called by God." Including a request for protection from witchcraft – "alien to contemporary American culture" – the event was covered in the media.

One scholar noted the video "seemed to reveal a well-kept secret: a prominent politician running for vice-president of the United States secretly fighting a hidden war against the Evil One in the here and now of American civilization." Wagner expressed concern that negative coverage of Palin's ties to the NAR may have led to the campaign's loss.

In 2011, discussion about the political influence of the NAR was again brought to a national audience. Lou Engle and Don Finto, who are considered to be leaders within the NAR, participated in a prayer event held by Engle's TheCall called "TheResponse", hosted by former Texas governor Rick Perry, on August 6, 2011, in Houston, Texas. This event is cited as a sign of the influence of NAR beliefs on Rick Perry's political viewpoints. It was covered by National Public Radio and other media outlets.

In 2011, Forrest Wilder, senior editor for the Texas Observer, described the New Apostolic Reformation as having "taken Pentecostalism, with its emphasis on ecstatic worship and the supernatural, and given it an adrenaline shot." Wilder adds that beliefs of people associated with the movement "can tend toward the bizarre" and that it has "taken biblical literalism to an extreme."

Later TheCall events in 2011, including a Detroit rally, were covered in the media. NAR "calls to 'take back the land' of Muslim Americans" by engaging in spiritual warfare prayer over mosques, described as "like sending our special forces into Afghanistan", drew concern. An apostle stated the event was "not divisive at all" and that they were "praying for God to move in Detroit ... so that we can all be one". The event's goal was to get African Americans to convert local Muslims, who would then convert others in the Middle East. Baptist, Methodist, and Catholic clergy protested the event.

In 2012, during Newt Gingrich's presidential campaign, his connections to NAR apostles were covered in the media. This included Pray & ACT events sponsored by his organization Renewing American Leadership, which featured NAR apostles Lance Wallnau and Lou Engle and which included Seven Mountains exhortations. Dutch Sheets served as co-chair of Gingrich's Faith Leaders Coalition that year.

In 2012, sociologist Margaret Poloma described the NAR's spiritual warfare rhetoric: "The way some of the leaders talk, you'd think they were an army planning to take over the world...It sounds to me like radical Islam." In 2013, Paul Rosenberg called the NAR "America's Own Taliban" in an article highlighting the NAR's dominionism as bearing resemblance to Islamic extremism as seen in groups such as the Taliban because of the NAR's language concerning a form of prayer called spiritual warfare.

As many churches and individuals in the movement do not follow the three ecumenical creeds, they are seen as having moved away from mainstream Christianity. Baptist theologian Dr. Roger E. Olson writes:

...the closer I looked at the NARM [New Apostolic Reformation movement] the less convinced I was that it is a cohesive movement at all. It seems more like a kind of umbrella term for a loose collection of independent ministries that have a few common interests... I have examined the web sites of several independent evangelists who claim to represent that affinity... So far none of them seem blatantly heretical. Eccentric, non-mainline, a bit fanatical, maybe.

In 2017, David Woodfield's thesis on the NAR noted that "Whilst being of little relevance, or even interest, to a British constituency, the linking up of well-known American political figures with leading NAR personalities and national events is of significant import in the USA, a factor which has become noticeably evident during the recent (2012 and 2016) presidential elections."

In 2020, Canadian magazine The Walrus covered the NAR, particularly the NAR's focus on and impact on indigenous communities by identifying native lands – through spiritual mapping – as spiritual warfare targets.

In 2022, Matthew D. Taylor, a scholar of Protestantism at the Institute for Islamic, Christian, and Jewish Studies, released an audio documentary on the movement's connection to the January 6 United States Capitol attack, entitled Charismatic Revival Fury. Taylor asserts that NAR is "the backbone ... of Christian Trumpism." He argues it was "seen as fringy, was seen as the realm of hucksters, seen as kind of low-brow and populist and extremist" before Trump recruited it in 2016 to rally evangelical support for his campaign. Taylor asserts NAR is difficult to track due to its intentional anti-institutional, decentralized "mesh network" of influencers on the internet.

Taylor said radicalized NAR spiritual warfare adherents believe entire cities and institutions are possessed by demonic spirits (territorial spirits) that can be defeated only by the presence of large numbers of Christians. In the weeks preceding the January 6 attack, self-proclaimed NAR apostles such as Dutch Sheets told followers they needed to be at the Capitol to ensure Trump would remain president. Sheets met with Trump administration officials at the White House days before the Capitol attack. Four of the six protest permits that day were issued to "NAR-affiliated charismatic church groups." Similarly, André Gagné states, "a lot of NAR people just embrace the Big Lie" based on messages from the movement's prophets.

In October 2022, over 60 Charismatic figures signed the NAR and Christian Nationalism Statement, denouncing Christian nationalism, racial and ethnic supremacy, the conflation of spirituality and patriotism, and other issues.

Lance Wallnau's prophetic rhetoric has been described as having "nationalist", "anti-democratic", and "fascist" traits by scholar Arne Helge Teigen. A 2022 joint report from the Baptist Joint Committee for Religious Liberty and the Freedom From Religion Foundation on the role of Christian nationalism in the Capitol attack argues that Wallnau's "warfare rhetoric" is linked to stochastic terrorism.

In February 2024, Politico reported that Russell Vought, a leader of Project 2025—a group closely aligned with Trump that created an expansive blueprint for the next Republican presidency—was spearheading plans to instill Christian nationalism into that presidency. One of the story authors, Heidi Przybyla, later said in a television interview, in part:

Remember when Trump ran in 2016, a lot of the mainline Evangelicals wanted nothing to do with the divorced real estate mogul who had cheated on his wife with a porn star and all of that, right? So what happened was he was surrounded by this more extremist element. You're going [to] hear words like 'Christian nationalism,' like the 'New Apostolic Reformation.' These are groups that you should get very, very schooled on because they have a lot of power in Trump's circle.

Vought and several others criticized Przybyla on X for her televised remarks, which she said they had misunderstood.

Dartmouth College professor Jeff Sharlet is the author of the 2023 book The Undertow: Scenes from a Slow Civil War. After years traveling to meet with Trump supporters, he writes that his initial "objections to describing militant Trumpism as fascist have fallen away." He asserts Project 2025 is influenced by NAR. Sharlet contends that the Project's first mandate to 'restore the family as the centerpiece of American life and protect our children' "is Q-coded—it's 'protect the blood,' it's the 14 words, it's all this stuff."

In March 2024, writing in The Atlantic, Stephanie McCrummen reported that Frederick Clarkson, who has studied the Christian right for decades, "considers the NAR to be one of the most important shifts in Christianity in modern times." Clarkson said "Christian nationalism is a handy term, but it is a box into which NAR does not quite fit" because the movement is "so much bigger than that." McCrummen wrote:

This [NAR] language, which can be mystifying to those not steeped in it, is commonly categorized as fundamentalism or Christian nationalism. But those terms do not adequately capture the scope and ambitions of the rapidly growing charismatic Christian movement with which [Tom Parker] has publicly associated himself—a world of megachurches, modern-day apostles and prophets, media empires, worship bands, and millions of followers that is becoming the most aggressive faction of the Christian right and the leading edge of charismatic Christianity worldwide.

Conservative Christians have critiqued the movement for its unorthodox beliefs. Holly Pivec, co-author with Biola University theology professor Douglas Geivett of Counterfeit Kingdom: The Dangers of New Revelation, New Prophets, and New Age Practices in the Church, says many Pentecostals and Charismatics are concerned that the NAR movement is inconsistent with historical Christian teachings. She asserts, "They're not just promoting the miraculous gifts, they're actually promoting the offices of apostle and prophet—these authoritative offices that all others are supposed to submit to." Pivec asserts some modern Christian churches "promote novel teachings and practices that do not have the support of Scripture" and that "NAR teachings and practices have divided families, split churches, stunted the spiritual growth of believers, and left countless Christians disillusioned by promises of healing and miraculous power that haven't panned out."

In 2023, Marvin Olasky, former longtime editor of the evangelical magazine World, said that American evangelicalism is fracturing in real time, between a faction that embraces pluralism, other faiths and democracy, and one that advocates governance by strict biblical law "by any means necessary." He added, "I have to say that compassionate conservatism is out of business these days, and in a sense, cruel conservatism is ascendant." NPR reported the "any means necessary" faction has a direct line to House Speaker Mike Johnson due to his close ties to NAR leaders such as Jim Garlow.

The movement has been compared by multiple scholars to extremist conspiracy groups. Scholar Steve Snow argues that the "NAR represents what Richard Hofstadter referred to as the modern paranoid style in American politics" characterized by the John Birch Society (JBS). The NAR – similarly to the JBS's labeling of president Dwight D. Eisenhower as a communist agent – has stated president Barack Obama is a "treasonous Muslim". Likewise, Anthea Butler says the messaging at ReAwaken America events of election denialism, vaccine conspiracy theories and anti-government sentiment has been largely embraced by the Republican Party.

Butler and Matthew D. Taylor find that the NAR movement garners little attention in the press, noting its violent rhetoric. Butler states, "All the talk you hear about demonic stuff, about violent stuff—people should take that very seriously." Snow contends that there is significant overlap between these extremist and more mainstream groups, stating that the primary difference between the conspiracy theories believed by groups such as the Christian Coalition and the Moral Majority and those of is that extremists "take the violent rhetoric more seriously".

Michael Flynn has told ReAwaken America attendees that they are engaged in a political and spiritual war. Mark Clatterbuck, associate professor of religion at Montclair State University, described an October 2022 ReAwaken event he attended as a MAGA-driven "seething groundswell of spiritually sanctioned incitement to violence that was impossible to ignore." He wrote the event was "saturated" with war imagery, as well as preachers engaged in violent religious rhetoric. Clatterbuck added that leaders aligned with NAR are "driven by a prophetic certainty that God is commanding them to establish a militant Christian theocracy in the United States."

In June 2024, the Southern Poverty Law Center characterized NAR as "the greatest threat to American democracy that most people have never heard of." Researcher Bruce Wilson asserts he has identified well-funded programs designed "to obscure, to confuse and confound reporters and journalists and academics who are writing about and discussing dominionist Christianity." André Gagné argues that NAR's "strength is that they're stealth" and that the media "has a very important role to play in speaking about this movement and how it will use the levers of democracy to eventually subvert democracy."

In 2008, one scholar, noting the prevalence of Wagner's spiritual warfare teachings in Singapore, describes the belief's potential for divisiveness in a multicultural society where the deities of neighboring non-Christians are seen as "cultural ethnic demons".

Matthew D. Taylor wrote in 2024 that the language of spiritual warfare incites real-world violence against those labeled as possessed by demons and worries that rhetoric threatens democracy since one cannot negotiate with demons in good faith. He calls it a form of "Toxic Christianity" with a propensity to dehumanize others.

== In media ==
NAR beliefs have been part of evangelical, and particularly charismatic Christian, media. By the mid-to-late 1980s, Christian author Frank Peretti's novels featuring spiritual battles, territorial spirits, and demonology – seen as spiritual reality portrayed in fictional settings – found popularity among evangelicals; Wagner considered them the best depiction of real-world spiritual warfare.

Scholar Damon T. Berry argues that the "presence of imagined enemies [threatening] to destroy Christianity and America added to Trump's appeal" to evangelicals, issues NAR prophecies were believed to address. Mark Taylor's prophecies in his 2017 book The Trump Prophecies have been described by scholar Arne Helge Teigen as being aimed at NAR followers.

The 2006 documentary Jesus Camp depicts the life of young children attending Becky Fischer's neo-charismatic summer camp; though Fischer has sometimes been identified as Pentecostal, she is most closely associated with the NAR.

In 2026, The Atlantic describes the conflict between an NAR-associated church—The Well—and a bookstore in the town of Maryville, Tennessee. The church started targeting the LGBT-owned bookstore across the street as part of "spiritual warfare against demonic forces in Maryville".

== See also ==
- Book of Revelation
- Christian fascism
- Christian reconstructionism
- Christian supremacy
- Prosperity theology
- Millenarianism
- Millennialism
- Prayer warrior
- Ziklag
