= Pasadena International House of Prayer =

Prayer center in Pasadena, California

The Pasadena International House of Prayer (PIHOP) is a prayer center based in Pasadena, California. It is modeled after the charismatic movement and is a branch of the International House of Prayer in Kansas City (IHOPKC), a mission organization founded in 1999 by Mike Bickle.

== History ==
PIHOP was founded in Pasadena in the early 2000s as a branch of the International House of Prayer in Kansas City (IHOPKC), following its model of continuous intercessory worship and prayer. Cheryl Allen, the founder of PIHOP, has served as its executive director since its early years. The ministry shares theological and organizational affinities with IHOPKC and the broader charismatic movement.

== Lawsuit ==
In September 2010, the IHOP restaurant chain (International House of Pancakes) filed a trademark infringement lawsuit against PIHOP and other ministries affiliated with IHOPKC, alleging that use of the acronym "IHOP" caused consumer confusion and violated its trademark. In December 2010, the lawsuit was dropped following an out-of-court settlement.

== Controversies ==
While PIHOP has not been directly implicated in controversies, its parent organization, IHOPKC, has faced significant public scrutiny over allegations of sexual misconduct, spiritual abuse, and organizational mismanagement. In 2023 and 2024, multiple individuals came forward with allegations of sexual misconduct and spiritual abuse involving IHOPKC founder Mike Bickle and other leaders. As of mid‑2025, PIHOP has not publicly commented on Mike Bickle’s admission of “inappropriate behavior” towards women or related systemic spiritual abuses.

== See also ==
- Mike Bickle
- International House of Prayer
- Lou Engle
- TheCall
- Justice House of Prayer
- Youth with a Mission
