= Global Harvest Ministries =

Parachurch organization

Global Harvest Ministries (GHM; now Global Spheres) is a Christian parachurch organisation, focusing on evangelism and church planting around the world. It focuses on the 40/70 window, an area in Christian missions that has been historically Christian but is now becoming post-Christian.

The organisation was founded in 1991 by C. Peter Wagner, leader of the neo-charismatic and apostolic–prophetic New Apostolic Reformation (NAR) movement. GHM founded a number of NAR networks, including the International Coalition of Apostolic Leaders (ICAL) headed by apostle John P. Kelly and the Apostolic Council of Prophetic Elders (ACPE). Additionally, it was a "major and visible facilitator and stimulator of spiritual mapping in the 1990s". It became Global Spheres in 2012, and as of 2023, is led by Chuck Pierce. As of January 1, 2023, Global Spheres became a DBA of Glory of Zion International Ministries, which is also led by Chuck Pierce.

== See also ==
- 10/40 window
- Spiritual warfare
