= Elijah List =

Prophetic Christian website

The Elijah List
- Founded: 1997
- Founder: Steve Shultz
- Headquarters: Albany, Oregon, U.S.
- Owner: Steve Shultz

The Elijah List is a non-denominational Christian prophetic website based in Oregon, US.

The website was created by Steve Shultz in 1997 and has over 250,000 subscribers as of 2021. The name of the site comes from the Old Testament prophet, Elijah. The list's mission statement says that it "is called to transmit around the world, in agreement with Holy Scripture, fresh daily prophetic 'manna' from the Lord, regarding the days in which we live." The site states that it "receives content from a large number of American 'prophets' and 'seers'." and contains links to many of their sites. The Elijah List has been referred to as "influential" among the New Apostolic Reformation movement, a Charismatic Christian movement.

Various members of the prophetic movement have credited their exposure and/or popularity to their writings on the Elijah List, including Catherine Brown, Chuck Pierce, Kim Clement (now deceased), Kathie Walters and Victoria Boyson.

The Elijah List was holding conferences as early as November 2000. In a March 2006 profile, Charisma noted that "The Elijah List has more than 127,000 subscribers and has become the largest platform for prophetic ministers."

== Controversy ==
As of 2023, a minor rift has emerged among figures associated with Elijah List and Pentecostalism more broadly, with some Pentecostals and self-proclaimed prophets accusing others of promoting false theological teachings.

== See also ==
- Prophecy
