= John P. Kelly (clergyman) =

Neo-charismatic Christian apostolic leader

In 1999, he founded the International Coalition of Apostolic Leaders, a network for 2000 apostles in over 85 countries. Wagner presided over the organization until stepping down in 2010; Kelly has been its leader (presiding apostle) since. Religion scholar André Gagné says "the aim of this strategic effort is to establish the Kingdom of God in all aspects of society, which corresponds to implementing the 'Seven Mountains' strategy worldwide."

Kelly is the founder and president of John P. Kelly Ministries; he also heads the board of directors of Lead Global 360°, a Christian entrepreneur organization.

== See also ==
- Dominion theology
- Independent Network Charismatic Christianity
