= 40/70 window =

Term used in Christian missions to refer to Europe and Russia

The 40/70 Window is a term used in Christian missions to refer to Europe and Russia. Named in analogy with the 10/40 window, it takes in countries between 40 and 70 degrees north of the equator. These are historically Christian, but for a long time have experienced an increase in secularism and nominal Christianity. According to the Association of Baptists for World Evangelism, it is the "largest region outside the Arab Muslim block where missions work progresses most slowly."

The 40/70 window is also associated with Christian spiritual warfare and spiritual mapping. Missionary, spiritual warfare proponent, and New Apostolic Reformation leader C. Peter Wagner held that a territorial spirit known as the "Queen of Heaven", which he associated with fertility goddesses and Catholic veneration of the Virgin Mary, controls the 40/70 window. His 2000 book The Queen's Domain: Advancing God's Kingdom in the 40/70 Window focuses on the topic. His Global Harvest Ministries (now Global Spheres) also emphasizes the 40/70 window. In 2001 Wagner and others from the ministry undertook a trip to engage in spiritual battle against the demon controlling the region; organizations opposed included the German Evangelical Alliance, which released a statement denouncing such methods.

== See also ==
- Postchristianity
