= Christian supremacy =

Belief in superiority of Christianity

Christian supremacy is the belief that asserts that Christians specifically have an inherent duty or right to rule society. The concept overlaps with—and can be considered a core tenet of—Christian nationalism. The New Apostolic Reformation, a dominionist political movement, is described by The Washington Post and scholar Bradley Onishi as promoting Christian supremacy through a mix of hard-right politics and supposed prophecy. Joseph Wiinikka-Lydon of the Southern Poverty Law Center and religion scholar Matthew D. Taylor point to the Seven Mountain Mandate as the plan for Christian dominance and supremacy.

== Discourse ==
Although a relatively recent phenomenon in Christian history, the notion of Christian supremacy can be traced back to late Medieval ideas of Christendom, which conceives of a hegemonic form of religious, cultural, and even political conformity across various theological forms. Christian supremacy and its adherents primarily follow dominion theology, which traces much of its roots from the Reformed Protestant influenced Christian reconstructionism. Additionally, the Southern Poverty Law Center identified Integralism as a related form of Dominionism.

Christian fundamentalism is a major undercurrent and central ideology of Christian supremacy. Additionally, postmillennialism is at the core of Christian supremacy through its emphasis and expectation that the majority of the world will be saved by evangelisation before the Second Coming of Jesus. To an extent, premillennialism has been considered an influence upon Christian supremacy given the emphases on the end times, especially within the New Apostolic Reformation; its broader relative, the Apostolic-Prophetic Movement; and Evangelicalism, in general. Christian supremacy may coexist with Christian antisemitism and Islamophobia to varying degrees, while homophobia, transphobia, and misogyny maintain a significant presence within Christian supremacist discourses, often through the belief in and promotion of conspiracy theories such as the LGBTQ grooming conspiracy theory and Cultural Marxism. Additionally, sectarianism can arise between denominations of Christianity as they vie for supremacy.

Christian supremacy often intersects with other forms of supremacy, such as White supremacy, and as a result, various White Christian supremacist groups exist, such as the Ku Klux Klan and Christian Identity. Scholars such as Jenny L. Small and others have highlighted the fact that Christian supremacy is related to Christian privilege and Christian hegemony, which is characterized as a system of interlocking discourses that privileges Christians and marginalizes non-Christians, thus assuming the universalization of Christian values. Christian hegemony and privileges are deeply embedded in Western societies, which sustain Christian supremacy. Even when religious plurality is formally acknowledged, the entrenchment of Christian values serves to obscure and sustain Christian privilege.

== History ==
Academics Carol Lansing and Edward D. English argue that Christian supremacism was a motivation for the Crusades in the Holy Land, as well as a motivation for crusades against Muslims and pagans throughout Europe. The blood libel is a widespread European conspiracy theory which led to centuries of pogroms, expulsions and massacres of European Jewish minorities because it alleged that Jews required the pure blood of a Christian child in order to make matzah for Passover. Thomas of Cantimpré wrote the following about the blood curse which the Jews put upon themselves and all of their generations at the court of Pontius Pilate where Jesus was sentenced to death: "A very learned Jew, who in our day has been converted to the (Christian) faith, informs us that one enjoying the reputation of a prophet among them, toward the close of his life, made the following prediction: 'Be assured that relief from this secret ailment, to which you are exposed, can only be obtained through Christian blood ("solo sanguine Christiano")." The Atlantic slave trade has also been partially attributed to Christian supremacism. The Ku Klux Klan has been described as a white supremacist Christian organization, along with many other white supremacist groups, such as the Posse Comitatus and organizations which espouse Christian Identity and Positive Christianity.

Additionally, particularly in Western contexts, Islamophobia is becoming more often seen as a structural element of Christian supremacist ideology. According to Junaid Rana, Islamophobia is a racial project with roots in colonial Christian frameworks that cast Muslims as the "Other" in a hierarchy of civilizations worldwide, rather than only a reaction to security concerns or religious disagreements. In this context, Christian supremacy can function as both a religious and cultural identity marker, shaping notions of national belonging and societal norms.

== In the United States ==
Christian supremacy was used as one justification for stealing lands from Native Americans and enslaving Africans around the founding of the United States. The philosophy that gave Americans entitlement to the land inhabited by natives is known as Manifest Destiny.

In the 1930s, the antisemitic Catholic Father Coughlin believed in and hoped to promote Christian supremacy by recruiting a militia that he called the Christian Front.

Erik Prince of the mercenary company Blackwater was accused of being a Christian supremacist and deploying Christian supremacists to Iraq, who he hoped would murder Iraqis. The company used large amounts of imagery from the Crusades.

The growing role of Christian supremacy in the U.S. Republican Party since Donald Trump's election in 2016 has drawn concern from leaders of other faiths. Al Sharpton and Doug Pagitt both called for Christians to reject Christian supremacy ideas promoted by Trump in 2020.

The January 6 United States Capitol attack after from false accusations of electoral fraud was partially motivated by Christian nationalism, which was undergirded by notions of Christian supremacy, with many rioters flying the Pine Tree Flag and extensive use of Christian imagery albeit with heavy use of militarized themes.

In 2021, NBC published an article outlining how some Asian American Christians felt discrimination within their churches, citing professors Lucas Kwong and K. Christine Pae on the connections between white supremacy and Christian supremacy. Kristin Kobes Du Mez described Mike Johnson as believing in Christian supremacy.

Dutch Sheets has promoted the belief of Christian supremacy. Ziklag was described by Matthew D. Taylor as a Christian supremacist organization working to ensure the election of Trump in 2024.

== See also ==
- Black supremacy
- Autistic supremacism
- Female superiority
- Jewish supremacy
