= Independent Network Charismatic Christianity =

Movement within evangelical charismatic Christianity

Independent Network Charismatic (INC) Christianity is a movement within evangelical charismatic Christianity which is focused on the authority of charismatic apostles and seeks the wholesale transformation of society. The term was first used in 2017 by sociologists Brad Christerson and Richard Flory in their book The Rise of Network Christianity: How Independent Leaders are Changing the Religious Landscape to describe the rapid growth of a form of Protestant Christianity from 1970 to 2010, and has since been adopted by other commentators. The movement is distinguished from other forms of Christianity by its use of network governance, based on networks of charismatic apostles, rather than more traditional church structures and hierarchies. These networks are sustained by the use of new communications technologies such as social media, which both facilitates communication between leaders in the network and enables leaders to build a following which is not tied to a geographical area. It is characterised by belief in and encouragement of the use of the supernatural gifts of the Holy Spirit, along with a focus on the transformation of society according to Christian values through prayer and by Christians reaching positions of leadership in the areas of business, government, media, arts and entertainment, education, family, and religion. INC Christianity tends to be politically conservative and, in the US, associated with support for Republican politicians.

The movement has its roots in the 1960s and 1970s Calvary Chapel and Vineyard movements, with INC Christianity emerging as leaders in these movements sought to break free from organisational structures and formed informal affinity networks. According to Christerson and Flory, INC is the fastest growing Christian group in the US. As a movement, it has been particularly appealing to younger people, especially millennials.

== Distinguishing features ==
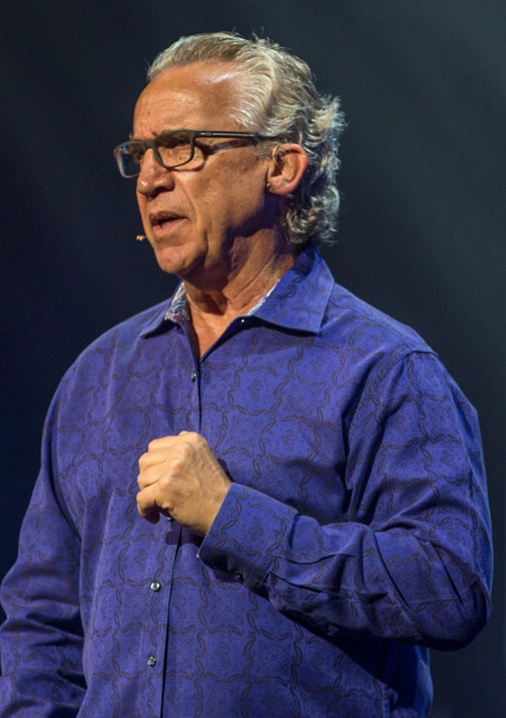
Bill Johnson, senior leader of Bethel Church; both Johnson and the church have been described by various commentators as part of INC Christianity.

Independent Network Christianity is not a denomination but rather a network of independent church and parachurch leaders. Whereas more traditional church movements (which, in this case, includes neo-Charismatic movements established in the 1970s such as Vineyard, Calvary Chapel, and Hope Chapel) have sought to build congregations and create franchises of affiliated churches, INC leaders prefer to try to directly influence the beliefs and practices of individuals, regardless of their personal and denominational affiliations. Individual salvation is regarded as more important than building church congregations; without any formal denomination or movement, individual leaders are connected by informal yet powerful co-operative networks. INC can thus be described as operating a kind of network governance.

Leaders in the INC network are referred to by insiders as apostles. Apostles tend to be charismatic in the Weberian sense of being seen to possess a supernatural authority which authenticates their ministry. An international network of apostles is facilitated by modern communication technologies such as the internet, allowing the sharing of ideas and pursuit of joint projects without the limitations of operating within a hierarchical structure. These modern technologies allow INC leaders to build international ministries and followings, using the internet and social media to create interconnected online venues which do not depend of geographical ties. Followers engage primarily with leaders through these online forums, sometimes travelling to attend conferences.

In their book, Christerson & Flory cite Ché Ahn and his Harvest International Ministries, Bill Johnson and Bethel Church, and Mike Bickle and the International House of Prayer as examples of INC leaders and organisations. Richard Ostling has also named Cindy Jacobs and Chuck Pierce as INC leaders. While some scholars use the term "Independent Network Charismatic" to refer to the New Apostolic Reformation (NAR), Christerson and Flory argue that the NAR is part of INC, but that not all INC groups fall under the NAR. Religion scholar Matthew D. Taylor uses NAR to refer to only those specifically connected to C. Peter Wagner's networks, calling others part of the broader movement Independent Charismatics.

=== Beliefs ===
Existing within charismatic Christianity, INC leaders and organisations believe in the continued operation of the supernatural spiritual gifts of the Holy Spirit, such as supernatural healing, miracles, prophecy and speaking in tongues. Supernatural activity is not limited to charismatic leaders; schools such as Bethel School of Supernatural Ministry teach their students to practice supernatural gifts themselves and use them in the community. Christerson and Flory argue that the promise of direct experience of the supernatural is attractive to young people and a key draw for them becoming involved in INC organisations. Dyron B. Daughrity, a professor of religion and philosophy at Pepperdine University, has noted that the charismatic beliefs and practices of International House of Prayer, an INC church, combined with the online accessibility of its content, has made it particularly appealing to millennials.

As well as belief in the supernatural gits of the Holy Spirit, a defining characteristic of INC Christianity is belief in social transformation. In contrast with classic pentecostalism, which tends to hold out little hope for social justice in this world and thus focuses its efforts on evangelism and discipleship, many INC groups believe that heaven can be made on earth through the action of Christians. This commitment to social change involves the desire to see INC Christians in positions of leadership in the "seven mountains of culture": business, government, media, arts and entertainment, education, family, and religion. The intention is to create a "trickle-down effect", whereby the values of Christians who reach the top of these mountains will ultimately influence the whole of American and global society. INC Christianity tends to be politically conservative and, in the United States, supportive of the Republican Party, with INC leaders regularly endorsing Republican candidates. In 2016, Mike Bickle endorsed Ted Cruz's bid for the Republican presidential nomination and Lance Wallnau, another INC leader, supported Donald Trump's presidential bid. Philosopher James K. A. Smith has suggested that the religious mindset offered by INC Christianity — that of deference to powerful and charismatic leaders — could partly explain the growth of populism which led to the 2016 election of Donald Trump. Journalist Richard Ostling has suggested that INC support of Trump, some of which regards him as an outsider anointed by God, in the mould of King Cyrus, deserves greater press scrutiny. Historian Matthew Rowley states that the movement's leaders "directly influenced President Trump".

== History ==
Christerson and Flory identify the roots of Independent Network Charismatic Christianity in the Calvary Chapel and Vineyard movements of the late 1960s and 1970s, and John Wimber as the individual with whom many of the early INC leaders had a connection. Controversies within the Vineyard in the late 1980s and early 1990s — specifically the Vineyard's association with the Kansas City Prophets and the Toronto Blessing — culminated in some leading figures within the early Vineyard leaving the movement; rather than establishing their own churches or denominations, these leaders formed a looser network which enabled individual leaders to build their own ministries without the limitations or responsibilities involved in managing groups of churches. These leaders, including C. Peter Wagner, Bill Johnson, Ché Ahn and Mike Bickle, focused their efforts on spreading their personal influence through these networks and the use of new media technologies.

== Demographics ==
According to research by Christerson and Flory, "INC Christianity is the fastest-growing Christian group in America and possibly around the world." While overall Protestant church attendance shrunk by 0.05% on average per year between 1970 and 2010, "independent neo-charismatic congregations", of which INC congregations are a subset, grew by an average of 3.24% per year in the same timeframe. INC Christianity has been particularly effective at attracting young people, especially millennials. Ostling has suggested that this appeal is the result of INC's more flexible model of Christian belonging which prioritises experience over theology, as well as its effective use of social media.

== Bibliography ==
- "Bringing Heaven to Earth". Heart and Soul. June 18, 2017. BBC. World Service.
- Daughrity, Dyron B. (2018). Rising: The Amazing Story of Christianity's Resurrection in the Global South. Minneapolis: Fortress Press.
- Christerson, Brad; Flory, Richard (2017a). The Rise of Network Christianity: How Independent Leaders are Changing the Religious Landscape. Oxford: Oxford University Press.
- Christerson, Brad; Flory, Richard (2017b). "How a Christian movement is growing rapidly in the midst of religious decline". The Conversation.
- Ostling, Richard (2017). "Is this the 'fastest-growing Christian group in America,' and perhaps the world?". Get Religion.
- Smith, James K. A. (2018). "How to Find God (on YouTube)". Los Angeles Review of Books.
