= International House of Prayer =

- International House of Prayer
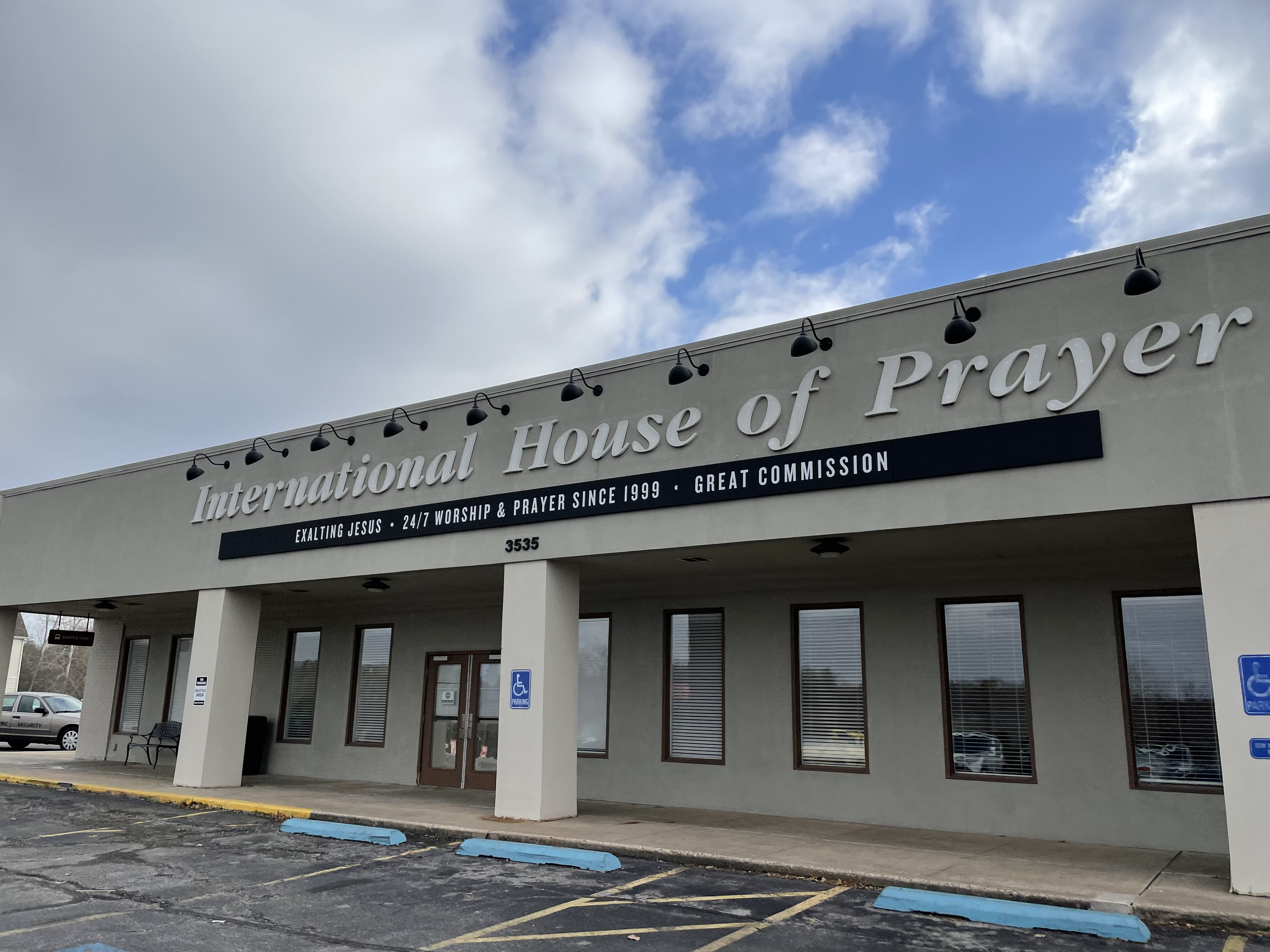
- The International House of Prayer in Kansas City, Missouri
- Location: Kansas City and Grandview, Missouri
- Country: United States
- Denomination: Non-denominational
- Churchmanship: Evangelical Charismatic
- Website: www.ihopkc.org

History
- Founded: May 7, 1999
- Founder: Mike Bickle

The International House of Prayer, Kansas City (IHOPKC), is an evangelical Christian movement and missions organization, based in the nearby suburb of Grandview and formerly in Kansas City.

It is best known for the Global Prayer Room, which has run continuously with live worship teams since September 19, 1999, and simultaneously broadcasts via its website and YouTube channel. Doctrinally, IHOPKC is evangelical, and affirms historic premillennialism. IHOPKC places great importance on the practices of Bible study, prayer, worship, fasting, and works of justice.

== Overview ==
=== History ===
The International House of Prayer of Kansas City (IHOPKC) was founded by Mike Bickle on May 7, 1999. The organization began in a small building off Grandview Road in Kansas City, Missouri, as a prayer room dedicated to worshiping Jesus night and day. Since that time, IHOPKC has grown and spread into several different locations throughout south Kansas City and Grandview, Missouri. As of November 2010, the church reported that it had over 1,000 staff and a student body of another 1,000 individuals.

On September 14, 2010, the International House of Pancakes announced that it was suing the International House of Prayer for trademark dilution and infringement. The lawsuit was dropped on December 21, 2010, with the dispute resolved out of court, and the International House of Prayer began abbreviating itself as IHOPKC.

=== Prayer Format ===
IHOPKC is best known for its prayer meetings, based on its "harp and bowl" worship model, which have been held 24 hours a day, seven days a week, 365 days a year, since September 19, 1999. These meetings, streamed live on the internet and through GOD TV, alternate regularly between music and prayer in two-hour sets through all hours of the day and night. The 24/7 meetings are held at IHOPKC's Global Prayer Room in Grandview.

=== Teaching ===
IHOPKC staff regularly teach on themes that include prayer, worship, the Great Commandment, the Great Commission, eschatology, and understanding God's spiritual purposes for Israel, along with spiritual gifts, nazirite consecration, and various other Charismatic themes.

=== Related organizations ===
IHOPKC operated a local church named Forerunner Church (previously Forerunner Christian Fellowship) that met on Fridays for Encounter God Services and on Sundays for regular services.

The Children's Equipping Center (CEC) was the children's ministry of IHOPKC and hosted yearly Signs and Wonders Camps in the summer. Student Ministries focused on junior high and high school students and hosted Awakening Teen Camps in the summer.

All auxiliary organizations including Forerunner Church, CEC, and Student Ministries ceased operations by summer 2024.

IHOPKC has provided advice and financial support to the anti-trafficking organization Exodus Cry, listing it as a "related tax-exempt organization" on their 2018 tax filings.

== International House of Prayer University ==
The International House of Prayer University (IHOPU) was an unaccredited Bible college with a campus at Grandview, Missouri. As of 2010, there were 1,000 full-time students enrolled. The educational process centered on 24/7 prayer and worship and had three distinct schools: Forerunner School of Ministry, Forerunner Music Academy, and Forerunner Media Institute.

IHOPKC offered five short term internship programs as an extension of the school: Intro to IHOPKC, One Thing, Fire in the Night, The Simeon Company, and Hope City.

In 2010, the school invested $6 million to renovate part of a strip mall in Grandview for use as a new campus.

In April 2024, IHOPKC announced it would shut down IHOPU and related internships following sexual abuse allegations against its founder Mike Bickle.

== Controversies ==
=== Mike Bickle's sexual abuses ===
On October 28, 2023, news broke that IHOPKC head pastor Mike Bickle faced allegations of sexual abuse from several women over a span of decades. The next day, the International House of Prayer announced that Bickle had been placed on sabbatical from all public ministry, pending investigation. IHOPKC subsequently contracted with Stinson LLP to conduct the investigation. Following a viral petition for IHOPKC to choose GRACE to lead the investigation, the church broke its contract with Stinson LLP and chose a local Kansas City law firm to lead the investigation.

On December 10, 2023, IHOPKC announced that it had hired a new third-party firm that it said would be independent and impartial in its investigation of claims against Bickle. IHOPKC also announced that it had hired Eric Volz, managing director of The David House Agency, to be its official spokesperson. Volz had made international headlines as a result of his wrongful imprisonment in 2006.

On December 22, 2023, IHOPKC announced that the internal investigation confirmed that Bickle had engaged in "inappropriate behavior" of a nature that required IHOPKC to "immediately, formally, and permanently" sever ties with him.

On February 7, 2024, The Kansas City Star published a firsthand account of Mike Bickle's grooming and sexual abuse of Tammy Woods in the 1980s beginning when Woods was 14 years of age and Bickle was in his mid-20s. The article details Woods' experiences, reason for not reporting until 2024, corroborating testimony from Woods' family and a close friend, and Bickle's attempt to communicate with Woods after the initial allegations were made known in 2023.

=== Ernie Gruen criticism ===
In early 1990, nine years before he founded IHOPKC, Mike Bickle—along with the church he then pastored, Kansas City Fellowship—was highly criticized by Kansas City pastor Ernie Gruen, of Full Faith Church of Love. Gruen delivered a series of sermons and published a well-circulated 233-page document titled "Documentation of the Aberrant Practices and Teachings of Kansas City Fellowship". The sermons and document criticized Bickle's teachings on eschatology and documented alleged cases of manipulative uses of prophecy at the Kansas City Fellowship. In it, Gruen accused KCF of promoting false prophets and deception. Gruen wrote, “A prophet who admits he is right only 40 percent of the time is not only a non-prophet, he is dangerous,” and specifically charged that Bickle had been deceived by Satan and that KCF "prophets" were prophesying by "familiar spirits."

=== Trademark infringement with IHOP ===
The International House of Prayer was one of the seven defendants named in a lawsuit filed in September 2010 by IHOP, the Glendale, California-based restaurant chain, alleging trademark dilution and infringement. The restaurant dropped the lawsuit in December 2010, with the dispute settled out of court, and the International House of Prayer began styling itself as IHOPKC.

=== Death of Bethany Deaton ===
On October 30, 2012, former IHOPKC intern Bethany Leidlein Deaton was found dead in an apparent suicide. Days later, IHOPU student Micah Moore came forward to Grandview police, and was subsequently charged with Deaton's murder. In statements to police, Moore stated that he was part of a religious group with Bethany and her husband, Tyler Deaton. Moore also stated, while in custody, that Tyler Deaton had used his apparent influence over the group to initiate homosexual experiences with several male members of their social–religious circle, primarily with Moore himself. He explained that he and Deaton were involved in a sexual relationship, but justified it under “religious experiences”.

It was allegedly through the coercion of this relationship that Moore claimed that group leader (and IHOPU graduate) Deaton ordered his wife's murder, to prevent her from telling her therapist about sexual assaults from other men (Tyler excluded) within the group. While IHOPKC materials and website listed Tyler Deaton as a division coordinator for IHOPKC friendship groups until five days after Bethany's death, IHOPKC officials said that Tyler's group was not connected to IHOPKC or known about by IHOPKC leadership. Melanie Morgan, one of Moore's lawyers, said in early December 2012: "The facts suggest Bethany Deaton’s death was an unfortunate suicide and Micah Moore had nothing to do with that suicide."

On October 31, 2014, the Jackson County, Missouri, prosecutor dismissed murder charges against Moore.

=== God Loves Uganda documentary ===
The 2013 documentary film God Loves Uganda suggests that North American evangelicals in general, and IHOPKC specifically, were responsible for Uganda's Anti-Homosexuality Bill.

== See also ==
- Mike Bickle
- Justice House of Prayer
- Pasadena International House of Prayer
- TheCall
- Youth with a Mission
- Lou Engle
