= Chuck Pierce =

American clergyman

Charles D. Pierce is the founder and current president of Glory of Zion International Ministries. He is most known for his self-proclaimed prophecies.

Pierce is an author of several books of prophecy and frequent speaker on the subject. In 1999 he was a founder, and is one of the current leaders of, the New Apostolic Reformation.

== Early Ministry ==
As of 1999, Pierce was vice president of Global Harvest Ministries.

== Glory of Zion International Ministries ==
Pierce is the founder and current president of Glory of Zion International Ministries, located in Corinth, Texas. Glory of Zion International Ministries is a Vertical apostolic network. It includes a 200,000-square-foot (19,000 m^{2}) former Boeing aircraft factory as its headquarters and Sunday worship center; 600 house churches where small groups meet to view the services online; 1000 associated 501(c3) nonprofits; and more than 100 privately owned businesses. All of these associated entities tithe to the ministry. In 2022, their total contributions were US $21 million.

== New Apostolic Reformation ==
In 1999 Pierce was a founder and is one of the current leaders of the New Apostolic Reformation (NAR), a term associated with fellow founder C. Peter Wagner. The New Apostolic Reformation is a neo-charismatic dominionist movement, run by the "spiritual oligarchy" of independent networks of apostles and prophets, which seeks to set up a theocracy in the United States. It intends to do this through the Seven Mountain Mandate, which states that Christians should control seven aspects of society: family, religion, education, media, arts and entertainment, business, and government. Pierce, along with fellow apostle Dutch Sheets, wrote the book Releasing the Prophetic Destiny of a Nation in 2005. It is an account of prophecies delivered by both authors while on a tour of the 50 states of the US. Those that participate in the NAR see themselves as being in a spiritual battle with demonic forces and expect that God will enter the war soon and deliver them to victory.

Pierce is a member of Wagner's Apostolic Council of Prophetic Elders, along with other prophets such as Cindy Jacobs, Mike Bickle, Dutch Sheets, and James Goll.

== Criticism ==
In her 2021 doctoral dissertation, "From Peter Wagner to Bill Johnson: The History and Epistemology of the 'New Apostolic Reformation'", Yvie Ruth Baker asserts that Pierce has employed several strategies for confounding verification of his prophesies. These strategies included the fact that "contexts given for these [prophesies] usually were unrecorded or private, hence not traceable". For the prophesies that Baker was able to trace, "I found that the claim was either fabricated, details were changed, or his prophecies differed substantially in meaning and intent from his later claim. These included his claims to have predicted the September 11 attacks, Hurricane Katrina, Trump's election in 2016, and the COVID-19 virus."
