= Cindy Jacobs =

American Christian prophet and teacher

- Born: August 1951 (age 75); San Antonio, Texas, U.S.
- Education: Pepperdine University, Malibu (B.A.)
- Occupations: Christian speaker, author, teacher
- Known for: Cofounder of Generals International
- Movement: New Apostolic Reformation
- Partner: Mike Jacobs
- Children: 2
- Website: www.generals.org/about-mike-and-cindy

Cindy Jacobs (born August 1951) is an American Independent Charismaticspeaker, author and teacher, and member of C. Peter Wagner's New Apostolic Reformation movement. With her husband, Mike Jacobs, she cofounded Generals International, a prayer and spiritual warfare organization, in 1985.

She has been called "one of the most influential American prophets" by The New York Times.

== Early life and education ==
Jacobs was born in San Antonio, Texas, and grew up in a Baptist family. From a young age, Jacobs felt she was supernaturally gifted; she also states that when she was only nine years old, she heard a call from God to read Psalm 2:8, and that this was decisive for her future as an international speaker.

She attended Grand Canyon University, where she began to engage in aspects of Charismatic belief such as speaking in tongues. In 1973 she married Mike Jacobs. Two years later, she earned a B.A. in Music from Pepperdine University, Malibu, California.

In her 30s, while involved in Latter Rain circles, Jacobs began to prophesy and preach.

== Career ==
Part of the Independent Network Charismatic Christianity movement – more specifically C. Peter Wagner's New Apostolic Reformation (NAR) – Jacobs was highly influential upon Wagner's views on spiritual warfare, which have propagated throughout the NAR and to some extent into evangelicalism. In 1985, Jacobs and her husband founded Generals of Intercession (now Generals International), a prayer and spiritual warfare organization. Since 1999, Jacobs has been a prophet at Wagner's Apostolic Council of Prophetic Elders, along with Dutch Sheets, Chuck Pierce, James Goll, Mike Bickle, and others. She is also part of other evangelical organizations and movements, such as Global Prophetic Consultation and Christ for the Nations Institute.

== Publications ==
Jacobs has written several books, including the bestsellers Possessing the Gates of the Enemy, The Voice of God and Women Rise Up!, and is the editor of the Women of Destiny Bible.

== Trump prophecy ==
A fervent supporter of Donald Trump, Jacobs said in an interview with Sid Roth that the number (20)17 (the year Trump began his administration) meant "complete victory". Additionally, the year 5777 in the Hebrew calendar (equivalent to 2016–2017 in the Gregorian calendar) would be the year of the "crowned sword", meaning the coming of a great authority, where the "sword of God" would cut off and all the evil intentions of "our enemies". She cited several prophets who had predicted that Trump would begin his administration at age 70, and that in fact, he was inaugurated at 70 years, seven months and seven days; that Trump would have been called by God to take over the United States government and that he would be anointed.

== Word of the Lord 2024 ==
General International, an evangelistic organization created by Cindy Jacobs, published in its "Word of the Lord 2024" a warning for the United States. The warning is part of a compilation of supposed messages received from the Holy Spirit, by a group of 200 prophets from around the world, which would be "representative of different ethnicities and socioeconomic groups". The message says:

The 2024 election is critical. The nations are watching this coming election to decide their timetable and direction for war. If a war-time president is not elected, fueled by the prayers of war-time intercessors, then our enemies will see us as weak and plan their attacks. 2025 is a potential year for wars to break out on a much larger scale.

== Controversies ==
- In his book Hard-Core Idolatry: Facing the Facts, C. Peter Wagner describes that the Holy Spirit came to Cindy Jacobs and "told her that in [the Argentinian city of] Resistencia they must burn the idols, like the magicians did in Ephesus. Ed Silvoso, Cindy Jacobs and the Resistencia pastors agreed". The list of items to be burned:

...the kinds of material things that might be bringing honor to the spirits of darkness: pictures, statues, Catholic saints, Books of Mormon, pictures of former lovers, pornographic material, fetishes, drugs, Ouija boards, zodiac charms, good luck symbols, crystals for healing, amulets, talismans, tarot cards, witch dolls, voodoo items, love potions, books of magic, totem poles, certain pieces of jewelry, objects of Freemasonry, horoscopes, gargoyles, native art, foreign souvenirs, and what have you.

- In March 2020, Jacobs led a global day of prayer for the end of the COVID-19 pandemic. In November 2019, she and other prophets held a meeting in Dallas; none predicted the COVID-19 pandemic.
- On January 6, 2021, Cindy Jacobs was in front of the United States Capitol, "where she and others prayed, prophesied and sang songs" as the building was attacked.

== Personal life ==
Jacobs and her husband have two children, Daniel and Kyrin.

== See also ==
- Apostolic–Prophetic Movement
- Dominion theology
- Neo-charismatic movement
