= TheCall =

Prayer meeting organization

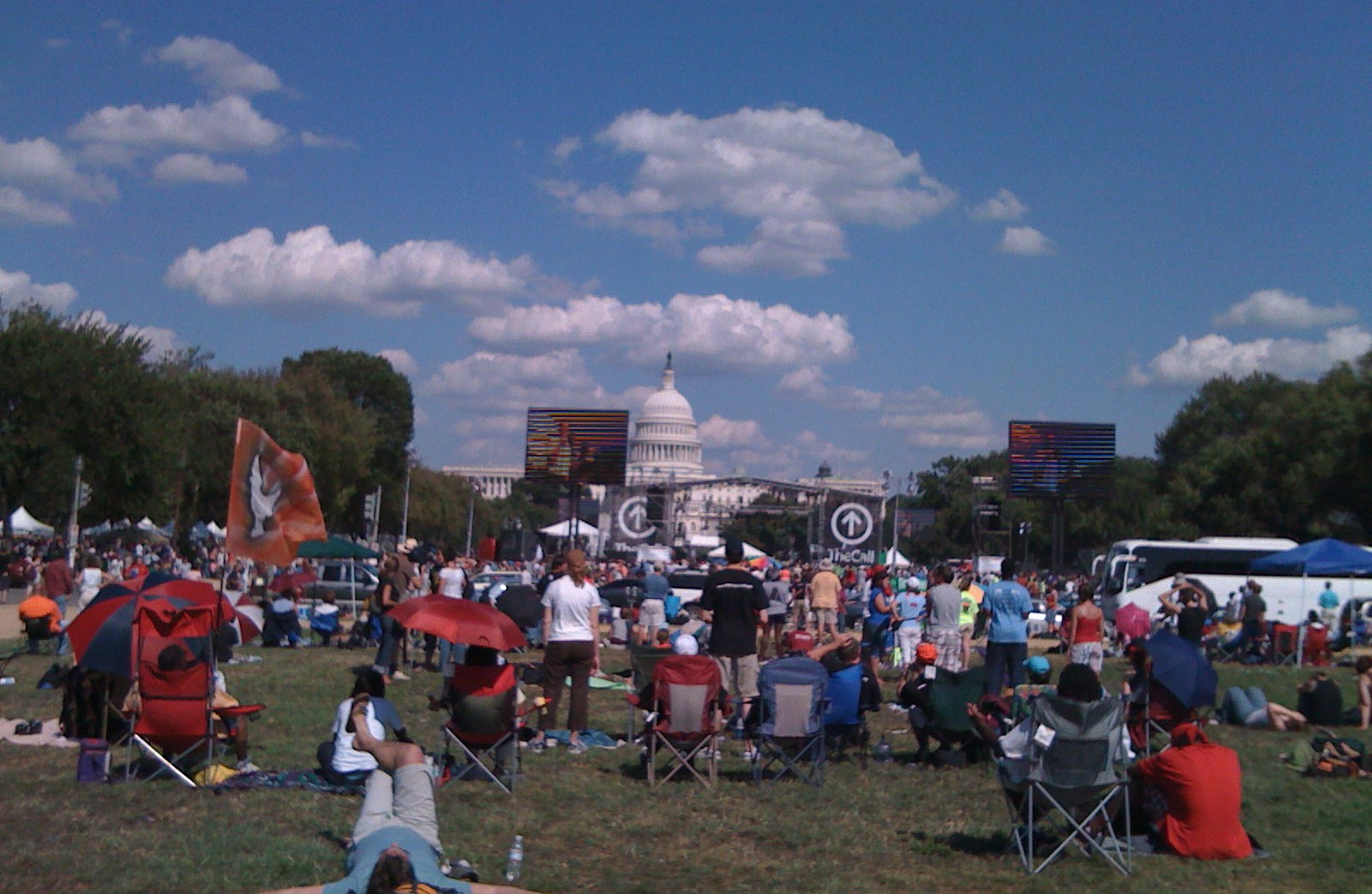
TheCall D.C. August, 2008

TheCall was an organization which sponsored prayer rallies led by Lou Engle along with other Christian leader pastors in the United States. The events requested prayer and fasting by Christians in protest against issues such as same-sex marriage and abortion. TheCall drew support from American Evangelical leaders, but was also criticized for intolerance.

In October 2018, Lou Engle announced the end of TheCall organization and stated that he would focus on his newest endeavor, Lou Engle Ministries. TheBriefing, an email newsletter rallying followers around political issues pertaining to TheCall's goals and giving prophetic assignments for intercession, has been continued by Engle's friends, Paul and Cheryl Amabile.

== Events ==
TheCall began in September 2000 after Lou Engle believed he received a prophecy to hold a large youth rally at the National Mall in Washington, D.C. New Apostolic pastor and apostle Ché Ahn led the event, while Engle held a prophetic role. Originally planned as a co-ed youth version of Promise Keepers, the event was intended as a "counter [to] what Engle and Ahn viewed as a creeping cultural tendency towards apostasy, particularly through the liberalizing US courts and the toleration of abortion." Between 300,000 and 500,000 attendees were present at the first rally, with participants fasting throughout the day, worshipping, and blowing shofars. Further TheCall events would then be held in cities around the country. Engle believes that gatherings such as TheCall are necessary to prevent divine judgment from taking place in the United States due to legalized abortion and the acceptance of homosexuality in American culture.

TheCall's 12-hour or 24-hour events combined prayer, sermons, and Christian rock worship and gospel music. The events are also known for their cultural and ethnic diversity, described in National Review as "the Breakfast Club of religious gatherings." Speakers at TheCall events frequently draw parallels between the pro-life movement and the Civil Rights Movement. TheCall is meant to be a gathering of fasting and prayer to confess personal and national sins, to pray for God's blessing on the nation, and for spiritual awakening among youth. Personal and national repentance among Christians and prayer for spiritual awakening has been the core focus of TheCall since its inception. The events have focused on prayer and sermons against abortion and homosexuality. TheCall events have been attended by prominent evangelical leaders such as Mike Huckabee, James Dobson, and Tony Perkins.

Religion scholar Matthew D. Taylor argues that TheCall DC was highly influential – that the event and its New Apostolic Reformation (NAR) leaders "helped create the very mass-gathering, prayer-and-warfare styles that were on display on January 6 [2021]."

== Controversy ==
=== Uganda ===
On May 2, 2010, Engle traveled to Uganda and organized a TheCall rally at Makerere University in Kampala, Uganda. Before the trip he condemned the harsh penalties proposed in a bill that called for life imprisonment or the death penalty for Ugandan homosexuals with AIDS who engage in sexual relations, saying his ministry could not support it. Engle later said the church should examine its own sins and oppose violence against homosexuals, but he did not reject the criminalization of homosexuality.

=== Detroit, Michigan ===
In 2011, a TheCall rally was held in Detroit, Michigan, where there is a significant Muslim population. "[Calls] to 'take back the land' of Muslim Americans" by engaging in spiritual warfare prayer over mosques, described as "like sending our special forces into Afghanistan", drew concern. An apostle stated the event was "not divisive at all" and that they were "praying for God to move in Detroit ... so that we can all be one"; the event's goal was to get African Americans to convert local Muslims, who would then convert others in the Middle East. Baptist, Methodist, and Catholic clergy protested the event.

== In American politics ==
TheCall has multiple supplementary movements and alternative names for their events that are focused on different areas of interest to the group. This includes TheResponse, which was a chain of stadium revivals focused on rallying audiences towards different topics or political candidates. Another event sponsored by TheCall and Lou Engle was RiseUp. The event was held in Washington D.C. on October 9, 2017, and was created for Christian women to become advocates within the political sphere. Speakers at this event led prayers for political figures such as Donald Trump and Barack Obama. Attendees were asked to pray for millions of children to be adopted, for the overturning of Roe v. Wade and for “the reform or the resigning of judges” within the Supreme Court. TheCall focused again on rallying Christian women in 2017 with the Esther Fast. The three-day fast held from March 8–11, 2017, called for women to pray for the support of the President of the United States, the ending of witchcraft, removing anti-semitic beliefs in America, and for the reversal of Roe v. Wade.

=== Political endorsements ===
==== Rick Perry ====
On August 6, 2011 Rick Perry and Lou Engle held TheResponse. This event was an all-day prayer rally held in Houston at the Reliant Stadium in which Engle called for prayer and fasting in support of Perry's presidential campaign. Prior to this, two Texan pastors, Tom Schlueter of Arlington and Bob Long of San Marcos, contacted Perry in hopes to share a new revelation that God had ordained Texas to be the "Prophet State" and that he was anointed by God to lead the state and nation into revival. Perry further promoted the belief that TheResponse was prophesied and anointed through the Book of Joel. At this event, Engle told the audience that the day Perry announced his presidential campaign, it rained heavily for five hours. He then went on to say that some see this as a sign of God's blessing on Perry's presidency.

== Associated people ==
=== Christian figures ===
- Cindy Jacobs
- Dutch Sheets
- Alice Patterson
- Doug Stringer
- Jim Garlow
- James and Shirley Dobson
- Tony Evans
- Tony Perkins
- Michael W. Smith

=== Politicians ===
- Sam Brownback
- Sarah Palin
- Newt Gingrich
- Michele Bachmann
- Ted Cruz
- Mike Huckabee

== Gatherings ==
- September 2, 2000 (Washington, D.C.) – estimated between 300,000–500,000
- October 3, 2002 (Seoul, South Korea) – estimated 30,000
- February 22, 2003 (Pasadena, California)
- March 1, 2005 (Gunsan, South Korea)
- July 7, 2007 (Nashville, Tennessee)
- April 5, 2008 (Montgomery, Alabama) – estimated 20,000
- August 16, 2008 (Washington, D.C.)
- May 2, 2010 (Kampala, Uganda)
- November 11, 2011 (Detroit, Michigan)
