= Mike Bickle (minister) =

American Evangelical Christian leader (born 1955)

- Bickle in 2011
- Born: Michael Leroy Bickle; July 17, 1955 (age 71); Kansas City, Missouri, U.S.
- Occupations: Former pastor, International House of Prayer

Michael Leroy Bickle (born July 17, 1955) is a former American evangelical leader and founder of the International House of Prayer (IHOPKC). Once the leader of IHOPKC, Bickle oversaw several ministries and a Bible school until his dismissal in December 2023 after confessing to sexual misconduct. Bickle has also been accused of child sexual abuse.

== Ministry ==
Bickle became an evangelical Christian at fifteen at a Fellowship of Christian Athletes student conference in Colorado.

Bickle claims to have had several encounters with God during his ministry, including hearing the audible voice of God and being taken to heaven twice. Bickle's accounts of supernatural encounters were disputed following his confession to sexual misconduct.

In 1999, Bickle stopped working for the church that he was pastoring, Metro Christian Fellowship, and started the International House of Prayer (IHOPKC). IHOPKC is known for its daily prayer meetings that are held 24 hours a day since September 19, 1999. IHOPKC also established a Bible college, known as the International House of Prayer University and internships for young adults, all of which closed after Bickle confessed to sexual misconduct. At its height, the ministry consisted of approximately 2,500 full-time staff members, students, and interns.

IHOPKC organized an annual Onething conference at the Kansas City Convention Center. In 2010, the event saw around 25,000 young adults in attendance. The conference focused on worship music and sermons on prayer, evangelism, and Christian eschatology. The final conference was held during the last week of 2018.

Bickle endorsed Ted Cruz for president in 2016.

IHOPKC's leadership placed Bickle on administrative leave in November 2023 due to allegations of abuse. After Bickle's confession and more allegations coming to light, IHOPKC cut all ties with Bickle on December 23, 2023.

== Theology ==
Bickle's teachings focused on eschatology, prayer, and fasting, with a particular emphasis on passion for Jesus, the first commandment, and prophecy. Bickle also taught the Song of Songs which he interprets as an allegory of the relationship between the body of believers (that is, the church) and God. Bickle also taught on God's spiritual purposes for Israel. He believes that it important for Christians to pray for the spiritual salvation of the Jews.

For a time, Bickle was affiliated with John Wimber's Vineyard movement, before leaving it in 1996.

== Reception ==
There has been criticism of Bickle's theology and ministry practices. Aspects of his ministry which have been particularly controversial include his view of the prophetic ministry. Bickle's ministry was criticized for the sexual activities of some of the ministers that were closely connected with his ministry in the 1980s and 1990s, including Bob Jones and Paul Cain, though neither was directly involved with Bickle's ministry for several years as a result.

However, as of 2017, Bickle continued to praise Bob Jones and would credit him with the start of the International House of Prayer with no mention of the sexual abuse.

In 1990 Kansas City pastor Ernest Gruen published a report entitled "Documentation of the Aberrant Practices and Teaching of the Kansas City Fellowship (Grace Ministries)". After the publication of this document, Bickle announced that he was submitting to John Wimber's oversight and joined the Association of Vineyard Churches in part to address the issues raised by his critics. Bickle later noted that "We were tempted to say that the attacks were all of the devil. In retrospect, we see that God's hand in all of this – even using the things that came from Satan's hand as well. Some of the criticisms were valid (especially concerning our pride); others were not." Since that time, IHOP of Kansas City reported that the two had reconciled and forgiven one another, although an email reportedly from Gruen suggests no such change of mind on Gruen's part.

Prior to his dismissal for sexual misconduct, Bickle's ministry was endorsed by several American charismatic leaders, including Dr. Jack W. Hayford, Loren Cunningham, and C. Peter Wagner.

Bickle came under fire from the Anti-Defamation League for controversial statements deemed by them as antisemitic and intolerant of Jews.

== Allegations of sexual abuses ==
On October 28, 2023, news broke that Bickle faced allegations of sexual abuse from women over several decades. The next day, International House of Prayer announced that Bickle had been placed on administrative leave from all public ministry pending investigation. IHOPKC subsequently contracted Stinson LLP to conduct the investigation. Following criticism about its decision to hire Stinson LLP, the organization chose instead a local Kansas City law firm to lead the investigation.

On November 30, 2023 "Jane Doe" alleged that Bickle sexually abused her from 1996 to 1999, starting when she was 19. He was 42.

On December 12, 2023, Bickle confessed to past misconduct, while denying some of the allegations.

On December 22, IHOPKC announced that the internal investigation confirmed Bickle had engaged in "inappropriate behavior" of a nature that required IHOPKC to "immediately, formally, and permanently" sever ties with him.

On February 7, 2024, the Kansas City Star published a first-hand account of Bickle's grooming and sexual abuse of Tammy Woods in the 1980s beginning when Woods was 14 years of age and Bickle was in his mid-20s. The article details Woods' experiences, her reason for not reporting until 2024, corroborating testimony from Woods' family and a close friend, and Bickle's attempt to communicate with Woods after the initial allegations were made known in 2023.

On February 3, 2025; Tikkun Global, a Messianic Jewish group which was partnering with Firefly Independent Sexual Abuse Investigations in handling the investigation of the allegations against Bickle, issued a report stating that 17 people came forward reporting that they had either been sexually abused or experienced sexually abusive misconduct (which included spiritual abuse and rape) from Bickle dating to the mid-1970s; with some of the victims being minors at the time of the actions in question.

In March 2025, survivors including Tammy Woods testified before Missouri lawmakers in support of legislation to eliminate statute of limitations for child sexual abuse cases and ban non-disclosure agreements in settlements, with their advocacy contributing to the passage of Trey's Law in June 2025.

== Books ==
- Dynamic Intercession by Mike Bickle ISBN 0-85009-806-8
- Passion for Jesus: Perfecting Extravagant Love for God by Mike Bickle (1994) ISBN 0-88419-258-X
- Growing in the Prophetic by Mike Bickle (1996/2008) ISBN 978-1-59979-312-2
- The Pleasures of Loving God by Mike Bickle (2000) ISBN 0-88419-662-3
- After God's Own Heart by Mike Bickle (2003) ISBN 1-59185-230-7
- The Rewards of Fasting by Mike Bickle and Dana Candler (2005) ISBN 0-9776738-1-2
- The Seven Longings of the Human Heart by Mike Bickle and Deborah Hiebert (2006) ISBN 0-9776738-4-7
- Loving God by Mike Bickle (2007) ISBN 978-1-59979-175-3
- Passion for Jesus: Cultivating Extravagant Love for God by Mike Bickle (2007) ISBN 978-1-59979-060-2
- Growing in Prayer: A Real-Life Guide to Talking with God by Mike Bickle (2014) ISBN 978-1-62136-046-9

== See also ==
- International House of Prayer
- Pasadena International House of Prayer
- TheCall
- Youth with a Mission
- Lou Engle
- Justice House of Prayer
- Independent Network Charismatic Christianity
