= André Gagné =

Canadian religious studies academic

Academic background
- Education: Université de Montréal (BTh, MA); Université catholique de Louvain (PhD)

Academic work
- Discipline: Theology
- Institutions: Concordia University

André Gagné is a professor and chair of theological studies at Concordia University in Montreal, Canada.

== Education ==
Gagné has a B.Th. (2001) and Master of Arts (2003) from l'Université de Montréal, and a conjoint Ph.D. from l'Université catholique de Louvain and l'Université de Montréal (2008).

== Career and research ==
Gagné taught from 2005-2008 at the joint department of religious studies at Laurentian University. He is a full professor at Concordia University. Gagné is a Member of the Centre for the Study of Learning and Performance (CSLP), a research associate of the Centre de recherche Société, Droit et Religions de l'Université de Sherbrooke (SoDRUS), an Associate Member at the Institut d'études anciennes et médiévales de l'Université Laval (IÉAM), and a co-researcher with the Centre d'expertise de formation sur les intégrismes religieux, les idéologies politiques et la radicalisation (CEFIR). In 2017, he was Directeur d'études invité at École pratique des hautes études.

Gagné's scholarship focuses on the interpretation and reception of the Bible, political theology and global pentecostal and charismatic movements. He was also a collaborator on la bibliothèque copte de Nag Hammadi (BCNH) project at l'Université Laval from 2012-2019.

== Awards and honors ==
In 2016, Gagné received the Opinion Leader of the Year Award for his involvement with the media in connection with the religious right, fundamentalism, radicalization and religious violence. He has also been awarded the 2010 CCSL Outstanding Contribution Award for excellency in teaching and student mentorship. The same year, Gagné was awarded the New Scholar Award at Concordia University. The award recognizes outstanding scholarly achievement by a tenure-track faculty member.

== Books ==
- Gagné, André (2026). Chrétiens en quête de puissance. Présence globale et politique des pentecôtismes (in French). Genève: Labor et Fides. ISBN 2830919130.
- Gagné, André (2024). American Evangelicals for Trump: Dominion, Spiritual Warfare, and the End Times. Routledge. ISBN 9781032415680.
- Gagné, André; Guyver, Jennifer; Oegema, Gerbern (2021). Religion and Violence in Western Traditions. Selected Studies. Routledge. ISBN 9780367474362.
- Gagné, André (2020). Ces évangéliques derrière Trump. Hégémonie, démonologie et fin du monde (in French). Genève: Labor et Fides. ISBN 2830917243.
- Gagné, André (2019). The Gospel According to Thomas. Introduction, Translation, and Commentary. Turnhout: Brepols. ISBN 250358490X.
- Gagné, André; Loumakis, Spyridon; Miceli, Calogero (2016). The Global Impact of Religious Violence. Wipf and Stock. ISBN 978-1-4982-8306-9.
- Gagné, André; Gignac, Alain; Oegema, Gerbern (2016). Constructing Religious Identities during the Second Temple Period / Construction des identités religieuses à l'époque de la période du Second Temple. Louvain: Peeters. ISBN 9042933720.
- Gagné, André; Racine, Jean-François (2012). En marge du canon: études sur les écrits apocryphes juifs et chrétiens (in French). Paris: Cerf. ISBN 2204096091.
- Gagné, André; Gignac, Alain; Paquette, Sylvie (2011). Le vivant qui fait vivre: esprit, éthique et résurrection dans le Nouveau Testament : mélanges offerts à la professeure Odette Mainville (in French). Montréal: Médiaspaul. OCLC 1032993341.
