= Dutch Sheets =

American pastor and author (born 1954)

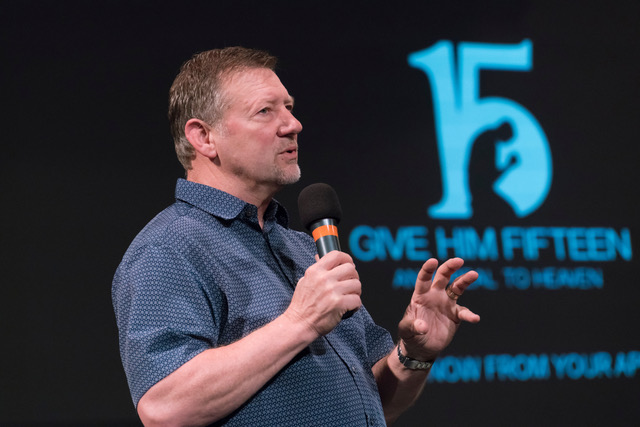
- Born: William Dutch Sheets; 1954 (age 71–72); Ohio, U.S.
- Education: Christ For The Nations Institute
- Occupations: Author and pastor
- Years active: 1979 – present
- Spouse: Ceci (m. 1977)
- Children: 2
- Website: dutchsheets.org

William Dutch Sheets (born March 10, 1954) is an American author and pastor affiliated with the New Apostolic Reformation movement who has written 23 books.

== Early life ==
Sheets was born in Ohio; his father was a Nazarene Evangelist and pastor. They cowrote the book, The Gold That Washed Ashore in 2007. He grew up in Middletown, Ohio, and began his undergraduate studies at Miami University of Ohio before transferring to Christ for the Nations Institute in Dallas, Texas. He graduated with a degree in Biblical Studies in 1978.

== Career ==
In 1979, Sheets became the worship leader and Student Ministry Director at Christ for the Nations Institute, where he was a student. In 1983, he began teaching at The Living Word Bible College in Middletown, Ohio, until 1986. He was an adjunct professor at Christian Life School of Theology in Dallas, Texas, from 1986 until 1999, as well as at Christ for the Nations Institute, his alma mater.

In 1991, Sheets founded Freedom Church in Colorado Springs, Colorado. He was the lead pastor until 2010, when he stepped down from his role to dedicate more time to writing and speaking. In 1995, he was awarded an honorary Doctor of Divinity by Christian Life School of Theology in Columbus, Georgia. In 1997, he founded Dutch Sheets Ministries, where he is the acting CEO and president. In 2012, he returned to Christ For the Nations Institute as the executive director, where he served for two years.

Sheets was named a Kentucky colonel by Commonwealth of Kentucky twice. He was first presented with the title by Governor Ernie Fletcher in April 2004 and later by Governor Steven Beshear in February 2011. Arkansas governor Asa Hutchinson named him an Arkansas Traveler in February 2021.

Sheets published his first book, Intercessory Prayer, in 1996. He followed this with 22 more (three as co-writer), primarily focused on prayer and Christian biblical teachings.

In 2015, Sheets released a daily prayer app called GiveHim15 whereby he encourages Christians around the globe to unite in prayer for 15 minutes each day.

Sheets is affiliated with C. Peter Wagner's New Apostolic Reformation movement and a member of Wagner's Apostolic Council of Prophetic Elders, along with other apostles including Mike Bickle, Cindy Jacobs, James Goll, and Chuck Pierce.

== Personal life ==
Sheets married Ceci in 1977 and had two children. She is the acting COO of Dutch Sheets Ministries.

== Advocacy ==
The Pine Tree Flag, also known as the "Appeal to Heaven" flag

In 2015, Sheets promoted Christian nationalism via the use of the Appeal to Heaven flag, which he claimed was symbolic of God's plan to restore the United States to its Christian roots. Following the 2020 presidential election, he used his GiveHim15 app as a real-time tool to discuss prayers related to election fraud. He said he is not registered with any major political party but actively promotes Donald Trump.

Religion scholar Matthew Taylor states that "no Christian leader did more to mobilize Christians to be in DC on January 6th than Dutch Sheets" and that Sheets prayed through speakerphone call at the event, engaging in spiritual warfare against the territorial spirits perceived at the Capitol. Sheets claimed the violence, which he condemned afterwards, was the result of demonic forces. He has not showed remorse for his role in what Taylor called "pouring on the gasoline and lighting the match" on January 6 and has not faced any prosecution as of 2024.

== Bibliography ==
- An Appeal to Heaven (Dutch Sheets Ministries, 2015) ISBN 978-1-5115-4007-0
- Authority in Prayer: Praying With Power and Purpose (Bethany House Publishers, 2006) ISBN 978-0-7642-1173-7
- Becoming Who You Are: Embracing the Power of Your Identity In Christ (Bethany House Publishers, 2007, 2010) ISBN 978-0-7642-0848-5
- Dream: Discovering God’s Purpose for Your Life (Bethany House Publishers, 2012) ISBN 978-0-7642-1021-1
- The Essential Guide to Prayer: How to Pray with Power and Effectiveness (Bethany House Publishers, 2001) ISBN 978-0-7642-1837-8
- Getting in God’s Face (Gospel Light Publications, 2006) ISBN 0830738010
- Giants Will Fall (Dutch Sheets Ministries, 2018) ISBN 978-0-692-05863-3
- God’s Timing for Your Life (Bethany House Publishers, 2001) ISBN 978-0-7642-1575-9
- History Makers (co-author) (Bethany House Publishers, 2004) ISBN 978-0-7642-1584-1
- How to Pray for Lost Loved Ones (Bethany House Publishers, 2001) ISBN 978-0-7642-1576-6
- Intercessory Prayer: How God Can Use Your Prayers to Move Heaven and Earth (Bethany House Publishers, 1996) ISBN 978-0-7642-1787-6
- Intercessory Prayer: How God Can Use Your Prayers to Move Heaven and Earth - Study Guide (Bethany House Publishers, 1996) ISBN 978-0-7642-1788-3
- The Gold That Washed Ashore (co-author) (Scribe Book Company, 2007) ISBN 9760066939
- The Pioneer Spirit (Independent Publisher, 2010) ISBN 978-1450747806
- The Pleasure of His Company: A Journey to Intimate Friendship with God (Bethany House Publishers, 2014) ISBN 978-0-7642-1333-5
- The Power of Hope (Charisma House, 2014) ISBN 978-1-62136-632-4
- Praying for America (Gospel Light Publications, 2001) ISBN 0830728953
- Praying Through Sorrows (co-author) (Destiny Image Publishing, 2005) ISBN 076842254X
- Releasing the Prophetic Destiny of a Nation (co-author) (Destiny Image Publishers, 2005) ISBN 0-7684-2284-1
- The River of God (Gospel Light Publications, 1998) ISBN 0830720758
- Second in Command (co-author) (Destiny Image Publishing, 2005) ISBN 0768422930
- Watchman Prayer: Protecting Your Family, Home, and Community from the Enemy’s Schemes (Chosen Books, 2000, 2008) ISBN 978-0-8007-9940-3
- The Way Back (Dutch Sheets Ministries, 2010, 2016, 2017) ISBN 978-0-692-79043-4
