= Lou Engle =

American Charismatic Christian leader

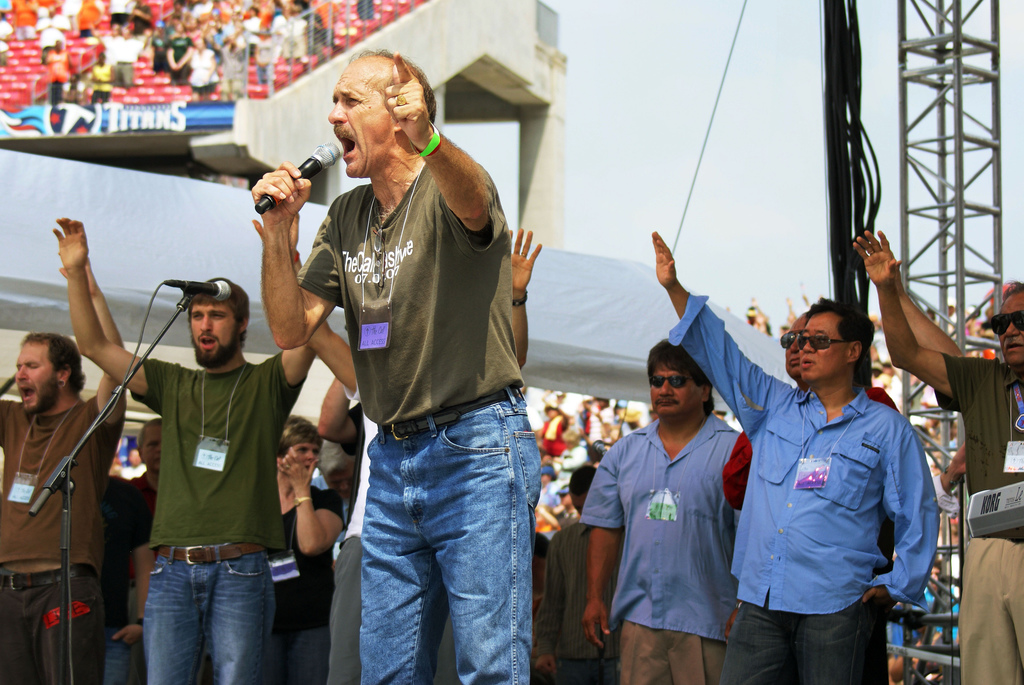
Lou Engle at TheCall Nashville

Lou Engle (born October 9, 1952) is an American Charismatic Christian who led TheCall, which held prayer rallies. He is an apostle in the New Apostolic Reformation movement and the president of Lou Engle Ministries. Engle was a senior leader of the International House of Prayer and has assisted in the establishment of Justice House of Prayer and several other smaller "houses" of prayer.

== Ministry ==
Engle has been organizing large prayer rallies since 1999, with hundreds of thousands of people in multiple countries participating. In 2018, Engle announced the end of the organization, TheCall, as well as his intentions to launch Lou Engle Ministries.

== Politics ==
The size of these events, in addition to Engle's political statements, raised his prominence among the Christian right. These ministries are often located near prominent landmarks, such as Harvard University and the United States Supreme Court building. The locations of the ministries are strategically chosen, to specifically contend issues such as abortion. Engle was described by Joe Conason as a "radical theocrat". He criticized other Evangelical leaders regarding the issue of political correctness.

Taking a firm stand on issues traditionally associated with the Christian right, Engle's events have drawn support from Evangelical leaders such as Mike Huckabee and Tony Perkins. In keeping with his stance on these issues, Engle has been sharply critical of former U.S. President Barack Obama, claiming that his beliefs "counter my convictions and the convictions of masses of believing Americans." In 2008, Engle became a supporter of vice-presidential candidate Sarah Palin, "likening Palin to the biblical Queen Esther who saved her people from destruction." He later wrote "[t]he ideological beast of Obama's worldview has been drawn out of its lair and now stands naked and exposed by Palin's compassion and conviction. The beast...is hunting our children, our nation's destiny, and us. The rage of the media against Palin simply further exposes the moral bankruptcy, bigotry, and lack of compassion of liberalism."

While living in Washington, D.C., Engle was briefly a roommate of then-Senator Sam Brownback. Brownback later spoke at TheCall Nashville rally and worked with him while drafting Senate apologies to Native Americans and African Americans. Brownback's association with Engle became an issue in his successful run for Governor of Kansas. During the campaign, the Kansas Democratic Party ran ads criticizing his association with Engle. Brownback stated that he had not spoken to Engle in several months and that they disagreed on some issues.

== Beliefs ==
Engle maintains that issues such as abortion and homosexuality should remain at the center of the evangelical movement and that appointing judges to overturn "Antichrist legislation" is key. An article in the Southern Poverty Law Center states up to 20,000 youth attendees of TheCall were annually called upon to fast and pray for 40 days and take up culture-war pledges to lead abstinent lives, reject pornography and fight abortion. In smaller circles, Engle's speech would occasionally "venture into bloodlust." Partnered with a militant group called Joel's Army, Engle leaned heavily on battle rhetoric and end-times theology. The articles goes on to describe Engle speaking with youth at the International House of Prayer, referring to his audience as an army of "warriors" and called upon the crowd for "vengeance."

=== Abortion ===
Engle strongly supports abolishing abortion. He encouraged his audiences to pray for the overturning of the Roe v. Wade Supreme Court ruling and to vote for anti-abortion political candidates. He organized 24-hour protests in front of the United States Supreme Court, whereby the young participants symbolized the powerlessness of terminated fetuses by placing tape over their mouths with the word "LIFE" written on it.

=== Views against homosexuality ===
In 2008, Engle focused the attention of his prayer groups towards supporting California's Proposition 8, a California ballot proposition and a state constitutional amendment intended to ban same-sex marriage.

In May 2010, Engle traveled to Uganda and organized a rally there through TheCall. During the rally, he praised the Ugandan government's efforts to combat homosexuality, and praised those promoting the Ugandan anti-homosexuality bill which called for life imprisonment or the death penalty for gays and lesbians with AIDS who engage in sexual relations. Prior to traveling to Uganda, Engle had released a statement condemning the penalties. The Southern Poverty Law Center has placed Lou Engle on their "Hatewatch Extremist" list due to his remarks supporting Uganda's bill to criminalize homosexuality and comparing the struggle over gay rights to the "Civil War."

GLAAD has added Engle to their Accountability Project, a catalog of politicians, commentators, organization heads, religious leaders, and legal figures, who have allegedly used their platforms, influence and power to spread misinformation and harm LGBTQ people.

=== Anti-Muslim comments ===
Following anti-Islamic comments at a 2018 Singapore conference hosted by Cornerstone Community Church, the Singapore Ministry of Home Affairs opened an investigation into Engle's inflammatory rhetoric. Organizers apologized to local Muslim leaders, and pledged not to invite Engle back to speak.

== Personal life ==
Engle and his wife Therese have seven children. He is known for his gravelly voice, cheerful demeanor, and vigorous rocking back and forth while praying and speaking. Engle wrote the foreword of the book The Magnificent Jesus (volume 1).

== Filmography ==
Engle's filmography includes being featured in the 2006 film Jesus Camp, briefly in the 2012 film Call Me Kuchu and in the 2013 film God Loves Uganda.

== Bibliography ==
- Possessing the Gates of the Enemy - A Training Manual for Militant Intercession (April 3, 2018)
- ________, Nazarite DNA, TheCall (March 12, 2015)

== See also ==
- New Apostolic Reformation
- Apostolic-Prophetic movement
