= Minnehaha, Spokane =

Minnehaha
- Spokane Valley Neighborhood
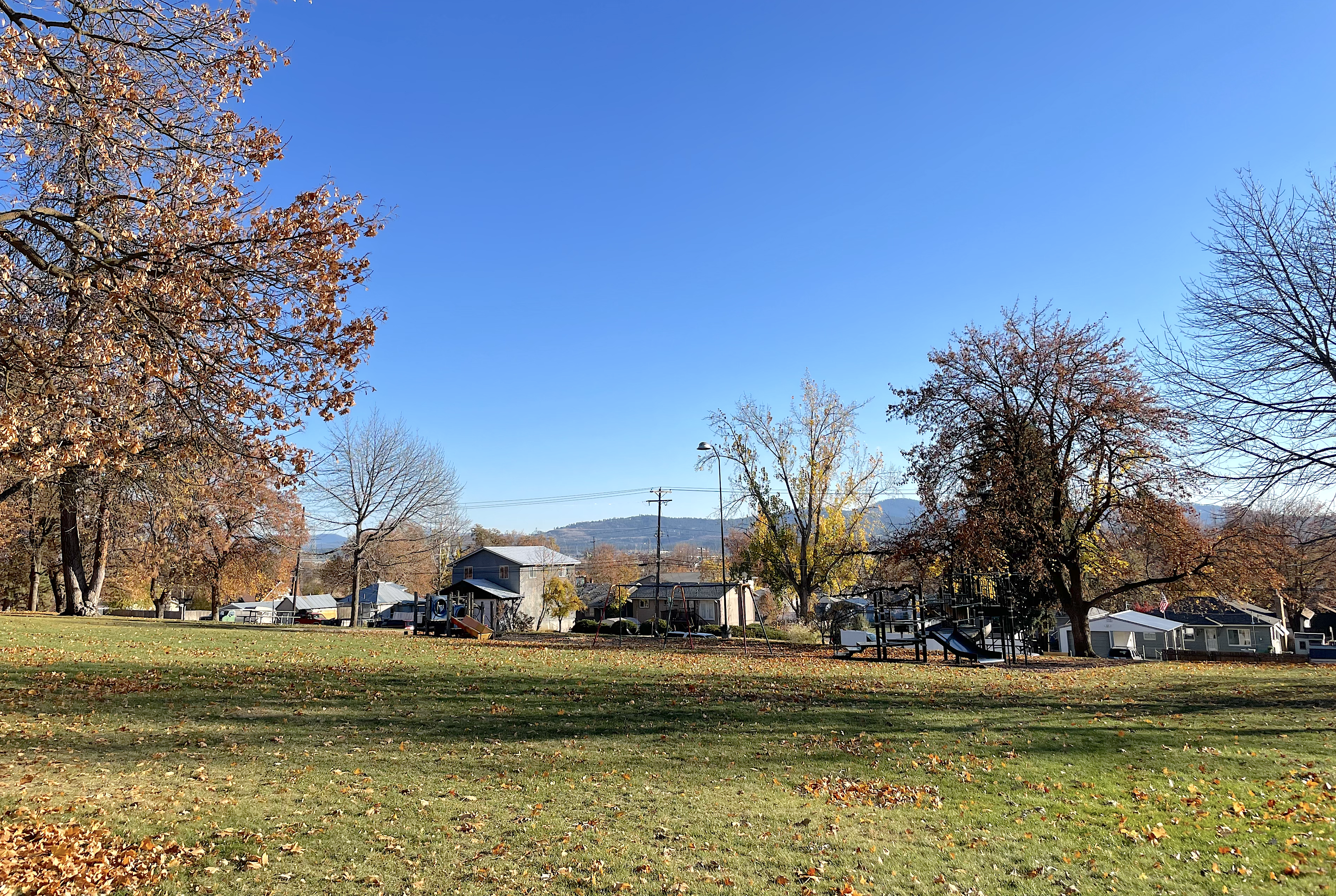
- View from Minnehaha Park

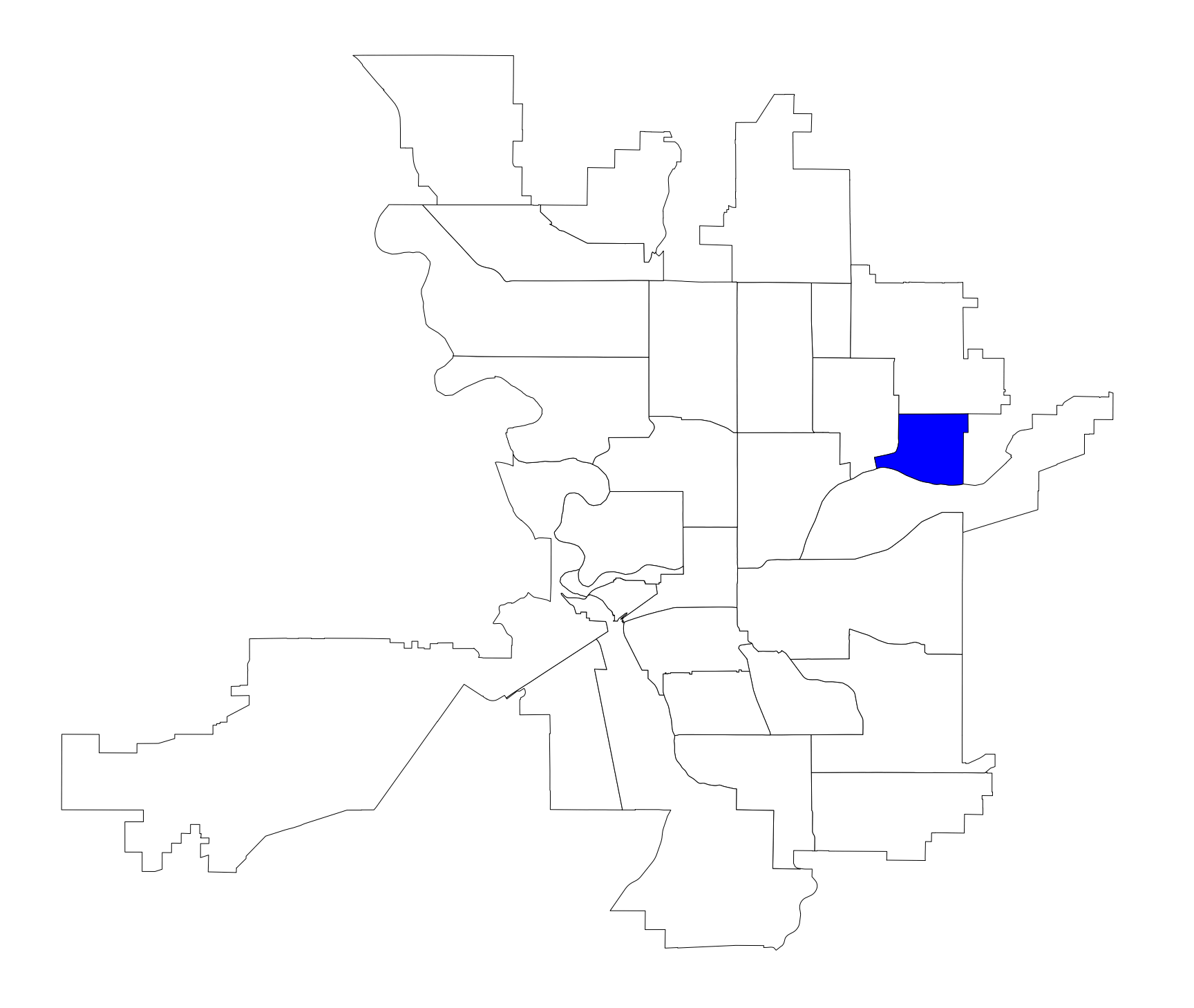
- Location within the city of Spokane
- Coordinates: 47°41′08.4″N 117°21′27.0″W
- Country: United States
- State: Washington
- County: Spokane
- City: Spokane

Population (2017)
  - Total: 3,897
- Time zone: UTC-8 (PST)
  - Summer (DST): UTC-7 (PDT)
- ZIP Codes: 99217
- Area code: 509

Minnehaha is a neighborhood in Spokane, Washington, located in the northeastern portion of the city. The Spokane River flows along the southern edge of the neighborhood, from which the terrain rises along the slopes of Beacon Hill to the northeast. It is a primarily residential neighborhood, with its main commercial district on Euclid Street shared with the adjacent neighborhoods of Bemiss and Hillyard. Minnehaha Park is located here, though the nearby Minnehaha Rocks are just beyond the neighborhood's bounds.

== Geography ==
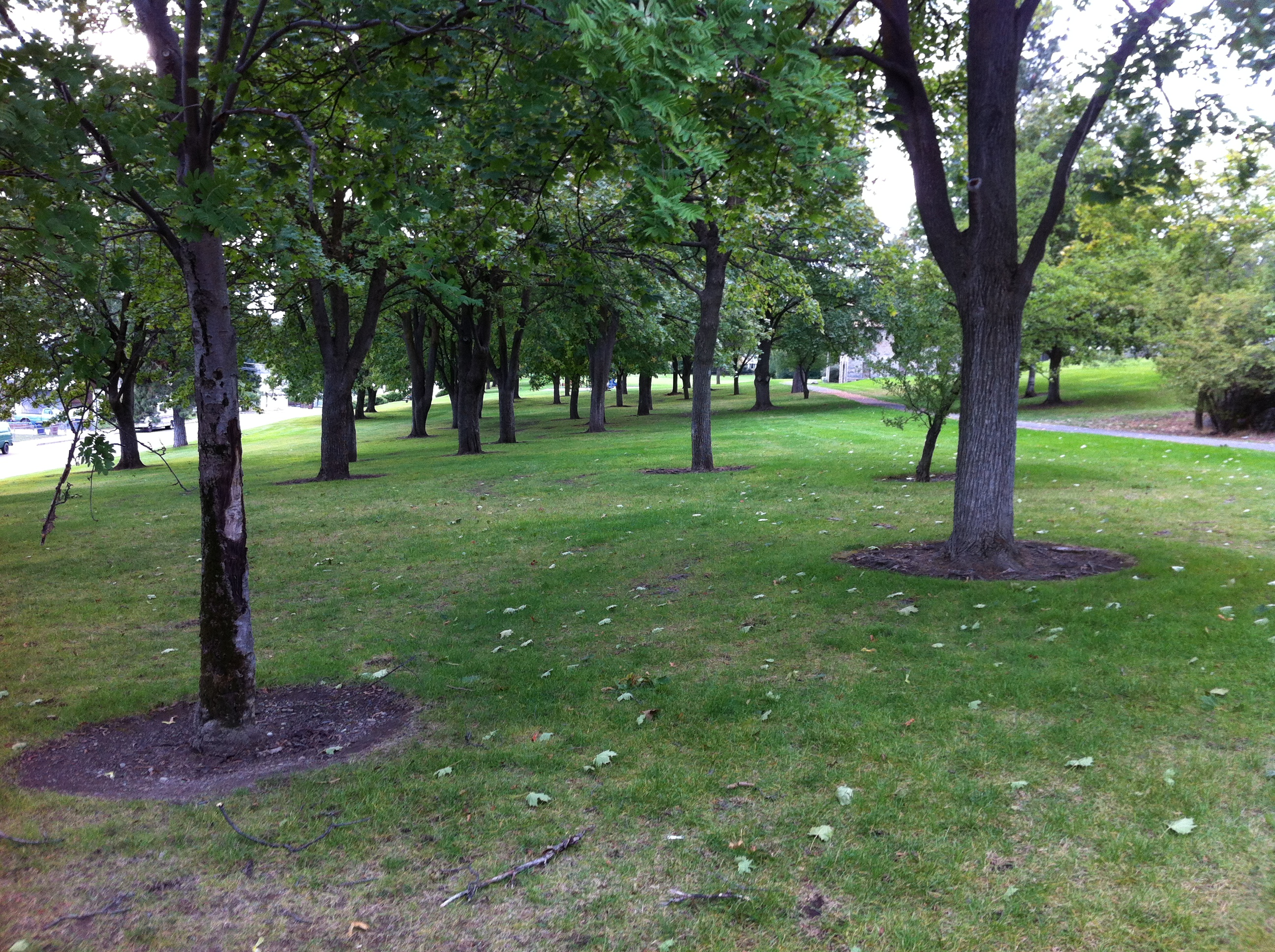
Lawn and trees at Minnehaha Park

Located 5 miles by road from Spokane City Hall in Downtown Spokane, Minnehaha is in the northeastern part of the city in City Council District 1. The Spokane River flows along Minnehaha's southern boundary and Beacon Hill rises to the northeast. Greene Street crosses the river from Minnehaha into Chief Garry Park to the south. Greene Street and Market Street are major north-south thoroughfares on the eastern edge of the neighborhood, as is Freya Street in the heart of Minnehaha. East-west arterials include Euclid/Frederick Avenues in the center of the neighborhood and Upriver Drive, which runs along the river in the south. The Spokane River Centennial Trail passes through the neighborhood along the banks of the river.

Minnehaha Park, the neighborhood's largest, is located in the northeast on the slopes leading up to Beacon Hill. It covers 39 acres and is a mix of landscaped lawns and native vegetation. The park facilities include a softball diamond, tennis courts, horseshoe pits, playground and restroom.

Garnet Avenue separates Minnehaha from Hillyard, to the north. Bemiss lies to the west, beyond Market Street, Illinois Avenue and Smith Street. The Spokane River forms the border with Chief Garry Park in the south. The city limits run along Havana Street in the east, beyond which lie unincorporated areas of Spokane County.

== History ==
The Spokane People inhabited the area that is now Minnehaha for thousands of years prior to the arrival of European settlers.

Edgar J. Webster, a lawyer and early settler in Spokane, settled in what is now Minnehaha Park in the late 1890s and discovered a mineral spring on the property. After the discovery, Webster turned the area into a spa. At the time located beyond the Spokane's city limits, but with the Ross streetcar line providing easy transportation to the area from the city center, Minnehaha developed a reputation as a place where wild and colorful activities, frowned upon inside of city limits, could take place. Webster's health spa and resort, however, were known as a temperance area. The dance hall on the property burned down in 1889, but a stone building from the health spa days still stands in Minnehaha Park. The site is now known for rumors that it is haunted by the ghosts of children who lived at an orphanage on park property, though there never was an orphanage at the site.

The health spa and resort days came to an end between 1909 and 1913, when the city purchased the property and set out to develop it as a park. Development began a decade later in 1924. Between the time the city made the purchase and when it got around to developing the location, multiple movie studios rented the land in order to film motion pictures.

Then North Spokane Corridor project has seriously impacted the neighborhood since it was undertaken in 1997. Construction on the freeway began in 2001 and is expected to be complete by 2029. Once construction is complete, it is estimated that around 500 homes and 150 businesses will have been demolished in Minnehaha and the other neighborhoods that the freeway route will pass through. The southern portion of the freeway, from just north of the Spokane River in Minnehaha south to its junction with Interstate 90, will be elevated. North from there, through northern Minnehaha, the route will pass at grade. This has resulted in a wide swath of now-vacant lots and blocked-off streets extending along the eastern edge of the neighborhood. Many neighborhood residents feel like their concerns about the project went unheeded by the Washington State Department of Transportation.

== Demographics ==
As of 2017, 3,897 people live in Minnehaha across 1,499 households. Persons aged 19 years or younger account for 28.4% of the population while those aged 65 and above account for 13.5% of the population. The median household income in the neighborhood is $47,477 and 6.5% of the population is unemployed. 12.7% of residents were born outside of the United States, with 29% coming from the Marshall Islands, 20.8% from Ukraine, 20.1% from Vietnam and 8.1% from Canada.

== Education ==
Minnehaha is served by Spokane Public Schools and home to Cooper Elementary. Cooper serves the bulk of the neighborhood, with the exception of the few blocks east of Greene Street along the Spokane River, which are served by Logan Elementary in the adjacent Logan neighborhood. Cooper feeds into Shaw Middle School and then John R. Rogers High School. Logan feeds into Yasuhara Elementary and then North Central High School.

== Transportation ==
=== Highway ===
- - (Future) U.S. 395 - to Colville (north) and Spokane (south)

Future U.S. 395 will pass north–south through Minnehaha along the North Spokane Corridor; under construction as of 2022.

=== Surface Streets ===
For cyclists, there is a dedicated bicycle lane on Upriver Drive, as well as the shared-use Spokane River Centennial Trail which runs alongside it. The trail connects Minnehaha with Downtown Spokane and beyond to the west and stretches out past the Idaho state line to the east. There is also a shared use path under construction to parallel the North Spokane Corridor.

Minnehaha is connected to the rest of the city's street system by Greene and Market Streets on the west, which are classified as "urban primary arterials" by the city. Secondary arterials, known as "urban minor arterials," in Minnehaha include Upriver Drive in the south, Freya Street north-south through the middle and Euclid/Frederick Avenues east to west through the middle. Greene Street is the only river crossing in the neighborhood.

=== Public Transportation ===
Public transit in Minnehaha is provided by the region's public transit provider, the Spokane Transit Authority.

Route	Termini			Service operation and notes	Streets traveled
33; Wellesley	Spokane Community College; SCC Transit Center	↔	Spokane Falls Community College; SFCC Transit Center	High-frequency route	Market
31; Minnehaha/Lidgerwood	Spokane Community College	↔	Dakota & Jay	Basic-frequency route	Greene, Carlisle, Freya, Marietta, Myrtle, Frederick, Market, Garland, Empire, Addison, Francis, Nevada
