= Whitman, Spokane =

Whitman
- Spokane Neighborhood
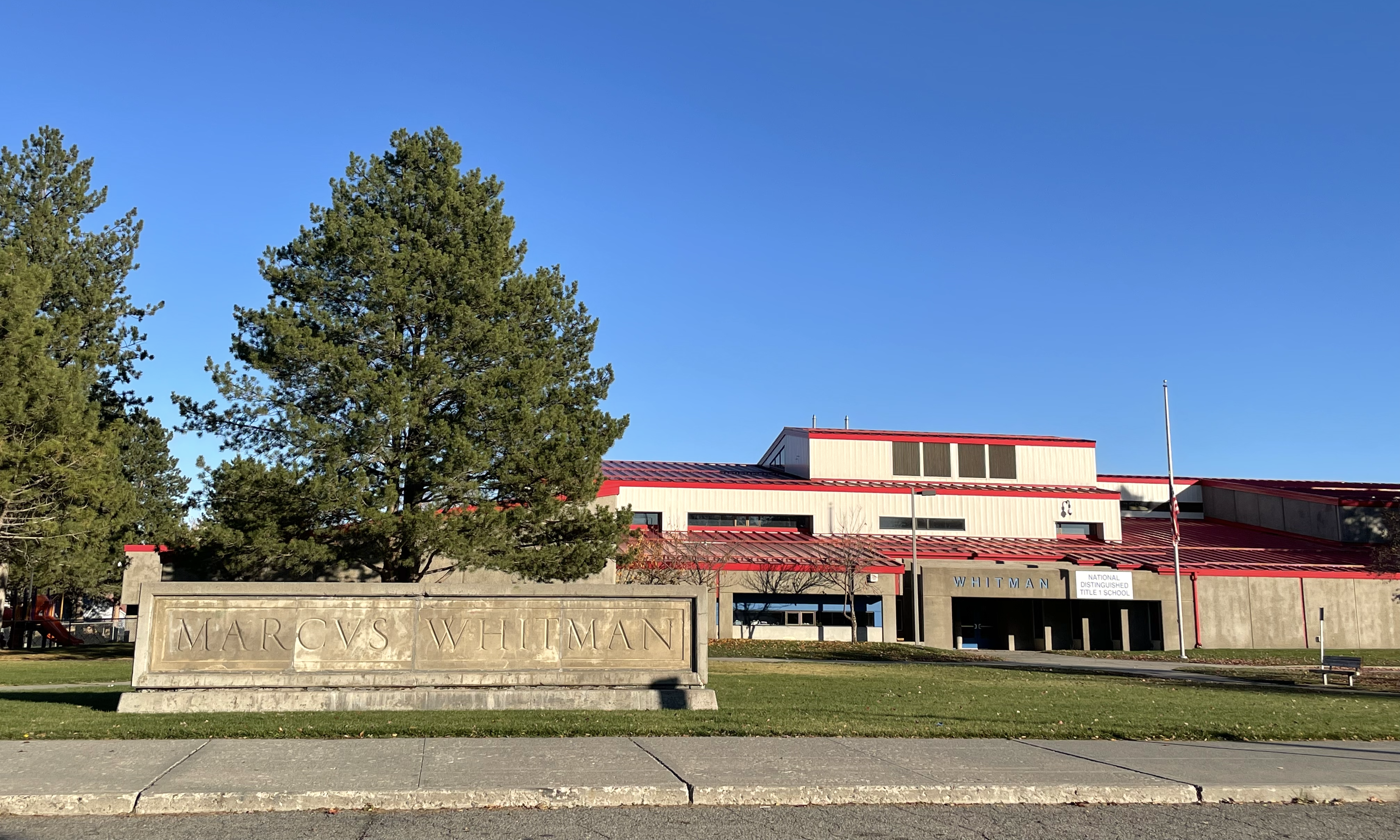
- Whitman Elementary

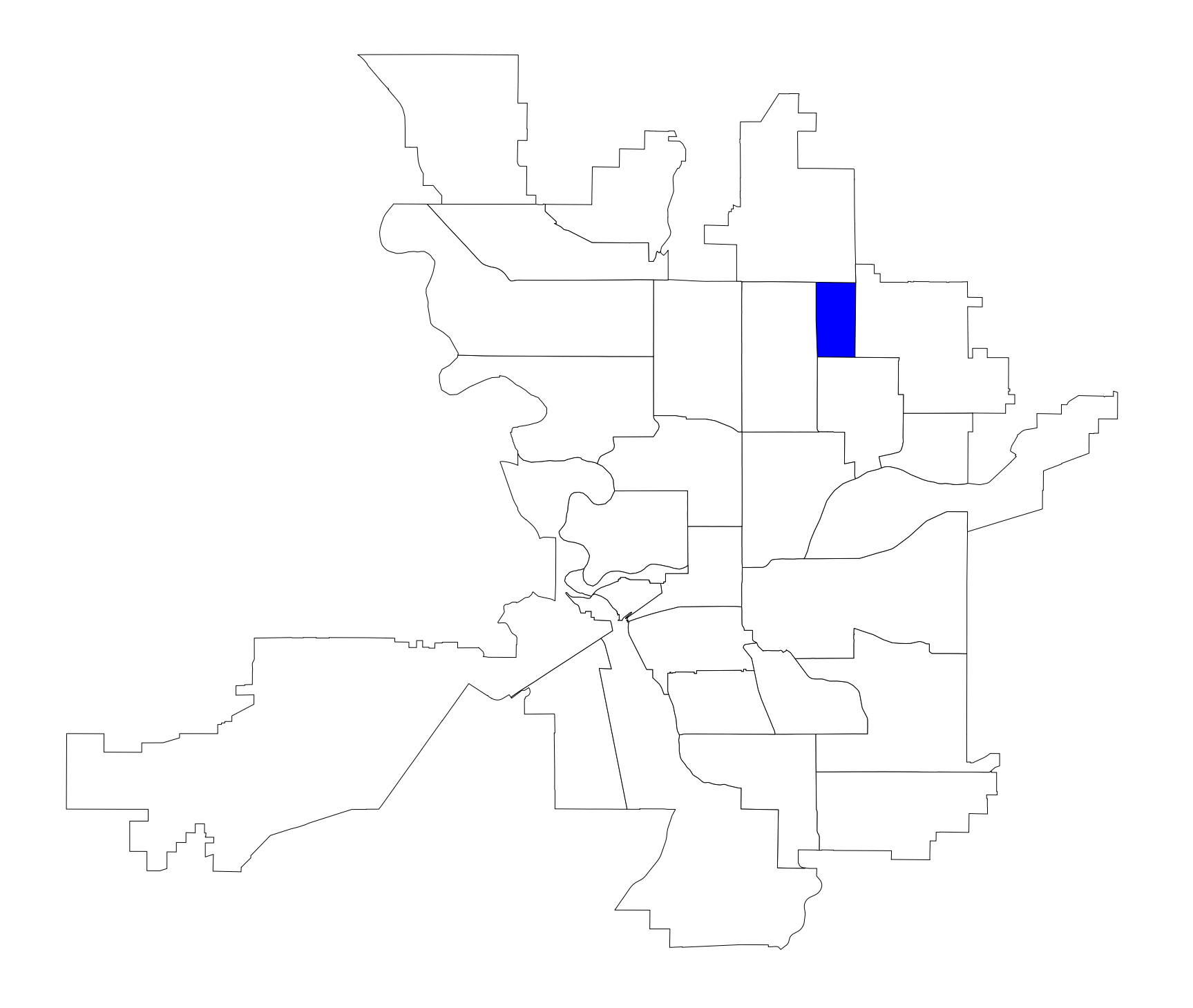
- Location within the city of Spokane
- Coordinates: 47°42′02.5″N 117°25′33.3″W
- Country: United States
- State: Washington
- County: Spokane
- City: Spokane

Population (2017)
  - Total: 3,741

Demographics 2017
  - White: 80.9%
  - Latinx: 7.1%
  - Asian/Native Hawaiian/Pacific Islander: 4.4%
  - American Indian/Alaska Native: 3.3%
  - Black/African American: 2.9%
- Time zone: UTC-8 (PST)
  - Summer (DST): UTC-7 (PDT)
- ZIP Codes: 99207, 99208
- Area code: 509

Whitman is a neighborhood located on the northeast side of Spokane, Washington. It is named for pioneer missionaries Marcus and Narcissa Whitman.

== History ==
The Spokane people have lived in what is now Whitman for hundreds of years. The area was annexed into the city of Spokane in 1907.

== Geography ==
Whitman is a rectangular neighborhood bordered by Francis Avenue on the north, Crestline Street on the east, Wellesley Avenue on the south and Perry Street on the west. It borders the Hillyard neighborhood to the east, the Bemiss neighborhood to the south, Nevada Heights in the west and Shiloh Hills in the north. It is six city blocks across east–west but shown as four blocks in the north and six in the south. There is little separating Whitman from Nevada Heights and Hillyard. Major arterials in Francis and Wellesley Avenues separate the neighborhood from Shiloh Hills to the north and Bemiss to the south, but lesser streets form the eastern and western boundaries. Whitman's boundaries outside of those two streets are not obvious on the ground. Whitman's connection to surrounding neighborhoods is strengthened by its presence in the Greater Hillyard-Northeast Planning Alliance, together with the Bemiss and Hillyard neighborhoods.

== Demographics ==
As of 2017, there were 3,741 residents in the neighborhood across 1,397 households, of which 33.3% had children. 38.7% of households were rented, compared to 45.3% citywide. 28.9% of the residents were aged 19 or younger, compared to 21.9% citywide. Those over 65 made up 11.1% of the population, compared to 14.5% citywide. The median household income was $41,156, compared to $44,768 citywide. 9.9% of the population has a bachelor's degree or higher while 40.6% have at most a high school diploma. The unemployment rate was 8.8% compared to 6.5% citywide. 79.6% of students qualify for free or reduced lunch, compared to 54.5% citywide. 93.7% of residents were born in the United States or one of its territories. Of those born elsewhere, 30.2% were from Vietnam, 24.7% from Ukraine, 19.4% from the Philippines and 9.6% from the Uzbekistan.

== Education ==
Whitman Elementary is located in the neighborhood and also serves the Whitman Neighborhood. After Whitman Elementary, students attend Garry Middle School in the adjacent Nevada Heights neighborhood. John R. Rogers High School, located across the street to the south of the Whitman neighborhood, serves the area's high school students.

== Transportation ==
=== Surface Streets ===
Whitman's roads aligned with the city's street grid and are connected to the rest of the city street system by a pair of primary artierals. Wellesley Avenue on the south and Francis Avenue on the north are both classified as primary arterials by the city, with Rowan Avenue and Crestline Street classified as minor arterials. The rest of Whitman's roads are considered to be local access.

For cyclists, there is a dedicated bike lanes on Crestline Street, while Central Avenue is a designated bike route without a dedicated lane.

=== Public Transit ===
The Spokane Transit Authority, the region's public transportation provider, serves Whitman with two fixed schedule bus lines.

Route	Termini			Service operation and notes	Streets traveled
33; Wellesley	Spokane Community College; SCC Transit Center	↔	Spokane Falls Community College; Spokane Falls Station	High-frequency route	Wellesley
27; Hillyard	Downtown Spokane; STA Plaza	↔	Balboa/South Indian Trail; Five Mile Park & Ride	Basic Frequency Route	Crestline, Francis
