= Nightmare Academy (disambiguation) =

Nightmare Academy is a 2002 novel by Frank Peretti, the second book in the Veritas Project series.

Nightmare Academy may also refer to:

- The Nightmare Academy series novels by Dean Lorey:
  - Nightmare Academy: Monster Hunters (2007) also released as Nightmare Academy: Charlie's Monsters (2008)
  - Nightmare Academy: Monster Madness (2008)
  - Nightmare Academy: Monster War also released as Nightmare Academy: Monster Revenge (2009)
