= The Challenge (2003 film) =

- DVD cover
- Directed by: Craig Shapiro
- Screenplay by: Elizabeth Kruger; Michael Swerdlick
- Story by: Michael Swerdlick
- Produced by: Neil Steinberg; Natan Zahavi
- Starring: Mary-Kate and Ashley Olsen
- Cinematography: Guy Livneh
- Edited by: Sherwood Jones
- Music by: James Levine
- Production companies: Dualstar Entertainment Group; Tapestry Films
- Distributed by: Warner Bros. Pictures; Warner Home Video
- Release date: November 15, 2003
- Running time: 97 minutes
- Language: English

The Challenge is a 2003 comedy film starring Mary-Kate and Ashley Olsen, their final direct-to-video production. It was produced by Dualstar Entertainment Group and Tapestry Films and released by Warner Bros. Pictures and Warner Home Video on November 15, 2003.

== Plot ==
Twin sisters, Shane and Elizabeth Dalton, live separately from one another on opposite ends of the country after their parents divorced years earlier. Shane, who lives with their mom in Los Angeles, is a chilled out, tree-hugging vegetarian who is very into nature and spiritual beliefs, while her estranged sister Lizzie, who lives with their dad in Washington, D.C. is a level-headed grade A student with a driven personality. However, unknown to each other, they both apply to be contestants on a reality game show filmed in Mexico called The Challenge, which tests contestants strength and survival skills in various challenges as they work as part of a team in order to win college scholarships.

Marcus, the head intern at "The Challenge", informs the show's producer, Max, of their distant relationship. Knowing they dislike each other, Marcus puts both girls on the same team, Team Mayan, as part of a scheme to boost the show's ratings. Backstage, Shane meets and becomes close to Adam, a laid-back jock who is put on the opposite team, Team Aztec. Team Aztec also includes Kelly, an overly-competitive swimmer, JJ, a ditzy "triple threat" with dreams of stardom, and Charles, a calm and intuitive city boy who plans to study psychotherapy. Along with Shane and Lizzie, Team Mayan also includes Anthony, an Italian-American food enthusiast, and Justin, a surfer and skater from sunny Florida. At their first meeting, Max informs the group of the rules, which include a prohibition on romantic entanglements between contestants, as it can result in disqualification from a challenge.

During the first challenge, Shane and Lizzie's bickering prevents them from working together, and Team Aztec wins the points. When Anthony and Justin make them realize that they'll need to pull together, they start putting aside their differences for the sake of the team. Over the first few days, Shane and Adam become more and more close, and Kelly suspects something is going on. At the same time, Lizzie starts hanging out behind the scenes with Marcus, although he is still being asked by Max to spy on the girls. Marcus finds out that Shane hates heights and that Lizzie is afraid of snakes, information which Max plans to use later on. Team Mayan win the fourth and fifth challenges, making the score 3-2 to Team Aztec, and Shane and Lizzie both start to respect what the other knows.

One night, the girls sneak out to meet Marcus and Adam; but they're followed by Max who fails to get video footage of their meeting. However, Kelly manages to take a picture of Adam and Shane kissing and shows it to Max. He disqualifies both of them from the next round, which Team Mayan eventually win, tying the score of the teams involved in "The Challenge". Team Mayan is given a boat party as reward for their victory, which Team Aztec have to cater for in costume. At the party, Marcus tells Lizzie that he's been behind Max's troublemaking, and she dumps him. Later on, Shane and Lizzie manage to patch things up with each other for good after realizing that they're not all that different from each other.

The final challenge will decide the winners of "The Challenge". It is an obstacle course featuring various challenges including walking harnessed on a bridge high over a canyon (incorporating knowledge about Shane's established fear) and then walking on narrow planks over a pit of snakes (reflecting Max's knowledge of Lizzie's fear). The girls help each other out and Team Mayan reaches the totem before the others, making them the winners. All of the contestants receive college scholarships. With the experience coming to a close, Kelly apologizes for the mistakes, Lizzie makes up with Marcus, and then the girls retaliate against Max by tipping slime on him while taking a picture.

The Challenge was Mary-Kate and Ashley's last direct to video production, so in a short scene at the end of the movie, some of the twins' boyfriends from past movies and TV-shows show up and begin arguing over who the girls loved more. This leads to the girls leaving together while saying, "Boys may come and go, but we'll always have each other—and that's not just in the movies."

== The contestants ==
=== Team Mayan ===
- Elizabeth Dalton (Ashley Olsen): A modern city girl living with her father in Washington DC; The more uptight twin. She is very detailed-oriented, which proves to be a bit of an advantage during later tasks in the game. She has a fear of snakes.
- Shane Dalton (Mary-Kate Olsen): A laid-back vegetarian who lives with her mother in San Francisco, California. she's Elizabeth's twin. Very peaceful and Zen-empowered, Shane uses yoga and pilates to find peace with the world. She is a afraid of heights. She wants to be an earth scientist.
- Anthony (Theo Rossi): An Italian-American boy who plans to use his winnings to go to culinary school. His goal is to be like Emeril Lagasse, and he is very fond of eating as well as cooking. He is implied to be a second-generation Italian-American, as during one scene, when he thinks he sees his mother, she is depicted as having a heavy Italian accent. Anthony becomes best friends with Justin.
- Justin (Zakk Moore): A typical 'surfer dude' from Orlando, Florida. Though he seems to be nothing but a fun-loving skater-boy from the start, he is depicted as having a very high IQ; he plans to study astrophysics and can easily answer questions during one task pertaining to pharmaceutical chemistry.

=== Team Aztec ===
- Adam (Lukas Behnken): An easy-going, average boy who plans to go to college to study journalism. He grows close to Shane early on the film. Like Shane and Lizzie's parents, Adam's parents are divorced.
- Kelly (Sarah Bastian credited as Sera Bastain): A very athletic, overly-competitive girl from Knoxville, Tennessee. She is seen to have a special talent for swimming, but her competitiveness makes her come off a bit anti-social and a bit antagonistic of not only the other team but her own team.
- JJ (Diana Carreno): A self-proclaimed "triple-threat" with dreams of stardom. Slightly ditzy and living in her own bubble. It's hinted that she may not be very intelligent as she initially thought she was auditioning for American Idol. In the end, she receives an invitation to be on the show.
- Charles (Ty Hodges credited as Eric Ty Hodges): A very calm, intuitive boy who plans to study psychotherapy. He is the one who tries to keep his team calm and ensure they are mentally focused. He also makes several efforts to bring Kelly back down to Earth when she lets her competitiveness get the best of her.

== The crew ==
- Max (Joe Michael Burke): The arrogant, fame-hungry host of "The Challenge" who will do anything to get ratings.
- Sasha (Jeannette Weegar credited as Jeanette Weegar): Max's redheaded assistant who only appears in a few scenes.
- Big Joe (Pablo Recasens): Max's right-hand man and camera man.
- Marcus (Brian Skala): The head intern at The Challenge; he turns out to be the only intern there. He's from L.A and wants to direct films in his future.
