= Rich Cowan =

American film director

- Born: Richard Martin Cowan; February 7, 1956 (age 70); Spokane, Washington
- Education: Washington State University (BA, MS)
- Occupations: CEO and Co-Founder, North by Northwest Productions; Politician
- Political party: Democratic
- Website: Campaign Website

Rich Cowan (born February 7, 1956) was the 2012 Democratic nominee for the U.S. House of Representatives in Washington's 5th congressional district. He is also an American film producer, director, and screenwriter. He co-founded North by Northwest Productions, a video and film production company based in Spokane, Washington. After starting the company in 1990 with a group of partners, he served as its CEO for 22 years, launching the movie industry in the Inland Northwest and producing more than 40 feature films.

== Early life and education ==
Rich Cowan was born in Spokane, Washington to George and Betty Cowan. His father served in the United States Air Force, and his mother was a school teacher. He attended Washington State University in Pullman, Washington, earning a Bachelor of Arts degree in Broadcast Journalism, cum laude, and a Master of Science degree in Human Nutrition. While in Pullman, Cowan worked as a fire fighter and emergency medical technician, living in the firehouse for six years. Cowan earned his pilot's license in high school and worked as a pilot in Alaska while in college.

== Television career ==
Cowan's career in media began in 1979 at Spokane television station KHQ-TV, the local NBC affiliate, on its PM Magazine show. He eventually became the station's Community Affairs Director. In 1989 Cowan produced the TV documentary about then-Congressman and House Majority Leader Tom Foley, titled "The Gentleman from Washington." Cowan spent a week with Congressman Foley taping the video and gathering interviews with colleagues such as House Minority Leader Robert Michel, Rep. Leon Panetta and Senator Dan Evans. Cowan won two Emmy awards from the Northwest Chapter of the National Association of Television Arts & Sciences while with KHQ.

== North by Northwest Productions ==
Cowan co-founded the video and film production company North by Northwest Productions in 1990. The company originally specialized in commercial and industrial video production, but quickly began expanding its business. The company now contains five separate divisions as well as a studio in Boise, Idaho. In 1995, North by Northwest produced its first feature-length film. Following on that success, the company produced its first breakout movie, "The Basket," in 1999. Cowan directed, produced, and co-wrote the feature which won several awards, including Best of the Fest Family/Children from the Breckenridge Festival of Film, Directors Gold Medal Award from the International Family Film Festival, and Best Family Movie of the Year from the Movie Guide Awards. He has since been involved with over 40 additional feature film projects, including producer credits on Lies and illusions, Norman, and Camilla Dickinson.

== Political career ==
In February 2012, Cowan announced his candidacy for Washington State's 5th Congressional District. In May, he received the official nomination of the Washington State Democratic Party to run for that seat. He ran against incumbent U.S. Representative Cathy McMorris Rodgers, a Republican. McMorris Rodgers had been serving as the U.S. representative for the 5th district since 2005. In the primary, Cowan received 35.65% of the vote, enough to beat out two other primary contenders and face McMorris Rodgers in the general election. Cowan lost in the general, receiving 38.08% of the vote to McMorris Rodgers' 61.92%.

In 2014, Cowan ran against incumbent state senator Michael Baumgartner for Washington's 6th Legislative District senate seat. In the primary, Cowan received 42.69% of the primary vote and moved on to face Baumgartner in the general election. Cowan lost in the general, receiving roughly 43% of the vote to Baumgartner's 57%.

== Filmography ==
Director

- The Basket (1999) (Also writer)
- Shadow of Fear (2004)
- The River Murders (2011)

Editor

- Hard Vice (1994)
- Laws of Deception (1997)
- Matter of Trust (1998)
- The Basket (1999)

Producer

- Navajo Blues (1996)
- The Basket (1999)
- Whacked! (2002)
- Hangman's Curse (2003)
- The Making of the Passion of the Christ (2004) (Also writer)
- The Spider Wrangler: The Spiders of Hangman's Curse (2004)
- Frank Peretti: From Page to Screen (2004)
- The Choke (2006)
- A Thousand Years of Good Prayers (2007)
- The Family Holiday (2007)
- Lies & Illusions (2009)
- Wrong Turn at Tahoe (2009)
- Norman (2010)
- Oy Vey! My Son Is Gay!! (2010)
- Late Autumn (2010)
- The River Murders (2011)
- Thunderballs (2011)
- The Hit List (2011)

Executive producer

- Mel (1998)
- Jazz Seen: The Life and Times of William Claxton (2001)
- The Choke (2006)
- Frank (2007)
- Give 'Em Hell, Malone (2009)
- Falling Up (2009)
- The Ward (2010)
- The Big Bang (2010)
- Camilla Dickinson (2012)
- Knights of Badassdom (2012)

Executive in charge of production

- Mozart and the Whale (2005)
- The Cutter (2005)
- End Game (2006)

Unit production manager

- Navajo Blues (1996)
- The Giving Tree (2000)
- Wrong Turn at Tahoe (2009)
- Give 'Em Hell, Malone (2009)
- The Ward (2010)
- The Big Bang (2011)

Other credits

Year	Title	Notes
1996	Navajo Blues	Supervising Producer, North by Northwest
1998	Mel	Post-Production Supervisor
2000	The Giving Tree	Production Coordinator
2003	The Big Empty	Line Producer
2006	Home of the Brave	Production Executive
2007	A Thousand Years of Good Prayers	First Assistant Director
2008	Dog Gone	Co-Producer
2011	The Hit List	Actor (Uncredited)
