= Veritas Project =

Christian science fiction series of books by Frank E. Peretti

The Veritas Project is a Christian science fiction series of books written by Frank E. Peretti and targeted towards teenagers.

== Overview ==
The series presents the Veritas Project as a privately funded team commissioned by the President to investigate supernatural occurrences, mysteries, and crimes from a Judeo-Christian perspective. The team consists of Nate and Sarah Springfield and their sixteen-year-old twins Elijah and Elisha. Their mission is to report not only the facts related to their cases, but also the truth behind the facts. Veritas in Latin means "truth".

== Books ==
As of March 2026, the two entries in the series are Hangman's Curse (2001) and Nightmare Academy (2002).

The first book Hangman's Curse focuses on a high school whose students are stricken by the alleged curse of the school's ghost. The Springfields are sent on a covert mission to uncover the truth behind the events.

In the second novel Nightmare Academy Elijah and Elisha investigate a mysterious school that appears to be connected to the disappearances of runaway teenagers.
