= Hangman's Curse (film) =

2003 film by Rafal Zielinski

- Directed by: Rafal Zielinski
- Screenplay by: Kathy Mackel; Stan Foster
- Based on: Hangman's Curse by Frank Peretti
- Produced by: Jerry Rose; Rich Cowan; Ralph Winter; Joe Goodman; Bobby Neutz; Frank Peretti; Steve Buhai; Kelly Neutz
- Starring: David Keith; Mel Harris; Leighton Meester; Douglas Smith; Frank Peretti; Daniel Farber; William R. Moses
- Cinematography: Dan Heigh
- Edited by: Mary Morrisey; Tiffany Wallach
- Music by: David Bergeaud
- Production companies: Total Living Network; Namesake Entertainment; North by Northwest Productions
- Distributed by: 20th Century Fox
- Release date: September 12, 2003 (United States)
- Running time: 106 minutes
- Country: United States
- Language: English
- Budget: $2 million
- Box office: $168,406

Hangman's Curse is a 2003 American horror thriller film directed by Rafal Zielinski, based on the 2001 Christian novel of the same name by Frank Peretti. The film stars David Keith, Mel Harris, Leighton Meester, and Douglas Smith, with a cameo by novelist and Northwest native Peretti. The filming took place in Spokane, Washington, with interior and exterior shots of John R. Rogers High School. Additional exterior shots were filmed at nearby Riverside State Park, as well as Winnipeg, Manitoba, Canada.

== Plot ==
The film is set at John R. Rogers High School in Spokane, Washington. Ten years prior, student Abel Frye, a victim of bullying, had committed suicide by hanging himself on the school property. Fast-forward to the current day, when several student football players (who are also school bullies) are mysteriously becoming gravely ill. Just before falling into a coma, each victim is heard screaming the spirit's name, Abel Frye. In an effort to get to the bottom of the haunting, the school turns for help to the Veritas Project, a team of highly trained investigators who work undercover to unravel the truth about paranormal activities. The Veritas Project consists of the members of the Springfield family, including father Nate, mother Sarah, daughter Elisha, and son Elijah.

The high-school students in the film represent various social classes or youth subcultures, including jocks, geeks, and goths. Prominent among the students in the film are members of the goth culture, who worship the ghost of Abel Frye. The goth students are led by Ian Snyder. Unbeknownst to the rest of the school, Norman Bloom, a young geek Elisha befriended, is Frye's nephew. In retaliation for the bullying and mistreatment inflicted on the different students, Bloom exacts revenge on the popular football players.

Bloom's plan includes gaining access to the locker of each targeted bully and placing a deadly male spider, trapped in a straw, inside the locker. Bloom then gives the bully tainted money, upon which he has secretly placed trace amounts of female spider pheromones. When the unsuspecting bully reaches into his locker, the waiting male spider is easily attracted to the pheromones, and then crawls out and bites the student. Among the effects of the toxin, the affected students experience hallucinations, believing that the ghost of Abel Frye is after them.

At one point, Bloom accidentally puts an additional female spider in one of the straws, which results in thousands of deadly spiders overtaking the school. Elisha Springfield, attending the school undercover as a student, eventually figures out the mystery and the diabolical plot designed by Norman Bloom. In fear of being discovered, Bloom attempts to keep his involvement in the haunting hidden by poisoning both himself and Elisha with a spider, hoping that they will both die. When Elijah figures out that Bloom is behind the sinister attacks in the school, he races to find his sister, and the Springfield family rush to professor and scientist Dr. Algernon Wheeling, who saves Elisha with an antivenom. In the end, the students at Rogers High School are protected not only from haunting and harm from others but from the harm brought on by their own hatred and fear as well.

== Cast ==
- David Keith as Nate Springfield
- Mel Harris as Sarah Springfield
- Leighton Meester as Elisha Springfield
- Douglas Smith as Elijah Springfield
- Jake Richardson as Ian Snyder
- Bobby Brewer as Leonard Baynes
- Daniel Farber as Norman Bloom
- Edwin Hodge as Blake Hornsby
- Andrea Morris as Crystal Sparks
- William R. Moses as Coach Marquardt
- Margaret Travolta as Debi Wyrthen
- Tom Wright as Dan Carillo
- Frank Peretti as Dr. Algernon Wheeling

== Reception ==
Hangman's Curse received universally negative reviews. On the review aggregator website Rotten Tomatoes, the film holds an approval rating of 0% based on 6 reviews, with an average rating of 2.9/10. Some Christian reviewers were more lenient, with Christian Spotlight on Entertainment giving the film three out of five stars.
