= Hangman's Curse =

Book by Frank Peretti

- First edition
- Author: Frank E. Peretti
- Language: English
- Series: Veritas Project
- Genre: Mystery, Young adult, horror
- Publisher: Thomas Nelson
- Publication date: January 29, 2001
- Publication place: United States
- Media type: Print (Hardcover)
- Pages: 304
- ISBN: 978-0-8499-7616-2
- OCLC: 44914184
- LC Class: PZ7.P4254 Han 2001
- Followed by: Nightmare Academy

Hangman's Curse is a 2001 novel by Frank E. Peretti. It is the first book in the Veritas Project series for teenagers.

== Plot overview ==
The story centers around an apparently supernatural case taken by a family of investigators who make up the Veritas Project. Seventy years after the suicidal hanging of Abel Frye, a bullied student, Jocks from the school's football team begin to lose their sanity after seeing what they believe to be Abel's ghost, which is rumored to be under the control of a group of witches out for revenge. Abel's ghost makes them go into a coma-like state.

== Plot summary ==
In Baker, Washington, high school quarterback Jim Boltz becomes insane during a match and hallucinates a ghost coming after him – Abel Frye. The Veritas Project, a Christian investigation team consisting of the Springfield family: Patriarch Nate, wife Sarah, and twin children Elijah and Elisha, are sent to Baker to investigate the case. Elijah and Elisha enroll as students while Nate poses as a janitor.

Nate learns that three football players have been attacked by Abel Frye – which rendered them mad before inexplicably leading to coma – after finding a hangman symbol on their lockers. According to legend, a student named Abel Frye hanged himself in school grounds in the 1930s and has haunted his last spot ever since: the Forbidden Hallway. However, Sarah learns from the school librarian that there is no record of an Abel Frye ever studying in Baker. Though there was a student who hanged himself. When Leonard Baynes picks on Ian Snyder, a rumored “witch”, Elijah steps in to stop him. Meanwhile, Nate finds a straw with unknown substances in one of the victim’s locker. That night, the twins sleep in the Forbidden Hallway while attempting to record any supernatural activity.

Elisha befriends a smart student named Norman Bloom after he backs her disapproval of the Miller experiment in class. That same day, Elijah and Ian are grounded after classes following an argument with a teacher. Leonard is attacked by Abel Frye after Sarah hears his name echoing in the recording made last night. The family revisits the school at night, and hear another name being chanted. Discovering a secret entrance to the school’s old basement, Elijah and Elisha find a small altar to Abel recently visited, but decide to leave everything as is.

Cheerleader Shawna Miller is questioned after a hangman symbol is discovered on her locker, and she suggests Abel Frye is controlled by Crystal Sparks, another rumored witch. Nonetheless, when interrogated, Crystal responses are cryptic and allude to Abel Frye acting on his own. Elisha witnesses Norman being bullied by jocks and discovers he had been bribing them to leave him alone. Meanwhile, Elijah convinces Ian to exercise with him but both are driven out of the school gym by the same jocks, whose bullying is condoned by the football coach, Mr. Marquadt.

Shifting through Leonard’s belongings, Nate finds another straw with the same substances. Elijah sits with Ian during lunch after the latter mentioned he could do “something” to Marquadt. Ian claims to control Abel, however, when cheerleader Amy Warren suddenly becomes mad after seeing Abel Frye, Ian becomes disheartened and runs away. Sarah reveals that the unknown chemical compounds were sugar and paint additive, then they learn that both Amy and Crystal are now dead. Elijah rendezvous with Ian, where he proclaims to be a witch and have used Abel Frye to take revenge on bullies. Yet, Ian never sent Abel after Amy or Crystal. Before leaving, Ian reveals that there was someone who survived his “curse” and the Springfields deduce that it’s Blake Hornsby, another jock. Upon exploring Blake’s forgotten locker, Nate finds another straw.

With help from entomologist Algernon Wheeling, Sarah discovers that the straws where used as vehicle for male wolf spiders. The culprit would place the spider inside the straw with sugar blocking both sides and smear the victim with female pheromones to direct the spider to them. When Wheeling realizes that the wolf spiders have crossbred with local brown recluse spiders, he warns Sarah that the hybrid is deadlier. By then, Elisha has discovered an old shaft that goes behind the victims lockers, but becomes trapped inside it while searching for Norman, who volunteered to help her.

The school is evacuated when it becomes swarmed by hybrid spiders, driven crazy by the pheromones in everyone’s dollar bills. Elisha crawls through the old shaft while covered in spiders. Finding Norman in a secret room, he reveals himself as the culprit: He brought the wolf spiders from Africa after a trip and used them to enact revenge on his bullies, dousing their straws with additive to shorten their lifespan, still, he committed the mistake of releasing a female. Amy and Crystal were bit by the hybrid, which caused their deaths. Norman also discloses that he created the legend and manipulated other ostracized students to cover his tracks.

Norman leaves Elisha to her fate but returns after being encouraged by a teacher, using male pheromones to drive the spiders away from him and carry her to safety. Following her recovery, Elisha learns that the other victims have begun recovering after having an antidote administered, while both Norman and Ian have been entered into a mentorship to turn their lives around.

== Reception ==
Publishers Weekly referred to Hangman's Curse as "a quick-paced thriller about the evils brought by bullying and intolerance". They also found that "Peretti paints a realistic picture of the clique-y world of high school" and that "his comfortably paced, compelling performance consistently draws readers along". Considering Peretti's background in Christian fiction, they noted that he "has an obvious knack [...] for emphasizing his beliefs without preaching."

Elaine Fort Weischedel, writing for School Library Journal, described Peretti's Veritas Project as "an evangelical Christian X-Files". While noting that "the members of the Springfield family do not keep their religious life undercover", Fort Weischedel found that the religious aspects of the story do "not interrupt the flow of the story, nor does anyone get preachy".

Beyond the religious aspects of the novel, Fort Weischedel noted that "Peretti develops the plot nicely" and concluded that "young teens should enjoy this fast-paced and atmospheric novel".

== Film adaptation ==
Hangman's Curse, a film based on the novel, was released in 2003. It stars David Keith as Nate, Mel Harris as Sarah, Leighton Meester as Elisha, and Douglas Smith as Elijah. The movie was filmed largely at John R. Rogers High School in Spokane, Washington. The movie differed greatly from the book, leaving out key scenes and turning the character of Crystal into a main character as Ian Snyder's girlfriend.
