= Eric Dane =

American actor (1972–2026)

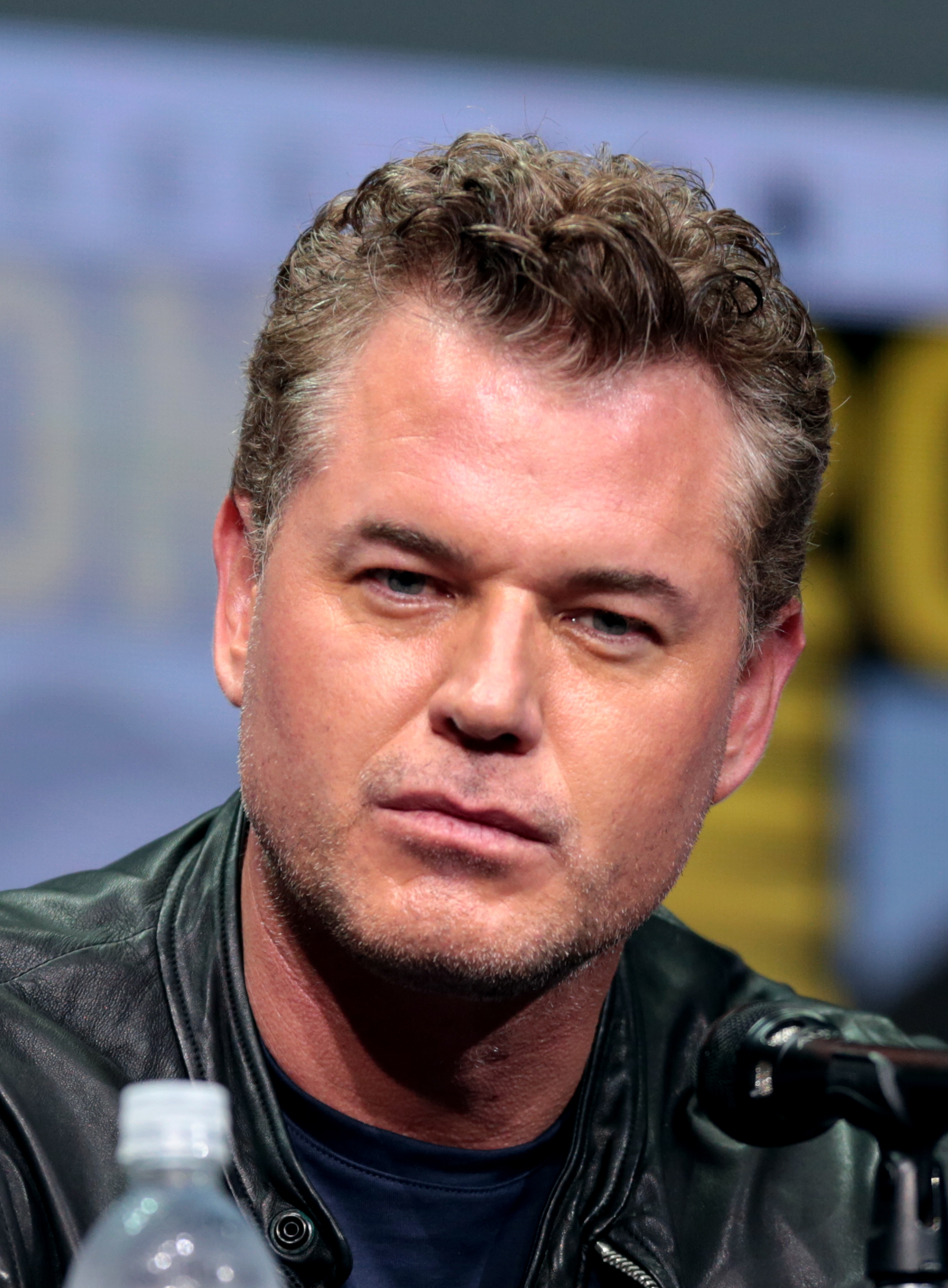
- Dane at the 2017 San Diego Comic-Con
- Born: Eric William Melvin Dane; November 9, 1972; San Francisco, California, U.S.
- Died: February 19, 2026 (aged 53); Los Angeles, California, U.S.
- Occupation: Actor
- Years active: 1991–2026
- Spouse: Rebecca Gayheart (m. 2004)
- Children: 2

Eric William Melvin Dane (November 9, 1972 – February 19, 2026) was an American actor. After multiple television roles in the 1990s and 2000s, including his recurring role as Jason Dean on Charmed, he was cast as Dr. Mark Sloan on the ABC medical drama Grey's Anatomy (2006–2012; 2021). He went on to appear in films such as X-Men: The Last Stand (2006) as Multiple Man, Marley & Me (2008), Valentine's Day (2010), Burlesque (2010), and Bad Boys: Ride or Die (2024).

Dane also played Captain Tom Chandler in the TNT series The Last Ship (2014–2018), Cal Jacobs in the HBO drama series Euphoria (2019–2026), and FBI Special Agent Nathan Blythe in the Amazon Prime Video crime series Countdown (2025). In 2025, he announced that he had been diagnosed with amyotrophic lateral sclerosis (ALS), which led to his death in 2026 at the age of 53.

== Early life ==
Eric William Melvin was born on November 9, 1972, in San Francisco, California. He had a younger brother. They were raised in their mother's Jewish faith, and Dane had a bar mitzvah ceremony. When he was seven, his father died of a self-inflicted gunshot wound. Dane was an athlete in high school, playing on the boys' varsity water polo team. He decided to pursue acting after appearing in a school production of Arthur Miller's All My Sons.

== Career ==
In 1993, Dane moved to Los Angeles, where he played small roles in the television series Saved by the Bell, The Wonder Years, Roseanne, and Married... with Children, among others. In 2000, he was cast in a recurring role on Gideon's Crossing, followed by a two-season run as Jason Dean on Charmed. His made-for-television film credits included two biopics, Serving in Silence (1995), about Margarethe Cammermeyer's experiences in the military, and Helter Skelter (2004), in which he portrayed Charles "Tex" Watson of the Manson family.

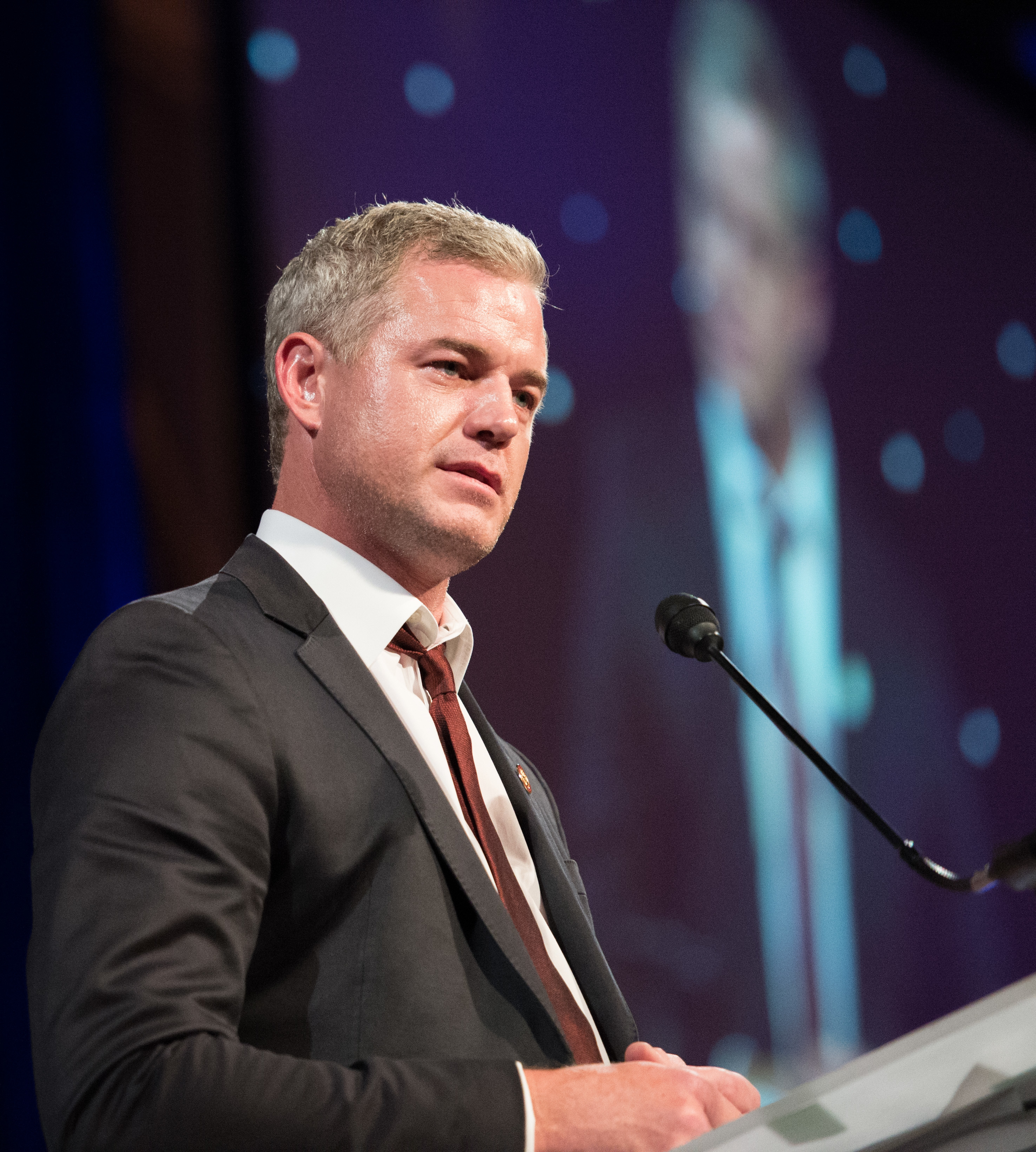
Dane speaking in March 2015

Dane's first major feature film appearance was in The Basket. He also appeared in Zoe, Duncan, Jack & Jane, Sol Goode, Feast, X-Men: The Last Stand, and starred in Open Water 2. In 2005, he guest-starred as Dr. Mark Sloan in "Yesterday", the eighteenth episode of the second season of the ABC medical drama Grey's Anatomy. Positive audience reaction to the character led to his becoming a series regular in the third season. His first appearance that season—in which he walked out of a bathroom soaking wet and wearing only a strategically placed towel—was described as a "watercooler moment". Dane left the series after the end of season 8 but appeared in the first two episodes of season 9. In 2021, he returned to the show for the first time in nine years, despite his character having been killed off.

In December 2006, he starred in the A&E television film Wedding Wars as the brother of a gay man (played by John Stamos) who goes on strike in support of same-sex marriage. Dane, alongside Grey's Anatomy co-star Patrick Dempsey, appeared in the 2010 romantic comedy Valentine's Day, directed by Garry Marshall, which followed five interconnecting stories about Los Angeles residents anticipating—or dreading—the holiday.

In October 2012, Dane joined the main cast of the Michael Bay–produced TNT drama series The Last Ship. He starred as Tom Chandler, and the series ran from 2014 to 2018.

In 2017, Dane starred in the feature film Grey Lady. His wife, Rebecca Gayheart, also appeared in the film.

Dane later starred as Cal Jacobs in Euphoria, which premiered in 2019. In 2023, he discussed the challenges of performing scenes that required him to wear a prosthetic penis, describing them as "very difficult to shoot".

== Personal life ==
Dane married actress Rebecca Gayheart on October 29, 2004. They had two daughters. In February 2018, Gayheart filed for divorce after 14 years of marriage, citing "irreconcilable differences". On March 7, 2025, she reportedly filed to dismiss the divorce petition after seven years of separation. After their separation, Dane was in a relationship with Priya Jain for several years and at the time of his death was in a relationship with Janell Shirtcliff.

In 2009, a video in which Dane, Gayheart, and Kari Ann Peniche appear nude and using drugs was released on Gawker.

In June 2011, Dane entered a California treatment center to recover from a dependency on prescription drugs that he developed after an injury.

In April 2017, production on The Last Ship halted through Memorial Day because Dane was suffering from depression.

=== Illness and death ===
In April 2025, Dane announced that he had been diagnosed with amyotrophic lateral sclerosis (ALS). He said his symptoms had begun roughly eighteen months earlier. By June 2025, he could no longer use his right arm. By October 2025, he was using a wheelchair. He eventually died on February 19, 2026, at the age of 53 from respiratory failure related to ALS.

The day after his death, Dane's final televised interview was released as part of the Netflix series Famous Last Words, which he had recorded three months earlier.

== Filmography ==
Key
†	Denotes films that have not yet been released

=== Film ===
Year	Title	Role	Notes	Ref.
2000	The Basket	Tom Emery	Film debut	
2003	Sol Goode	Overly Dramatic Actor		
2005	Feast	Hero		
2006	X-Men: The Last Stand	Jamie Madrox / Multiple Man		
2006	Open Water 2: Adrift	Dan		
2008	Marley & Me	Sebastian Tunney		
2010	Valentine's Day	Sean Jackson		
2010	Burlesque	Marcus Gerber		
2015	Grey Lady	Detective James Doyle	Direct-to-video film	
2021	The Ravine	Mitch Bianci		
2022	Redeeming Love	Duke		
2022	American Carnage	Eddie		
2023	Little Dixie	Governor Richard Jeffs		
2023	Americana	Dillon MacIntosh		
2023	Dangerous Waters	Derek Stipes		
2024	Bad Boys: Ride or Die	James McGrath		
2024	One Fast Move	Dean Miller		
2025	Borderline	Bell		
TBA	Family Secrets †	TBA	Post-production; posthumous release	

=== Television ===
Year	Title	Role	Notes	Ref.
1991	Saved by the Bell	Tad Pogue	Episode: "The Game"	
1992	Renegade	Jimmy Warren	Episode: "Mother Courage"	
1993	The Wonder Years	Brett	Episode: "Nose"	
1995	Serving in Silence: The Margarethe Cammermeyer Story	Matt	Television film	
1995	Married... with Children	Oliver Cole	Episode: "Radio Free Trumaine"	
1996	Silk Stalkings	Justin Whalen	Episode: "Private Dancer"	
1996	Seduced by Madness	Nick	Television film	
1996	Roseanne	Bellhop	Episode: "Disney World War II"	
1997	Crisis Center	Mark Kelly	Episode: "He Said, She Said"	
2000	Zoe, Duncan, Jack and Jane	Alec	Episode: "Kiss of Death"	
2000–2001	Gideon's Crossing	Dr. Wyatt Cooper	Recurring role; 4 episodes	
2002	The American Embassy	Rob Goodwin	Recurring role; 3 episodes	
2003–2004	Charmed	Jason Dean	Recurring role (seasons 5–6); 9 episodes	
2004	Helter Skelter	Charles "Tex" Watson	Television film	
2004	Las Vegas	Leo Broder	Episodes: "Have You Ever Seen the Rain?" & "The Count of Montecito"	
2005	Painkiller Jane	Nick Pierce	Television film	
2006	Wedding Wars	Ben Grandy	Television film	
2006–2012, 2021	Grey's Anatomy	Dr. Mark Sloan	Guest star (season 2), Main role (seasons 3–9), Special guest star (season 17); 139 episodes	
2009–2010	Private Practice	Dr. Mark Sloan	Episodes: "Ex-Life" & "Another Second Chance"	
2014–2018	The Last Ship	Captain Tom Chandler	Main role; 56 episodes	
2015	The Fixer	Carter	Miniseries; 4 episodes	
2018	Family Guy	Himself	Voice role; Episode: "Veteran Guy"	
2019–2026	Euphoria	Cal Jacobs	Main role; 15 episodes, posthumous release (season 3)	
2020	Wireless	Officer T.C. Kirschner	Episode: "100%"	
2025	Countdown	Nathan Blythe	Main role; 13 episodes	
2025	Kabul	Martin	Miniseries; 6 episodes	
2025	Brilliant Minds	Matthew Ramati	Episode: "The Fire Fighter"	
2026	Famous Last Words	Himself	Interviewee; posthumous release	
