= Gerry Lindgren =

American long-distance runner

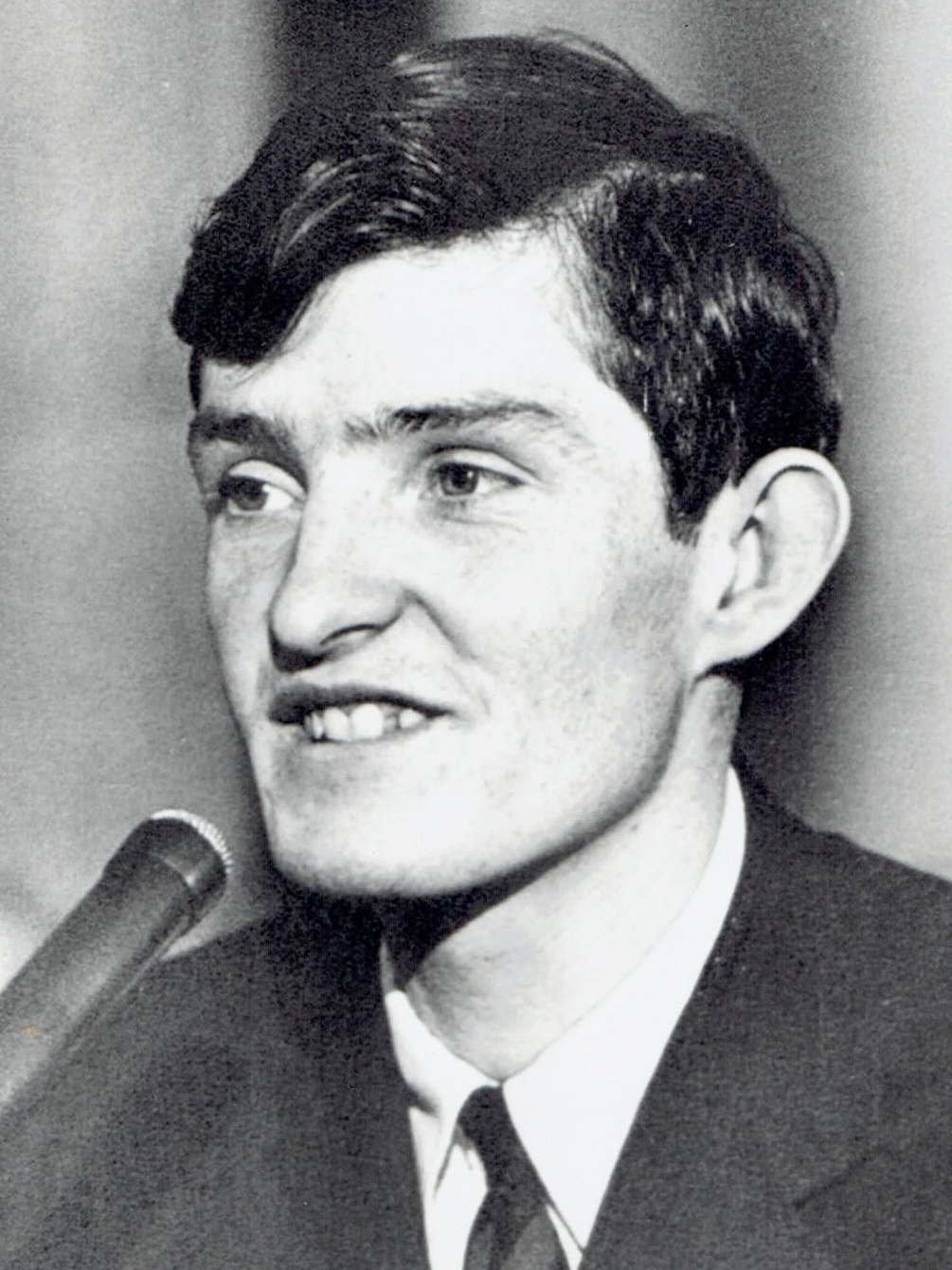
- Lindgren in 1965

Personal information
- Nationality: American
- Born: March 9, 1946 (age 80) Spokane, Washington, U.S.
- Height: 167 cm (5 ft 6 in)
- Weight: 54 kg (119 lb)

Sport
- Sport: Track
- Events: 3000 m, 5000 m, 10,000 m
- College team: Washington State; Rogers High School, Spokane

Achievements and titles
- Personal bests: Mile: 4:01.5; 2-mile indoor: 8:34.0; 3 miles: 12:53.0; 6 miles: 27:11.6^{1} 5000 m – 13:33.8 (1968); 10000 m – 28:40.2 (1967)

Gerald Paul Lindgren (born March 9, 1946) is an American track and field runner who set many long-standing high school and national records in the United States. In 1965, Lindgren and Billy Mills both broke the world record for the six-mile run when they finished in an extremely rare tie at the Amateur Athletic Union (AAU) National Championships, both running exactly 27:11.6. Lindgren went on to win a record 11 NCAA collegiate championships with Washington State University.

== Running career ==
=== High school ===
In 1964, in his senior year at Rogers High School, Lindgren ran 5000 meters in 13 minutes and 44 seconds flat, on a clay track in Compton, California, setting a U.S. high school record for the distance that would remain unbroken for 40 years, until Galen Rupp ran 13:37.91 on July 30, 2004. Among his other records he established that year was his time of 8:40.0 in an indoor 2-mile (3.2 km) race that shattered the previous U.S. national high school mark by an incredible 43 seconds; it was the fastest high school 2-mile (3.2 km) time ever run indoors until February 16, 2013, when Edward Cheserek ran 8:39.15 at the Millrose Games.

Lindgren was coached by Tracy Walters in high school, where Walters was responsible for inspiring Gerry to the heights he reached. In the summer following high school graduation and his historic 13:44 5k, Lindgren ran 200 miles a week for 6 weeks in preparation for the US-USSR meet. After that victory, he also set a new teenage record of 13:17.0 for 3 miles while competing in Jamaica, a meet where he ran his mile best of 4:01.5 as well, both on a dirt track.

On July 25, 1964, Lindgren outran two seasoned Soviet runners, Leonid Ivanov and Anatoly Dutov to win the 10,000 m event in the US-USSR Track Meet in Los Angeles. The event heralded great success for American distance runners in 1964. The ensuing 12 months brought forth 2 gold medals by Americans, in both the 5,000 and 10,000 m events in Tokyo, as well as World Records in the 2-mile, 6-mile and indoor mile. Lindgren was Track and Field News "High School Athlete of the Year" in 1964, and won the 10,000 meter race at the 1964 Olympic Trials.

=== The Summer Olympics and After ===
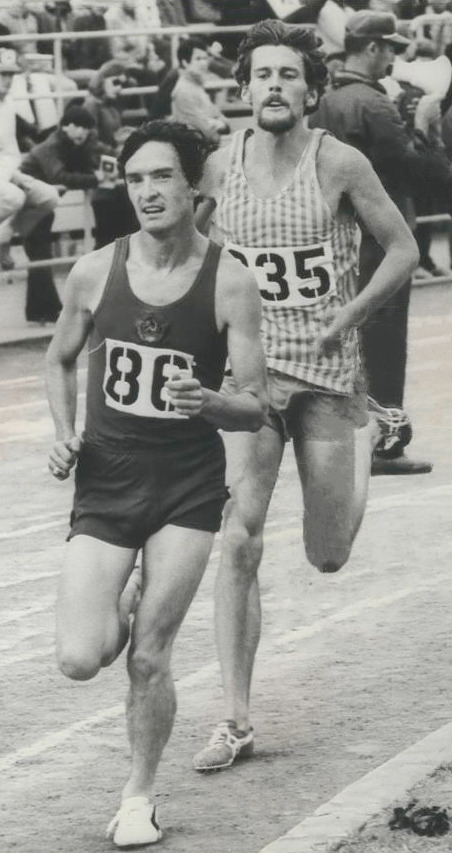
Lindgren (left) in 1971

In the 1964 Summer Olympics in Tokyo, he finished ninth in the 10,000 meters (m) behind gold medalist Billy Mills after having sprained an ankle during training. Four years later, Lindgren tried to make the 1968 Olympic team but finished 5th in the 10,000 m and 4th in the 5,000 m in the Olympic Trials at Echo Summit, just missing the team at both distances. In his training just after college, he was said to have averaged 240 miles per week for one year, including allegedly running a 380-mile week.

Lindgren also competed against Mills in the 1965 AAU Nationals meet, where they raced the 6-mile (9.7 km). Mills won with a diving lean, while both were timed in 27:11.6, a new world record shared by Mills and Lindgren. The mark was also superior to the then world record for 10,000 m of 28:15 held by Ron Clarke. T&F News converted their mark to 28:10. But perhaps Lindgren's greatest race came during a May 1966 NCAA Regional meet at age 20, in the 3-mile run on a dirt track during a cold, windy day in Seattle. He raced to 12:53.0, just missing the world record of 12:52.4 held by Ron Clarke. Both times were superior to the then world record in the 5,000 m of 13:24. T&F News converted his time to 13:21.

=== Collegiate and retirement ===
Lindgren attended Washington State University in Pullman, Washington, where he majored in political science and minored in Russian language. While at Washington State, Lindgren won 11 NCAA Championships. (His only loss at an NCAA championship was to Jim Ryun in the 1968 indoor 2-mile (3.2 km) race.) He was one of only two people to ever defeat Steve Prefontaine in an NCAA Championship. (Lindgren won the 1969 NCAA Cross Country Championship in which 1968 NCAA champion Mike Ryan finished second and Prefontaine third.) He competed sporadically after graduating from college but without any notable success. Since 1980, Lindgren has lived in Honolulu, Hawaii. He continues to run regularly, active in the Hawaii running community. He coached the University of Hawaiʻi's women's track and field team 2005–2007.

== High school personal records ==
- 1500 meters – 3:44.6 (1964)
- 1-mile (1.6 km) – 4:01.5 (1964) (2nd fastest in history in 1964; #8 all time among American high schoolers as of 2011)
- 3000 meters – 8:06.3i (1964) High School Record (4th best of all time as of 2011)
- 2-mile (3.2 km) – 8:40.0i (1964) High School Record (now 2nd all-time indoors)
- 3 miles (4.8 km) – 13:17.0 (1964) (High School Record)
- 5000 meters – 13:44.0 (1964) High School Record (5th All-time American High School time as of 2026)
- 10000 meters – 29:17.6 (1964) High School Record (6th best all time as of 2026)

== College personal records ==
- 3 miles (4.8 km) – 12:53.0 (1966) Collegiate and American Record
- 6 miles (9.7 km) – 27:11.6 (1965) Collegiate and World Record
- 3000 meters – 7:58 (1965) Collegiate and American Record
- 5000 meters – 13:33.8 (1968) Collegiate and American Record
- 10000 meters – 28:40.2 (1967) Collegiate and American Record

== NCAA Championships ==
- Cross Country – 1966 (29:01.4), 1967 (30:45.6), 1969 (28:59.2)
- 3 miles (4.8 km) outdoor track – 1966 (13:33.7), 1967 (13:47.8)
- 5000 m – 1968 (13:47.2)
- 6-mile (9.7 km) outdoor track – 1966 (28:07.0), 1967 (28:44.0)
- 10000 m – 1968 (29:41.0)
- 2 miles (3.2 km) indoor track – 1966 (8:41.3), 1967 (8:34.7)

== Notes ==
- ^1 Lindgren's 6-mile personal record and his 10,000 meter personal record vary to a much larger degree than the lengthwise difference between the two distances (the 10,000 meters is 0.2 miles longer than 6 miles) would indicate. His 6-mile best time of 27:11 would hypothetically convert to just above 28 minutes for 10,000 meters if he continued at a similar pace for an extra 321 meters. However, he never ran faster than 28:40 in the 10,000m, as the 10,000m was not raced as often in the United States as the 6-mile was during the time Lindgren competed. Similar circumstances surround his 3-mile and 5000m pr differences.

Awards
Preceded by Randy Matson	Track & Field News High School Boys Athlete of the Year; 1964	Succeeded by Jim Ryun
