= Brian Skala =

American actor

- Born: March 29, 1981 (age 45); Boulder, Colorado, U.S.
- Other name: Brian T. Skala
- Occupation: Actor
- Years active: 1999–present

Brian T. Skala (born March 29, 1981) is an American actor. He is known for playing the lead role, Dylan Roberts, on the NBC series Just Deal. He has guest starred on Boston Public, JAG, Without a Trace, Gilmore Girls, Supernatural, Heroes and FlashForward. He also co-starred in the film The Basket (1999) opposite Peter Coyote and Karen Allen and The Challenge with Mary-Kate and Ashley Olsen.

== Filmography ==
Film and television
Year	Title	Role	Notes
1999	Party of Five	Salerno	TV series, episode: "Witness for the Persecution"
1999	The Basket	Nathan Emery	Independent film
1999	Undressed	Gabe	TV series, series 3
2000–2002	Just Deal	Dylan Roberts	TV series, lead role, 39 episodes
2003	Boston Public	Kyle	TV series, episode: "Chapter Fifty-Eight"
2003	The Challenge	Marcus	Direct-to-video film
2003	Gilmore Girls	Dean's Friend #2	TV series, episode: "Chicken or Beef?"
2004	The Men's Room	Michael	TV series, episodes: "Money for Something", "Sports" and "The Kid Stays in the Picture"
2004	JAG	Lance Corporal Walker Evans	TV series, episode: "Coming Home"
2005	Without a Trace	Ryan Barrett	TV series, episode: "4.0"
2005	Supernatural	Rich	TV series, episode: "Hook Man"
2006	Price to Pay	Peter	Lead role, independent film
2008	Heroes	David Sullivan	TV series, episode: "Chapter Twelve Our Father"
2008	Heroes: The Recruit	David Sullivan	TV mini-series, episodes: "Do What We Have to Do" and "It Was Nothing"
2010	FlashForward	Adam Campos	TV series, episode: "Revelation Zero (Part 2)"
2011	NCIS	Navy Ensign David Howard	TV series, episode: "A Man Walks Into a Bar..."
