= Margaret Travolta =

American actress (born 1946)

- Born: Englewood, New Jersey, U.S.
- Occupation: Actress
- Years active: 1993–present
- Relatives: John Travolta (brother); Joey Travolta (brother); Ellen Travolta (sister)

Margaret Travolta is an American actress.

== Early life ==
Margaret Travolta was born in Englewood, New Jersey to an Italian-Irish Family. Her parents were practicing Catholics. The daughter of Salvatore Travolta and Helen Cecilia (née Burke) she was one of six siblings: John, Joey, Ellen, Ann, and Sam. Her father was a former semi-professional football player who became a tire salesman and a partner in a tire company. Her mother was a former actress, director, and singer who appeared in The Sunshine Sisters, a radio vocal group. Later in life, Helen became a high school drama and English teacher. Margaret's father was a second-generation Italian-American, and her mother was Irish-American.

== Career ==
Travolta's credits include performances in films such as Hangman's Curse with David Keith, Catch Me If You Can with Leonardo DiCaprio and Tom Hanks, National Security with Martin Lawrence and Steve Zahn, High Fidelity with John Cusack and Jack Black, and While You Were Sleeping with Sandra Bullock and Bill Pullman. Her television credits include recurring roles on NYPD Blue as Dr. Helen Boyd and on Days of Our Lives as Sister Mary Margaret, as well as guest-starring appearances on shows such as The Drew Carey Show, Strong Medicine, and Early Edition.

== Filmography ==
=== Film ===
Year	Title	Role	Notes
1993	In the Company of Darkness	Dr. Kohanek	TV movie/Film Debut
1995	Losing Isaiah	Sandra Harris	
1995	While You Were Sleeping	Admitting Nurse	
1996	Chain Reaction	Anita Fermi	
1996	Michael	Reporter #1	
1998	Mercury Rising	Autism Expert Nurse	
2000	High Fidelity	Rob's Mom	
2000	Lucky Numbers	Nurse	
2000	Traffic	Economist	
2001	Swordfish	Hostage	
2002	Pumpkin	Vera Whitner	
2002	Catch Me If You Can	Ms. Davenport	
2003	National Security	Judge	
2003	Basic	Nurse #1	
2003	Hangman's Curse	Debi Wyrthen	
2005	Be Cool	Marge	
2005	Guilt	Aunt Nina	
2006	Solace	Nurse Reynolds	
2006	Lonely Hearts	Mineola Female Dispatcher	
2006	Accepted	Academic Counselor	
2007	Wild Hogs	Dana	
2007	Ocean's Thirteen	Bank's Secretary	
2007	Enchanted	Radio Therapist	
2007	Sex and Breakfast	Gale	
2009	Old Dogs	Singing Hostess	
2010	How to Make Love to a Woman	Mrs. Baker	

=== Television ===
Year	Title	Role	Notes
1993	Missing Persons	Unknown Role	1 episode
1998	Cupid	Congressman's Wife	1 episode
1998	Early Edition	High School Principal	1 episode
1999	Turks	Claire Strummond	1 episode
2002	The Drew Carey Show	Mrs. Bishop	1 episode
2003	NYPD Blue	Dr. Helen Boyd	1 episode
2003	The Handler	Secretary	1 episode
2004	Days of Our Lives	Sister Mary Margaret	1 episode
2007	ER	Secretary	1 episode
