= The Basket (film) =

- Directed by: Rich Cowan
- Written by: Don Caron; Rich Cowan; Frank Swoboda; Tessa Swoboda
- Produced by: Rich Cowan
- Starring: Peter Coyote; Karen Allen
- Cinematography: Dan Heigh
- Edited by: Rich Cowan
- Music by: Don Caron
- Production company: North by Northwest Entertainment
- Release date: May 5, 2000
- Running time: 101 minutes
- Country: United States
- Language: English
- Budget: $4 million

The Basket is a 2000 American independent drama film directed by Rich Cowan and starring Peter Coyote and Karen Allen with Eric Dane in his film debut.

== Cast ==
- Peter Coyote as Martin Conlon
- Karen Allen as Bessie Emery
- Robert Karl Burke as Helmut Brink
- Amber Willenborg as Brigitta Brink
- Jock MacDonald as Nicholas Emery
- Eric Dane as Tom Emery
- Brian Skala as Nathan Emery

== Release ==
The film was released on May 5, 2000.

== Reception ==
The film has a 44% rating on Rotten Tomatoes based on eighteen reviews.

Robin Rauzi of the Los Angeles Times gave the film a mixed review, writing that "carries it off(...)But the film doggedly remains an ensemble piece."

Stephen Holden of The New York Times gave the film a positive review and wrote that it "avoids succumbing to the preachiness that is the bane of so many family films, and for a movie like this, that's no small feat."

Walter Addiego of the San Francisco Examiner gave the film a negative review and wrote, "The story is worked out schematically in the style of TV movies and Saturday-afternoon specials, but the sincerity of the filmmakers, the generosity of their message and the overall decent performances make partial amends for the hokiness and shortcomings in the plot and characterizations."

Deborah Young of Variety gave the film a positive review and wrote, "Screenplay follows the straight and narrow, but producer-director Rich Cowan captures the flavor of the time with help from cinematographer Dan Heigh..."
