= Nightmare Academy =

Novel by Frank E. Peretti

- First edition
- Author: Frank Peretti
- Language: English
- Series: Veritas Project
- Genre: Fantasy, Young adult
- Publisher: Thomas Nelson
- Publication date: July 9, 2002
- Publication place: United States
- Media type: Print (Hardcover)
- Pages: 311 p.
- ISBN: 978-0-8499-7617-9
- OCLC: 50237739
- LC Class: PZ7.P4254 Ni 2002
- Preceded by: Hangman's Curse

Nightmare Academy is a 2002 Christian fictional novel by Frank Peretti and the second novel in the Veritas Project series authored by Frank Peretti. The book was one of the ALA's young adult book picks for 2004.

== Plot summary ==
Twin siblings and Veritas Project members Elijah and Elisha Springfield are sent to investigate the last place a boy was seen after that missing boy mysteriously reappears with his mind wiped clean of almost all of his memories. The only two things he can say are "I don't know" and "Nightmare Academy". When the young man dies mysteriously, the Springfield family is tasked with the investigation of what happened to the boy and what exactly the Nightmare Academy is. Elijah and Elisha are sent to Knight-Moore by a fake shelter and discover that sinister happenings abound on the campus, such as campus raids and frequent fights. During the course of the investigation the teens lose contact with their parents and Elijah is taken to a mysterious mansion after someone starts a fight with him. Elijah's sister has to find a way to save her brother without help from her parents before he is murdered or loses all of his memories...

== Reception ==
Teen Reads positively reviewed the book, writing "By the closing chapter, readers will appreciate more fully the value of developing the skill to think critically in every circumstance."
