= Hillyard, Spokane =

Hillyard
- Neighborhood of Spokane
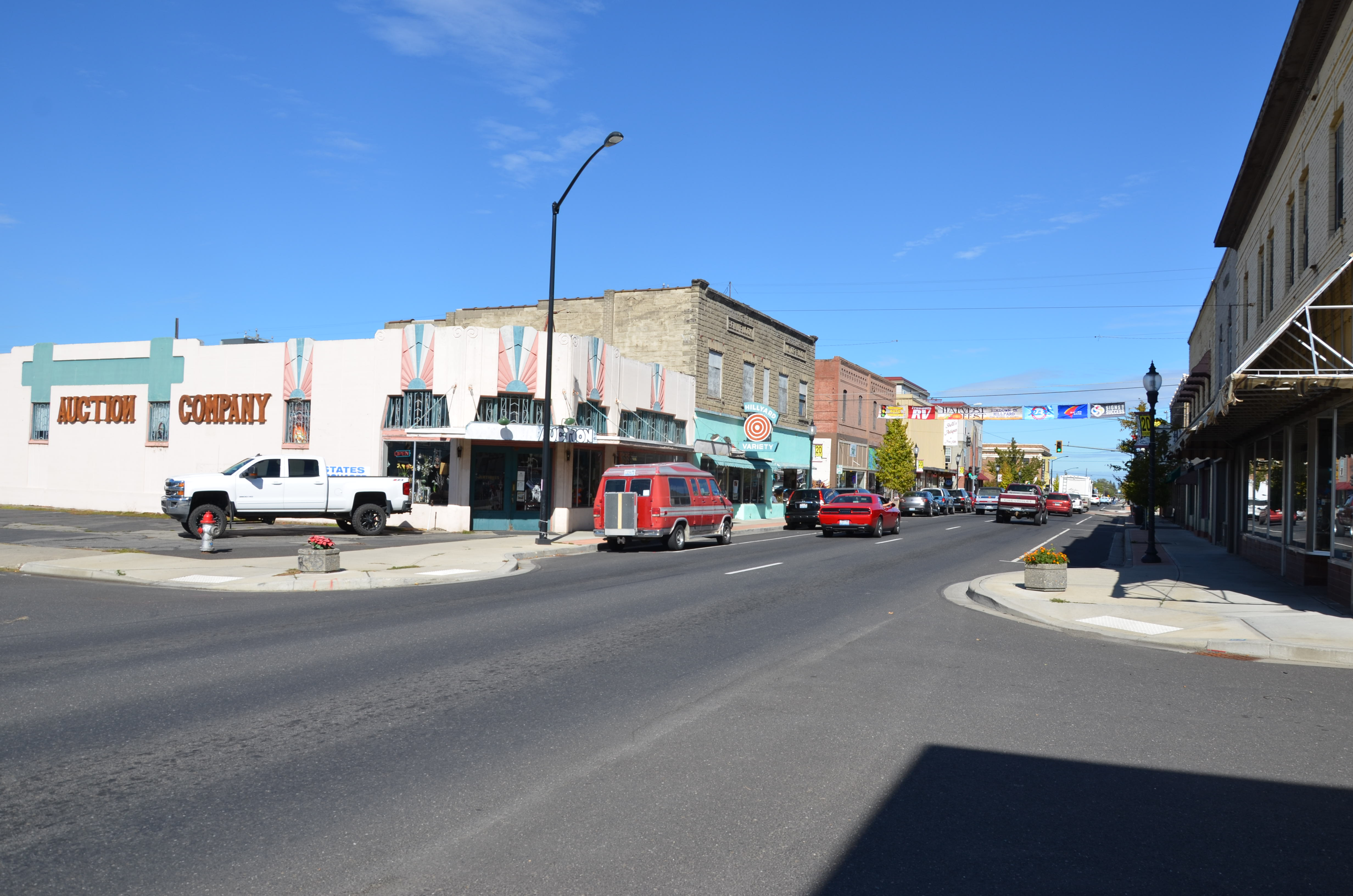
- Hillyard Historic Business District

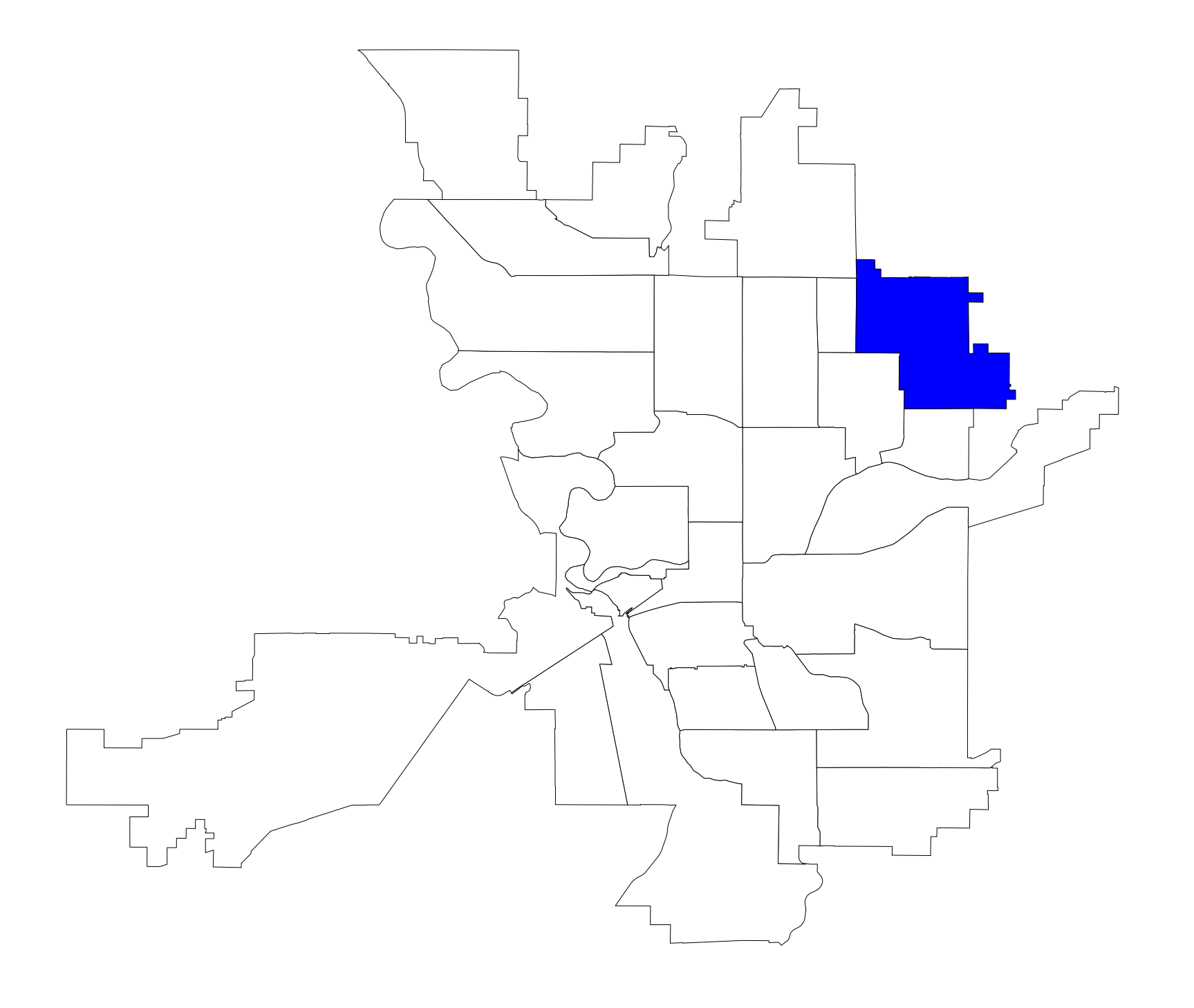
- Location within the city of Spokane
- Coordinates: 47°42′46″N 117°21′07″W
- Country: United States
- State: Washington
- County: Spokane County
- City: Spokane

Population (2017)
  - Total: 6,678
- ZIP codes: 99208, 99217
- Area code: 509

Hillyard is a neighborhood in Spokane, Washington which existed as a separate incorporated city between 1892 and 1924. The city came about due to the Great Northern Railway and was named for James J. Hill, then-head of the railroad. Between 1904 and 1912, many of the city's houses were built to house railroad workers working in the local yard. Hillyard was the home of the Great Northern's famed shops where locomotives were manufactured, repaired, and refurbished. At the time, the Hillyard shop was the largest in the country.

The neighborhood hosts the annual Hillyard Festival in Harmon Park every August.

== History ==
In 1924, Hillyard was officially annexed by neighboring Spokane.

Due to its historical roots as a town housing railroad workers, Hillyard acquired a rather rough reputation, which lasts into recent decades. (As recently as 1979, Daniel Leen described the Hillyard train yards in his book The Freighthoppers Manual for North America as having "the feel of warmed-over death.") After the Great Northern underwent a series of mergers, becoming the Burlington Northern Railroad and eventually the BNSF Railway, the Hillyard yard and shops were closed in the early 1980s with BN's main yard operations in Spokane moving to Yardley. Only the decaying structures of the old shops remain today. Hillyard suffers some of the worst poverty in Spokane, per capita it is the poorest neighborhood in the state of Washington. The eastern border of the neighborhood, east of the railroad tracks, is sometimes affectionately referred to as "Dog Town" by some residents.

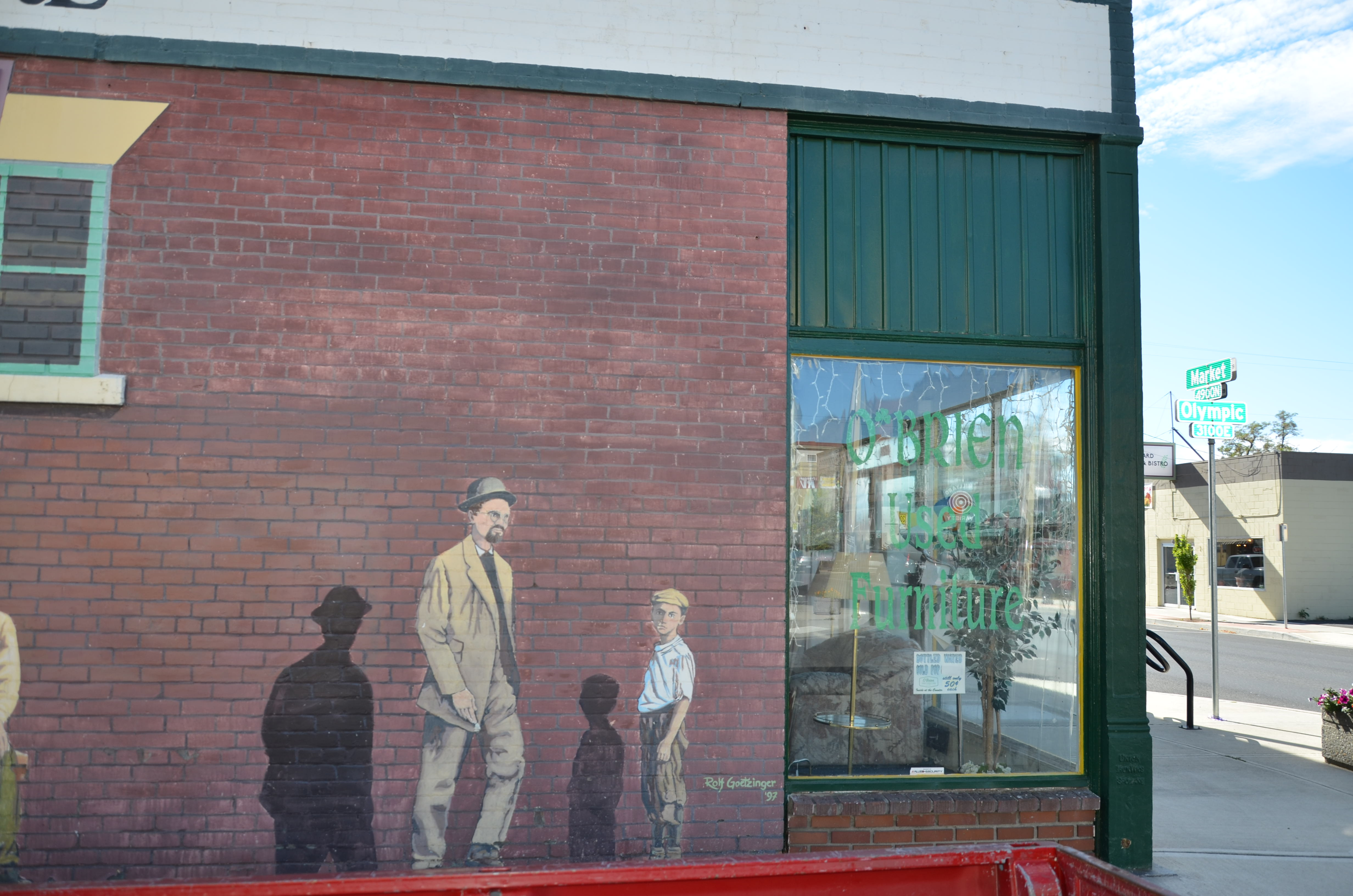
One of the many murals that celebrate the legacy of the railyard in the neighborhood

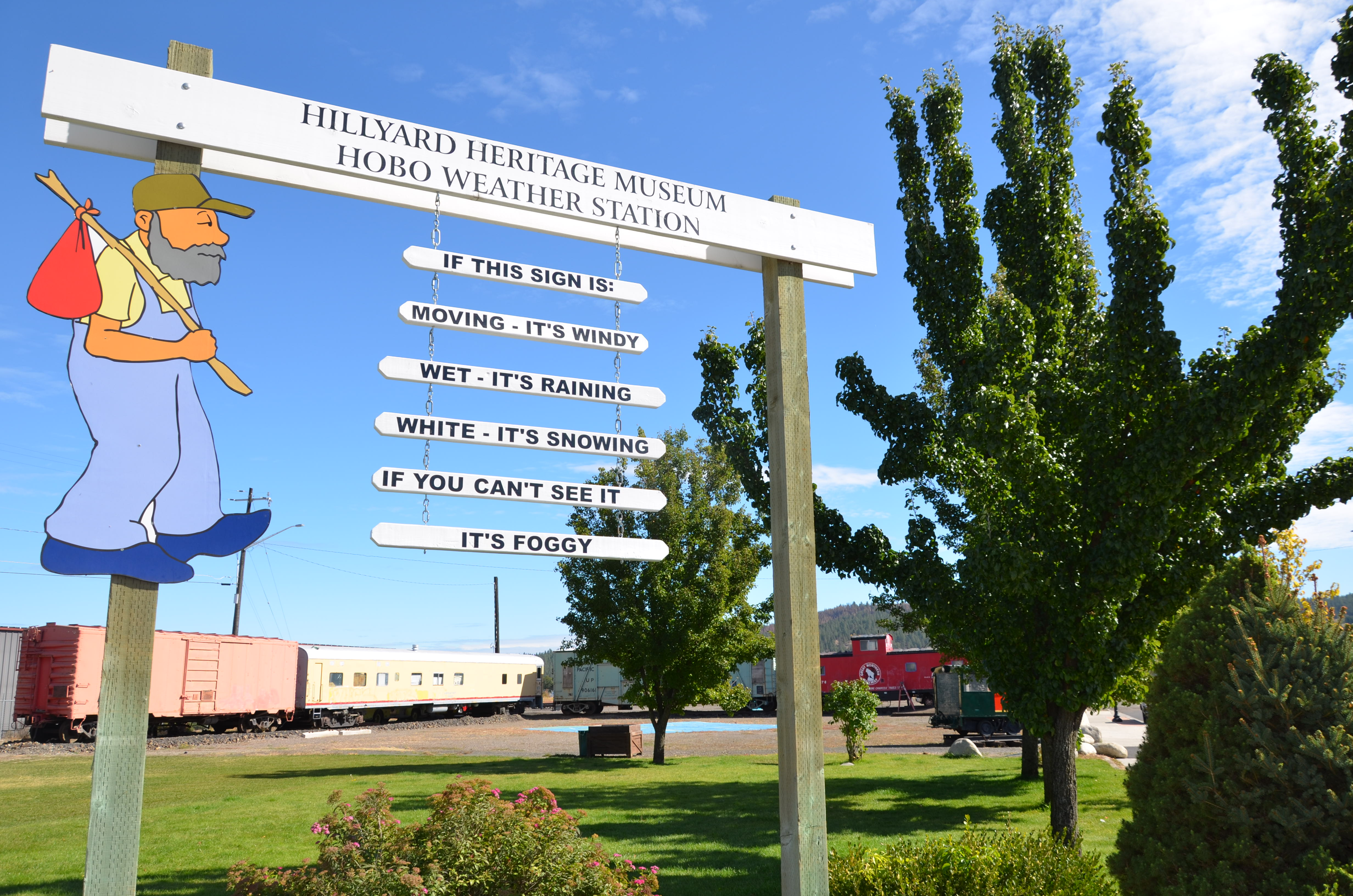
Hillyard Heritage Museum's humorous "Hobo Weather Station"

The preservation of historic buildings is a local concern. According to Teresa Brum, Spokane's Historic Preservation Officer in charge of the project to have Hillyard listed on the National Register: "This is the most architecturally intact neighborhood left in Spokane. Most of it looks as it did 90 years ago." Hillyard neighborhood is still there and is still home to lower income people of Spokane. Murals and a small railroad museum celebrate the town's history. Many of the neighborhood's residents are descended from the railroad workers who started the town, but Hillyard is recently becoming a popular home for immigrants of Russian, Ukrainian, Micronesian, and Southeast Asian descent. The downtown Hillyard business district, located on Market Street, has become Spokane's first neighborhood to be listed in the National Register of Historic Places.

The North Spokane Corridor has forced some relocations in the south end of the neighborhood. It is hoped that the freeway's presence will help revitalize areas of the neighborhood.

== Geography ==
Hillyard is located in the northeastern corner of the city of Spokane. It is bounded on the north and east by the city limits, with Francis Avenue delineating most of the northern border. The eastern border runs along Havana Street north of Wellesley Avenue, south of Wellesley it runs about half a mile to the east of Havana. Crestline Street serves as the western border north of Wellesley. South of Wellesley, the western border runs about half a mile east of Crestline, along the Market/Haven couplet. Wellesley serves as the southern border from Crestline to Haven, and Garnet serves as the southern border east of Haven.

Hillyard proper is part of a grouping of neighborhoods, along with the adjacent Bemiss and Whitman neighborhoods, officially known as Greater Hillyard.

=== Physical Geography ===
Most of the neighborhood is relatively flat, ranging in elevation from 2,000 feet to 2,040 feet, similar to areas in the city lying to the west. In the southeast corner of Hillyard, however, the terrain begins to climb up the slopes of Beacon Hill. The crest of the hill lies just beyond Hillyard, at an elevation of 2,589 feet. Immediately north of Francis Avenue is the semi-rural community of Morgan Acres, an area that was overlooked by homesteaders and developers due to its parched and dry landscape of sand dunes that is unable to retain rainwater. Half a mile to the north of Beacon Hill is Little Baldy, which rises to an even higher 2,664 feet, but its slopes flatten out before reaching into Hillyard proper.

=== Human Geography ===
Hillyard is home to a diverse mix of land uses, including residential, commercial and industrial zones as well as open spaces and parkland. In the northeast there are areas of both heavy and light industrial zones. Residential single family zones dominate in the northwest and southeast areas of the neighborhood. Commercial and retail districts line Market Street and the Market/Haven couplet, with the Hillyard Corridor neighborhood center being located in the former. The Spokane Parks Department manages seven properties in the neighborhood, six neighborhood parks and the Esmeralda Golf Course. Of the six parks, only Harmon Park in the north is larger than one square block.

A three-to-four block wide swath of Hillyard running through the center of the neighborhood north to south is largely vacant, being the former site of the Great Northern rail yard. There yard is gone, though active railroads remain, and the land is heavily polluted with lead and heavy metals. Another largely vacant area exists in the far southeast corner of Hillyard, east of Esmeralda Golf Course, rising along the slopes of Beacon Hill.

== Demographics ==
As of 2017, there were 6,678 residents in the neighborhood across 2,515 households, of which 28.6% had children. 47.4% of households were rented, compared to 45.3% citywide. 27.6% of the residents were aged 19 or younger, compared to 21.9% citywide. Those over 65 made up 10.7% of the population, compared to 14.5% citywide. The median household income was $35,256, compared to $44,768 citywide. 10.6% of the population had a bachelor's degree or higher, while 37.2% had at most a high school diploma. The unemployment rate was 7.3% compared to 6.5% citywide. 76.4% of students qualify for free or reduced lunch, compared to 54.5% citywide.

93.5% of residents were born in the United States or its territories. Of those who weren't, 35.8% were from Ukraine, 14.9% from the Marshall Islands, 11.2% from Vietnam, and 9.5% from Russia.

The race and ethnicity of Hillyard in 2017 was 83% white, 8.1% Hispanic or Latino, 6.3% two or more races, 3.1% American Indian or Alaska Native, 3% Asian, Native Hawaiian or Pacific Islander, and 2.7% Black or African American.

== Education ==
Hillyard is located within the Spokane Public Schools district, like the rest of the city of Spokane. Arlington Elementary is located in the far north of the neighborhood, and it serves Hillyard north of Rowan and west of the rail yard. The bulk of Hillyard is located in the Regal Elementary district, which is located just across Regal Street from Hillyard proper, the adjacent Bemiss neighborhood. Cooper Elementary, located in the Minnehaha neighborhood to the south, serves a small area in the southern reach of Hillyard, next to Esmeralda Golf Course. Cooper and Regal feed into Shaw Middle School, which is located one block from Regal in Bemiss. Arlington feeds into Garry Middle School in the North Hill neighborhood. All three elementary districts are part of the Rogers High School district.

St. Patrick's Catholic School operated in Hillyard for 100 years before closing in 2013 due to dwindling attendance numbers.

== Transportation ==
=== Highway ===
- - (Future) U.S. 395 - to Colville (north) and Spokane (south)

Future U.S. 395 will pass north–south through Hillyard along the North Spokane Corridor, which is expected to be complete by 2029.

=== Surface Streets ===
Aside from the large vacant area in the north central portion of Hillyard, at the site of the former rail yard, almost all of the neighborhood aligns and connects with the city's street grid. Francis and Wellesley Avenues stretch from Hillyard west across the entire north side of the city, and continue east to Orchard Prairie. Both are classified as principal arterials by the city. Market Street and the Market/Haven couplet is classified as a principal arterial as well, connecting Hillyard with Mead to the north and, becoming Greene, Freya, Thor and Ray streets as it goes south, all the way to the southern edge of Spokane. Crestline, Freya, Empire/Garland and Rowan are classified as minor arterials. All other streets in the neighborhood are classified as local access.

For cyclists, dedicated bike lanes run along Crestline and on Francis east of Market. Central and Regal are signed as shared roadway bicycle routes, but do not have dedicated lanes. A shared use, non-motorized pathway planned to parallel the North Spokane Corridor is currently under construction.

=== Public Transit ===
Public transit in Hillyard is provided by the Spokane Transit Authority, which serves the neighborhood with two fixed-route bus lines.

Route	Termini			Service operation and notes	Streets traveled
33; Wellesley	Spokane Community College; SCC Transit Center	↔	Spokane Falls Community College; Spokane Falls Station	High-frequency route	Market/Haven, Wellesley
27; Hillyard	Downtown Spokane; STA Plaza	↔	Balboa/South Indian Trail; Five Mile Park & Ride	Basic-frequency route	Regal, Haven, Market, Rowan, Crestline, Francis
