= John R. Rogers High School =

Public school in Washington, United States

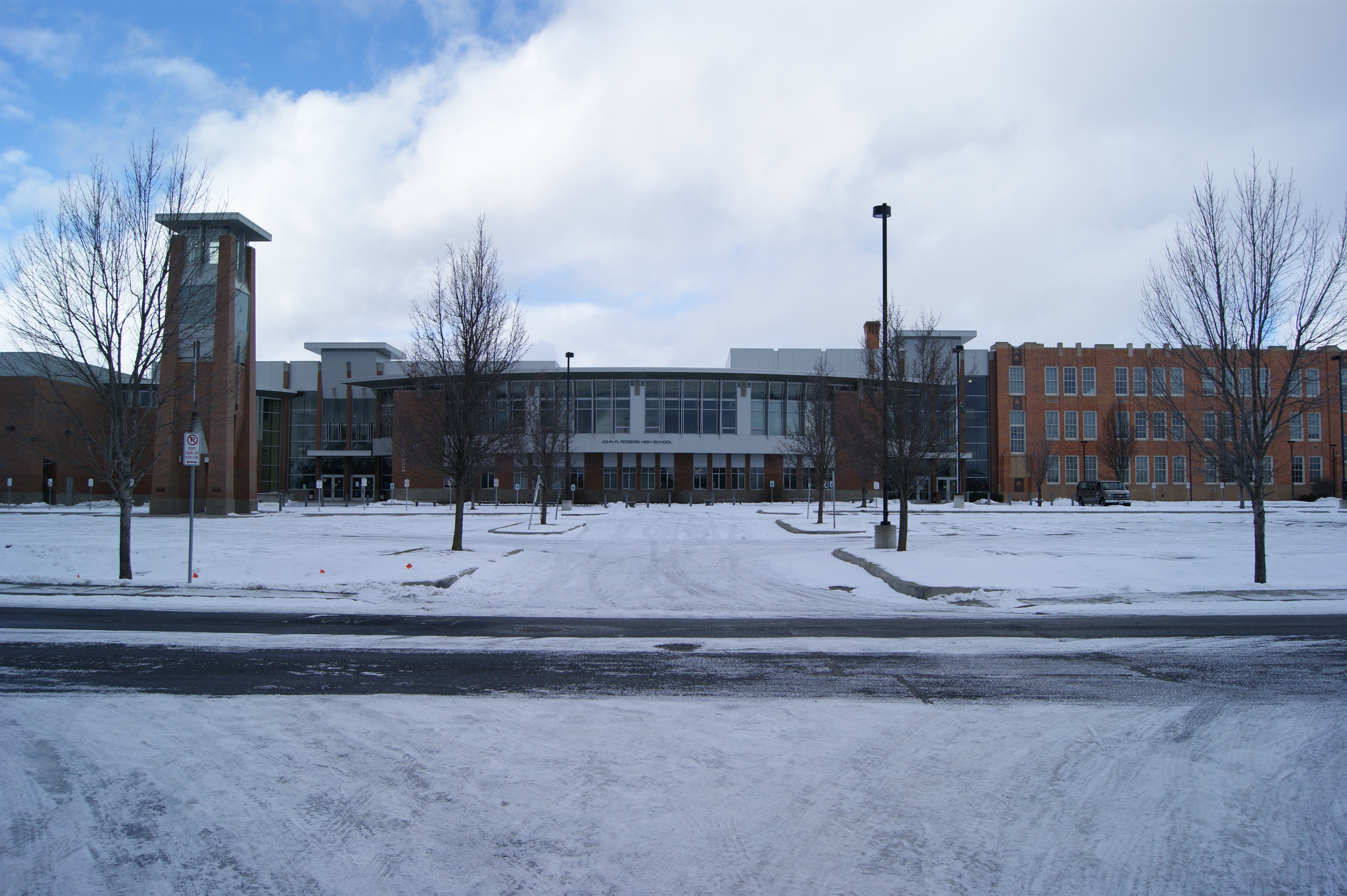
- East entrance on Pittsburg Street

Location
- 1622 East Wellesley Avenue; Spokane, Washington 99207; United States; 47.700°N 117.386°W

Information
- Type: Comprehensive Public High School
- Motto: Familia Sumus (We Are Family)
- Established: March 1, 1932; 94 years ago
- School district: Spokane Public Schools
- Superintendent: Adam Swinyard
- CEEB code: 481260
- NCES School ID: 530825001386
- Principal: John Hammil
- Staff: 94.80 (FTE)
- Grades: 9–12
- Enrollment: 1,511 (2023-2024)
- Student to teacher ratio: 15.94
- Campus size: 25.5 acres (10.3 ha)
- Campus type: Suburban
- Colors: Purple, Gold, Black & White
- Athletics: WIAA Class 2A
- Athletics conference: Greater Spokane League
- Mascot: Pirate
- Newspaper: Rogers Record
- Yearbook: Treasure Chest
- Feeder schools: John Shaw Middle School; Spokane Chief Garry Middle School; Glover Middle School
- Elevation: 2,040 ft (622 m) AMSL
- Website: www.spokaneschools.org/o/rogers
- John R. Rogers High School
- U.S. National Register of Historic Places
- Built: 1932
- Architect: William A. Wells
- Architectural style: Art Deco
- NRHP reference No.: 10001104
- Added to NRHP: January 7, 2011

John R. Rogers High School is a four-year public secondary school in Bemiss, Spokane, Washington, part of Spokane Public Schools (District No. 81). Opened in 1932 in northeast Spokane, the school is named after John Rankin Rogers, the third governor of the State of Washington.

The 90,000-square-foot (8,400 m^{2}) school was listed on the National Register of Historic Places on January 7, 2011. In September 2009, extensive renovation was completed on the school, adding another 170,000 square feet (16,000 m^{2}) to the three-story Art Deco structure.

Two movies have been filmed on location at the school: Vision Quest in 1984, and the thriller Hangman's Curse in 2002. Both movies included hundreds of current and former members of the student body of Rogers High School as extras, as well as former members of the Pirates championship wrestling team, including award-winning coach and social studies teacher, Ken Pelo.

== Location ==
John R. Rogers is located in the Bemiss neighborhood, 3.25 miles (5.2 km) northeast of Downtown Spokane and about 1 mile (1.6 km) east of Northtown Mall and Division Street, the north-south corridor, which separates the city into east and west. While the school is about 2 miles (3 km) southwest of the Hillyard Historic District, it is often associated with the area, due to its close proximity to the former town and the site of the former Hillyard High School.

== History ==
=== Early planning and financing ===
John R. Rogers High School was established in 1932, as the successor to the nearby Hillyard High School. Built in 1907, Hillyard High served a smaller community surrounding James J. Hill's Great Northern Railway train yards. In the late 1920s, Hillyard became overcrowded, making it abundantly clear to the city and the district that there was an urgent need to build a larger, more modern school to accommodate students on the north side of the city.

While the building itself cost $400,000, financed through a hefty bond measure, the combined cost with ground and equipment brought the price tag to $500,000. While the need for a new school was readily apparent throughout Spokane, the approval of a large bond measure, following the recent 1929 stock market crash was considered a shot in the dark. The city overwhelmingly passed the measure. On April 10, 1930, the school board awarded the contract for overseeing the planning and design of the new school to the local architectural firm of Wells & Dow. The building of the structure was completed by J. J. Lohrenz.

Rogers was somewhat unusual, serving as both a replacement of an existing high school, as well as a new school. At the time, Rogers was the only school located on the north side of the city. With the more westward location of the new school, Rogers was able to accommodate the city by serving an expanded geographic area and student population. While the school was initially able to house 800 students, expansion possibilities would accommodate 1,000. The auditorium theater was two stories high, with tiered seating for 635 students on the main level and another 250 on the upper balcony.

=== Construction and labor ===
The contract for general construction of the new high school was awarded to J.J. Lohrenz. Following the fall of the stock market, economic depression had set in, along with high unemployment throughout the country. Among the stipulations of awarding the construction contract to Lohrenz was the agreement to ensure that all construction materials and labor would be sourced locally. While new construction was generally at a minimum, the project provided employment for hundreds of Spokane residents. Local contractors included Washington Brick and Lime to supply all the brick and tile; along with Jensen-Byrd (hardware); O.N. Wolff (cut stone), and John Malnati (plastering).

=== Innovation and design ===
The design of the school included several innovative features, many of which were new to not only Spokane, but the Pacific Northwest. The new school had the first building-wide public address system in Spokane; the first 8-circuit electric signal clock, which rang class bells automatically; the first built-in-the-wall student lockers in Spokane; modern acoustical ceilings; and a new ventilation system, which reduced fuel bills and kept the building temperature at 70 degrees.

The architectural style used for the school was considered cutting edge design. Art Deco style was popular throughout the world. The external and internal design used zigzags, chevrons, circles, parallel and stepped back lines, and stylized vegetation. The historic portion of the school uses brick and cast stone, built onto a reinforced concrete superstructure. The architectural form of the building is a geometrically-balanced edifice with symmetrical rows of large, multiple-pane windows, which are softened by the ornamental use of Art Deco design details.

A bird's eye view of the school building resembles a slightly irregular E-shaped design, with the school auditorium in the center. Two rectangular, fully enclosed courtyards surround the east and west sides of the auditorium. These courtyards, or light wells, allow ventilation and natural lighting to reach the auditorium and interior corridors of the building.

A number of features visible from the roof include ventilation louvers, elevator penthouses, and skyview crow's nest, in keeping with the Pirate mascot used throughout the school. The skyline of the school is dominated by a tall, square chimney stack, featuring elaborately designed corbelled brick edging.

=== Dedication ===
After only nine months, the school was ready for students. Official dedication of the school took place in the school auditorium on March 1, 1932. Public speakers and ceremony participants included N. D. Showalter, state superintendent of public education; Orville C. Pratt, Spokane school superintendent; and city officials and student representatives from other high schools and junior high schools of Spokane. School District 81 board members in attendance included Evan Berg, chairman; Kate Kimpson, buildings and grounds committee chairman; Roy Redfield; Alex Turnbull; and Dr. T. D. Burger.

=== Renovations ===
When completed, the new building was a symmetrical design. The front wing of the building form was three stories high, while the auditorium and the east and west wings were two stories high. This symmetry was altered in 1941, when new classrooms were built above the east rear wing. In 1969, symmetry was restored when another story was added to the west rear wing. The new addition lacked windows and the walls were clad with metal. This anomaly was removed during the 2009 construction of the new rear addition.

==== 2009 renovation and addition ====
John R. Rogers High School was preserved and restored by NAC Architecture as part of a major addition and modernization project included in a voter-approved school facility improvement bond. The original 1932 three-story structure was renovated and modernized to complement the classic Art Deco design. The updates, new construction and renovation included: demolition and replacement of the Pittsburg Street Annex Building, along with the Family and Consumer Science/Art Building; renovated and new academic classrooms; replacement of career and technical education spaces; replacement of the cafeteria with a new student commons; increase of the current gymnasium size with improved locker rooms; new safety and security systems; and community-use spaces. The building totals 260,000 square feet, an increase of 90,000 square feet over the previous size.

=== National Register of Historic Places ===
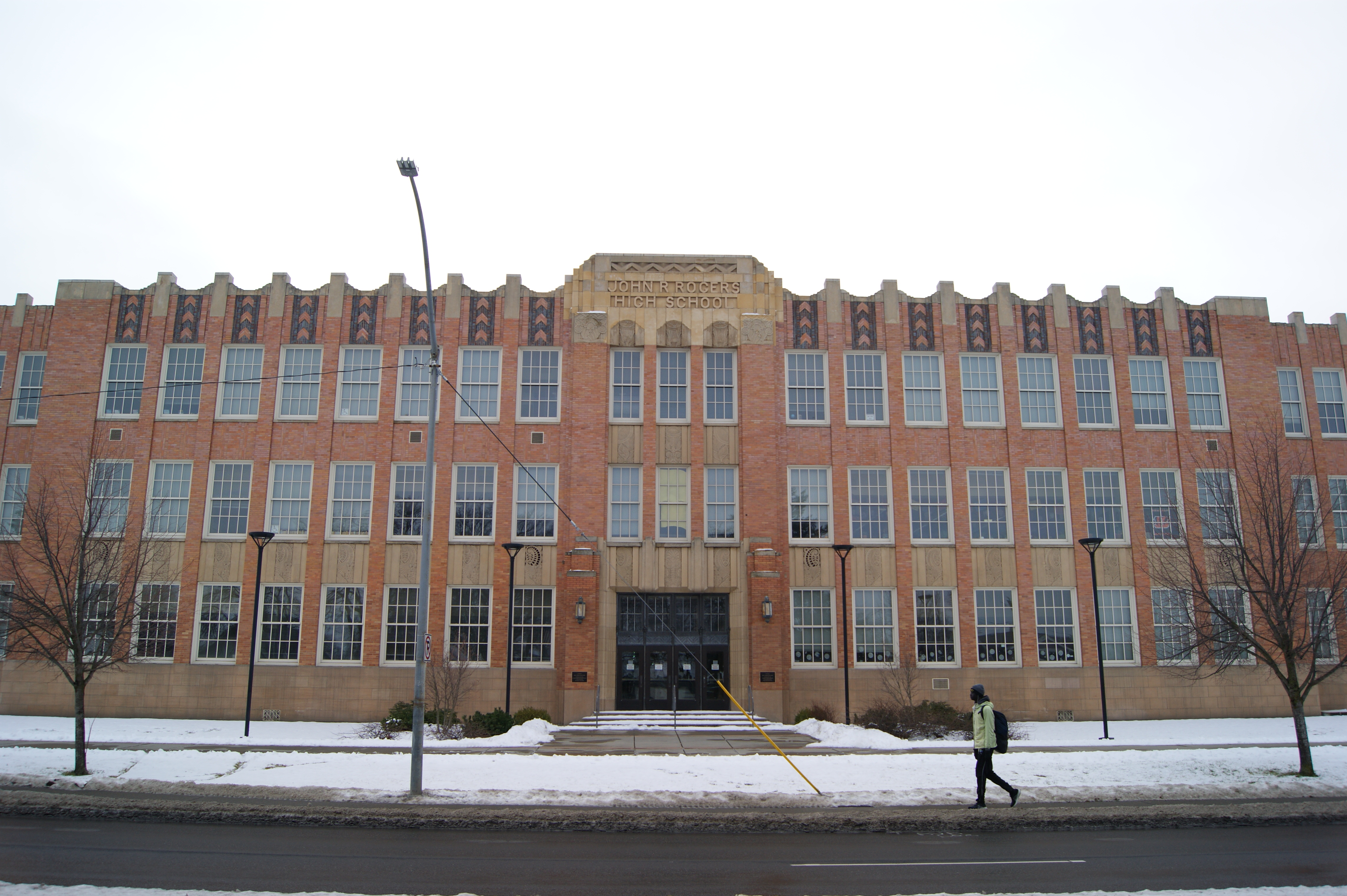
Historic art deco façade fronting Wellesley Avenue

On January 7, 2011, John R. Rogers High School was honored with an official listing on the National Register of Historic Places, representing an outstanding example of the Art Deco style in Spokane, as applied to public structures. Although the interior was significantly renovated in 2009, which added another 170,000 square feet (16,000 m^{2}) to the three-story structure, the exterior of the original 90,000 square feet (8,400 m^{2}) school building largely retains the same appearance as when it was first constructed in 1932.

== Recognition ==
=== Location filming ===
Two movies have been filmed on location at the school. Vision Quest, a 1985 film starring Matthew Modine, Linda Fiorentino, and Ronny Cox, was filmed on the Rogers campus in 1984, primarily using the exterior, classrooms, and gymnasium. The school was referred to as "Thompson High School" in the story. Several students and graduates of the school were used as extras in the film. The wrestling team in the movie was portrayed by former members of the Pirates championship wrestling team, and coached by Ken Pelo, who had served as wrestling coach at Rogers for 37 years. In 1998, Pelo was inducted into the Washington State Wrestling Coaches Hall of Fame.

In 2002, the thriller Hangman's Curse, based on the Frank Peretti novel of the same name and starring David Keith and Mel Harris, was filmed at the school. The story involves a mystery of school bullying, suicide, ghosts, and spiritual warfare, told from a Christian perspective. The film included hundreds of Rogers students as extras, with some earning significant screen time.

=== Milken Educator Award ===
In late 2007, teacher Erin Jones was named one of the winners of the Milken National Educational Award (known now as the Milken Educator Award) administered by the Milken Family Foundation. Only 80 teachers in the United States received this award in 2007. Unlike most awards, educators are recommended in confidentiality through their state's department of education instead of applying through a formal application process. The Milken Educator Award are the largest national teacher recognition program and was dubbed the "Oscars of Teaching" by Teacher magazine. To honor the recipients as the best teachers in the country, the award also comes with a $25,000 cash prize. Later, Jones was hired by the State Superintendent to oversee the Center for Improvement of Student Learning. Shortly thereafter, she was promoted to serve as Assistant State Superintendent for Student Achievement.

=== 2011 Federal grant ===
In 2011, Rogers received a $4 million federal grant to improve its graduation rate and academics. Throughout Spokane, in the 2010 class of 2,272 students who started as freshman, only 1,479 graduated, a rate of 65 percent. The school with the lowest rate was Rogers, with a graduation rate of 43 percent. In spite of these low rates, the school was named by Newsweek magazine, as one of the top 1,600 schools in the United States. Several conditions were required of the grant, one of which included replacing the principal and transforming the academic program. Lori Wyborney was brought on staff as principal, while the school added 100 hours to its schedule. The administration additionally started the 2011–2012 year two days early and added 30 minutes to each school day.

== Academics ==
Beyond required classes in the core areas (math, science, social studies, and English), John R. Rogers offers a wide variety of elective courses, including an honors and Advanced Placement (AP) program. World language studies include German, Japanese, French, and Spanish.

=== Advanced placement ===
The John R. Rogers Advanced Placement (AP) program is entitled "Summer Bridge". The program is designed to provide support and structure in preparation for college and career readiness. Courses provided include studies in science and math, social studies, and English. Summer opportunities and assignments provide students with resources to get a head start on the upcoming school year.

=== Library services ===
In 1932, the original school library encompassed a space no larger than three average-sized classrooms. In 1995, the library went through extensive renovation, which included tearing down corridor walls, more than doubling the size of the library. During the 2009 renovation, the library was expanded to include 42 computer stations. The school also offers remote access for online books and resources, available through Cengage Learning databases. Approximately 12,000 books and 3,000 magazines are available for use.

== Sports ==
John R. Rogers competes in WIAA Class 2A and is a member of the Greater Spokane League in District Eight.

=== State championships ===
- Boys cross country: 1965
- Girls cross country: 1990
- Boys track and field: 1946
- Girls track and field: 1986

== Clubs and activities ==
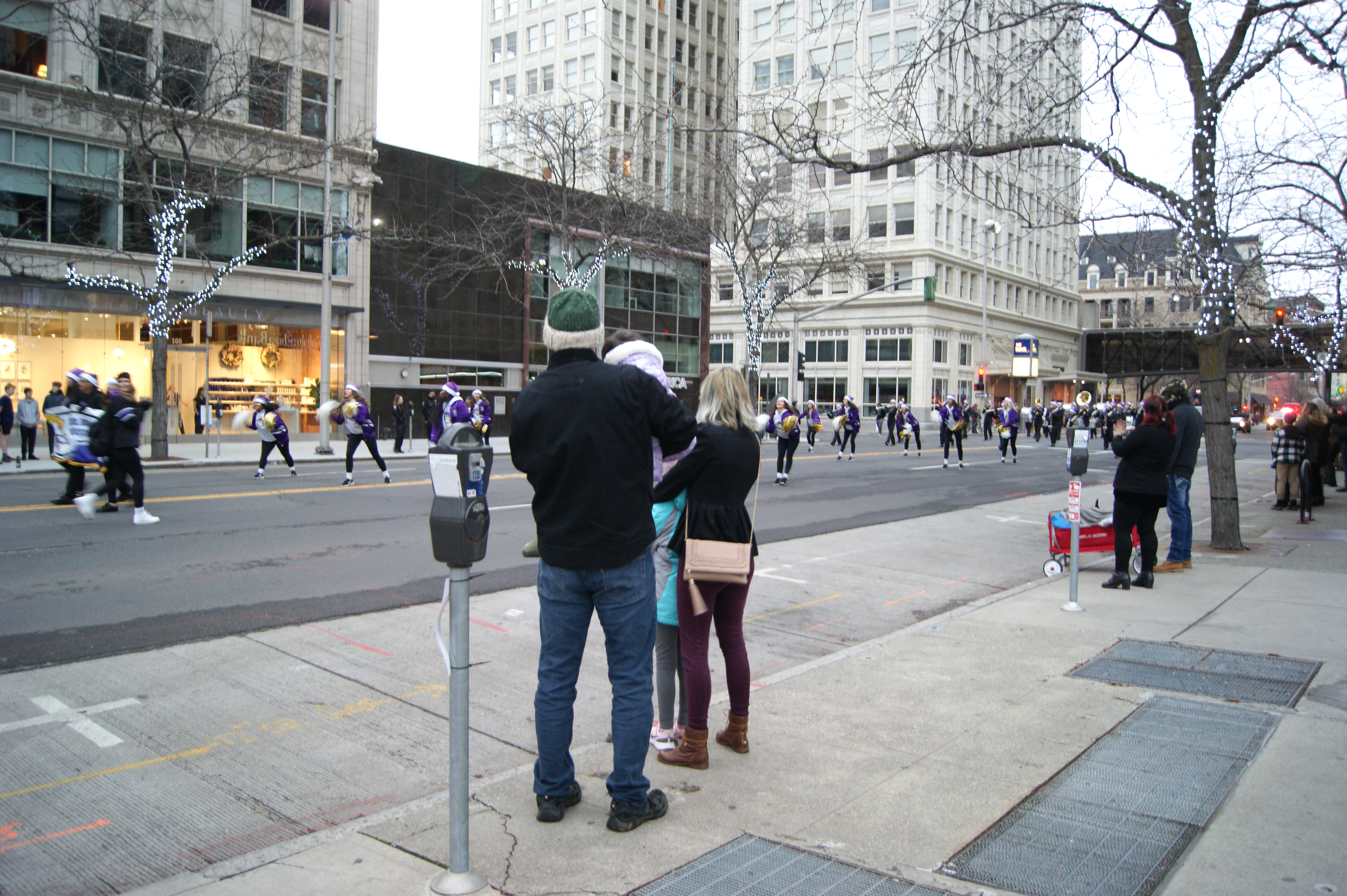
Rogers High students participating in the 2021 Lilac Festival holiday parade

- ASB
- booster club
- cheerleading
- chess club
- choir
- Dance Team
- DECA
- Drama
- GSA
- Interact
- Instrumental
- National Honor Society
- Photography
- Step team
- Walk of Fame
- Washington Drug Free Youth
- Yearbook staff
- FIRST Robotics team
- CyberPatriot
- SkillsUSA
- Sign Language

Clubs & Activities Directory

- FCCLA

== Notable alumni ==
- Wayne D. Anderson (1949 graduate) former University of Idaho Football, Baseball, and Basketball coach.
- Stephen Drury (1973 graduate)
- Ted Robert Gurr (1953 graduate)
- Dennis E. Hardy (1968 graduate), Deputy Commanding General, United States Army Central
- Gerry Lindgren (1964 graduate)
- Waldo George Magnuson, Jr. (1951 graduate), Guggenheim Fellow, Senior Staff Engineer (Rtd.), Lawrence Livermore National Laboratory
- Ted Nichols (1946 graduate)
- Deanna Oliver (1972 graduate)
- Doug Sutherland (1955 graduate)

== Demographics ==
The following demographic figures are current as of October 2010, unless otherwise noted.

Enrollment
October 2010 Student Count	1,620
May 2011 Student Count	1,456

Gender
Male	51.4%
Female	48.6%

Ethnicity/Race
Caucasian	71.3%
Hispanic/Mexican	7.7%
American Indian/Alaskan Native	4.3%
Asian/Pacific Islander	6.9%
African American/Black	3.5%
Two or More Races	6.2%
Unknown	.1%

Special Programs
Free or Reduced-Price Meals (May 2011)	73.8%
Special Education (May 2011)	17.8%
Transitional Bilingual (May 2011)	6.4%
Migrant (May 2011)	0%
Section 504 (May 2011)	2.2%
Foster Care (May 2011)	.3%

Other Information
Annual Dropout Rate (2009–10)	6.6%
Estimated Annual On-Time Graduation Rate (2009–10)	60.4%
Estimated Annual Extended Graduation Rate (2009–10)	64.3%
Actual Adjusted On-Time Cohort Graduation Rate (Class of 2010)	55%
Actual Adjusted 5–year Cohort Extended Graduation Rate (Class of 2010)	66.1%

== See also ==
- Governor John R. Rogers High School
- Education in Spokane, Washington
- National Register of Historic Places listings in Spokane County, Washington

== Notes ==
1. Annual Dropout Rate (2009–10 school year) for students in grades 9–12: The total number of students identified as dropping out divided by the net total number of students served. Net students is determined by the total number of students in grades 9 through 12 reported as served during the school year, less the total number of students exited with a confirmed transfer out of the school/district or who have become deceased. Students reported as having an expected year of graduation prior to 2010 and who were reported as dropouts are not included in these calculations.
2. Estimated Annual On-Time Graduation Rate (2009–10 school year): This rate represents those students who were reported as graduating during the 2009–10 school year and whose expected graduation year was 2010.
3. Estimated Annual Extended Graduation Rate (2009–10 school year): This rate includes students who graduated during the 2009–10 school year after their expected graduation year (prior to 2010). Late graduates are added to the total number of on-time graduates in the year they graduate when calculating the extended graduation rate.
4. Actual Adjusted On-Time Cohort Graduation Rate (Class of 2010): The total number of students identified in grade 9 as belonging to the Class of 2010 (during the 2006–07 school year) who are reported as graduates, divided by the total number of students identified as the Class of 2010, during the 2009–10 school year. Students who enrolled at any time prior to the end of the 2009–10 school year, identified as belonging to the Class of 2010, are included in the calculations. Students identified as belonging to the Class of 2010 who have exited with a confirmed transfer or who have become deceased are removed from the calculations.
5. Actual Adjusted 5–year Cohort Graduation Rate (reported with the Class of 2010): The total number of students identified as belonging to the Class of 2009 who are reported as graduates within the 2009–10 school year. While these students graduate with the Class of 2010 they are graduating a year after their expected year of graduation, 2009. These students are added to the total number of graduates in the Class of 2010 when calculating the Adjusted 5–year Cohort Rate.
