= Bemiss, Spokane =

Bemiss
- Neighborhood
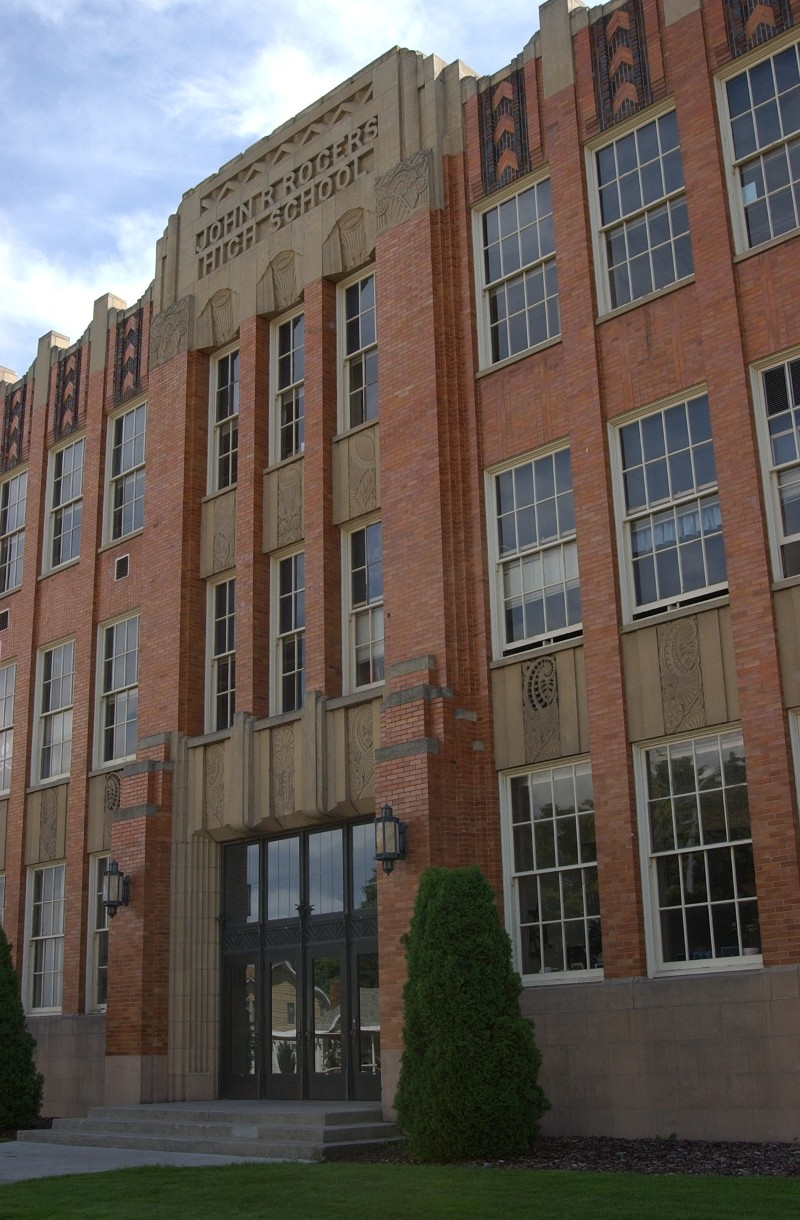
- John R. Rogers High School in Bemiss

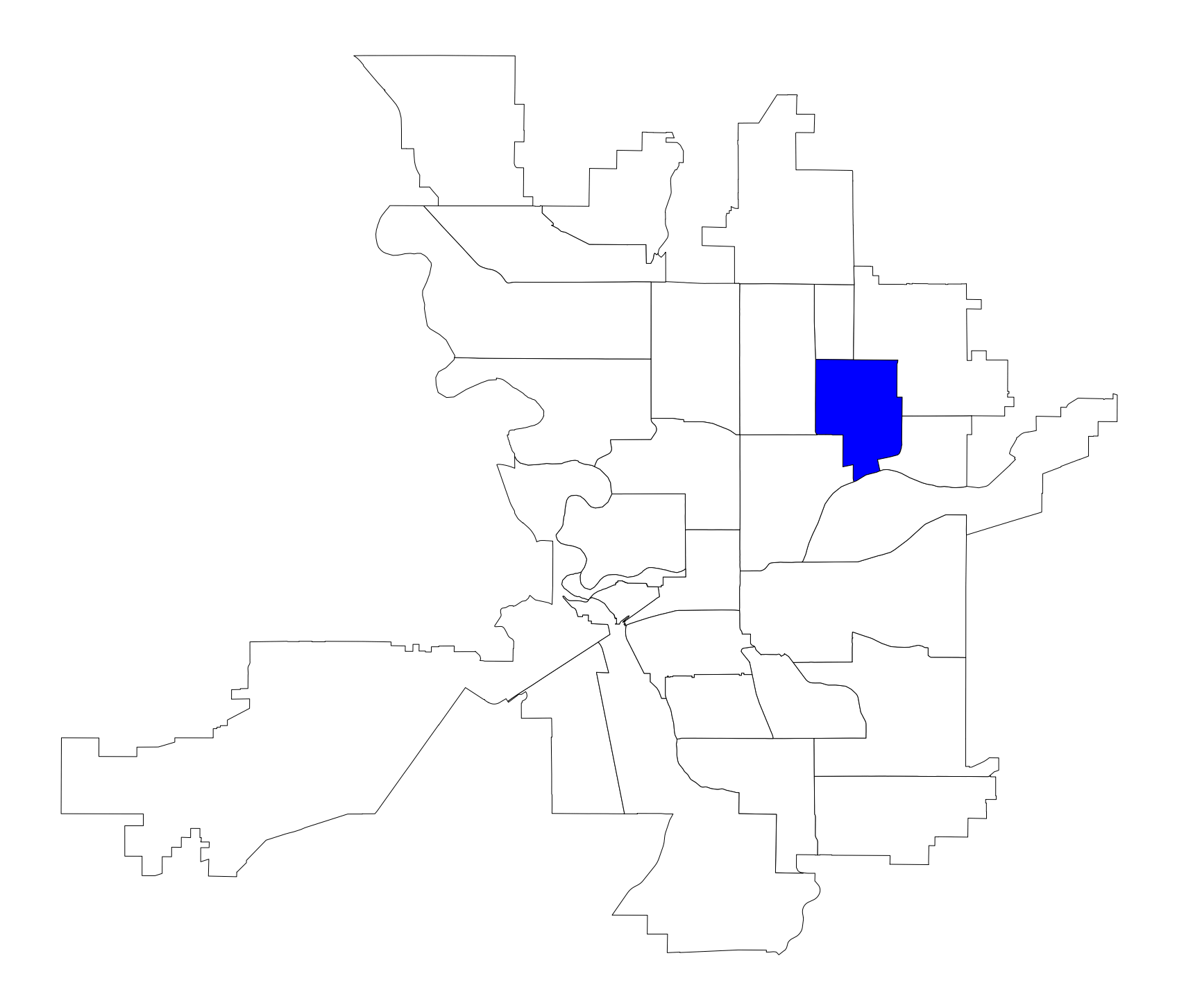
- Location within the city of Spokane
- Coordinates: 47°41′24.3″N 117°22′30.8″W
- Country: United States
- State: Washington
- County: Spokane
- City: Spokane

Population (2017)
  - Total: 8,633

Demographics 2017
  - White: 80.3%
  - Black: 2.7%
  - Hispanic: 7.9%
  - Asian: 4.4%
  - Native American: 3.4%
- Time zone: UTC-8 (PST)
  - Summer (DST): UTC-7 (PDT)
- ZIP Codes: 99207
- Area code: 509

Bemiss is a neighborhood in Spokane, Washington. It is located within City Council District 1, which covers the northeastern section of the city. The neighborhood is bounded by Wellesley Avenue to the north, Market Street to the east, Illinois Avenue and the Spokane River to the south, and Perry Street and Napa Street to the west. It is located to the southeast of the Hillyard neighborhood and is often grouped into greater Hillyard.

The neighborhood is named for David Bemiss, an early settler in the area and superintendent of schools in Spokane.

== Geography ==
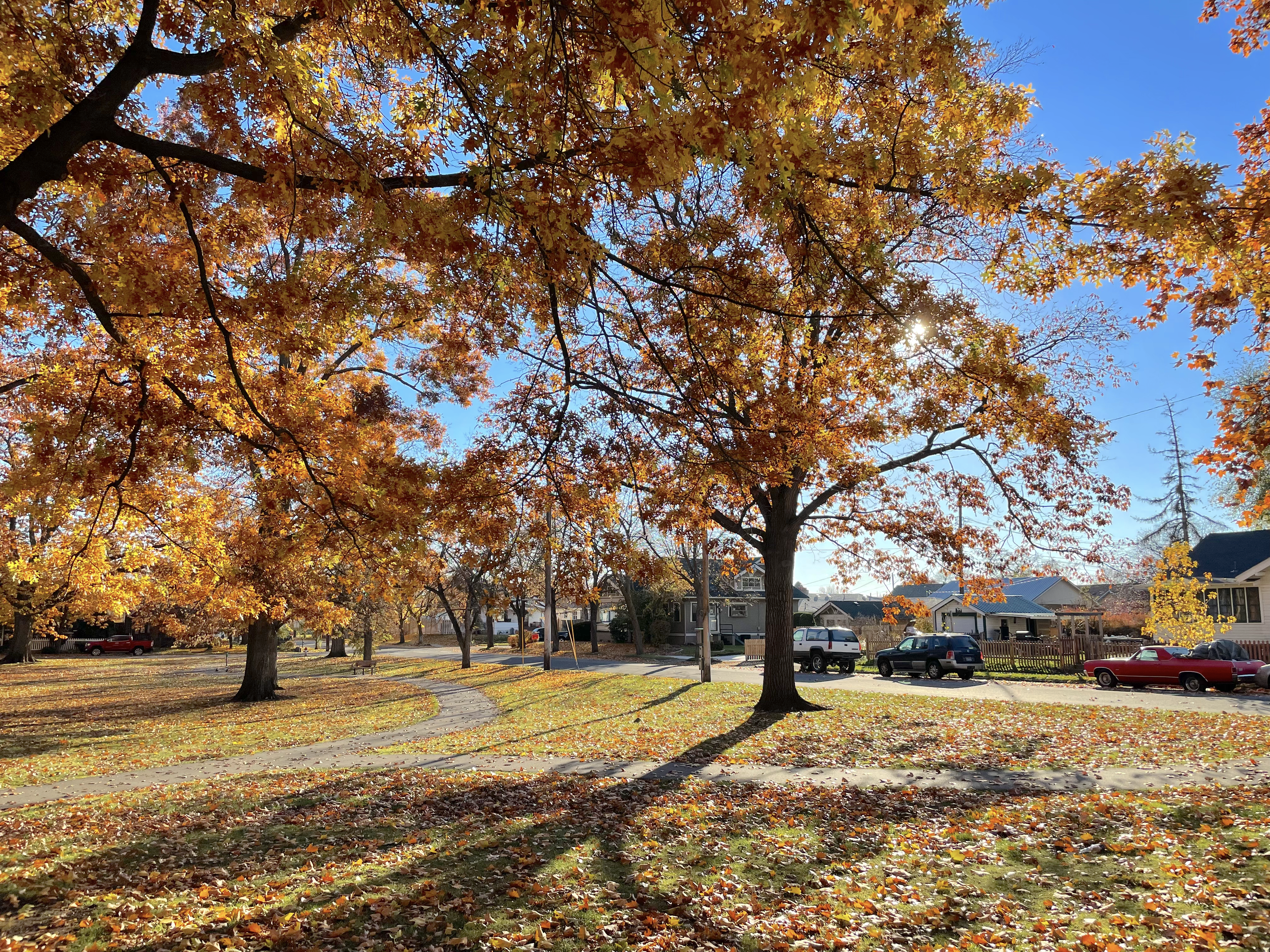
Hays Park in late October

The intersection of Empire Avenue and Crestline Road, two arterials that meet near the center of the neighborhood, is 4.2 miles by road from Spokane City Hall in Downtown Spokane. Wellesley Avenue, a major arterial on the north side of town, is the neighborhood's northern border. Market and Haven Streets, also major arterials on the north side of town, delimit the eastern border. To the south the border is irregular, following North Foothills Drive to Napa Street, Illinois Avenue to Crestline Street, the Spokane River to Smith Street and then back along Illinois Avenue to Market Street. The western border runs down Perry Street to Euclid Avenue and Napa Street to Illinois Avenue.

== Demographics ==
As of 2017, the population of Bemiss was 8,633 in 3,263 households. 49.2% of those households are rented, compared to 45.3% of households citywide. 29.1% of Bemiss residents are age 19 or under and 11.6% are age 65 or older. The median household income is $34,565, below the citywide average of $44,768. 74.7% of students qualify for free or reduced lunch. 37.2% of residents have a high school diploma only and 8.7% have a bachelor's degree or higher. The unemployment rate is 10.3%.

Of the residents, 85.8% were born in the United States. The top countries for the foreign born population are Ukraine, accounting for 54.4% of all foreign born residents, followed by Mexico at 9%, Belarus at 5.1% and Canada at 4.4%.

== History ==
The adjacent neighborhood of Hillyard was once a separate city and the present day Bemiss neighborhood grew up as part of both Hillyard and Spokane. Hillyard was platted in 1892, incorporated in 1907. In 1907, the area northeast of Rich Avenue and Crestline Street, the northeastern corner of the current neighborhood, was incorporated into Hillyard. The rest of the neighborhood was incorporated into the City of Spokane that same year. Spokane annexed Hillyard in 1924.

Rail trolleys and streetcars connected the neighborhood to downtown Spokane, to the southwest, and the rest of the Spokane area.

== Education ==
Bemiss is served by Spokane Public Schools. The neighborhood is home to two public elementary schools, one middle and one high school. Bemiss Elementary, located in the neighborhood, serves the bulk of the neighborhood. Regal Elementary, also located in the neighborhood, serves the northern section of the neighborhood. Longfellow Elementary, in the adjacent North Hill neighborhood, serves Bemiss east of Helena between Glass and Rich. Logan Elementary, in the adjacent Logan neighborhood, serves the far southern portion of Bemiss along the river south of Illinois. Bemiss, Regal and Longfellow all feed into Shaw Middle School, which is located in Bemiss, and then into John R. Rogers High School, also located in Bemiss. The Logan district feeds into Yasuhara Middle School in Logan and then into North Central High School in Emerson/Garfield. The On Track Academy, an alternative public high school, is located in Bemiss adjacent to Regal Elementary and Shaw Middle School.

== Transportation ==
=== Surface Streets ===
Bemiss' roads are connected to the rest of the city street system by a pair of primary artierals. The Market Street on the east and Wellesley Avenue on the north are both classified as "urban primary arterials" by the city. Within the neighborhood there are five roads classified as "urban minor arterials", going north-south is Crestline Street, and going east-west are Upriver Drive, Illinois Avenue, Euclid Avenue and Empire Avenue.

For cyclists, there are dedicated bike lanes on Illinois Avenue and Crestline Street, while Regal Street is a designated bike route without a dedicated lane.

=== Public Transit ===
Public transit in Bemiss is provided by the Spokane Transit Authority, which serves the neighborhood and the rest of the Spokane urban area. The neighborhood is served by two fixed-route bus lines.

| Route | Termini | | | Service operation and notes | Streets traveled |
|---|---|---|---|---|---|
| 33; Wellesley | Spokane Community College; SCC Transit Center | ↔ | Spokane Falls Community College; Spokane Falls Station | High-frequency route | Market/Haven, Wellesley |
| 27; Hillyard | Downtown Spokane; STA Plaza | ↔ | Balboa/South Indian Trail; Five Mile Park & Ride | Basic-frequency route; Downtown Spokane via Hillyard | Crestline, Empire, Regal/Haven |
