= Transformational Christianity =

Modern evangelical movement

Transformational Christianity, or Transformationalism, represents a fusion of evangelicalism, Pentecostalism, and ecumenism that started becoming prominent in the early 21st century. Unlike previous movements, it is typically embodied in regional meta-church organizations—alliances of churches from different denominational backgrounds—rather than particular churches, denominations, or parachurch organizations. Critics of Transformationalism accuse it of overemphasizing eschatology, false dichotomies, unnecessary idealism and a tendency to be corrosive of individual church identities.

== Radical middle ==
Transformational Christianity interprets the gospel from a unified perspective of transforming individuals, relationships, and institutions. It thus tends to align intellectually with evangelicals, emotionally with charismatics, and socially with ecumenicals—though only up to a point. The emphasis is less on being theologically or politically correct than on being effective in transforming the believer and the world around. It thus tends to reflect the kingdom theology of Gordon Fee's radical middle approach to Christianity, which characterizes the role of the church as manifesting God's kingdom on Earth.

== Defining beliefs ==
Ed Silvoso identifies "Five Pivotal Paradigms" he considers essential for sustainable transformation to take place. Specifically, he calls people to recognize that:

- The Great Commission is about discipling nations, not just people.
- The marketplace (the heart of the nation) has already been redeemed by Jesus and now needs to be reclaimed by His followers.
- Labor is the premier expression of worship on Earth, and every believer is a minister.
- Our primary call is not to build the Church, but to take the kingdom of God where the kingdom of darkness is still entrenched, in order for Jesus to build His Church.
- The premier social indicator that transformation has taken place is the elimination of systemic poverty.

== Marketplace ministers ==
One defining aspect of transformationalism is its focus on what are called marketplace ministers. In this context, as in many Christian circles, the term marketplace is used to represent business, education, and government—i.e., everything outside the church and family. The heroes of most other movements are celebrated for their church-related activities (e.g., evangelists, missionaries, bishops, apostles, etc.). In contrast, the heroes of transformationalism are lionized for their work outside the church. Importantly, they are expected to deliver secular success (new business, increased profits or efficiency, improved workplace conditions) as a precondition to spiritual success (conversions, transformed lifestyles, formal acknowledgement of Christianity, etc.). They are not valued just for making money, or even just for bringing people into the church; rather, they are seen as the primary carriers for bringing the "kingdom of God" or "presence of Jesus Christ" into the world.

In one sense, this is a return to the ideals of the Protestant Reformation, with its emphasis on the "priesthood of all believers" and the value of secular work. The key difference is that transformationalism is set in the context of a post-Christian culture, where personal evangelism is both possible and (in this view) necessary. Thus, secular work is also viewed as a platform for evangelization. At the same time, transformationalists would also affirm—and celebrate—the intrinsic value of work, both as an aspect of worship and as a service to society.

== Regional pastoring ==
A related innovation is the concept of citywide pastoring. The key premise is that in addition to the concepts of one "church universal" and many "local congregations," which most Christians accept, there is also a third level: "the church in the city". The idea is that all the congregations in a particular region, of whatever denomination, are really aspects of a single church family, and should actively think, plan, and work together under that common framework. This does not mean that a single unifying structure is imposed from above, as in the old establishment idea of parishes. Rather, it involves formalizing the existing networks of relationship and trust into a coherent organizational structure, usually involving councils of recognized leaders from different communities. This typically means the church as a whole develops a common vision, which is implemented by individual congregations with minimal explicit coordination. It also enables the Christian community to speak with one voice when dealing with local government; however, the focus is usually on finding ways to cooperate in serving the community, rather than dictating policy.

== History ==
The concept of transformation was initiated as a result of claims regarding an apparent series of citywide revivals which took place in several South American locations in the 1980s and 1990s. Starting in the mid-1970s and into the 1980s, the focuses of a loose network of evangelical pastors in South America converged to form what is termed strategic spiritual warfare. These pastors included Argentinian Baptist Eduardo Lorenzo (a revivalist who studied spiritual warfare to defeat local demons), Youth With a Mission's John Dawson (who wrote about demonic control of geographic regions), New Apostolic Reformation (NAR) evangelist Ed Silvoso (who used prayer to defeat a supposed warlock in an area lacking evangelical churches), and evangelist Carlos Annacondia (who focused on missions work and exorcism). Believing that territorial spirits – demons controlling specific areas – were hindering mission efforts, the concept of spiritual mapping to plot out these areas and their problems, particularly social ills, took form. Removing malign influences was seen to open the way for spiritual revival and societal transformation. These spiritual mapping and spiritual warfare techniques caught the interest of NAR leader C. Peter Wagner. Such revival was believed to be happening in South America in the late 1980s and early 1990s. Wagner and Silvoso were key promoters of the revival and spiritual warfare methodology leading up to it and helped spread the concepts more widely in evangelicalism.

The claims were widely promoted in videos produced by George Otis, Jr. (coiner of the terms spiritual mapping and the 10/40 window) under the titles Transformations (2000) and Transformations II (2002). The films claim drug arrests (see Cali Cartel) were connected to revival in the Colombian city as well as purported reports of giant vegetables grown in Guatemala, community transformation in the Canadian Arctic, Ugandan revival and dramatic increases in church attendance. Jack Dennison also wrote a book, City Reaching. This provided further impetus within the fundamentalist Christian world to Otis' teaching in both city reaching and marketplace ministry techniques. Silvoso popularized the latter approach in his book Anointed for Business, which introduced the term Marketplace Transformation. This combined with the concept of community transformation to develop a more general focus on transformation. As of January 2025, the videos are still being sold from Otis' Sentinel Group website store.

The term Transformationalism was apparently first used in conjunction with groups such as Pray the Bay in early 2004, reflecting a more general view of transformation as a key (if not defining) attribute of the Christian life. This coincided with a possibly unrelated increase in the use of the term 'transformation' by a wide range of different churches and organizations during 2004.

Transformation conferences in 2005 (Indonesia) and 2007 (Seoul, Korea) focused on five "streams": saturation church planting; revival; reaching cities; marketplace ministry and economic development for the poor. The goal was, among other things, to develop a transformational covenant, to provide further definition to this movement.

The claims made by Otis in the Transformations videos have been unable to be verified when investigated by neutral researchers, journalists and his critics. The Transformations videos circulated widely through Pentecostal, charismatic and similar spirit-filled Christian churches all over the world. Copies of the videos (and later DVDs) and other associated books and commercial merchandise generated huge personal and corporate profits for various Christian leaders and religious organizations through on-selling in churches. The videos had a significant impact in the conservative Australian city of Toowoomba, where large numbers of fundamentalist and Pentecostal Christians became convinced of the power of strategic level spiritual warfare to bring about a revival and transformation there. Claims were made, sometimes through so-called prophecies, that this action would lead to Toowoomba becoming a hub for the anticipated great Australian revival, as well as the achievement of reduced sinfulness, a lower crime rate, general prosperity among the population, greatly increased church attendance, the installation of men and women of God into government and a reduced commitment to cults.

== Comparisons ==
Transformationalism can be considered a more secular version of the Manifest Sons of God doctrine that emerged from the Latter Rain Movement. It is also similar to the revivalism of traditional Evangelicalism. However, by shifting the focus from individual conversion to large-scale transformation, it adopts an approach not unlike the social gospel that characterized the progressive or liberal Evangelicalism of the pre-war period (this is in contrast to the more confrontational approach of fundamentalism). Unlike the Christian Right, transformationalists emphasize that the way to achieve a renewed society is through personal testimony and servant-leadership towards those in power, rather than political maneuvering. This places it near to progressive evangelicalism. Some aspects are reminiscent of the Dutch Neo-Calvinists, Abraham Kuyper and Herman Dooyeweerd, especially talk of "filling up the spheres of society."

Transformational groups typically involve a cross-section of Protestant, Catholic, Eastern Orthodox, and non-denominational churches and parachurch organizations (though not borderline groups, such as Mormons). Most still tend to have an evangelical, or even fundamentalist, statement of faith; however, they are generally more concerned with being inclusive than exclusive, and often will attempt to accommodate individuals and churches with more liberal theological views if they share a compatible vision of the goals and means of transformation. Transformational movements are often mediated by other trans-denominational initiatives such as the Alpha Course or Promise Keepers, which share a similar heritage and goals.

Transformational Christianity is one attempt to aid evangelicals in what Christianity Today calls "a paradigm shift—in their understanding of conversion and redemption".

== Organizations ==
- Harvest Evangelism's Apostolic Transformation Network
- Transform World
- The Real Talk Program on KFIA radio with Joe Pursch
- Center for Transformational Christianity, Sacramento, CA
- Transformational Alliance of Santa Clara County (Northern California, USA)
