= WUFM =

Christian rock radio station in Columbus, Ohio

- Columbus, Ohio; United States
- Broadcast area: Columbus Metro Area
- Frequency: 88.7 MHz
- Branding: RadioU

Programming
- Language: English
- Format: Christian rock and Christian contemporary hit radio

Ownership
- Owner: Spirit Communications, Inc.; (Spirit Communications, Inc.)

History
- First air date: March 22, 1996

Technical information
- Licensing authority: FCC
- Facility ID: 20758
- Class: B
- ERP: 5,000 watts
- HAAT: 236 meters (774 ft)
- Transmitter coordinates: 39°56′16.00″N 83°01′16.00″W

Links
- Public license information: Public file; LMS
- Webcast: Listen live
- Website: radiou.com

WUFM (88.7 FM, "RadioU") is a non-commercial radio station licensed to Columbus, Ohio. The station retransmits its signal to several FM stations and FM translators nationwide including WPRJ, a full-service FM station licensed to Coleman, Michigan.

RadioU primarily plays alternative and heavier music across several genres, including hip-hop, pop rock, hard rock, hardcore punk, and metal, as well as electronic dance music. The station is accessible worldwide through its website radiou.com and can be seen through its music TV stream, RadioU TV.

== RadioU TV ==
RadioU TV, formerly known as TVU, is a commercial-free, Christian rock television network which broadcasts through the Internet. It was formerly available on satellite and IPTV provider Sky Angel.

RadioU TV airs several shows, aside from its normal programming:

- Battery plays metalcore music videos from bands such as Underoath, Norma Jean and Demon Hunter.
- RadioU TV's Most Wanted (formerly TVU's Most Wanted, or TMW) is a countdown of the top videos of the week. Hudson is the host.
- Fusion plays hip-hop artists.

RadioU TV is available for free in a 720p high-definition television format on the station's website. standard-definition streams are also available in 360p and 480p.

In the past, RadioU TV (as TVU) was available as a standard-definition television channel on Sky Angel IPTV from 2007 to 2014, and on satellite from 2001 to 2008. TVU was also simulcast from 1 am to 5 pm ET on the Kids & Teens TV (KTV) satellite station, which was available on Dish Network until January 31, 2019.

== Ownership ==
RadioU is owned and operated by Spirit Communications, Inc., a non-profit organization funded by listener donations. RadioU does not have commercial sponsors and is kept running through listener donations received during its twice-yearly on-air fundraisers.

== Repeaters ==
Call sign	Frequency	City of license	State	Facility ID	Class	ERP (W)	Height (m (ft))
WPRJ	101.7 FM	Coleman	Michigan	12527	A	4,600	114 m

=== Translators ===
Call sign	Frequency (MHz)	City of license	State	Facility ID	Class	ERP (W)	Height (m (ft))	Rebroadcasts
W263AX	100.5	Circleville	Ohio	158610	D	75	42.6 m (140 ft)	WUFM
W273BQ	102.5	Dayton	Ohio	157110	D	27	72.2 m (237 ft)	WUFM
W223CF	92.5	Mansfield	Ohio	158486	D	38	14 m (46 ft)	WUFM
W271AO	102.1	Mount Vernon	Ohio	158516	D	55	38.4 m (126 ft)	WUFM
W288CT	105.5	Newark	Ohio	158554	A	4,200	60 m (200 ft)	WUFM
W254BJ	98.7	Springfield	Ohio	145937	D	10	80 m (260 ft)	WUFM
W277BV	103.3	Zanesville	Ohio	158595	D	55	89.7 m (294 ft)	WUFM
K213EM (Note: Translator serves Oklahoma City)	90.5	Edmond	Oklahoma	106683	D	23	320 m (1,050 ft)	WPRJ
W278BX	103.5	Saginaw	Michigan	144582	D	30	76 m	WPRJ
W244BS	96.7	Alma	Michigan	144639	D	250	13.8 m	WPRJ
