= House (novel) =

2006 novel by Frank Peretti and Ted Dekker

- First edition
- Author: Frank Peretti and Ted Dekker
- Language: English
- Genre: Horror Thriller
- Publisher: WestBow Press (US)
- Publication date: 2006
- Publication place: United States
- Media type: Print (hardback and paperback)
- Pages: 400
- ISBN: 1-59554-155-1 (hardcover)
- OCLC: 62782137
- Dewey Decimal: 813/.54 22
- LC Class: PS3566.E691317 H68 2006

House is a 2006 horror novel co-authored by Christian writers Frank Peretti and Ted Dekker. It loosely ties in with Dekker's Books of History Chronicles via the Paradise books.

== Plot summary ==
A husband and wife are having marital problems and find themselves stranded on the side of the road in the middle of nowhere Alabama. To their relief, they come across what looks like a beautiful Victorian House, and enter. To their horror, they find it is haunted. Jack and Stephanie think that working together is the key to survival outside of the House haunted by the Masked Man named White. They cannot learn to work together until they first self reflect on their inner demons that haunt them in the House. Inside, characters accompany their journey that show and lead them through that self reflection. Through a series of haunting events, Jack learns to let go of his anger, bitterness and unforgiveness towards his wife Stephanie for taking away the one he loved most, and Stephanie learns to forgive herself, let go of regret and rekindle that romance fire with her husband. Jack and Stephanie learn to love each other again, could that love push them to work together and escape the House, and White?

== Connection to The Books of History Chronicles ==
House takes place in the same universe as The Paradise Novels (Showdown, Saint, and Sinner). In Saint, it is mentioned that Barsidious White was written into existence by Black.

== Film ==
A film adaptation of the novel was released November 7, 2008. It was rated R for some violence and terror. It was the third film based on a Frank Peretti novel, and the second based on a Ted Dekker novel.
