= WPRJ =

Coordinates: 43.811°N 84.464°W

- Coleman, Michigan; United States
- Broadcast area: Midland, Michigan
- Frequency: 101.7 MHz
- Branding: Radio U

Programming
- Format: Christian Rock

Ownership
- Owner: Spirit Communications, Inc.

History
- Former call signs: WSMZ (8/8/88-9/27/91)
- Call sign meaning: We PRaise Jesus

Technical information
- Licensing authority: FCC
- Facility ID: 12527
- Class: A
- ERP: 4,600 watts
- HAAT: 114 meters
- Repeater: 96.7 W244BS (Alma) 103.5 W278BX (Saginaw)

Links
- Public license information: Public file; LMS
- Website: (Radio U website)

WPRJ is the callsign for an FM radio station in Coleman, Michigan, which is licensed to Spirit Communications, Inc., and broadcasts at 101.7 FM. WPRJ is a non-profit Christian Rock station which retransmits the Radio U network based at WUFM in Columbus, Ohio. The station's signal covers the Mount Pleasant, Clare, Gladwin and Midland areas primarily, and can be heard also to Bay City in the east, Alma in the south, and West Branch in the north.

== History ==
=== WPRJ AM ===
WPRJ Percypeny Radio Inc.1310 am Parsippany, New Jersey. 1310 signed on as WPRJ-AM on January 13, 1973. The station was built by William P. Godley and Paul F. Godley Jr. at the end of Percypenny Ln., along I-80, next to the Rockaway River. Paul's son, W. Craig Godley, also assisted during the construction. William and Paul were sons of radio pioneer Paul F. Godley Sr., who was the first amateur to receive a shortwave signal across the Atlantic. William's son, John S. Godley, was later a part-time salesman and morning DJ for WPRJ. WPRJ's format was pre-recorded easy listening music, later going live for morning drive featuring contemporary rock music. A popular show on WPRJ was "The Country Cousins Show," featuring Larry Cutrone and "The Trailmaster" Tony Cee. The show featured comedy skits and classic country music.Larry, who wrote and directed the show, later went on to become a notable screenwriter and entertainer. "The Country Cousins Show" ran for 2 years and had a dedicated following. In 1976, the station was sold and call sign was changed to WQTK.

=== WPRJ FM ===
The man known as “Gary B” worked with the radio station WCEN for 34 years and then began managing the Christian station WPRJ in Coleman in 1992.

WPRJ FM came into existence when General Manager Gary "B" Bugh and wife Patty Jo had a desire to bring a 24-hour contemporary Christian radio station to the Central Michigan area. Gary was a Michigan radio personality who had worked at WCEN-AM & WCEN-FM for several years.

After several failed attempts with different frequencies on AM or FM radio, WPRJ finally settled at 101.5 FM on December 7, 1992. For most of 1992, the station was only operational a few hours a day and had a combination Praise and Worship and Contemporary Christian format. This continued until the station became automated and affiliated with the MorningStar Radio Network. During this time, the station was Contemporary Christian in format and used their callsign as an acronym for promotions (We PRaise Jesus). Later, the station adopted the slogan "Piercing the Darkness with the Light of Christ," a phrase taken from the popular book, "Piercing the Darkness," by Frank E. Peretti.

During these early years the station worked to build an audience and market itself as a Christian brand in Central Michigan. Jeff Schultz was the local voice in the mornings with the show "Daybreak". In addition to this role Jeff was also responsible for sales. Brian "Doc" Erwin (1992–2002), then a recent graduate of Spring Arbor University was later brought in to cover evenings and become the first music director. Tim Wright (1993–1996) was an on-air talent who would leave the station for full-time missions in Africa. Connie Weiber (1992–2006) and former executive board member was also prominent at this time as the Operations Manager and voice talent. During the early years the staff worked hard to promote a quality sound and build a local loyal audience.

==== 1995-2003 ====
The period between 1995 and 2003 provided much growth for the station. In 1996 WPRJ was required to shift its frequency from 101.5 to 101.7. This resulted in a power increase to 4600 watts from 2200. WWBN Tuscola switched from 101.7 to 101.5 which also resulted in a power increased. WHZZ 101.7 Lansing was able to increase its effective power as a result of the required frequency shifts. A new building was purchased giving the staff much needed "room to grow." The station had dropped the slogan Piercing the Darkness and was just promoting itself as "Praise Radio" and later as "FM 101.7." The morning show "Daybreak" with Jeff Shultz was becoming popular, particularly with men 28–50. Additionally, Jeff was becoming more known in the community and working with national groups such as Promise Keepers. Brian "Doc" Erwin was also continuing to enhance the music rotation of the station during live hours and working to sharpen the local feel of the station. Listeners often had no clue that the station was automated for the majority of the day. The station also hired a second Spring Arbor University graduate, Tom Davis (1999–2002) for operations and as an additional programmer.

It at this point that the management of the station began to look to the local university for production and air talent. Between 1995 and 2002 five students from Central Michigan University began to work at the station in promotions, talent and operations. Matt "Bigfoot" March (1993–1999) a broadcasting major, hosted evenings and was responsible for the creation of "Christian Skate Night" at the Midland Roll Arena and Spinning Wheels in Mt. Pleasant. Matt also provided help in studio operations and engineering. Patrick Spence (1998–2002) joined the station as an on-air personality and community promotions. He also hosted the Friday night all request jam, most of the on-location remotes, and the New Year's Eve specials. James Oakley (1999–2001) a broadcasting major started as a station intern and moved up to graphic design and evening host. Finally, Brian Mackie (1999–2002) an Education major was hired to take over Christian Skate where he made popular the phrase "If You ain't skatin, you ain't livin'" in addition to working nights and weekends. Brian quickly became popular and moved into evenings. Although Brian Mackie became a pastor in Indiana, he continues to host a radio show titled "The Good News Radio Program.

By 2003 the four college students had graduated and left work at WPRJ. The station was slow to replace them and was looking to replace the energy and community presence the students provided. Additionally, three of the four student employees went on to pursue graduate ministry studies, each obtaining a Master of Divinity and becoming full-time ministers. The station during this time was unaware that it was a training ground for future ministers. The fourth student went on for graduate studies and obtained a PhD.

In 2003 Brian "Doc" Erwin and Tom Davis also moved on to other radio opportunities leaving the station with an uncertain future and looking for direction.

==== 2003-2012 ====
Due to the success of WPRJ, several commercial Christian stations began broadcasting in the Central Michigan area. With the increased competition and the fact that WPRJ was listener supported, management felt that the station would need a new niche to remain competitive. The station moved from a Contemporary Christian format to a Christian Hit Radio format and began to be known as "The Fuse," a popular slogan for Christian Hit Radio stations.

Jeff Shultz moved out of the position of host of "Daybreak." Eli and Dice in the morning replaced "Daybreak." Scott Moore was brought on for promotions and air-talent. John Engler and Josh Thompson were new board operators.

The station garnered some attention over the Fourth of July weekend in 2008 by playing "Veggie Radio," featuring nothing but VeggieTales skits and songs. The Fuse's loyal listeners feared the stunt was a herald of a format change, but the station returned to its normal Christian Hit Radio format after the weekend was over.

The revamped "Fuse FM" featured a mix of CHR alongside secular Top 40 hits in its playlist to broaden its appeal, although it did not play mainstream music with lyrical content or themes that are contrary to Christian beliefs.

== WPRJ today ==
Because several successful commercial Christian stations began broadcasting in the Central Michigan area and the availability of streaming media, satellite radio and other emergency technologies, WPRJ could not continue as a local listener supported ministry and was sold to Spirit Communications on August 1, 2012. WPRJ dropped "Fuse FM" branding and broadcasts Radio U programming.

== Translators ==
Call sign	Frequency	City of license	FID	ERP (W)	HAAT	Class	FCC info
W244BS	96.7 FM	Alma, Michigan	144639	250	13.8 m (45 ft)	D	LMS
W278BX	103.5 FM	Saginaw, Michigan	144582	30	76 m (249 ft)	D	LMS
