= Judson Cornwall =

American writer (1924–2005)

- Born: 15 August 1924
- Died: 11 February 2005; Phoenix, Arizona
- Occupations: Christian author and speaker
- Known for: Prolific Charismatic Christian author and speaker, best remembered for in-depth teaching on worship and intimacy with God
- Spouse: Eleanor Cornwall

Judson Cornwall (15 August 1924 – 11 February 2005) was a prolific Charismatic Christian preacher, pastor, and author of over 50 books on varied subjects such as worship, praise, spiritual warfare, and death.

A third-generation minister, Judson Cornwall was preaching at the age of 7 during the Depression era, and later was regarded as an apostle and pioneer. After starting and pastoring churches in the West, Cornwall, a former Assemblies of God preacher, ministered worldwide for more than 20 years, preaching, teaching, and training ministers and laity of various denominations. His books include, Let Us Worship, Elements of Worship, and Let Us Praise.
