= Ralph Winter (producer) =

American film producer (born 1952)

- Born: Ralph Frederick Winter; April 24, 1952 (age 74); Glendale, California
- Occupation: Film producer
- Years active: 1978–present
- Spouse: Judy Beth Brown

Ralph Frederick Winter (born April 24, 1952) is an American film producer who has helped to produce blockbuster movies such as the X-Men, Fantastic Four and Star Trek series as well as I, Robot and Planet of the Apes.

Winter is a member of the Directors Guild of America and the Academy of Motion Picture Arts and Sciences.

He has helped along such film schools as the Veracity Project, Biola University, and lectured at Regent College, Vancouver.

== Early life and career ==
Winter was born in Glendale, California, the son of Effie Audrey (Crawford) and Charles Frederick Winter. He attended the University of California, Berkeley, where he studied history. His first experience in production was producing training videos for Broadway Department Stores. In 1978, Winter started working in the film business for Paramount Pictures television, where he worked on Happy Days, Laverne & Shirley, and Mork and Mindy. Following his experiences in television he started working alongside Harve Bennett on the Star Trek films. He was an associate producer on Star Trek III: The Search for Spock, executive producer on Star Trek IV: The Voyage Home and Star Trek V: The Final Frontier, and producer on Star Trek VI: The Undiscovered Country.

Winter later worked for The Walt Disney Studios to make Hocus Pocus, The Puppet Masters and Inspector Gadget, 20th Century Fox, producing earlier installments in the superhero films in the X-Men and the Fantastic Four film franchises, both of these were box office hits, as well as Planet of the Apes.

== Christian films produced ==
Winter is also active in producing Christian movies, such as Three, based on Ted Dekker's book, and Hangman's Curse and The Visitation, both of which were novel-to-movie creations written by Christian author Frank Peretti. His latest Christian film House was released in March 2009.

== Other work ==
In 2010, Winter partnered with producer Terry Botwick to form the production company, 1019 Entertainment. The company has produced the films, Cool It and Captive.

== Personal life ==
Winter is a Christian and his faith influenced him to co-operate on a movie based on the Left Behind series of books, although he left that project before it was completed.

== Filmography ==
- 1984 Star Trek III: The Search for Spock
- 1986 Star Trek IV: The Voyage Home
- 1989 Star Trek V: The Final Frontier
- 1991 Star Trek VI: The Undiscovered Country
- 1991 Plymouth
- 1992 Captain Ron
- 1993 Hocus Pocus
- 1994 The Puppet Masters
- 1995 Hackers
- 1996 High Incident
- 1998 Mighty Joe Young
- 1999 Inspector Gadget
- 2000 X-Men
- 2000 Left Behind: The Movie
- 2001 Planet of the Apes
- 2003 Blizzard
- 2003 X2
- 2005 Fantastic Four
- 2006 X-Men: The Last Stand
- 2006 The Visitation
- 2007 Fantastic Four: Rise of the Silver Surfer
- 2007 Three
- 2009 X-Men Origins: Wolverine
- 2010 In My Sleep
- 2010 Cool It
- 2015 Captive
- 2017 The Promise
- 2022 What Remains
- 2022 Hocus Pocus 2
