= Monster (Peretti novel) =

2006 novel by Frank E. Peretti

- Front cover of Monster
- Author: Frank E. Peretti
- Language: English
- Publisher: WestBow Press
- Publication date: October 31, 2006
- Pages: 427
- ISBN: 1595541217

Monster is a novel written in 2005 by Frank E. Peretti. It tells a story of a horrifying predator who terrorizes the woods of northern Idaho. The story deals with views on evolution, beneficial mutation, and natural selection.

== Plot summary ==
An unidentified man discovers a dead logger's body killed gruesomely by a deadly carnivore, he proceeds to cover it up by making it look like an accident. Reed Shelton, policeman and his introverted wife Rebecca Shelton are about to begin their vacation (something which Rebecca opposes). More and more sightings of a hairy, upright monster occur and Rebecca hears a shrieking in the night. Suddenly she is kidnapped by a large beast, Reed seeing her taken away.

Rebecca's captor proves to be a gentle giant however, a red colored female Bigfoot that lives in a small troop with her mate, an adult male, the male's other mate, and the other mate's offspring. Rebecca comes to call the male Jacob, the other female Leah, and the female who took her and seems especially maternal of her, Rachel. The bigfoot are powerful, but relatively peaceful animals skittish around humans and Rebecca comes to realize that rather than the source of the attacks or shrieks, they're actually running away from the true monster; a genetically engineered hybrid of a human and chimpanzee that had been driven insane by its condition. The reason Rachel abducted Rebecca was because the hybrid killed her offspring and the grieving mother mistook Rebecca for her baby based on their shared red color.

Eventually Rebecca manages to get away as the hybrid corners her after being wounded in a failed attack. It’s gunned down by its creator but the amoral scientist who tried to cover up his escaped monster's doings attempts to silence her by strangling her. Jacob intervenes and saves Rebecca's life, the scientist surrenders, and Rebecca exchanges a goodbye with Rachel as the bigfoot depart.

== Reception ==
Cindy Crosby in her review for Christianity Today said "what's missing here is the genuine keep-you-up-all-night suspense and fast pacing that made Peretti's earlier books, such as This Present Darkness, such page-turners. Peretti relies on passages like these--"Screams! Savage screeches! Howls!"—to frighten the reader, rather than creating an atmosphere of terror. The sheer volume of pages, improbable storyline, and prose troubles will disappoint readers of Peretti's earlier books."
John Mort in his review for Booklist said that Peretti was "better off writing about the weight of sin, as he did in The Oath."
Dean Moore in his review for Memphis Reads said that "Monster begins with a weekend camping trip that goes horribly wrong. It escalates in subplots, suspense, and yes, even horror as the very well woven plot evolves. As one might expect with Frank Peretti, it could be called a "gentle" horror tale. However, "gentle" in this case does not mean dull. Peretti brings considerable writing skill to this book. You will find it difficult to put down. ... This book should appeal to Bigfoot fans as well as outdoors enthusiasts. The book is fast paced, exciting and positive. It includes a sense of the unexpected from beginning to end."
