= WSMZ =

WSMZ may refer to:

- WSMZ (AM), a radio station (850 AM) licensed to serve Muskegon, Michigan, United States
- WSMZ-FM, a radio station (88.3 FM) licensed to serve Crystal Valley, Michigan
- WWLA (FM), a radio station (103.1 FM) licensed to serve Johnstown, Ohio, United States, which held the call sign WSMZ from 1996 to 2004
- WPRJ, a radio station (101.7 FM) licensed to serve Coleman, Michigan, which held the call sign WSMZ from 1988 to 1991
