= The Bunker (2001 film) =

2001 film by Rob Green

- UK DVD cover
- Directed by: Rob Green
- Written by: Clive Dawson
- Produced by: Daniel Figuero
- Starring: Jason Flemyng; Andrew Tiernan; Christopher Fairbank
- Cinematography: John Pardue
- Edited by: Richard Milward
- Music by: Russell Currie
- Production company: Millennium Pictures
- Distributed by: High Point Film and Television
- Release dates: 14 September 2001 (TIFF); 27 September 2002 (United Kingdom)
- Running time: 95 minutes
- Country: United Kingdom
- Language: English

The Bunker is a 2001 war horror film directed by Rob Green, written by Clive Dawson and starring Jason Flemyng.

== Plot ==
In late 1944, the remnants of a platoon of Panzergrenadiers are caught in an ambush by American troops. As they retreat, Private Hugo Engels is killed and the platoon finds a bunker occupied by Privates Heinrich Mirus (John Carlisle) and Michael Neumann (Andrew-Lee Potts) who have orders to defend it. Corporal Otto Schenke confronts Sergeant Theobald Heydrich about not counter-attacking. Mirus relates the history of the area, where victims of the Black Plague were massacred on the orders of a stranger who influenced the townspeople to turn against one another.

During the night, tunnels are discovered beneath the bunker. Corporal Schenke (Andrew Tiernan) wants to explore them but Lieutenant Hercule Krupp (Simon Kunz) refuses. Mirus sneaks into the tunnels and a curious Private First Class Wolfgang Kreuzmann (Eddie Marsan) follows him. When they are discovered missing, Krupp believes they've deserted and orders a pursuit. Neumann is caught and reveals that Mirus had been using the tunnels as private property for several weeks while concealing his specific activities in them. Corporal Bruno Baumann (Jason Flemyng) discovers plans for the complex while Corporal Tobias Ebert (Jack Davenport) finds a warning sign. Ebert also discovers a mine shaft where he is attacked from behind by a silhouetted figure resembling Kreuzmann.

Baumann concludes there are Americans in the tunnels, and uses a generator to turn lights on in the complex. Krupp asks Mirus to explain the mysterious activities but is interrupted by machine gun fire in the bunker. Rejoining the platoon, they discover they had been firing at nothing. Cut phone lines convince them Americans are in the tunnels. The platoon splits up and searches the complex. Mirus reveals his belief that his dead son is talking to him about the tunnels. Schenke and Krupp's search discovers Ebert's body. Another group discovers a mass grave and Kreuzmann is found catatonic and incoherent. Kreuzmann breaks away from the group and runs into Krupp and Schenke as they continue their exploration. Startled, Schenke and Krupp shoot him dead, in the process creating a collapse that kills Krupp.

The gunfire alerts Neumann who enters the tunnel and, running from a shadowy figure, joins Schenke. Mirus attempts to run away and becomes tangled in barbed wire. When Heydrich, Baumann and Helmut Franke try to blow the bunker door with a stick grenade, Schenke and Neumann mistake the noise for an American assault. They set the fuse to a demolition charge to blow the ammunition up and keep it from the Americans.

Heydrich, Baumann and Franke's attempt to open the door fails. While searching for another exit they meet Schenke and Neumann who open fire thinking the trio are Americans. The three are driven back after running out of ammunition. Neumann fires at the trio while Schenke kills Franke and then threatens Neumann. The ammunition detonates and Heydrich, Baumann and Neumann flee with Schenke firing at them. The trio find the main exit blocked, try to escape through the mine shaft, and fire at an approaching figure. When Heydrich shoots Schenke with his flare pistol, he bursts into flames. Neumann manages to break through the wall of the mass grave with his entrenching tool and into open air. Heydrich is stabbed by Schenke who survived the fire, and Baumann assaults Schenke with bare hands. Heydrich is killed during the altercation and Baumann escapes with Neumann, throwing a grenade into the grave with Schenke where it explodes.

Corporal Baumann gives Neumann permission to surrender to the Americans and he sets off, finding Mirus' body in the barbed wire. When he sees American soldiers, he waves a handkerchief to surrender.

The film cuts to a flashback in which Baumann's squad is marching through a field on a sunny day, coming upon a group of deserters about to be executed. Baumann is asked to participate in the firing party. Baumann shoots at a man who is praying, and misses before hitting him twice. An officer delivers the coup de grace and the firing party pose for photographs with the executed man.

Baumann's flashback ends and he staggers off to surrender to the Americans.

== Cast ==
- Jason Flemyng as Cpl. Bruno Baumann
- Andrew Tiernan as Cpl. Otto Schenke
- Christopher Fairbank as Sgt. Theobald Heydrich
- Simon Kunz as Lt. Hercule Krupp
- Andrew-Lee Potts as Pvt. Michael Neumann
- John Carlisle as Pvt. Heinrich Mirus
- Eddie Marsan as Pfc. Wolfgang Kreuzmann
- Jack Davenport as Cpl. Tobias Ebert
- Charley Boorman as Pfc. Helmut Franke
- Nicholas Hamnett as Pvt. Hugo Engels
- Iain McKee as Private
- Nick Rutherford as Deserter

== Release ==
The film was released on DVD by Film 2000 on 21 April 2003. It was re-released a year later by MTI Home Video.

== Reception ==
AllMovie gave the film a mixed review stating, "The Bunker is an admirable horror outing that comes close to delivering the shocks, but ends up on the drab side of things when all is said and done".
