= This Present Darkness =

1986 Christian novel by Frank E. Peretti

- First edition cover, 1986
- Author: Frank E. Peretti
- Language: English
- Genre: Christian fiction; Mystery; Horror
- Publisher: Crossway Books
- Publication date: 1986
- Publication place: United States

This Present Darkness is a Christian novel by suspense, horror, and fantasy author Frank E. Peretti. Published in 1986 by Crossway Books after first being rejected by fourteen publishing companies, This Present Darkness was Peretti's first published novel for adults and shows contemporary views on angels, demons, prayer, and spiritual warfare as demons and angels interact and struggle for control of the citizens of the small town of Ashton. It is critical of Eastern and New Age spiritual practices, portraying meditation as a means of demonic possession.

Sales were initially slow but jumped dramatically after singer Amy Grant promoted the book. The book has sold in excess of 2.7 million copies worldwide as of 2013 and remained on the Christian Booksellers Association top best-sellers list for over 150 consecutive weeks after its release. As of 2021, it continues to sell approximately 8,000 copies per year.

Its title comes from Ephesians 6:12 (RSV): "For we are not contending against flesh and blood, but against the principalities, against the powers, against the world rulers of this present darkness, against the spiritual hosts of wickedness in the heavenly places."

Peretti followed This Present Darkness up with a sequel in 1988, Piercing the Darkness.

== Plot summary ==
This Present Darkness takes place in the small college town of Ashton. Bernice Kreuger, a reporter for the Clarion, Ashton's town newspaper, is falsely arrested on prostitution charges after taking a photograph at the annual Ashton Summer Festival. When she is released the next day, she discovers that the film in her camera was destroyed.

Marshall Hogan, owner and editor-in-chief of the Clarion, decides to go to the town police station/courthouse and confront Alf Brummel, the police chief, about the incident. Brummel denies any wrongdoing on behalf of the police department and insists it was all a mistake. Brummel then advises Marshall to drop the matter. Marshall does not fall for Brummel's story and, ignoring Brummel's advice, begins an investigation.

As the investigation continues, Marshall and Bernice begin to realize that they are onto something much bigger than they thought. They slowly uncover a plot to take over the town by buying the college, which is being carried out by the Universal Consciousness Society, a powerful New Age group and "worldwide front organization for Satan." The college's psychology professor, Juleen Langstrat, is part of the Society. She teaches meditation, which brings practitioners in contact with spirit guides (demons), as well as witchcraft and New Age beliefs. Members of the community are thus influenced by Satan, including Brummel and the pastor of the liberal United Christian Church. When the Society decides Marshall has found out too much they take the Clarion, and his house. They also falsely accuse him of murder, adultery, and molesting his daughter, who attends the college and who unwittingly has been pulled into the Society. When he and Bernice are caught in a desperate attempt to keep society from winning out, he is arrested and thrown in jail, and she escapes, running off to find help.

Meanwhile, Hank Busche, the unwanted pastor of the little Ashton Community Church, discovers that there are many demons in the town and wonders why they have all congregated here. When he gets to be a nuisance to the demons, they have the Society falsely arrest him for rape.

Hank and Marshall meet in jail. They compare stories and finally put both halves of the puzzle together.

During the time that this is happening, the story takes on a spiritual dimension—revealing a perspective based on the idea of unseen forces at work. Lucius, the head demon, controls a group of demons including Ba-al Rafar, the Prince of Babylon, in battle against head angel Tal and his army. The angels who wage warfare for the souls of mankind look and act similarly to humans—they have names, they are in charge of specific regions of earth, and they are propelled by heavenly forces that often manifest as wings. They wear armor and wield weapons forged in heaven—most notably, swords. Demons, as well, are depicted as being ink-like shadows in the darkness, flowing from shadow to shadow, until the time comes when they truly reveal themselves as monstrous beasts with bat-wings and armor. Their spiritual combat spans from one-on-one battles to vast armies charging into each other in the "unseen realms" above.

Meanwhile, Bernice makes contact with the county prosecutor, the state attorney general, and federal authorities. When Alf Brummel learns that the authorities are becoming involved, he has Hank and Marshall released. At the same time, the Universal Consciousness Society summons a powerful demon to take control of Ashton. The new demon usurps the territory of the demon that already holds Ashton, provoking a conflict. As the factions of demons turn against one another, Hank and Marshall join forces against the Society and its efforts to take over Ashton. In the end, the Society's plans are thwarted, and the forces of good prevail.

== Critical reception and controversy ==
The novel has been the subject of both literary and theological criticism. On literary grounds, several reviewers such as Irving Hexham and James R. Lewis suggest that the novel fits into the genre of horror. Reviewers such as Steve Rabey and Michael Maudlin appreciate the novel's complex multi-layered plot. However, they find the novel's characters typecast in simplistic roles of good versus evil. Other criticisms raised concern about redundant passages in the novel, stilted dialogue, and poor grammar.

Christianity Today included the book on its list of "The Top 50 Books That Have Shaped Evangelicals" in 2006. Christianity Today has also stated the novel led the way for later Christian fiction such as the Left Behind novels.

The theme of sexual abuse allegations against the protagonists by women and children – because they are possessed by demons – has been mentioned by several reviewers. One reviewer describes it as "a terrible willingness to forgive child abuse and sexual assault if the accused was a powerful man and the accuser was a woman or child" mirrored in American evangelicalism, while another notes that not only are all of the "victims" depicted as "demonically-possessed liar[s]", but those in helping roles are also "villains": "Those who are on the frontline of helping children and survivors – public school teachers, therapists, social workers, child advocates – are cast as evil".

Contextualizing the acceptance of the QAnon movement, religion scholar Julie Ingersoll notes the "widely influential" role of This Present Darkness in "[illustrating] certain views of the world and certain expectations that lend themselves to the development of a sense of embattlement and a cultural crisis that can be interpreted in apocalyptic terms." Likewise, University of Notre Dame scholar Jason Springs connects the messianic beliefs of QAnon to "the same culture previously captivated and emboldened" by Peretti's spiritual warfare-themed novels.

The New Consciousness Society described in the book has been described as a "spiritual conspiracy to establish a New World Order".
