= The Visitation (novel) =

1999 contemporary Christian novel by Frank Peretti

- Front cover of The Visitation
- Author: Frank Peretti
- Language: English
- Publication date: 1999

The Visitation is a 1999 contemporary Christian novel by Frank Peretti. Taking place in the fictional wheat town of Antioch, located in eastern Washington, The Visitation is told in first-person narrative by the protagonist, a former minister named Travis Jordan who struggles to reconcile his former pastoral life with that of a present-day false Messiah.

== Plot summary ==
Centered on the life of Travis Jordan, The Visitation begins when miracles, ranging from a healing, weeping crucifix to sights of Jesus in the clouds, start occurring, giving way to the arrival of a man who calls himself Brandon Nichols. Nichols begins healing people; giving a man who lost the use of his legs in the Vietnam War the ability to walk, and performing various other "healings". Most of the townspeople — who are portrayed as disillusioned, post-Pentecostal farmers — begin to believe in Nichols as a Messiah.

Brandon Nichols begins to hold "revival meetings" on a large ranch outside of town every Sunday, and many churchgoers in town stop going to Sunday morning mass/services and instead listen to Brandon talk and watch him "heal". It is at this point that Nichols arouses the ire of one of the local ministers, Kyle Sherman. Enlisting the help of Travis Jordan, he seeks to prove that the so-called Brandon Nichols is not in fact a "better" Christian Messiah, but a puffed-up egomaniac using occult powers.

In the end, the team (along with the help of a few others) uncover a host of pseudonyms and a hefty helping of deception surrounding Nichols' past.

== Film Adaptation ==
A film based on The Visitation has been released by Twentieth Century Fox and stars Martin Donovan and Edward Furlong.
