= Ed Silvoso =

Argentine evangelist

- Born: June 15, 1945 (age 80); San Nicolás de los Arroyos, Argentina
- Occupations: Author, social entrepreneur, evangelist
- Known for: Harvest Evangelism; International Transformation Network

Ed Silvoso (born June 15, 1945) is an Argentine evangelist, author, social entrepreneur, and documentarian. He founded Harvest Evangelism and the Transform Our World Network, the objective of which is to end worldwide systemic poverty in its four expressions. Silvoso is an acknowledged leader of the Argentine revival in the 1990s, and a formative figure in the modern transformation movement. Silvoso has hosted annual global conferences, participated in symposiums, provided leadership summits on transformation since 1990, developed leadership training, and appeared in the media. He has published seven books and produced a documentary library of over forty titles.

== Early life ==
Ed Silvoso was born at San Nicolás de los Arroyos, Argentina. He formed an evangelistic team at the age of seventeen when the country was intensely anti-evangelical. He graduated from Colegio Nacional Justo Jose de Urquiza in 1962; seven years later he became a pastor in Mar del Plata, Argentina. Silvoso married Ruth Noemi Palau, the sister of evangelist Luis Palau, on April 20, 1968, and they have four daughters.

He attended Multnomah Bible College in Portland, Oregon, and later moved to Pasadena, California, to continue his studies at Fuller Seminary. Silvoso began working with Luis Palau as part of Overseas Crusades in 1970 as coordinator for International Mass Media Evangelism (1970–1976). He was full-time with Palau's evangelistic team (1977–1980) before founding Harvest Evangelism.

== Career ==
He established Harvest Evangelism at San Jose, California, in 1980; it is now known as Transform Our World (TOW). The ministry pioneered city transformation in Resistencia, Argentina.

The same approach was applied to more than three hundred cities, and it expanded to six continents. Silvoso began to host international conferences that promoted local, regional, and national change through ecumenical ministry. He was a pioneer in the spiritual mapping movement beginning in the mid-1980s, in which adherents map out the spiritual history and social factors of a region to determine the demon (territorial spirit) controlling it and preventing evangelism, in order to defeat it through prayer. He and a number of other pastors at a Harvest Evangelism conference noted a lack of Evangelical churches in an area of Argentina, and determining it was caused by a demon controlling the area through a local warlock, used spiritual warfare methods to "take back" the area for God. He would then go on to organize Plan Resistencia, a testing ground for the new spiritual mapping methods, which "brought together into one system notions such as spiritual warfare, evangelism, territorial spirits, breaking and binding of spirits, identificational repentance, Spiritual Mapping, prayer marches and newly developed strategic-level spiritual warfare terms".

The lessons learned from Silvoso's community transformation efforts were shared in his first book, That None Should Perish: How to Reach Entire Cities for Christ through Prayer Evangelism (1994). The concepts in this volume inspired the Transform Our World Network, a voluntary association that creates alliances between local marketplaces and various faith-based assemblies.

Members are challenged to invest their resources to help eradicate systemic poverty in its four aspects. This theme is broadened in Prayer Evangelism: How to Change the Spiritual Climate Over Your Home, Neighborhood and City (2000) and Anointed for Business (2002). Five paradigms are at the core of TOW, and they involve changes in spiritual climate, public policies, and ecclesiastical institutions.

Thousands in the United States have observed Silvoso's methodology over the past thirty years, both clergy and laity. As a result, they have adopted his approach to transformation, a process that affects the marketplace as well as the church.

== Books ==
- That None Should Perish: How to Reach Entire Cities for Christ Through Prayer Evangelism. Ventura, CA: Regal Press, 1994. ISBN 0-8307-1688-2
- Prayer Evangelism: How to Change the Spiritual Climate Over Your Home, Neighborhood and City. Ventura, CA: Regal Press, 2000. ISBN 0-8307-2397-8
- Women: God's Secret Weapon: God's Inspiring Message to Women of Power, Purpose and Destiny. Ventura, CA: Regal Press, 2001. ISBN 0-8307-2887-2
- Anointed for Business. Ventura, CA: Regal Press, 2002. ISBN 0-8307-2861-9
- Transformation: Change the Marketplace and You Change the World. Ventura, CA: Regal Press, 2007. ISBN 978-0-8307-4514-2
- Ekklesia: Rediscovering God's Instrument for Global Transformation. Bloomington, MN: Chosen Books, 2017. ISBN 978-0-8007-9856-7
- Anointed for Romance: Igniting Intimacy that Lasts a Lifetime. Legacy Coalition, 2025. ISBN 979-8350732474
