= Thomas Muthee =

Kenyan preacher and bishop

Thomas Muthee (born c. 1955) is a Kenyan preacher, bishop, and self-professed witch hunter. He became internationally known when in 2008, it was reported that United States vice presidential candidate Sarah Palin had financed his work after seeing a video of his claims of successful use of spiritual mapping to identify and persecute a woman for witchcraft. After seeing the video, Palin invited Muthee to Alaska, where he gave her a blessing when she ran for governor, prior to her vice presidential run. Muthee has spoken to churches in multiple European countries and does work in Africa. He has been described as an apostle in the New Apostolic Reformation movement and a dominionist.

== Background ==
The original church is also known as the "Prayer Cave" because meetings were originally held in a grocery basement. Muthee's late wife, Margaret Muthee, was a teacher, and they had two children: Joshua and Ann. Joshua, a student at Sacramento State University in Sacramento, CA, resides with a pastor of his father's local financial supporter, Radiant Life Church. As of 2008, Thomas served as the East African director of the International Spiritual Warfare Network.

== Mama Jane ==
Muthee and his wife returned home to Kenya from Scotland, where he had finished his graduate studies, in 1988. They soon felt that they were "called by God to Kiambu" and after six months of prayer, research, and spiritual mapping, they came to believe that a woman known as "Mama Jane" was a witch, and thereby caused traffic fatalities, traffic accidents, crime, and spiritual oppression in the area. Muthee alleged that "top government and business leaders [were] afraid to do anything without her approval," that at least one person per month would die in a car accident in front of her "divination house" and that she weekly "went to Thomas' church site, performed magic, and cast her spells and curses."

Muthee publicly declared, "Mama Jane either gets saved and serves the Lord, or she leaves town! There is no longer room in Kiambu for both of us!" Soon after his followers began to pray that God would either save or oust Mama Jane, three young people died in another apparent accident in front of Mama Jane's house, according to Muthee's account.

Angry townsfolk wanted to stone Mama Jane in retaliation for the traffic accidents. When the police entered Mama Jane's home to intervene, they were allegedly startled by what they believed to be a demon and shot her pet python dead. Mama Jane was then questioned by police, after which she left town.

Muthee has frequently referred to the Mama Jane event as an example of successful "spiritual mapping," which includes locating specific witches by research and prayer, and spiritual warfare, claiming that crime and traffic accidents were reduced as a result of chasing Mama Jane out of town. Others have referred to the event as an example of the power of prayer. The event was depicted in two videos by George Otis, Jr., Transformations and The Quickening, in which Muthee claimed that the crime and traffic accident rate in Kiambu dropped drastically after Mama Jane left, and that he is responsible for positive social change in the town. Transformations, produced by missionary and writer on spiritual warfare C. Peter Wagner, prominently featured Muthee and would start his career.

Workgroup "Back to the Bible," headed by Pastor Rien van de Kraats of Kamperland, Netherlands, found no police reports or any other sources that backed up Muthee's claims. Investigators have asserted that "Mama Jane" is Jane Njenga, a local pastor who never left Kiambu.

== Wasilla Assembly of God ==
Bishop Muthee visited the Wasilla Assembly of God in 2005, delivering several guest sermons. During one sermon, Muthee covered seven areas of society that he said Christians should control, including the economic area:

The Bible says that the wealth of the wicked is stored up for the righteous. It is high time that we have top Christian businessmen, businesswomen, bankers, you know, who are men and women of integrity, running the economics of our nations. That's what we are waiting for. That's part and parcel of transformation. If you look at the Israelites, you know, that's how they won. And that's how they are, even today. When we will see that, you know, the talk transport us in the lands. We see, you know, the bankers. We see the people holding the paths. They are believers. We will not have the kind of corruption that we are hearing in our societies.

There has been debate over the meaning of his comments, with some interpreting them to be antisemitic, while others believe that Muthee sees Jews as role models for Christians.

Muthee also said that he believed that Christians should influence education, stating, "If we have that in our schools we will not have kids being taught how to worship Buddha, how to worship (Prophet) Mohammed. We will not have in the curriculum, witchcraft and sorcery."

During the same sermon, Muthee prayed over Sarah Palin, who was then campaigning for Alaska governor, asking God to "bring finances her way even for the campaign in the name of Jesus... Use her to turn this nation the other way around and to keep her safe from every form of witchcraft." When Palin spoke to missionaries at the church in June 2008, she referenced the blessing, saying, "Pastor Muthee was here and he was praying over me, and you know how he speaks and he's so bold. And he was praying 'Lord make a way, Lord make a way'... He said, 'Lord make a way and let her do this next step.' And that's exactly what happened."

On September 25, 2008, during the United States presidential election, an Associated Press article on the blessing was published in international news. Some sources compared the story to the Jeremiah Wright controversy. The Boston Herald described it as "all smoke and no fire," pointing out that some religious experts believed that, in light of Muthee's cultural background, there was nothing strange about the prayer.

Muthee returned to the Wasilla church as a guest speaker for the weekend of September 20–22, 2008. He spoke there again in October 2010, with video footage available on the church's website.

== Other appearances and projects ==
Muthee has traveled extensively as an international guest speaker and pastor. in December 2002, he and his wife were guest speakers of a Greenville, Pennsylvania church. In April 2004, Muthee delivered two sermons as a guest pastor at the Kingsgate Community Church in the United Kingdom, recorded and posted on its website. In May 2004, Muthee reprised his role as a guest speaker at an international prayer conference organized by the International Christian Chamber of Commerce in Örebro, Sweden.

In 2008, Muthee was a speaker at the Exchange Africa-Australia Summit. Bishop Muthee has a "strategic partnership" with Yarra Plenty Church of Victoria, Australia, with an October 2008 sermon by Muthee available on their website.

Churches in Finland have donated funds to Muthee's congregation to build and support projects including a vocational center to provide training in tailoring, dressmaking, and fashion design; hairdressing and beauty therapy; computer studies; catering; plumbing; motor vehicle mechanics; and welding and metal works. As of June 2009, Word of Faith Community College has been completed and is training students in some of the planned professions. The computer studies program has been accredited by the Computer Society of Kenya.

Beginning in January 2008, the Word of Faith Church in Limuru cooperated with the Kenya Red Cross and UNICEF to house internally displaced persons. Kenya's Daily Nation reported in October 2008 that some families were still being sheltered there.

Members of the children's ministry group Kids Works International visited Muthee's congregation in late 2008.

Muthee's ventures since then include plans to provide a pastor for the Maasai in Kenya as part of a project with Eagle Rock Covenant Network to help the tribe dig a well and build a village. Muthee was also involved with Restoration Alliance in providing potable water to Kenya. Restoration Alliance is affiliated with Radiant Life Church in Sacramento where Thomas Muthee has been a frequent speaker and personal friend of Pastor Tony Cunningham.
