= Robby Henson =

American director and screenwriter

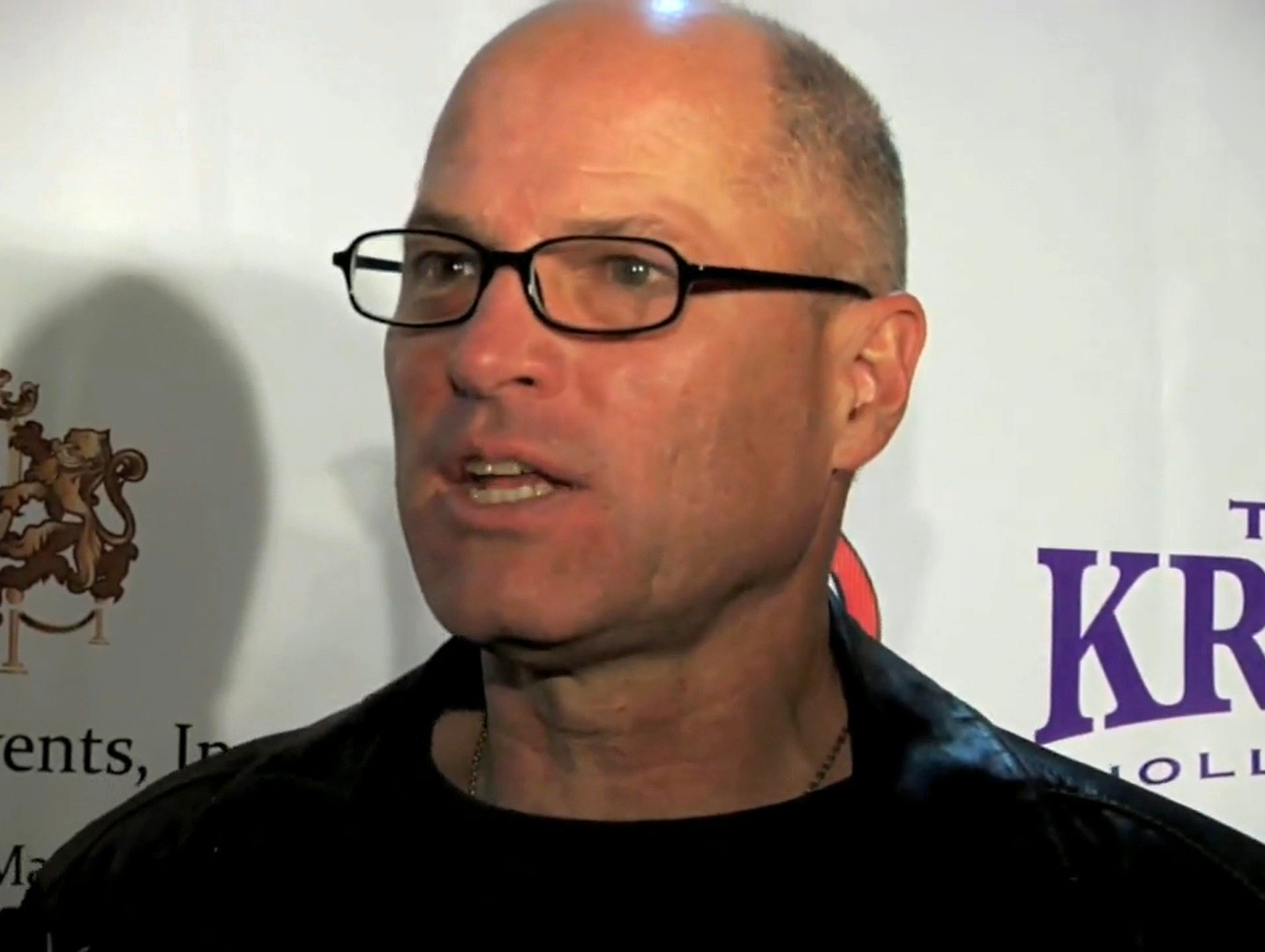
- Henson in 2009
- Born: January 18, 1958 (age 68); Kentucky, U.S.
- Education: Tisch School of the Arts at New York University
- Occupations: Film producer, film director, screenwriter
- Parents: Col. Eben C. Henson founder of Pioneer Playhouse located in Danville, Kentucky (father); Charlotte (mother)
- Relatives: Heather Henson (sister), Eben French Mastin (cousin)

Robby Henson is an American director and screenwriter.

== Biography ==
Robby Henson began his directing career at Tisch School of the Arts at New York University. Henson is now a skilled film and documentary maker. He writes and directs all his films, which are known for being character-driven. His work has attracted such acclaimed actors Billy Bob Thornton, Patricia Arquette, Patricia Clarkson, Chris Cooper, William Devane and Kris Kristofferson. Beyond his work in film, Henson is also a prolific theater director, his family owning the famous outdoor theater, "Pioneer Playhouse" in Danville, Kentucky.

== Filmography ==
- House (2007)
- Thr3e (2006)
- The Visitation (2006)
- The Badge (2002)
- Ghost Stories episode 28 (1997)
- Exodus 1947 (1997)
- Pharaoh's Army (1995)
- Trouble Behind (1991) a film about the Corbin, Kentucky race riot of 1919
