= Kurt E. Koch =

German theologian (1913-1987)

Kurt E. Koch (16 November 1913 – 25 January 1987) was a German Protestant theologian and writer from Berghausen, Pfinztal. He was best known for his publications on the occult.

== Life ==
After studying Protestant theology, Koch obtained a doctorate in theology from the University of Tübingen. He then became a pastor at the service of the Protestant Church in Baden. His functions were mainly working with young people and evangelism.

He also began writing books in the year 1949. That same year, Koch founded a mission to distribute the Bible and evangelistic writings around the world for free. Over the following years, his missionary and evangelistic work led him to more than 100 countries, where he held lectures at universities, seminaries, Bible schools and many churches on every continent.

== Writing and theology ==
The main themes of his work and books were: the decision to live one's life for Christ, pastoral care in relation to the occult, information about demonic spirits, the various areas of revival of the earth, the work of the Holy Spirit and the return of Jesus.

Some of his books were published under the pseudonyms Klaus Becker, Carol Córnea, Peter Diestel, Kasimir Kucharski, Marc Marot, and René Monod.

Koch was convinced of the existence of witchcraft and black magic that competed in a fight against "the good" for terrestrial supremacy.

== Publishing company ==
Koch founded his own publishing company to distribute his writings called "Bibel- und Schriftenmission Dr. Kurt E. Koch". It is the leading distributor of his materials in Lindach, Germany.

== Publications (selection) ==
- Jesus Heals, Evangelization Publishers, 5th edition 1962
- Heinrich Coerper and his Work, Liebenzeller Mission, Bad Liebenzell/Württemberg 1964
- The Revival in Indonesia, Evangelization Publishers, 1970 ISBN 978-0-82543-007-7
- Occult ABC, Bible and Scripture Mission Dr. Kurt E. Koch eV, 4th edition 1996
- Christian Counseling and Occultism, 26th edition, Brunnen-Verlag, Basel/Gießen, 1985 ISBN 3-924293-18-X
- Possession and Exorcism, 1st edition, Bible and Mission Scriptures, 1992, ISBN 978-0-88981-028-0
- The Devils Alphabet, First American Printing 1971, Kregel Publications, ISBN 0-8254-3004-6
- Occult bondage and deliverance, Evangelization Publishers, 1970 ISBN 0-8254-3006-2

== Literature ==
- Helmuth Pfandl. With Jesus around the world to work in the life of Kurt E. Koch Evangelization Publishers, Laval Canada, 1983 ISBN 0-88981-016-8

== See also ==
- Spiritual warfare
