= Three (2007 film) =

- DVD cover
- Directed by: Robby Henson
- Screenplay by: Alan B. McElroy
- Based on: Three by Ted Dekker
- Produced by: Joe Goodman; Bobby Neutz; Ralph Winter
- Starring: Marc Blucas; Justine Waddell; Laura Jordan; Bill Moseley; Priscilla Barnes; Kevin Downes
- Cinematography: Sebastian Miłaszewski
- Edited by: Anuree De Silva
- Music by: David Bergeaud
- Production companies: Namesake Entertainment; MovieRoom Productions
- Distributed by: The Bigger Picture; FoxFaith
- Release date: January 5, 2007 (US)
- Running time: 101 minutes
- Country: United States
- Language: English
- Budget: $2.4 million
- Box office: $1.4 million

Three (sometimes stylized Thr3e) is a 2007 Christian horror thriller film adaptation of the novel of the same name by Ted Dekker. Directed by Robby Henson and written by Alan B. McElroy, the film stars Marc Blucas, Justine Waddell, Max Ryan, and Bill Moseley. It was shot on location in Łódź and Warsaw, Poland. The film grossed $1.4 million and received negative reviews.

== Plot ==
Jennifer Peters attempts to save her brother Roy, who has been abducted by a serial killer known as the Riddle Killer (R.K.) due to his use of riddles in the murders he commits. Jennifer follows R.K.'s clues and finds Roy but fails to save him as the car in which he is trapped explodes.

Kevin Parson receives a phone call from R.K., ordering him to confess some unspecified sin or his car will explode. Kevin escapes from the car before it explodes. He informs the police, among them Jennifer, but leaves out the part about the sin. He receives a threat against his childhood dog and goes to the house of his Aunt Balinda but fails to save his dog from a bomb. He and his friend since childhood, Samantha Sheer, decide to try to figure out the mystery of the Riddle Killer. Sam solves the first riddle.

Another threat comes from the Riddle Killer: A bomb is attached to Kevin's fellow student Henry and a message on Henry's forehead points to a Biblical text about death as the wages of sin. The police manage to get the bomb off Henry's body. Kevin now remembers a boy who had always watched him and Sam during their childhood. Kevin had locked him in a warehouse and left him to die. He thinks that the boy escaped, and is now R.K. Later, Kevin finds a TV in his refrigerator which shows R.K. with another riddle. Kevin confesses leaving the boy in the warehouse and apologizes, but R.K. does not relent. Kevin and Sam find out that a bus is in danger and manage to get all the passengers off safely before a bomb explodes.

Jennifer finds a bloody jacket in the warehouse. Meanwhile, Sam talks with Kevin in a hotel. R.K. sends a recorded message to the hotel room which points to the warehouse. Before Jennifer gets to the hotel, Kevin and Sam are at the warehouse, where Sam is trapped by the killer. When Kevin enters the building, he finds a bomb. He is unable to stop it but can escape with Sam. Jennifer and the police arrive and investigate. Sam leaves and Kevin insists on not cooperating with Jennifer, as the killer insisted on no police involvement, or he'd kill more people. Jennifer declares her resignation, saying that as she is no longer officially involved, she no longer counts. However, Kevin ignores her.

Kevin finds another threat about a house on fire at midnight and realizes that Aunt Balinda is in danger. As he rushes to try to save her, he remembers that she abused him when he was a child. Sam finds a note from R.K. and is startled to realize that he has the same handwriting as Kevin. She calls Jennifer, who tells her that there was only one pair of footprints in the warehouse. The women conclude that R.K. might actually be Kevin's "evil half."

Kevin finds Balinda tied up, and the Riddle Killer introduces himself as Slater. Slater explains that he will have Kevin kill Balinda, then leave him to take the blame, as everyone will believe Kevin is the Riddle Killer. Jennifer arrives to find Kevin pointing a gun at himself. It turns out that both Slater and Sam are figments of Kevin's imagination; traumatized by Aunt Balinda's abuse, Kevin had imagined his friend Samantha and the boy with whom he had fought and had subconsciously imitated the real Riddle Killer. Jennifer convinces Kevin of this, and his visions of Slater and Sam vanish.

Kevin had said that the real Riddle Killer was right in front of their eyes, and Jennifer discovers while examining his wall of clippings that the hot dog vendor who had supposedly been given a book by the killer to give to her is at the front of the crowd in a photo, holding a camera. When captured, he confesses that he hates copycats and had meant to kill Kevin for copying him.

Kevin is sent to an institution and Jennifer visits him there.

== Cast ==
Actor	Role
Marc Blucas	Kevin Parson
Justine Waddell	Jennifer Peters
Laura Jordan	Samantha Sheer
Bill Moseley	Richard Slater
Priscilla Barnes	Balinda Parson
Max Ryan	Paul Milton
Tom Bower	Eugene Parson
Jeffrey Lee Hollis	Bob Parson
Alanna Bale	Young Samantha
Kevin Downes	Henry

== Critical reception ==
Rotten Tomatoes, a review aggregator, reports that 5% of 38 surveyed critics gave the film a positive review; the average rating is 3.6/10. The sites' consensus reads: "Thr3e is a shoddily made, thrill-free thriller that isn't half as good as the several movies it borrows from (Adaptation, Saw, Se7en)." The film also has a noticeable resemblance to the plot of a film script created by the character Donald Kaufman in the film Adaptation.

Rotten Tomatoes ranked Thr3e #84 on its "The 100 Worst Reviewed Films of All Time: 2000–2009" list.

== Box office ==
Three opened in just over 450 theaters and grossed $700,000 in its first weekend. It officially left the box office 17 days after it opened and grossed just over $1 million.
