= Pharaoh's Army =

- Original theatrical poster
- Directed by: Robby Henson
- Written by: Robby Henson
- Produced by: Robby Henson
- Starring: Chris Cooper; Patricia Clarkson; Kris Kristofferson
- Cinematography: Doron Schlair
- Edited by: Robby Henson
- Music by: Vince Emmett
- Distributed by: Cinépix Film Properties
- Release date: November 9, 1995
- Running time: 90 minutes
- Country: United States
- Language: English
- Budget: $500,000

Pharaoh's Army is a 1995 American Western film directed, written and produced by Robby Henson, starring Chris Cooper, Patricia Clarkson and Kris Kristofferson. The film takes place in southeastern Kentucky during the American Civil War and focuses on an uneasy encounter involving a small squadron of Union Army soldiers who take up residence at the farm of a woman whose husband is fighting in the Confederate States Army.

== Plot ==
The story is narrated by an unnamed boy, now an old man, 'as best as he can remember'. In the spring of 1862, in the Cumberland Mountains 'down near the Tennessee line', war sympathies were strongly divided, neighbors against neighbors.

After the unexplained death of Sarah Anders' (Clarkson) daughter at the hand of Yankees (Union Army), the body is buried in Altamira. That night it is dug up from the grave and unceremoniously left exposed by Yankees, to add insult to Sarah's loss. Her husband they call 'Pap' is away fighting for the Confederacy in the Tennessee Army, and fought at the Battle of Shiloh. Sarah also has an 11-year old son, the boy. Sarah takes her daughter's body (in coffin) back to her homestead at the end of Mershack Creek, Kentucky to rebury.

Captain John Hull Abston (Cooper) is a Union army officer, widower, and a farmer before the war, from Brown County, Ohio. He commands a party of four soldiers scavenging for supplies: Corporal Neely, Rodie, a pole called Chicago, and Newt, the youngest. All are untested in battle. They arrive at Sarah's small cabin and take what little they can find. Just before leaving, Newt is seriously wounded falling from a ladder, and the party has to stay there until the soldier is well enough to travel.

Sarah and the boy suffer the company of the raiding party for several days, but are not seriously harassed by them. In fact, the Captain takes pity on Sarah, and as they wait around, he even assists her in plowing a small patch of land to plant a corn crop, as 'he likes to work with mules'.

The boy sneaks away one night to advise nearby neighbor Preacher (Kristofferson), a minister and Confederate sympathizer, of their situation. The preacher says 'Pharaoh sent his armies to smite Israel, and they drowned in the Red Sea'.

The next day Roadie argues with Captain Abston and, disgusted by the situation, rides off to desert. The captain aims to shoot him, but just then, sniper fire rings out, killing the deserter. All take refuge in the cabin. Sarah and the boy think it's his Pap doing the shooting. The captain chases and kills the sniper in the creek, and all discover it is not Sarah's husband. Later, Preacher comes to retrieve the sniper's body, as it is his Israel, his colored servant.

The captain buries the dead soldier next to Sarah's daughter's grave, which enrages Sarah and she becomes insanely distressed. The raiding party leaves, taking Sarah's wagon, mule and cow, but the captain leaves Sarah a rifle 'for the boy to shoot squirrels'. She attempts to shoot the captain as he rides away, but the rifle is empty. When they are out of sight, Sarah digs up the soldier, as the boy, after fetching a revolver he had earlier stolen from the party, runs after the raiders. The boy catches up to the party and shoots Newt, lying in the wagon, dead, and then flees; the captain pursues him, firing after him.

Captain Abston returns to the cabin with Newt's body in the wagon, and the mule, looking for the boy. The captain chastises the boy for killing the young soldier, and Sarah and the captain argue. The captain, frustrated, threatens to kill them, and Sarah, frustrated, says "Go ahead. Kill us." The upset captain fires two rounds into the air, asks that the dead soldier be provided a decent Christian burial, then returns to the other two of his party. They ask "What'd you do to 'em?", and he replies, "You heard the shots." They continue on their way.

Because 'the Civil War was not about 'being decent,' Sarah and the boy throw Rodie's body into the creek, to wash downstream 'where he came from'. They dump the body of Newt into a sinkhole by the roots of a fallen sycamore, and throw some dirt on it. Sarah's husband never did return.

Epilogue text reads 'In 1941 a Kentucky mountaineer returned to a remote sinkhole, the place when during the Civil War he had killed and buried a Union soldier. This film was inspired by his story as told to folklorist Harry M. Caudill.'

== Cast ==
- Kris Kristofferson as Confederate Preacher
- Patricia Clarkson as Sarah Anders, a Confederate homesteader
- Will Lucas as the Boy - Sarah's son
- Robert Sampson as The Narrator, the Boy grown old
- Chris Cooper as Captain John Hull Abston, a Union officer from Brown County, Ohio
- Frank Clem as Corporal Neely, a Union soldier
- Richard Tyson as Rodie, a disgruntled Union soldier
- Robert Joy as Chicago, a Union soldier originally from a small town in Poland
- Huckleberry Fox as Newt, young injured Union soldier
- Mac Miles as Israel, a black servant to Preacher
- Maude Mitchell as Preacher's Wife
- And 7 uncredited Mourners

== Production ==
The title is taken from Preacher alluding to the boy the story from the Old Testament, about pharaoh's army (the North) being sent to smite Israel (the South), and how it was destroyed.

According to director/producer/writer Robby Henson, Pharaoh's Army was inspired by Shelby Foote's books about the war between the North and South, and 'is based on a true story.'

Kristofferson, who appears in just a few scenes, was the only 'big name' star at the time. His daughter Tracy acted as associate producer, and got him involved in the project.
