= The Visitation (film) =

- Directed by: Robby Henson
- Written by: Frank Peretti (novel); Brian Godawa
- Produced by: Bobby Downes; Kevin Downes; Jerry Rose; Joe Goodman; Bobby Neutz; Ralph Winter
- Starring: Martin Donovan; Edward Furlong; Kelly Lynch; Priscilla Barnes; Randy Travis
- Cinematography: Glynn Speeckaert
- Edited by: Jeffrey Lee Hollis
- Music by: David Bergeaud
- Production companies: Namesake Entertrainment; Total Living Network; Signal Hill Pictures
- Distributed by: 20th Century Fox Film Corporation (United States, Theatrical)
- Release dates: February 15, 2006 (Spain); February 24, 2006 (United States)
- Running time: 103 minutes
- Country: United States
- Language: English

The Visitation is a 2006 American supernatural thriller/horror film directed by Robby Henson and starring Kelly Lynch, Edward Furlong, Priscilla Barnes and Martin Donovan. It was based on the 1999 novel The Visitation by Frank Peretti.

== Plot ==
Former minister Travis Jordan lives in Antioch, Washington, three years after losing his faith in God when his beloved wife was murdered and the criminals never found.

Suddenly, miracles happen in the little town: the new veterinarian's son survives an accident whilst in a van without one single scratch, Travis's dog Max revives after being buried, a paraplegic walks, and a scarred teenager and her police officer father (who has a brain tumor) heal.

In all these events, witnesses see either a group of three men wearing black nearby or their tall, (possibly) blond leader, who seems to want everyone to know that “he is coming”. Soon after, a scruffy, gentle-mannered newcomer named Brandon Nichols arrives. He implies through his healing work and preaching that he is Jesus Christ or the better version of the messiah.

The local population soon worships Brandon, while Travis and Morgan feel that something is wrong and conduct an investigation, disclosing that evil has possessed the town dwellers.

== Cast ==
- Martin Donovan as Travis Jordan
- Edward Furlong as Brandon Nichols
- Kelly Lynch as Morgan Elliot
- Randy Travis as Kyle Sherman
- Richard Tyson as Sheriff Brett Henchle
- Ellen Geer as Mrs. Macon
- Joe Unger as Matt Kiley
- Priscilla Barnes as Dee Henchle
- Noah Segan as Michael Elliot
- Lew Temple as Deputy Tommy Smalls
- Hillary Tuck as Darlene Henchle
- Lin Ciangio as Nancy Barrons
- Frank Clem as Nevin Sorrell
- Don Swayze as Abe
- Ruben Moreno as Arnold Kowalski
- Clement Blake as Norman Dillard
- Joe Goodman as Doctor
- David A. R. White as Carl
- Debi Kalman as Delores (the waitress)
- Brian Foster Kane as Tall Man One
- Ron Hughart as Tall Man Two
- Jerry Rose as Lutheran Pastor
- Wendell Wright as Baptist Preacher
- Jesse Corti as Catholic Priest
- Jhey Castles as Marian Jordan
- Dwight Cenac II as Punk Kid
- Joshua Popke as Young Justin
- Jill Ludlow as Social Worker
- Lee Chapa as Follower
- Torey Foster as Punk Kid
- Chantay Nieber as Voice
- Robert Lyon Rasner as Voice
- Mark Rickard as Voice
- Lisa Cash as Voice (uncredited)
- James Horan as Tall Man
