= Prophet (novel) =

First edition (publ. Crossway Books) Cover art by David Yorke

Prophet is a Christian novel by Frank E. Peretti published in 1992. It tells the story about how the media covers the abortion issue.

== Premise ==
The main character in "Prophet" is John Barrett, a television news anchor. Upon his anti-abortion father's accidental death, he is encouraged to investigate and report on problems at an abortion clinic. This only comes about after John catches his producer attempting to fabricate a story. Soon his colleagues are begging to stop him from finding out more, and he begins to hear mysterious and scary "voices". As John Barrett goes through the abortion investigation with Leslie Albright, he soon finds God and Truth, along the way.

== Characters ==
- John Barrett- Main character of the book and a local news anchor.
- Carl Barrett- the estranged son of John who returns to learn more about his grandfather (the Prophet)

== Reception ==
The Oklahoman gave the book a positive review, saying "What makes this book work so well is pacing, literary skill, and believability. At the front of the text, Peretti acknowledges the assistance of several broadcast and print journalists who took him inside their daily reality of competitive pressures, deadlines and hurried choices."
