= House (2008 film) =

- Theatrical release poster
- Directed by: Robby Henson
- Screenplay by: Rob Green
- Based on: House by Ted Dekker; Frank E. Peretti
- Produced by: Joe Goodman; Bobby Neutz; Michael Webber; Ralph Winter
- Starring: Michael Madsen; Reynaldo Rosales; Heidi Dippold; Julie Ann Emery; J.P. Davis; Leslie Easterbrook; Lew Temple; Bill Moseley
- Cinematography: Marcin Koszałka
- Edited by: Andrea Bottigliero
- Music by: David E. Russo
- Distributed by: Roadside Attractions
- Release date: November 7, 2008
- Running time: 88 minutes
- Countries: Poland; United States
- Language: English

House is a 2008 horror film directed by Robby Henson, starring Reynaldo Rosales, Heidi Dippold and Michael Madsen. It is based on the novel of the same name by Frank E. Peretti and Ted Dekker. It covers the events that take place one night in an old, rustic inn in Alabama, where four guests and three owners find themselves locked in by a homicidal maniac known as the Tin Man. The maniac claims to have killed God and threatens to murder all seven of them, unless they produce the dead body of one of them by dawn.

== Plot ==
In the prologue, the film depicts a panicky man who, for unknown reasons, murders his wife with a shotgun. The main storyline opens with Jack and Stephanie, a bickering young couple, who are lost while driving through the backwoods. We soon learn that they are on their way to meet a marriage counsellor.

After getting bad directions from a state trooper, the couple get into a car accident when they run over some spiked metal in the road, which Jack dismisses as discarded scrap metal; they find another car which has experienced the same fate, but the occupants are missing. Forced to proceed on foot, Jack and Stephanie find the gothic Wayside Inn, where they try to phone for help. At the inn, they meet the occupants of the other car, the engaged couple Leslie and Randy. Because the phones are inoperative, both couples are forced to spend the night at the inn, which is staffed only by the eccentric proprietor Betty, her creepy son Pete (who develops an instant attraction for Leslie), and the gruff caretaker Stewart.

After a tense dinner, in which personalities clash, the group is terrorized by a legendary local figure, the Tin Man. Armed with a shotgun, the Tin Man attempts to get into the Wayside Inn. The staff locks the Tin Man out, and he responds by giving them a message scrawled on the side of a tin can. The message declares that he will kill everyone in the house unless they give him one dead body by sunrise. The staff, blaming their guests for attracting the Tin Man's attention, attempts to lock them in the freezing meat locker, threatening to leave them there for weeks. A fight ensues, and the guests realize that there is a supernatural presence in the house when Betty is injured in the struggle and bleeds black fog.

The couples escape the meat locker, but are unable to leave the house, which assaults them with terrifying visions involving their worst memories. For Jack and Stephanie, the visions involve their daughter, who died after falling through the ice in a skating accident. For Randy, the visions involve his abusive father. For Leslie, the visions involve an uncle named Pete, who sexually abused her when she was a little girl; these visions are intensified by the similar lusts of Pete who lives at the Wayside Inn.

Confused by the visions, the four guests find themselves separated. Jack meets Susan, a young girl who has been held captive by the staff. Susan reminds Jack of his deceased daughter, especially after she claims to have been in contact with her spirit; Susan assures Jack, and later Stephanie, that their daughter is in a good place.

Emotionally tormented by the visions, stalked by the homicidal Wayside staff, and under constant threat from the Tin Man, all four guests succumb to the various pressures and start to turn on each other. Shortly after they discover that the staff worships the Devil, Jack is split into two identical people; each seems to think of himself as the "real" Jack, yet each bleeds black mist when injured, making it impossible for anyone to figure out which is the real Jack and which is the doppelganger.

The couples almost escape when they are aided by Officer Lawdale (the same state trooper who had given bad directions to Jack and Stephanie), but they are recaptured when Lawdale turns out to be working with the Wayside staff. Lawdale and the Wayside staff try to force the couples to appease the Tin Man by choosing one of themselves to kill. Past tensions initially lead the viewer to believe that Randy will resolve the situation by killing Jack, but he instead turns the gun on Susan with Leslie yelling at him to kill her. Jack hits the table Randy is standing on and the shot is deflected. Leslie grabs a knife and accidentally stabs Randy after seeing a hallucination of her uncle. In retaliation, Randy shoots Leslie and they both die. Jack and Stephanie watch as Lawdale turns the gun on Susan. Susan tells them Melissa is safe and loves them both. Lawdale shoots and Susan is hit. Jack and Stephanie run to Susan's body as light emits from the bullet hole. Jack and Stephanie force Susan's light at Lawdale and destroy him.

Finally able to escape the inn, Jack and Stephanie trek back to their car, where they discover their bodies, as well as the dead bodies of Leslie and Randy while police officers and EMTs talk about the crash of their two vehicles. Jack and Stephanie realize that their entire experience at the inn was a shared out of body experience. As their souls re-enter their bodies, Jack and Stephanie wake up and are taken away in an ambulance. They are watched over by a resurrected Susan, who observes that their love for each other has been reawakened by the events at the Wayside Inn. As the couple ride off in an ambulance, Jack looks out the window to see Lawdale laughing at him from the front gate of the Wayside, with the caretakers watching out of an upstairs window.

== Cast ==
- Michael Madsen as "Tin Man" / Fake Officer Lawdale
- Reynaldo Rosales as Jack Singleton
- Heidi Dippold as Stephanie Singleton
- Julie Ann Emery as Leslie Taylor
- J.P. Davis as Randy Messarue
- Lew Temple as Pete
- Leslie Easterbrook as Betty
- Bill Moseley as Stewart
- Paweł Deląg as Officer Lawdale
- Weronika Rosati as Mrs. Lawdale
- Allana Bale as Susan
- Florentyna Synowiecka as Melissa Singleton
- Lance Henriksen as "Tin Man" (voice)

== Release ==
The film received a rating of R for some violence and terror.

The film was given a limited release to theaters on November 7, 2008, where it opened in 25th place with a weekend earning of $327,445. In total it earned $575,048 during its U.S. theatrical run. The film was released to DVD on April 7, 2009, via Lions Gate Entertainment.

== Reception ==
The review aggregator website Rotten Tomatoes reported a 0% approval rating with an average rating of 2.83/10, based on 12 reviews. Metacritic assigned a score of 24 out of 100, based on 4 critics, indicating "generally unfavorable" reviews.

Luke Y. Thompson of The Village Voice criticized Rosales and Dippold as the protagonists, calling them, "overly bland and poorly cast," and the lack of screen time for Madsen, Temple, Moseley and Easterbrook as the antagonists. Thompson also praised their performances. Mark H. Harris of About.com gave the film a D+, praising the film for its setup and cast, but criticized the story and action sequences. He also called the film, "surprisingly dull and uninspired." Marc Savlov of The Austin Chronicle gave the film 1.5/5 stars, and said, "[the film] has a few moments that ring genuinely eerie, but the cluttered, unconvincing dialogue... make it more of a genre curiousity [sic] than anything the Fangoria gang would likely want to sit through."
