= Rob Green (film director) =

American film director

- Occupation(s): Film director, film editor, producer

Rob Green is a film director, producer, editor and screenwriter.

== Biography ==
He is most notable for The Bunker and the drama-horror-thriller House. He works currently on his upcoming project, the history science fiction film Gladiators v Werewolves: Edge of Empire.

== Filmography ==
- The Black Cat (1995)
- The Trick (1997)
- The Bunker (2001)
- House (2008)
