= The Oath (Peretti novel) =

1995 novel by Frank Peretti

- Author: Frank Peretti
- Cover artist: Jim Thiesen
- Language: English
- Genre: Christian fiction, horror
- Publisher: Word Publishing
- Publication date: 1995
- Media type: book
- Pages: 656
- ISBN: 1595541896

The Oath is an allegorical 1995 horror/fantasy novel by Frank E. Peretti. The recipient of the 1996 ECPA Gold Medallion Book Award for Best Fiction, the story centers on the fictional mining town of Hyde River, the gruesome deaths of many of the townspeople, and an "oath" that the residents of Hyde River have taken up to hide the secret behind them.

== Plot ==
Nature photographer Cliff Benson is found dead in the woods near the town of Hyde River, with his head and torso missing. His wife, Evelyn, is found covered with blood and half-crazed on a logging road and taken to a hospital, where she only has vague recollections of the events that transpired. Sheriff Les Collins is quick to pin the blame on a rogue bear. Cliff's brother Steve quickly finds holes in the theory and teams up with local sheriff's deputy Tracy Ellis. At the same time, several residents of the town are afflicted with a mysterious black rash which spreads over their bodies.

Benson and Ellis discover that a giant dragon is responsible for the deaths and that Harold Bly has the ability to control it. Through reading old letters and diaries provided to him by Levi Cobb, Benson learns that the town was purged of Christianity in the late 19th century, and any Christians taking residence in the town were either martyred or driven out. Those remaining reestablished Hyde River after signing a charter which gave the dragon free rein of the town. The town's founder and Harold Bly's ancestor, Benjamin Hyde, was believed to have control over the dragon.

Benson arranges to meet Bly at the bar to make peace. There, he learns that Harold Bly and all of his henchmen have the rash and that Harold never did control the dragon at all. Both the dragon and the rash are physical manifestations of unrepented sin. Bly drugs Benson's beer and takes him prisoner in an attempt to purge the town of Christianity as their ancestors did years ago. Benson escapes, but Ellis is eaten by the dragon. Filled with grief, Steve vows to destroy the dragon. He then puts one of Levi Clements plans into action and confronts the dragon using a makeshift spear constructed by Cobb. As Harold Bly and his followers watch in awe, the dragon attacks Benson with its fiery breath, but he does not suffer any burns. Frightened by the power of God, the dragon backs into the spear until it slides between its scales and into its heart. As the dragon's dying act, it bites Bly in half and dematerializes in a bright flash. The other townsfolk swear revenge on Benson for killing their dragon. Benson points to their hearts and tells them that they still have their dragon inside of them.
