= Sky Angel =

American Christian media company

Sky Angel Networks, LLC
- Type: Limited liability company
- Industry: Television broadcasting
- Founded: 1980 (company founded); 1996 (service launch)
- Founder: Robert Johnson Sr.
- Defunct: 2014 (as a service provider) 2019 (as a company)
- Headquarters: Naples, Florida
- Key people: Robert Johnson Jr., CEO

Sky Angel Networks, LLC was an American operator of Christian television networks; it operated three channels, Angel One, Angel Two, and KTV, all of which were exclusive to Dish Network. The company's corporate headquarters were located in Naples, Florida. The company also operated a Chattanooga, Tennessee location where programming, engineering and network operations resided.

The company previously operated as a Christian-oriented television provider carrying religious and family-oriented programming, first as a satellite television service, and later as an over-the-top internet television provider. The shift to an IPTV platform was later accompanied by the spin-off of the provider's secular offerings into a second service known as FAVE TV.

On January 14, 2014, Sky Angel ceased its IPTV business, citing that because it did not fall under the traditional legal definition of a multichannel video programming distributor, it was unable to employ legal remedies for its allegations that broadcasters were discriminating against its business model by preventing carriage of their channels.

== History ==
=== 1980–1995: early years ===
Sky Angel was formed in 1980 by Robert Johnson Sr., who aimed to create a faith-based television service that would be free of the objectionable content he had found on television. Johnson obtained an allocation of 8 direct-broadcast satellite frequencies for the service, and reached a deal with Dish Network to use space on its EchoStar III satellite.

=== 1996–2008: satellite service ===
Sky Angel satellite service launched in 1996. The channel lineup would consist primarily of religious networks, along with other secular television networks which the service considered to be family-oriented. The service featured 36 channels in its lineup as of November 2002, consisting of 20 television channels and 16 radio channels. Sky Angel reached around 115,000 subscribers, mostly within the Central United States.

On April 1, 2008, Sky Angel discontinued its satellite service operations, as it declined to invest around $400 million to replace the aging EchoStar III satellite, and it sold its DBS frequencies to EchoStar. Customers were encouraged to sign up to Sky Angel IPTV. The company was criticized for refusing to provide lifelong satellite subscribers with lifelong IPTV service.

=== 2007–2013: IPTV transition ===
On January 22, 2007, Sky Angel partnered with ShifTV to launch Sky Angel IPTV service in Canada. By October 2007, this partnership has dissolved due to ShifTV being restructured to launch an adult pornography service. On July 10, 2007, Sky Angel launched a separate IPTV service in the United States. This involved a partnership with NeuLion to develop a new over-the-top IPTV-based platform, which offered increased channel capacity and network DVR support. Sky Angel has also contemplated offering internet and mobile television services, but declined to do so.

In September 2012, Sky Angel launched its "Sky Angel 2.0" platform, offering services featuring religious channels delivered via set-top boxes, and "Faith Everywhere", which added web streaming of its lineup through an iPad app. Sky Angel also introduced a new spin-off service known as FAVE TV ("Family and Values Entertainment")—a secular service which aimed to carry "mainstream" and "family-friendly" television channels. In June 2013, the Faith Everywhere service became available through an app for Roku digital media players.

=== 2014–2019: Dish Network exclusivity ===
On January 14, 2014, Sky Angel suspended its television services; in an FCC complaint, the company detailed that it had been unable to offer a competitive service to its subscribers because content providers (including in particular, Discovery Communications) had refused to allow the provider to "acquire programming in a fair and nondiscriminatory way".

== Products and services ==
=== Satellite service ===
Sky Angel offered satellite service with monthly, yearly or lifelong plans. The service featured 36 channels, including 20 television channels and 16 radio channels. This service was discontinued on April 1, 2008.

From that time until January 2019, Dish Network offered a DishFAMILY package (later renamed Smart Pack) with over 50 family-friendly TV channels, including Sky Angel's three in-house channels: Angel One, Angel Two (which broadcast the Hunt Channel during specified times) and Kids & Teens TV. Several third-party channels from the Sky Angel package, such as the Trinity Broadcasting Network, are also included in these Dish packages.

=== IPTV service ===
Sky Angel IPTV was available from 2007 to 2013. The service launched in 2007 as a Christian television provider for Canada. In 2008, the IPTV service replaced the Sky Angel satellite service in the United States. The IPTV service offered over 72 channels, including over 50 television channels and over 20 radio channels. By 2010, the lineup featured over 80 channels. Channels were split into various packages:

- The Faith Package: includes over 30 television channels from faith-based broadcasters (Protestant and Catholic broadcasters, plus video on demand) and all radio channels.
- The Family Package: includes over 20 television channels from secular networks: CBS Sports Network, Discovery Channel, NFL Network and more.
- The Family Values Package: includes both the Faith Package and the Family Package.
- The WebTV Package: includes several television and radio stations. This package is available internationally.
- BabyFirst: available à la carte for United States subscribers.

== Carriage disputes ==
Sky Angel's switch to an over-the-top IPTV service led to several major carriage disputes, which led to concerns over the definition of Sky Angel's service under the regulations of the Federal Communications Commission (FCC).

In 2009, C-SPAN was pulled from Sky Angel after being on its IPTV service for 2 days. In November 2012, Sky Angel filed an antitrust lawsuit against the network claiming that its owners (a consortium of major television providers) pulled its programming from Sky Angel to put the service at a disadvantage against its conventional rivals. The court dismissed the case without prejudice, believing that Sky Angel's case did not have enough evidence to justify its claims that C-SPAN's owners were trying to enforce a monopoly position. C-SPAN denied Sky Angel's arguments, and claimed the removal was for contractual reasons relating to IPTV. Sky Angel, in its filing with the court, showed that C-SPAN was already streaming its channels over the web to the public free of charge. In June 2013, the company subsequently filed a second antitrust suit. The claims were rejected, with the court arguing once again that Sky Angel had produced no actual evidence of collusion among the C-SPAN consortium.

In April 2010, Discovery Communications announced that it would pull its channels from Sky Angel in response to unspecified concerns surrounding how its programming was delivered. In response, Sky Angel filed a program access complaint with the Federal Communications Commission, alleging that Discovery was discriminating against the service by allowing other major cable providers to offer access to its programming over the internet (either through a TV Everywhere service, or through Dish Network's Slingbox-based set-top boxes). The FCC denied Sky Angel's request for a standstill on the case, but the FCC Media Bureau began to dispute whether Sky Angel qualified as a "multichannel video programming distributor" (MVPD) under the regulations because it does not have a physical "transmission path" in its infrastructure. The commission, along with allies such as Google, acknowledged that making any ruling on whether an over-the-top service qualifies as an MVPD may have a major effect on the Internet video industry as a whole. Google later launched its own over-the-top internet television service, YouTube TV, on February 28, 2017.

== See also ==
- Glorystar - free-to-air Christian satellite service provider
