= Wasilla Assembly of God =

Coordinates: 61.57156°N 149.45282°W

- Wasilla Assembly of God
- Location: 125 West Riley Ave; Wasilla, Alaska 99654
- Country: United States
- Denomination: Pentecostal
- Website: wasillaag.org

History
- Founded: 1951
- Founder: Paul Riley

The Wasilla Assembly of God is a Pentecostal church in the town of Wasilla, Alaska. It is affiliated with the Assemblies of God USA.

The church gained national attention in 2008 when United States presidential candidate Senator John McCain chose Alaska Governor Sarah Palin, an attendee of the church until 2002, as his running mate in the 2008 election.

== History ==
The church's founding pastor was Paul Riley. Originally meeting in the Wasilla Community Hall in 1951, the church purchased property and constructed a building that would be expanded and eventually house the church until the early 1980s when new land further down Knik-Goosebay Road was purchased and a new church built to accommodate growth. Around this time Tim McGraw succeeded Riley as pastor. McGraw served as pastor for 12 years before being succeeded by Ed Kalnins in 1999.

== Controversy ==
=== Ed Kalnins ===
After the 2008 nomination of Sarah Palin for Vice President of the United States, senior pastor Ed Kalnins' preaching was scrutinized by the media. His sermons were available on the church website. USA Today reported the Huffington Post assertion that "Kalnins has preached that critics of President Bush will be banished to hell; questioned whether people who voted for Sen. John Kerry in 2004 would be accepted into heaven; and preached that the Sept. 11 attacks and the war in Iraq were part of a world war over Christianity". Kalnins preached "I believe that Alaska is one of the refuge states... in the Last Days, and hundreds of thousands of people are going to come to this state to seek refuge. And the church has to ready to minister to them".

In an interview cited by the Wall Street Journal, Kalnins clarified his remarks on the Iraq war, saying "I don't think it's God's will to have a war. But in Iraq, America is fighting an enemy that has made it a war over beliefs". The church also issued a statement clarifying the Kerry assertions, "Those who know our church and Pastor Ed know that we often say things in a humorous, tongue in cheek manner. We do realize the danger in that. This is the way in which Pastor Ed made the controversial remark. We do acknowledge in hindsight that it was careless, and we do apologize for that".

=== Thomas Muthee ===
Guest speaker Thomas Muthee's background, especially his accusations of witchcraft against a woman known as "Mama Jane", received a great deal of media attention. Muthee's sermons have also been scrutinized, especially during a 2005 appearance at the Wasilla Assembly of God during which he prayed for Sarah Palin, asking God to protect her from witchcraft and for God to supply people and financial resources for her then-campaign for Alaska governor. The Boston Herald described it as "all smoke and no fire", pointing out that some religious experts believed that, in light of Muthee's cultural background, there was nothing strange about the prayer.

=== Sarah Palin ===
Baptized in the church at the age of 12, Sarah Palin was an attendee until 2002. Speaking at the church in 2008, Palin asked congregants to "Pray for our military men and women who are striving to do what is right also for this country" and pray "that our national leaders are sending them out on a task that is from God. That's what we have to make sure we're praying for: that there is a plan and that plan is God's plan".

== Ministries ==
Wasilla Assembly of God sponsors a youth group for girls in Kindergarten to 8th grade called the Missionettes. The youth group conducts several community service projects each year. The church hosts an annual Christian music concert called "Winter Rock Fest", which began in 2005, and now attracts over 1,000 youth each year.

The church runs ministries providing help to poor neighborhoods, care for children in need, and general community services. In cooperation with Alaska Family Services, the Salvation Army, and other area churches, the Wasilla Assembly of God distributed baskets to 39 families in Wasilla during Thanksgiving of 2005. The church also supplies food to the annual free Thanksgiving meal hosted by Shema Christian Ministries. The church established a teen youth learning center called Rally Point in 2006. Rally Point is located in the church's original building at Knik-Goose Bay Road.

The Master's Commission program is a live-in religious educational program for young adults. "To Know God and To Make Him Known" is the twofold purpose of Master's Commission discipleship ministry. The program is similar to other such programs at Assemblies of God congregations throughout the United States.
