= Frank Peretti =

Canadian-American author (born 1951)

Frank E. Peretti
- Born: Frank Edward Peretti; January 13, 1951 (age 75); Lethbridge, Alberta, Canada
- Education: University of California, Los Angeles
- Occupation: Author
- Spouse: Barbara (m. 1972)
- Writing career
- Genre: Christian fiction
- Notable works: This Present Darkness, The Oath

Frank Edward Peretti (born January 13, 1951) is a New York Times best-selling author of Christian fiction, whose novels primarily focus on the supernatural and spiritual warfare. As of 2012, his works have sold over 15 million copies worldwide. He has been described by The New York Times as creating the Christian thriller genre. Peretti is best known for his novels This Present Darkness (1986) and Piercing the Darkness (1989). Peretti has held ministry credentials with the Assemblies of God, and formerly played the banjo in a bluegrass band called Northern Cross. He now lives in Coeur d'Alene, Idaho, with his wife, Barbara.

== Biography ==
Frank E. Peretti was born in Lethbridge in southern Alberta, Canada, but raised in Seattle, Washington, for most of his life. As a child, he had a cystic hygroma, a facial tumor which affected his ability to speak until later receiving surgery and speech therapy. He became a natural storyteller who regularly told monster stories to neighborhood children. After graduating from high school, he began playing banjo with a local bluegrass group. He married his wife, Barbara, in 1972. Later, he studied English, screen writing and film at UCLA, and assisted his father in pastoring a small Assembly of God church on Vashon Island from 1978 to 1983, also taking construction jobs to make ends meet. While working as a pastor, teaching children at church camps "rekindled his interest in storytelling".

== Writing ==
=== Early work ===
After leaving pastoring and while working at a ski factory, Peretti wrote and published a well-received adventure story for children, The Door in the Dragon's Throat (1985). A year later, he published This Present Darkness (1986), his most famous and popular novel to date. It was initially rejected by fourteen publishers before being picked up by Crossway Books. Although This Present Darkness was not an immediate success, sales improved with word of mouth, particularly after singer Amy Grant promoted the book. Peretti also spoke at Christian music festivals. The book remained on the Christian Booksellers Association's top ten best-sellers list for over 150 consecutive weeks, and has as of 2013 sold over 2.7 million copies worldwide.

Peretti followed This Present Darkness with a sequel, Piercing the Darkness (1989), another tremendous success. Combined, This Present Darkness and Piercing the Darkness have sold 3.5 million copies as of 2012. As of 2021, This Present Darkness continues to sell approximately 8,000 copies per year.

Peretti also took the characters from his first work The Door in the Dragon's Throat and used them to write The Cooper Kids Adventure Series, releasing seven more titles that contained the same Indiana Jones–style adventures similar to The Door in the Dragon's Throat.

Throughout the 1990s, Peretti continued to write full-time, releasing Prophet (1992), The Oath (1995), and The Visitation (1999). The Oath, generally regarded as one of Peretti's greater works, has sold more than one million copies, and received the ECPA Gold Medallion Book Award for Best Fiction in 1996. The Visitation landed at #19 on The New York Times Best Seller list and was adapted into a film in 2006.

=== Later years ===
The turn of the millennium saw Peretti's departure from writing his popular novels. He wrote a 2000 memoir, The Wounded Spirit, which covered his struggles as a child with a facial tumor, which caused him to be mocked by other children and retreat to solitude until it was eventually treated with multiple surgeries. He dwelled on the subject of bullying in his non-fiction titles No More Victims (2001) and No More Bullies (2003).

In 2001, Peretti released Hangman's Curse, the first book in the Veritas Project series for teens. The book was an instant hit among both teens and adults, and was made into a low-budget 2003 film of the same name. The second book in the series, Nightmare Academy, was published in 2002 with equal success. The two books together sold more than 500,000 copies, according to Thomas Nelson Publishers. Peretti has mentioned that there may be more possible entries in the Veritas Project series.

Peretti's first full-length novel after 2000 was the 2005 thriller Monster, which played with the Bigfoot legend and explored issues surrounding the "survival of the fittest" and creationist-based objections to evolution. Monster hit The New York Times Best Seller list at #34 on its first week and rose to #29 on its second week.

In April 2006, Peretti and fellow supernatural author Ted Dekker co-authored the novel House. It received mixed reviews from Peretti and Dekker fans, but was popular enough to be adapted as the 2008 film House, starring Michael Madsen.

In April 2010, it was announced that Peretti had signed with Howard Books (a division of Simon & Schuster) for a new novel. The novel, Illusion, was published in March 2012.

=== Influence and themes ===
Peretti's work, with its themes of spiritual warfare, has been described belonging to "an older tradition of believers, including C. S. Lewis, John Bunyan, and John Milton (and before them, medieval and ancient apocalyptic writers), who depicted angels and humans at war."

Jay R. Howard summarizes the worldview underlying Peretti's works:

In this worldview education, government, the mass media, the ecological movement, and big business are each corrupted by a New Age/Satanic conspiracy for the control of society and souls of humans.

The New Age movement is noted by Howard as "the tie that binds the villains" throughout Peretti's novels. Peretti depicts New Age beliefs as promoting demonic activity and attempting to gain dominance while limiting Christianity. It is shown expanding through the education system – led by the US's top university – and practitioners including environmentalists, government officials, and teachers. Public education is thus "a battle ground for the confrontation of good and evil."

Marisa Ronan places Peretti's works in the context of the American Century. "Shaped by the politicization of evangelical concerns" and focusing on a culture war against the backdrop of the Cold War, "...at stake was Christianity's, and thus America's, hold on the twentieth century".

The theme of false sexual abuse allegations against Peretti's protagonists by women and children – because they are possessed by demons – has been mentioned by several reviewers. One reviewer describes it as "a terrible willingness to forgive child abuse and sexual assault if the accused was a powerful man and the accuser was a woman or child" mirrored in American evangelicalism, while another notes that not only are all of the victims depicted as "demonically-possessed liar[s]", but those in helping roles are also "villains": "Those who are on the frontline of helping children and survivors – public school teachers, therapists, social workers, child advocates – are cast as evil".

Another recurring theme in Peretti's writings is the concept of a peaceful, simple life. Characters are described as living on quaint farms, living a simple, rural life, or living in small, community-focused towns. In one interview, Peretti noted that he believes Christians ought to "live a quiet life, mind our own business, work with our own hands, and walk properly toward those outside."

== Filmography ==
Tilly, a novella which started out as an audio drama produced by Focus on the Family and aired on August 10, 1987, was adapted into a forty-minute film by anti-abortion group Love Life America in 2002 and shown on both PAX TV and briefly on the EWTN show Defending Life before being released on DVD. It was directed by Stephen Vidano and produced by IMS Productions.

In 2004 Hangman's Curse was made into a film, in which Peretti himself had a small role as an eccentric professor, Dr. Algernon Wheeling. It had a limited release in theaters but appears to have been successful enough to encourage film producers to continue developing Peretti's books into films.

The Visitation was also made into a film by Twentieth Century Fox in 2006.

House was released in select theaters on November 7, 2008.

In addition to his appearance in Hangman's Curse, Peretti has had a voice role in Flo, the Lying Fly, the second animated entry in the Hermie and Friends series for children. He has also made a number of videos (and associated audio tapes and books) in which he takes on the persona of Mr. Henry, a slightly eccentric inventor and Bible teacher.

== Critical reviews ==
Peretti has been hailed as "America's hottest Christian novelist" and has been called a "sanctified Stephen King" and "the Stephen King of Christian fiction". In comparison to King, however, Peretti says, "Stephen King doesn't have any supernatural good guys. Usually the supernatural is evil, and it's up to the humans to deal with it. In my books, I introduce a supernatural good to combat the supernatural evil. At least you've got a fighting chance."

He has received generally positive praise from many Christian book reviews, his books being heralded as telling entertaining stories with complex interwoven plots.

== Theological criticisms ==
Peretti's fictional portrayal of spiritual warfare reflects in part his background in the Assemblies of God and the contemporary focus of Neo-charismatic writings on the demonic. His concept of territorial spirits reigning over cities with the related spiritual mapping is paralleled in the Neo-charismatic world, including in non-fiction works in theology and missions by Charismatic writers such as C. Peter Wagner (and the related New Apostolic Reformation), Larry Lea, Ed Silvoso and Ed Murphy.

His books have been considered to reflect the New Christian Right. As his novels have been widely sold and read throughout evangelical, Charismatic and Pentecostal churches, Peretti's fiction has excited the imaginations of clergy and laity alike on the subject of spiritual warfare. Michael Maudlin of Christianity Today reports hearing that some readers have been so enthused they have declared that This Present Darkness is the best book ever written after the Bible. He has also described its theology as "closer to primitive dualism than traditional Christian theism."

Some critical reservations have been expressed by a number of evangelical and Pentecostal writers that many readers are using Peretti's novels as manuals on prayer, exorcism, spiritual warfare and as guidebooks about dangers of the New Age movement. For example, Kim Riddlebarger expresses alarm that many readers have "redefined their entire worldview based upon a novel" and insists that the Bible does not call upon Christians to "engage in spiritual warfare as a combat between angels and demons". Peretti has commented regarding this use of his work. His 1992 novel Prophet included a disclaimer stating "This novel is a creative work of fiction imparting spiritual truth in a symbolic manner, and not an emphatic statement of religious doctrine", and upon publication of The Oath he stated, "If you really want to study spiritual warfare, read the Bible. Don't read my book."

Irving Hexham rejects Peretti's depiction of the New Age as confirming a negative stereotype. Hexham observes that Peretti's novels reflect the anxieties that many fundamentalist and evangelical Christians have about secular society, the mass media, the social sciences and tertiary education. He is also disturbed "to see the way Frank Peretti has become a popular and oft-quoted authority on the New Age" because "his actual qualifications in religious matters are minimal". Andrew Connolly notes that "these enemies, united under a New Age banner, are motivated not simply by an alternative religious ideology, but by demons" in Peretti's work.

== Impact ==
In addition to creating the Christian thriller genre, Peretti's work has had a notable impact on Christian literature and culture. Phyllis Tickle, religion editor of Publishers Weekly, called Peretti "the daddy, the king of, the sine qua non of the contemporary evangelical Christian fiction, if you cut out inspirational from that category." Christianity Today and The New York Times have stated his work has led the way for later Christian fiction such as the Left Behind series, which authors Tim LaHaye and Jerry B. Jenkins have acknowledged, as well as for fiction by Pat Robertson and Chuck Colson.

Connolly argues Peretti's writing opened the door for other evangelical fiction that is gendered as masculine. Peretti "truly is the initiator of the male evangelical Christian fiction", noted Tickle in 1995. Peretti has stated the Christian fiction market previously wanted "prairie romance-type books" and "used to be very nonconfrontative – you know, the young woman struggling against the rigors of prairie life meets a fine young Christian minister."

The editor-in-chief of the publisher Crossway Books has described Peretti's thrillers as being written for the Moral Majority, stating, "there are 35 or 40 million people in this country who are really upset with the way things are. For once, their side is not beaten down. They win." While his thrillers deal with war between angels and demons, the Los Angeles Times notes they also "[explore] other issues such as curricula used in public schools and attempts by a thinly disguised version of the American Civil Liberties Union to shut down a Christian school by charging that corporal punishment constitutes child abuse." Historian Crawford Gribben argues Peretti's work "certainly set the terms for the re-energizing and even the remilitarization, of evangelicalism"; others have noted his writings encourage readers to take political action.

Peretti's work, promoted early on in the contemporary Christian music (CCM) scene, has also had an influence on popular Christian music. Performer Carman is one CCM musician whose music has drawn comparisons to Peretti. Religion historian Leah Payne writes:

Many CCM songs...showed keen interest in spiritual warfare, but Peretti's vast, vivid, and rollicking Pentecostal universe came to life on stage with the most potency through Carman's shows. Part Liberace-esque Las Vegas showstopper, part Billy Graham revival preacher, part Rat Pack crooner, Carman's work might best be categorized as 'camp.' His theatrical, over-the-top, gaudy, and sometimes grotesque concerts were multimedia evangelistic extravaganzas meant to impress upon attendees their particular role in resisting and rebuking the devil's work.

Likewise, Carman's music has been described by Relevant magazine as "operatic, story-driven songs that often centered around cosmic battles between God and Satan, similar to Frank Peretti by way of Meatloaf."

Some scholars have argued that Peretti's works, with their themes of spiritual warfare and conspiracies, have paved the way for evangelical acceptance of President Donald Trump. Daniel Silliman, professor of American religion and culture at Heidelberg University, asserts that Trump played off the types of fears among evangelical Christians found in Peretti's books and later works inspired by him such as the Left Behind series. Theological studies professor André Gagné, who has written on the Christian dominionist movement the New Apostolic Reformation (NAR), states that its founder C. Peter Wagner "regarded Frank Peretti's novels as the best illustration of actual spiritual warfare." Religious studies scholar Damon T. Berry argues that despite the books' fictional settings, the spiritual warfare and demonology presented – also seen in the NAR's prophecies regarding Trump – are intended to be true-to-life. QAnon, with its messianic spiritual warfare overtones, has been connected to "the same culture previously captivated and emboldened" by Peretti's novels such as the Darkness series.

Peretti's books have been translated to dozens of languages, among them Chinese, Croatian, French, German, Hungarian, Norwegian, Polish, Russian and Swedish.

== Bibliography ==
=== Novels ===
- This Present Darkness (1986)
- Piercing the Darkness (1989)
- Prophet (1992)
- The Oath (1995)
- The Visitation (1999)
- Monster (2005)
- House (2006; with Ted Dekker)
- Illusion (2012)

=== The Veritas Project series ===
1. Hangman's Curse (2001)
2. Nightmare Academy (2002)

=== The Harbingers series ===
1. Invitation: Cycle One (2017)
2. The Assault: Cycle Two (2017)
3. Probing: Cycle Three (2017)
4. The Pursuit: Cycle Four (2017)
5. The Finish: Cycle Five (2018)

=== The Cooper Kids adventure series ===
1. The Door in the Dragon's Throat (1985)
2. Escape from the Island of Aquarius (1986)
3. The Tombs of Anak (1987)
4. Trapped at the Bottom of the Sea (1988)
5. The Secret of the Desert Stone (1995)
6. The Deadly Curse of Toco-rey (1996)
7. The Legend of Annie Murphy (1996)
8. Flying Blind (1997) (also known as Mayday at Two Thousand Five Hundred Feet)

=== Non-fiction ===
- The Wounded Spirit (2000)
- No More Victims (2000)
- No More Bullies (2003)

=== Other titles ===
- Tilly (1988)
- All Is Well: The Miracle of Christmas in July (2003)
