= Piercing the Darkness =

1989 novel

- Front cover
- Author: Frank E. Peretti
- Language: English
- Genre: Christian fiction
- Publisher: Turtleback Books
- Publication date: 1989
- Publication place: United States
- Media type: Print
- Pages: 441
- Awards: Gold Medallion Book Award
- ISBN: 9780613129657
- OCLC: 20274935
- Preceded by: This Present Darkness

Piercing the Darkness, which was published in 1989, is a sequel to Frank E. Peretti's novel This Present Darkness. It shows contemporary views on angels, demons, prayer and the spiritual realm. Piercing the Darkness won the ECPA Gold Medallion Book Award for best fiction in 1990. The book, along with This Present Darkness, has been instrumental in promoting belief among Christians in territorial spirits. They have also increased an interest in spiritual warfare. Combined, This Present Darkness and Piercing the Darkness have sold 3.5 million copies as of 2012.

== Plot summary ==
The novel follows the journey of Sally Beth Roe as she tries to escape her past and slowly overcomes her constant struggle to discern the truth. Also told is the story of another small town, similar to that of This Present Darkness and called Bacon's Corner, and a resident named Tom Harris. His children are removed from his home by Child Services. Seeming to have no connection with other events at first, a young police officer, Ben Cole, is convinced what is being brushed off as a suicide is actually a murder, and ends up losing his job over the issue, which brings him to the side of an embattled Christian school. Caught in the crossfire is Amber, a girl who has been forced into a curriculum of "meditation techniques" and "inner spiritual guides" that control her moods, attitudes, and actions, and her mother Lucy who realizes this lawsuit and the people who are "helping" her may be much, much more than she bargained for. Before the paths that Sally Roe and Tom Harris (and the others) are on collide, the Ashton Clarion editor and his wife, Marshall and Kate Hogan (from This Present Darkness), make a return appearance as veteran fighters in this war against the powers of darkness that threaten freedom of religion everywhere. As the story unfolds, the lawsuit and its participants are soon locked in a struggle of ethics versus non-ethics, absolutes versus relativism, right versus wrong, and those with interest in this battle are shown to be even in the highest places of government.
