= Kids & Teens TV =

Christian children's television channel

- Headquarters: Naples, Florida, United States

Ownership
- Owner: Dominion Foundation
- Sister channels: Angel One; Angel Two

History
- Launched: January 4, 1999
- Closed: January 31, 2019
- Replaced by: JUCE TV West

Kids & Teens TV (KTV) was an American Christian children's television channel operated by the Dominion Foundation, a non-profit organization founded by Sky Angel's founder Robert W. Johnson. It was originally carried exclusively by Dish Network as part of Sky Angel's slate of services on the provider. The channel primarily carried a mixture of evangelical programming, children's Christian programming, and secular classic series (particularly westerns).

In October 2015, TBN's children's television service Smile of a Child announced that it had reached a deal to simulcast its programming on KTV from 7:00 a.m. to 7:00 p.m. ET effective October 26, 2015. This partnership ended on June 30, 2017.

On January 31, 2019, KTV, Angel One, and Angel Two shut down with warning and were pulled off the air after Sky Angel ceased operations.
