= The Paradise Novels =

Set of three novels by Ted Dekker

- Showdown; Saint; Sinner
- Author: Ted Dekker
- Language: English
- Genre: Christian, Science Fiction, Fantasy, Thriller
- Publisher: Thomas Nelson
- Published: 2006 - 2008
- Media type: Print (Hardcover and Paperback); Audiobook

The Paradise Novels is a set of three novels by Ted Dekker, written mostly in 2006, and is part of a larger story called the Books of History Chronicles, along with The Circle series, Immanuel's Veins, the Beyond the Circle books 1 and 2 (The 49th Mystic and Rise of the Mystics), and The Lost Books.

== Books ==
- Showdown (2006)
- Saint (2006)
- Sinner (2008)

== Plot ==
The first book, "Showdown" is all about a project started in a monastery in the mountains of Paradise Colorado. There, several children are brought up by monks, raised to be righteous. However, the brightest of the children, Billy, seeks the power that can be found in the lowest parts of the monastery. There, he finds the books of history and writes an evil character into existence. Jonny Drake and Samuel Abraham must find a way to get rid of the evil in Paradise.

The second book, "Saint" is about a sniper part of the "X group" who struggles with his identity. He is special though he does not know why. He knows himself as Carl, the Saint, and goes with his handler, Kelly, to America and ends up discovering who he truly is.

The third and final book of the Paradise novels is titled, "Sinner". It follows the story of Billy and Darsey, two children from the monastery who have special gifts and try to rid the world of evil but find themselves in more trouble when 3,000 stand up for the truth where it all started-in Paradise Colorado.
