= Spiritual warfare =

Christian concept of fighting against the work of preternatural evil forces

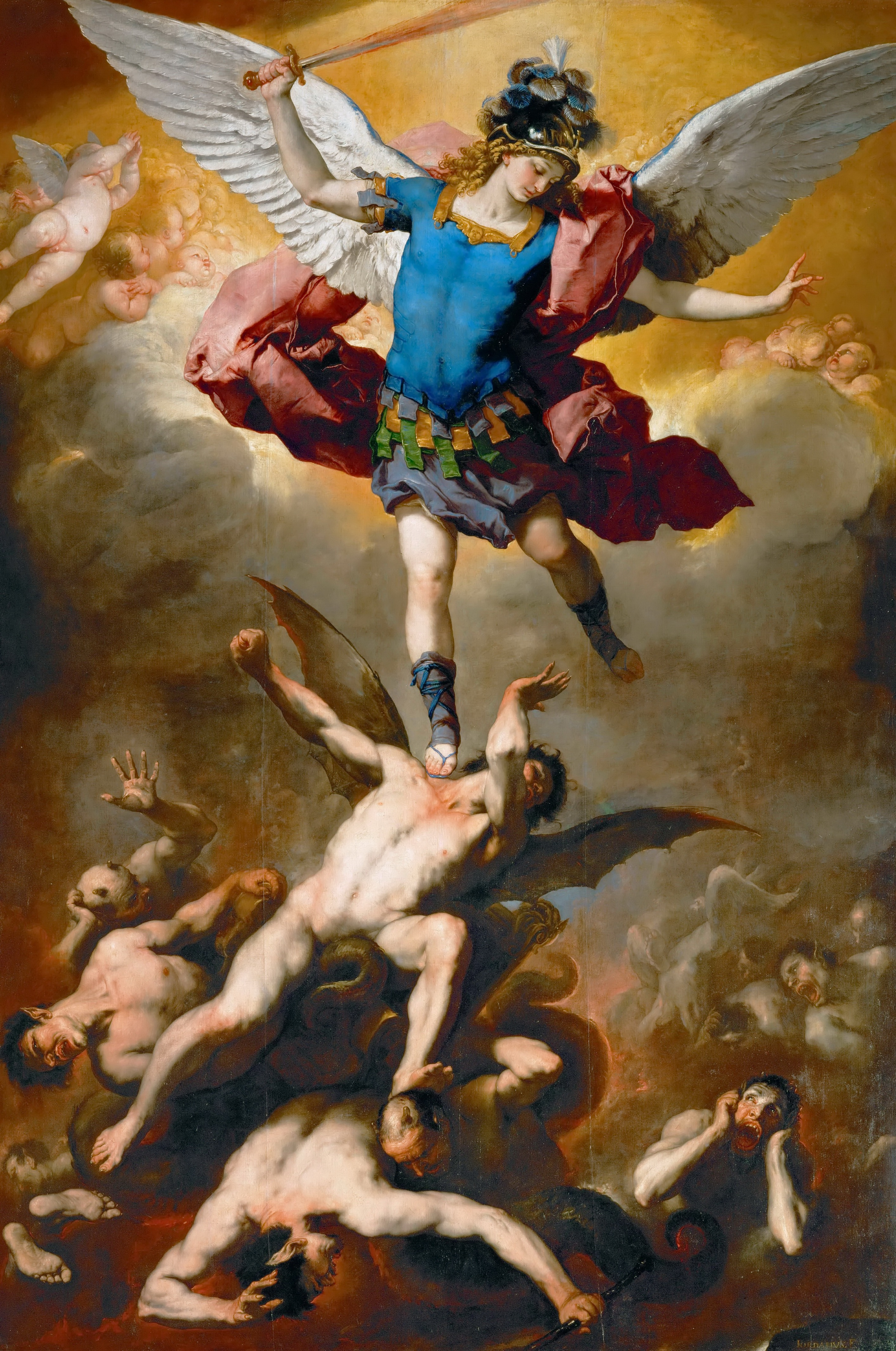
Luca Giordano's The Fall of the Rebel Angels, a common image of spiritual warfare

Spiritual warfare (often termed spiritual conflict or conflict with evil) is the Christian concept of fighting against the work of preternatural evil forces. It is based on the belief in evil spirits, or demons, that are said to intervene in human affairs in various ways. Although spiritual warfare is a prominent feature of neo-charismatic churches, various other Christian denominations and groups have also adopted practices rooted in the concepts of spiritual warfare, with Christian demonology often playing a key role in these practices and beliefs, or had older traditions of such a concept unrelated to the neo-charismatic movement, such as the exorcistic prayers of the Catholic Church, the Eastern Orthodox churches, and the Oriental Orthodox churches. The term spiritual warfare is used broadly by different Christian movements and in different contexts: "by charismatics, evangelicals, and Calvinists, and applied to missiology, counseling, and women."

Prayer is one common form of spiritual warfare practiced amongst these Christians. Other practices may include exorcism, the laying on of hands, fasting with prayer, praise and worship, and anointing with oil.

== Doctrines of spiritual warfare and exorcism ==
=== Mainstream Christian demonology ===
Mainstream Christianity typically acknowledges a belief in the existence (or ontological existence) of demons, fallen angels, the Devil and Satan. In Christian evangelism, doctrines of demonology are influenced by interpretations of the New Testament, namely interpretations of the Gospels, in that dealing with spirits became a customary activity of Jesus' ministry. Mark the Evangelist states that "he traveled throughout Galilee, preaching in their synagogues and driving out demons" (Mark 1:39).

=== Spiritual warfare in the New Testament ===
The majority of modern spiritual warfare theology is based on Ephesians 6:10-18. Ephesians 6:10–12 says, "Finally, be strong in the Lord and in his mighty power. Put on the full armor of God, so that you can take your stand against the devil’s schemes. For our struggle is not against flesh and blood, but against the rulers, against the authorities, against the powers of this dark world and against the spiritual forces of evil in the heavenly realms."

This is interpreted to mean that followers should struggle against the demonic forces, not against the people who are influenced by those demons. Common interpretation is that struggle is to be undertaken by standing firm in Christian beliefs, not by any actual violence—the 'armor' is awareness of evil forces and the 'weapon' is the gospel.

=== Evangelical Christian demonology ===
Many Evangelical Christian denominations believe that Satan and his agents exert significant influence over the world and its power structures. They believe that a conflict exists involving territorial spirits or other hostile spiritual forces, based on passages such as 1 John 5:19 ("the whole world is under the control of the evil one") and John 12:31, John 14:30 and John 16:11, where Jesus refers to Satan as "the prince of this world". Other verses cited include the apostle Paul's elaboration on a hierarchy of "rulers", in Ephesians 6:12, taken to be "demonic" in interpretation. They also believe that Paul's epistles focus on Jesus' victory over these powers. To this end, evangelical interpretations divide history into two eras: the "present evil age", and the "age to come", in reference to the Second Coming of Jesus.

Evangelical imagery of spiritual warfare is derived from various parts of the Bible, particularly the Book of Revelation wherein the 'beasts' and 'kings of the earth' wage war against God's people (Revelation 19:19) after the War in Heaven (Revelation 12:7), sparking a final battle with Satan and earthly nations against God (Revelation 20:8).

Evangelical Christians base the practice of exorcism on their understanding of Jesus' statement "If I drive out demons by the spirit of God, then the kingdom of God is upon you" at Matthew 12:28, Luke 11:20.

== Practices in Christianity ==
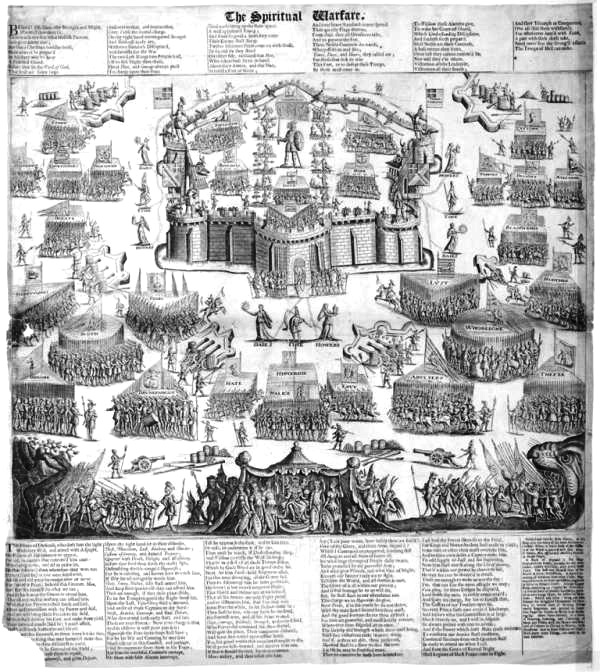
The Spiritual Warfare (c. 1623), a print by Martin Droeshout depicting the Devil's army besieging a walled city, held by a "Christian Soldier bold" guarded by figures representing the Christian virtues. It has been suggested that this print may have influenced John Bunyan to write The Holy War.

=== Catholic practices ===
The most notable of spiritual warfare prayers in the Catholic tradition is known as the Prayer to Saint Michael the Archangel.

Pope John Paul II stated that "'Spiritual combat'... is a secret and interior art, an invisible struggle in which monks engage every day against the temptations".

In modern times, the views of individual Roman Catholics of spiritual warfare have tended to divide into traditional and more modern understandings of the subject. An example of a more modern view of the demonic is found in the work of the Dominican scholar Richard Woods' The Devil.

In the 20th century the traditional outlook was represented by Father Gabriele Amorth, who has written three books on his personal experiences as an exorcist for the Vatican: An Exorcist Tells His Story, and An Exorcist: More Stories, and An Exorcist Explains the Demonic: The Antics of Satan and His Army of Fallen Angels. Francis MacNutt, who was a priest within the Roman Catholic Charismatic movement, has also addressed the subject of the demonic in his books, especially Deliverance from Evil Spirits.

Colleagues Father Chad Ripperger and Professor Dan Schneider are two American Catholics interested in the topic of spiritual warfare, who follow on from Father Amorth. Ripperger has published a 2016 book on Deliverance Prayers for Use by the Laity while Schneider wrote The Liber Christo Method: A Field Manual for Spiritual Combat in 2023, which guides readers "through a basic protocol for prayer and getting one's life in order, offering a more comprehensive approach to seeking spiritual freedom. It begins with renouncing spiritual evil, breaking off the source of demonic influence." One reviewer finds "this book to be the best accessible overview of the nature of spiritual warfare and how to enter into it comprehensively." Another reviewer finds Liber Christo to grace readers with "true freedom and healing" available through "a simple 12-lesson format. The manual encourages one to practice spiritual asceticism and self-discipline" that aligns with the teachings of St. Thomas Aquinas.

=== Lutheranism, Anglicanism and Reformed Christianity ===
The practice of exorcism was also known among the first generation of teachers and pastors in the Lutheran Reformation. Johannes Bugenhagen was the pastor of the Wittenberg town church and officiated at Martin Luther's wedding. In a letter addressed to Luther and Melanchthon dated November 1530, Pomeranus recounted his experience of dealing with a young girl who showed signs of demon possession. Pomeranus' method involved counseling the girl concerning her previous baptismal vows, he invoked the name of Christ and prayed with her. (Letter reproduced in Montgomery, Principalities and Powers).

The Anglican-Puritan writer William Gurnall wrote a lengthy three-volume work, The Christian in Complete Armour, published between 1662 and 1665. In this work Gurnall stressed the place of reading Scripture, prayer and the name of Christ.

=== Evangelicalism, Pentecostalism, and the Charismatic movement ===
In the American revival tradition among evangelicals, prominent 19th- and 20th-century preachers such as D. L. Moody, Billy Sunday, R. A. Torrey and Billy Graham have all affirmed their belief in the existence of the demonic and had occasions to recount some of their own spiritual warfare encounters. In the 19th century, one of the major evangelical authorities on demon possession was the missionary to China, John Livingstone Nevius.

Spiritual warfare has become a prominent feature in Pentecostal traditions and the concept is well embedded in Pentecostal history. Expositors of spiritual warfare include Jessie Penn-Lewis, who published the Pentecostal 1903 book War on the Saints, arising from the Welsh Revival in the early twentieth century. Starting in the 1950s with the charismatic Latter Rain movement, demonology began to grow in importance. British charismatic Michael Harper popularised the term spiritual warfare in his 1970 book of the same name. In 1976, prolific author Pastor Win Worley began the publication of his Hosts of Hell series, containing elements of the concept of spiritual warfare, if not explicitly using the expression. The third-wave charismatic movement of today—notably C. Peter Wagner and Cindy Jacobs – have been at the forefront of newer conceptions of spiritual warfare. Wagner's third-wave, which advocates for a militarized style of spiritual warfare to be enacted by "anointed prayer warriors," has given rise to spiritual warfare boot camps in which recruits are trained as soldiers to do battle against demonic influence.

Since the 1980s, the concept has spread from the charismatic world to broader evangelicalism; traditional boundaries between the two on the issue have eroded. This form of spiritual warfare has become especially popular among American evangelicals. American studies scholar S. Jonathon O'Donnell defines spiritual warfare: "A key idea in spiritual warfare is that demons don’t only attack people, as in depictions of demonic possession, but also take control of places and institutions, such as journalism, academia, and both municipal and federal bureaucracies. By doing so, demons are framed as advancing social projects that spiritual warriors see as opposing God’s plans." In 1991, Wagner published Confronting the Powers: How the New Testament Church Experienced the Power of Strategic-Level Spiritual Warfare and edited Territorial Spirits. In 1992, Dr. Ed Murphy wrote a modern 600-page book on the subject, The Handbook of Spiritual Warfare, from the point of view of deliverance ministry. Laws of Deliverance, From Proverbs (1980, 1983, 1995, 2000, 2003), written by Marilyn A. Ellsworth, is another important work of authority, as is her book ICBM Spiritual Warfare, God's Unbeatable Plan. Other Pentecostal and charismatic pastors include Don Basham, Derek Prince, Bishop Larry Gaiters, Reverend Miguel Bustillos, Dr. Marcus Haggard, and missionary Norman Parish, who have emphasized using the power of the blood of Christ in the deliverance ministry.

Sean McCloud comments, "In addition to shared supernatural themes, Third Wave spiritual warfare manuals resemble—and even cite—the occult grimoires they attack as demonic".

During the late 20th century, Evangelical writers such as Mark Bubeck and Merrill Unger presented their theological and pastoral response to demonic phenomena. The problem of demon possession and spiritual warfare became the subject of a Christian Medical Association symposium that was held in 1975. This symposium brought together a range of evangelical scholars in biblical studies, theology, psychology, anthropology, and missiology.

One of the most significant German writers is the Lutheran Kurt E. Koch whose work, including the 1973 book Occult ABC, has influenced much of both evangelical and charismatic thought in the late twentieth century. The impact of his ideas has been recently examined by the folklore specialist Bill Ellis.

The development of specific spiritual warfare techniques has also generated many discussions in the Christian missions community. Critical exchanges of views may be found in periodicals such as the Evangelical Missions Quarterly and in conferences sponsored by the Evangelical Missions Society. In 2000, an international collaborative attempt was made by evangelicals and charismatics in the Lausanne Committee for World Evangelization to reach some common agreement about spiritual warfare. The conference gathered in Nairobi, Kenya, and yielded a consultation document as well as many technical papers published as the book Deliver Us from Evil.

==== Spiritual mapping and the Charismatic movement ====
Spiritual mapping refers to the 21st-century belief among some Evangelicals that all history is a battle between Satan and God and that there are currently specific demons associated with specific locations (territorial spirits). Neo-Evangelicals who follow the spiritual mapping movement believe that these demons are the reason of lack of success for Christian missionaries and that they can use prayer and other Evangelical religious practices to counteract and drive out these demons. This, in turn, will accelerate the second coming of Christ. Missiologist George Otis coined the term in 1990 and C. Peter Wagner was a key figure in popularizing the concept.

=== Church of Jesus Christ of Latter-day Saints ===
In Latter Day Saint theology, spiritual warfare refers to the conflict between God and the forces of evil, particularly the opposition of Satan to Jesus Christ, human agency, and the plan of salvation. Latter-day Saint teachings describe Satan as a spirit who rebelled against God before mortal life and who continues to tempt human beings to turn away from God. The concept is associated with the doctrine of a premortal War in Heaven, the moral opposition encountered during mortal life, and the belief that individuals can resist evil through faith in Jesus Christ, repentance, prayer, and obedience to God's commandments.

==== The Book of Mormon ====
The Book of Mormon presents the conflict between good and evil primarily through teachings about opposition, agency, temptation, sin, and redemption. Although the book refers to the devil and his efforts to lead humanity away from God, it does not provide the same extended account of the premortal War in Heaven found in the Book of Moses and the Doctrine and Covenants. Its treatment of spiritual conflict is particularly concerned with the choices individuals make during mortal life and the consequences of accepting or rejecting Christ.

One of the book's central formulations appears in 2 Nephi 2, in which the prophet Lehi teaches that "it must needs be, that there is an opposition in all things" (2 Nephi 2:11). Lehi explains that opposition makes moral choice possible: human beings must be able to act for themselves and be enticed by alternatives if they are to exercise agency (2 Nephi 2:15–16). He subsequently contrasts the liberty and eternal life available through Jesus Christ with the captivity and spiritual death associated with the devil (2 Nephi 2:26–29). These teachings have become central to Latter-day Saint explanations of why mortal life includes temptation, adversity, and the possibility of sin.

The Book of Mormon also portrays Satan as seeking to undermine belief in God and the moral distinctions on which agency depends. In 2 Nephi 28:20–22, Nephi describes several strategies attributed to the devil: stirring people to anger against what is good, encouraging complacency and a false sense of security, and flattering people into believing that sin has no serious consequences. The passage has been used in Latter-day Saint teaching to illustrate how spiritual opposition can operate through attitudes, social influences, and gradual moral compromise rather than through overt acts of rebellion alone.

Other passages describe spiritual conflict in terms of competing influences on human conduct. In Alma 34:31–35, Amulek urges his listeners to repent without delay and warns that persistent rejection of repentance can leave a person subject to the spirit of the devil. In Moroni 7:12–19, Mormon distinguishes the influences of God from those of the devil by their relationship to goodness, righteousness, and the invitation to do good. These passages connect resistance to evil with repentance, discernment, and the cultivation of righteous conduct.

The Book of Mormon's account of Lehi's dream and the vision of the tree of life has also been interpreted in terms of spiritual conflict. In the vision, people travel along a path toward the tree of life while encountering darkness, confusion, and ridicule from those in a large building. The iron rod, interpreted in the text as the word of God, provides guidance and a means of remaining on the path (1 Nephi 8; 11–15). Some Latter-day Saint interpreters have compared this imagery to a siege, in which spiritual opposition attempts to separate people from Christ and the word of God.

==== Premortal conflict and agency ====
The Book of Mormon's teachings on opposition and agency form part of a broader Latter-day Saint cosmology in which the conflict between God and Satan began before the creation of the world. In the Church's canonical account of the War in Heaven, Lucifer opposed God's plan and sought divine honor for himself; he and the spirits who followed him were cast out of God's presence (Moses 4:1–4; Doctrine and Covenants 29:36–38; 76:25–29). In this account, the conflict continues in mortal life through temptation and efforts to lead human beings away from God.

The precise nature of Satan's proposal in the premortal conflict has been discussed by Latter-day Saint scholars and religious educators. A common interpretation holds that Satan sought to eliminate human agency by compelling everyone to be saved. However, Philip L. Barlow has argued that the scriptural accounts do not specify exactly how Satan intended to destroy agency and that the familiar explanation developed through later theological interpretation. Barlow's analysis situates the doctrine within the history of Latter-day Saint thought and emphasizes the importance of agency to the tradition's understanding of moral responsibility and spiritual development.

Terryl L. Givens likewise identifies the premortal conflict and the continuing opposition of Satan as important features of the Latter-day Saint understanding of the cosmos. In this theological framework, Satan and his followers are understood as disembodied spirits who seek to undermine human agency, while angels and divine assistance can help human beings fulfil God's purposes.

==== Practices and contemporary interpretations ====
In contemporary Latter-day Saint teaching, resisting spiritual opposition is generally associated with ordinary religious practices rather than with a separate system of ritual combat. Church teaching emphasizes faith in Jesus Christ, prayer, scripture study, repentance, keeping covenants, and seeking the guidance of the Holy Ghost. These practices are understood to strengthen individuals against temptation and to help them recognize influences that conflict with the gospel.

Latter-day Saint religious educators have also drawn analogies between the Book of Mormon's accounts of physical warfare and the spiritual struggles of modern believers. For example, Richard J. McClendon interprets the military preparations of Captain Moroni in Alma 43–62 as examples that can be applied to the development of spiritual preparedness and resistance to evil. Such applications are contemporary interpretations of the narrative rather than the Book of Mormon's explicit identification of every military conflict as a metaphor for spiritual warfare.

Ethnographic research has documented Latter-day Saints who understand experiences involving malevolent spirits as part of an ongoing spiritual conflict. In a 2023 article in the Journal of the American Academy of Religion, anthropologist Erin E. Stiles examined reports of spirit harassment among Latter-day Saints in northern Utah. Her research found that such experiences were interpreted within a religious framework linking righteousness, moral conduct, Satan, and the spirit world. Stiles's work documents particular beliefs and experiences within a community rather than establishing that all Latter-day Saints understand spiritual warfare in the same way.

=== Jehovah's Witnesses ===
Jehovah's Witnesses believe they are engaged in a "spiritual, theocratic warfare" against false teachings and wicked spirit forces they say try to impede them in their preaching work. Where their religious beliefs have been in conflict with national laws or other authorities—particularly in countries where their work is banned—they have advocated the use of "theocratic war strategy" to protect their interests, by hiding the truth from God's "enemies", being evasive, or withholding truthful or incriminating information. The Watchtower told Witnesses: "It is proper to cover over our arrangements for the work that God commands us to do. If the wolfish foes draw wrong conclusions from our maneuvers to outwit them, no harm has been done to them by the harmless sheep, innocent in their motives as doves."

== Christian teachings on the occult ==
In May 2021, the Baptist Deliverance Study Group of the Baptist Union of Great Britain, a Christian denomination, issued a "warning against occult spirituality following the rise in people trying to communicate with the dead". The commission reported that "Becoming involved in activities such as Spiritualism can open up a doorway to great spiritual oppression which requires a Christian rite to set that person free."

== Criticism ==
Some Christians explicitly reject the concept of spiritual warfare. In Germany, the United Evangelical Lutheran Church of Germany and the German Evangelical Alliance consider it to be "unbiblical", stating "The aggressive attitude and the presumption to fight against evil alongside or even instead of Christ, stands in opposition to the spirit of the gospel." The German Evangelical Alliance published a statement denouncing the 2001 spiritual warfare trip C. Peter Wagner and his organization Global Harvest Ministries undertook to defeat the territorial spirit known as the Queen of Heaven, which Wagner and associates believed prevented Christian missions within the 40/70 window.

In evangelism and worldwide Christian missions, Charles Kraft and C. Peter Wagner have emphasized problems with demonic influences on the world mission fields and the need to drive demons out. In contrast, others such as Brad Mullen of Columbia Theological Seminary argue that "some of these ideas, such as prayer walks and territorial demons, are not theological terms... many of these things have not been given the kind of theological inspection that they require." Robert Guelich of Fuller Theological Seminary has questioned the extent to which spiritual warfare has shifted from its basic moorings from being a metaphor for the Christian life. He underlines how spiritual warfare has evolved into "spiritual combat" techniques for Christians to seek power over demons. Guelich argues that the writings of the Apostle Paul in the Epistle through Ephesians are focused on proclaiming the peace of God and nowhere specify any techniques for battling demons. He also argues that the novels of Frank Peretti are at odds with both the gospel narratives on demons and Pauline teaching.

Missions specialists such Scott Moreau and Paul Hiebert have detected traces of animist thought encroaching on both evangelical and charismatic discourses about the demonic and spiritual warfare. Hiebert indicates that a dualist cosmology now appears in some spiritual warfare texts and it is based on the Greco-Roman mystery religions and Zoroastrian myths. However, Hiebert also chastises other evangelicals who have absorbed the modern secular outlook and have tended to downplay or even ignore the demonic. Hiebert speaks of the flaw of the excluded middle in the thinking of some evangelicals who have a cosmology of God in heaven and humans on earth, but have ignored the "middle" realm of the angelic and demonic.

American studies scholar S. Jonathan O'Donnell argues that "QAnon has many overlaps with spiritual warfare and its practitioners" and that demons are seen as part of the deep state, which ties in to Christian nationalism.

Some critics have linked the rise in aggressive forms of prayer to the increasing militarization of everyday life that characterizes 20th century cultural shifts towards the widespread normalization of highly militarized discourse, particularly in the practices and rituals of religious prayer and conversion. Matthew D. Taylor says the language of spiritual warfare incites real-world violence against those labeled as possessed by demons and worries that rhetoric threatens democracy since one cannot negotiate with demons in good faith.

E. Janet Warren argues that the term has gone from its original use as an insightful metaphor in the Bible to losing its sense as a metaphor in modern Christian language.

=== Christian countercult movement ===
The excesses of allegations made in the satanic ritual abuse phenomenon of the 1980s and 1990s have prompted critical reviews of spiritual warfare thought and practices. Some apologists in the Christian countercult movement have expressed concerns that spiritual warfare techniques seem at times to have been based on spurious stories and anecdotes without careful discernment and reflection. Some of these general concerns have been expressed by apologists like Elliot Miller (Christian Research Institute), and Bob and Gretchen Passantino in various articles published in the Christian Research Journal. Others, such as Mike Hertenstein and Jon Trott, have called into question the claims of alleged ex-Satanists like Mike Warnke and Lauren Stratford whose stories have subsequently influenced many popular books about spiritual warfare and the occult. Bill Ellis's work, Raising the Devil, has detected the presence of folkloric stories about the occult and demons circulating in evangelical and charismatic circles, which later become accepted as unquestioned facts.

== Cultural influence ==
Popular fictional portrayals of spiritual warfare are found in novels by Frank E. Peretti, This Present Darkness and Piercing the Darkness, and Darrin J Mason, Ominous.

Spiritual warfare themes are also present in songs by contemporary Christian music (CCM) artists, such as Petra and Carman.

In her book God Gave Rock and Roll to You, religion historian Leah Payne writes:

Many CCM songs...showed keen interest in spiritual warfare, but Peretti's vast, vivid, and rollicking Pentecostal universe came to life on stage with the most potency through Carman's shows. Part Liberace-esque Las Vegas showstopper, part Billy Graham revival preacher, part Rat Pack crooner, Carman's work might best be categorized as 'camp.' His theatrical, over-the-top, gaudy, and sometimes grotesque concerts were multimedia evangelistic extravaganzas meant to impress upon attendees their particular role in resisting and rebuking the devil's work.

In ReelWorksStudios and Liberty University's 2018 film The Trump Prophecy, "victory over demons is paralleled with the mass expulsion of undocumented migrants."

== See also ==
- Apotropaic magic
- Jihad
- Demonization
- Ed Kalnins
- Frank Hammond
- New Testament military metaphors
- War as metaphor
- Prayer warrior
- Thomas Muthee
- World to Come
- Walter Wink
- Spiritual mapping
