= Territorial spirit =

Angels or spirits who rule over certain geographical areas

Territorial spirits are national angels, or demons who rule over certain geographical areas in the world, a concept accepted within the Charismatic movement, Pentecostalism, and Dominionist Kingdom Now theology. This belief has been popularized by the novel This Present Darkness by Frank E. Peretti as well as by the ministry of C. Peter Wagner and the related New Apostolic Reformation. The existence of territorial spirits is viewed as significant in spiritual warfare within these Christian groups. Related is the belief in spiritual mapping in order to locate these demonically controlled regions.

== Biblical context ==
=== Deuteronomy 32:8-9 ===
In both the Septuagint and the Dead Sea Scrolls, Deuteronomy 32:8-9 refers to a time when God divided the nations of the earth among the "sons of God" (Israel is excepted as the special possession of God Himself.) Given the meaning of this phrase in the Book of Job, it is suggested that this is a reference to the origin of territorial spirits who were, at one time, angels administering the earth on God's behalf. Wagner appeals to F. F. Bruce, who points out that the Septuagint reading "implies that the administration of various nations has been parceled out among a corresponding number of angelic powers." The question remains, however, as to whether these spirits are malevolent.

=== Psalm 82 ===
Psalm 82 speaks of "elohim" who are "sons of the most High" and are assigned to judge mankind until dying like men or "falling like one of the princes". Psalm 58 covers similar ground.

=== Daniel 10 ===
Daniel 10 concerns the visitation of a man "His body was like topaz, his face like lightning, his eyes like flaming torches, his arms and legs like the gleam of burnished bronze, and his voice like the sound of a multitude" to the prophet Daniel. This man explains to Daniel that he was delayed by the "Prince of Persia" (10:13), but was helped by "Michael, one of the chief princes" (a reference to Michael the Archangel, who was recognized in Jewish literature to be a chief angel guarding over Israel). Later in the chapter, the man warns Daniel that soon the "Prince of Greece" (10:20) will join his Persian counterpart to make war upon them.

Wagner regards this chapter as a key passage supporting the existence of territorial spirits, and appeals to Keil and Delitzsch, who suggest that the "prince of Persia" is the "guardian spirit of the kingdom." George Otis, coiner of the term spiritual mapping, says that Daniel 10 is "a well-defined case of an evil spiritual being ruling over an area with explicitly defined boundaries." David E. Stevens notes that many scholars take the Prince of Persia to be an earthly political authority, such as Cambyses II. Stevens personally accepts the angelic interpretation, but argues that the "influence exerted by these angelic princes is personal and sociopolitical in nature and not territorial." Stevens notes that in Daniel 12:1, Michael the Archangel, is described as "the great prince who protects your people" (NIV), which "emphasizes the protective role of Michael in relation to the people of God rather than with respect to a given territory. Michael remained the guardian angel of the people of God, whether Israel was in the Promised Land or was dispersed in exile among the nations."

== Usage ==
Territorial spirits are a part of strategic-level spiritual warfare (SLSW) as promoted by New Apostolic Reformation (NAR) leader C. Peter Wagner and others in the movement, which involves the practice of mapping the spiritual and social history of an area in order for prophets to learn the names and assignments of demonic spirits as the first step to effective spiritual warfare. Named demons include Jezebel, Baal, and Leviathan.

The American ReAwaken America Tour was originally a COVID-19 protest, which later became "a rolling Chautauqua-style celebration of the spiritual side of Trumpism" sponsored by Charismatic organizations and featuring NAR speakers. The events took on a spiritual warfare tone including references to territorial spirits; in 2022 pastor Mark Burns spoke of "demonic territory that's over the land" and Roger Stone mentioned a "Satanic portal [appearing] above the White House" after President Joe Biden took office, stating that it "must be closed. And it will be closed by prayer."

== Criticism ==
Melvin Tinker argues that the literary use of territorial spirits is a misnomer, since spirits referred to in various Biblical passages "are to be more associated with political and religious power and ideologies." Opponents of the theological construct of strategic-level spiritual warfare and associated beliefs point out that while the Bible may describe some form of demonic control over geography, it does not prescribe many of the behaviors and teachings that proponents advocate in response.

Scholars such as Robert Priest, Paul Hiebert and A. Scott Moreau, as well as missionary and anthropologist Charles H. Kraft detect animist ideas in the arguments of supporters of the theory of territorial spirits. Robert Guelich of Fuller Theological Seminary does not find the concept of territorial spirits within the Gospels, and has analyzed this problem in a critical review of Frank E. Peretti's novel This Present Darkness. Peretti's second novel, Piercing the Darkness, also features these themes.

== See also ==
- Genius loci
- Classification of demons
- Demonology
- New Apostolic Reformation
- Prayer warrior
- Spirit world (Spiritualism)
- Tutelary deity
