= Jonathan Young (psychologist) =

American mythologist (1944-)

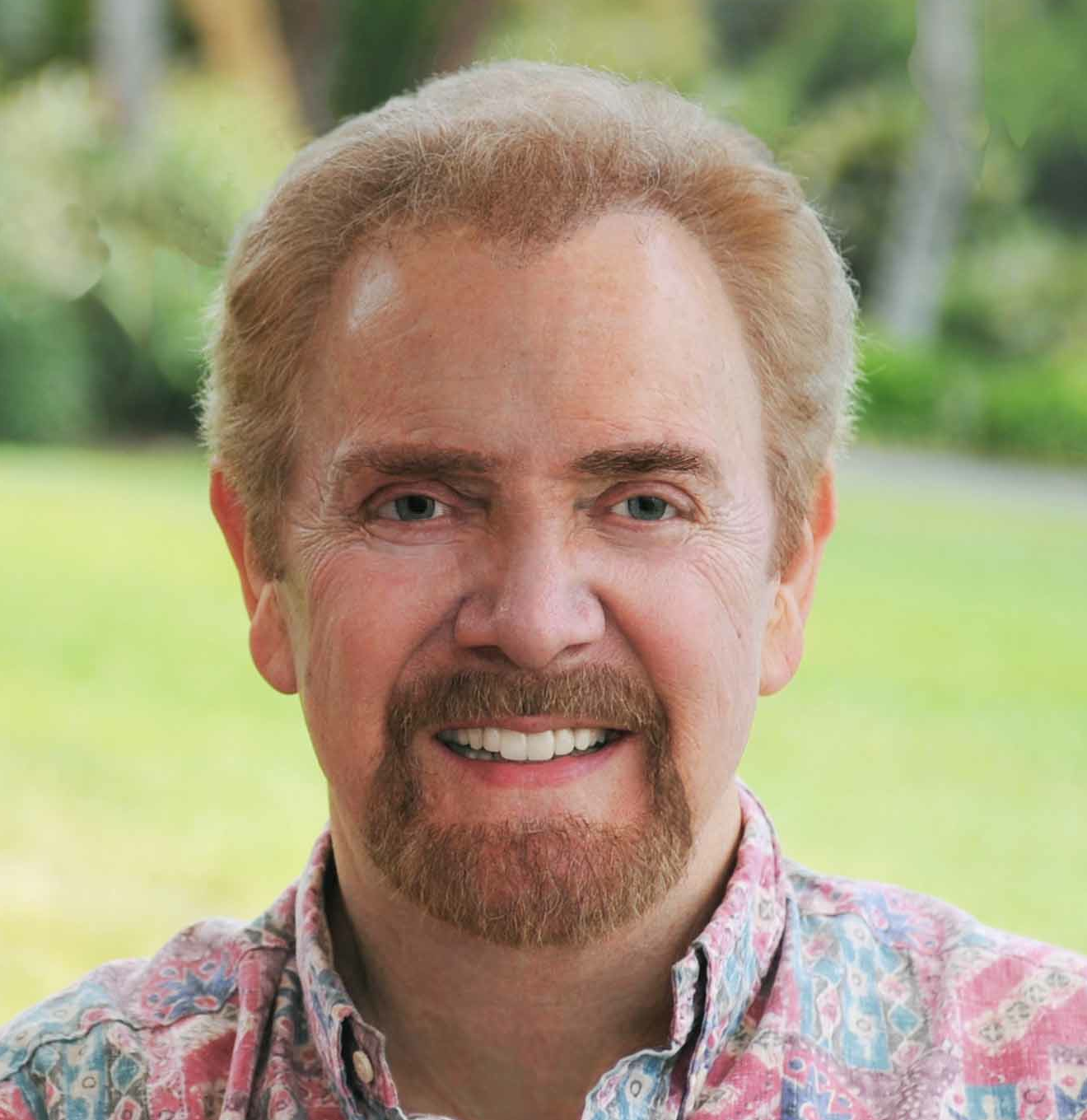
- Young in 2016
- Born: September 29, 1944 (age 81)
- Occupations: Psychologist, writer
- Writing career
- Subjects: Psychology, mythology
- Website: folkstory.com

Jonathan Young (born September 29, 1944) is an American psychologist who was the founding curator of the Joseph Campbell Archives.

== Background ==
Young developed an interest in the teaching functions of stories through early exposure to folklore. He was one of six children in a much-traveled family. His parents read and discussed the lore of each place they visited, such as the Little Mermaid in Copenhagen, the Pied Piper in Hamelin, the Arabian Nights in Baghdad, and the Buddha in India and Japan.

His graduate studies focused on the psychology of stories, and included work with Viktor Frankl, Rollo May, Abraham Maslow, and Carl Rogers. He earned his PhD in Clinical Psychology from Alliant International University.

== Career ==
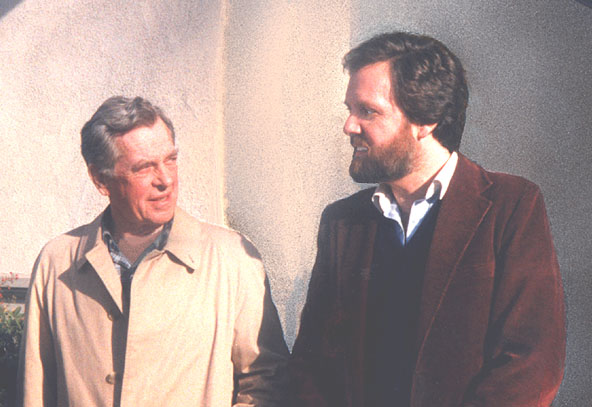
Joseph Campbell with Jonathan Young, 1985.

Young is best known for his series of books, Saga: Best New Writings on Mythology. He assisted mythologist Joseph Campbell for several years at seminars. In addition to the Campbell archives, he organized the collections of psychologist James Hillman, and archaeologist Marija Gimbutas. As a professor, Young created and chaired the Mythological Studies Department at the Pacifica Graduate Institute, working with Jungian theorists such as Robert Bly, Marion Woodman, Robert A. Johnson, Jean Houston, and Thomas Moore (spiritual writer).

In 1995, Young launched the Center for Story and Symbol in Santa Barbara, California to continue the work of Joseph Campbell. Through the center's programs, he presents seminars internationally on the uses of mythic stories for therapists, writers, clergy, and teachers. He also teaches the hero's journey in screenwriting programs. He lectures occasionally at universities, such as UCLA, Notre Dame, and Oxford, as well as courses in Mythopoetics at Pacifica Graduate Institute. He is featured in the History Channel documentary Star Wars: The Legacy Revealed. He also frequently appears on the History Channel and H2 television series Ancient Aliens.

== Works ==
- Saga: Best New Writings on Mythology
- Article on Joseph Campbell, The Dictionary of Modern American Philosophers

== See also ==
- Joseph Campbell
- James Hillman
- Marija Gimbutas
