= John A. Sanford =

- Born: John Arthur Sanford; 26 July 1929; Moorestown Township, Burlington County, New Jersey, United States
- Died: 17 October 2005 (aged 76); San Diego, California, US
- Occupations: Jungian analyst, Episcopal priest, writer
- Notable work: Healing Body And Soul, Dreams: God's Forgotten Language and others
- Movement: Jungian and spiritual psychotherapy
- Parent(s): Edgar L. Sanford, Agnes Sanford

John A. "Jack" Sanford (26 July 1929 – 17 October 2005) was an American Jungian analyst and Episcopal priest.

== Early life ==
John A. Sanford was born in Moorestown, New Jersey, a township in Burlington County. His parents were both leaders in the spiritual healing movement. His father, Edgar L. Sanford, was born in Vermont in 1890 and was an Episcopal priest, as was his own father and grandfather. He was the author of God's Healing Power. His mother was Agnes Sanford (born Agnes Mary White; 1897–1982) who was born in China. She became the founder of the Inner Healing Movement and was the author of The Healing Light. His siblings were Edgar L. Sanford Jr. (born in China in 1925) and Virginia F. Sanford (born in Pennsylvania in 1926).

In his early 20s, Sanford decided to follow his father, grandfather, and two great-grandfathers, and entered the Episcopal Theological Seminary in Cambridge, Massachusetts, to study to be an Episcopal priest. He earned a bachelor's degree in philosophy, graduating Phi Beta Kappa at Kenyon College in Gambier, Ohio. Later on, he obtained an honorary Doctor of Divinity degree from Kenyon, based on his work in the fields of religion and psychology. He studied and mastered Greek mythology, Greek language, and American Indian history.

== Psychoanalytic experience and training ==
In 1955, he was ordained a priest at the Episcopal Theological Seminary in Cambridge, Massachusetts. Later he was deeply influenced by his mentor, Fritz Künkel, himself a disciple of Carl Jung the Swiss psychiatrist and founder of Analytical psychology, of whom Sanford was also a devoted student.

His first ordained ministry position was as assistant priest at St. Luke's Parish in Monrovia, California in 1955. He became rector at Trinity Church in Los Angeles in 1958.

== Personal life ==
Sanford and his wife, Adaline "Lynn", whom he married in 1954, grew weary of the downtown Los Angeles environment and its declining air quality. When he was offered a position at St. Paul's Cathedral near Balboa Park in 1965 he welcomed the move to San Diego.

Sanford worked as a parish priest for 19 years. In 1974, he left parochial ministry for full-time work as a Jungian analyst and psychotherapist, lecturing and authoring a series of books, most of them regarding religion, psychology, Greek mythology, and American Indian history.

Since those years, Sanford enjoyed his private practice as an analyst focusing on psychology, religion and inner growth and he found some time every day for writing his books. He was a mentor for the Journey into Wholeness conferences from their beginning in 1977.

Sanford authored books on serious dream study and interpretation, combining both spirituality and science.

On the lighter side, Sanford also wrote novels, reflecting his interest in American Indian history, lore and legend. He also wrote a piece in an entirely different area: Running with your dogs, in which he reflected an extension of his passion for long-distance running. He ran consistently into his early 70s and completed the Mission Bay Marathon in the 1970s. He was also an avid hiker, backpacking in the Sierras for many years.

Sanford's children are Kathryn and John Stuart Sanford.

== Final days and death ==
During 2002 and 2003, Sanford started showing symptoms of Alzheimer's disease, which became worse with time, so the family decided to move him to a retirement house named Silverado Senior Living in Escondido, California, where he lived his final years and where he died on October 17, 2005, at the age of 76, from Alzheimer's complications.

== Selected bibliography ==
- Dreams: God's Forgotten Language. 1968.
- The Kingdom Within: A Study of the Inner Meaning of Jesus' Sayings. 1970.
- The Man Who Wrestled with God: Light from the Old Testament on the Psychology of Individuation. 1974.
- Healing and Wholeness. 1977.
- Dreams and Healing. 1978.
- The Invisible Partners: How the Male and Female in Each of Us Affects Our Relationships. 1980.
- Evil: The Shadow Side of Reality. 1981.
- The Strange Trial of Mr Hyde: A New Look at the Nature of Human Evil. 1981.
- Between People: Communicating One-To-One. 1982.
- Ministry Burnout. 1982.
- The Man Who Lost His Shadow. 1983.
- Fritz Kunkel: Selected Writings: Edited, with an Introduction and Commentary by John A. Sanford. 1984.
- King Saul, the Tragic Hero: A Study in Individuation. 1985.
- The Song of the Meadowlark: The Story of an American Indian and the Nez Perce War. 1986.
- The Kingdom Within: The Inner Meaning of Jesus' Sayings. 1987., first published in 1970
- What Men are Like (co-authored by George Lough, Ph.D.). 1988.
- Soul Journey: A Jungian Analyst Looks at Reincarnation. 1991.
- Healing Body and Soul. 1992.
- Mystical Christianity: A Psychological Commentary on the Gospel of John. 1994.
- Fate, Love, and Ecstasy: Wisdom from the Lesser-Known Goddesses of the Greeks. 1995.
