= Charles H. Kraft =

American author of Christian related books

Charles Howard Kraft (born July 15, 1932, in Connecticut) is an American anthropologist, linguist, evangelical Christian speaker, and professor emeritus of Anthropology and Intercultural Communication in the School of Intercultural Studies at Fuller Theological Seminary in Pasadena, California, where he taught primarily in the school's spiritual-dynamics concentration. In the domain of religion, his work since the early 1980s has focused on inner healing and spiritual warfare. He joined Fuller's faculty in 1969. In the 1950s he served as a Brethren missionary in northern Nigeria. He has served as a professor of African languages at Michigan State University and UCLA, and taught anthropology part-time at Biola University. He holds a BA from Wheaton College, a BD from Ashland Theological Seminary, and a PhD from the Hartford Seminary Foundation, titled "A Study of Hausa Syntax".

In 1982, with fellow Fuller missions professor Peter Wagner, Kraft became an early proponent of the teaching and ministry models of John Wimber, and helped popularize the "Third Wave of the Holy Spirit", which Wimber's Vineyard Movement represented. He was also an influential figure in the development of spiritual mapping,on the Church Growth movement.

== Main interests ==
Kraft writes and teaches about biblical Christianity and culture (including contextualization), communicating biblical Christianity, anthropology and Christianity, cross-cultural Christian theology, worldview, spiritual warfare, inner healing, generational curses, and Anti-Masonry. In addition to his work at Fuller, Kraft is the president and founder of Deep Healing Ministries, a deliverance ministry, and conducts seminars and exorcisms around the world. He lives in California with his wife. He serves as the vice-president of Hearts Set Free Ministries, where he conducts seminars on spiritual warfare, healing, and deliverance.

His most influential and controversial work is Christianity in Culture (1979). He proposed an approach to contextualization using the "dynamic equivalence" method of Bible translation as a model to describe how Christianity itself must be translated into a culture by adopting new forms that communicate biblical meanings.

He has taught and ministered in Nigeria, Korea, Thailand, Papua New Guinea, Australia, India, Denmark, Norway, England, Holland, New Zealand, South Africa, Canada, Japan, Switzerland, and Germany.

== Selected works ==
Kraft's published books include:

- —. I Give You Authority.
- —. Defeating Dark Angels: Breaking Demonic Oppression in the Believer's Life.
- —. Confronting Powerless Christianity: Evangelicals and the Missing Dimension.
- —. Christianity With Power: Your Worldview and Your Experience of the Supernatural.
- —. Communication Theory for Christian Witness.
- —. Confronting Powerless Christianity: Evangelicals and the Missing Dimension.
- —. The Rules of Engagement: Understanding the Principles that Govern the Spiritual Battles in Our Lives.
- — (1996). Anthropology for Christian Witness. Maryknoll, NY: Orbis Books. ISBN 978-1-57075-085-4.
- —. Behind Enemy Lines: An Advanced Guide to Spiritual Warfare.
- —. Deep Wounds, Deep Healing: Discovering the Vital Link Between Spiritual Warfare and Inner Healing.
- —. Teach Yourself Hausa Complete Course.
- —. Culture, Communication, and Christianity: A Selection of Writings.
- —. Communicating Jesus' Way.
- —. Introductory Hausa.
- —. Deep Wounds, Deep Healing: A Guide to Receiving and Praying for Inner Healing.
- —. A Hausa reader: Cultural materials with helps for use in teaching intermediate and advanced Hausa.
- —. Readings in Dynamic Indigeneity.
- —. Chadic wordlists (Marburger Studien zur Afrika- und Asienkunde).
- — (1979). Christianity in Culture: A Study in Dynamic Biblical Theologizing in Cross-Cultural Perspective. Revised 2005
- — (October 2010). Two Hours to Freedom: A Simple and Effective Model for Healing and Deliverance.
- — (2016). Issues in Contextualization.
- — (2024). Missiology with Power: A Missing Dimension in Intercultural Ministry.
