= Wolfgang Metzger =

Wolfgang Metzger (born 22 July 1899 in Heidelberg, Germany; died 20 December 1979 in Bebenhausen, Germany) is considered one of the main representatives of Gestalt psychology (Gestalt theory) in Germany.

Metzger's most widely acclaimed work is Psychologie: Die Entwicklung ihrer Grundannahmen seit der Einführung des Experiments (Psychology: The development of basic principles since the introduction of the experimental method). It portrays systematically the foundations of psychology, including the different kinds of psychological reality, the problems associated with reference systems, order, and much more. Pivotal in its discussions is the cumulative knowledge, at that time, of the entire Gestalt school.

== Biography ==
Metzger was a student and associate of the founders of the Berlin school of Gestalt theory, Max Wertheimer, Wolfgang Köhler and Kurt Koffka. Metzger became Max Wertheimer's assistant in Frankfurt/Main in the 1930s and his successor when the Nazis forced Wertheimer out. Early in the 1940s Metzger became chairman at Münster, a position he held until his retirement.

Wolfgang Metzger joined the SA in 1933, and became a member of the NSDAP in 1937.

The early major work Gesetze des Sehens (Laws of Seeing) first appeared in serial part issues, edited by the Senckenbergische Naturforschende Gesellschaft in Frankfurt. Expanded editions were printed in 1936, 1954, and 1975. In this work Metzger supplemented his collection of phenomena from everyday perception and the fine arts, always endeavoring to find ever more compelling illustrations for the Gestalt point of view. As Heinz Heckhausen has pointed out this work is a masterpiece for those who come to it without an intense background in the psychology of perception; in a nontechnical style Metzger moves the reader toward a deeper experience, and sometimes an altered conception, of the visual world.

Following World War II Metzger devoted increasing energy to applied questions, especially those having to do with child-rearing, classroom education, and psychotherapy. His guiding principles in these applied endeavors were developed in his last two books, Schöpferische Freiheit (Productive freedom, 1949, 1962) and Psychologie in der Erziehung (Psychology in education, 1971). The theoretical starting point of these works is again Gestalt psychology with its assumption of a natural, nonforced order in nature, which led him to make his observations on the virtues of a theme of freedom among the goals of education. Metzger became eventually an outspoken advocate of Adlerian psychology with which he had become acquainted during his Berlin days through Fritz Künkel and later through Oliver Brachfeld who was in Münster from 1960 to 1965. Together with Brachfeld he founded in 1964 the German Alfred Adler Society which became in 1970 the German Society for Individual Psychology.

Metzger was president of the 16th International Congress for Psychology in 1960 in Bonn. From 1962 until 1964, he was president of the Deutsche Gesellschaft für Psychologie. He was also highly committed to activities associated with his membership in the Association de Psychologie de la Langue Française. Metzger's legacy is carried forth in the Society for Gestalt Theory and its Applications (GTA), an international multidisciplinary organization, of which he was honorary chairman.
