= Jill Mellick =

Australian clinical psychologist

- Born: Australia
- Occupations: Psychologist, author, artist

Jill Mellick was a Jungian-oriented clinical psychologist, expressive arts therapist, researcher and author; and a founding member of the International Expressive Arts Therapy Association (IEATA).

In 2019, the OPUS Archives, at Pacifica Graduate Institute, in California, added The Jill Mellick Collection to their archives, which house the collections of Joseph Campbell, Marija Gimbutas, James Hillman, Marion Woodman, and other prominent scholars in the fields of depth psychology, mythology and the humanities.

== Biography ==
A daughter of Stan Mellick and his wife Letty Katts, Mellick was raised in Australia. She graduated from Somerville House in 1965 and completed her first degree in English language and literature at the University of Queensland.

She developed graduate studies in transpersonal psychology, as founder of the Creative Expression philosophy program, at the Institute of Transpersonal Psychology (ITP), in California (renamed Sofia University).

Mellick's research has included dreams, creative expression for personal growth and development, Carl Jung and The Red Book, and Pueblo Indian art and artists.

Mellick and Marion Woodman collaborated across several decades, starting in the 1990s; they led retreats and co-authored publications.

Mellick died on December 20, 2022.

== Notable publications ==
- The Red Book Hours: Discovering C.G. Jung’s Art Mediums and Creative Process. Zürich: Scheidegger & Spiess, 2018. ISBN 9783858818164
- “Matter and Method in The Red Book: Selected Findings,” in The Foundation of the Works of C. G. Jung, The Art of C. G. Jung. New York: W. W. Norton Inc., 2018. ISBN 9780393254877
- The Art of Dreaming: Tools for Creative Dream Work. Berkeley, CA: Conari Press, 2001. ISBN 9781609253325
- Coming Home to Myself: Reflections for Nurturing a Woman’s Body and Soul (co-authored with Marion Woodman) Berkeley, CA: Conari Press, 1998. ISBN 9781573241007
- The Natural Artistry of Dreams: Creative Ways to Bring the Wisdom of Dreams to Waking Life. Berkeley, CA: Conari Press, 1996. ISBN 9780809560585
- The Worlds of P’otsunu: Geronima Cruz Montoya of San Pueblo (co-authored with Jeanne Shutes). Albuquerque, NM: University of New Mexico Press, 1996. (Japanese edition 2004, trans. Asayo Iino.) ISBN 9780826316431
- Treating the Alcoholic: A Developmental Model of Recovery (co-edited with Stephanie Brown). New York: John Wiley and Sons, 1985 (1st ed.). ISBN 9780471817369
