= Robert A. Johnson (psychotherapist) =

American psychotherapist and author (1921–2018)

- Born: May 26, 1921; Portland, Oregon, U.S.
- Died: September 12, 2018 (aged 97); San Diego, California, U.S.
- Education: University of Oregon; Stanford University
- Occupations: Psychotherapist, author
- Writing career
- Notable work: He: Understanding Masculine Psychology

Robert Alex Johnson (May 26, 1921 – September 12, 2018) was an American Jungian analyst and author. His books have sold more than three million copies.

== Life and career ==
Johnson was born in Portland, Oregon. He studied at the University of Oregon and Stanford University. In 1945, he went to Ojai, California, as a student of Jiddu Krishnamurti, an Indian spiritual teacher. In 1947 he began his own therapy with Fritz Künkel. He later studied at the C. G. Jung Institute in Zürich, Switzerland, where Emma Jung, the wife of C. G. Jung, was his principal analyst. He completed his analytical training with Künkel and Tony Sussman. He established an analytical practice in Los Angeles in the early 1950s with Helen Luke. In the early 1960s he closed his practice and became a member of St. Gregory's Abbey, Three Rivers, in Michigan, a Benedictine monastery of the Episcopal Church.

After four years in the monastery, Johnson returned to California in 1967. He resumed his career as a psychotherapist and lectured at St. Paul's Cathedral in San Diego, working closely with John A. Sanford, an Episcopal priest, Jungian analyst, and author. In 1974, a collection of his lectures was published as He: Understanding Masculine Psychology. The book became a bestseller after Harper & Row acquired the rights. He was the first of many books giving a Jungian interpretation, in accessible language, of earlier myths and stories and their parallels with psychology and personal development.

Johnson was interviewed by Caroline Jones on her Radio National program, The Search for Meaning.

Johnson also studied at the Sri Aurobindo Ashram in Pondicherry, India. In 2002 he received an honorary doctorate in humanities and a lifetime achievement award from Pacifica Graduate Institute.

Johnson lived in San Diego, California, where he died in September 2018 at the age of 97.

== Works ==
- He: Understanding Masculine Psychology (1974)
- She: Understanding Feminine Psychology (1976)
- We: Understanding the Psychology of Romantic Love (1983)
- Inner Work: Using Dreams and Active Imagination for Personal Growth (1986)
- Ecstasy: Understanding the Psychology of Joy (1989)
- Transformation: Understanding the Three Levels of Masculine Consciousness (1991)
- Femininity Lost and Regained (1991)
- Owning Your Own Shadow: Understanding the Dark Side of the Psyche (1991)
- The Fisher King and the Handless Maiden (1993)
- Lying with the Heavenly Woman (1995)
- Balancing Heaven and Earth: A Memoir of Visions, Dreams, and Realizations (1998) by Robert A. Johnson and Jerry M. Ruhl
- Contentment: A Way to True Happiness (1999) by Robert A. Johnson and Jerry M. Ruhl
- Living Your Unlived Life (2007) by Robert A. Johnson and Jerry M. Ruhl
- The Golden World, Audiobook (2007)
- Inner Gold: Understanding Psychological Projection (2008) by Robert A. Johnson and Arnie Kotler
- In Search of The Holy Grail, Video (1991)
