= Theophostic Prayer Ministry =

Counseling service

Transformational Prayer Ministry (formerly Theophostic counseling) was developed in the United States during the mid-1990s by Ed Smith, a Baptist minister.

Its name comes from the Greek theo ('God') and quasi-Greek phostic ('light'), and it is often associated with the Christian Inner Healing Movement. Smith says people are being delivered from phobias, depression, anxiety disorders, obsessive–compulsive disorder, dissociative personality disorder, attention deficit hyperactivity disorder, sexual addiction, eating disorders, post-traumatic stress disorder, and homosexuality through Theophostic principles. The name Theophostic is a registered trademark.

Few empirical evaluations of Theophostic ministry are available, although Christian psychologist Fernando Garzon says that current case study and survey data has yielded clinically significant changes in client symptom levels, and high degrees of client and practitioner satisfaction.

== Definition ==
Smith's definition of Theophostic Prayer Ministry is that "Theophostic is a ministry of helping emotionally wounded people to acknowledge and to identify the true source of their inner emotional pain and find lasting peace through receiving personalized truth directly from the Lord."

== Process ==
Participants in a typical Theophostic Prayer Ministry session are the ministry recipient, a ministry facilitator and optionally a prayer partner.

The ministry facilitator ensures that the ministry recipient understands the process before the session begins.

The facilitator begins the session with a prayer of encouragement.

The ministry recipient closes their eyes and concentrates on feeling the emotional pain from which they are seeking relief. The purpose of focusing on the emotion is to allow their mind to drift back to a related memory. That memory is of a situation that the recipient regards as painful and which they have interpreted to form a belief about themself or their situation. The event that is contained in the memory may have occurred many years ago, for example in the person's childhood. The emotion provides a bridge to the belief.

The ministry recipient describes the memory to the facilitator. The facilitator asks the recipient some questions that will enable the recipient to drill down to the core belief housed in this memory that is troubling them. The questions are not leading questions, as the facilitator does not assume anything about the memory's content. Rather they are open questions, posed to help the recipient himself to identify the core belief. This core belief is known in TPM parlance as a "lie" that causes lie-based pain. The lie arises from the recipient's interpretation of the situation. For example, a rape victim may have formed a belief that they are dirty or shameful, whereas they were actually an innocent victim. Though their belief is false, it has the same impact on their emotional state now as if it were true.

Once the recipient has identified the core troublesome belief, the facilitator prays, asking Jesus to provide the recipient with his perspective, that is, what he would like the recipient to know. According to TPM, Jesus answers that prayer in various ways. Jesus might provide his truth to the recipient by means of a mental picture, a feeling, a scripture, a word, a realization, or some other way. The truth received from Jesus replaces the painful lie previously believed, and the result is peace.

TPM says that every person believes not just one but many lies of the kind that lead to present emotional pain. Each lie can be eliminated with the same process.

== Research ==
In his 2008 book, Fernando Garzon, an associate professor in the Center for Counselling and Family Studies at Liberty University, describes his team's two-year-long outcomes-based case study research project that evaluated TPM. The research team found very clear preliminary results that showed a correlation between TPM treatment and symptom reductions. Garzon wrote that the case studies strongly support the need for randomized comparative or control group studies.

Garzon had conducted preliminary practitioner studies in 2001 which showed promise, concluding that "...outcome-based case studies and randomized clinical trials should proceed on TPM to ascertain whether the therapeutic perception of efficacy displayed in this survey actually has merit..." He also found that a wide variety of people were practicing Theophostic ministry at that time, including pastors, lay counselors, and psychologists. According to Garzon, this raised questions about some practitioners' level of training.

A Kentucky journalist has associated Theophostic Prayer Ministry with recovered-memory therapy (RMT), an approach now widely discredited after discovery of false memory phenomena on the basis that Theophostic Prayer Ministry also presupposes the possibility of repression or memory inhibition, A critical entry from Ontario Consultants on Religious Tolerance also associates Theophostic ministry with recovered-memory therapy, although the article does not identify the aspects of Theophostic Prayer Ministry that merit the assertion. It also claims that Theophostic Prayer Ministry has added beliefs about demonic possession, Satanic influence, direct communication with "Jesus Christ or the Holy Spirit" and "unique concepts about the inner workings of the mind". However, Smith himself strongly repudiates Recovered Memory Therapy, and in recent years he has taught that it is counter-productive to pursue or even allow demonic confrontations in a ministry session. However, in his Basic Training Seminar Manual and in each of the training videos, Smith warns strongly against making any suggestions that might affect the actual content of a memory, and he lists ten ways in which TPM differs from RMT. Nevertheless, once a core belief about self has been identified through the memory (not in the memory per se), Smith does "invite the Lord" to speak truth to the ministry recipient concerning that belief.

In an article about TPM in the Christian Research Journal, Elliot Miller said that to accuse TPM of practicing recovered memory therapy and visualization is to betray ignorance or bias against TPM that refuses to be corrected by clear and consistent facts.

A Christian psychologist, David Entwistle, has expressed concerns with its practice: "TPM follows in the lineage of 'healing of memory' techniques, though it departs from that lineage in a number of important respects. Numerous concerns exist surrounding insufficient attempts to ground TPM in biblical concepts; inadequate and often flawed explanations of basic psychological processes; dubious claims about the prevalence of [dissociative identity disorder, Satanic ritual abuse], and demonic activity; estimates of traumatic abuse that exceed empirical findings; and the failure to sufficiently appreciate the possibility of iatrogenic memory contamination".

Entwistle raises concern over empirical validity, with questions about literal appearances of God, as Entwistle interprets claimed perceptions of truth, including spontaneous visualizations of Christ; ethical and legal issues relating to guarantees of healing; application of TPM to a variety of mental disorders without empirical validation; the legal question of whether it should be considered a religious intervention or a counseling procedure – and whether this was settled by changing the name from Theophostic counseling to Theophostic ministry; and the failure of Smith to welcome public analysis and critique of TPM.

In Cumberland, Maine, sexual-abuse charges against ex-member Tom Wright were brought after a church member's memory surfaced during Theophostic sessions of Wright allegedly abusing a child. When the case went to trial in 2002, the charges were thrown out by the district attorney because evidence was based on 'unconventional and biased therapeutic methods'. The district attorney noted that these methods were considered unreliable by the American Psychological Society. In 2006, in Australia, a psychologist was found guilty of malpractice by the Queensland Health Practitioners Tribunal for using Theophostic methods. The tribunal found that Irene Moreau, who practiced from a Christian counselling centre in Brisbane, 'inappropriately used Theophostic Prayer Ministry as a counselling technique'.

Practitioners of techniques such as TPM frequently do not have formal training in psychology or counseling, although Fernando Garzon suggests that this in many cases may be beneficial, saying: "...it may serve people who might not get help otherwise, cannot afford professional therapy, do not wish to use insurance, or have access to counseling limited by managed care. Others belong to churches in which the pastor is either not trained, not interested, or not available (due to having too many other pastoral duties) to meet the needs for pastoral counseling. Still others simply may trust lay people, whom they know, more than a therapist, whom they do not know. In addition, the training itself may benefit the lay counselors spiritually and emotionally."

In addition to questions about the efficacy, safety and reliability of TPM, it has also divided Christian observers with regard to the soundness of its theology. In the conclusion of their paper "A theological analysis of Theophostic Ministry", Bryan Maier and Philip Monroe put it this way: "...on the issues of sin and healing, the question remains for Christian counselors and the evangelical community as a whole as to whether Smith's 'theological basis' is consistent with responsible biblical doctrine. We do not think that Smith has warrant to make this claim. Furthermore, we think these differences are so significant that we advise great caution before engaging in this ministry – whether as a client or as facilitator."

== See also ==
- Christian counseling
- Nouthetic counseling
