= Letty Katts =

Australian songwriter

Violet Katts (3 January 1919 – 19 September 2007), was an Australian songwriter who published under the name Letty Katts, often spelled Lettie. She is best known for her songs "A Town Like Alice" (1956) and "Never Never" (1945), frequently referred to as "Riding to the Never Never".

== History ==
Katts was born in 1919, the only daughter of Anton Katts (22 January 1888 – March 1952) and Lucretia Katts, née Pimblett, who married on 11 June 1921. Anton was born in Ostrog, Russia, (perhaps Ostrog, Šentjernej) and in 1912 left as a refugee for Australia, and founded a radiator repair and sheet metal fabrication shop "King & Katts" at 623 Wickham Street, Fortitude Valley, Queensland.

Around 1925 they built a large house, "Roseneath", in Enoggera where Letty grew up. (Note: The house, at 12 Gizeh Street, Enoggera, remained in the family until 1975, and has been preserved as an example of inter-war architecture.) Both parents were musicians: Anton played balalaika and mandolin; Lucretia was a pianist, and Katts had private piano tuition, initially with Constance Hartshorn, organist for the Enoggera Presbyterian church, then from around 1930 with John Ellis, who took out a newspaper advertisement when Kitts graduated ATCL and LTCL in 1939.

Katts married John Stanton Davis Mellick (born 22 February 1920), on 8 December 1941. Katts worked as a music teacher while her husband was overseas during the War.

Known as Stanton, or Stan, Mellick, he had a distinguished career in the army, and was promoted to Major. After the war he studied pharmacy, and had a successful practice in the town. He later became a senior lecturer at the University of Queensland and was awarded an OAM in 2005. They had one daughter, Jill Mellick (born 29 August 1948).

== Compositions ==
- "Never Never" (Note: "Never Never" is an Australian term for the seemingly endless isolated inland of the country.) won for her a prize of £100 (perhaps $5,000 in today's money) in a contest conducted by the Australian Federation of Broadcasting Stations in March 1945. The song was regularly performed on Australian radio stations, and topped the "hit parade" (Note: In those days popularity of a song was judged by the number of copies of sheet music sold.) for many weeks in 1946. Its first recording was made by Donald Novis with the Bobby Limb orchestra in 1951 and released in Australia in January 1952.
- "A Town Like Alice" was written independently of the film A Town Like Alice but Chappell & Co., her publishers, organised for it to be played in conjunction with the film's premiere in Sydney and became the first all-Australian composition to top the hit parade. Its first gramophone recording was by French-Australian Red Perksey and his orchestra, with vocals by Ray Dickson. Many other artists followed, including Slim Dusty, through to Warren H. Williams and Ted Egan 50-odd years later.
- Numerous artists recorded "Never Never" and "A Town Like Alice" 1944–1986.
- In July 2007, Letty Katts spoke to John Nutting from ABC (Australian Broadcasting Corporation) radio about the background to her composition "Never Never"; the interview was broadcast in October 2007.

Other published compositions include

- "I Put My Hand in My Pocket"

Held by the National Library of Australia:
- "Riding Home" (piano duet)
- "This Is Sydney"
- "A Day in the Bush" (eight little songs for children)
- "West of the Great Divide"
- "The Gallop" (piano duet)
- "Toy Soldiers" (piano solo)
- "By the Billabong" (piano duet)
- "Ship Ahoy" (piano duet)

Two high-profile compositions, mentioned in Narelle McCoy's presentation at the State Library (see External links, below) are:

- "This Old Town" for Graham Kennedy
- "This Is Sydney" for Barry Crocker

Katts' compositions listed by the Australian Performing Right Association to 13 April 1988 are:

- Adelaide
- At the End of the Day
- Because of You
- Bells
- Butterflies
- By the Billabong
- Campbell Town
- Climb a Mountain
- The Dancers
- A Day in the Bush
- Dive, Dive, Dive
- Doll's Lullaby
- The Emu
- For Now I Know
- Good Morning
- Goodnight
- Grenfell
- I Put My Hands in My Pockets
- I Ride Alone
- I'll Ask Her
- I'm Going Back
- The Kangaroo
- The Koala
- The Kookaburra
- Lady Moon
- The Little World
- Long Shadows
- Lost
- Love Will Teach You
- May Shouldn't Marry December
- The Madoke
- The Music Box
- My Heart's Saying Yes
- Never Never [corrected from Never, Never]
- Night Song
- Now You Are Marching Home
- Old Man of the Sea
- On the Beach
- On the Lake
- The Orchid
- Our Evermore
- The Pedestal Song
- Playtime
- The Possum
- Raindrops
- Reading the Paper
- Riding Home
- The River
- S.S. Make Believe
- Sailing into the Sunset
- Sailors' Song
- The See-Saw [corrected from Sea-Saw]
- Ship Ahoy
- The Shiralee
- Sunshine Express
- Tender Loving Care
- There's Beauty Everywhere
- They Also Serve
- They Can't Ration Love
- This Is Sydney
- This Old Town
- The Timeless Land
- A Town Like Alice

== Recognition ==
The State Library of Queensland now holds the Letty Katts collection, 1935-2006. This collection documents the creative life of the Queensland composer and comprises compositions, arrangements, correspondence, certificates, newspaper clippings, personal items, video and sound recordings.

The biennial Letty Katts Fellowship was established by Stan Mellick in 2016 to support research into Queensland's music history, and consists of a stipend of $5,000 plus twelve months' access to the Neil Roberts Research Lounge at the State Library of Queensland and documents held by the Library. In 2020, the Letty Katts Fellowship was awarded to Narelle McCoy, whose thesis was "Musicians Should Be Heard and Not Seen: the life and music of Letty Katts".

The Australia Music Centre holds nine manuscripts of songs by Letty Katts, with a digital master at National Library of Australia.
