= Agnes Sanford =

American Christian writer

Agnes Mary Sanford (November 4, 1897 – February 21, 1982) was an American Christian writer. She is most known for founding the Inner Healing Movement, a process she described as the healing of memories.

== Early life and education ==
Sanford was born in Kashing, China to parents Dr. and Mrs. Hugh W. White who were Southern Presbyterian missionaries. As a child she was taught the doctrine of Cessationism, which declared that miracles—especially healing—had been temporary for the New Testament Church and then had immediately ceased.

Educated mostly at home, she attended the Shanghai American School for one year as a teenager before leaving to the United States to study at the Peace Institute, a Presbyterian women's college in Raleigh, NC. After three years there, she received her certificate in education. Since the teaching certification only allowed her to teach in North Carolina, she attended Agnes Scott College. She planned on receiving her bachelor's degree, but after learning she would be required to take courses in math, science, and French, she switched to a non-degree program so she could take courses in short-story writing, poetry, and art. She then returned to China where she taught English at the Presbyterian mission station before teaching at St. Mary's School and then the Soochow Academy, both Episcopal schools in Shanghai.

== Career ==
Sanford became interested in spiritual healing after she moved back to the United States, settling in Moorestown, New Jersey after her husband Rev. Edgar Sanford accepted a pulpit. She began writing and later lecturing on the topic. She published her first book, The Healing Light, more than a decade prior to the recognized emergence of the Charismatic Movement, and it is often considered a classic in its field. Written from a scientific and metaphysical perspective, it appealed to a wide audience by connecting with those seeking a balanced, mediated position. It had already circulated enough by the 1960s to be considered by some to be the movement's main source for a practical theology of healing prayer. Agnes became a regular speaker at Camps Farthest Out conferences, and has often been referenced by well-known authors, such as Francis MacNutt, John Sandford, and Leanne Payne.

Sanford was a leader in restoring healing prayers to mainline Protestant communities, campaigning against cessationism. She is recognized as the founder of the Inner Healing Movement, a type of prayer geared toward healing of memories and emotions. Because of her membership in the Episcopal Church, Agnes had a profound effect upon Christians who otherwise might not accept the validity of the Baptism of the Holy Spirit and the continuation of the Gifts of the Spirit.

After living 23 years in Moorestown, Rev. Sanford accepted a position at a smaller church in Westboro, Massachusetts so he and Agnes would have more time for lecturing. They co-founded the School for Pastoral Care in 1958, where they held sessions in Eastern Massachusetts and other places by invitation. These were first intended for clergy but were then open up to lay people. At these sessions, Agnes would lay hands on people in order to help them heal from the ailments.

These factors together resulted in her having a foundational impact on the early Charismatic Movement. In these respects, Sanford became a significant and foundational part of the Renewal Movement in the first half of the twentieth century.

== Publications ==
- The Healing Light. St. Paul: MacAlester Park Publishing Company. 1947. ISBN 978-0-910924-36-8. (Note: Later editions removed the subtitle "On the Art and Method of Spiritual Healing from the Christian Viewpoint and in the Christian Tradition")
- Oh Watchman!. Philadelphia: J. B. Lippincott & Co. 1950.
- Lost Shepherd: A Moving Novel of Life in the Spirit. New York: J. B. Lippincott & Co. 1953. ISBN 978-0-91210677-9.
- Let's Believe. New York: Harper & Row. 1954.
- A Pasture for Peterkin. Saint Paul: Macalester Park. 1956.
- Behold Your God. St. Paul: Macalester Park. 1958.
- Dreams Are for Tomorrow. Philadelphia: J. B. Lippincott & Co. 1963.
- "Spiritual Healing". The Church's Ministry of Healing: A Manual for Clergy and Laity. Los Angeles: The Episcopal Church. 1964.
- How to Learn (Booklet). Cincinnati: Forward Movement Publications. 1965.
- The Second Mrs. Wu. Philadelphia: J. B. Lippincott & Co. 1965.
- Healing Gifts of the Spirit. New York: J. B. Lippincott & Co. 1966.
- The Rising River. New York: J. B. Lippincott & Co. 1968.
- The Healing Power of the Bible. San Francisco: Harper & Row. 1969.
- "The Healing of Memories". Guideposts Magazine. Vol. 24, no. 9. 1969.
- Harrell, Irene Burk, ed. (1970). "Birth on Death Row". God Ventures: True Accounts of God in the Lives of Men. Plainfield: Word Books.
- Twice Seven Words. Plainfield: Logos. 1971.
- "Thy Kingdom Come". Weekly Unity. Vol. 63, no. 9. 1971.
- Sealed Orders. South Plainfield: Bridge-Logos Publishers. 1972.
- "Seeking Earnestly the Best Gifts". New Covenant. Vol. 3, no. 5. 1973.
- Route 1. Plainfield: Logos International. 1975.
- Melissa and the Little Red Book. Saint Paul: Macalester Park. 1976.
- Creation Waits. Plainfield: Logos International. 1978.

== Personal life ==
While teaching at Episcopal schools in Shanghai, Sanford met Rev. Edgar L. (Ted) Sanford. They married and continued to live in China for two years. Rev. Sanford was asked to become minister of Trinity Church in Moorestown, New Jersey, so they returned to the U.S. and lived there for 23 years. They then moved to Westboro, Massachusetts when Rev. Sanford accepted a pulpit at St. Stephens Church. He died in 1960. They had three children.
