= Marion Woodman =

Canadian psychoanalyst (1928–2018)

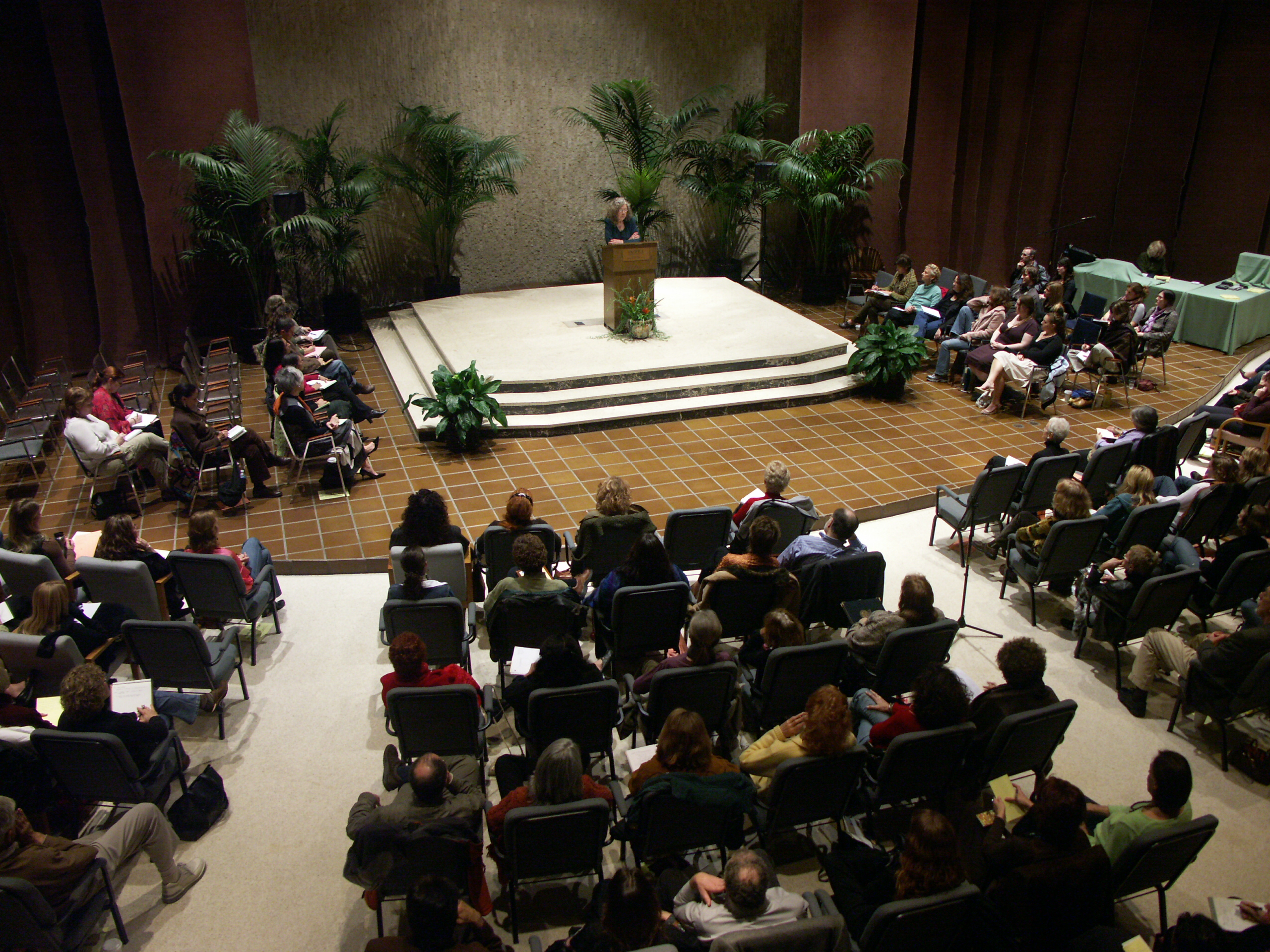
- Pacifica Graduate Institute. Public program at Pacifica led by Marion Woodman.
- Born: Marion Jean Boa; August 15, 1928; London, Ontario, Canada
- Died: July 9, 2018 (aged 89); London, Ontario, Canada
- Occupation: Nonfiction writer
- Spouse: Ross Woodman (?-2014; his death)
- Relatives: Bruce Boa (brother) Fraser Boa (brother)
- Writing career
- Subjects: Psychology, eating disorders, women's issues, sexuality
- Website: www.mwoodmanfoundation.org

Marion Jean Woodman (née Boa; August 15, 1928 – July 9, 2018) was a Canadian mythopoeic author, poet, analytical psychologist and women's movement figure. She wrote and spoke extensively about the dream theories of Carl Jung. Her works include Addiction to Perfection, The Pregnant Virgin and Bone: Dying into Life.

== Early life and education ==
Woodman was born on August 15, 1928, in London, Ontario, the eldest of three children of Ila (née Phinn) and Andrew Boa, a clergyman. She loved being a minister's kid, describing her childhood in the early 1940s as "being the heart of the parsonage life - the daily routine of birth, marriage and death" in the 1977 Forest United Church history book. She completed a degree in English literature at the University of Western Ontario. Later in life she studied psychology at the C. G. Jung Institute in Zürich, Switzerland.

== Career ==
Woodman taught high school English for more than twenty years. Suffering from anorexia, she took a sabbatical with her husband, a college professor, and traveled first to India and then to England, where she became interested in the theories of Carl Jung. She entered analysis with Jung's British colleague, E. A. Bennet. She subsequently enrolled in the C. G. Jung Institute in Zürich, and trained as an analyst.

In 1982, Woodman wrote a book about analytic psychology, Addiction to Perfection, which was published by the new company, Inner City Books, set up by her colleague Daryl Sharp.

Woodman continued to write on the subject of feminine psychology, focusing on psyche and soma. She has also lectured internationally. She has written collaboratively with Thomas Moore, Jill Mellick and Robert Bly.

Woodman was listed in Watkins' Mind Body Spirit Magazine in 2012 as the 100th most spiritually influential living person. Her collection of audio and visual lectures, correspondence, and manuscripts are housed at the Pacifica Graduate Institute, OPUS Archives and Research Center, in Santa Barbara, California.

== Personal life ==
Her husband Ross Woodman was Professor at the University of Western Ontario. He is the author of The Apocalyptic Vision in the Poetry of Shelley, and Sanity, Madness, Transformation: The Psyche in Romanticism, both published by the University of Toronto Press. Ross Woodman died at their home in London, Ontario, on 20 March 2014.

Her younger brothers were the actor Bruce Boa and the Jungian analyst Fraser Boa, both of whom predeceased her.

In November, 1993, Woodman was diagnosed with uterine cancer. She recorded the subsequent two years of cancer treatment in a journal, which was later published as Bone: Dying into Life. She died at her home in London, Ontario, on July 9, 2018, aged 89.

== Notable books ==
- The Owl Was a Baker's Daughter : Obesity, Anorexia Nervosa, and the Repressed Feminine, 1980 Inner City Books. ISBN 0-919123-03-1
- Addiction to Perfection : The Still Unravished Bride, 1982 Inner City Books. ISBN 0-919123-11-2
- The Pregnant Virgin : A Process of Psychological Transformation, 1985 Inner City Books. ISBN 0-919123-20-1
- The Ravaged Bridegroom : Masculinity in Women, 1990 Inner City Books. ISBN 0-919123-42-2
- Leaving My Father's House : A Journey to Conscious Femininity (co-authored with Kate Danson, Mary Hamilton, Rita Greer Allen), 1992 Shambhala Publications. ISBN 0-87773-896-3 (PB edition)
- Conscious Femininity : Interviews With Marion Woodman, 1993 Inner City Books. ISBN 0-919123-59-7
- Dancing in the Flames : The Dark Goddess in the Transformation of Consciousness (co-authored with Elinor Dickson), 1996 Shambhala Publications. ISBN 1-57062-313-9 (PB edition)
- The Maiden King : The Reunion of Masculine and Feminine (co-authored with Robert Bly), November 1998, Henry Holt & Co; ISBN 0-8050-5777-3
- Bone: Dying Into Life, 2000 Viking Compass. ISBN 9780670893744
- Sitting by the Well: Bringing the Feminine to Consciousness Through Language, Dreams and Metaphor, 2000 Sounds True (audiobook) ISBN 978-1-56455-803-9
- Coming Home to Myself : Daily Reflections for a Woman's Body and Soul (co-authored with Jill Mellick), April 2001 (paperback ed.) Conari Press. ISBN 1-57324-566-6
- The Art of Dreaming, by Jill Mellick (with a foreword by Woodman), 2001 Conari Press. ISBN 1573245747
