= Pacifica Graduate Institute =

Private for-profit graduate school in Santa Barbara, California

- Motto: Animae mundi colendae gratia
- Motto in English: For the sake of tending the soul of the world
- Type: Private for-profit graduate school
- Established: 1976
- Location: Santa Barbara, California, United States
- Campus: Urban
- Website: pacifica.edu

Pacifica Graduate Institute is a private for-profit graduate school with two campuses near Santa Barbara, California. The institute offers masters and doctoral degrees in the fields of clinical psychology, counseling, mythological studies, depth psychology, and the humanities. The institute is accredited by the WASC Senior College and University Commission.

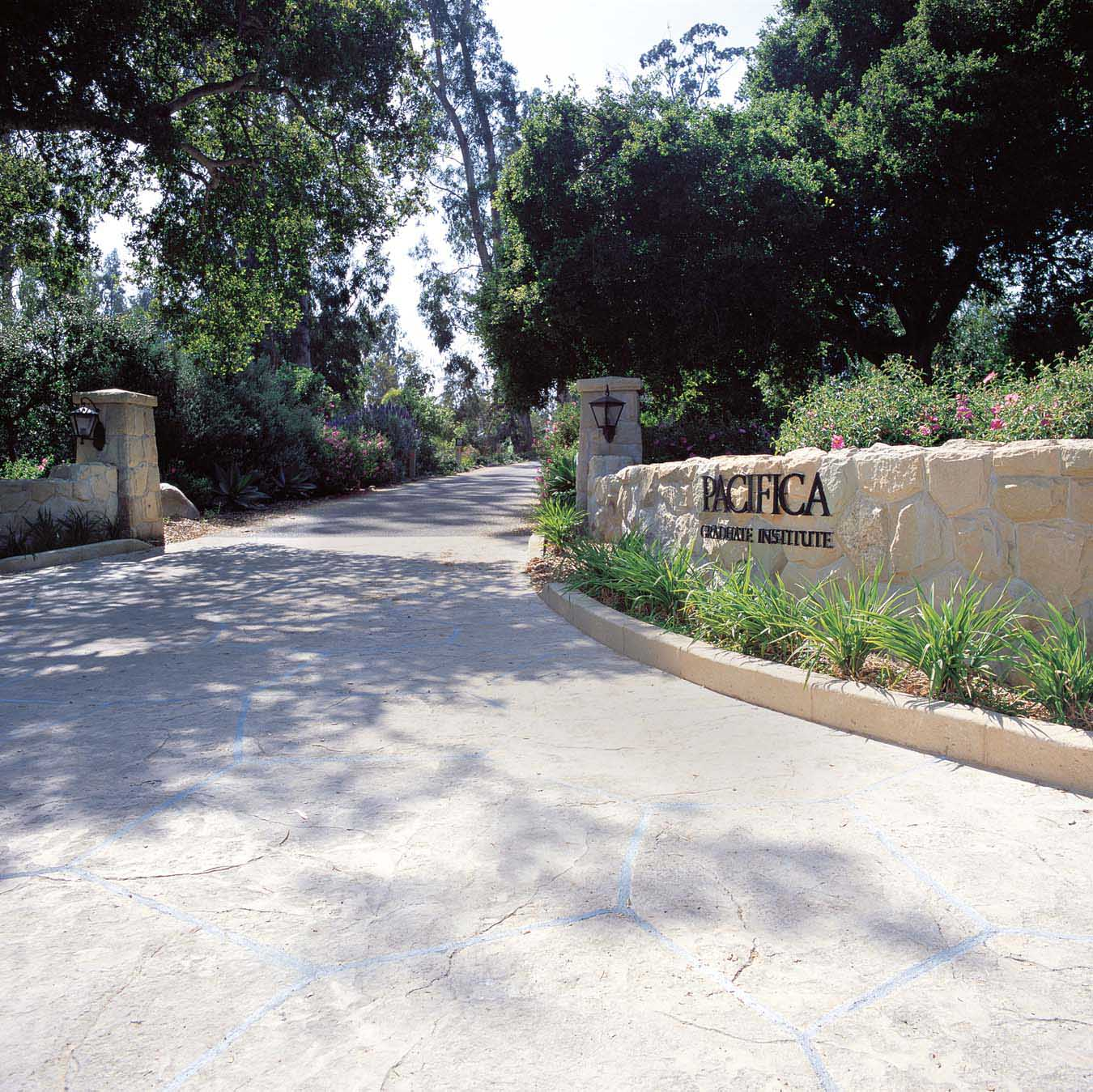
Entrance to Lambert Road Campus

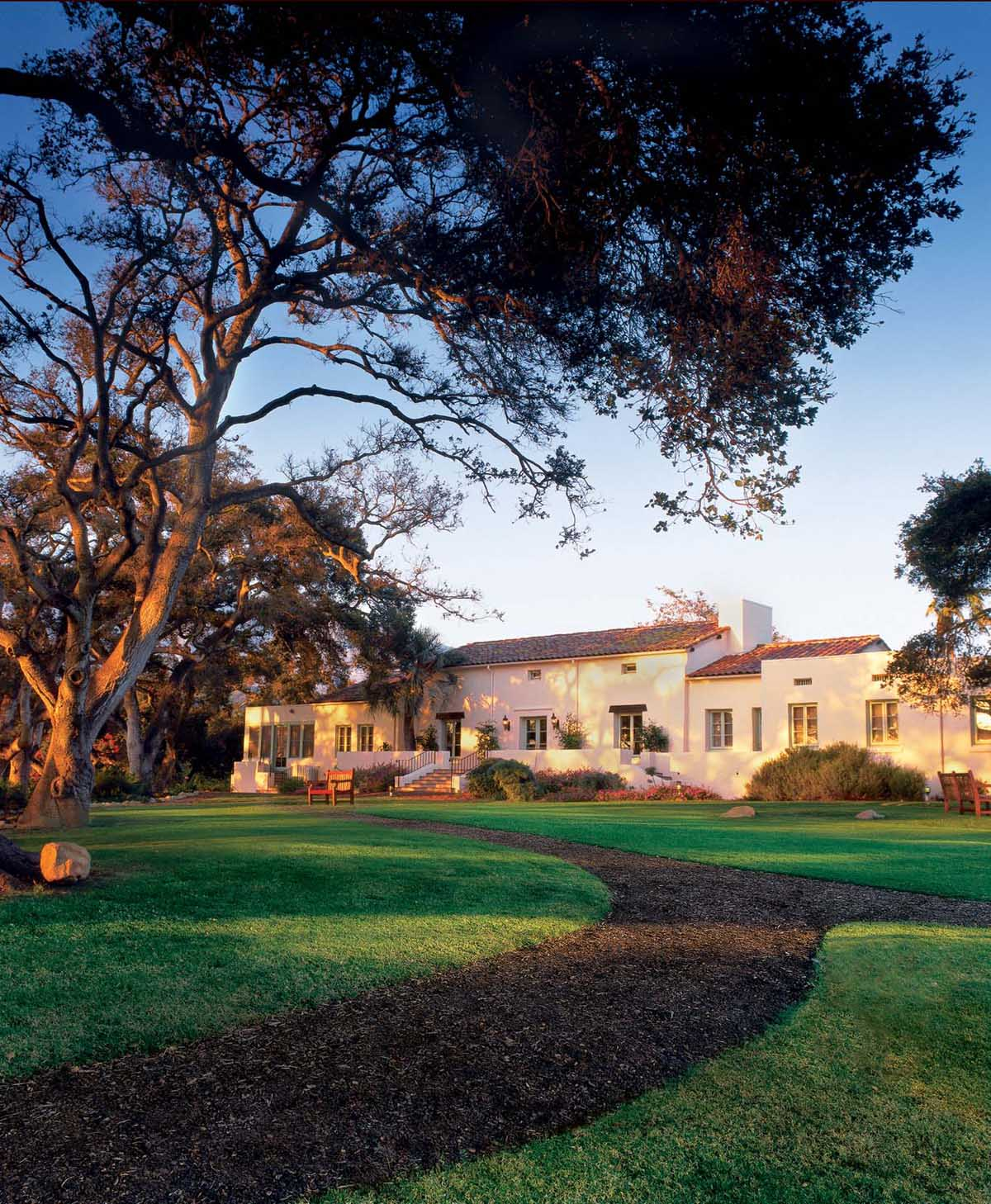
Lambert Road Campus

== History ==
It origin as an educational institution dates to the 1976 inauguration of a nine-month para-professional Counseling Skills Certificate program offered by the Human Relations Center. The institute's original name was the Human Relations Institute.

The M.A. in Counseling Psychology was initiated in 1982. In 1984 the institute announced a new M.A. Counseling Psychology program with an emphasis in depth psychology. The program was launched in 1984 by Stan Passy, who drew on his doctoral work in archetypal psychology with James Hillman at the University of Dallas. Faculty and visiting lecturers have included Marion Woodman, Thomas Moore, Robert A. Johnson, and Marija Gimbutas.

In 1996, Dr. Stephen Aizenstat was named founding president and Gary Linker was the vice president when the Santa Barbara Graduate School Inc. was formed as a private corporation. The name of the school was changed to the Pacifica Graduate Institute in 1989.

The mythological studies program was created in 1994 by Jonathan Young, building on his work as founding curator of the Joseph Campbell Archives. The program combines folklore, literature, creative studies, and archetypal psychology.

In September 2013 and March 2014, groups of former and current Ph.D. students from the clinical psychology program filed a lawsuit stating that the school misrepresented its APA accreditation status. They alleged negligent and intentional misrepresentation, concealment and unfair business practices, according to the complaint. Pacifica responded that the claims were without merit. Pacifica has never said that its degree programs in clinical psychology are accredited by the APA, an independent regulatory body. While some states and jurisdictions require graduation from an APA accredited school for licensure to practice as a clinical psychologist, California, where Pacifica is located, does not require APA accreditation.

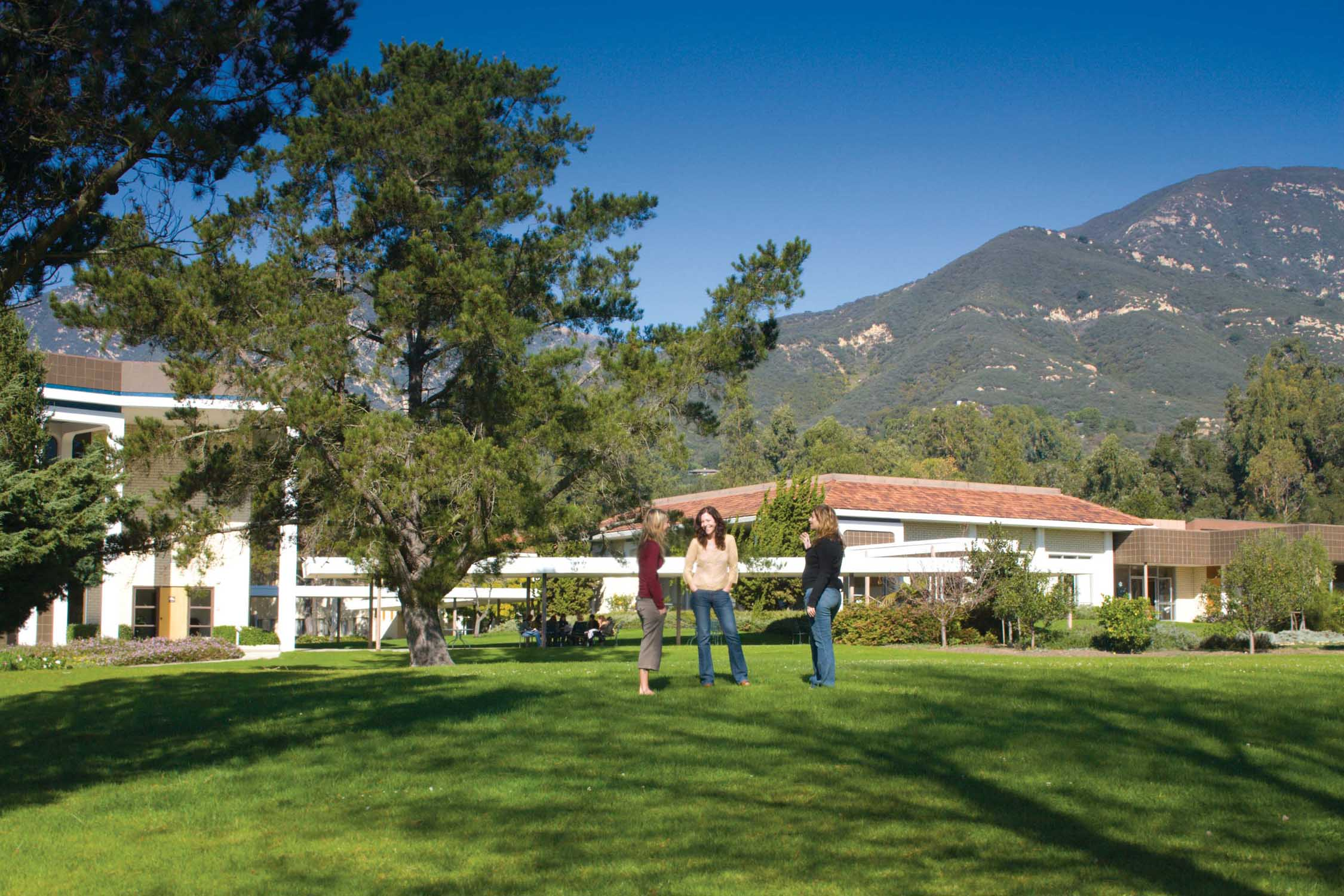
Ladera Lane Campus

The Engaged Humanities & Creative Life program, along with the Jungian & Archetypal Studies specialization of the M.A./Ph.D. program are the two online/hybrid programs Pacifica offers, with the majority of coursework accomplished online by students. The online studies are combined with quarterly four-day visits either on campus or at the New York Open Center. All other degrees are completed in monthly three-day or four-day retreats and one summer week annually.

== Academics ==
The institute offers Masters of Arts, Psy.D., and Ph.D. degrees. Pacifica's academic programs are all subject to review and approval on multiple levels by the Western Association of Schools and Colleges (WASC) Senior College and University Commission (WSCUC), the State of California Board of Private Postsecondary Education (BPPE), and U. S. Department of Education (DOE). Pacifica's M.A. in Counseling Psychology program provides its mission statements, program goals, student learning outcomes, and time to completion rates. The Ph.D. in Clinical Psychology program provides its mission statements, program goals, student learning outcomes, and time to completion rates as well. Pacifica's Clinical Psychology programs, along with all other Pacifica degree programs, are accredited by WASC.

The California Board of Behavioral Sciences reports that 85% of the Pacifica graduates taking the MFT standard written exam from 1/1/2015-6/30/2015 passed the exam, which ranks higher than the state average of 65% for that time period. Clinical psychology graduates had a 100% pass rate on the California Psychology Supplemental Examination (CPSE) exam from 1/1/14 to 12/31/14 and had an 85% pass rate on the Examination for Professional Practice of Psychology (EPPP) from 1/1/14 to 12/31/14.

== Pacifica Extension ==
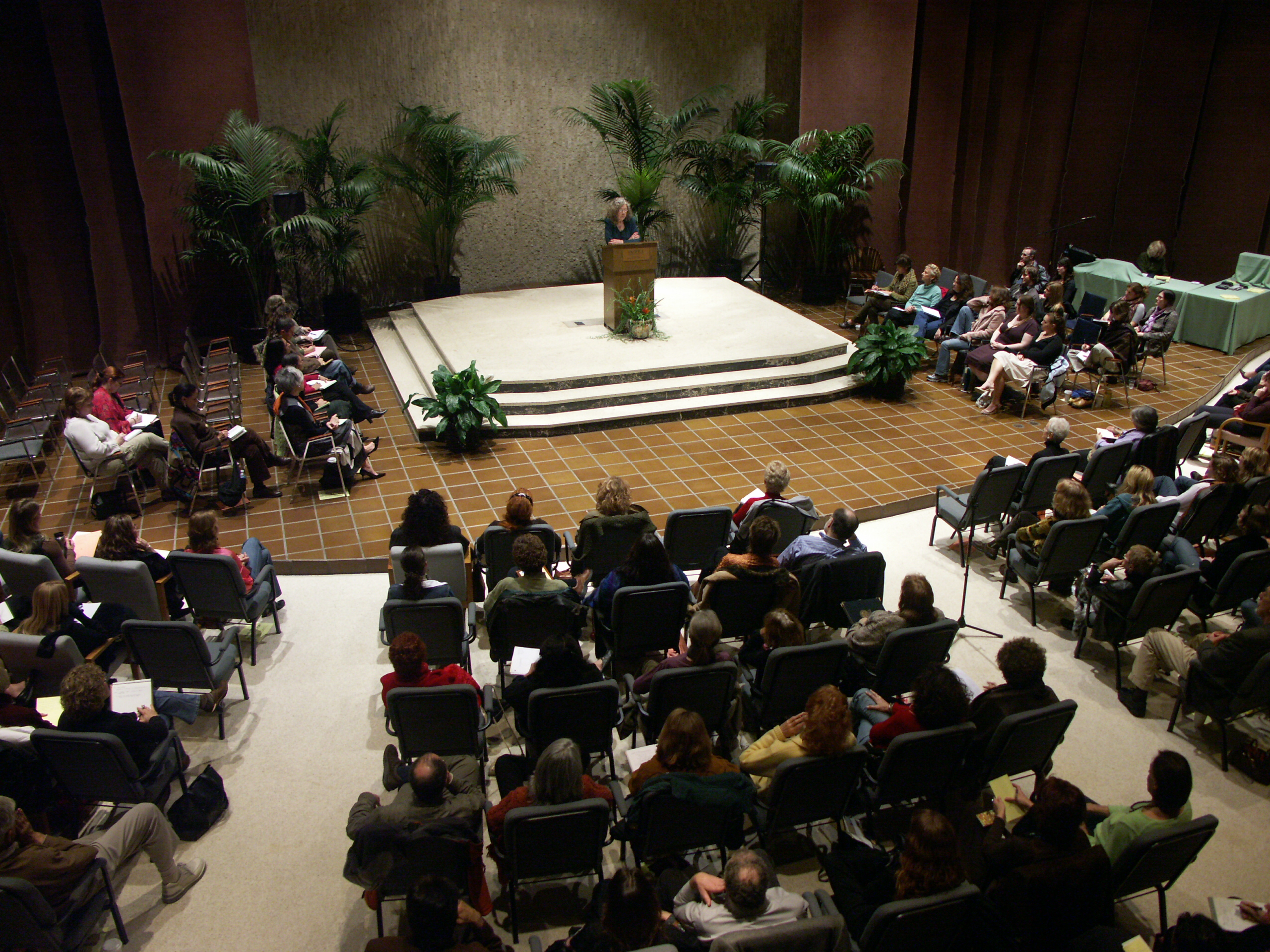
Public program at Pacifica led by Marion Woodman

Pacifica Extension offers educational programs that emphasize the application of depth psychology to current real-world issues. Through online and on-campus formats, the program encourages collaborative learning communities that bring together imagination, scientific inquiry, and reflective exploration in an interdisciplinary academic setting. These events are open to the general public with the intention of bringing Pacifica's educational resources to the wider community. Past presenters include Joseph Campbell, Jean Houston, Michael J. Meade, Huston Smith, Malidoma Patrice Somé, Sonu Shamdasani, Thomas Moore, Marion Woodman, James Hillman, and Robert Bly.

== Campuses ==
Pacifica's two campus locations are within three miles of each other in the foothills of the Santa Barbara suburbs. The 13 acre Lambert Road Campus is the former Max Fleishman estate. The Ladera Lane campus is 35 acres (14 ha) with views of the Pacific Ocean and Channel Islands. Each campus contains multiple gardens, while the Lambert Campus hosts the larger Organic Garden. The Organic Garden, consisting of 7 acres (2.8 ha), is farmed year round, producing vegetables and fruits available to the community.

=== Graduate Research Library ===
Pacifica Graduate Institute's library resources and services support graduate-level study in the areas of counseling psychology, clinical psychology, depth psychology, depth psychotherapy, mythological studies, and humanities. Subject area strengths are in Jungian and archetypal psychology, depth psychology, psychoanalysis, clinical psychology, mythology, religious studies, psychological studies of literature, and research methodology. The Graduate Research Libraries on the Lambert and Ladera campuses contain over 26,000 books, provide access to over 300,000 ebooks, 4,000 theses and dissertations, and 2,000 audio and video materials. They also provide access to thousands of journals, both in print and electronic formats. The collection includes faculty publications, rare and hard-to-find books, and reference materials such as specialized encyclopedias and handbooks. The library also maintains an archive of open access digitized audio faculty lectures on various topics from prior years, stored in the Internet Archive. Lectures can be downloaded in different file formats or listened to online.

=== Bookstore ===
The institute's bookstore stocks over 5,000 book titles focused on Depth psychology, Archetypal psychology, the humanities, and mythology. The bookstore is located on Pacifica Graduate Institute's Ladera Lane campus in Montecito.

== Official Pacifica Alumni Connections ==
Pacifica Graduate Institute established the Official Pacifica Alumni Connections (OPAC) as an initiative intended to support ongoing engagement with its alumni community. The program reflects the institute’s long-standing practice of maintaining relationships with graduates and providing opportunities for continued connection, collaboration, and professional development.

Pacifica alumni work in fields related to depth psychology, the humanities, education, and therapeutic practice. Through Pacifica Alumni Connections, the institute facilitates communication and engagement between alumni and the broader Pacifica community, with the aim of supporting alumni activities while reinforcing the institute’s educational mission.

=== Notable alumni ===
- Nadine Macaluso, psychologist and former model.

== OPUS Archives ==
A not-for-profit organization with facilities on both Pacifica campuses, Opus Archives and Research Center works to preserve, develop, and extend the archival collections and libraries of eminent scholars in the fields of depth psychology, mythology, and the humanities. Opus makes these collections available to researchers, scholars, students, and the general public for research. To fulfill its mission of functioning as a living archive, Opus also offers scholarships, research grants, educational programs, and community events.

=== Joseph Campbell Collection at OPUS ===
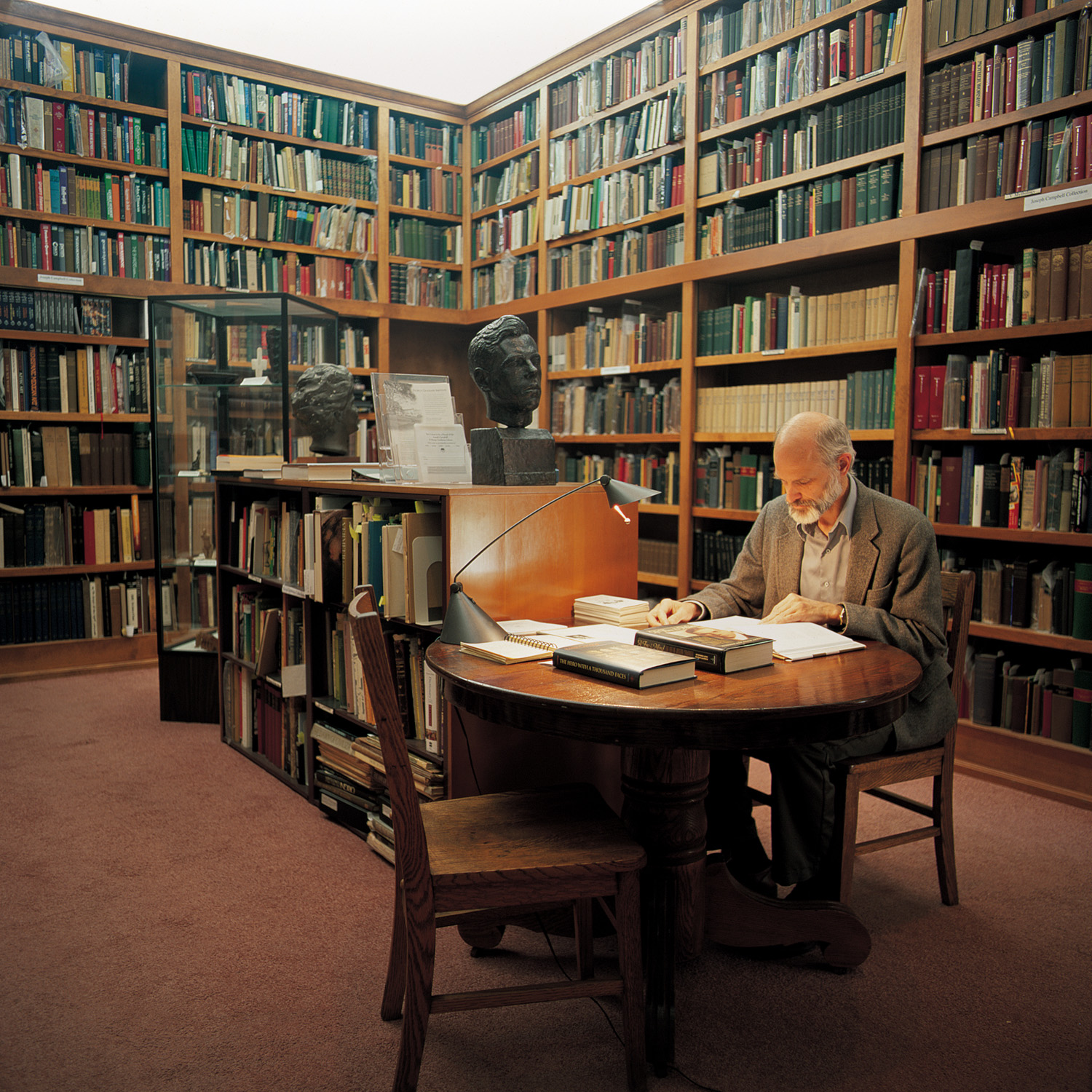
Joseph Campbell Library on Lambert Campus

Joseph Campbell's papers and collections were entrusted to the OPUS Archives and Research Center on the campuses of Pacifica Graduate Institute. Campbell's papers have since been moved to The New York Public Library. The renowned author, scholar, and mythologist was a long-time friend of Pacifica and a frequent guest lecturer. After Campbell's death, Jean Erdman Campbell and the Joseph Campbell Foundation donated his papers, books and other effects to the Center for the Study of Depth Psychology at Pacifica. The center became OPUS Archives and Research Center and is the home of Campbell's library. The founding curator, Jonathan Young, worked closely with Jean Erdman Campbell to gather the materials from Campbell's homes in Honolulu and Greenwich Village, New York City. Campbell's library features approximately 3,000 volumes and covers a broad range of subjects including anthropology, folklore, religion, literature, and psychology. Campbell's papers, now housed at The New York Public Library, include lectures, original manuscripts, and research papers. The mission of Opus Archives and the Research Center is to preserve, develop, and extend to the world the archival collections and libraries of eminent scholars in the fields of depth psychology, mythology and the humanities. The center is a living archive, supporting interdisciplinary dialogue, education, grants, research opportunities and public programs.

=== Marija Gimbutas Collection at OPUS ===
OPUS holds over 15,000 slides utilized by Marija Gimbutas in her lectures and books on Neolithic civilizations and the goddess, thousands of research catalogue cards in numerous languages handwritten by Gimbutas, and extensive texts on the subjects of history, archaeology, and the humanities.

=== James Hillman Collection at OPUS ===
James Hillman's collection includes first draft manuscripts of his books, including Re-Visioning Psychology, which earned him a nomination for the Pulitzer Prize. Hillman's prolific career is documented through correspondence, personal notes, and unfinished projects that are available for pursuit by scholars of the next generation.

=== Marion Woodman Collection at OPUS ===
Marion Woodman's collection includes manuscripts, lectures, and correspondence. Throughout her career Woodman focused on the relationship of psyche and soma and this specialization, particularly as it manifested in the experiences and lives of women, was groundbreaking in the field of Jungian studies.

== Faculty ==
Pacifica's PlumX installation provides a story of Pacifica's faculty scholarship and publication impact, by means of altmetrics. Profiles for core, distinguished, and visiting faculty provide cumulative insights into how faculty research is interacted with, shared, commented on, purchased, and disseminated in both print and electronic format. PlumX gathers and brings together metrics for all types of scholarly research output, including published books, journal articles, conference papers, videos, data sets, interviews, and other online web resources. Pacifica's PlumX installation categorizes Pacifica metrics into 5 separate types: usage (e.g. downloads and library holdings), captures (e.g. bookmarks, favorites, readers, watchers), mentions (e.g. blog posts, comments, reviews), social media (e.g. likes, shares, tweets), and citations (how many times research has been cited).
