= Inner Healing Movement =

Christian grassroots counseling

The Inner Healing Movement refers to a grassroots lay counseling movement among Christians of various denominations.

== History ==
Agnes Sanford (1897–1982) is considered to be the mother of the inner healing movement. Along with her husband, she founded The Agnes Sanford School of Pastoral Care in 1958.

The inner healing movement is also often compared and associated with Inner Healing and Healing of Memories. Other people who feature prominently in its history are Ruth Carter Stapleton, Francis MacNutt, Betty and Ed Tapscott, Leanne Payne, and Charles Fillmore.

== Concerns about memory work ==
Theophostic Prayer Ministry (TPM) techniques and other inner healing models that incorporate memory work have become popular. However, some have concerns about these approaches with some of their underlying principles being compared with those of recovered-memory therapy (RMT). In the Journal of Psychology and Theology, Spring 2004, Christian psychologist David Entwistle summarized some concerns associated with Theophostic methods: 'TPM follows in the lineage of "healing of memory" techniques, though it departs from that lineage in a number of important respects. Numerous concerns exist surrounding insufficient attempts to ground TPM in biblical concepts; inadequate and often flawed explanations of basic psychological processes; dubious claims about the prevalence of [dissociative identity disorder, Satanic ritual abuse], and demonic activity; estimates of traumatic abuse that exceed empirical findings; and the failure to sufficiently appreciate the possibility of iatrogenic memory contamination.'

TPM and others, such as De Silva and Liebscher of Sozo ministry, denounce the use of memory recovery as described in the above concerns.

== Books ==
- Fillmore, Charles (1936). Prosperity. Unity Village, MO: Unity Books. ISBN 1-58509-294-0.
- Sanford, Agnes (1947). The Healing Light. St. Paul: MacAlester Park Publishing Company. ISBN 978-0-910924-36-8.
- Sanford, Agnes (1969). The Healing Power of the Bible. Hodder & Stoughton. ISBN 0-340-18217-2.
- Carter Stapleton, Ruth (1976). The Gift of Inner Healing. Word Books. ISBN 0-553-12047-6.
- Carter Stapleton, Ruth (1979). The Experience of Inner Healing. Bantam Books. ISBN 0-553-12047-6.
- Payne, Leanne (1991). The Healing Presence. Baker Books. ISBN 0-80105348-X.
- Smith, Edward (2004). Healing Life's Hurts Through Theophostic Prayer: Let The Light Of Christ Set You Free From Lifelong Fears, Shame, False Guilt, Anxiety And Emotional Pain. Regal Books. ISBN 0-83073669-7.
- Rustenbach, Rusty (2011). A Guide for Listening and Inner-Healing Prayer: Meeting God in the Broken Places. Nav Press. ISBN 978-1-61747086-8.
- Smith, Sherrie Rice (2015). EFT for Christians. Energy Psychology Press. ISBN 978-1-60415-251-7.
- Lehman, K. (2016). The Immanuel Approach: for Emotional healing and for life. Evanston IL: Immanuel Publishing.
- King, J. D. (2017). Regeneration: A Complete History of Healing in the Christian Church. Vol. 2. Christos Publishing. ISBN 0-999-28261-1.

== See also ==
- Ellel Ministries International
