= Francis MacNutt =

American priest (1925–2020)

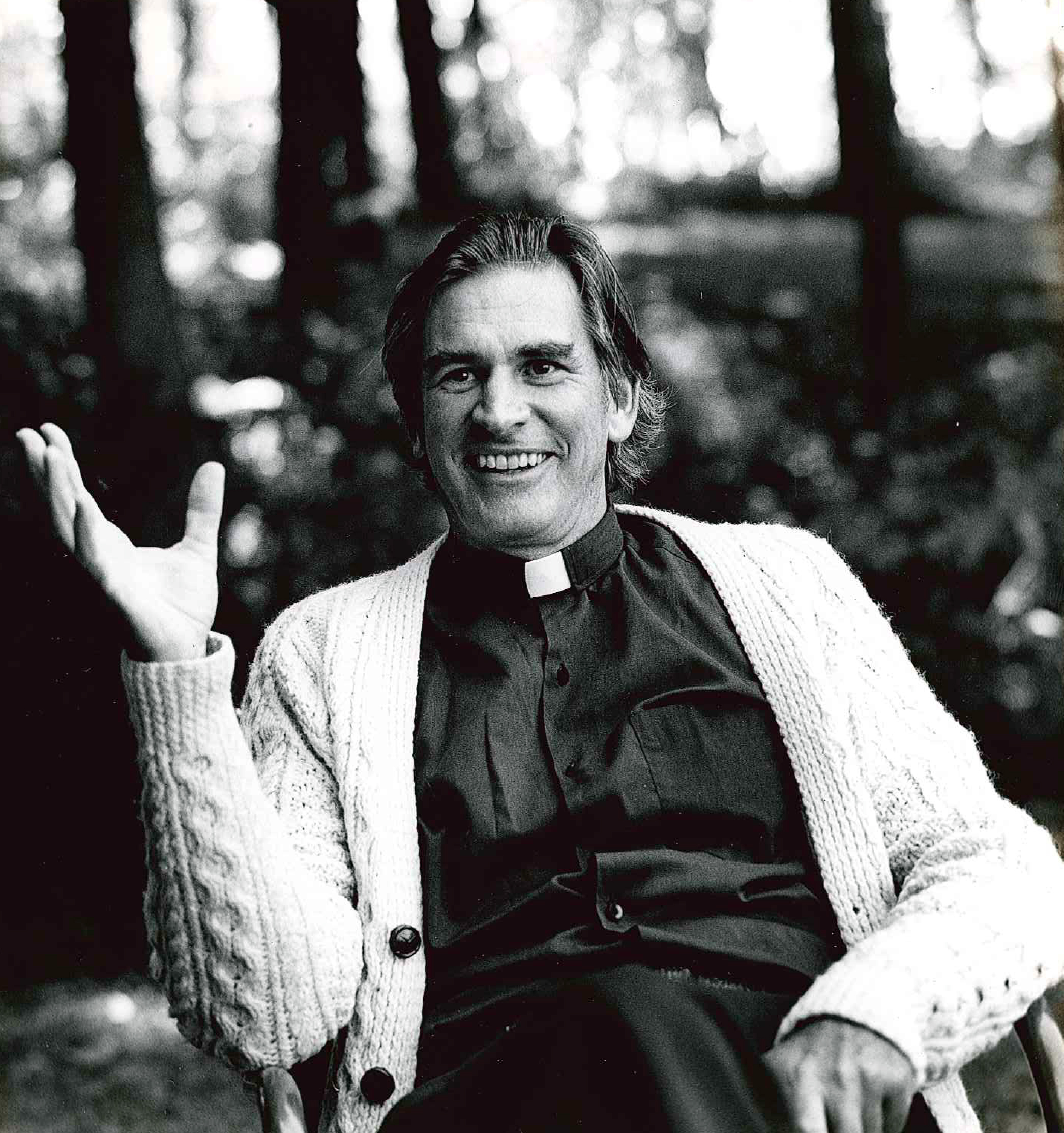
- Francis MacNutt, former Dominican Catholic priest
- Born: Francis Scott MacNutt; April 22, 1925; St. Louis, Missouri, U.S.
- Died: January 12, 2020 (aged 94); Jacksonville, Florida, U.S.
- Education: B.A., Harvard University; M.A. in speech and drama, The Catholic University of America, Washington; Ph.D. in Theology, Aquinas Institute of Theology
- Occupation: Faith healer
- Known for: Catholic Charismatic Renewal
- Spouse: Judith Carole Sewell
- Children: 2

Ecclesiastical career
- Religion: Christianity
- Church: Catholic Church
- Ordained: 1956
- Laicized: 1993
- Offices held: Surgical technician, United States Army; Roman Catholic priest, Merton House, St. Louis, Missouri; Founder of the Association of Christian Therapists; Co-founder of Christian Healing Ministries, Jacksonville, Florida
- Website: www.christianhealingmin.org

Francis Scott MacNutt (April 22, 1925 – January 12, 2020) was an American former Roman Catholic priest. Associated with the Catholic Charismatic Renewal he was an author of books on healing prayer, including Healing, The Healing Reawakening and Deliverance from Evil Spirits.

== Biography ==
MacNutt grew up in St. Louis, Missouri. He earned a B.A. degree from Harvard University in 1948, and a M.A. degree in speech and drama from The Catholic University of America, Washington. In 1950, MacNutt joined the Dominican Order and was ordained to the priesthood in 1956. He gained a Ph.D. degree in theology. He taught at a seminary in Dubuque, Iowa, for several years before moving back to St Louis in 1966 to become executive director of the National Catholic Preaching Conference.

MacNutt learned of the charismatic movement through Pentecostal Protestant friends. As a young Roman Catholic priest, he was prominent and influential in the charismatic renewal in the 1960s, and during the 1970s he became associated with the practices of speaking in tongues and faith healing and appeared on television with Ruth Carter Stapleton, the sister of President Carter. In the late 1970s he was director of the Thomas Merton Foundation in St. Louis.

He left the Dominican Order to marry Judith Carole Sewell, a psychotherapist whose practice integrated healing prayer, in February 1980 and they settled in Clearwater, Florida, where they established Christian Healing Ministries that same year.

From the beginning of their marriage, the MacNutts traveled widely, speaking and ministering together. In 1987, at the invitation of the Episcopal Diocese of Florida, they moved to Jacksonville, Florida, and expanded Christian Healing Ministries into a healing center for prayer ministry and teaching.

In 1993, MacNutt received a dispensation from Church authorities, and their marriage was celebrated with a ceremony officiated by the Most Reverend John Snyder, Bishop of the Diocese of St. Augustine, at Marywood Retreat Center in Jacksonville. MacNutt and his wife have two grown children, Rachel and David.

In 2007, the International Catholic Charismatic Renewal Service in the Vatican co-sponsored an international conference with Christian Healing Ministries (CHM) for 450 Catholic leaders from 42 countries. This conference was held in Jacksonville, with the purpose of bringing the MacNutts' teachings to the worldwide Church.

In 1974, he wrote Healing, which has become a classic. His other books include: Power to Heal, The Prayer That Heals, Overcome by the Spirit, Deliverance from Evil Spirits, Homosexuality: Can It Be Healed? and The Healing Reawakening. He and Judith also co-authored Praying for Your Unborn Child.

In 2008, MacNutt named his wife, Judith, to succeed him as President of CHM, while he took on the position of President Emeritus.

Francis MacNutt died on January 12, 2020, aged 94.
