= Fritz Künkel =

Fritz Künkel (September 6, 1889 – April 1, 1956) was known both as a German psychiatrist and an American psychologist. He might best be understood as a social scientist who sought to integrate psychology (especially the work of Freud, Adler and Jung), sociology and religion into a unified theory of human being. He consolidated these insights into a theory of character development and finally into his "We-Psychology".

== Biography ==
The following material comes from the brief life written by John A. Sanford, with the assistance of Kunkel's two sons.

Kunkel was born the seventh of eight siblings, on a wealthy estate in Brandenburg (now Poland), on September 6, 1889. His early life was characterized as carefree, imaginative, active and social. While pursuing a variety of interests, he did manage to study medicine, receiving his medical degree “a few days after the beginning of the First World War”.At the Battle of Verdun, working as a battalion surgeon, he received a shrapnel wound that led to the loss of his left arm.

Around 1919-1920, Kunkel moved to Vienna, where he became associated with Alfred Adler. In 1924, he began to practice Adlerian psychotherapy in Berlin. Over the next 10 to 15 years he built on his Adlerian foundations, publishing a dozen books and founding his unique school of "We-Psychology".

In 1920 he married Ruth Löwengard, who became his colleague and co-founder of the Adler Institute in Berlin. They had three children. After the death of Ruth in January 1932, he married Elizabeth Jensen, and they had two more children.

When Hitler came to power, Kunkel became increasingly disturbed by the restrictions being placed on psychotherapy, and he planned to immigrate to the USA with his family. He accepted an invitation by the Quakers to give a lecture tour in the United States in 1936, and again in 1939. When the war broke out in September 1939, he could not come back to Germany to pick up his family.

His eldest son came to the States in 1938, after having attended the Quaker school in Eerde, in the Netherlands, and his two siblings, also Eerde students, followed after the war. Elizabeth and her two boys joined her husband in December 1947. Kunkel continued to develop We-Psychology and his religious psychology, while leading an active life of writing, lecturing, and psychotherapy, until his death on Easter Sunday in 1956.

== Literary works ==
- Das Dumme Kind (The Stupid Child). In Schwer erziehbare Kinder : eine Schriftenfolge. Dresden, 1926.
- Die Grundbegriffe der Individualpsychologie (The Fundamental Concepts of Individual Psychology), with Ruth Kunkel. Berlin, 1927.
- Die Arbeit am Character (Working on the Character). Schwerin, 1929. English translation, God Helps Those..., New York, 1931.
- Angewandte Charakterkunde (Applied Characterology). Leipzig, 1929-1935.
  - Part 1: Einführung in die Characterkunde (Introduction to Characterology). 1929. English translation, Let's Be Normal!, New York, 1929.
  - Part 2: Charakter, Wachstum und Erziehung (Character, Growth, and Education). 1931. English translation Philadelphia, 1938.
  - Part 3: Charakter, Liebe und Ehe (Character, Love, and Marriage). 1932.
  - Part 4: Charakter, Einzelmensch und Gruppe (Character, the Individual, and the Group). 1933.
  - Part 5: Charakter, Leiden und Heilung (Character, Suffering, and Healing). 1935.
  - Part 6: Charakter, Krisis und Weltanschauung (Character, Crisis, and Worldview). 1935. A revision of Vitale Dialektik.
- Der kritische Punkt in der Charakterkunde (The Critical Point in the Study of Character). In Arzt und Seelsorger volume 18. Schwerin, 1929.
- Vitale Dialektik (Vital Dialectics). Leipzig, 1929.
- Jugendcharakterkunde (The Study of Adolescent Character). Schwerin, 1930. English translation, What It Means To Grow Up, New York, 1936.
- Grundzüge der Politischen Charakterkunde (Fundamentals of Political Characterology). Berlin, 1931.
- Eine Angstneurose und Ihre Behandlung (An Anxiety Neurosis and Its Treatment). Leipzig, 1931.
- Krisenbriefe (Crisis Letters). Schwerin, 1932.
- De religieuze opvoeding in het gezin en het ongeloof (Religious Upbringing in the Family and Disbelief). Volume two of Psychologie van het ongeloof. Amsterdam, 1933.
- Grundzüge der praktischen Seelenheilkunde (Fundamentals of Practical Psychotherapy). Stuttgart and Leipzig, 1935.
- Conquer Yourself. New York, 1936.
- Die Erziehung Deiner Kinder (Raising Your Children), with Elizabeth Kunkel. Berlin, 1936.
- Das Wir (The "We"). Schwerin, 1939.
- How Character Develops, with Roy Dickerson. New York, 1940.
- In Search of Maturity. New York, 1943. German edition, Ringen um Reife (Striving for Maturity), Konstanz, 1955.
- What Do You Advise?, with Ruth Gardner. New York, 1946.
- Creation Continues. New York, 1947. German translation, Die Schöpfung geht weiter, Konstanz, 1957.
- My Dear Ego. Boston, 1947.

== See also ==
- Collective identity
