= Global Church Network =

American Christian organization

- Company type: Corporation
- Genre: Evangelical Christian
- Founded: 2002
- Founder: Bill Bright; James O. Davis
- Headquarters: Melbourne, Florida, United States
- Area served: International
- Products: various media
- Services: education, networking and strategic planning
- Website: gcnw.tv

Global Church Network is an American incorporated educational, networking and strategic resource for evangelical leadership. The headquarters is in Melbourne, Florida.

== History ==
Global Church Network was founded in 2002 by Bill Bright, the late founder and chairman of Campus Crusade for Christ, and James O. Davis, founder of Cutting Edge International. Over the next decade It hopes to help five million churches to be planted and, in their own words, "win 1 billion people to Christ worldwide". It is based in Orlando, Florida, and boasts 800,000 members worldwide.

In 2003, it had 800,000 members, and Billion Soul Network formed in 2007, with a membership of 475,000 churches worldwide.

Former New York City Mayor Rudy Giuliani has been a conference speaker and proponent of the movement.

Driving forces propelling the movement forward include conferences, books and significant prayer initiatives.

Over two hundred church denominations now participate in the movement.

=== Key people ===
- James O. Davis, president

=== Billion Soul Pastors Conference ===
On January 31, 2006, GPN made mention in Time when it met with presidential hopeful Rudy Giuliani at the Global Pastors Network Billion Soul Pastors Conference. A surprise guest, he said he depended on his faith in God and people in the September 11 events. "Strong beliefs guide countries – and churches", he said. "I know many of the men who died on 9/11 came from religious homes where they were taught there is no greater principle than to lay down your life for another," Giuliani later added. Held on January 25–27 at Faith Assembly Church in Orlando, over 2,000 pastors and business leaders were in attendance. Bill Bright's widow Vonnette also spoke. Represented among the business sector speakers were Al Weiss, president of worldwide operations for Disney, and S. Truett Cathy, founder of Chick-fil-A. The network made plans to organize a Billion Soul Sunday, a day of worldwide prayer for a billion souls to be saved.

=== Billion Soul Sunday ===
On September 17, 2006, the Billion Soul Sunday event was simulcast via the web.

=== Soul Millionaires ===
'Soul Millionaires' was scheduled for January 29–31, 2008, also in Orlando.

== See also ==
- Campus Crusade for Christ
- Million Man March
- Promise Keepers
