= Paul Henderson =

Canadian ice hockey player (born 1943)

CM OOnt Paul Henderson
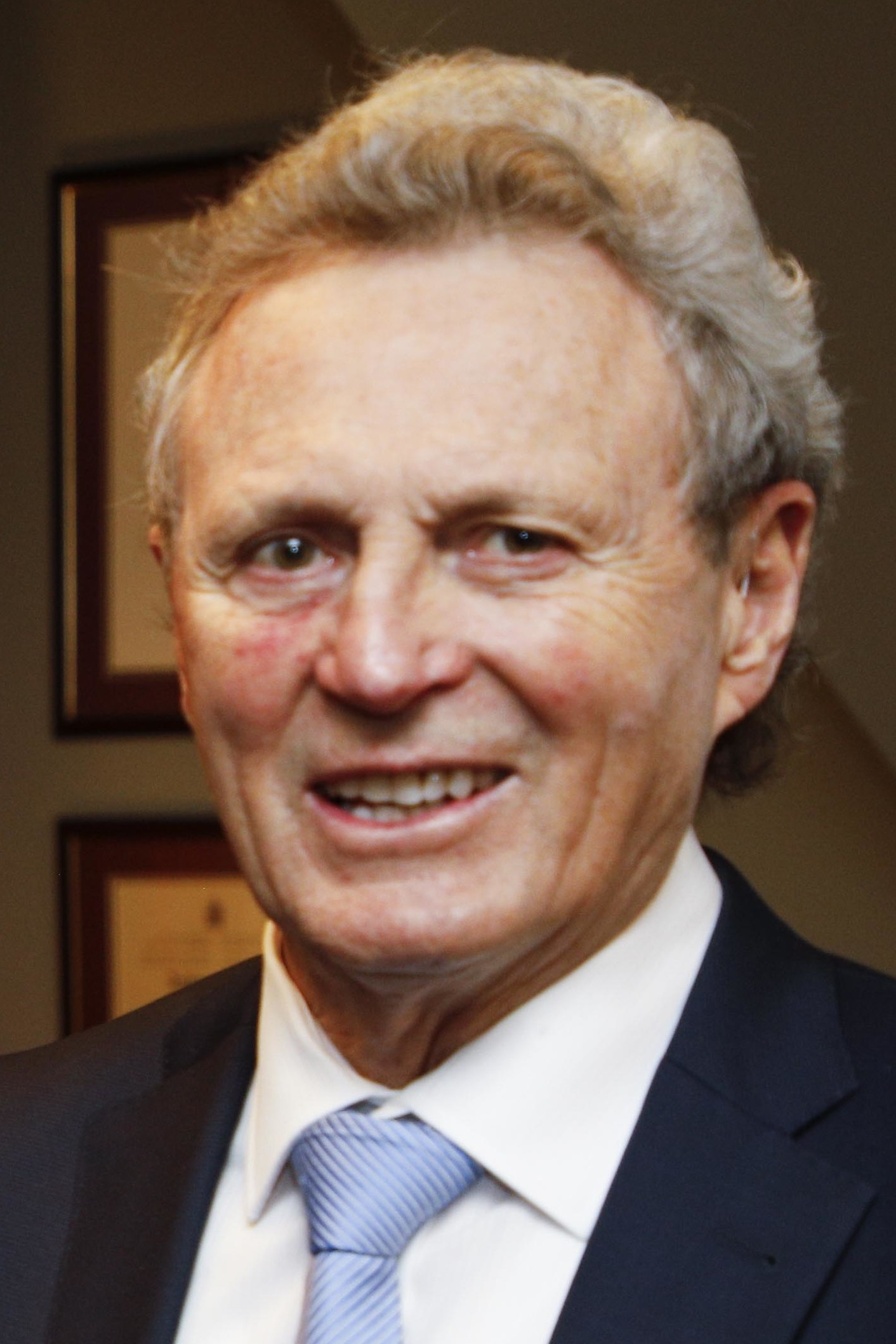
- Henderson in 2019
- Born: January 28, 1943 (age 83) Kincardine, Ontario, Canada
- Height: 5 ft 10 in (178 cm)
- Weight: 180 lb (82 kg; 12 st 12 lb)
- Position: Left wing
- Shot: Right
- Played for: Detroit Red Wings; Toronto Maple Leafs; Toronto Toros; Birmingham Bulls; Atlanta Flames
- National team: Canada
- Playing career: 1962–1981

Paul Garnet Henderson (born January 28, 1943) is a Canadian former professional ice hockey player. A left winger, Henderson played 13 seasons in the National Hockey League (NHL) for the Detroit Red Wings, Toronto Maple Leafs and Atlanta Flames and five in the World Hockey Association (WHA) for the Toronto Toros and Birmingham Bulls. He played over 1,000 games between the two major leagues, scoring 376 goals and 758 points. Henderson played in two NHL All-Star Games and was a member of the 1962 Memorial Cup-winning Hamilton Red Wings team as a junior.

Henderson is best known for playing for Team Canada in the 1972 Summit Series against the Soviet Union. The series was viewed as a Cold War battle for both hockey and cultural supremacy. Henderson scored the game-winning goal in each of the final three games, the last of which has become legendary in Canada and made him a national hero: it was voted the "sports moment of the century" by The Canadian Press and earned him numerous accolades. Those three wins secured the series for the Canadians by the narrowest of margins. Henderson has twice been inducted into Canada's Sports Hall of Fame: in 1995 individually and in 2005 along with all players of the Summit Series team. He was inducted into the International Ice Hockey Federation Hall of Fame in 2013.

A born-again Christian, Henderson became a minister, motivational speaker and author following his playing career. He has co-written three books related to hockey or his life. Henderson was made a Member of the Order of Canada in 2013 and of the Order of Ontario in 2014.

== Early life ==
Henderson was born January 28, 1943, near Kincardine, Ontario. His mother, Evelyn, went into labour while staying at his father's parents' farm in the nearby community of Amberley during a snowstorm. She gave birth to Paul while the family was crossing Lake Huron via horse-drawn sleigh attempting to reach the hospital in Kincardine. His father, Garnet, was fighting for Canada during the Second World War at the time and did not meet his son until Paul was nearly three years old. Garnet worked for the Canadian National Railway following his return and the family – Paul was the eldest to brother Bruce and sisters Marilyn, Coralyn and Sandra – moved frequently to different posts in Ontario before settling in Lucknow.

The family often struggled financially, though Garnet was always able to provide the basic life necessities. Paul's first experiences with hockey came at a young age in the basement of a local restaurant serving western fare operated by Charlie Chin, an immigrant from China who settled in Lucknow. Henderson played with Chin's youngest sons using a ball instead of a puck. The Chin family gave Henderson his first set of hockey equipment; he had been using old catalogues as shin pads. His father coached his youth teams, and at one minor hockey tournament, told his teammates simply to "just give the puck to Paul and get out of his way". That incident remained with Henderson throughout his life: while it embarrassed him at the time to be singled out in front of his friends and teammates, he later realized it stood as an affirmation and expression of his father's pride in him and his abilities.

It was in Lucknow where Henderson met his future wife, Eleanor, at the age of 15 while he was working at a grocery store. They married in 1962 and, wanting to ensure he could provide for his wife, he considered giving up the game to become a history and physical education teacher. His father convinced him to remain in hockey, warning him that he would regret it for the rest of his life if he never tried to make the National Hockey League (NHL). After considering his father's advice and talking with Eleanor, Henderson decided to play two additional years, and if he had not reached the NHL by 1964, he would quit the game and focus on his education.

== Playing career ==
=== Junior ===
Henderson attracted the attention of NHL scouts at the age of 15 when he scored 18 goals and 2 assists in a 21–6 victory in a juvenile playoff game. The junior affiliates of both the Boston Bruins and Detroit Red Wings offered him tryouts. He chose to sign with the Red Wings as their junior teams were based in Hamilton, which was closest to his home. He played the 1959–60 season with the Junior B Goderich Sailors and was the youngest player on the team. Henderson moved up to the Junior A Hamilton Red Wings in 1960–61 where he was an extra forward for much of the season. Returning to Hamilton in 1961–62, he became a regular player on the team, and recorded 24 goals and 43 points in 50 games.

Hamilton won the Ontario championship that season, then defeated the Quebec Citadelles in four consecutive games to win the eastern Canadian championship. Henderson scored a goal in the clinching game, a 9–3 win, that propelled the Red Wings to their first Memorial Cup final in the team's history. They faced the Edmonton Oil Kings in the 1962 Memorial Cup final series. The Red Wings won the best-of-seven set 4–1 to capture the national championship. Henderson scored a goal in the deciding game, a 7–4 victory before over 7,000 fans at Kitchener, Ontario. He finished with seven goals and seven assists in 14 Memorial Cup playoff games.

Returning for a third season with Hamilton in 1962–63, Henderson led the Ontario Hockey Association in scoring with 49 goals in 48 games. He added 27 assists to finish the season with 76 points. A bout of strep throat resulted in his missing Hamilton's playoff games, but he was called up to the Detroit Red Wings late in their season when they were short of players. Henderson played his first two NHL games against the Toronto Maple Leafs, with only one shift in each game. In his first game, Henderson elbowed Dick Duff in the head, sparking a fight. He spent the rest of the game on the bench after several Toronto players threatened retaliation against him. In his second, he incurred a slashing penalty during his only time on the ice. Henderson estimated that he was on the ice for only 20 seconds over the two games, but drew nine penalties in minutes.

=== Detroit and Toronto ===
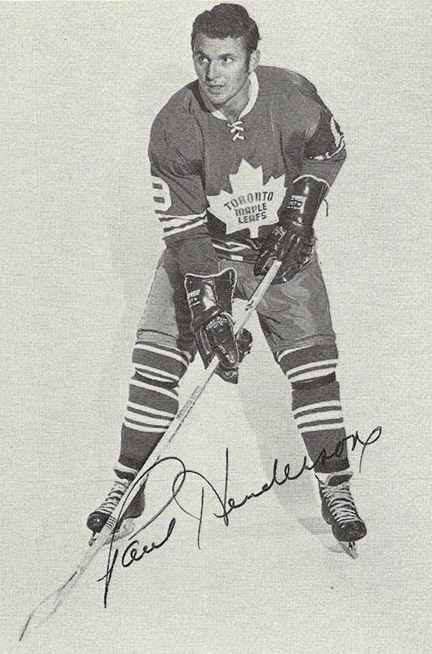
1970 card of Henderson for Toronto Maple Leafs

After failing to make the Detroit roster out of training camp, Henderson was assigned to their American Hockey League (AHL) affiliate, the Pittsburgh Hornets, to begin the 1963–64 season. He appeared in 38 games for the Hornets and his speed and aggressive nature helped him score 10 goals and 24 points. Henderson earned a brief recall to Detroit in November, then joined the NHL team permanently early in the new year. He scored his first NHL goal on January 29, 1964, against the Chicago Black Hawks. It came late in the game against goaltender Glenn Hall and resulted in a 2–2 tie. In 32 regular season NHL games, Henderson recorded three goals and three assists, then appeared in 14 playoff games where he added five more points. The Red Wings reached the 1964 Stanley Cup Finals, but lost in seven games to Toronto.

Henderson established himself as a full-time NHL player in 1964–65, though with limited ice time. He was used primarily in a defensive role and to kill penalties, scoring 8 goals and 21 points, while appearing in 70 games. Switching to the left wing in 1965–66, Henderson played a more offensive role and scored 22 goals. He added three more in 12 playoff games as the Red Wings reached the 1966 Stanley Cup Finals versus the Montreal Canadiens. Henderson scored the game-winning goal in the first game of the finals. After winning the first two games in Montreal, Detroit lost four straight and the series.

Seeking to double his $7,000 salary from the previous season, Henderson became embroiled in a contract dispute with the Red Wings prior to the 1966–67 NHL season, before the team acceded to his demands. He then spent the year attempting to overcome injuries; a case of tracheitis forced him to miss several early season games and led the team to consider having him play wearing a surgical mask to protect against the cold air of the arena. Henderson eventually spent time in the dry air of Arizona to cure the ailment, but he also suffered from torn chest muscles and ultimately missed a third of the season. On the ice, Henderson scored 21 goals and 40 points in 49 games.

The Red Wings were in last place of the NHL's East Division late in the 1967–68 season when, on March 4, 1968, they completed one of the biggest trades in league history up to that time: Henderson was sent to the Toronto Maple Leafs as part of a six-player deal, along with Norm Ullman and Floyd Smith, in exchange for Frank Mahovlich, Garry Unger and Pete Stemkowski. Henderson finished the season with 11 points in 13 games for Toronto, then scored 27 goals and 59 points in 1968–69.

A groin injury plagued Henderson throughout much of the 1969–70 season, but he continued to play at the team's request. He finished with 20 goals despite playing the entire season with pain. The Maple Leafs offered Henderson only a small raise, arguing that he did not deserve more because his offensive production had declined. The contract offer and the team's indifference towards his injury left Henderson disillusioned with management's attitude towards its players. Healthy in 1970–71, he scored 30 goals and an NHL career-high 60 points.

=== Summit Series ===
"It was obviously our way of life against their way of life. They had no scruples whatsoever, as far as we were concerned. ... It really was a whole ideology. It was freedom against communism."

— Paul Henderson recalls the atmosphere of the series during 30th anniversary celebrations.

Canada had long been at a disadvantage in international ice hockey tournaments as its best players were professionals in the NHL and therefore ineligible to play at the ostensibly amateur World Championship and Olympic Games. The Soviets masked the status of their best players by having them serve in the military or hold other jobs affiliated with the teams, so they retained amateur status, even though playing hockey was their only occupational responsibility. The International Ice Hockey Federation (IIHF) promised to allow Canada to use a limited number of professional players at the 1970 tournament but later reneged, causing the nation to withdraw from all international competition. Officials in Canada and the Soviet Union subsequently negotiated an arrangement that would see the top players of each nation – amateur or professional – play in an eight-game "Summit Series" in September 1972 between the world's two greatest hockey nations. Canadian fans and media approached the series with confidence; many predicted that the Canadian professionals would win all eight games.

Henderson's 38-goal season in 1971–72, a career high, earned him a place on Team Canada's roster. He scored a goal early in the first game, in Montreal, that gave Canada a 2–0 lead. The Soviet team then humbled the Canadians by scoring the next four goals and winning 7–3. A 4–1 Canadian win followed in the second game at Maple Leaf Gardens in Toronto, but the Soviets overcame a 4–2 deficit, the fourth goal scored by Henderson, to tie the third game in Winnipeg. Canada lost the fourth game, 5–3, and were jeered by the fans in Vancouver as they headed to Moscow for the final four games with a 1–2–1 series deficit. Henderson, like most of his teammates, was frustrated by his team's play and the negative reaction they received from the crowd.

In the first game in Moscow, Henderson scored a goal to help Canada establish a 4–1 lead, but also suffered a concussion when he was tripped into the boards and knocked unconscious. He returned to finish the game, but the Soviets came back to win, 5–4, and were one victory shy of winning the series. In game six, Canada overcame what coach Harry Sinden called "the worst officials I have ever seen in my life" to win by a 3–2 score, with Henderson scoring the game-winning goal. The game was also notable for Bobby Clarke using his stick in a two-handed slash that broke Valeri Kharlamov's ankle. Henderson later called the event "the low point of the series" during the 30th anniversary celebration, but apologized for his comments after Clarke took umbrage. Canada drew even in the series at three wins apiece, plus one tie, with a 4–3 victory in game seven. Henderson again scored the winner despite being tripped as he took the shot.

"Here’s a shot ... Henderson made a wild stab for it and fell ... here’s another shot ... right in front ... they score! Henderson has scored for Canada!"

— Canadian announcer Foster Hewitt's call of Henderson's goal to win the eighth game, and the series.

By the eighth game, the competition had become more than a battle for hockey supremacy: it was also viewed as a battle between contrasting ways of life, particularly in the Soviet Union, where success in sport was used to promote the superiority of communism over western capitalism. An estimated 50 million Soviets watched the final contest, while in Canada, offices were closed and schools suspended classes to allow students to watch the game on television in gymnasium assemblies. The two teams ended the first period tied at two goals apiece, but Canada trailed at the second intermission, 5–3, and Soviet officials stated they would claim the overall victory if the game ended in a draw as a result of scoring more goals throughout the series. Canada rallied in the third period to tie the game with seven minutes remaining.

Sitting on the bench as the game entered the final minute of play, Henderson "had a feeling" that he could score. He convinced coach Sinden to send him out when Peter Mahovlich left the ice. Rushing into the Soviet zone, Henderson missed a pass from Yvan Cournoyer in front of the net and was tripped by a Soviet defenceman. As he got to his feet, Phil Esposito recovered the puck and sent it towards Henderson in front of the net. The first shot was stopped by Vladislav Tretiak, but Henderson recovered the rebound and lifted it over the fallen goaltender to give Canada a 6–5 lead with only 34 seconds left to play. It was his seventh goal of the tournament, tying him for the series lead with Esposito and Alexander Yakushev. The goal won the game, and the series, for Canada. The team returned home to massive crowds in Montreal and Toronto, and Paul Henderson had become a national hero.

=== World Hockey Association ===
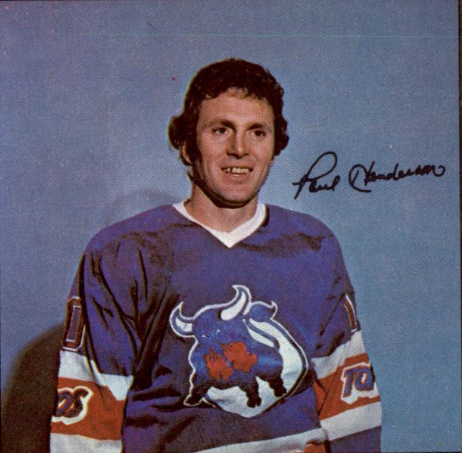
1974-75 card of Henderson for Toronto Toros

Henderson struggled to adjust to his new-found popularity. While he appreciated the support from fans and the business opportunities it created, he grew increasingly frustrated over time as the attention intruded on his private life. In his autobiography, Shooting for Glory, Henderson stated that the fame left him less satisfied than he had ever been. His frustrations with Maple Leafs owner Harold Ballard, who Henderson felt was destroying the team, contributed to his developing an ulcer. (Henderson later admitted he was not mature enough at the time to deal with the acerbic Ballard). He briefly turned to alcohol as he struggled to deal with his situation. Henderson's professional career reached its lowest point during the 1972–73 NHL season. He had become depressed, and by December, had scored only six goals. He struggled with a groin injury and played only 40 games for the Maple Leafs, who missed the playoffs.

Prior to the 1973–74 NHL season, Henderson spoke to John Bassett, owner of the World Hockey Association (WHA)'s Toronto Toros. Bassett offered Henderson a five-year contract worth twice his annual $75,000 salary from the Maple Leafs. The deal included a $50,000 signing bonus and performance bonuses based on how he played in his final year with the Maple Leafs. Henderson signed the contract, though he said in his autobiography that he regretted doing so before completing his term with his NHL club. A bitter opponent of the WHA, Ballard had vowed not to lose more players to the rival league. When he found out about the deal, he offered Henderson the same contract terms, but without a signing bonus. Upset at how stingy Ballard had been with his teammates, Henderson told Ballard to "take this contract and shove it". An angered Ballard never forgave Henderson, and never spoke to him again.

Following a 24-goal campaign in his final season with the Maple Leafs, Henderson officially moved to the WHA where he played in another tournament against the Soviets. While the original series was restricted to players from the NHL, the 1974 Summit Series featured a Canadian team made up of WHA players. The series lacked the intensity of the original, yet Henderson felt that he played well: he scored two goals and an assist, and though Canada finished with one win, four losses and three ties, he felt the WHA had proven itself. Henderson scored 33 goals and 63 points in the 1974–75 WHA season for the Toros while playing 58 games. He missed the playoffs after tearing his knee ligaments in a game against the Phoenix Roadrunners when colliding with Bob Mowat, an opposing player during a line change.

Henderson scored 24 goals and 55 points in 1975–76, his last in Toronto. Following that season, the Toros relocated to Alabama where they became the Birmingham Bulls. While his contract stipulated he did not have to relocate with the team, Henderson appreciated the chance to move to a city where he could play in relative anonymity. He played the final three years of his contract in Birmingham, scoring 23, 37 and 24 goals, but made only one playoff appearance during his five WHA seasons, in 1978.

=== Atlanta Flames ===
The WHA merged with the NHL following the 1978–79 season. Birmingham was not invited to join the NHL; the team instead joined the Central Hockey League for the 1979–80 season and became a minor league affiliate of the Atlanta Flames. Henderson considered retiring, but his family had settled in Birmingham and he knew they could remain in the United States only as long as he was employed. The Flames offered him a spot on their roster, but he preferred to remain with his family. He signed a two-year contract with the Flames on the promise that he would stay in Birmingham unless the team needed his services as a result of injury to other players. He spent the majority of the season in Birmingham, but when Atlanta did struggle with injuries, they recalled him for 30 games where he scored seven goals and six assists. Henderson also appeared in four playoff games. In his final game at Toronto's Maple Leaf Gardens, Henderson led the Flames to a 5–1 win over the Maple Leafs with a two-goal effort, resulting in his being named the game's first star.

Henderson intended the 1980–81 season to be his last as a player. He was again offered a spot on the Flames, in part to help develop the team's young players, but the franchise had relocated to Canada to become the Calgary Flames and Henderson chose to remain with Birmingham, as a player and assistant coach. He missed several games due to injuries but scored six goals in 33 games. However, the Bulls fell into financial difficulty and on February 23, 1981, the team ceased operations mid-season. Choosing not to leave his Birmingham home, Henderson retired as a player and spent the remainder of the season as a scout for the Flames.

== Legacy ==
Henderson celebrates the series-winning goal while being embraced by Cournoyer. The award-winning photograph, taken by Frank Lennon, has been called "one of the ten images that changed Canada".

Though he was not considered a good puck handler, Henderson was a fast skater and was known for his skills at shooting the puck. His career spanned 19 professional seasons during which he played over 1,000 major league games in the NHL and WHA. He scored 376 goals and 760 points between the two leagues and was a two-time NHL all-star, playing in the 1972 and 1973 All-Star Games. His career, however, was defined by the goal he scored on September 28, 1972, to win the Summit Series for Canada. It is the most famous goal in Canadian hockey history and was the defining moment for a generation of Canadians. Decades later, Henderson remains a national hero. The Canadian Press named Henderson's goal the "sports moment of the century" in 2000. The jersey worn by Henderson when he scored the goal was sold at auction for over $1 million in 2010, thought to be the highest price ever paid for a hockey sweater.

Frank Lennon's photograph, taken moments after the goal and showing a jubilant Henderson being embraced by Yvan Cournoyer, has been "etched into the visual cortex of every Canadian". The photo won a National Newspaper Award and has been reproduced by the Royal Canadian Mint on coins. It was also named Canadian Press photograph of the year.

Sportswriters and fans have frequently called for Henderson to be inducted into the Hockey Hall of Fame on the strength of his performance. Commentator and former NHL coach Don Cherry argued that Henderson's status as hero of the "greatest series in hockey history" was enough to qualify him. Henderson himself does not believe he belongs: "So many Canadians get upset that I’m not in the Hall of Fame, and I tell them all the time if I was on the committee, I wouldn’t vote for me. Quite frankly, I didn’t have a Hall of Fame career." Henderson has been honoured by Canada's Sports Hall of Fame on two occasions: he was first inducted as an individual in 1995, and again ten years later along with his 1972 teammates. The Summit Series team has also been honoured with a star on Canada's Walk of Fame. Henderson has been inducted into the Ontario Sports Hall of Fame (1997), the IIHF Hall of Fame (2013) and has been honoured by Hockey Canada with the Order of Hockey in Canada as part of its 2013 class. He was named a Member of the Order of Canada in the 2013 Canadian honours in recognition of "his engagement in support of a range of social and charitable causes" along with his achievements on the ice. In 2014, he was named to the Order of Ontario.

== Personal life ==
Henderson and his wife Eleanor have three daughters: Heather, Jennifer and Jill. The family remained in Birmingham for a time following his retirement as a player. He had an opportunity to become a colour commentator for Maple Leafs broadcasts in 1981 but Ballard, still upset that Henderson had defected to the WHA, prevented his hiring. In Birmingham, he became a stockbroker, briefly joining brokerage firm E. F. Hutton. However, he was unable to get a work permit in the United States despite a petition signed by thousands of Birmingham residents who fought for him to stay.

Following the high of the 1972 Summit Series and the personal lows that came after, Henderson struggled with a sense of discontentment. He turned to religion, becoming a born-again Christian in 1975. Unable to work as a broker, Henderson entered the seminary and studied to become a minister. When he finally gave up his efforts to acquire an American work visa in 1984, he returned to Toronto. Under the auspices of Power to Change Ministries, formerly Campus Crusade for Christ Canada, he founded a men's ministry in Ontario called LeaderImpact and travels across Canada giving talks and speeches, particularly to businessmen. He has received an honorary doctorate from Briercrest College and Seminary and an honorary degree from Tyndale University College and Seminary.

Henderson is also a published author. His autobiography, Shooting for Glory, was released in 1992. With Jim Prime, he co-authored the 2011 book How Hockey Explains Canada, an exploration of the relationship between the sport and Canadian culture. He released a memoir in 2012 called The Goal of My Life with Roger Lajoie.

The death of his father due to heart problems at the age of 49 had a lasting effect on Henderson. He was conscious of his own health, and survived a blockage in his own heart that was discovered in 2004. He was diagnosed with chronic lymphocytic leukemia in 2009. The disease prevented him from attending 40th anniversary celebrations of the Summit Series in Moscow, but he was responding well to experimental treatment as part of a clinical trial he participated in into 2013.

== Awards and honours ==
- J. Ross Robertson Cup (1962)
- Memorial Cup (1962)
- NHL All-Star Game (1972, 1973)
- Canada's Sports Hall of Fame (1995, 2005)
- Order of Canada (2012)
- IIHF Hall of Fame (2013)
- Order of Ontario (2014)

== Career statistics ==
=== Regular season and playoffs ===
			Regular season					Playoffs
Season	Team	League	GP	G	A	Pts	PIM	GP	G	A	Pts	PIM
1960–61	Hamilton Red Wings	OHA	30	1	3	4	9	12	1	1	2	4
1961–62	Hamilton Red Wings	OHA	50	24	19	43	68	10	4	6	10	13
1962–63	Hamilton Red Wings	OHA	48	49	27	76	53	3	2	0	2	0
1962–63	Detroit Red Wings	NHL	2	0	0	0	9	—	—	—	—	—
1963–64	Pittsburgh Hornets	AHL	38	10	14	24	18	—	—	—	—	—
1963–64	Detroit Red Wings	NHL	32	3	3	6	14	14	2	3	5	6
1964–65	Detroit Red Wings	NHL	70	8	13	21	30	7	0	2	2	0
1965–66	Detroit Red Wings	NHL	69	22	24	46	34	12	3	3	6	10
1966–67	Detroit Red Wings	NHL	46	21	19	40	10	—	—	—	—	—
1967–68	Detroit Red Wings	NHL	50	13	20	33	35	—	—	—	—	—
1967–68	Toronto Maple Leafs	NHL	13	5	6	11	8	—	—	—	—	—
1968–69	Toronto Maple Leafs	NHL	74	27	32	59	16	4	0	1	1	0
1969–70	Toronto Maple Leafs	NHL	67	20	22	42	18	—	—	—	—	—
1970–71	Toronto Maple Leafs	NHL	72	30	30	60	34	6	5	1	6	4
1971–72	Toronto Maple Leafs	NHL	73	38	19	57	32	5	1	2	3	6
1972–73	Toronto Maple Leafs	NHL	40	18	16	34	18	—	—	—	—	—
1973–74	Toronto Maple Leafs	NHL	69	24	31	55	40	4	0	2	2	2
1974–75	Toronto Toros	WHA	58	30	33	63	18	—	—	—	—	—
1975–76	Toronto Toros	WHA	65	26	29	55	22	—	—	—	—	—
1976–77	Birmingham Bulls	WHA	81	23	25	48	30	—	—	—	—	—
1977–78	Birmingham Bulls	WHA	80	37	29	66	22	5	1	1	2	0
1978–79	Birmingham Bulls	WHA	76	24	27	51	20	—	—	—	—	—
1979–80	Birmingham Bulls	CHL	47	17	18	35	10	—	—	—	—	—
1979–80	Atlanta Flames	NHL	30	7	6	13	6	4	0	0	0	0
1980–81	Birmingham Bulls	CHL	35	6	11	17	38	—	—	—	—	—
WHA totals			360	140	143	283	112	5	1	1	2	0
NHL totals			707	236	241	477	304	56	11	14	25	28

=== International ===
Year	Team	Event	GP	G	A	Pts	PIM
1972	Canada	SS	8	7	3	10	4
1974	Canada	SS	7	2	1	3	0
Senior totals			15	9	4	13	4
