= Cru (Christian organization) =

Christian parachurch organization for students

- Formation: 1951
- Founders: Bill Bright and Vonette Zachary Bright
- Type: Christian Fellowship; Social Club; University Student Society; Non-profit 501(c)3 organization
- Headquarters: Orlando, Florida, U.S.
- President: David Robbins
- Subsidiaries: FamilyLife
- Affiliations: Chicago Agreement: Unity in Mission
- Website: www.cru.org
- Formerly called: Campus Crusade for Christ International

Cru (until 2011 known as Campus Crusade for Christ—informally "Campus Crusade" or simply "Crusade"—or CCC) is an interdenominational Christian parachurch organization. It was founded in 1951 at the University of California, Los Angeles, by Bill Bright and Vonette Zachary Bright as a Christian ministry focused on university students. Since then, Cru has expanded its focus to include a broad range of audiences. In 2020, the organization had 19,000 staff members in 190 countries.

Campus Crusade for Christ relocated its world headquarters from Arrowhead Springs, San Bernardino, California, to Orlando, Florida, in 1991. The president of the organization is David Robbins. In 2011, Campus Crusade for Christ changed its name in the United States to Cru. The name change was intended to avoid association with the word crusade, which can lead to offense, especially to Muslims. A spokesperson for Cru also noted that the organization's work is no longer limited to campuses.

Influenced by Henrietta Mears and evangelist Billy Graham, Bill Bright left his seminary studies to launch the organization, which rapidly expanded across U.S. campuses during the 1950s and 1960s. Cru became known for its conservative evangelical theology, strong anti-Communist stance, and the development of evangelistic tools such as the "Four Spiritual Laws" (1957), one of the most widely distributed religious booklets in history, with over 2.5 billion copies printed in more than 200 languages. Over time, Cru diversified its ministries, launching initiatives such as Athletes in Action, the Jesus Film Project, FamilyLife, and international outreach programs, while also playing a prominent role in large-scale events like Explo '72, often referred to as the "Christian Woodstock."

During the 1970s and 1980s, Cru increasingly aligned with the American evangelical conservative movement, supporting causes such as complementarian gender roles, opposition to abortion, and abstinence-focused campaigns, while also cultivating ties with Republican political figures and the Moral Majority. Its Jesus Film Project (1981) became one of the most significant global evangelistic tools, translated into hundreds of languages and reportedly viewed billions of times. Cru also expanded internationally, with large presences in regions such as South Korea, Nigeria, and the Philippines. In recent years, Cru has faced internal debates over issues of race, diversity, sexuality, and theology, reflecting broader cultural and generational shifts within American evangelicalism. It remains one of the largest Christian parachurch organizations in the world.

== History ==
=== Early beginnings ===
Campus Crusade for Christ was founded in 1951 at the University of California, Los Angeles by Bill Bright and Vonette Zachary Bright as a ministry for university students. According to historian John G. Turner, Bill Bright and Vonette Zachary Bright were influenced and mentored by Henrietta Mears, the director of Christian Education at the First Presbyterian Church of Hollywood. In addition, Bill was also influenced by the theology and teachings of the prominent American evangelist Billy Graham. While studying at Fuller Theological Seminary, Bright felt what he regarded as the call of God to reach out to university students. Abandoning his studies at Fuller, Bright started Campus Crusade at the UCLA campus.

By 1952, Campus Crusade saw 250 UCLA students join them in following Jesus Christ including decathlete and future film actor Rafer Johnson. With the establishment of other Campus Crusade branches in other universities, the ministry hired six staff members. In 1956, Bright developed a 20-minute evangelistic presentation called "God's Plan For Your Life," which set the tone for Campus Crusade's evangelism and discipleship programs. In 1953, Campus Crusade rented a tiny office on Westwood Avenue in Los Angeles, which served as the organization's headquarters until the 1960s. According to Turner, Cru's expansion across US university campuses during the 1950s and 1960s created friction with existing Christian campus groups including the InterVarsity Christian Fellowship and liberal campus chaplains.

According to Turner, Campus Crusade had a conservative evangelical and anti-Communist orientation. While Bill Bright initially cultivated friendly relations with the fundamentalist Bob Jones University (BJU), Bright's relations with Bob Jones Sr. and his son Bob Jones Jr. deteriorated after the former sided with Billy Graham, who had accepted the sponsorship of liberal Protestants during his 1957 New York City crusade. As a result, Bob Jones University ended its support for Campus Crusade. Turner argues that the deterioration of Campus Crusade's relationship with BJU led the former to gravitate towards the "new evangelical" wing of the American evangelical Protestant movement by late 1958.

Following the split with Bob Jones University, Campus Crusade came to emphasize the importance of the Holy Spirit in its theological teaching and evangelical outreaches, which coincided with the growth of the Pentecostal and Charismatic Movements during the 1950s and 1960s. While Bright and Campus Crusade did cultivate friendly contacts with Pentecostal and charismatics, Bright disagreed with the Pentecostal and Charismatic theological view that glossolalia (speaking in tongues) was a manifestation of the Holy Spirit. As the wedge between evangelicals and charismatics deepened during the 1960s, Campus Crusade issued a ruling in 1960 banning staff members from "speaking in tongues." During the mid-1960s, Campus Crusade adopted the cessationist standpoint that spiritual gifts such as the speaking of tongues, prophecy, and healing had ceased with the Apostolic age. According to Turner, the dispensationalist theologian Robert Thieme had an influence on Bill and Campus Crusade's opposition to glossolalia; which prevented Campus Crusade from forming close ties with Pentecostal and Charismatic Christians.

Following a fundraising drive and some litigation with local authorities, Campus Crusade opened a headquarters in Arrowhead Springs, San Bernardino, California in the Arrowhead Springs Hotel. This facility was equipped with a series of dormitories to accommodate thousands of students who received evangelistic training. During the mid-1960s, Campus Crusade's rapid expansion led to the creation of separate overseas, lay, and athletic ministries. Some notable former Campus Crusade staff members have included the evangelist Hal Lindsey, author of the apocalyptic The Late, Great Planet Earth, and Marabel Morgan, the author of The Total Woman.

=== "Four Spiritual Laws" ===
In 1957, Bill Bright developed the "Four Spiritual Laws" talking points in consultation with the salesman Bob Ringer after he and his team encountered difficulty disseminating the gospel message. The "Four Spiritual Laws" consisted of the following points:

- God loves you and has a wonderful plan for your life.
- Man is sinful and separated from God, thus he cannot know and experience God's plan for life.
- Jesus Christ is God's provision for man's sin through whom man can know God's love and plan for his life.
- We must receive Jesus Christ as Savior and Lord by personal invitation.

In 1965, the Toledo businessman Gus Yeager took the initiative to compile the "Four Spiritual Laws" into a booklet, which was accompanied by supporting Bible verses, some commentary, and support diagrams. Bright had large quantities of the booklet printed and distributed in campuses across the United States. These "Four Spiritual Laws" presented a concise, four-step process of how to become a Christian and became one of the most widely distributed religious booklets in history. By 2006, the booklet had been translated into over 200 languages and more than 2.5 billion copies had been distributed worldwide. Due to its simplicity, it continues to be used in various forms by Cru and its international affiliates.

=== Confronting the counterculture movement ===
To compete with contemporary popular musicians such as the Beatles and Bob Dylan, Campus Crusade sponsored its own Christian popular music band called the New Folk. According to historian John G. Turner, Campus Crusade under Bright's leadership also actively sought to confront the counterculture movement during the 1960s and 1970s. One notable Campus Crusade campaign was the "Berkeley Blitz" in January 1967 which saw 600 Campus Crusade staff and students organize a series of events including concerts, dinners for international students, a performance by the illusionist André Kole, and a sermon by evangelist Billy Graham. Campus Crusade also claimed to have converted 700 students and faculty members.

During the late 1960s, Campus Crusade in line with its conservative, anti-Communist orientation organized counterdemonstrations against New Left and anti-war demonstrations including those by the left-wing Students for a Democratic Society (SDS). Several Campus Crusade members also took the opportunity to evangelize during the 1968 Democratic National Convention in Chicago. Campus Crusade also ran a hippie–oriented outreach called the Christian World Liberation Front (CWLF) to engage the New Left. CWLF's ministry focused on establishing safe houses and "crash pads" for drug addicts, infiltrating SDS meetings, and persuading student radicals to abandon violence. While CWLF received funding and support from Campus Crusade, the latter was discreet to conceal its involvement to avoid antagonizing conservative donors and potential CWLF converts.

In 1972, Campus Crusade in coordination with the Jesus Movement organized a week-long International Student Congress on Evangelism at Cotton Bowl Stadium in Dallas known as Explo '72. The Explo '72 conference featured evangelism and discipleship training and contemporary music events. It was attended by 80,000 college and high school students and was nicknamed as the "Christian Woodstock" in the media. Besides Billy Graham, the event featured several contemporary popular musicians including Johnny Cash, Kris Kristofferson, the Christian band Love Song, Andraé Crouch, and the Disciples.

The historian Turner regards Explo '72 as Campus Crusade's first significant exposure to the mainstream media and a success due to the positive media coverage. Turner also argues that Campus Crusade during the 1970s sought to become more "socially aware" by recruiting more African American speakers and delegates. According to Turner, the large Pentecostal and charismatic presence at Explo '72 signaled Bright adopting a more conciliatory stance towards the Charismatic movement. However, Campus Crusade maintained its opposition to glossolalia.

=== 1970s and 1980s – riding the conservative wave ===
During the 1970s and 1980s, Campus Crusade increasingly became aligned with conservative politics, moral, and social positions. During the mid-1970s, Campus Crusade started a family outreach called FamilyLife to promote a biblical view of the family, gender roles, homosexuality, and abortion. Bill Bright objected to what he regarded as the "breakdown of the American family" and advocated a return to biblical values. As part of the Evangelical Bicentennial of 1976, Campus Crusade launched an evangelism drive called "I Found It" which targeted 246 cities and involved 300,000 Christian volunteers from 15,000 churches.

In addition, Campus Crusade worked with other evangelical leaders including Jack W. Hayford, Pat Robertson, Pat Boone, William L. Armstrong, and Billy James Hargis to build relationships with US politicians, particularly within the Republican Party, through outreaches such as Christian Embassy. Bill Bright was also supportive of the Moral Majority and President Ronald Reagan, who was popular with many of Bright's evangelical contemporaries. Two Campus Crusade staff members, Jerry Regier and Robert Pittenger, also participated in the White House Conference on Families and the National Affairs Briefing in 1980. According to the historian Turner, Bill Bright and Campus Crusade's conservative political leanings created friction with the left-leaning evangelist Jim Wallis.

During the 1980s, Bright attempted to establish a graduate university for Campus Crusade called the International Christian Graduate University in La Jolla, San Diego. However, the project was fraught by fundraising problems, which almost bankrupted Campus Crusade. It also attracted opposition from the mayor of San Diego Roger Hedgecock and a coalition of environmentalist groups including the Sierra Club, who supported a ballot in November 1985 requiring the city's voters to approve any developmental projects in San Diego's northern land reserve. In March 1986, Campus Crusade filed a lawsuit against San Diego for US$70 million plus interest. However, the lawsuit failed, and Crusade's subsidiary, University Development, filed for bankruptcy when a lender foreclosed on the property in late 1986. Texas land developer Glenn Terrell helped Crusade offset its debts by purchasing the property.

During the 1980s, Campus Crusade increased its cooperation with the charismatic, Pentecostal, and Catholic churches and denominations. Bright's personal friendships with charismatic and Pentecostal Christians and Zachary Bright's charismatic experience led Campus Crusade to soften its stance towards charismatic and Pentecostal churches. In 1983, Campus Crusade overturned its ban on staff members speaking in tongues. During the late 1980s, Campus Crusade also partnered with the Assemblies of God in missionary work in Africa and Latin America. In addition, Campus Crusade also collaborated with the Catholic Church to distribute the Jesus film in Catholic countries.

=== 1990s and 2000s ===
During the late 1980s and 1990s, Campus Crusade's Family First ministry endorsed the complementarian position that men and women have different but complementary roles and responsibilities in marriage, family life, and religious leadership. Bill and Vonette Bright served as board members of the pro-complementarian Council on Biblical Manhood and Womanhood and signed the Danvers Statement. The historian Turner credits FamilyLife Director Dennis Rainey with advancing the complementarian position among Campus Crusade's leadership. In 1993, FamilyLife published the Family Manifesto emphasizing male leadership over the family and the female role as nurturers. In 1999, Campus Crusade adopted the Southern Baptist Convention's doctrinal statement on the family endorsing complementarianism. Campus Crusade has also endorsed the traditional evangelical positions on homosexuality and abortion. During the early 2000s, its family ministry FamilyLife supported California's Proposition 22 and opposed gay marriage.

In 1991, Campus Crusade moved its world headquarters from Arrowhead Springs, California, to Orlando, Florida. In 1992, Campus Crusade partnered with Co-Mission to evangelize in the former Soviet Union. During the 1990s, Campus Crusade launched a series of campus media campaigns promoting sexual abstinence and opposing alcoholism and racism. In 1996, Crusade drew controversy when it published advertisements containing testimonies by "former homosexuals" during the National Coming Out Week; several newspapers either declined to run the ads, or published editorial rebuttals.

To combat the under-representation of African American and other ethnic minorities during the late 1970s and 1980s, Campus Crusade launched several ethnic-based student movements during the early 1990s. In 1991, Tom Fritz founded the Impact movement which sought to reach African Americans by organizing regional conferences featuring Gospel music. To appeal to Black students, Campus Crusade launched advertising campaigns highlighting biblical arguments against racism and promoting the African roots of Christianity. The Epic and Destino movements were also launched to reach Asian American and Latino students. In addition, the Korea Campus Crusade for Christ, now known as SOON Movement, also opened chapters in the West Coast to accommodate the Korean-American diaspora.

In 2000, Bill Bright designated Steve Douglass, executive vice president and director of U.S. Ministries, as his successor. Douglass assumed the presidency of Campus Crusade in August 2001. On July 19, 2011, it was announced that Campus Crusade for Christ in the United States was changing its name to Cru to overcome existing barriers and perceptions inherent in the original name, particularly among Muslim communities.

In April 2020, Steve Douglass announced that due to health concerns, he would be stepping down from his role as president. On September 2, 2020, Cru announced that Steve Sellers, Executive Vice President and U.S. National Director would take over from Steve Douglass as president, effective in early October.

Most recently, Cru is wrestling with troublesome divides amongst its members in regards to how race and diversity fit into its mission. As American culture as a whole critically examines and revolutionizes its perception of race, Cru is now trying to do the same in an effort to parallel these new developments. However, where some argue that these new adjustments in the theology and structure of the organization encourage much-needed diversity and promote the Christian ideals of acceptance and unconditional love, others push back, claiming that the issue of race is being overemphasized, causes divisiveness and disharmony, and that it distracts from the mission of the organization and from the gospel itself.

== Ministries and partners ==
The historian John G. Turner and pastor and theologian David Cobia have described Cru or Campus Crusade as a parachurch organization, Christian organizations that exist alongside the institutional church (denominations and congregations). Throughout its history, Cru or Campus Crusade was best known for disseminating the "Four Spiritual Laws", a four-step gospel tract developed in 1959 that distilled key evangelical Christian beliefs. By 2006, over 2.5 billion copies of the "Four Spiritual Laws" had been printed. It continues to be used in Cru and its international affiliates' literature.

=== Athletes in Action ===
Among the events sponsored by Athletes in Action is the NFL-sanctioned Super Bowl Breakfast which features the presentation of the Bart Starr Award "to honor the NFL player who best exemplifies outstanding character and leadership in the home, on the field and in the community."

=== Christian Embassy ===
Christian Embassy is an organization for politicians and diplomats.

=== Colleges ===
Despite a failed attempt during the 1980s to establish the International Christian Graduate University in San Diego, Campus Crusade still operates several theological colleges overseas. In 1998, Campus Crusade began running The King's College, a Christian school based in New York City.

=== FamilyLife ===
Following the 1975 evangelical Continental Congress on the Family, Campus Crusade staff members Ney Bailey and Don Meredith created a series of premarital and marriage seminars in response to marital disharmony among Crusade staff members. In response to growing interest from pastors, couples, and community leaders, Campus Crusade opened them to the public in 1978. This ministry became known as FamilyLife and used the Bible as a guide for issues relating to marriage, the family, gender roles, homosexuality, and abortion. While FamilyLife endorsed the male leadership, it also sought to accommodate modern feminism by promoting female leadership in ways that did not threaten traditional gender roles. Since 1976 more than 1.5 million people have attended marriage conferences.

During the 1980s and 1990s, FamilyLife grew rapidly due to the strong emphasis on "family values" in US evangelical political discourses, particularly under the leadership of its director Dennis Rainey. Rainey played an important role in promoting complementarianism among the Campus Crusade leadership. In 1993, FamilyLife published a manifesto called the Family Manifesto promoting male leadership in the family. During the 2000s, FamilyLife joined other conservative advocacy groups such as James Dobson's Focus on the Family and the Family Research Council in marshaling opposition against gay marriage, abortion, and pornography.

Besides lobbying on moral issues, FamilyLife's primary activities included organizing conferences, radio programs, and publications. By 2008, FamilyLife had an annual budget of around US$40 million and had embarked on a $100 million fundraising campaign to build a new headquarters in Little Rock, Arkansas.

=== Inner City ===
Cru's inner city ministry (formerly known as Here's Life Inner City) currently trains and equips churches in 17 cities to meet immediate physical needs, while also providing long-term development programs such as Holistic Hardware for life skills and WorkNet for career preparedness.

=== The Jesus Film Project ===
The Jesus Film Project started in 1981 to translate the Hollywood film Jesus into other languages so that it could be shown by missionaries to peoples around the world in their native languages. The origins of The Jesus Film Project date back to 1945, when Campus Crusade's founder Bill Bright wanted to privately finance a film about the life of Jesus that was entertaining, biblically accurate, and which could be translated into non-English languages. Rather than making a film at that time, Bright instead focused on his campus ministry Campus Crusade.

In 1976, with Campus Crusade's influence spreading beyond college campuses to sports, the marketplace, and other aspects of society, Bright turned his attention once again to filmmaking. That year, the British Jewish film and television producer John Heyman approached Bright to obtain funding for his Jesus film and his Genesis Project to produce film adaptations of both the Old Testament and the New Testament. This meeting proved productive and Bright assigned Paul Eshleman, the director of campus ministry, to consult with the film maker. Despite some unease within Campus Crusade's leadership about hiring a "non-believer" to produce a film on the Bible, Bright approved the project after watching Heyman's short film on the first two chapters of the Gospel of Luke and assigned Eshleman to work full-time on the Jesus film.

While Heyman's initial cut of the Gospel of Luke ran more than four hours, it was shortened considerably following consultation with Bright and Eshleman. The Jesus movie was financed by Campus Crusade supporters Bunker and Caroline Hunt for a sum of US$6 million. The film starred British Shakespearean actor Brian Deacon as Jesus, Rivka Neumann as Mary, Yosef Shiloach as Saint Joseph, and Niko Nitai as Saint Peter.

With the sponsorship of Warner Brothers, the Jesus movie was released in US theaters in late 1980. To promote the film, Eshleman worked with both evangelical and Catholic churches to arrange group trips and discounts. Four million reportedly watched the Jesus film in 1980. Despite its popularity among Christian audiences, Heyman failed to generate enough revenue to subsidize his Genesis Project since the film failed to attract general audiences, leaving the project US$4 million in debt. Following the Jesus movie's completion, the relationship between Campus Crusade and Heyman deteriorated. Heyman was unhappy that Campus Crusade had overlooked his contribution to the film and objected to the ministry making different versions of the film for their evangelism outreaches. During the late 1990s, Heyman sued Campus Crusade for producing a shorter version The Story of Jesus for Children, which included new footage. The parties settled the dispute out of court.

However, Bright was pleased with the film and Campus Crusade embarked on plans to turn Jesus into a global evangelistic tool. Campus Crusade dubbed the film into other languages and the film became part of the "Here's Life, World" campaigns. During the 1980s and 1990s, Campus Crusade produced and distributed dozens of dubbed versions of the Jesus movie in its evangelism outreaches in the developing world. These outreaches led Campus Crusade to partner with the Southern Baptist Convention, charismatic and Pentecostal denominations and churches, and the Catholic Church. In 2000, the Catholic Church collaborated with Campus Crusade to produce a version of the Jesus film that was more attuned to Catholic theology.

Distribution of the Jesus film in the United States has included direct mail campaigns sponsored by churches to deliver a copy of the film to every address in select zip codes across the country. Project leaders claim that it has been viewed over 5 billion times by over 3 billion people. This claim has been greeted with skepticism by an evangelical leader. Vinay Samuel, former executive director of the International Fellowship of Evangelical Mission Theologians has said: "These numbers are, to say the least, not gathered in a social-scientific way," and that "They have no way of knowing this."

=== Josh McDowell Ministries ===
In 1964, Josh McDowell became a traveling representative of Cru addressing campus groups about the Christian faith. By 2008, Josh McDowell Ministry had become a speaking and humanitarian ministry based in Dallas which partnered with Cru. Over the years his ministry has focused on Christian apologetics, youth issues such as relationships and sexuality, and international humanitarian aid.

== Critique and criticism ==
Some criticism of Cru has stemmed from their exclusive stances on sexuality and theology and not allowing practicing LGBTQ or Catholic members as leaders. Cru was not recognized as a student organization by Rollins College in 2018, due to its values which prevent gay people from becoming campus leaders, in violation of the college's non-discrimination policy. While Cru's constitution has a non-discrimination policy, and claims to be "interdenominational", Rollins was concerned that Cru's binding statement of faith could affect the admission of members or the selection of leaders.

Religion scholar Elizabeth McAlister sees Campus Crusade's language of warriors "encouraged to enlist, rally, advance, campaign, and blitz" as part of a broader trend in increasing militaristic language in evangelicalism.

== Fundraising ==
Cru is currently a charter member of the Evangelical Council for Financial Accountability. Prior to the late 1970s, Campus Crusade had raised the vast majority of its revenue by asking families, friends, and churches to pledge funds towards the salaries of its staff members. By the later 1970s, the increasing scale of Campus Crusade's domestic and foreign evangelism projects led the organization to solicit funds from wealthy conservative donors such as Wallace E. Johnson, Roy Rogers, and Nelson Bunker Hunt.

In 2007, Campus Crusade was ranked 107 in fundraising efficiency among the top 200 U.S. charitable organizations, according to Forbes magazine (2007). Ninety-three percent of its funds go directly to programming, and 7% to overhead expenses. In 2008, the Chronicle of Philanthropy ranked Campus Crusade for Christ No. 23 in private funding in its "Chronicle of Philanthropy 400", with annual giving of $514 million. In 2012, Forbes ranked it No. 19 in its list of the largest charities in the United States, with a total revenue of $519 million. The top salary for any Campus Crusade employee was $164,206 in the fiscal year ending 2011. In 2020, Forbes ranked it at No. 25 in the top 100 largest U.S. Charities.

== Worldwide presence ==
Cru Global operates under various names around the world:

- Korea – Korea Campus Crusade for Christ

=== History ===
According to the historian Turner, the Nigerian Idowu Johnson, a student at UCLA, became Campus Crusade's first overseas representative in 1954. After returning to Nigeria, Johnson became an evangelist at his home university. In 1958, the South Korean Dr. Joon Gon Kim became Campus Crusade's first permanent overseas staff member and established the group's first overseas mission. A Pakistani Fuller Seminary student Kundan Massey founded Campus Crusade's first chapter in Pakistan. By the end of the 1950s, Campus Crusade was active in three countries. Campus Crusade's overseas expansion accentuated friction with the InterVarsity Christian Fellowship, which also maintained overseas chapters.

In 1961, Bill and Vonette Bright participated in the evangelistic ministry World Vision's Tokyo crusade and used it as an opportunity to expand Campus Crusade's outreach in Japan. During the 1960s, Campus Crusade's expanded its international outreach and expanded to 45 countries including the United Kingdom. As a result, Bright appointed Ray Nethery and Bob Kendall as directors of the group's work in Asia and Latin America respectively. In 1967, Bill sent 55 Campus Crusade workers to establish the ministry's presence in British universities. Campus Crusade's British outreach became known as Agapé. That same year, branches were established in Canadian and Australian campuses which eventually became known as the Power to Change Ministries.

Following the resignation of Campus Crusade's Asia director Nethery in 1968, Bill Bright appointed Bailey Marks as the new Asia director and tasked him with bringing more organizational unity to Crusade's Asian ministries. After touring the nine Asian countries where Crusade had a presence, Marks built a training center in Manila, the Philippines for the purpose of training all Asian staff in the organization's philosophy and techniques. While Campus Crusade did not abandon its principle of indigenous leadership, more emphasis was placed on ensuring that local leaders followed the organization's policies. Opposition to increased central control led a third of the 90 Asian staff members to resign from Campus Crusade. Their replacements embraced Crusade's evangelism models.

Building on the success of Explo '72, Campus Crusade organized the Explo '74 conference in Seoul, which reportedly attracted 300,000 delegates. One of the conference's evening meetings reportedly attracted an estimated 1.5 million people with 320,000 reportedly converting to Christianity. Bill Bright also expressed support for the conservative, anti-Communist South Korean President Park Chung Hee, who imposed martial law and assumed dictatorial powers in 1972. Bright claimed that the Explo '74 conference indicated that Park's regime preserved religious freedom.

During the late 1970s, Campus Crusade began to shift its emphasis from university evangelism to encouraging students to serve as Crusade missionaries upon graduation. According to the historian Turner, the number of American staff serving overseas doubled to 660 between 1977 and 1981.

In 2011, The New York Times reported that Cru had 25,000 missionaries in 191 countries.

== See also ==
- College religious organizations
- Fellowship of Christian Athletes
- International student ministry
- InterVarsity Christian Fellowship
- Student Venture
