= Arrowhead Springs Hotel =

Hotel and Former Navy Hospital in California

Coordinates: 34.186726°N 117.26291848419305°W

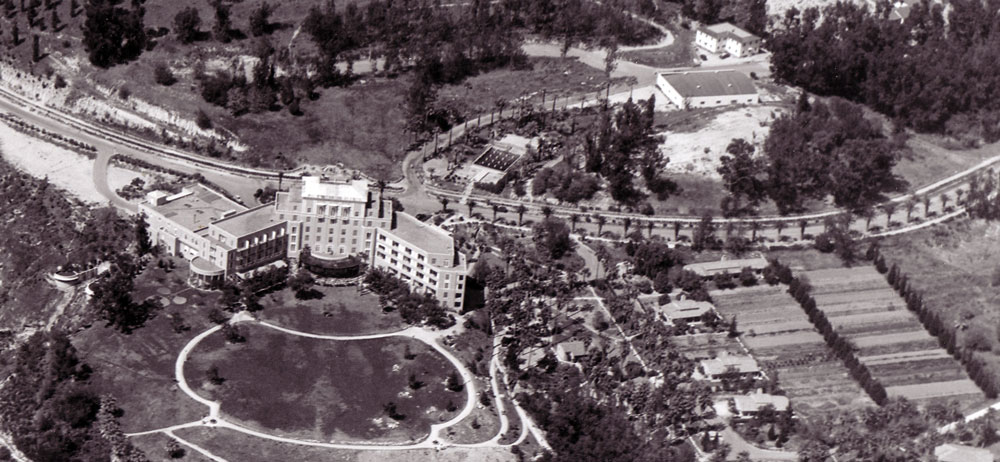
Naval Convalescent Hospital Arrowhead Springs in 1944, the 1939 Arrowhead Springs Hotel

The Arrowhead Springs Hotel a historic defunct resort hotel near the City of Arrowhead Springs, north of San Bernardino, California. It was used as a U.S. Navy medical treatment facility during World War 2. From 1961 to 1992, it was the headquarters of Campus Crusade for Christ. In May 2017, the San Manuel Band of Mission Indians purchased the long-vacant resort.

== History ==
=== Site ===
The site in the San Bernardino Mountains was originally home to the Yuhaaviatam clan of the Serrano people. The site has natural hot springs. On a nearby hill is an arrowhead-shaped natural landmark, which combines to give the place its English language name.

A small tuberculosis sanitarium center with a natural steam cave and mud baths opened in 1864. An 1886 fire burned down the sanitarium building. A new hotel was built in 1905 and at the same time, the Arrowhead Springs Company was founded selling bottled spring water, Arrowhead Springs water.

In 1938 the resort was sold to Hollywood group: Jay Paley, Joseph M. Schenck, Constance Bennett, Al Jolson, Darryl Zanuck and Claudette Colbert for $800,000. The second resort burned down on November 23, 1938.

=== Current hotel building ===
The group spent $1.5 million and built the current resort, designed by architects Paul R. Williams and Gordon Kaufmann in the Georgian style. Ground was broken in January 1939, and the Arrowhead Springs Hotel opened on December 16, 1939.

The hotel had an outdoor swimming pool, a 130-person theater, natural hot springs, a lake, tennis courts, and recreational facilities on 1,700 acres in the mountains. The 150-room main building is a four-story with two wings. The center also had 10 bungalows. The interior was by iconic New York designer Dorothy Draper. Hollywood guests included Charlie Chaplin, Judy Garland, and Clark Gable. Bugsy Siegel was also a regular guest. The resort was used for filming movies, including Humphrey Bogart in High Sierra in 1941.

The hotel was not financially successful, and closed in May 1941. In July, the owners began negotiations with the United States Department of War to sell the hotel for conversion to an Army hospital. However, the negotiations were not completed, and the hotel went into foreclosure in September 1941. Hotelier Thomas E. Hull took possession of the resort on November 15, 1941 and reopened it on November 19 as part of his Hull Hotels chain.

On March 8, 1944, the U.S. Navy announced that it had purchased the 7.5-acre resort for conversion to a 149-room convalescent hospital, Naval Special Hospital, Arrowhead Springs, which opened on May 23, 1944. It was opened to help with the overcrowding at the U.S. Naval Hospital at Corona. In June 1944, 500 patients were transferred from Corona to Arrowhead Springs. In August 1944, the hotel was nearly destroyed by a large brush fire, which came within 100 yards of the building. By November 1945, when the hospital closed, over 5800 troops had been cared for there.

Esther Williams made a movie, Thrill of a Romance, at the resort in 1945. In 1946, the resort was returned to Hull Hotels. On March 8, 1949, Conrad Hilton bought the hotel for $2 million. In 1950 Elizabeth Taylor and Conrad Hilton Jr. honeymooned at the resort. Hilton was not able to make the resort financially successful, closing it for multiple periods, and finally selling it in 1956 to hotelier Benjamin Swig, who operated the hotel for a time, before closing it permanently in 1959. In 1962, he sold the resort to Campus Crusade for Christ, an interdenominational Christian organization, which used the property as a religious retreat, headquarters, training center and conference center. Campus Crusade for Christ moved to Orlando, Florida in 1991 and vacated the hotel. In March 1992, the resort went for sale with no buyers.

In 2017, the vacant resort was sold to the San Manuel Band of Mission Indians.

== Gallery ==
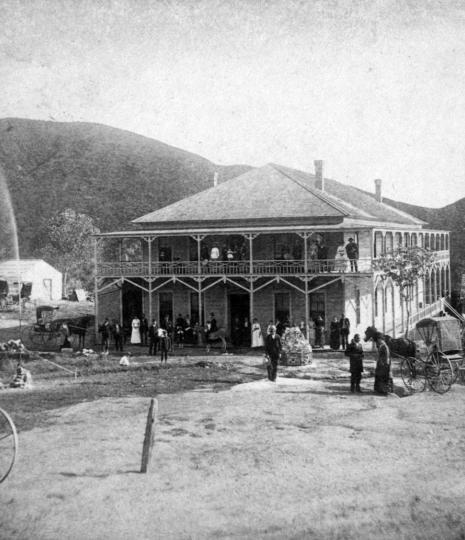
First Arrowhead Springs Hotel, opened in 1864 and burnt down in 1886

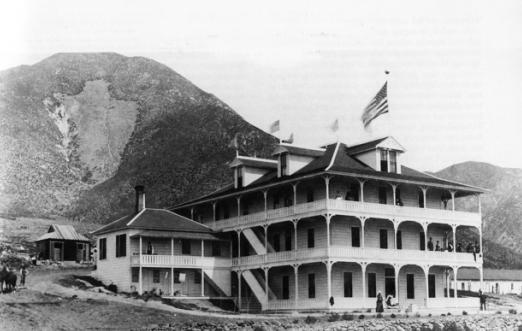
Second Arrowhead Springs Hotel, opened in 1886 and burned in 1895

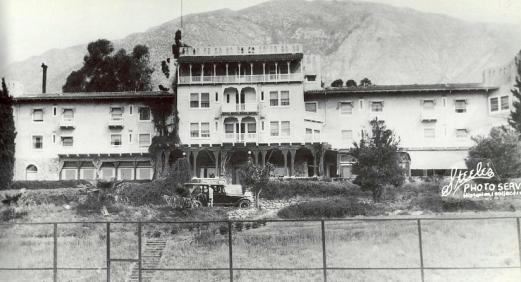
Third Arrowhead Springs Hotel, opened in 1905 and burned in 1939

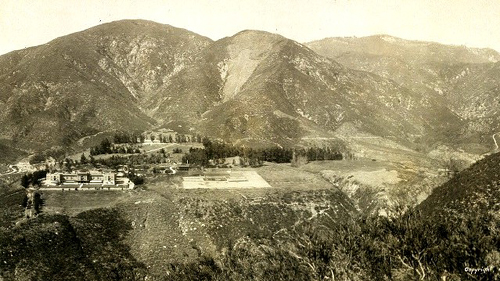
Arrowhead Springs Hotel, circa 1907

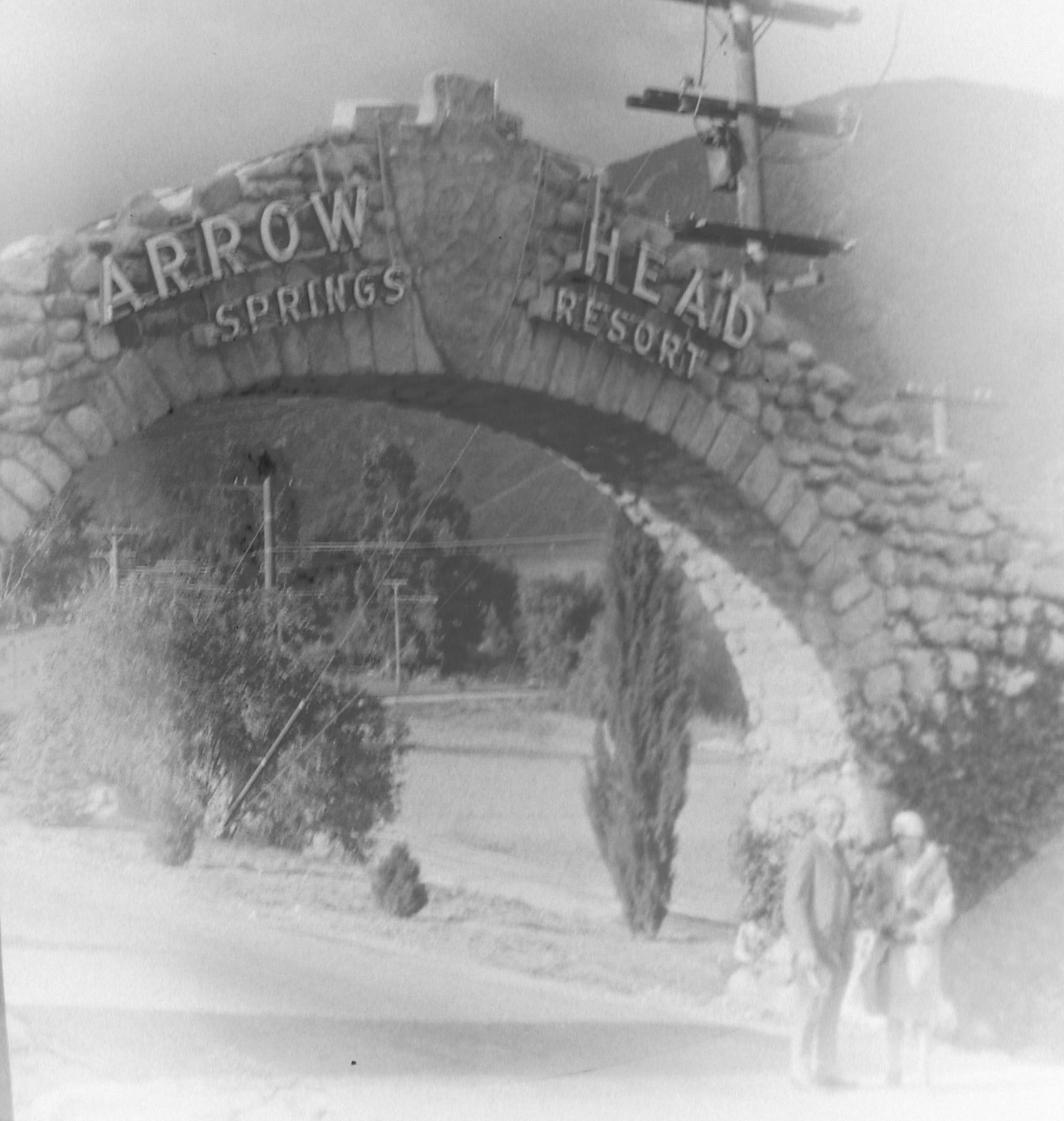
Arrowhead Springs Resort Archway. circa 1929

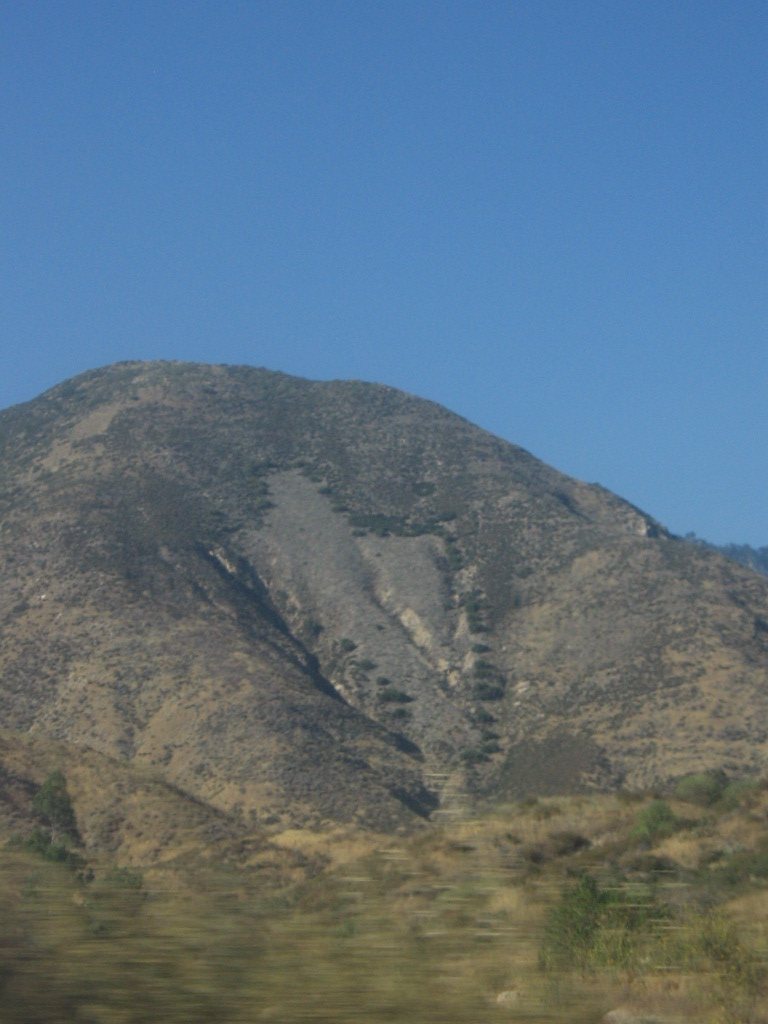
Natural Arrowhead shape near Arrowhead Springs Hotel
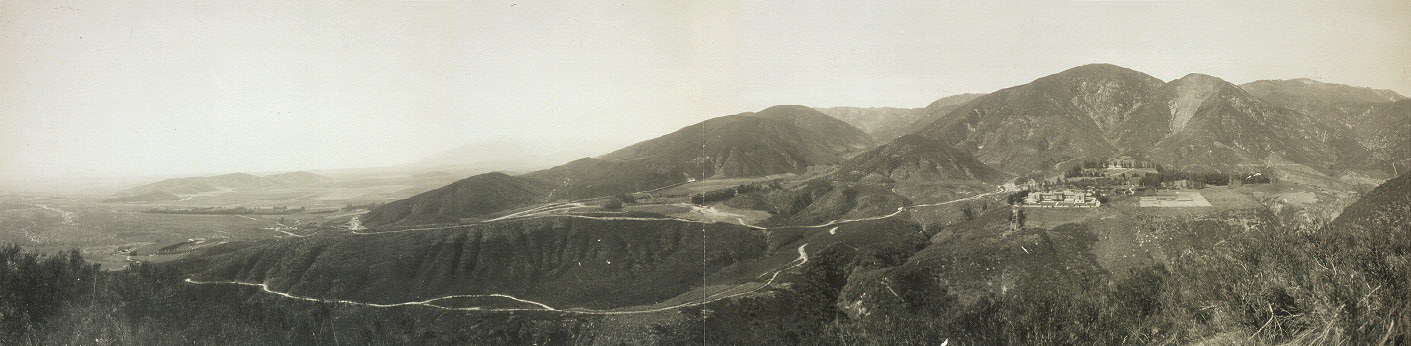
Panorama of the Arrowhead Springs site showing the Arrowhead Hot Springs Hotel, 1908.

== See also ==
- California during World War II
- American Theater (1939–1945)
- United States home front during World War II
- DeWitt General Hospital
