= International student ministry =

Evangelical Christian ministry among international students within an academic context

International Student Ministry (ISM) refers to evangelical Christian ministry among international students within an academic context, often carried out by Protestant college religious organizations, volunteers and churches. It is considered part of the church's mission, within the broader framework of diaspora missions. The first two decades of the 21st century have seen a sharp growth in the number of international students globally with a corresponding development in ISM.

== History ==
ISM traces its modern roots to John R. Mott who established The Committee on Friendly Relations among Foreign Students in 1911, which was the first national ISM in the US. Some international Christian student organizations trace their origins back to the World Student Christian Federation. Since then, and particularly since the 1950s, there has been a growth of organizations doing this mainly in Western contexts. As of 2016 there were at least 57 organizations engaged in ISM in 22 countries.

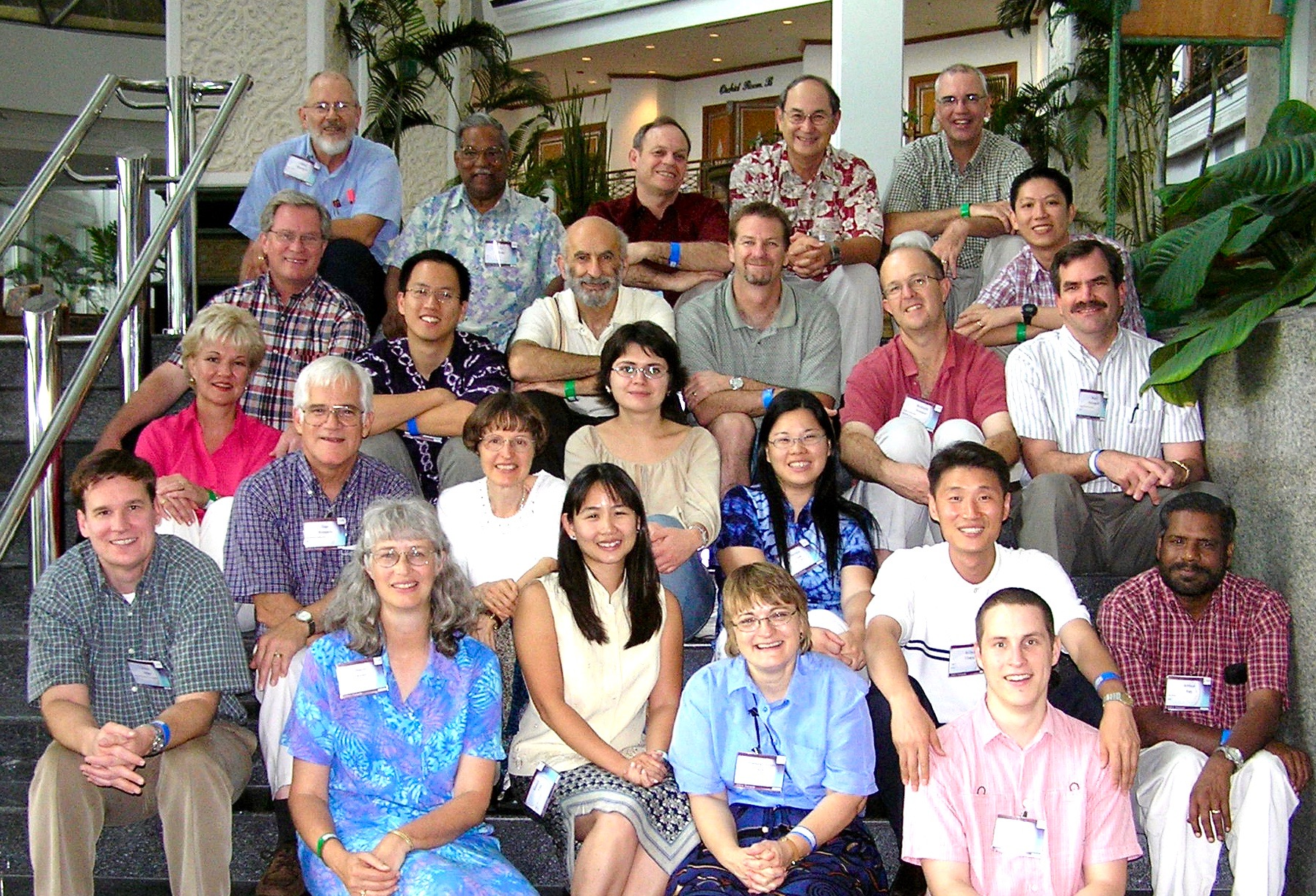
Lausanne ISM Issue Network Leaders Forum, Thailand 2004

In 2004, after a century of intermittent ISM growth Leiton Chinn convened a global gathering in Thailand of ISM leaders, and in 2007 he was appointed the Chair of the Lausanne ISM Issue Network. The two Lausanne Issue Groups of Diaspora and International Students then published Diasporas and International Students: The New People Next Door. Recent publications include those by Yaw Perbi, Jack D. Burke and Enoch Wan. The Lausanne 2010 Cape Town Commitment (section II-C-5) refers to reaching out to international students.

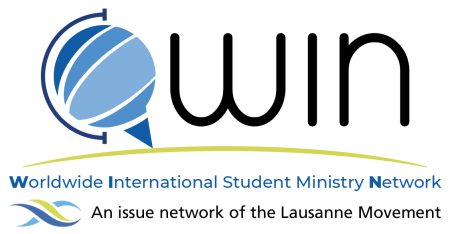
WIN (Worldwide ISM Network)

In May 2014 the Lausanne ISM Global Leadership Network became a "docked network" with the World Evangelical Alliance's Mission Commission. It operates as WIN (Worldwide ISM Network).

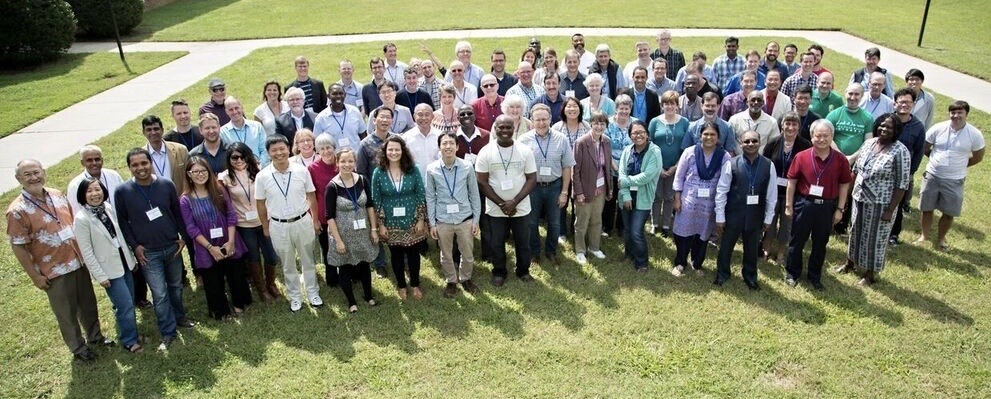
Lausanne Global ISM Leadership Forum in Charlotte, NC, USA in September 2017.

In September 2017 the Lausanne ISM Global Leadership Network hosted a global ISM forum Charlotte '17 which gathered 100 participants from 25 countries and 70 organizations.

It is suggested that ISM is grounded in the Missio Dei and is motivated by biblical precedent and trends in migration. Chinn outlines ten reasons why ISM is strategic in relation to the Great Commission and nine reasons why it benefits local churches.

== Networks and organizations ==
Individual churches, such as Park Street Congregational Church in Boston, have welcoming ministries reaching international students. This modality-based model of ISM is attractive because every church member can be involved in cross-cultural mission at virtually no expense. Miller outlines key qualities leading to successful ISM by local churches. Chinn and Jones point out 6 strategic outcomes for international churches intentionally including international students in their ministry focus. Perbi and Brewster argue that ISM will be strengthened by the intentional involvement of "workplace Christians." Some denominational groups have established an ISM focus such as Anglican (USA), Lutheran Church (Missouri Synod), Assemblies of God (USA) and the Presbyterian Church in America.

A 2019 study based in the US concluded that "Chinese international undergraduate students identify the church and its fellowship as (1) a social support community and (2) an informal learning community, one which fills in the gap in counseling services and interpersonal activities that the university fails to offer."

Christian campus organizations, which are sodalities, have historically focused on domestic university students. These have developed campus-based ministries for international students directly linked to universities or colleges.

At a global level, the Lausanne Committee for World Evangelization has an ISM issue network which connects groups internationally and interdenominationally. This network now includes a North American network on ISM. The Association for Christians Ministering Among Internationals (ACMI) is another ISM networking body. Networking between European ISMs has been identified as a priority.

== Trends ==
Recent decades have seen a rapid increase in international student populations concurrent with the plateauing of some western markets, most notably the US. Students are turning to non-traditional centers of education, such as Asia. This shift is underpinned by well-formed international education policy of countries like China, Malaysia, Singapore and India.

The areas of diaspora missiology and its subset, international student ministry, have seen a theological and academic maturing. In 2018/2019 three key ISM-specific training resources were launched: the Lausanne Global Classroom, EveryInternational, and Look at the Fields Two ISM training workshops ran at the International Fellowship of Evangelical Students (IFES) World Assembly in July 2019. While practical ISM training is offered by a number of ISM organisations, the Charlotte '17 conference considered the need for academic training and research in ISM led by seminaries and graduate schools. Columbia International University lists a course called "Mission to International Students" in their 2019-2020 Academic Catalog.

Global mission sending organizations are recognizing the strategic nature and necessity of diaspora missions, and especially ISM. Some have refocused ISM efforts in traditional contexts because of the perceived global impact. Asia has been identified as an emerging region for ISM. It is beginning to take shape there, for example among international churches in China. Regarding the international students in, from and within Asia, Phil Jones has identified 8 challenges and 6 opportunities that Asian ISMs encounter. In tandem with the Indian hospitality concept of Atithi Devo Bhava ("the guest is god"), Emmanuel F. Benjamin describes the impact of welcoming foreign students in Pune, India.

Nascent ISMs exist in South Africa, Kenya and Ghana. Bill Dindi of Kenya explores the viability, trends and features of ISM in Africa. Identifying the gaps and opportunities, he seeks to "build a case for a more robust ministry among international students in Africa as well as the approaches and shape this might take." Citing the historical growth of Christianity in Africa and the central role of Christian African international students, Perbi and Ngugi argue that the continent that was a mission field now comprises a mission force. Kwiverr's 2022 research of 116 respondents from 16 African countries revealed that there are many "largely unaware and unprepared African Christian International Students [who are] virtually unseen and unsent by the African Church, the most populous and youngest in the world." Perbi's analysis in the Journal of African Christian Thought argues that international students to and from Africa have unrecognized and untapped ramifications for mission.

A global consultation of ISM leaders in September 2020 was called to assess whether ISM was still meaningful or viable given the impacts of the COVID-19 pandemic.
