= Bill Bright =

American evangelist (1921–2003)

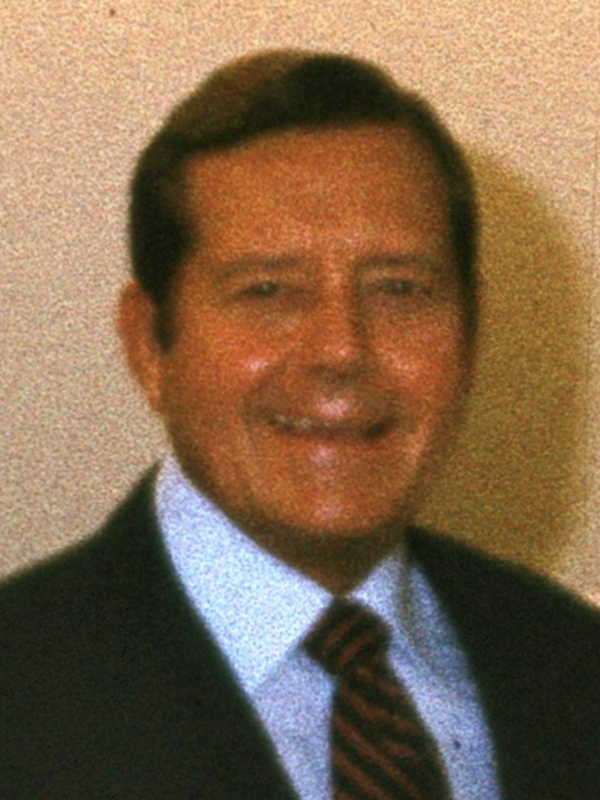
- Bill Bright (1980)
- Born: October 19, 1921; Coweta, Oklahoma, U.S.
- Died: July 19, 2003 (aged 81); Orlando, Florida, U.S.
- Education: Northeastern State University; Princeton Theological Seminary; Fuller Theological Seminary
- Known for: Campus Crusade for Christ
- Spouse: Vonette Zachary (m. 1948)

William R. Bright (October 19, 1921 – July 19, 2003) was an American evangelist. In 1951 at the University of California, Los Angeles, he founded Campus Crusade for Christ as a ministry for university students. In 1952 he wrote The Four Spiritual Laws. In 1979 he produced the film Jesus.

In 1996 Bill Bright was awarded the $1.1 million Templeton Prize for Progress in Religion, and donated the money to promote the spiritual benefits of fasting and prayer. In 2001 he stepped down as leader of the organization and Steve Douglass became president. He died in 2003.

== Early life and education ==
Bill Bright was born in Coweta, Oklahoma, on October 19, 1921. He was the sixth child and fifth son of Forrest Dale and Mary Lee Rohl Bright. His father was a cattle rancher while his mother was a school teacher prior to marriage. His father was actively involved in the Oklahoma Republican Party, with Bill remaining a Republican throughout his life. Bill studied economics at Northeastern State University in Tahlequah, Oklahoma. As a student at Northeastern State University, he was initiated into the Zeta chapter of the Sigma Tau Gamma fraternity, and has subsequently been granted honorable alumnus status to the Alpha Gamma Omega Christ-Centered Fraternity. In 1942, Bright enlisted in the United States Navy Reserve but did not see combat service due to a burst eardrum from playing football during high school.

While in his early 20s he moved to Los Angeles, California, and founded a company called Bright's California Confections. During the 1940s, Bright attended the First Presbyterian Church, Hollywood, where he became an evangelical Christian. Bright was influenced by Henrietta Mears, who served as the Director of Christian Education at First Presbyterian Church, and Billy Graham, who later became a prominent American evangelical leader.

In 1946, Bright quit his candy business to pursue Biblical studies and theology at Princeton Theological Seminary and Fuller Theological Seminary. According to the historian John G. Turner, Bright struggled with his academic studies and did not complete his degree at either institution. While studying at Fuller Seminary, Bright felt what he regarded as the call of God to reach out to university students and abandoned his academic studies. Before starting his campus ministry, Bright sold off his confections company and settled a financial dispute with his former business partners, the Taylor family.

== Family ==
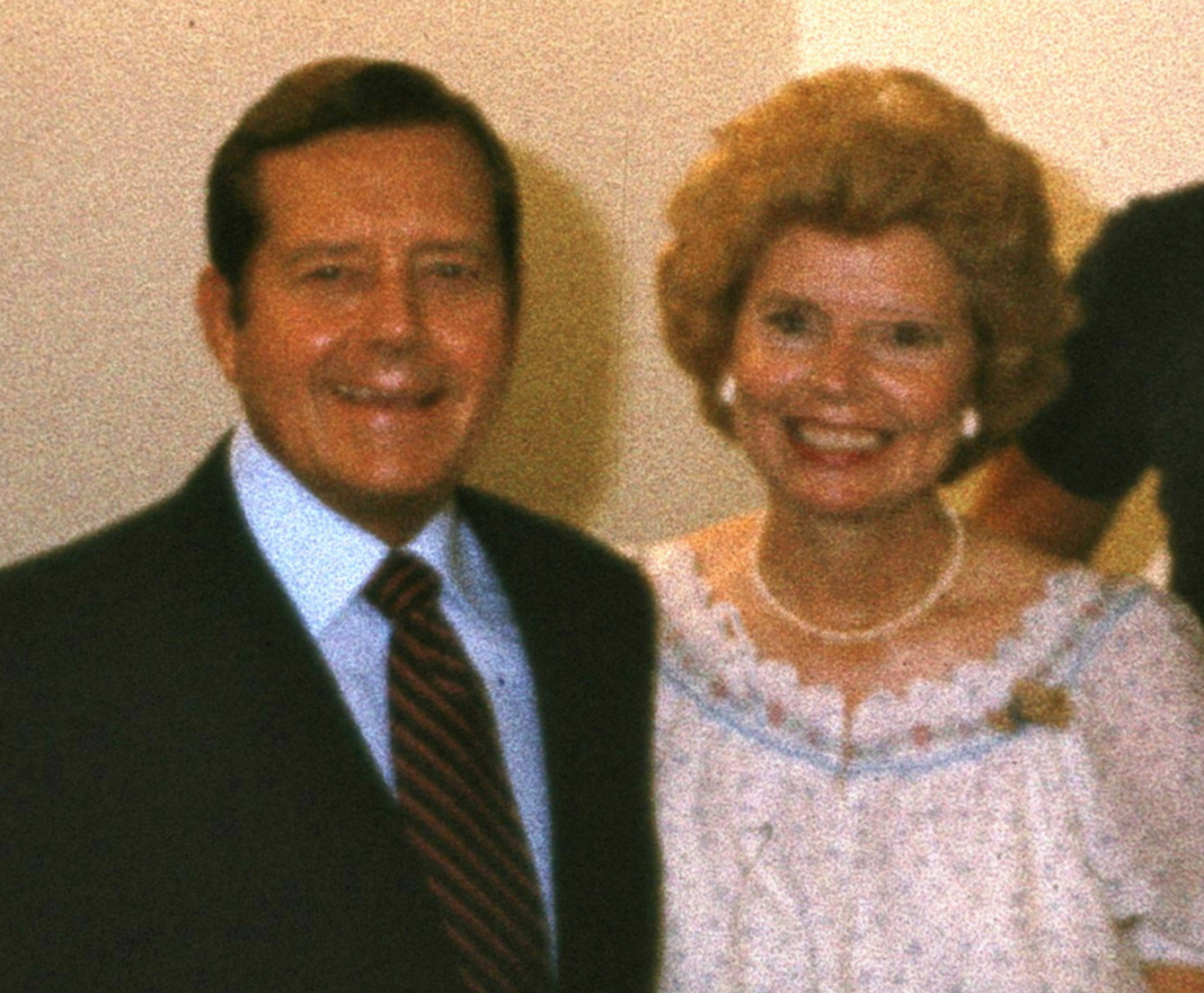
Bill Bright and his wife Vonette in Turku, Finland, in 1980

Bill Bright married Vonette Zachary on December 30, 1948. The two had been engaged to marry since the spring of 1946. However, Bill, at the prompting of Vonette's parents, agreed to delay the wedding until her impending 1948 graduation from Texas State College for Women. During the 1950s, the couple adopted two boys named Brad and Zachary Bright.

== Ministry career ==
=== Writings ===
In 1965, Bright wrote The Four Spiritual Laws, an evangelistic Christian tract. In the booklet he outlines his view of the essentials of the Christian faith concerning salvation. It is summarized as four spiritual laws or principles that govern what he sees as human beings' relationship with God. The booklet ends with a prayer of repentance.

=== Creation of Campus Crusade for Christ, early 1950s ===
Bright had initially planned to produce an evangelical film called The Great Adventure but abandoned the project due to a lack of funding.

Though Bright had initially considered partnering with other churches, his disenchantment with their ability to mentor new Christian converts led him to start Campus Crusade for Christ as a parachurch organization. In 1951, after recruiting several volunteers from Fuller Seminary and Hollywood Presbyterian, Bright started Campus Crusade's first chapter at the University of California, Los Angeles (UCLA). According to Turner, Campus Crusade was also inspired by Bright's desire to combat Communist influence in US universities including UCLA, which was then regarded as a hotbed of student radicalism.

By 1952, Bright's Campus Crusade had reportedly converted 250 students at UCLA including the student body president, campus newspaper editor, and several athletes including African American decathlete and future Olympian Rafer Johnson. While Bill and his colleagues focused on the male students, Vonette focused on reaching out to the female students.

In 1953, Campus Crusade established its headquarters in Los Angeles' Westwood Boulevard. Bright's campus outreach was also aided by his Hollywood Presbyterian mentor Henrietta Mears, who allowed the Brights to share her Bel Air home and spoke at several Crusade functions.

=== Expansion of Campus Crusade ===
Bright's success at UCLA led him to establish Campus Crusade branches at several other US universities.

Campus Crusade's expansion across several US campuses created friction with other Christian campus groups, including InterVarsity Christian Fellowship and liberal campus chaplains, who disagreed with the evangelistic tone of Bright's ministry. In 1956, Bright wrote a 20-minute evangelistic presentation called "God's Plan for Your Life", which set the tone for Campus Crusade's evangelism and discipleship program. Bright also initially partnered with the fundamentalist Bob Jones University. However, the relationship deteriorated after Bright sided with Billy Graham, who had accepted the sponsorship of liberal Protestants for his 1957 New York crusade. In response, Bob Jones Sr. and his son Bob Jones Jr. severed relations with Bright's ministry. According to Turner, this split with Bob Jones University led Bright to gravitate towards the "new evangelical" wing of the Protestant movement, which was associated with Billy Graham's cooperative evangelism.

In 2011, Campus Crusade for Christ had 25,000 missionaries in 191 countries.

== Later life ==
In 1974, Bright founded Third Century Publishers along with politician John Conlan; the company's goal was to link conservative economic and political views with evangelical Christianity. The founding of Third Century has been described as "the first major effort to build a national movement of conservative evangelicals". The early new Christian right movement has thus been referred to as the "Third Century movement" by author Sara Diamond. Major funders included Amway founder Richard DeVos and National Liberty Corporation's Arthur DeMoss. Bright and Conlan soon took over the struggling Christian Freedom Foundation (founded by J. Howard Pew and Howard Kershner), a non-profit which they used to receive donations for Third Century. The foundation was headed by Christian right pioneer Ed McAteer.

In 1975, along with fellow evangelist Loren Cunningham (founder of Youth With a Mission) and theologian Francis Schaeffer, Bright was one of the founders of what would later be termed the Seven Mountain Mandate. The idea would later go on to be popularized by Bethel Church pastor Bill Johnson and Lance Wallnau, among others. The concept centers around Christians taking dominion of seven societal spheres of influence: "family, religion, education, media, art, economics, and government."

In the mid-1970s, Bright started Christian Embassy with the aim of "[evangelizing] members of Congress, the military, the judiciary, and the diplomatic service."

The progressive evangelical magazine Sojourners covered the founding of Third Century and growing evangelical ties to politics—still taboo at the time—in a 1976 expose.

In the late 1970s, Bright planned to spread the gospel message to the whole world by 1980 through his "Here's Life, America!" campaign. "Here's Life" employed millions of Christians in local churches nationwide, along with large advertising campaigns.

In 1981, Bright held the Financial Success Seminar together with oil executive and major John Birch Society funder Nelson Bunker Hunt, promoting economic success through Bible-based methods, evangelism, and end-times prophecy.

In 1983, he chaired the National Committee for the National Year of the Bible. He was named the 1996 recipient of the $1.1 million Templeton Prize for Progress in Religion.

He wrote more than 100 books and booklets, and thousands of articles and pamphlets. He endorsed the document "Evangelicals and Catholics Together".

Bright was a co-founder of the Alliance Defense Fund, which funds high-profile litigation cases on behalf of Christians' First Amendment rights. He was a co-signatory of the Land letter of 2002, which outlined a just war rationale for the 2003 invasion of Iraq, providing a theological underpinning for the invasion being planned by President George W. Bush.

He produced the film Jesus in 1979, which was released by Warner Bros. in the United States. It was not a financial success, losing approximately $2 million.

In 1988, Bright led the protest against the Martin Scorsese film The Last Temptation of Christ and he called the film "blasphemous". He offered to buy the film's negative from Universal in order to destroy it.

Bright held five honorary doctorate degrees: a Doctor of Laws from the Jeonbuk National University of Korea, a Doctor of Divinity from John Brown University, a Doctor of Letters from Houghton Seminary, a Doctor of Divinity from the Los Angeles Bible College and Seminary, and a Doctor of Laws from Pepperdine University.

== Death ==
Bright died on July 19, 2003, in Orlando, Florida. His wife died in 2015.

== Politics ==
Bright's father, Dale Bright, was a staunch Republican who served as the chairman of the Wagoner County Republican Party. Like his father, Bill remained a staunch Republican supporter and voter throughout his life. One author describes Bright, saying, "Always careful to couch his activities as purely evangelistic, he nevertheless has been present at crucial junctures in Christian Right political history." As an evangelical Christian, Bright was also anti-Communist and stated that one of his reasons for starting Campus Crusade was to combat Communist influence in US universities. During the 1970s, Bright defended the South Korean President Park Chung Hee, who imposed martial law and assumed dictatorial powers. He claimed that Park was fighting against Communism and supported religious freedom, as well as that South Korea allowed more religion freedom than the United States. In 1977, TIME magazine wrote regarding Bright's political aims: "Even the tolerant Billy Graham publicly criticized Bright for trying to organize Evangelicals into a political bloc."
