= Frank Lennon =

Canadian photographer (1927–2006)

- Born: January 26, 1927; Toronto, Ontario, Canada
- Died: August 22, 2006 (aged 79); Toronto, Ontario, Canada
- Occupations: Photographer, journalist

Frank Lennon (January 26, 1927 – August 22, 2006) was a Canadian photographer and photojournalist. He was best known for taking the photograph of Paul Henderson celebrating Canada's win over the Soviet Union at the 1972 Summit Series.

== Early life ==
Lennon was born in Toronto, Ontario. He joined the staff of the Toronto Star in 1944, where he worked as a messenger boy. His involvement with paper precedes that, as his father and uncle both worked for the papers. He worked in several departments, eventually working as a wire photo receiver, where he became interested in photography.

== Career ==
Lennon worked as a freelance photographer for many years, and was one of the first photographers recruited by the Star after they decided to hire an in-house photographic staff. Lennon worked for the Star for 47 years, retiring in 1990. His photograph of Paul Henderson won him many awards, including the Canadian Press Picture of the Year and a National Newspaper Award. The photograph has appeared in countless books, and was used as the design for a Royal Canadian Mint coin and a postage stamp.

== Death ==
Lennon died at 79 in Toronto.
