= Student Venture =

Student Venture is an interdenominational Christian organization affiliated with Campus Crusade for Christ that promotes evangelism and discipleship on junior and senior high school campuses.

== Activities ==
Student Venture activities include student meetings, discussion groups, 1-on-1 counseling, leadership training, conferences, retreats and summer mission trip opportunities.

In 1994, the New York Times reported that Student Venture had helped organize junior high and high school students into prayer groups with over 177,000 participants.

== Court rulings ==
In the 1980s, Student Venture was denied permission to rent meeting space from a high school in the Centenniel School District in Pennsylvania. A lawsuit was subsequently filed by Student Venture's parent organization, Campus Crusade for Christ, which was eventually heard by the United States Court of Appeals for the Third Circuit. In Gregoire v. Centennial School District (1990), the Court ruled in favor of Student Venture, claiming denial of facilities for religious organizations created a "limited open forum".
