= Arrowhead Line =

Arrowhead
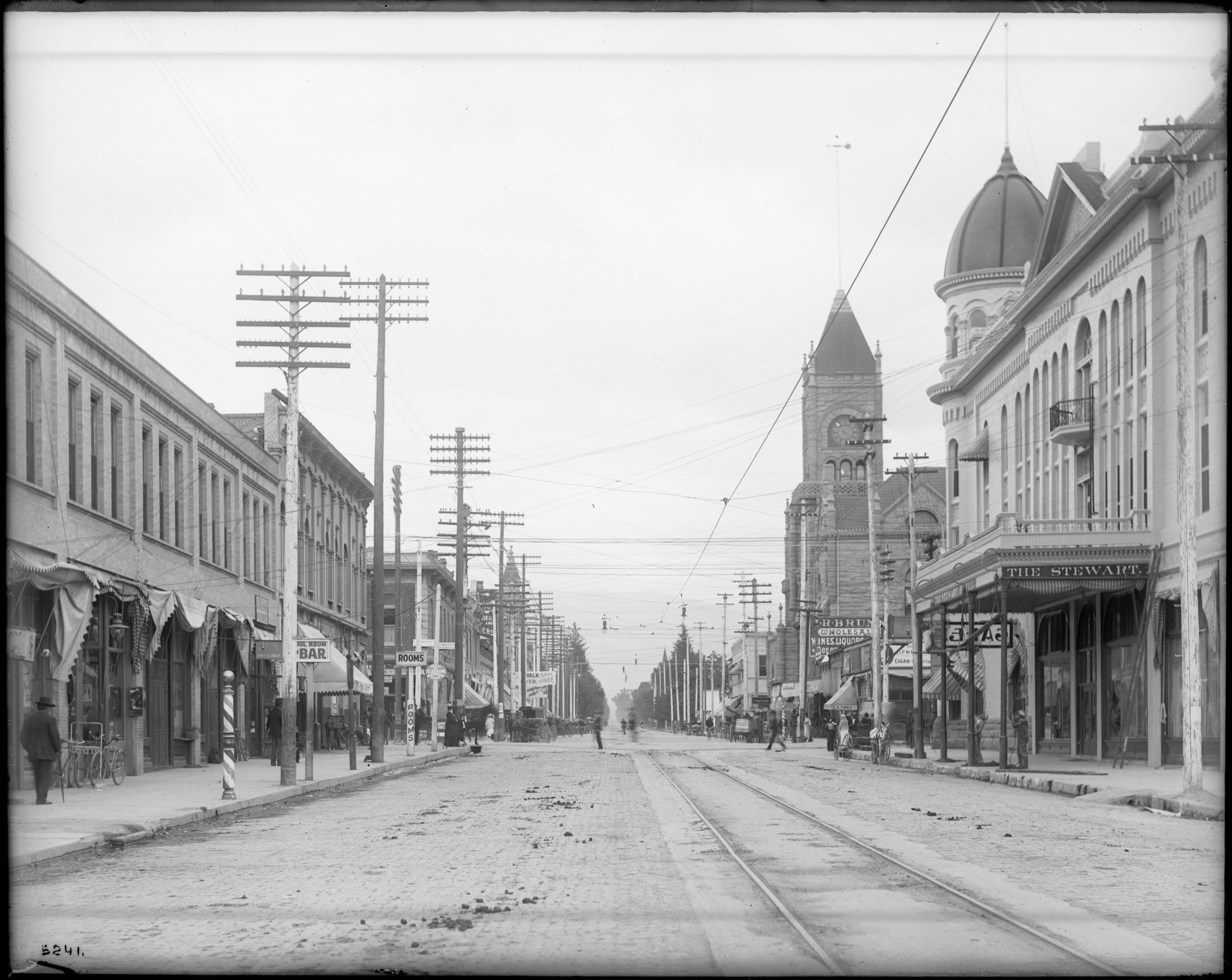
- Tracks at E Street and 3rd Street in San Bernardino, adjacent the Stewart Hotel, 1905

Overview
- Status: Defunct
- Owner: Pacific Electric
- Locale: San Bernardino, California
- Termini: San Bernardino; Arrowhead Springs

Service
- Type: Interurban
- System: Pacific Electric
- Operator(s): Pacific Electric

History
- Opened: February 22, 1902
- Closed: August 31, 1932

Technical
- Number of tracks: 1–2
- Track gauge: 1,435 mm (4 ft 8 1/2 in) standard gauge
- Old gauge: 3 ft 6 in (1,067 mm)
- Electrification: Overhead line, 600 V DC

The Arrowhead Line was a suburban route of the Pacific Electric Railway. It ran from the joint Pacific Electric and Southern Pacific San Bernardino Depot to Arrowhead Springs, by way of D Street.

== History ==
Constructed by the San Bernardino, Arrowhead & Waterman Railway, the line was sold to the Pacific Electric in 1904. An extension to the Arrowhead Hotel began carrying cars in March 1907. Operations along the line ceased on July 7, 1924 amid power problems in Pacific Electric system; limited service was restored the following January with the rest of the line brought back to full schedule by March 25, 1925. The Arrowhead Line saw sparse passenger service beyond the local lines in San Bernardino, with many trips north of Highland Avenue operated as a shuttle service. Regular passenger operations initially ended after August 1932, though Excursion trips continued until June 1941. Local service was reestablished as far north as Mountain View and 34th as part of the D Street–Highland Avenue Local between 1937 and 1942, when the franchise expired.

Freight operations continued with diesel locomotives after 1942.

== Freight ==
The Arrowhead Line primarily served to haul water tanks from the Arrowhead Springs Company.
