= Power to Change Ministries =

- Formation: 1967; 59 years ago
- Founder: Josh McDowell
- Founded at: Vancouver, British Columbia, Canada
- Headquarters: Abbotsford, British Columbia, Canada
- President: Darren Young
- Chairman: Don Van Meer
- Affiliations: Cru
- Staff: Approx. 600
- Website: p2c.com
- Formerly called: Campus Crusade for Christ Canada

Power to Change Ministries is the Canadian ministry of Cru, an interdenominational evangelical organization that was founded in 1951 in the United States. Power to Change is one of the larger Christian ministries in Canada, with approximately 600 employees.

Power to Change is currently headquartered in Abbotsford, British Columbia, and carries on a number of ministries including ministries for students in universities, sports, internet, families, leaders, street drama, church planting, humanitarian aid, marginalized peoples, women, and prayer.

Power to Change was adopted as the name of the Cru ministry in Australia in 2016.

== History ==
Power to Change was founded in 1967 by Josh McDowell as Campus Crusade for Christ Canada. The initial organization was based around a student ministry at the University of British Columbia in Vancouver. Athletes in Action was launched in Canada in 1974 and the Christian Embassy was started in Ottawa in 1985. FamilyLife hosted its first marriage conference in Canada in 1988.

In 2007, Campus Crusade for Christ Canada changed its name to Power to Change Ministries. Power to Change is currently led by Darren Young.
