= Parachurch organization =

Christian faith-based group

Parachurch organizations are Christian faith-based organizations that work outside and across denominations to engage in social welfare and evangelism. Parachurch organizations seek to come alongside the church and specialize in things that individual churches may not be able to specialize in by themselves. They often cross denominational and national boundaries providing specialized services and training.

== Definition ==
These bodies can be businesses, non-profit corporations, or private associations. Most parachurch organizations, at least those normally called parachurch, are Protestant or Evangelical. Some of these organizations cater to a defined spectrum among evangelical beliefs, but most are self-consciously interdenominational and many are ecumenical.

In Protestant and Catholic theology parachurch organizations are termed sodality, as distinct from modality, which is the structure and organization of the local or universal church.

== Roles and organizations ==
Parachurch organizations perform a number of roles, including:

- evangelistic crusade associations (patterned after the Billy Graham Association)
- evangelistic and discipleship ministries (such as ThereforeGo Ministries, Youth With a Mission (YWAM), InterVarsity Christian Fellowship, Scripture Union, Cru, Fellowship of Christian Athletes, Christian Challenge,The Navigators, and Asian American Christian Fellowship)
- music and print publishers, radio and television stations, film studios, online ministries
- study centers and institutes, schools, colleges and universities
- political and social activist groups
- welfare and social services, including homeless shelters, child care, and domestic violence, disaster relief programs, and food pantries and clothing closets, and emergency aid centers (such as the City Missions)
- self-help groups
- Bible study groups

== Evangelical parachurch growth ==
Evangelical parachurch organizations proliferated as a byproduct of the fundamentalist–modernist controversy. As modernist views penetrated mainline churches, those with more fundamentalist views who elected to stay reached across denominational boundaries for opportunities for Christian fellowship and outreach. While most parachurch organizations involved in social work operated in a collaborative mode, those engaged in evangelistic and discipleship ministries, particularly on college campuses, have at times been in fierce competition. Seeking to resolve such issues, Campus Crusade for Christ, InterVarsity Christian Fellowship, the Navigators, and Young Life signed the "Trail West Agreement", pledging mutual respect. The agreement was renewed in 2010 with thirteen additional signers as the "Chicago Agreement".

== See also ==
- Evangelicalism
- List of Protestant missionary societies
