= Arrowhead Springs, San Bernardino =

Arrowhead Springs
- Neighborhood
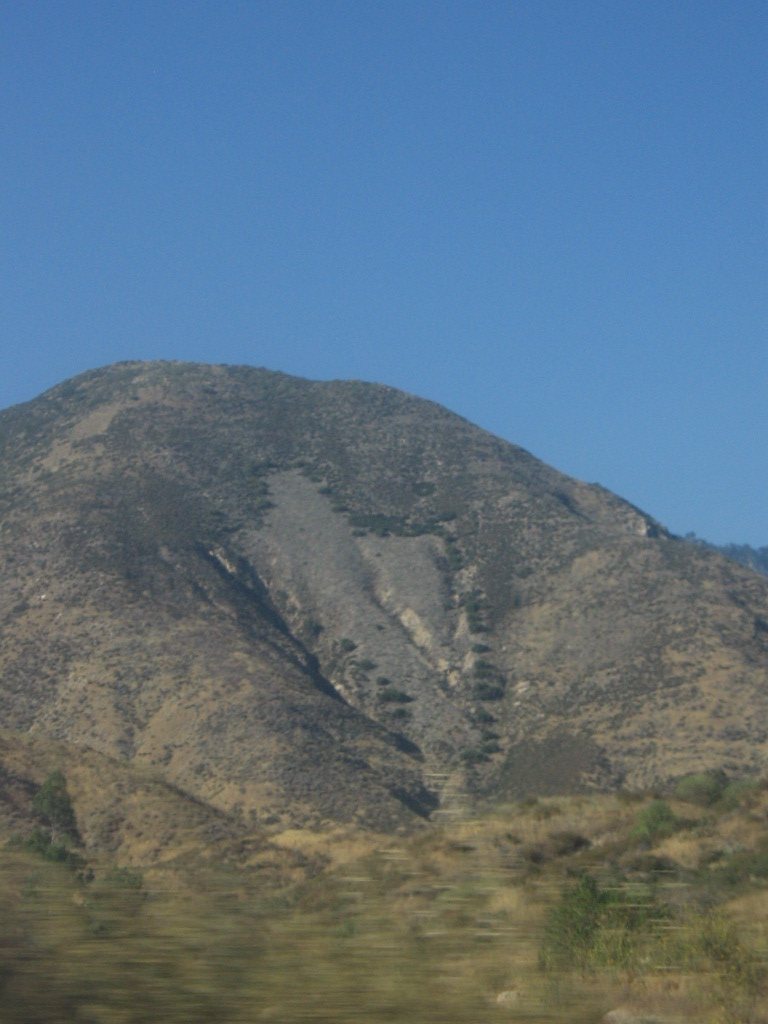
- The Arrowhead geological monument
- Nicknames: The Arrow; A-Hood; The Springs; A.S.
- Interactive map of Arrowhead Springs
- Coordinates: 34°11′12″N 117°15′42″W
- Country: United States
- State: California
- City: San Bernardino
- Elevation: 2,059–3,000 ft (628–914 m)

Population (2000)
- Time zone: UTC-8 (PST)
  - Summer (DST): UTC-7 (PDT)

California Historical Landmark
- Official name: The Arrowhead
- Reference no.: 977

Arrowhead Springs is a highly mountainous neighborhood in the 81-square-mile (210 km^{2}) municipality of San Bernardino, California, officially annexed to the city on November 19, 2009.

== The Arrowhead Landmark ==
The neighborhood lies below the Arrowhead geological monument, which is California Historical Landmark #977.

This possibly indigenously carved Geoglyph on a geologic formation of light quartz on the side of Arrowhead Peak. It presides over San Bernardino and the rest of the San Bernardino Valley. The city of Lake Arrowhead, California and the adjacent lake, Lake Arrowhead Reservoir, take their names from the formation as does Arrowhead Water. The Native Americans of the San Bernardino Valley thought the Arrowhead pointed to the artesian hot springs below, which are the site of the historic Arrowhead Springs Hotel, Spa, & Bungalows. The region is also home to the Arrowhead Country Club and Golf Course.

The Arrowhead landmark itself is at 34°11′39″N 117°15′35″W.

In a 2007 report in The California Geographer, however, California State University, San Bernardino geography professor Norman Meek noted that the first direct record of the feature appeared in an 1864 photograph taken shortly after the establishment of the health resort by David Noble Smith at the hot springs. No mention of the arrowhead appears in any records of Spanish travelers in the area in the 18th or early 19th centuries, nor in records of Mormon settlement in the area in the 1850s, nor in the first scientific geological survey conducted in the area of the feature in 1853. Meek conducted analysis of soil samples, finding no significant difference in substrate composition of arrowhead itself compared to its surroundings aside from increased traces of fire retardant chemicals used for wildfire control, casting doubt on the hypothesis that the feature could be explained as a purely natural formation. Based on this, and the sudden increase in reports and purported legends of the arrowhead in late 19th century reporting and advertising for the resort, Meek contended that "the arrowhead may be a human-made advertisement created sometime in the late 1850s or early 1860s, perhaps by the founder of the hot springs resort". He suggested that the feature may have been constructed with the help of local native tribespeople, possibly modifying a landslide scar.

== Arrowhead Springs Hotel and Spa ==
The historic Arrowhead Springs Hotel and Spa, located in the Arrowhead Springs neighborhood, encompasses 1,916 acres (7.75 km^{2}) directly beneath the Arrowhead geological monument that presides over the San Bernardino Valley. The present building was designed by architects Gordon B. Kaufmann and Paul R. Williams. The resort contains hot springs, in addition to mineral baths and steam caves located deep underground. It featured a Pacific Electric "Red Car" rail line connecting the hotel to San Bernardino and the Greater Los Angeles area. Long the headquarters for Campus Crusade for Christ, the site remained largely vacant and unused since their operations moved to Florida. In May 2016, the San Manuel Band of Mission Indians purchased the Arrowhead Springs property.

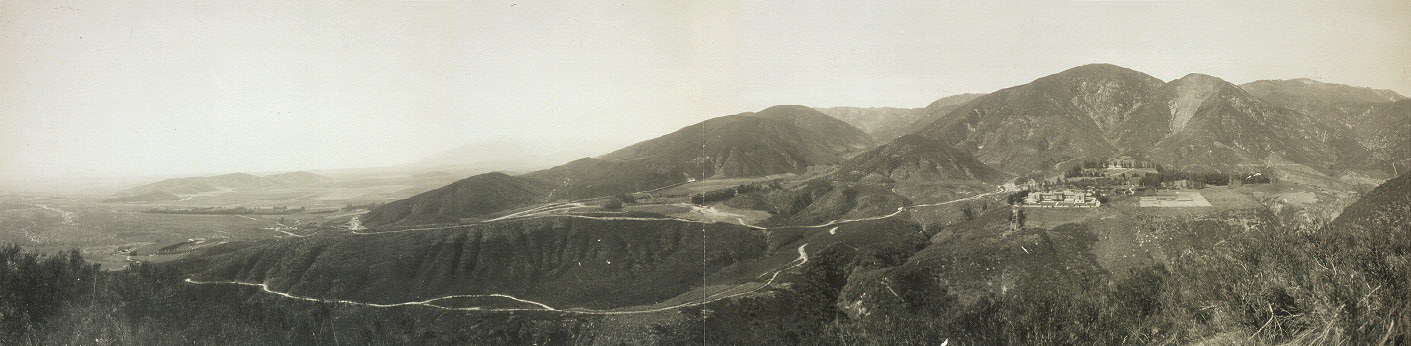
Panorama of the Arrowhead Springs site showing the Arrowhead Hot Springs Hotel, 1908.

In 1924, architect Arthur B. Benton, designed a rustic concrete entrance archway encased in ornamental boulders. The archway stood 15 feet high with a 26-foot span. It appears the arch location was at 34°10′58″N 117°16′26″W.

== Future ==
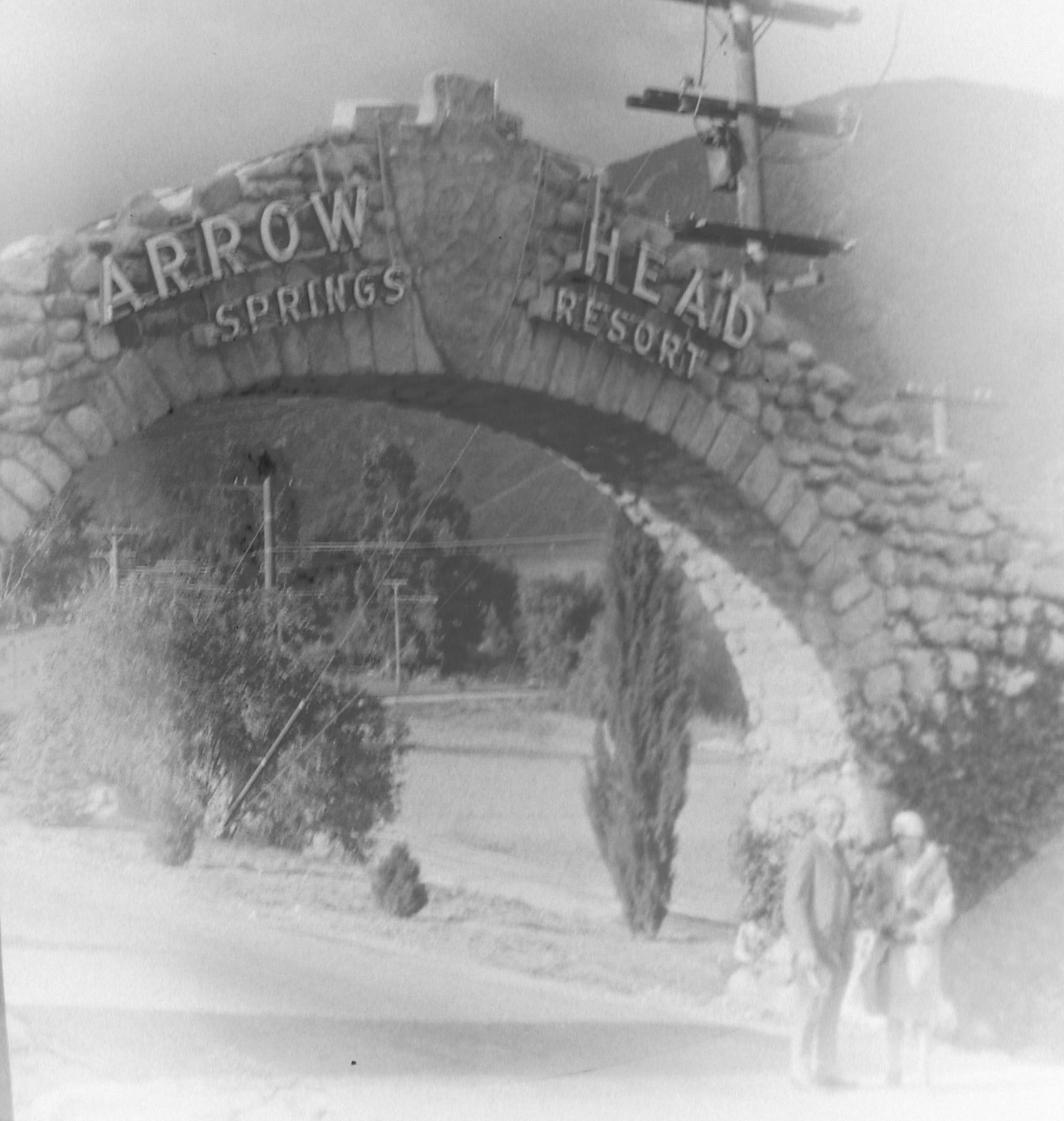
Arrowhead Springs Resort Archway. circa 1929

The specific plan for the future of the site includes: a new 115-room annex to the existing 135-room hotel; a new 300-room lakefront hotel; new reservoirs and a reconfiguration of the 5-acre (20,000 m^{2}) Lake Vonette; new vineyards, along with the Windy Point restaurant and wine-tasting site; a new 18-hole golf course; 36 new custom estates on fairway-adjacent lots; 200,000 square feet (19,000 m^{2}) of commercial space, 34 apartment suites built to condominium standards, and 266 condominiums, townhomes, and single-family attached homes in the new Village Walk mixed-use lifestyle center; 300 new condominiums, townhomes, and/or senior apartments in an upscale retirement village; a new 8,600-square-foot (800 m^{2}) spa resort; 429 condominiums, townhomes, and single-family detached homes located adjacent to the golf course; commercial stables at a new polo club and equestrian center; extensive multi-purpose trails and watercourses; a 13.9-acre (56,000 m^{2}) public botanical garden; 7.1 acres (29,000 m^{2}) of private parks; a new 250,000-square-foot (23,000 m^{2}) office complex; a new 25,000-square-foot (2,300 m^{2}) conference center; and, 8,000 square feet (740 m^{2}) of commercial space and 285 condominiums, townhomes, and single-family attached homes in the Hilltown development. Existing facilities on the grounds include: a cinema; ten private bungalows previously owned by such people as Eleanor Roosevelt, Lucille Ball, the Marx Brothers, Judy Garland, Elizabeth Taylor, and Humphrey Bogart; an outdoor amphitheater; a wedding chapel; the Esther Williams Pool and Cabanas; the Hill Auditorium; several ballrooms; a guard house; tennis courts; and the Hacienda.

== See also ==
- List of California Historical Landmarks
- California Historical Landmarks in San Bernardino County
