= Strawberry Creek (San Bernardino County, California) =

Stream near San Bernardino, California, US

Location
- Country: United States
- State: California
- Region: San Bernardino County
- Cities: Rimforest, California, San Bernardino, California

Physical characteristics
- Source: Southwest slope of Strawberry Peak
  - location: San Bernardino Mountains
  - coordinates: 34°13′38″N 117°13′30″W
  - elevation: 5,000 ft (1,500 m)
- Mouth: Confluence with East Twin Creek
  - coordinates: 34°11′11″N 117°15′20″W
  - elevation: 1,873 ft (571 m)

Basin features
- Tributaries
  - right: Coldwater Canyon

Strawberry Creek is a 4-mile-long (6.4 km) stream on the south flank of the San Bernardino Mountains above the city of San Bernardino. It is part of the Warm Creek watershed in San Bernardino, California whose waters flow to the Santa Ana River. Wells under an expired (1988) special use permit from the U.S. Forest Service to Nestlé Waters North America tap into groundwater above Strawberry Creek on the San Bernardino National Forest and bottle it for sale as Arrowhead Mountain Spring Water.

== History and controversy ==
Nestle's Strawberry Creek wells lie northeast of an arrowhead-shaped rock formation for which its commercial bottled water is named. Nestle's permit to withdraw water and transfer it across the national forest expired in 1988 although it continues to draw an average of over 62.5 million gallons each year from the groundwater. The U. S. Forest Service is required to and has agreed to conduct an environmental impact review before re-issuing Nestle's water use permit. The National Forest may authorize a permit if it can be shown that the water extraction and transport will not result in a significant adverse effect on the National Forest and the water is in excess to that needed to protect and manage the National Forest.

A major controversy has risen in the last 3–4 years regarding water removal and the effects on the stream and its resources. The most severe drought in the area in hundreds of years brought this issue to a head. The wells and the stream are found on the San Bernardino National Forest which is public land owned by all citizens. Nestle, a foreign corporation, claims that they own the water based on claims dating back to 1865, and that the Forest Service has no authority to regulate the take of water. Citizens and environmental groups argue that the State of California owns and regulates the water of the State and that for groundwater, the overlying landowner (Forest Service) has the right to determine the use of groundwater under the National Forest. Citizens also point to the Public Trust Doctrine that the State considers in making their decision on water rights disputes. Another issue is calling the water spring water, naturally coming to the surface as Nestle claims, when citizens believe it is actually groundwater from wells that extend 120–495 feet into the mountain. In April 2021 the California Department of Water Resources drafted a cease-and-desist order claiming that Nestlé was taking 25 times more than its share. In 2020, the company drew out about 58 million gallons, far surpassing the 2.3 million gallons per year it could validly claim.

== Watershed and course ==
Strawberry Creek arises at 5,000 feet (1,500 m) just south of Rimforest in the San Bernardino Mountains, and southeast of Strawberry Peak. It flows south for 2.5 miles (4.0 km) then 1.5 miles (2.4 km) southwest until it joins East Twin Creek. East Twin Creek is joined by West Twin Creek, the latter draining Waterman Canyon. East Twin Creek is a tributary to Warm Creek which is, in turn, a tributary to the Santa Ana River, and eventually to the Pacific Ocean.

== Habitat and ecology ==
The Santa Ana speckled dace (Rhinichthys osculus ssp.) used Strawberry Creek until the combination of low flows in the 2003 summer drought and the wildfire and floods in November/December 2003 apparently wiped out the fish. The Santa Ana speckled dace are very rare and threatened by human activities such as water withdrawal, barriers to movement and isolation. The habitat supports many threatened, endangered, and Forest Service Sensitive species. The list includes, least Bell's vireo, southwestern willow flycatcher, two-striped garter snake, California spotted owl, and the southern rubber boa. Plans are being made to reintroduce the Santa Ana speckled dace and mountain yellow legged frog when water conditions are appropriate. The prolonged drought has had a significant effect on streams in southern California and their ability to support animal species that require surface water.

== See also ==
- San Bernardino National Forest
- Santa Ana River
- California Department of Fish and Wildlife
