= The Total Woman =

Non-fiction book

- First edition
- Author: Marabel Morgan
- Language: English
- Subject: Marriage
- Genre: Self-help
- Publisher: Revell
- Publication date: 1973
- Publication place: United States
- Media type: Print (hardback and paperback)
- Pages: 336

The Total Woman is a self-help book for married women by Marabel Morgan published in 1973. The book sold over 500,000 copies within the first year, making it the most successful non-fiction book in the U.S. in 1974. Overall, it sold more than ten million copies. Grounded in evangelical Christianity, it taught that "A Total Woman caters to her man's special quirks, whether it be in salads, sex, or sports," and is perhaps best remembered for instructing wives to greet their man at the front door wearing sexy outfits; suggestions included "a cowgirl or a showgirl." "It's only when a woman surrenders her life to her husband, reveres and worships him and is willing to serve him, that she becomes really beautiful to him," Morgan wrote.

== Inspiration and development ==
In 1970, Morgan founded Total Woman, Inc., a company that was concerned with marketing this idea. From then on, she gave seminars for Christian-oriented married women about how they should conduct themselves in deference towards their husbands. The seminars consisted of four two-hour sessions for $15. After several years, she had trained more than 100 instructors, who gave further courses in 28 states and Canada. By 1975, there were over 15,000 graduates, including singer Anita Bryant, the wives of Jack Nicklaus and Joe Frazier, and 12 wives of players on the Miami Dolphins football team.

Morgan wrote her four basic ideas – ignoring the mistakes of the husband and focusing on his virtues, admiring him physically, appreciating him, and adapting to the idea that the husband was the king and his wife was the queen – down in a book, The Total Woman. It was published in December 1973 by the small publishing house Fleming H. Revell Company, a subsidiary of the evangelically-oriented Baker Publishing Group. The first printing was 5,000 copies. The book sold over 500,000 copies within the first year, making it the best-selling non-fiction book in the U.S. in 1974. The paperback rights were sold for over $600,000.

== In popular culture ==
This book and its ideas were mentioned and satirized in the 1977 Maude episode "Feminine Fulfillment" (season 5, episode 19).

The book was also satirized on Saturday Night Live, season 3, episode 7 (Dec. 10, 1977), hosted by Mary Kay Place.

The book and its ideas are mentioned in the 1988 'Cheers episode "Those lips, Those eyes" (season 7, episode 5).
