= Vonette Bright =

American author, speaker, and co-founder of Cru

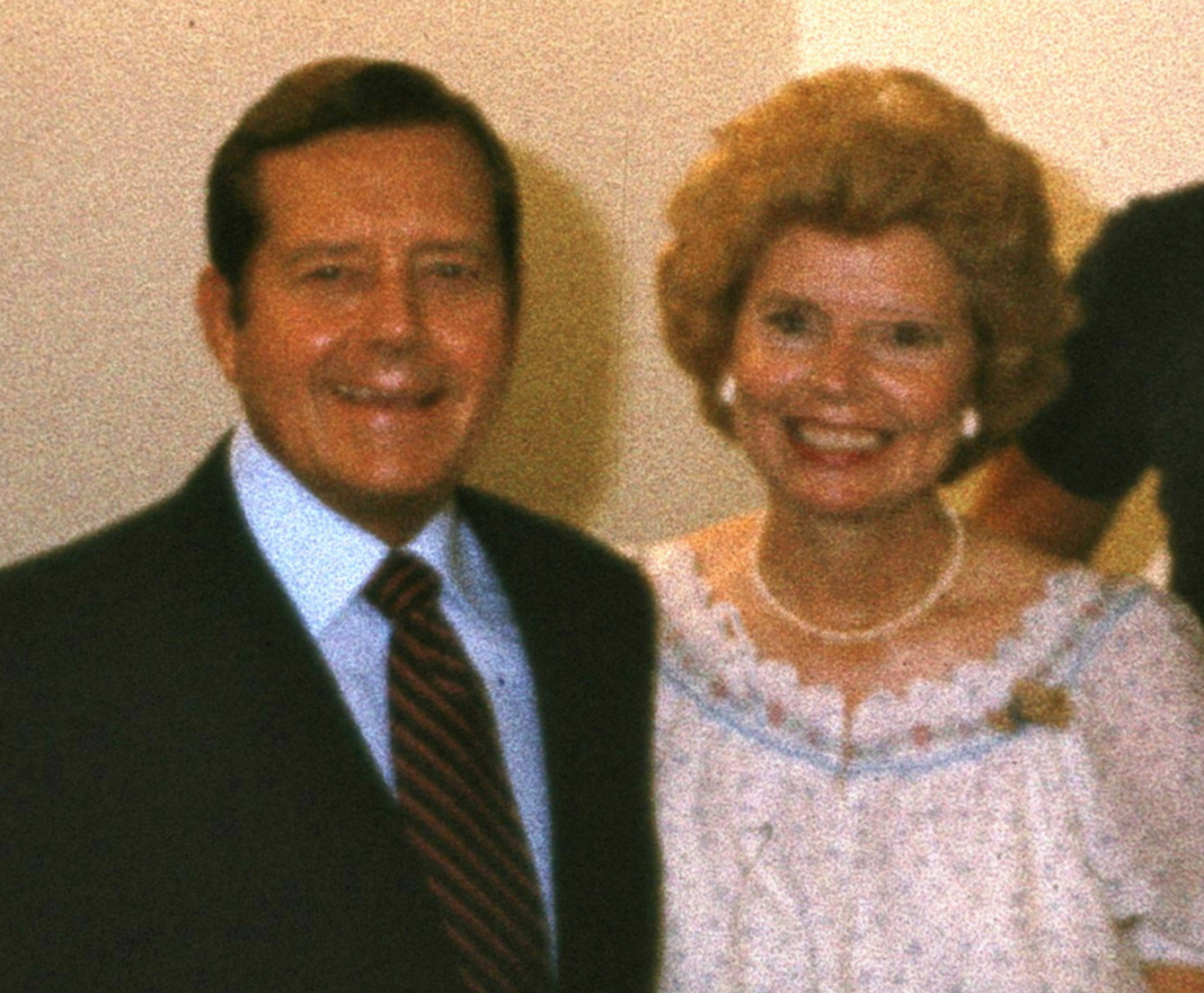
Bill and Vonette Bright in Turku, Finland, in 1980

Vonette Zachary Bright (July 2, 1926 – December 23, 2015) was an American author, speaker, and the co-founder of Cru.

Bright was born in Coweta, Oklahoma, and graduated with a B. A. degree in Home Economics and a minor in Chemistry from Texas Women's University in 1948. That summer she attended a conference with her fiancé Bill Bright at Forest Home Christian Conference Center, where she prayed to receive Christ under the spiritual direction of Henrietta Mears. That same year, she and Bill were married on December 30, 1948. In 1951, the couple moved into the Bel-Air home of Mears and from there launched Campus Crusade for Christ until their move to their new headquarters at Arrowhead Springs ten years later.

Bright was known for her prayer rallies, her work as the chair of the National Day of Prayer task force that helped establish a fixed day for the event under Ronald Reagan, and as a chairperson (and one of the three women on the committee) on the Lausanne Committee for World Evangelization. She was also the author or co-author of more than 20 books, including, In His Hands, Passion for Prayer, and the "Sister Circle" Series. Bright adopted a less provocative stance on social issues than her husband, but was outgoing and articulate and often spoke at conferences.

After Bill's death in 2003, Vonette continued her ministry work until her death in 2015. She died aged 89.
