= Modality (theology) =

Modality, in Protestant and Catholic Christian theology, is the structure and organization of the local or universal church. In Catholic theology, the modality is the universal Catholic church. In Protestant theology, the modality is variously described as either the universal church (that is, all believers) or the local church.

By contrast, parachurch organizations are sodalities. These include missionary organizations and Christian charities not linked to specific churches. Some theologians consider denominations, schools of theology, and other multi-congregational sodalities. Catholic sodalities include orders, monasteries and convents.

== Definition ==
Modality is one of the two basic structures through which God's redemptive purpose is carried out in history; it is how Christianity moves through missions across the world. According to Ralph D. Winter, it is defined as a structured fellowship that includes people of 'all ages and both sexes', typically organized around normal biological family units. Coined by Winter, the idea of the term has trickled down the history of christianity tradition which through Paul's Missionary travels borrowed and established Jewish synagogue-type fellowships allowing cultural assimilation of non Jewish traditions.

== Historic forms of modality ==
The New Testament Synagogue: This is the original prototype for the christian church structure. It was built and formed in similar fashion as Jewish temples (Congregational and independent) and embraced the entire community of believers; Men, Women, and Children in a specific location.

The Roman Diocese: As christianity adapted to the roman empire, the independent/congregational synagogue pattern was largely replaced by the diocese. This structure mirrored Roman civil government patterns, with a bishop exercising authority over a specific territorial jurisdiction which would have many synagogues.

The Parish: It is the local level division of the diocese's territorial structure.

== Contemporary forms ==
The Local Congregation: This is the primary modern form of modality. it functions as a pastoral structure designed to nurture its members, avoid risks, and bring the fellowship to spiritual maturity. Denomination: These are arguably considered as modalities because they usually represent congregants who deliberately choose to be part of the community without undergoing specialized missionary recruitment from sodalities.

== How modalities form ==
Conglomerate Church: A modality that is formed from gathering up people from several different areas of society (class, tribe, culture, orphaned, abused etc). These group of people are developed into a church community as the members may come first and then, a physical church building is built. Indigenous Church: A Modality that is characterized by enculturation. It is when a group finds within their church community, a society and transfers their cultural patterns into the society avoiding external influences.

== Relevance of modality ==
In his book Perspectives on the World Christian Movement: A Reader, Ralph D. Winter argues the relevance of modality as he discusses that modality and Sodality are the two structures that God uses throughout history to expand the church. While sodality refers to the structure of a specialized missionary group (characterized either by gender or age) which engages in pious practices and charitable works for a Christian goal (potentially developing essential strategies for growth). Modality on the other hand is the pastoral structure of a local church or denomination; meaning it ensures the continuity of the faith across generations. Modality, like local congregations or parishes include people of all ages and both sexes, organized like biological families, allowing the christian movement to be what Winter calls "Biologically Perpetuating Organism"; a community that is growing naturally providing the broad broad social fabric necessary for the survival and spiritual maturity of the body of believers.

The New Testament Synagogue serves as a prototype for all subsequent Christian fellowships. The place for worship is an essential part of many religious groups and Christianity is no exception. Right from the old testament 'Temple' to New Testament Synagogues, the physical place of worship has always been a necessity. The physical place of worship also has a community of people represent the faithful. Serving as the inclusive, visible congregational life that supports and stabilizes the broader christian population. Though, congregational worship or the structure of modality is arguably declining in Western nations, they remain the essential platform for the work and scholarship of the church.

== The modality versus sodality parachurch dispute ==
In some Christian circles, particularly among non-denominational evangelicals, there is conflict over whether parachurch, including Christian not-for-profit organizations are a biblical model for ministry. A minority of pastors and theologians assert that only the modality is a valid model for ministry, and they typically equate modality with the local church structure. Central to the dispute is whether the missionary travels of Paul the Apostle should be categorized as an expression of modality or sodality.

A practical consideration in the modality/sodality dispute is that certain Christian efforts, like translating the Bible into different languages, are difficult to organize and fund solely by local congregations in the absence of parachurch organizations. Ralph D. Winter of the US Center for World Mission has argued that modes of modality and sodality are both necessary and will be most effective if they are supportive of one another.
