= Christian Embassy =

Evangelical Christian organization

The Christian Embassy is an evangelical organization affiliated with Cru, formerly known as Campus Crusade for Christ. Like its parent organization, Christian Embassy describes itself as non-political and interdenominational.

== Overview ==
The Christian Embassy was started in 1975 by Bill Bright, founder of Cru, and then-congressman for Arizona John Conlan, in order to serve as a spiritual resource to leaders working in Congress, the Executive Branch, and the diplomatic community.

The Christian Embassy runs a number of offices in cities around the world, including Washington, D.C., London, New York City, Ottawa, Geneva, Dublin, Manila and Pretoria.

== Timeline ==
- 1975 - Founded in Washington D.C.
- 1980 - Opened United Nations office
- 1984 - Canadian ministry launched in Ottawa
- 1985 - First annual International Prayer Breakfast on the Opening Day of the United Nations General Assembly.
- 1990 - UN office officially accredited as a Non-Governmental Organization (NGO).

== Pentagon promotional video controversy ==
In 2004, Christian Embassy filmed a promotional video featuring endorsements by six Congressmen, two ambassadors, two ambassadors' wives, the Under Secretary for Benefits of the Department of Veterans Affairs, and the Administrator of the Environmental Protection Agency. It also included two civilian employees of the Department of Defense, and seven military officers, the latter filmed in uniform at the Pentagon and identified by name and rank. After the video was posted on the Christian Embassy's website in November, 2006, the Military Religious Freedom Foundation, a group led by retired Air Force lawyer Michael Weinstein, requested an investigation in a letter to the Department's Inspector General.

In July, 2007, the Inspector General issued a report on "Alleged Misconduct by DoD Officials Concerning Christian Embassy". The report concluded that some of the individuals filmed in the video did not violate any policies, but that others had violated DoD policy by endorsing the Christian Embassy while in uniform. Furthermore, Chaplain (Colonel) Ralph G. Benson had provided a "selective benefit" to Christian Embassy by obtaining permission for them to film the promotional video in the Pentagon, and that he had done so by "mischaracterizing the purpose and proponent of the video." Six senior officers (four generals and two colonels) were described in the report as having "improperly endorsed and participated with a non-Federal entity while in uniform." The report also noted that "their remarks conferred approval of and support to Christian Embassy, and the remarks of some officers implied they spoke for a group of senior military leaders rather than just for themselves." One of the generals stated that he thought that Christian Embassy was a "quasi-federal entity".

Participating Army generals were Robert L. Caslen Jr., Vincent K Brooks and Air Force generals Peter U. Sutton and Jack J. Catton Jr.
