= Arrowhead Water =

American bottled water brand

Arrowhead
- Country: United States
- Market: Western United States
- Produced by: BlueTriton Brands
- Introduced: 1894; 132 years ago
- Source: San Bernardino Mountains, California
- Type: still
- pH: 6.33-8.2
- Calcium (Ca): 20.4
- Chloride (Cl): 13.2
- Bicarbonate (HCO_{3}): 81.1
- Fluoride (F): 0.1
- Magnesium (Mg): 3.6
- Potassium (K): 1.5
- Sodium (Na): 11.1
- Sulfate (SO_{4}): 3.8
- TDS: 129
- Website: www.arrowheadwater.com
- All concentrations in milligrams per liter (mg/L); pH without units

Arrowhead Water, also known as Arrowhead Mountain Spring Water, is an American brand of drinking water that is sold in the Western United States, particularly in Idaho, Nevada, Arizona, Utah, Colorado, New Mexico, Washington, and California. It is bottled from 13 springs throughout the Western United States.

== Discovery ==
Arrowhead Mountain Spring Water takes its name from a natural mark in the San Bernardino Mountains that is shaped like a giant arrowhead. The arrowhead is naturally barren; it is not manicured in any way. Nearby cold springs on Strawberry Creek in the San Bernardino National Forest are the original source and namesake of Arrowhead water.

The first documented reference by Europeans to Arrowhead springs (Agua Caliente) was in records of priests stationed at Mission San Gabriel Arcángel, around 1820. David Noble Smith was the founder of the first sanitarium facilities at Arrowhead Springs in 1863, which were used to treat patients with tuberculosis and numerous other ailments. By the 1880s, the Arrowhead waters were famous for their supposed curing powers. By the early 20th century, the hot springs were a popular resort for tourism and vacationing.

== History ==
In 1909, the Arrowhead Springs Company was formed and the company's water products were marketed in Southern California. The water was transported from Arrowhead Springs, north of San Bernardino, California, to Los Angeles in glass-lined railroad tank cars. In 1917, the bottling operations moved to a new plant in Los Angeles. In 1929, the Arrowhead Springs Company merged with the company that marketed Puritas water, and began co-marketing the Puritas products with Arrowhead water. Puritas water products were first introduced in Los Angeles in 1894.

The Arrowhead and Puritas brands were bottled in the same plants and co-marketed until the 1970s. Arrowhead Springs marketed the brands in separate containers that sometimes carried the Arrowhead or Puritas names alone, but containers were often labeled "Arrowhead and Puritas." The Arrowhead Beverage Company was the bottler for many different brands of water and soft drinks including seltzer, fruit-flavored soda, and ginger ale.

In 1932, another important development for the company happened in the Los Angeles area, as it was named the official water refreshment of that year's Olympic Games, held at the City of the Stars. Arrowhead water returned to the Olympic Games again in 1984, when the games were again held in Los Angeles. In 1993, Arrowhead water bought the naming rights for the Arrowhead Pond in Anaheim.

1.5 Liter Bottle of Arrowhead. The bottle is similar to fellow Nestlé brands Deer Park, Poland Spring, and Nestlé Pure Life.

=== The Nestlé era ===
In 1987, Arrowhead waters was bought by Nestlé. Soon after, the presence of Arrowhead water bottles in supermarkets across the Western United States grew considerably.

In 1996, a 24-US-fluid-ounce (710 ml) bottle was introduced by the company. By the early 2000s, the company had introduced waters with different flavors to the market. It's Better Up Here! is a trademarked tagline for the Arrowhead Water brand. In 2006, the label released Aquapod under the same brand umbrella.

Southern Californian newspaper The Desert Sun investigated Nestlé's bottling activities in 2015 and published findings that the water company had been operating in the San Bernardino National Forest without a permit since its last one expired in 1988. Local activists and retired forest personnel began to organize opposition to the Swiss company's continued withdrawal of water from a forest that is struggling from drought and bark beetles.

In December, 2017, the California Water Resources Control Board notified Nestlé that an investigation had concluded that the company does not have proper rights to about three-quarters of the water it withdraws for bottling, including water from the San Bernardino National Forest.

=== BlueTriton ===
In early April 2021, Nestlé Waters' bottling operations in the United States were sold to One Rock Capital Partners LLC and Metropoulos & Co. The unit rebranded to BlueTriton Brands, based in Stamford, Connecticut. In April 2021, California regulators moved to stop Nestlé from siphoning water from the forest.

On September 19, 2023, California regulators ordered the company to stop using a majority of the springs they've been relying upon for the past century. Regulators stated that the company does not have the water rights and that they have drained the creek to the point where it can't sustain the wildlife that is dependent upon it.

The label now reads as follows: "Proudly Sourced in British Columbia: Hope Springs, Hope B.C. Canada. Bottled for Bluetriton Brands Inc., Stamford CT."

ADDEMDUM - bottle still showing California locations bottling this water along with the Hope Springs location.

== See also ==
- Arrowhead Line
- Deer Park Spring Water
