= Marabel Morgan =

American writer

- Born: June 25, 1937 (age 89); Crestline, Ohio, U.S.
- Occupation: Writer
- Writing career
- Genre: Self-help
- Notable work: The Total Woman

Marabel Morgan (born June 25, 1937) is an American author of self-help books for married women, including The Total Woman (1973), Total Joy (1983), The Total Woman Cookbook (1976) and The Electric Woman (1986).

== Early life ==
Morgan's mother remarried, and Morgan had a good relationship with her stepfather until he died when she was 14.

== Relationship principles, and writing career ==
After reading widely, Morgan developed some relationship principles. In 1973 she published The Total Woman. The book sold more than 10 million copies and was the bestselling nonfiction book of 1974. Grounded in evangelical Christianity, it taught that "It's only when a woman surrenders her life to her husband, reveres and worships him and is willing to serve him, that she becomes really beautiful to him," and that "A Total Woman caters to her man's special quirks, whether it be in salads, sex, or sports." It is perhaps best remembered for suggesting that wives greet their man at the front door wearing sexy outfits; suggestions included "a cowgirl or a showgirl."

These lessons were reiterated in Morgan's popular Total Woman Seminars. Due in part to her sunny disposition and facility with soundbites, Morgan became an unofficial spokesperson for opposition to the women's movement. She was a regular guest on The Phil Donahue Show, was featured on the cover of Time Magazine, and was named one of the most influential women in America by People magazine and the 1975 World Almanac.

== In popular culture ==
An episode of the popular sitcom Maude entitled "Feminine Fulfillment" (February 28, 1977) dealt with main character Maude Findlay's best friend Vivian Harmon giving herself over to the practice of "Feminine Fulfillment", which Maude says is "like Total Woman." Vivian, expecting her husband Arthur, shocks Maude and her husband Walter by opening her door to them in a trench coat, revealing herself to be wrapped in saran wrap. Morgan's "Total Woman" is again referenced later in the episode, when more aspects of the movement are elucidated. Maude, a staunch feminist, is incensed by her friend's change, and confronts what she believes is her own husband's growing interest in being pampered in this manner. To test her husband, she decides to dress in saran wrap under a trench coat, only to be greeted by a male neighbor who has knocked on the Findlays' door. In an episode of James Garner's NBC-TV series The Rockford Files entitled "Trouble in Chapter 17" (September 23, 1977), the character of Anne Louise Clement (Claudette Nevins), who believes her book on how to be the perfect wife is the cause of the death threats against her and for whom Jim must act as bodyguard, is closely based on Marabel Morgan. A 1978 episode of Rhoda also dealt with the topic. Although the book carries a different title in the episode ("How to Be a Different Woman in Every Room"), the episode is entitled "The Total Brenda." In it, Rhoda's sister Brenda takes to wearing frilly dresses and fulfilling her fiancé's perceived fantasies on a variety of levels, much to the chagrin of liberated Rhoda. In the 1991 film Fried Green Tomatoes, the character played by Kathy Bates attempts to seduce her husband by wrapping herself in saran wrap; one takeoff on some of the suggestions in the book: "Be a pixie or a pirate -- a cowgirl or a showgirl." In a 2000 episode ("Rory's Dance") of Gilmore Girls, Lorelai (played by Lauren Graham) jokingly tells her mother (Kelly Bishop) that she would have come to the door to let her in, but she didn't have any saran wrap.

Morgan and The Total Woman were satirized in the Earwolf podcast The Complete Woman, which takes the format of a self-help audiobook from the 1960s with actress Amanda Lund portraying the fictional hostess Marabel May, a parody of Morgan. The Complete Woman was followed by two sequels, Complete Joy and The Complete Man.

== Personal life ==
Marabel Morgan has two grown daughters.

After her book-writing, Morgan worked in the health industry.

Morgan was diagnosed with thyroid cancer in 1987.

Her husband, Charlie, worked as a tax lawyer and sports player representative. As of 2017 they appear to continue to be married.

== Bibliography ==
- Morgan, Marabel. The Total Woman. Old Tappan, N.J.: F. H. Revell, 1973.
