= Sodality =

Type of Christian religious organization

In Christian theology, a sodality, also known as a syndiakonia, is a form of the Universal Church organized in a specialized, task-oriented society, as opposed to a local, diocesan body (a modality). In English, the term sodality is most commonly used by groups in the Catholic Church, Eastern Orthodox Church, Anglican Communion, Lutheran Church and Reformed Church, where they are also referred to as confraternities. Sodalities are expressed among Protestant Churches through the multitude of mission organizations, societies, and specialized ministries that have proliferated, particularly since the advent of the modern missions movement, usually attributed to Englishman William Carey in 1792.

In many Christian denominations, "modality" refers to the structure and organization of the local or universal church, composed of pastors or priests. By contrast, parachurch organizations are termed sodalities. These include missionary organizations and Christian charities or fraternities not linked to specific churches. Some theologians would include denominations, schools of theology, and other multi-congregational efforts in the sodality category. Sodalities can also include religious orders, monasteries, and convents.

== Origin ==
The Latin word sodalis means "companion", a sodality being an organization of companions or friends.

The sodalities of the Church are pious associations and are included among the confraternities and archconfraternities. Joseph Hilgers, writing in the Catholic Encyclopedia, states that it would not be possible to give a definition making a clear distinction between the sodalities and other confraternities. Confraternities and sodalities had their beginnings after the rise of the confraternities of prayer in the early Middle Ages (around 400–1000 AD), and developed rapidly from the end of the 12th century, with the rise of the great ecclesiastical orders, such as the Dominicans, the Carmelites, and the Servites. Other associations of this kind soon appeared under the jurisdiction of the local ordinary and had no particular connection with a religious order.

During the Middle Ages, many of these pious associations placed themselves under the special protection of the Blessed Virgin and chose her as their patron. The main object and duty of these societies were, above all, the practice of piety and works of charity. By the end of the Middle Ages (around 1400 AD), the Church experienced a crisis and lost power and influence. Two hundred years later, in the 16th century, the Church rose to renewed prosperity and the many new religious congregations and associations gave birth to numerous new confraternities and sodalities which worked with great success and, in some cases, still exist.

== Classes ==
A useful way to understand sodalities, and their place in the Christian Church, is to divide the sodalities, pious associations and confraternities into three broad types:

- Devotional confraternities – those which aim chiefly at personal piety, devotion, and the increase of love of God by special devotion to God, the Blessed Virgin, the angels, or the saints. In the first half of the twentieth century, such sodalities were the mainstay of Catholic parish life in many countries.
- Charitable confraternities – those which aim primarily at works of charity.
- Intercessory confraternities – those which focus on prayers for the dead, etc.

== A simplified definition ==
According to Rene Metz, "[Catholic] canon law provides for and favours pious associations of lay people ... The best-known of the confraternities is that of the Most Blessed Sacrament".

== See also ==
- Adelphopoiesis, Greek Christian brother making
- Apostolate
- Confraternity of priests
- Sodality of Our Lady
