= Religion in the 2008 United States presidential campaign =

The 2008 United States presidential campaign exposed candidates to a number of controversies based on associations with religious advisors, either in a personal capacity or through the pursuit of their political endorsements.

== Historical context ==
In recent decades American political history has given some latitude to freedom of religion in presidential campaigns, beginning with the public approval of John F. Kennedy, a member of the Roman Catholic Church. Today excessive scrutiny can draw criticism; as Stephanie Miller said, "How anyone can be held to this standard of being responsible for everything someone else has said is just beyond me." For example, there was little media interest in the relationship of Sun Myung Moon with George H. W. Bush, who has worked with Moon for over 15 years and has been estimated to have made $100,000 to $500,000 per speaking engagement praising the South Korean religious leader. Bill J. Leonard, dean of the divinity school and professor of church history at Wake Forest University said, "what we should have known after twenty years or more of discussing religion in the political square and at political election time: that American religion is very messy, and it doesn't fit all the categories and its very layered; there are many ways to look at it and we all read it in different ways with different glasses."

== Issues related to the candidates ==
- Hillary Clinton is a member of the United Methodist Church. She stated the Methodist church she attended as a youth gave her the opportunity to expand [her] horizons". For 15 years, she has been part of a secretive religious group called "The Fellowship Foundation", whose congregants consist of exclusively heavy political players, including scores of senators from both parties, and is best known for organizing the National Prayer Breakfast. The group was established in the 1930s by an evangelist named Abraham Vereide and is currently led by Doug Coe. In 2005, TIME Magazine named Coe as one of the 25 most powerful evangelicals, calling him "the Stealth Persuader." In 1993, journalist Jeff Sharlet went undercover to learn about the Fellowship, who he described as "secret theocrats" and as having "traditionally fostered strong ties with businessmen in the oil and aerospace industries" and various dictators. Sharlet quotes Coe as saying, "We work with power where we can, build new power where we can't", and says that the group's leaders "consider democracy a manifestation of ungodly pride". In her autobiography Living History, Hillary Clinton described Coe as "a genuinely loving spiritual mentor" who "became a source of strength and friendship" for her during her more difficult years as first lady. Clinton's associates distanced her from Coe during the 2008 campaign, saying that Clinton was not a member of The Fellowship and never contributed money it, and that Coe was not her minister.
- Rudolph Giuliani hired Monsignor Alan Placa, a Catholic priest and longtime friend who had officiated at his second wedding, to work in his consulting firm after he had been ordered to cease priestly duties amid accusations of molesting three children.
- Mike Huckabee, while he was a presidential candidate, named the late Religious Right leader Francis Schaeffer's Whatever Happened to the Human Race? as one of his favorite books, in which Schaeffer compares America to Hitler's Germany. Although Huckabee was not criticized for this association during his active campaign, the author's son, Frank Schaeffer, subsequently compared him to Barack Obama, noting that the books denounced and called for the violent overthrow of the U.S. government. Huckabee was never called upon to criticize Schaeffer, who had been a frequent guest in the home of Jack Kemp and in the Gerald Ford White House, met with Ronald Reagan, and assisted with the appointment of C. Everett Koop as U.S. Surgeon General.
- John McCain was criticized for several religious associations. He accepted support from Jerry Falwell and spoke at the commencement of his Liberty University. Falwell had been criticized for saying that gays, feminists, and liberals were in part to blame for 9/11. Although McCain had previously criticized Falwell as an "agent of intolerance", he stated that the two had come to an understanding of one another. He has accepted an endorsement by Reverend John Hagee, who was subsequently noted for anti-Catholic and anti-Muslim statements and declaring Hurricane Katrina a "judgment of God" for the "level of sin" in New Orleans. McCain later rejected Hagee's statements, and later rejected Hagee's endorsement, saying, "I feel I must reject his endorsement as well. In addition, McCain's "Catholics For McCain National Steering Committee" features Father Deal W. Hudson. While Hudson was a professor at Fordham University, he seduced an 18-year-old student, lost his tenured position, and resigned from a position on the Bush reelection team.
- Barack Obama, in 2004, said that he had three spiritual advisers: Jeremiah Wright, Michael Pfleger, and James Meeks. Each of them subsequently became subjects of controversy. Obama came under criticism because of his membership at Trinity United Church of Christ over a period of twenty years, at which parson Jeremiah Wright conducted services rooted in black liberation theology. Several excerpts selected from these services were widely broadcast, which some criticized as racist or anti-American, while others argued that Obama's beliefs were subject to excessive scrutiny due to racism or double standards. James Meeks drew controversy for comments calling some preachers and elected officials "house niggers" who would "fight you to protect that white man" were condemned for alleged antisemitism, homophobia, and racism. And Michael Pfleger, a Catholic priest, once implored his audience to 'drag' shop owner, John Riggio, from his shop 'like a rat' and 'snuff' him, and additionally said that legislators who vote against gun control bills should similarly be "snuffed our." Pfleger has also hosted Louis Farrakhan. In what was described as a case of "old-fashioned pork", Pfleger gave $1,200 to Obama campaigns in the Illinois state legislature between 1995 and 2001, and in 2001, Obama announced $225,000 in state grants to Pfleger's church. Obama later said,"My philosophy was that, if money was being distributed, then it would be inappropriate for me to not get my share for my district. ... Did I think it was the best way to prioritize government spending? No."
- Mitt Romney faced criticism for his role as part of a "dynastic family" within The Church of Jesus Christ of Latter-day Saints (LDS church), including issues of racial discrimination in the church's formerly held doctrine of not allowing African Americans into the priesthood, a practice which ended in 1978. Due to the controversy, Romney gave a major speech on the issue earlier in the campaign.
