= Mike Doyle (American politician) =

American politician (born 1953)

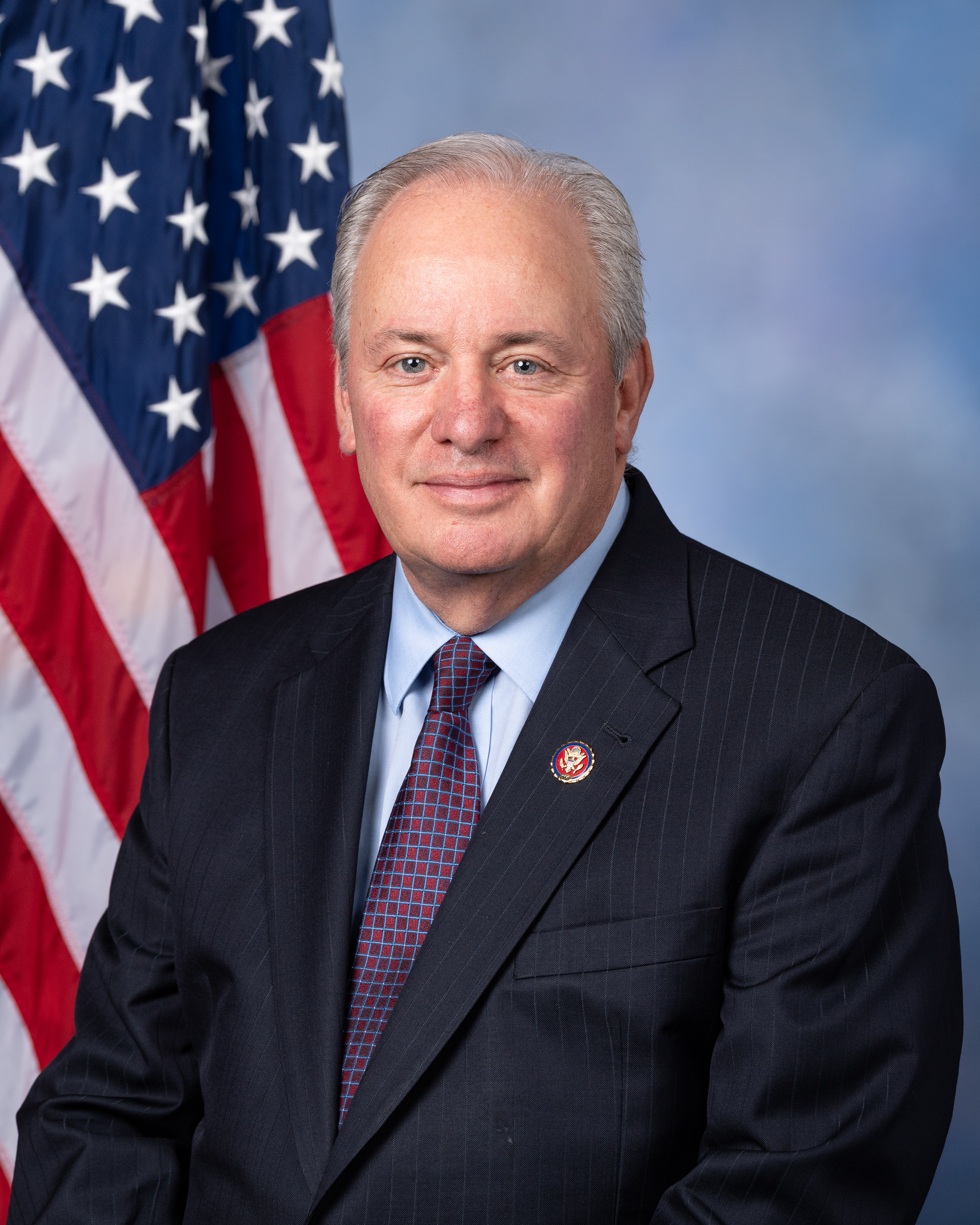

Member of the U.S. House of Representatives from Pennsylvania
- In office January 3, 1995 – December 31, 2022
- Preceded by: Rick Santorum
- Succeeded by: Summer Lee (redistricted)
- Constituency: 18th district (1995–2003); 14th district (2003–2019); 18th district (2019–2022)

Personal details
- Born: August 5, 1953 (age 73) Swissvale, Pennsylvania, U.S.
- Party: Democratic
- Spouse: Susan Doyle
- Children: 4
- Education: Pennsylvania State University (BS)
- Mike Doyle's voice Mike Doyle speaks in support of H.R.357, the GI Bill Tuition Fairness Act of 2014; Recorded February 3, 2014

Michael F. Doyle Jr. (born August 5, 1953) is an American politician who was the U.S. representative for Pennsylvania's 18th congressional district, serving from 1995 to 2022. He is a member of the Democratic Party. His district was based in Pittsburgh and included most of Allegheny County.

A native of Swissvale and graduate of the Pennsylvania State University, Doyle previously served as a member of the Swissvale Borough Council (1977–1981) and an aide to Republican State Senator Frank Pecora (1979–1994). He was first elected to Congress in 1994. Doyle announced that he would retire from Congress in 2022.

== Early life, education and career ==
Doyle was born in Swissvale, Pennsylvania, to Michael F. and Rosemarie Fusco Doyle. He graduated from Swissvale Area High School in 1971, and then enrolled at Pennsylvania State University. He worked in steel mills during his summers in college, and earned a Bachelor of Science degree in community development in 1975.

After college, Doyle worked as executive director of Turtle Creek Valley Citizens Union (1977–1979) and was elected to the Swissvale Borough Council in 1977. In 1979, he began work as chief of staff to Pennsylvania State Senator Frank Pecora. Like Pecora, Doyle was once a Republican who later switched parties to become a Democrat. In addition to his work for Pecora, he joined Eastgate Insurance Company as an insurance agent in 1982.

== U.S. House of Representatives ==
=== Elections ===
In 1994, Doyle was elected to Congress as a Democrat from the state's 18th district, which at the time was in Pittsburgh's eastern suburbs. The incumbent Republican, Rick Santorum, was elected to the United States Senate. Doyle won by almost 10 points, in one of the few bright spots in a bad year for Democrats. He was reelected three times with no substantial opposition.

In 2002, the Pennsylvania state legislature reconfigured Doyle's district, combining it with the Pittsburgh-based district of fellow Democrat William J. Coyne. In the process, the state legislature redrew most of western Pennsylvania's heavily Democratic areas into just two districts—the reconfigured 14th district and the 12th district of John Murtha. The potentially explosive situation of having two Democratic incumbents face each other in the primary was defused when Coyne announced his retirement (even though the district contained more of Coyne's former territory than Doyle's), leaving Doyle as the sole incumbent. The new district was by far the most Democratic district in western Pennsylvania, and Doyle was completely unopposed in 2002 and 2004; in 2006 and 2008, his only opposition was Green Party candidate Titus North.

In 2020, Doyle won the Democratic nomination against a progressive challenger, Jerry Dickinson, a law professor from the University of Pittsburgh School of Law. He did not seek reelection in 2022.

==== Electoral history ====
Electoral history of Mike Doyle
Year	Office		Party	Primary			General			Result	Swing	Ref.
Year	Office		Party	Total	%	P.	Total	%	P.	Result	Swing	Ref.
1994	U.S. House	18th	Democratic	16,571	19.84%	1st	101,784	54.80%	1st	Won	Gain	
1996	U.S. House	18th	Democratic	45,967	74.39%	1st	120,410	56.01%	1st	Won	Hold	
1998	U.S. House	18th	Democratic	42,288	65.08%	1st	98,363	67.68%	1st	Won	Hold	
2000	U.S. House	18th	Democratic	47,827	99.89%	1st	156,131	69.40%	1st	Won	Hold	
2002	U.S. House	14th	Democratic	72,886	99.97%	1st	123,323	99.93%	1st	Won	Hold	
2004	U.S. House	14th	Democratic	63,033	100.00%	1st	220,139	99.93%	1st	Won	Hold	
2006	U.S. House	14th	Democratic	54,213	75.76%	1st	161,075	89.78%	1st	Won	Hold	
2008	U.S. House	14th	Democratic	134,298	100.00%	1st	242,326	91.26%	1st	Won	Hold	
2010	U.S. House	14th	Democratic	71,511	100.00%	1st	122,073	68.79%	1st	Won	Hold	
2012	U.S. House	14th	Democratic	50,323	79.93%	1st	251,932	76.89%	1st	Won	Hold	
2014	U.S. House	14th	Democratic	57,039	84.06%	1st	148,351	100.00%	1st	Won	Hold	
2016	U.S. House	14th	Democratic	103,710	76.37%	1st	255,293	74.26%	1st	Won	Hold	
2018	U.S. House	18th	Democratic	52,080	75.60%	1st	231,472	96.08%	1st	Won	Hold	
2020	U.S. House	18th	Democratic	90,353	66.89%	1st	266,084	69.10%	1st	Won	Hold	
Source: Federal Election Commission | Election Results

=== Tenure ===
==== Time at the C Street Center ====
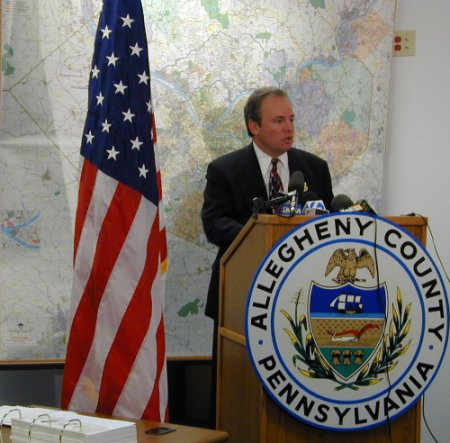
Doyle in 2005

Doyle came under fire in the 2000s for living in the C Street Center, a home run by Republican Christian fundamentalists in D.C. Additionally, he traveled with the group, or The Fellowship, to the Middle East in April 2009. The trip included travel to Lebanon, Jordan, and Israel on behalf of the Fellowship Foundation. Doyle met with political and religious leaders to help spread the Fellowship's agenda. Doyle's time with the Fellowship was mentioned in Jeff Sharlet's 2010 book C Street: The Fundamentalist Threat to American Democracy. Sharlet documented trips and events made by Doyle and other politicians on the Fellowship's behalf. Sharlet's books were the basis for the 2016 Netflix docuseries The Family.

=== Committee assignments ===
- Committee on Energy and Commerce
  - Subcommittee on Communications and Technology (Chairman)
  - Subcommittee on Energy and Power

=== Caucus memberships ===
- Congressional Arts Caucus
- Congressional Autism Caucus
- Congressional Steel Caucus
- Congressional Human Rights Caucus
- Congressional Internet Caucus
- House Robotics Caucus
- Ohio River Basin Congressional Caucus
- Climate Solutions Caucus
- Medicare for All Caucus

== Political positions ==
Doyle voted against authorizing military force in Iraq and against the $87 billion emergency spending bill to fund U.S. troops in Iraq and Afghanistan. He is the co-founder and co-chair of the Coalition on Autism Research and Education, also known as the Congressional Autism Caucus, and he offered an amendment that was included in the health reform law to ensure that insurance companies cover treatments for people with autism. He has also introduced legislation to provide better services for adults with autism.

Early in his career, Doyle opposed abortion, but he began to support abortion rights in the 2010s, receiving more favorable ratings from interest groups like NARAL while scoring a 0 with groups such as the National Right to Life Committee. In the early 2000s, he voted to prohibit "partial-birth/late term abortions". Doyle has also voted for the Hyde Amendment, which prohibits federal funding for abortions, except in cases of rape, incest, or when the mother's life is in danger. He supports using federal dollars for Title X, family planning services, and Planned Parenthood, with the existing provision that federal funds may not be used to perform abortions.

Doyle has fought against gun laws that would allow people to bring firearms into national parks, repeal any part of the assault or military style weapon ban, or repeal parts of the D.C. gun ban. This has led to declining ratings from gun rights interest groups such as the NRA Political Victory Fund (42% lifetime rating in 2000 to 0% in 2006) and Gun Owners of America. Conversely, he has received high ratings from gun control groups, receiving a 90% in the Brady Campaign to Prevent Gun Violence in 2003.

Doyle supports comprehensive immigration reform, voting for a bill that would repeal certain green card limitations, as well as the DREAM Act. These views have got him negative ratings from interest groups such as English First (0%) and the Federation for American Immigration Reform (0%). His immigration reviews resonate stronger with the National Latino Congreso/William C. Velásquez Institute and American Immigration Lawyers Association, from both of which he has received perfect scores.

Liberals have praised Doyle for his stance on copyright issues and his support of net neutrality. He was the lead sponsor of HR 1147, the Local Community Radio Act of 2009, which will expand low-power broadcasting to hundreds of new community radio stations. In 2010, he was given the Digital Patriot Award, along with Vint Cerf, one of the creators of the technology that runs the Internet. In February 2013, he became one of the sponsors of the Fair Access to Science and Technology Research Act to expedite open access to taxpayer-funded research. Doyle is a strong supporter of letting local governments provide Internet services in order to increase competition, improve service, and decrease prices.

Doyle used his position on the House Energy and Commerce Committee to lead negotiations on legislation addressing climate change and promoting energy independence while protecting clean domestic manufacturing. He has been criticized for taking hundreds of thousands of dollars from the fossil fuel industry. Doyle backs the CLEAN Act, which has been criticized as less aggressive than the Green New Deal, with goals for 2050 as opposed to 2030.

Doyle is an outspoken critic of the genocide in Sudan and Darfur. In a rally on April 28, 2007, he urged President Bush to uphold his promise of sending 20,000 peacekeepers to Darfur. He drew loud cheers when he said, "If we can have a surge in Iraq, there needs to be one in Sudan." He has said he supports LGBT rights, but voted for the 1996 Defense of Marriage Act, which prohibited same-sex marriage.

On October 16, 2012, Doyle released a statement criticizing the Republican budget introduced by Paul Ryan, saying that it would "be devastating for seniors in Pittsburgh." According to his report, this budget would eliminate new preventive care benefits for 113,000 Medicare beneficiaries in the district, as well as other cuts to Medicaid, affordable housing, and food stamps. "That's why I voted against the Ryan budget when it was considered by Congress earlier this year, and why I am fighting hard to oppose Congressional Republicans' misguided priorities."

On December 18, 2019, Doyle voted for both articles of impeachment against President Donald J. Trump.

=== Legislation supported ===
Doyle has had four of his bills passed into law since he took office: the Methane Hydrate Research and Development Act of 2000, the Do-Not-Call Improvement Act of 2007, the Local Community Radio Act of 2010, and "To designate the United States courthouse located at 700 Grant Street in Pittsburgh, Pennsylvania, as the "Joseph F. Weis Jr. United States Courthouse".

- Federal Communications Commission Process Reform Act of 2013 (H.R. 3675; 113th Congress) – a bill that would make a number of changes to procedures that the Federal Communications Commission (FCC) follows in its rulemaking processes. The FCC would have to act in a more transparent way as a result of this bill, forced to accept public input about regulations. Doyle argued in favor of the bill because "the FCC is charged with overseeing industries that make up one-sixth of our national economy."
- Autism CARES Act of 2014 – a bill that would amend the Public Health Service Act to reauthorize research, surveillance, and education activities related to autism spectrum disorders (autism) conducted by various agencies within the United States Department of Health and Human Services (HHS). Doyle co-sponsored the bill, saying that "every time new data is realized on autism spectrum disorders, the numbers become more and more troubling... this is why passage of the Autism Cares Act today is so important to continue research into the causes of autism."

Doyle was ranked the 38th most bipartisan member of the House of Representatives during the 114th United States Congress (and the third most bipartisan member of the House from Pennsylvania) in the Bipartisan Index created by The Lugar Center and the McCourt School of Public Policy that ranks members of the United States Congress by their degree of bipartisanship (by measuring the frequency each member's bills attract co-sponsors from the opposite party and each member's co-sponsorship of bills by members of the opposite party).

== Personal life ==
Doyle is Roman Catholic.

== See also ==
- C Street Center

U.S. House of Representatives
Preceded by Rick Santorum	Member of the U.S. House of Representatives from Pennsylvania's 18th congressional district 1995–2003	Succeeded by Tim Murphy
Preceded by William J. Coyne	Member of the U.S. House of Representatives from Pennsylvania's 14th congressional district 2003–2019	Succeeded by Guy Reschenthaler
Preceded by Conor Lamb	Member of the U.S. House of Representatives from Pennsylvania's 18th congressional district 2019–2022	Succeeded by Constituency abolished
