= Ralph Drollinger =

American clergyman and basketball player (born 1954)

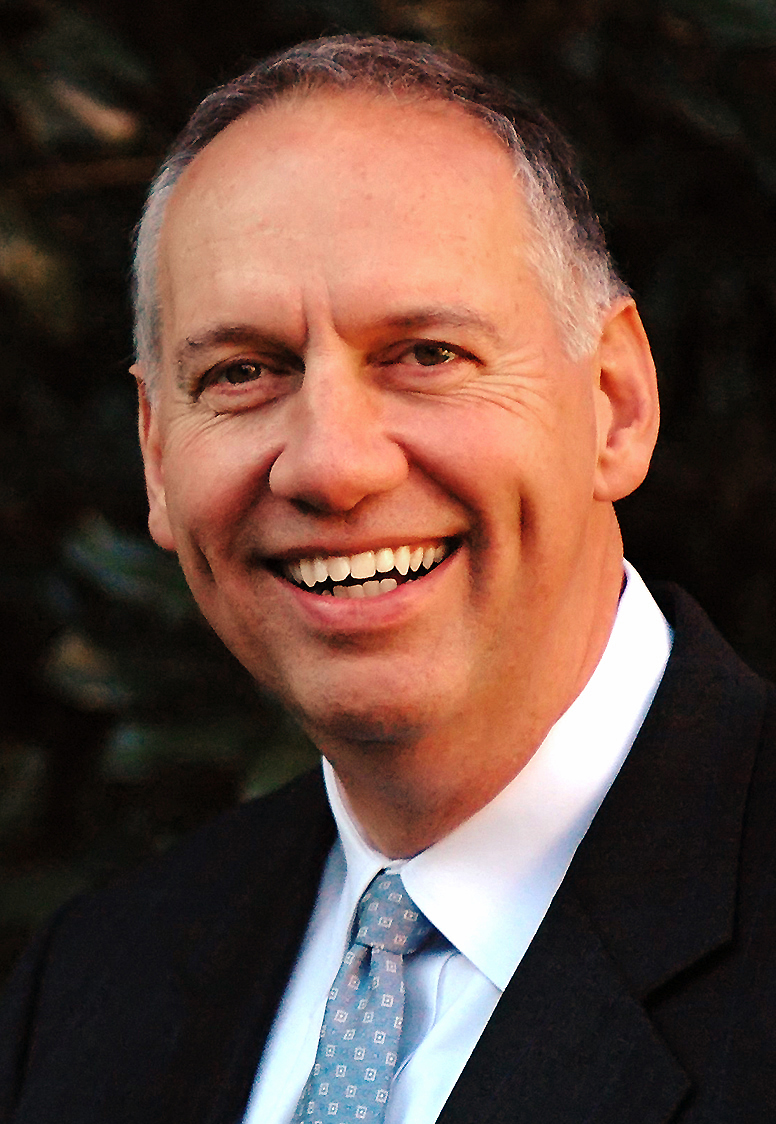
- Drollinger in 2013

Personal information
- Born: April 20, 1954 (age 72) La Mesa, California, U.S.
- Listed height: 7 ft 2 in (2.18 m)
- Listed weight: 250 lb (113 kg)

Career information
- High school: Grossmont (La Mesa, California)
- College: UCLA (1972–1976)
- NBA draft: 1978: 5th round, 105th overall pick
- Drafted by: Seattle SuperSonics
- Playing career: 1980–1981
- Position: Center
- Number: 52

Career history
- 1980–1981: Dallas Mavericks

Career highlights
- 2× NCAA champion (1973, 1975)
- Stats at NBA.com
- Stats at Basketball Reference

Ralph Kim Drollinger (born April 20, 1954) is an American clergyman and former professional basketball player. He led the "White House Bible Study Group", a study group sponsored by 10 cabinet members which held weekly meetings each Wednesday during the first Trump administration.

Drollinger played professionally as a center in the National Basketball Association (NBA). He played college basketball for the UCLA Bruins, winning two national championships under head coach John Wooden. He was selected in the fifth round of the 1978 NBA draft and played in the league for the Dallas Mavericks.

== Education ==
Drollinger attended Grossmont High School in La Mesa and the University of California, Los Angeles, where he received a Bachelor of Arts degree in Geography/Ecosystems. He later received a Masters of Divinity degree from The Master's Seminary.

== Basketball ==
Drollinger played basketball at Grossmont High School and was the CIF Southern Section MVP, as his team won the 1972 CIF championship as a high school All-American. He was a 7-foot-2-inch (2.18 m) and 250 pounds (110 kg) center and played collegiately at the University of California, Los Angeles (UCLA). He was the first player in NCAA history to go to four Final Four tournaments. He played for two national championship teams under coach John Wooden and after his first season, won the Seymour Armond Award as UCLA's most outstanding freshman. In his junior and senior years he was an Academic All-American.

Drollinger also played on America' World Cup Basketball team in 1978.

Drollinger was taken in the NBA draft three times. He chose to forgo the NBA during those years to instead play with Athletes in Action, an evangelistic basketball team that toured the world and preached the gospel at halftimes and represented America in the 1978 FIBA World Championship. He was selected with the 17th pick in the seventh round in 1976 by the Boston Celtics, with the 1st pick of the eighth round in 1977 by the New York Nets, and finally with the 17th pick of the fifth round in 1978 by the Seattle SuperSonics.

Drollinger was the first Dallas Maverick ever in the history of the then new NBA franchise.

He signed with the Dallas Mavericks in June 1980 as a free agent before they had hired Dick Motta as the head coach, motivated by his desire to attend Dallas Theological Seminary during his playing days. He played in only six games due to a knee injury which led to his retirement from basketball in March 1981. In the Mavs' inaugural season in 1980–81, he averaged 2.5 points, 3.2 rebounds and 2.3 assists per game.

Some years later after his retirement, Dr. James Dobson invited Drollinger to play in an early morning pick up game with Pete Maravich. That morning Maravich collapsed in the middle of the game from a massive heart attack. Dobson and Drollinger administered CPR, but to no avail; Maravich was pronounced dead upon arrival at the hospital.

He was selected as one of the Fabulous 50 Basketball Players by the San Diego Hall of Champions in 2011.

== Career statistics ==
Legend
GP	Games played	GS	Games started	MPG	Minutes per game
FG%	Field goal percentage	3P%	3-point field goal percentage	FT%	Free throw percentage
RPG	Rebounds per game	APG	Assists per game	SPG	Steals per game
BPG	Blocks per game	PPG	Points per game	**Bold**	Career high

=== NBA ===
==== Regular season ====
Year	Team	GP	MPG	FG%	3P%	FT%	RPG	APG	SPG	BPG	PPG
1980–81	Dallas	6	11.6	.500	–	.250	3.2	2.3	.2	.3	2.5

== Sports ministry ==
After his brief injury-plagued professional career, Drollinger founded and participated in a variety of sports related ministries. He helped found and was the executive director of Sports Outreach America, an umbrella trade organization of American church and parachurch sports ministries, such as the Fellowship of Christian Athletes, Athletes in Action, and Pro Athletes Outreach. He founded Sports Spectrum Magazine, a bi-monthly print magazine that features the testimony of Christian athletes, the "Path To Victory" Sports New Testament in conjunction with Biblica, He also founded, produced and financed Julius Erving's Sports Focus, a weekly one-half hour television anthology on ESPN featuring the testimony of Christian athletes and hosted by NBA player Julius Erving.

== Capitol ministries ==
In 1997, Drollinger founded Capitol Ministries, a ministry organization that provides Bible studies, evangelism and discipleship to political leaders. The organization has founded ministries in over 40 US State Capitols since then. Drollinger leads Capitol Ministries in Washington, D.C., and what is referred to internally as The Members Bible Study in the US Capitol. Drollinger also leads several senior Trump administration officials in a similar group at the White House, and provides bible study print-outs for Donald Trump. He is not associated with The Fellowship due to what he perceives as their unbiblical teaching.

By 2019 Capitol Ministries had established chapters in Mexico, Honduras, Paraguay, Costa Rica and Uruguay and was planning on opening new chapters in Nicaragua and Panama. Drollinger himself has travelled to Latin America to meet with local politicians. In March 2019 he had a breakfast meeting with members of the Legislative Assembly of Costa Rica and on 19 July 2019, after being personally invited by Nicaraguan president Daniel Ortega, Drollinger gave a speech at a political event in Managua that celebrated the 40th anniversary of the Sandinista Revolution.

== Political philosophy ==
Drollinger is a conservative evangelical Christian who describes his belief that there should indeed be an "institutional" separation of Church and State, but that the Church should still "influence" the State. Drollinger is also on record as being anti-LGBTQ, anti-women's rights, anti-immigration (he supports family separation at the border), a climate change denier, and declaring Catholicism as "one of the primary false religions of the world." In March 2020, Drollinger generated controversy when he appeared to link the COVID-19 pandemic with God's wrath and homosexuality. He later stated that he was misinterpreted and that he did not "believe that homosexuality played any role whatsoever in the coronavirus."

== Personal life ==
Drollinger is married to Danielle Madison, the founding and former executive director of California's Allied Business PAC, with whom he shares three children and seven grandchildren. He is also the son of the founder of Adventure16, a retail chain of mountaineering specialty stores located throughout Southern California. Drollinger is a mountaineer who has been reported to be the first person to have climbed every peak on the main ridge of the Sierra Nevada between Olancha and Sonora Pass, California, the 250 mile section of the ridge commonly referred to as the High Sierra.

== Publications ==
- Rebuilding America: The Biblical Blueprint ISBN 978-1-62467-024-4

== See also ==
- Frank Buchman
- The Fellowship (Christian organization)
- Oxford Group
- Abraham Vereide
