= Undertow =

Undertow may refer to:

- Undertow (water waves), a strong undercurrent flowing in a different direction from the surface current

== Film ==
- The Undertow (1916 film), a silent drama
- The Undertow (1915 film), a short silent film directed by Jack Harvey
- Undertow (1930 film), a romantic drama starring Mary Nolan
- Undertow (1949 film), a crime thriller directed by William Castle
- Undertow (1996 film), a film directed by Eric Red
- Undertow (2004 film), a thriller directed by David Gordon Green
- Undertow (2009 film), a Peruvian film
- Undertow (2018 film), an Australian TV film

== Television ==
- The Undertow (TV series), an upcoming Netflix series
- "Undertow" (CHiPs), an episode of CHiPs
- "Undertow" (The Killing), an episode of The Killing
- "Undertow" (Motive), an episode of Motive
- "Undertow" (The Wire), an episode of The Wire
- "The Undertow" (The O.C.), an episode of The O.C.

== Music ==
=== Performers ===
- Undertow (band), a 1990s American punk music group
- Undertow Music, an American independent artists' collective
  - The Undertow Orchestra, an indie rock supergroup associated with the collective

=== Albums ===
- Undertow (Blind Idiot God album), 1988
- Undertow (Drenge album) or the title song, 2015
- Undertow (Mark Seymour album), 2011
- Undertow (Tool album) or the title song, 1993
- Undertow, by Firefall, 1980
- Undertow, by Sidsel Endresen, 2000
- Undertow, by Stan Meissner, 1992

=== Songs and compossitions ===
- "Undertow" (song), by Warpaint, 2010
- "Undertow", by Ane Brun from It All Starts with One, 2011
- "Undertow", by As I Lay Dying from Shaped by Fire, 2019
- "Undertow", by Bowling For Soup from Bowling for Soup Goes to the Movies, 2005
- "Undertow", by Bryson Tiller from Bryson Tiller, 2024
- "Undertow", by Chroma Key from Dead Air for Radios, 1998
- "Undertow", by Coldrain from Vena II, 2016
- "Undertow", by Genesis from ...And Then There Were Three..., 1978
- "Undertow", by Ivy from Long Distance, 2000
- "Undertow", by James LaBrie from Impermanent Resonance, 2013
- "Undertow", by Kim Carnes from Voyeur, 1982
- "Undertow", by Leonard Cohen from Dear Heather, 2004
- "Undertow", by Lisa Hannigan from At Swim, 2016
- "Undertow", by Lush from Split, 1994
- "Undertow", by Madder Mortem from Mercury, 1999
- "Undertow", by Marty Friedman from Inferno, 2014
- "Undertow", by Molotov from Apocalypshit, 1999
- "Undertow", by Mr. Big from What If..., 2010
- "Undertow", by Pain of Salvation from Remedy Lane, 2002
- "Undertow", by Pet Shop Boys from Super, 2016
- "Undertow", by R.E.M. from New Adventures in Hi-Fi, 1996
- "Undertow", by Sara Bareilles from Careful Confessions, 2004
- "Undertow", by Stars from Sad Robots, 2008
- "Undertow", by Suzanne Vega from Suzanne Vega, 1985
- "Undertow", by Timbaland from Shock Value II, 2009
- "Undertow", by Ugly Kid Joe from Motel California, 1996
- "Undertow", by Warrant from Ultraphobic, 1995
- Undertow, a composition for concert band by John Mackey, 2008
- "The Undertow", by Crystal Lake from The Weight of Sound, 2026
- "The Undertow", by For the Fallen Dreams from Six, 2018
- "The Undertow", by Lamb of God from Resolution, 2012
- "The Undertow", by Passion Pit from Tremendous Sea of Love, 2017
- "The Undertow", by Red Fang from Murder the Mountains, 2011

== Other uses ==
- Undertow (roller coaster), a roller coaster at Santa Cruz Beach Boardwalk, California
- Undertow (video game), on Xbox Live Arcade
- The Undertow: Scenes from a Slow Civil War, a 2023 book by Jeff Sharlet
- Undertow, a novel by Elizabeth Bear
- Undertow, an action figure in the toy series G.I. Joe: A Real American Hero
