= The Family (miniseries) =

2019 American docuseries on Netflix

- Genre: Docuseries
- Directed by: Jesse Moss
- Country of origin: United States
- Original language: English
- No. of seasons: 1
- No. of episodes: 5

Production
- Executive producers: Alex Gibney; Stacey Offman; Richard Perello; Jeff Sharlet
- Cinematography: Frederick Elmes; Thorsten Thielow
- Editor: Pax Wassermann
- Running time: 46–54 minutes

Original release
- Network: Netflix
- Release: August 9, 2019

The Family is an American documentary television miniseries that premiered on Netflix on August 9, 2019. The series examines a conservative Christian group—known as the Family or the Fellowship—its history, and investigates its influence on American politics.

The series was executive produced by Jeff Sharlet, who previously wrote books about the same organization, including C Street: The Fundamentalist Threat to American Democracy and The Family: The Secret Fundamentalism at the Heart of American Power.

== Cast ==
- David Rysdahl as Jeff Sharlet.
  - Sharlet appears as himself in the documentary interview portions of the series.
- Ben Rosenfield.
- Zachary Booth
- Michael Park
- Nate Klingenberg
- Tessa Albertson
- James Cromwell as Douglas Coe

== Episodes ==
No.	Title	Original release date
1	"Submersion"	August 9, 2019
Douglas Coe is the leader of the Family; he doesn't seek fame and wants to maintain a low profile. His followers are groups of men and women in their 20s in gender-segregated groups. Members of Congress and foreign dignitaries are routinely hosted at The Cedars. The men live in a dormitory at the Cedars called the Ivanwald.
2	"Chosen"	August 9, 2019
The Fellowship believes in the leadership of those who are chosen. They adhere to Calvinist doctrines better known as Presbyterianism in the United States.
3	"New World Order"	August 9, 2019
Abraham Vereide starts hosting the National Prayer Breakfast in 1953 in Washington D.C. After the fall of the Soviet Union in 1990, Aleksandr Torshin forges close ties with Doug Coe.
4	"Dictators, Murderers & Thieves"	August 9, 2019
Mark D. Siljander is indicted while campaigning against reproductive rights in foreign countries. Siljander accepted donations from terrorist-linked Muslim groups.
5	"Wolf King"	August 9, 2019
Donald Trump, raised as a Presbyterian, praises Norman Vincent Peale.

== Reception ==
Critics have generally praised the series. For Decider, Joel Keller described it as having "a lot of potential to fascinate". Joel Mayward of Cinemayard described the series as "chilling" but also wrote that it felt "muddled and redundant". Vulture's Jen Chaney noted that the series focused predominantly on the Fellowship's influence on conservatives, and excluded Democratic involvement.

== Release ==
The Family was released on August 9, 2019 on Netflix.

== See also ==
- Fellowship Foundation (The Family)
- National Prayer Breakfast
- Douglas Evans Coe
- Richard Christian Halverson
- Harold Hughes
- Christian fundamentalism
- Christian right
- C Street Center
