= National Prayer Breakfast =

American yearly religious event

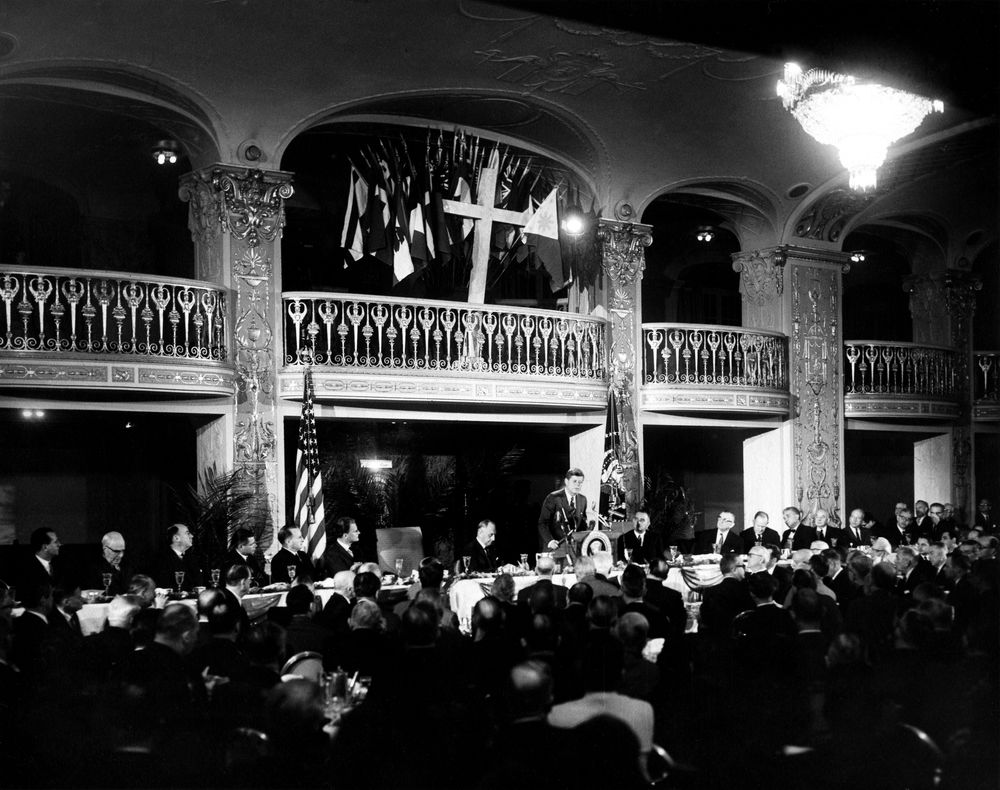
President John F. Kennedy addresses the Prayer Breakfast in 1961.

The National Prayer Breakfast is a yearly event held in Washington, D.C., usually on the first Thursday in February. The founder of this event was Abraham Vereide. The event—which is actually a series of meetings, luncheons, and dinners—has taken place since 1953 and has been held at least since the 1980s at the Washington Hilton on Connecticut Avenue NW.

The National Prayer Breakfast, held in the Hilton's International Ballroom, is yearly attended by some 3,500 guests, including international invitees from over 100 countries. Until 2023, it was hosted by members of the United States Congress and organized on their behalf by the Christian organization Fellowship Foundation. (Note: the Fellowship Foundation organization is also known by its DBA name International Foundation) Since 2023, the official event has been run by the National Prayer Breakfast Foundation. It is designed to be a forum for the political, social, and business elite to assemble and pray together. Since the inception of the National Prayer Breakfast, several U.S. states and cities and other countries have established their own annual prayer breakfast events.

The National Prayer Breakfast split from the Fellowship Foundation (reported in some press under its DBA (Note: DBA - Doing-Business-As) name International Foundation) in 2023 due to recent controversies and questions regarding the transparency of the coordination of the event. There was a letter signed by 30 groups to boycott the event. The Congress will take over the coordination of the event starting in 2023.

== History ==
The origin of the National Prayer Breakfast is traced back to prayer groups with business and civic leaders in Seattle, organized by Abraham Vereide in the 1930s. When he moved to Washington, DC, he established similar groups with members of Congress. In 1953, President Dwight D. Eisenhower attended a meeting by invitation of Congressmen, Vereide, and Billy Graham. Vereide's successor Douglas Coe and Rev. Richard C. Halverson have also carried leadership roles in organizing the event. A government leader was quoted as saying that the Breakfast and Coe's influence offers foreign leaders access to the President that "circumvents the State Department and usual vetting... that such a meeting would require," and other participants indicated that their purpose for attending was political.

Initially called the Presidential Prayer Breakfast, the name was changed in 1970 to the National Prayer Breakfast. Every American president since Dwight D. Eisenhower has participated in the annual event.

On February 5, 2026, Donald Trump spoke at the Breakfast and claimed that immigrants threaten churchgoers, referred to a sitting, Republican member of the House of Representatives as a "moron" for his opposition to Republican legislation, discussed his inability to sleep well on airplanes, and mocked people for praying at mealtime.

== Speakers ==
Each year several guest speakers visit the various events connected with the National Prayer Breakfast. However, the main event, the Thursday morning breakfast, typically has two special guest speakers: the President of the United States and a guest whose identity is kept confidential until that morning. Past keynote speakers include:

- 1973 U.S. Senator Mark Hatfield (R-OR)
- 1977 (25th Annual NPB) U.S. House Majority Leader James Wright (D-TX)
- 1987 Elizabeth Dole, United States Secretary of Transportation
- 1994 (42nd Annual NPB) Mother Teresa of Calcutta
- 1997 (45th Annual NPB) Dr. Ben Carson, author, neurosurgeon and the Director of Pediatric Neurosurgery at Johns Hopkins Hospital
- 1998 (46th Annual NPB) U.S. Senator Connie Mack III (R-FL)
- 1999 (47th Annual NPB) Max Lucado, author and pastor
- 2001 (49th Annual NPB) U.S. Senator Bill Frist (R-TN), physician, businessman, and politician
- 2005 (53rd Annual NPB) Ambassador Tony P. Hall, U.S. Representative to the U.N. Agencies for Food and Agriculture
- 2006 (54th Annual NPB) Bono, Irish singer/songwriter and humanitarian
- 2007 (55th Annual NPB) Dr. Francis S. Collins, director of the National Human Genome Research Institute
- 2008 (56th Annual NPB) Ward Brehm, a Minnesotan who chairs the U.S.-African Development Foundation
- 2009 (57th Annual NPB) Tony Blair, former Prime Minister of the United Kingdom
- 2010 (58th Annual NPB) José Luis Rodríguez Zapatero, Prime Minister of Spain
- 2011 (59th Annual NPB) Randall Wallace, Academy Award-Winning Motion Picture Producer/Writer/Director
- 2012 (60th Annual NPB) Eric Metaxas, author
- 2013 (61st Annual NPB) Dr. Ben Carson, author, neurosurgeon and the Director of Pediatric Neurosurgery at Johns Hopkins Hospital
- 2014 (62nd Annual NPB) Rajiv Shah, Administrator of the US Agency for International Development
- 2015 (63rd Annual NPB) Darrell Waltrip, Fox Sports broadcaster and inductee to the NASCAR Hall of Fame.
- 2016 (64th Annual NPB) Mark Burnett and Roma Downey, television producers
- 2017 (65th Annual NPB) Barry Black, chaplain of the US Senate
- 2018 (66th Annual NPB) U.S. Representative Steve Scalise (R-LA)
- 2019 (67th Annual NPB) Gary Haugen, CEO of International Justice Mission
- 2020 (68th Annual NPB) Arthur C. Brooks, author of Love Your Enemies
- 2022 (70th Annual NPB) Bryan Stevenson, executive director of the Equal Justice Initiative

Many of the past addresses by U.S. Presidents to the National Prayer Breakfast are available online.

== Guests ==
While Members of the U.S. Congress, of the U.S. Cabinet, and of the diplomatic corps in Washington are typically invited to participate in the National Prayer Breakfast, the other more than 3,000 guests come from a variety of walks of life. Six heads of state attended the 2008 breakfast, along with Members of the European Parliament; United Nations diplomats; European, Asian, African and Latin American politicians; religious leaders; missionaries working in various countries; U.S. and foreign business leaders; and students. Benazir Bhutto, former prime minister of Pakistan, participated on more than one occasion, and a video interview of her speaking about the National Prayer Breakfast, its meaning and its impact on her faith, was featured at the 2008 closing dinner. In 2006, King Abdullah II of Jordan addressed the Thursday lunch. Ricardo Maduro, president of Honduras, addressed the same lunch in 2005. Musical guests have included Andrea Bocelli, Wintley Phipps, Michael W. Smith, Point of Grace, and CeCe Winans. In 2014, for the first time since Ukraine's Independence, The Patriarch of The Ukrainian Orthodox Church, Patriarch Philaret was present. In 2015, the Dalai Lama addressed the International Lunch, one of the annual National Prayer Breakfast-related events.

== Reaction ==
Rev. Jim Wallis, founder and president of the Christian social change group Sojourners and a regular attendee of the National Prayer Breakfast, said of the event "it's sort of a time to — where people want to acknowledge the importance of prayer and faith. And that can be kind of a civil religion, civic faith kind of common denominator thing. Or it can be much too sectarian where some people feel left out of it. I remember my favorite ones are when Bono spoke at the prayer breakfast and talked about every faith tradition calls us to stand with those who are left out, left behind. I remember Senator Mark Hatfield spoke years ago when I was in seminary and he called the war in Vietnam a national sin and shame in front of Richard Nixon and Henry Kissinger. I saw their faces and they weren't happy with that. So when it can raise up issues that we ought to be accountable to, whether we are religious or not, I think that's when it's probably at its best."

In 2010, Citizens for Responsibility and Ethics in Washington asked President Barack Obama and Congressional leaders to refrain from attending the National Prayer Breakfast. Executive Director Melanie Sloan criticized the organizing group, The Fellowship, for being what she described as intolerant and secretive. Over the years, other watchdog groups, like the Freedom From Religion Foundation, also criticize the opacity, and maintain the NPB, launched to oppose FDR's New Deal policies, is a Christian nationalist movement, pretends to be bipartisan, and uses unwitting Democrats for cover and legitimacy. In 2023, various groups - religious and secular, Black, LGBTQ - lobbied President Joe Biden to break tradition and cut ties with the event.

On Thursday, February 6, 2020, President Donald Trump addressed the gathering, including these statements encouraging freedom of religion and appreciation for those attending, citing their bravery, brilliance, and fortitude: "But I’ll tell you what we are doing: We’re restoring hope and spreading faith. We’re helping citizens of every background take part in the great rebuilding of our nation. We’re declaring that America will always shine as a land of liberty and light unto all nations of the world. We want every nation to look up to us like they are right now."

Also in 2020, the event marked the highest level state visit by a Republic of China (Taiwan) official since 1979 when Vice-president Lai Ching-te attended the National Prayer Breakfast.

The National Prayer Breakfast is featured in the Netflix miniseries The Family, from the book The Family: The Secret Fundamentalism at the Heart of American Power.

== Similar events in other countries ==
=== Australia ===
The Australian National Prayer Breakfast is hosted by the Parliamentary Christian Fellowship with the support of a small organising committee. Journalist Jeff Sharlet believes that American congressmen were writing to counterparts in Australia in the 1960s, encouraging their own event. In time, the Parliamentary Christian Fellowship, started by Kim Beazley Sr. and Mervyn Lee, launched the first Australian Prayer Breakfast in 1986. Key organisers and prominent participants have included Bruce Baird had and figures with links with the Fellowship such as brothers Jock Cameron and Ross Cameron. Prominent speakers at the National Prayer Breakfast and associated side events include Mark Scott, Major General Michael Jeffery, Cardinal George Pell and Tim Costello. For the 2019 Australian National Prayer Breakfast people were invited to bring their MP because of Paul's call to “pray for all those in authority”. From that time, Leon Hribar has helped organize the Australian National Prayer Breakfast.

=== United Kingdom ===
The National Parliamentary Prayer Breakfast in the UK is organised by a cross party group of MPs and Peers, working with the support of Christians in Parliament APPG; it is not associated with the US NPB. The event normally takes place over two days around the beginning of July, inside the Houses of Parliament. The main breakfast is normally held in Westminster Hall.

== Gallery ==
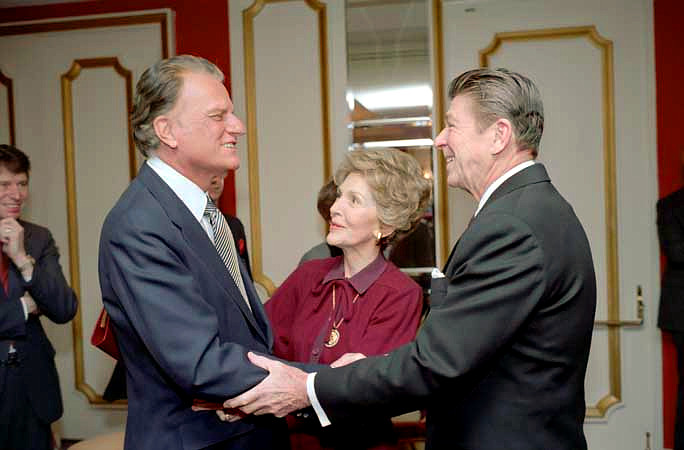
President Ronald Reagan and Nancy Reagan greet Billy Graham at the National Prayer Breakfast held at the Washington Hilton, 1981.

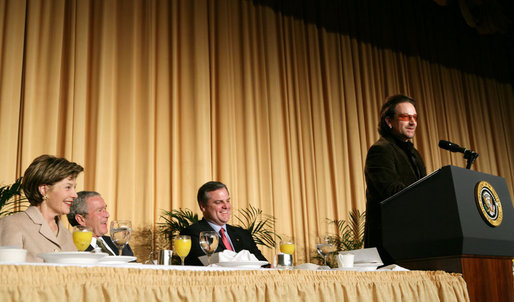
President George W. Bush, Laura Bush, and Sen. Mark Pryor (D-Ark.) break out in laughter as Bono speaks during the National Prayer Breakfast at the Washington Hilton, 2006.

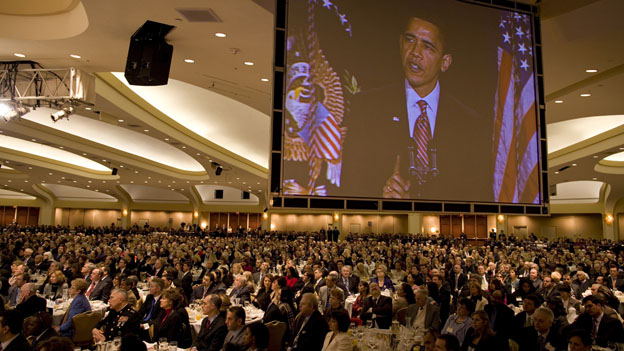
President Barack Obama speaks at the National Prayer Breakfast in February 2009.

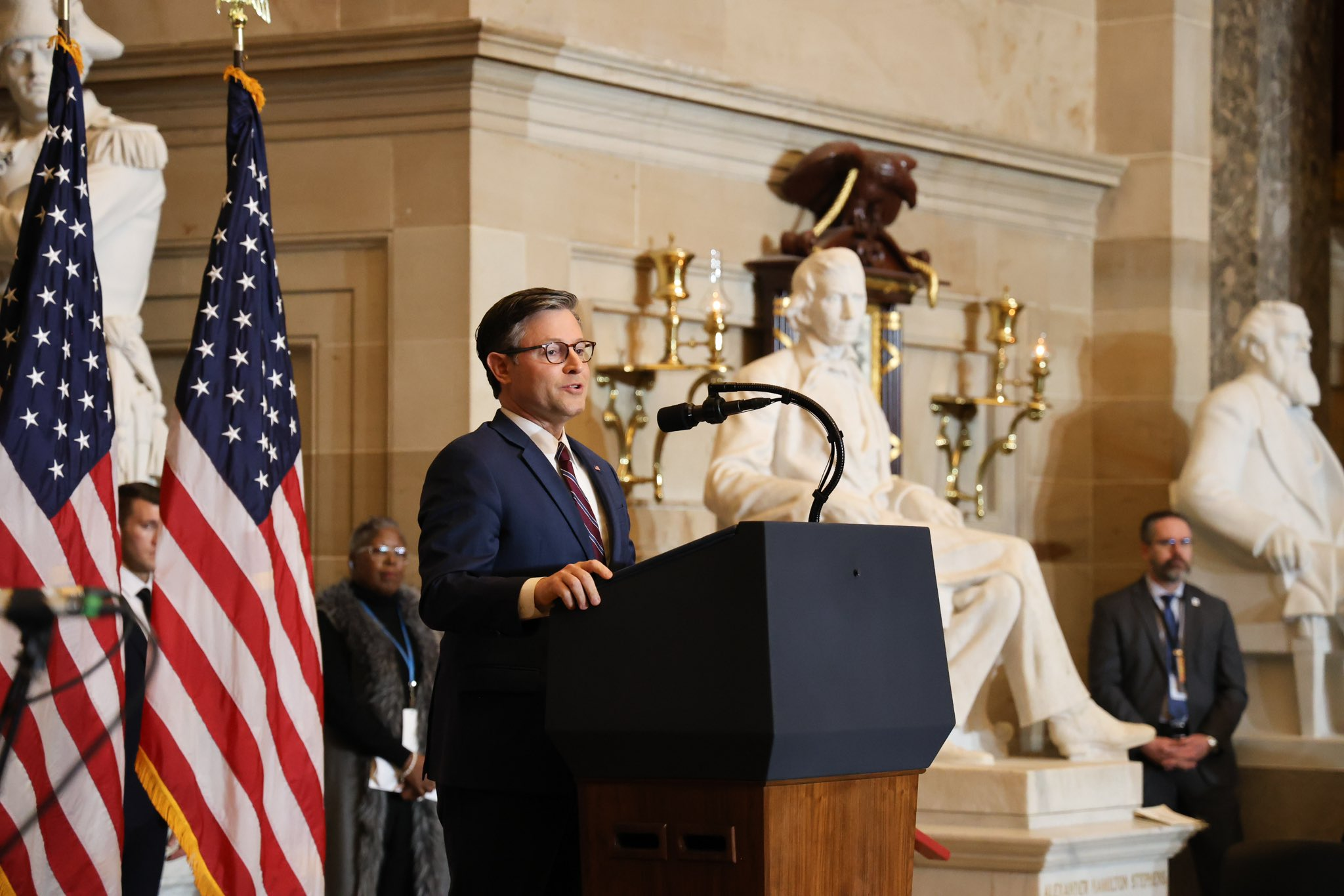
House Speaker Mike Johnson speaks at the 73rd National Prayer Breakfast in February 2025.

== See also ==
- National Catholic Prayer Breakfast (no affiliation with National Prayer Breakfast)
- Fellowship Foundation
- Prayer meeting
- Prayer Tower
- Jerusalem Prayer Breakfast
- Jesus Calls Prayer Tower
