= Curtis P. Coe =

American professor and missionary (1864-1922)

- Born: Curtis Pearre Coe; May 26, 1864; Dwight, Illinois
- Died: June 24, 1922 (aged 58); Scranton, Pennsylvania
- Occupation: Professor
- Known for: Missionary work at Woody Island
- Political party: Prohibition Party
- Relatives: Douglas Coe (grandson); Robert E. Coe Jr. (great-nephew); Descendants of Robert Coe

Academic background
- Education: University of Washington (AB)

Academic work
- Institutions: United States Department of Agriculture; McMinnville College; Keystone Academy
- Main interests: Agriculture, Agricultural economics, Education

Curtis Pearre Coe (May 26, 1864 — June 24, 1922) was an American professor, missionary, writer, and experimental agriculturalist known for his work in and around Kodiak, Alaska, and McMinnville, Oregon. He founded the first newspaper in Kodiak in 1899, The Orphanage News Letter, and was its first editor. He also organized the first Baptist church in the state at Woody Island; he was the first pastor.

After performing research work for the United States Department of Agriculture while running a baptist orphanage school in Alaska, he taught at McMinnville College and Keystone Academy.

== Career ==
After Coe was ordained a Baptist minister in Paris, Texas, in 1893, he was sent to Arizona as a missionary for the Hopi (Moqui) native people. By the end of the following year, he reported that his life had been threatened by the natives. He then was reassigned to Woody Island in 1895 where he was the first superintendent of the Kodiak Baptist Orphanage. Under Coe's administration, the mission combined religious education with vocational labor. Coe established a fishing operation connected with the mission, in which boys caught, salted, and prepared salmon and cod for sale. According to a contemporary newspaper account, the enterprise was intended both to provide revenue for the mission and to give the boys "profitable work." Coe also instructed children in gardening, farming, construction, and other trades. The same account described these programs as a means of preparing Native children for life away from their home communities, expressing concern that children who returned to their "former surroundings" would "drift back into their old ways of living."

Coe served as a volunteer weather observer for the United States Department of Agriculture (USDA). In 1900, Coe recorded the 1900 Kodiak earthquake observations for the USDA as part of his weather report. Beginning in 1901, the USDA contracted with Coe in agricultural experiments under the direction of the Alaska Agricultural Experiment Stations. Charles Christian Georgeson, the USDA's special agent in charge of the Alaska stations Coe with seeds and other materials and asked him to test their suitability to the climate of the Kodiak region. The arrangement preceded the establishment of the Alaska Agricultural and Forestry Experiment Station at Kodiak in 1907. Coe tested numerous varieties of grains and vegetables, recording planting dates, soil conditions, growth, maturity, and their potential either for livestock feed. Coe kept detailed observations on cattle, horses, goats, and poultry, using the orphanage's livestock to evaluate how animals could be maintained under Kodiak conditions.

In 1908, Coe accepted a professorship at McMinnville College, and was elected Dean of the commerce department. Coe joined the Prohibition Party and was appointed the party's nominee for congress in the United States House of Representatives in Oregon's 1st congressional district in 1914. He was defeated by incumbent Republican candidate Willis C. Hawley. The News-Review described Hawley's reelection as a "foregone conclusion" because of his experience and the district's Republican majority. At the Oregon Prohibition Party's annual conference in December 1914, Coe argued for maintaining the party organization after the adoption of statewide prohibition. He stated that administering the prohibition law was "nine-tenths of the battle" and that much of the work remained to be done. He also credited Prohibition Party voters with providing a substantial share of the support for the successful prohibition amendment. Coe's congressional platform was primarily prohibition of alcohol, women's suffrage, and the abolition of child labor.

After his congressional defeat, Coe removed to Seattle where he attended the University of Washington. He was awarded a Bachelor of Arts from the College of Liberal Arts in 1919. In 1920, Coe relocated to Scranton, Pennsylvania, after he was elected as principal of Keystone Academy. He died unexpectedly after an operation two years later.

== Family ==
Coe was born in Dwight, Illinois, to Joel Horton and Phoebe née Pearre Coe. He was a descendant of American colonial Robert Coe. Joel was among the first settlers of Livingston County, Illinois. Coe had nine siblings, two of which were from his father's first wife, Wealthy née Clark who died while they were babies. His oldest half-sibling, Arthur Edwin, was a farm owner and businessman in Coats, Kansas, and his other half-sibling, Lewis Clark, was a dentist in Chicago. Arthur's granddaughter is painter Margaret Coe, who is the mother of Karin Clarke, also a painter.

Coe married Annie Bell née Evans on April 4, 1895. They had 5 children, including Curtis Evans, who succeeded him at Keystone Academy; Edmund Pearre, who taught in the United States Navy and at St. George's School; Lulu Edna, who was acting Dean of women at Bucknell University and was the assistant Dean of women at the State Teachers College at Harrisonburg; Milton Evans who was an Oregon state superintendent of schools. Milton's son was Douglas Coe.

== Publications ==
- Coe, Curtis Pearre (April 1, 1905). "Agriculture and Stock in Alaska". The Ranch. pp. 14–15.
- Coe, Curtis P. (July 15, 1907). "Galloway Cattle in Alaska". The Ranch. p. 18.
- Coe, Curtis P. (November 1, 1907). "Many Helps in Farming". The Ranch. p. 10.
