= C Street Center =

Townhouse in Washington, DC

Coordinates: 38.88594°N 77.00455°W

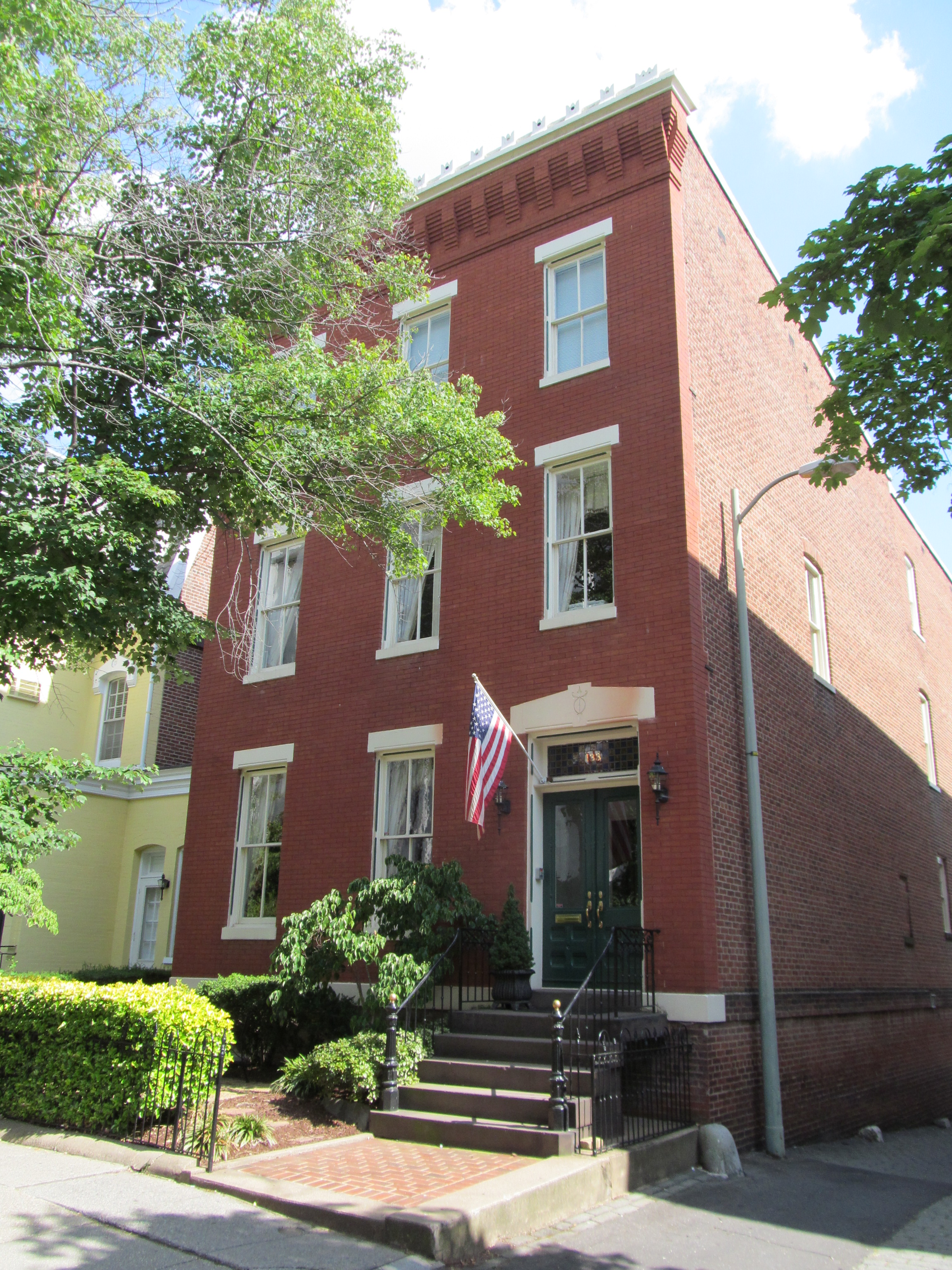
C Street Center

The C Street Center is a three-story brick townhouse in Washington, D.C. operated by The Fellowship. It is the former convent for nearby St. Peter's Church. It is located at 133 C Street, SE, behind the Madison Building of the Library of Congress and a short distance from the United States Capitol, Republican National Committee, Democratic National Committee and House of Representatives Office Buildings. The structure has 12 bedrooms, nine bathrooms, five living rooms, four dining rooms, three offices, a kitchen, and a small chapel.

The facility houses mostly Republican members of Congress but prominent Democrats including Hillary Clinton are members of this organization. Prior to its current use, the building housed the offices of Ralph Nader's Congress Watch, Critical Mass Energy Project, and the Tax Project.

== Background ==
The Reverend Louis P. Sheldon had told the Los Angeles Times in 2002 that the Fellowship opened the C Street house to members of Congress because "it helps them out. A lot of men don't have an extra $1,500 to rent an apartment. So the Fellowship house does that for those who are part of the Fellowship." (In 2002, the LA Times reported that rent was $600 per month for each resident and meals cost extra, but cleaning is provided by eight college-age volunteers from the Fellowship and a "house mother" who washes the congressmen's sheets and towels.) Doug Coe, leader of the Fellowship, also told the LA Times that "I give or loan money to hundreds of people, or have my friends do so," including to members of Congress but he did not recall the details.

The house is the locale for:

- Wednesday prayer breakfasts for United States Senators, which have been attended by Senators Sam Brownback, Tom Coburn, James Inhofe, John Ensign, Susan Collins and Hillary Clinton.
- Tuesday night dinners for members of Congress and other Fellowship associates.
- An annual Ambassador Luncheon. The 2006 event was attended by ambassadors from Turkey, Macedonia, Pakistan, Jordan, Algeria, Armenia, Egypt, Belarus, Mongolia, Latvia and Moldova.
- Receptions for foreign dignitaries, including the then Prime Minister of Australia, Kevin Rudd.

== Controversy ==
=== Tax status, subsidized congressional housing, and other benefits ===
C Street has been the subject of controversy over its claimed tax status as a church, the ownership of the property and its connection to the Fellowship, and the reportedly subsidized benefits the facility provides to members of Congress.

Until 2009, C Street was exempt from real property taxes because it was classified as a "special purpose" use as a church. District of Columbia law exempts from taxation "buildings belonging to religious corporations or societies" which meet certain criteria. In August 2009, the property was reclassified. A DC city official said "it was determined that portions are being rented to private individuals for residential purposes. As a result, the exemption was partially revoked and adjusted so that only 34 percent is now tax-exempt and 66 percent has become taxable."

In February 2010, the president of the Fellowship, Richard Carver, told The Columbus Dispatch that his "charitable organization" does not own the C Street Center "and has no control over its policy." Carver added he does not know who owns or runs the center: "It is simply not a part of anything we do."

In response to Carver's statement, MSNBC host Rachel Maddow produced an official Corrective Deed of September 23, 2009 for C Street signed on behalf of C Street Center, Inc. by Marty B. Sherman, Secretary, who is listed as "Associate" on the Family's 2008 tax filing. Property records show that in 1980, C Street was purchased by Youth with a Mission, Washington, D.C., Inc. On July 19, 1983, the organization changed its name to "Youth with a Mission Renewal Ministries, Inc." On November 28, 1984, the organization changed its name to "FaithAmerica". On September 3, 1985, the organization changed its name to "Youth with a Mission National Christian Center, Inc." On February 27, 1992, the organization changed its name to "C Street Center, Inc." The aforementioned Corrective Deed signed by a Fellowship Associate changed the name on the title to reflect changes in name of its owner.

Also, the Fellowship lists C Street Center on its 2007 Form 990 as a related organization through common members, governing bodies, trustees, officers, etc. In 2002, the Los Angeles Times reported that IRS records show that the Fellowship gave C Street Center $450,000 in grants and loans from 1994 to 2002.

As noted above, many of the present and past residents of C Street, including Senators Tom Coburn and John Ensign and Representatives Zach Wamp and Bart Stupak, have publicly acknowledged working with the Fellowship or are documented as having done so.

"The C Street property is a church," Chip Grange, an attorney for the Fellowship told the LA Times in 2002: "It is zoned as a church. There are prayer meetings, fellowship meetings, evangelical meetings ... Our mission field is Capitol Hill."

On February 23, 2010, Clergy Voice, consisting of 13 pastors from mainstream Christian denominations, filed a lawsuit with the IRS challenging the remainder of the C Street facility's tax-favored status as a church, on the grounds that many ordinary church activities did not occur there and due to the secretiveness of the organization.

Clergy Voice is represented pro bono by Marcus Owens, who, prior to his current role in private practice, was the chief decision maker at the IRS regarding the design and implementation of federal tax rulings and enforcement programs for exempt organizations and was a recipient of the IRS Commissioner's Award for exemplary service.

In late March 2010, Clergy Voice sent another letter to the IRS asserting that residents at C Street failed to pay taxes on the allegedly discounted portions of their allegedly below market rents. Clergy Voice stated that a one-bedroom apartment on Capitol Hill would cost at least $1,700, while rent at the C Street house for members has been $950 a month including housekeeping services, and thus the renters should pay income tax on the difference. The group also surveyed the Capitol Hill rental market and found that nearby hotels charge a minimum of $2,400 per month and corporate housing costs a minimum of $4,000 per month. In 2002, the Los Angeles Times reported that C Street charged Senators and Congressional representatives $600 per month for rent. In 2009, WORLD Magazine reported that C Street charged about $950 per month for rent.

On April 1, 2010, Citizens for Responsibility and Ethics in Washington (CREW), a liberal watchdog group, filed a complaint with the Senate and House ethics committees alleging that senators and representatives lodging in C Street received below market rents constituting "improper gifts from C Street Center, Inc., the entity that runs the house and is affiliated with the Fellowship, a shadowy religious organization." The complaint names Sens. Sam Brownback, R-Kan.; Tom Coburn, R-Okla.; Jim DeMint, R-S.C.; and John Ensign, R-Nev., as well as Reps. Michael F. Doyle, D-Pa.; Heath Shuler, D-N.C.; Bart Stupak, D-Mich.; and Zach Wamp, R-Tenn. CREW states that the House and Senate gift rules specifically include "lodging" as a prohibited gift.

On April 1, 2010, Fox News reported that a spokesperson for Coburn said that the CREW complaint was "bogus" and a "witch hunt, " adding that "Anyone who spends 10 minutes on Craigslist will realize they're getting a fair market deal" at $950 rent per month due to the shared nature of the living and bathroom space and "limited" housekeeping service.

On April 8, 2010, Jeff Sharlet, a reporter who had lived as an intern at the Fellowship, stated on The Rachel Maddow Show that C Street is a "luxury place" with a cook, dining room used for formal banquets, and common space "to hang out, to talk policy, to watch sports," adding that female interns act as unpaid maids and that male volunteers for the Fellowship, including himself when he was an intern, are expected to be a "servant for these congressmen."

=== Sex scandals ===
Some of the members of Congress who have resided at the C Street Center have been exposed in sexual scandals, including Nevada Senator John Ensign, South Carolina Governor Mark Sanford, and Representative Chip Pickering.

== See also ==
- Christian fundamentalism
- Christian right
- Radical right (United States)
