= Douglas Coe =

American evangelical (1928-2017)

Douglas Evans Coe
- Born: October 20, 1928; Medford, Oregon, US
- Died: February 21, 2017 (aged 88); Annapolis, Maryland, US
- Education: Willamette University BS (1953)
- Occupations: evangelist (Note: serving under the Fellowship Foundation); Christian lay minister (Note: serving under the Presbyterian Church (USA))
- Known for: affiliation with: Fellowship Foundation National Prayer Breakfast
- Title: Associate Director Fellowship Foundation
- Spouse: Janice Muyskens
- Children: 6
- Relatives: Curtis P. Coe (grandfather); Robert E. Coe Jr. (cousin); Descendants of Robert Coe

Douglas Evans Coe (October 20, 1928 – February 21, 2017) was an American evangelist who served as the associate director of the Fellowship Foundation (also known as The Fellowship), a religious and political organization known for hosting the annual National Prayer Breakfast. Coe has been referred to as the "stealth Billy Graham". In 2005, Coe was named one of the 25 most-influential evangelicals in the United States by Time. Coe was an ordained ruling elder and lay minister in the Presbyterian Church (USA).

== Early life and education ==
Douglas Coe was born on October 20, 1928, in Medford, Oregon. He earned a Bachelor of Science degree from Willamette University in Salem in 1953. He was the son of Milton Evans and Lodi Helene née Davis Coe. His grandfather was professor and missionary Curtis P. Coe. His second cousin was Marion County, Oregon, treasurer Robert E. Coe Jr. who also lived in Salem. They are descendants of American colonial Robert Coe.

While enrolled as a college student, Coe met dean of men and future fellowship associate Senator Mark O. Hatfield. Coe became involved with Young Life, a campus youth ministry, in Salem, Oregon, and started a chapter of InterVarsity Christian Fellowship with Roy Cook while enrolled at Willamette University. Coe and Cook became involved in laymen's groups of various kinds and helped establish a "Navigator house" in Salem. They met Abraham Vereide when he visited Salem, Oregon, for a Governor's prayer breakfast and were fascinated by his visionary communication of a "leadership led by God, empowered by His Spirit."

== Career ==
In 1958, Coe was employed by Vereide at the International Christian Leadership (ICL) on Dupont Circle in Washington, D.C., and served as aide de camp to Vereide. By 1963, Coe had become an assistant director of ICL. He worked alongside Vereide, Wallace Haines, Clifton Robinson and Richard C. Halverson, the clergy executives of the global ministry. Coe was trained by Jim Rayburn and Lorne Sanny in the methods of Bible memorization, study and teaching. Vereide also had Coe mentored by young Billy Graham, a youth minister and former president (1948–1952) of Northwestern College, and a frequent house guest of Vereide's. Halverson called Coe "...the godfather... but for good, not for bad."

Coe was a member of the planning committee for the National Student Leadership Forum on Faith and Values.

=== Political influence and private diplomacy ===
The extent of Coe's influence in American politics is a subject of debate. Speaking at the 1990 National Prayer Breakfast, President George H. W. Bush praised Coe for his "quiet diplomacy, I wouldn't say secret diplomacy".

The Fellowship was a behind-the-scenes player at the Camp David Accords in 1978, working with President Jimmy Carter to issue a worldwide call to prayer with Israeli prime minister Menachem Begin and Egyptian president Anwar Sadat. In 2000, Coe met with top economic officials of Pakistan as a "special envoy" of U. S. Representative Joe Pitts. Coe met with President George H. W. Bush as he hosted a luncheon with Iraq's ambassador to the United States in the mid-1980s. In 2001, The Fellowship helped arrange a private meeting at Cedars between two warring leaders, Democratic Republic of Congo President Joseph Kabila and Rwandan President Paul Kagame, one of the first of a series of discreet meetings between the two African leaders that eventually led to the signing of a peace accord. Coe was a member of the large United States Congressional and ministerial delegation which accompanied then First Lady Hillary Clinton to the 1997 funeral of the founder of the Missionaries of Charity, Mother Teresa. He is mentioned by John Ortberg in his book If You Want to Walk on Water, You've Got to Get Out of the Boat as the pastor of a man, named only as 'Bob', who had great influence on bringing medicine and releasing political prisoners in Kenya. Coe convened a meeting between Bob Mitchell, the president of Young Life, Jay Kesler, the president of Youth for Christ, and Colonel James Meredith of United States Army at Vereide's Fellowship House in Washington, D.C., on July 29, 1980, which led to the formation of Military Community Youth Ministries (MCYM), a global program to spiritually and relationally care for children with parents in the military around the world in the similitude of Young Life and InterVarsity, organizations which Coe had served with early in his ministry career.

In March 2009, Coe was a featured speaker at the Idaho State Prayer Breakfast.

Speakers at the 48th annual Idaho State Prayer Breakfast challenged an audience of more than 600 Saturday to discover Jesus Christ through individual attention, small group fellowships and statewide prayer for leaders.

Former Idaho governor Cecil Andrus introduced Doug Coe. Andrus said the Camp David accords would not have been accomplished without Coe.

Doug Coe told of how people of all cultures and religious backgrounds can be joined by Jesus' teachings. Coe said small group fellowships have taken place all over the world with communists, atheists, Hindus and Muslims agreeing on the teachings of Jesus.

For example, at one small group fellowship meeting, Cecil Andrus asked Arthur Burns, a Jew, to speak. Burns prayed, "Dear God, I pray that all the Jewish people in the world will come to know Jesus. Dear God, I pray that all the Muslims in the world will come to know Jesus. Dear God, I pray that all the Christians in the world will come to know Jesus. Dear God, I pray that everyone in the world will come to know Jesus."

Doug Coe, former Young Life and InterVarsity leader, told Saturday's audience: "That's the message for our kids, for our country. Jesus is the answer."

== Personal life ==
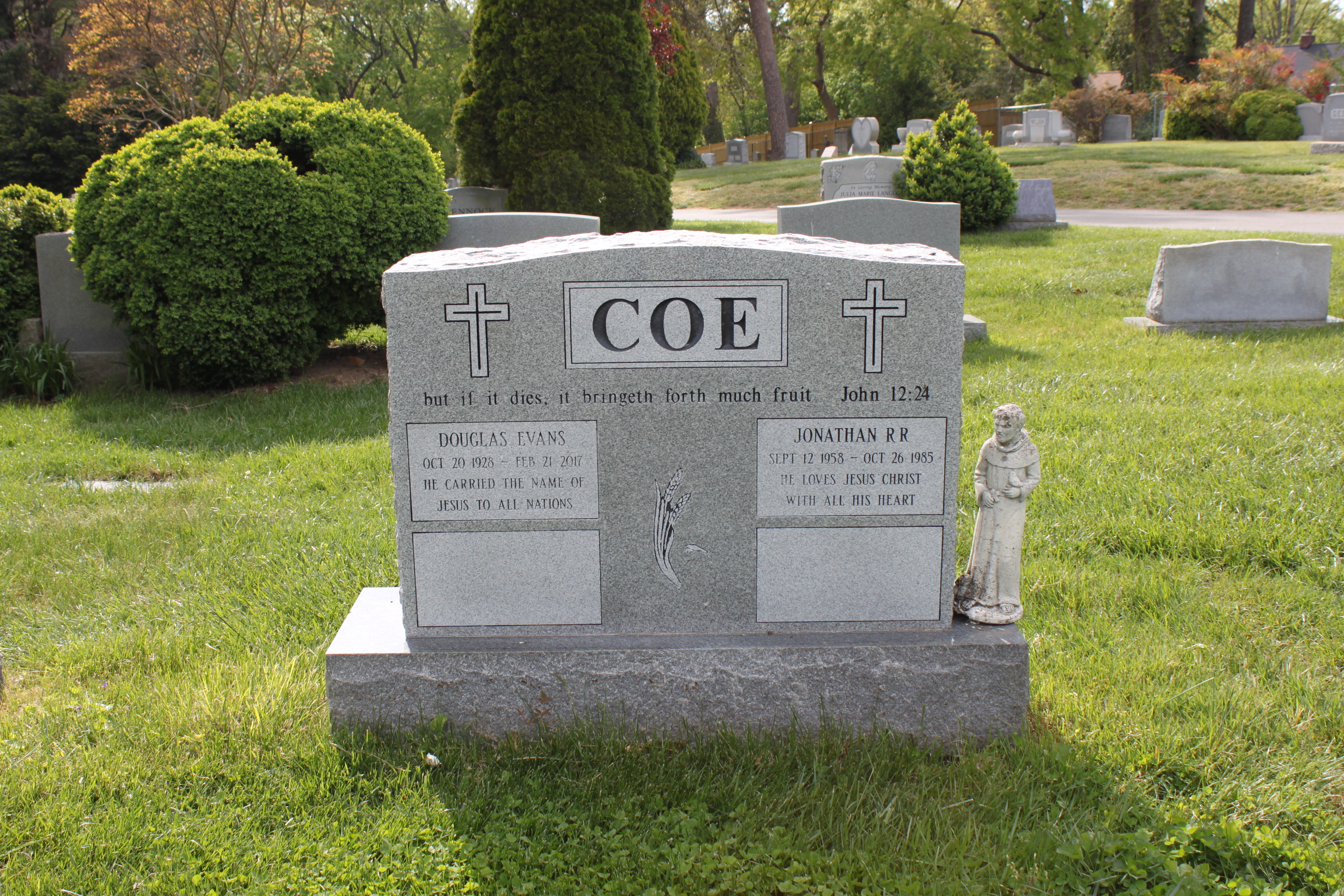
Grave of Coe at Columbia Gardens Cemetery, Arlington, Virginia

When he was not traveling, Coe resided in Arlington, Virginia, with his wife, Janice née Muyskens, in a house located on the grounds of the former Doubleday Mansion, renamed the Cedars. He and his wife had six children, including David, Tim, and Tom, and 21 grandchildren.

Reluctant to speak in public, Coe routinely denied requests for interviews and speeches to large audiences.

Coe died at age 88 in Annapolis, Maryland, on February 21, 2017, from complications of a heart attack.

== Media portrayals ==
In August 2019, Netflix released a five-part, original documentary series titled The Family which features Coe as the central figure of what it describes as "an enigmatic conservative Christian group ... [that] wields enormous influence in Washington, D.C." He is portrayed by James Cromwell. The series is based on the 2008 book The Family: The Secret Fundamentalism at the Heart of American Power by Jeff Sharlet.

In 1978, Coe was portrayed by Ned Wilson in the film, Born Again, concerning his work in converting Charles Colson to Christianity and supporting him through his incarceration following Watergate.
