= D. G. S. Dhinakaran =

Indian evangelist (1935–2008)

- Born: 1 July 1935; Surandai, Tirunelveli district, Madras Presidency, [India]
- Died: 20 February 2008 (aged 72); Chennai, India
- Occupation: Evangelist
- Organization: Jesus Calls Ministries
- Known for: founding Jesus Calls Ministries and Karunya University
- Spouse: Stella Dhinakaran (m.1959-2008)
- Children: 2, including Paul Dhinakaran

Duraisamy Geoffery Samuel Dhinakaran (1 July 1935 – 20 February 2008) was an Indian evangelical preacher. He was the founder of Jesus Calls Prayer Tower and Karunya University.

== Early life ==
Dhinakaran was born on 1 July 1935 at Surandai in Tirunelveli district of Madras Presidency (today Tamil Nadu), British India. He attended St. John's college, Palayamkottai, and received a BSc degree in mathematics from Madras University in 1955.

== Ministry ==
Dhinakaran was involved in evangelical activities for some time prior to leaving his job at the bank in October 1962 to evangelise on a full-time basis. He founded the Jesus Calls Ministries that, by the time of his death, had more than 20 bases in India and abroad and during his lifetime was the most influential and best-known of the Charismatic evangelists working in India. Allan Anderson, an academic specialising in studies of Pentecostalism, sees similarities between Dhinakaran's efforts and those of Oral Roberts in the US.

One of the parallels with Roberts was Dhinakaran's involvement in the establishment of Karunya University, a Christian institution at which he served as the first Chancellor. He also played a significant role in the formation of Seesha, a voluntary body concerned with educating underprivileged children and with assisting rural people.

Dhinakaran, who remained a member of the Church of South India, was among the first Indian Christian leaders to appreciate the potential of television as a medium for evangelism. In doing this he was following a pattern established in the US and challenging the conservative opinions of his peers, who associated television with the perceived moral laxities of the Indian cinema industry. He had been broadcasting his message on radio programmes since 1972, when he had used the FEBA network for that purpose, and the Jesus Calls Ministry began using television broadcasts in the mid-1990s. The broadcasting entity is now sizable and during his lifetime he was assisted in it by his son, Paul Dhinakaran, who subsequently took charge of the Ministry following Dhinakaran's death. The introduction of his son as co-anchor so soon after Roberts had adopted a similar course in the US was, according to Jonathan James, probably not a coincidence. Only a small proportion of the broadcast output was religious in nature and that used devices—such as addressing the audience in a mixture of speech and song. Cultural empathies with the audience were encouraged by predominant use of the local Tamil language rather than alternatives such as English and by recognising local traditions of oral storytelling.

Following methods used in the US, which included building a massive prayer tower in Chennai and others throughout India, were not always appreciated. Dhinakaran presented his television shows wearing Western clothing and he used Western songs and music, as well as addressing his audience in a Western style rather than sitting on the ground as gurus did, all of which evoked some dissatisfaction.

He wrote more than 15 books and recorded many Christian musical albums.

== Death ==
D.G.S Dhinakaran died in hospital on 20 February 2008. He suffered from heart and kidney ailments.
