= Robert E. Coe Jr. =

American politician (1915-2003)

Bob Coe Jr.

Treasurer of Marion County, Oregon
- In office 1960–1979
- Preceded by: Sam J. Butler

Personal details
- Born: Robert Edwin Coe Jr. January 10, 1915 Coats, Kansas
- Died: March 12, 2003 (aged 88) Philomath, Oregon
- Party: Republican Party
- Relatives: Margaret Coe (niece); Karin Clarke (great-niece); Douglas Coe (cousin); Descendants of Robert Coe
- Education: Southwestern College
- Profession: Politician

Robert Edwin Coe Jr. (January 10, 1915 — March 12, 2003), or Bob Coe Jr., was an American politician and entrepreneur in Oregon. He was the treasurer of Marion County, Oregon, for 19 years. After a failed run for county commissioner, he made speculative investments resulting in county losses of $18 million. With his brothers C. Claire and Howard, he owned several prominent businesses in Salem.

== Biography ==
Coe was born in Coats, Kansas, to Mary née Shoemaker and Robert Edwin Coe Sr. He is a descendent of the colonist Robert Coe. The Coe and Shoemaker families were so well known in the region that when Coe's parents married, that the Attica newspaper celebrated their union in 1902, and wrote that the couple was "too well known to need any introduction to the public." He had three sisters and two brothers, Curtis, who went by Claire, and Howard. When he was an infant, Coe's parents entered him into a contest in which doctors examined and rated babies on a scale of 1–100. Coe came in fifth with a score of 94. His second cousin was prominent evangelical Douglas Coe of Salem who was the associate director of the Fellowship Foundation.

Growing up, Coe played the trumpet in his family's band and worked in his father's department store. He attended Coats High School, from which he graduated in 1934. He briefly attended Southwestern College, where he studied Business.

=== Banker and entrepreneur ===
After dropping out of college his freshman year, in 1935, Coe moved to Portland, Oregon, where he worked at JCPenney, before getting a job as a cashier at a bank in Hillsboro.

In 1937, he moved to Tillamook with his sister. There he took a position at Commercial Bank of Tillamook, which eventually was absorbed by U.S. Bancorp, and he become the bank's president. During that time, he served on the Tillamook City Council, was elected president of a Columbia Plateau bankers association, and the first chairman of the agricultural and forestry committee of the Oregon Bankers Association. He then met and married Ethel née Sanders and had two daughters.

In 1955, Coe relocated to Salem, and he and his two brothers opened the first Ironrite dealership in the region, where Claire owned a vacuum cleaner retail business and Howard was the sales manager at a furniture store. The business was extremely successful such that they expanded into radios, televisions, and appliances, opening Modern Appliance Center in 1956. Coe served as the president of the company and the credit manager. In 1957, he became an appraiser for the Marion County Tax Assessor's office.

=== Politician ===
In 1960, Coe challenged incumbent republican Marion County Treasurer Sam J. Butler for the office as the first primary election opposition Butler had in 20 years. Voters frequently confused Coe for Howell Appling Jr. during his campaign because "in print," said the Statesman Journal, the two were indistinguishable. Coe's nomination and subsequent election was "the surprise of the county." Immediately upon taking office, he reduced staff promising to streamline records keeping with IBM computers at a lower cost than a large staff.

A year into office, Coe objected to the county court's proposal in addressing a quarter of a $400,000 deficit in the general road fund Coe inherited from Butler's time in office. He argued the proposal appeared to involve an illegal commingling of funds, which involved borrowing from the general fund without interest to cover the deficit. Coe discovered the road fund had previously purchased a $100,000 government treasury bond that would need to be liquidated prior to taking any loans. The bond had lost value over time and was purchased by Butler without court authorization. After a hearing on the matter, Coe discovered that Butler had used more than $200,000 out of the general fund to pay road fund bills. The District Attorney and judge advised that the only legal way out of the deficit was to transfer the treasury bond into the emergency fund and for the road fund to borrow from it with interest, resolving the issue. A few months later, Coe was selected by the American Cancer Society's Marion-Polk County chapter to run the Cancer Crusade, a charitable cancer fundraising initiative.

During his first few years as treasurer, Coe overhauled the county's handling of cash and investments, which Coe said increased the surplus for the county by more than 2,000% by pooling tax district funds and making short- and long-term investments. The Capital Journal said that Coe's program "greatly improved" the county's financial matters and was popular in the community. In 1964, residents signed a petition to the Republican district committee to select Coe as their candidate for Oregon's 1st congressional district to replace A. Walter Norblad. However, they selected Wendell Wyatt instead. Coe was elected president of the Oregon Association of County Treasurers and Finance Officers in 1966. However, in 1968, the Silverton Elementary School Board began to question Coe's pooling of funds and investments and asked him to attend a school board meeting to explain the program. He refused, instead informing the school board to visit him at the courthouse. When they alleged that Coe was withholding district funds and refusing to credit interest without authorization, he argued that disbursement timelines were long because he was short-staffed.

In the late 1960s, Dale Mallicoat, the relator and director of the Oregon Department of State Lands, sued Coe's office to return unclaimed school bond redemption funds under Oregon's Uniform Disposition of Unclaimed Property Act, which the trial court denied. On appeal in 1969, the Oregon Supreme Court overturned the decision and ruled that the bonds must be turned over to the state, rather than retained by the county, because they remained unclaimed for more than seven years.

When Marion County Commissioner Henry Mattson announced his retirement in 1974, Coe was one of four seeking selection nomination by the republican party. The Capital Journal endorsed a different candidate than Coe. During the election, they again endorsed Walter Heine, while describing Coe as preferred because he was a more liberal, charming, and enthusiastic candidate. To his work as county treasurer, they said that he "must be some kind of wizard at the job." They said that they thought Heine was more reliable and easier to talk to, referring to Coe as "a walking communication problem." Heine was elected.

More than a year after the election, Coe sued the parent company of The Capital Journal and the Statesman Journal because they had mistakenly mis-captioned his photo as another candidate's name, who had been previously identified as a "convicted embezzler" who "had a criminal record." Coe alleged in the lawsuit that the newspapers implied that he had been convicted of a crime, which damaged his reputation the day of the election. He sought damages of $203,275. His lawsuit was dismissed because he had failed to file the lawsuit within the statute of limitations. He appealed the decision, which was upheld by the Oregon Supreme Court in 1977.

Coe drew criticism from the public in 1977 over the recovery of lost child support payments. An investigation by the Statesman Journal found that Coe was the only treasurer to convert the disbursed payments from negotiable checks to a warrant-based system. He argued that child support payments were public funds that should earn interest so that the county could earn revenues on them. In doing so, they were placed under the public funds recovery laws which created stringent red tape for recovering lost or stolen payments. A woman whose payment was lost argued that Coe did not care about the best interest of his constituents and a state child enforcement officer pointed out that counties using negotiable checks have funds replaced immediately because they are insured by the Federal Deposit Insurance Corporation. Later that year, Coe asked for a 33% raise in 1977, the largest raise ever requested in the county.

Coe retired in 1979 and after his wife died, moved to Santa Clara, California, and remarried. After the death of his second wife, he moved to Philomath, Oregon, where his daughter lived. He died in 2003.

== Marion County financial crisis ==
As part of Coe's investment pool program for Marion County, he purchased Federal National Mortgage Association (FNMA, also "Fannie Mae") and Government National Mortgage Association (GNMA, also "Ginnie Mae") bonds backed by the United States Department of the Treasury. He was the first Oregon finance official to do so, initially resulting in large increases on returns for tax revenues. By the mid 1970s, the program was returning more than $100,000 monthly in interest gains, including more than $1.5 million in 1973.

After his failed run for county commissioner, and for the two years up until his retirement, Coe committed the county to purchase $50 million in GNMA bonds. The values of the bonds plummeted, resulting in an $18 million loss for the county. When Ralph Grim was appointed interim county treasurer, he discovered the investment losses and announced them shortly afterward. He blamed the federal funds rate for the loss. Coe was aware of the loss by October 1979, just before he announced his retirement. Attorney General James A. Redden said that the purchase of the bonds was illegal. Coe was named as a defendant in two lawsuits for making illegal commitments of the county's investment pool to GNMA bonds and blamed by dozens of local and state officials for engaging in "poor and unusual investment judgement" which were referred to as "speculative" and "gambles." The lawsuits were settled out-of-court.

After the news broke, Coe traveled to a trailer park in Yuma, Arizona, becoming difficult to locate and avoiding commenting on the bonds and lawsuits. Alan Guggenheim, a reporter for the Statesman Journal tracked him down to ask him to explain the investments he made during the last two years of his term. Coe refused to talk, pretended to be someone else, and threatened to call the manager. The city of Salem and the groups whose funds were invested in the pool sued the county treasurer's office the same month. A decree spread the losses among 85 Marion county taxing districts, which was upheld by the Oregon Superior Court in 1981. The Statesman Journal ultimately blamed the "disaster" on the county commissioners and the media for not questioning Coe's investments during his tenure.

In 1982, 29 districts sued Coe, the county, and the commissioners for $3.5 million in losses. The county agreed to pay the districts back in installments with interest over the course of the subsequent two years.

After many years of effort in cleanup, with Grim as treasurer, the county won an award for Excellence in Financial Reporting in 1987.
