= Peter Manseau =

American writer, religion scholar and museum curator

Peter Manseau is an American writer, religion scholar and museum curator. He is Lilly Endowment Curator of American Religious History at the National Museum of American History, the Smithsonian.

== Early life ==
Manseau attended college at the University of Massachusetts, then earned his master's degree and doctorate from Georgetown University.

== Career ==
Writing in The National Interest, Ivan Plis describes Manseau as an "unusual man for the job" at National Museum of American History, contrasting Manseau's webzine Killing the Buddha, a self-described “religion magazine for people made anxious by churches,” and what Plis describes as Manseau's attraction "to the bizarre and sometimes discomforting ways in which religion makes us behave", with the museum's "musty reputation as 'America’s attic.'” Manseau's 2017 illustrated collection Objects of Devotion: Religion in Early America, which accompanied the museum's first religion-oriented exhibit, received a starred review from Publishers Weekly, which called the book "a wonderful, inspiring collection."

Manseau wrote a memoir entitled Vows, about his mother, a former Catholic nun, and father, a former Catholic priest.

In 2008 Manseau won the National Jewish Book Award and in 2009 the Sophie Brody Award for his debut novel, Songs for the Butcher's Daughter. Speaking about the novel, in which Yiddish features significantly, Manseau told The New Yorker, "Though most of my writing is about religion in one way or another, that’s my real interest: language—the ways in which religious identities are shaped by the languages we use to talk about them."

== Bibliography ==
- Killing the Buddha: A Heretic's Bible, coauthored with Jeff Sharlet. 2004 Free Press ISBN 0-7432-3276-3
- Vows: The Story of a Priest, a Nun, and Their Son, 2005 Free Press
- Songs for the Butcher's Daughter: A Novel, 2008 Free Press
- Believer, Beware: First-Person Dispatches from the Margins of Faith, 2009 Beacon Press. Co-edited with Jeff Sharlet. ISBN 0-8070-7739-9
- Rag and Bone: A Journey Among the World's Holy Dead, 2009 Henry Holt and Company
- One Nation Under Gods: A New American History, 2015 Little, Brown and Company
- Melancholy Accidents: Three Centuries of Stray Bullets and Bad Luck, 2016 Melville House Publishing
- Objects of Devotion: Religion in Early America, 2017 Smithsonian Books
- The Apparitionists: A Tale of Phantoms, Fraud, Photography, and the Man Who Captured Lincoln's Ghost, 2017 Houghton Mifflin Harcourt
- The Jefferson Bible: A Biography, 2020 Princeton University Press
- The Maiden of All Our Desires: A Novel, 2022 Arcade Publishing
- Discovery and Revelation: Religion, Science, and Making Sense of Things, 2022. Coauthored with Andrew Ali Aghapour. Smithsonian Books
