= The Undertow: Scenes from a Slow Civil War =

American political book

- Author: Jeff Sharlet
- Language: English
- Publisher: W. W. Norton & Company
- Publication date: March 21, 2023
- Publication place: United States
- Media type: Print; e-book; audiobook
- Pages: 352
- ISBN: 978-1-324-00649-7

The Undertow: Scenes from a Slow Civil War (2023) is a book on American politics by Jeff Sharlet, author of The Family: The Secret Fundamentalism at the Heart of American Power.

It documents the rise of far-right politics within the Republican Party under Donald Trump – in particular the Make America Great Again (MAGA) movement and "militant Trumpism" – which he regards as fascist and white supremacist, as well as combining religion and politics (for example, in viewing Ashli Babbitt as a martyr for the cause).
