= Public Access to Public Science Act =

Creating Public Access to Public Science
- Long title: A bill to ensure public access to published materials concerning scientific research and development activities funded by Federal science agencies.
- Acronyms (colloquial): PAPS

The Public Access to Public Science (PAPs) public access to research funded by specific Federal agencies under the jurisdiction of the House Science committee, including National Aeronautics and Space Administration (NASA), the National Science Foundation (NSF), the National Institute of Standards and Technology (NIST) and the National Weather Service (NWS). The Bill was introduced to the 113th Congress by Congressman Jim Sensenbrenner (R.-WI.) and Congresswoman Eddie Bernice Johnson (D-TX) and was referred to the Subcommittee on Research and Technology December 13, 2013. It has been endorsed by the Association of Public and Land-grant Universities (APLU) and the Association of American Universities (AAU).

The bill is often compared to and discussed in conjunction with the Fair Access to Science and Technology Research Act (FASTR) bill, also introduced in 2013.
