= Fair Access to Science and Technology Research Act =

- Long title: A bill to provide for Federal agencies to develop public access policies relating to research conducted by employees of that agency or from funds administered by that agency.
- Acronyms (colloquial): FASTR

The Fair Access to Science and Technology Research Act (FASTR) is a bill in the United States that would mandate earlier public release of taxpayer-funded research. The bill has been introduced in 2013, 2015, and 2017. Sen. Ron Wyden (D-Ore.) and Sen. John Cornyn (R-Texas) introduced the Senate version, while the bill was introduced to the House by Reps. Zoe Lofgren (D-Calif.), Mike Doyle (D-Penn.) and Kevin Yoder (R-Kans.). The bill is a successor to the Federal Research Public Access Act (FRPAA), which had been introduced in 2006, 2010, and 2012.

Senator Wyden advocated for the passage of the bill by arguing that "taxpayer funded research should never be hidden behind a paywall."

FASTR has been described as "The Other Aaron's Law", named for open-access activist Aaron Swartz who died in a dramatic case in support of open access research in January 2013.

The Senate Committee on Homeland Security and Governmental Affairs unanimously approved the bill on July 29, 2015. It was the first time that the bill or any of its predecessors had gained committee approval and been forwarded to a full house of Congress.

The bill is often compared to and discussed in conjunction with the Public Access to Public Science (PAPS) Act, also introduced in 2013.

As of 2024 the bill has not been enacted, partially due to lobbying by anti-open access publishers and trade groups such as Elsevier and the Association of American Publishers.

== Executive action ==
Days after FASTR was introduced in 2013, the Executive Branch's Office of Science and Technology Policy (OSTP) issued a memorandum that "hereby directs each Federal agency with over $100 million in annual conduct of research and development expenditures to develop a plan to support increased public access to the results of research funded by the Federal Government." The change was in part prompted by an online Whitehouse petition to "Require free access over the Internet to scientific journal articles arising from taxpayer-funded research."

== See also ==
- Open access
- Academic journal publishing reform
- Serials crisis
- Open, Public, Electronic and Necessary Government Data Act (OPEN)
