= Karunya Institute of Technology and Sciences =

Private university in Tamil Nadu, India

Karunya Institute Of Technology And Sciences
- Former name: Karunya University
- Motto: Arise And Shine
- Type: Private deemed university
- Established: 1986; 40 years ago
- Founders: Dr D.G.S. Dhinakaran, Dr Paul Dhinakaran
- Accreditation: UGC, NAAC
- Chancellor: Dr Paul Dhinakaran
- Vice-Chancellor: Dr Elijah Blessing
- Location: Coimbatore, Tamil Nadu, India; 10°56′19″N 76°44′48″E
- Campus: Rural
- Website: karunya.edu

Karunya Institute of Technology and Sciences, formerly Karunya University, is a private deemed university in Coimbatore, Tamil Nadu, India. It was founded by D. G. S. Dhinakaran and his son Paul Dhinakaran.

== Accreditation ==
Karunya University was accredited in 2022 by the National Assessment and Accreditation Council (NAAC) with an "A++" grade.
