= Autism CARES Act of 2014 =

US law

Autism Collaboration, Accountability, Research, Education, and Support Act of 2014
- Long title: To reauthorize certain provisions of the Public Health Service Act relating to autism, and for other purposes.
- Acronyms (colloquial): Autism CARES Act of 2014
- Announced in: the 113th United States Congress
- Sponsored by: Rep. Christopher H. Smith (R, NJ-4)
- Number of co-sponsors: 34

Citations
- Public law: Pub. L. 113–157 (text) (PDF)

Codification
- Titles amended: 42 U.S.C.: Public Health and Social Welfare
- U.S.C. sections affected: 42 U.S.C. § 280i–2, 42 U.S.C. § 280i–3, 42 U.S.C. § 280i et seq., 42 U.S.C. § 280i–4, 42 U.S.C. § 280i, and others.
- Agencies affected: United States Department of Justice, Government Accountability Office, Health Resources and Services Administration, Administration for Children and Families, Centers for Disease Control and Prevention, Centers for Medicare and Medicaid Services, United States Department of Labor, United States Congress, United States Department of Transportation, United States Department of Education, Department of Health and Human Services, Department of Housing and Urban Development
- Authorizations of appropriations: $260,000,000 for each of fiscal years 2015, 2016, 2017, 2018 and 2019, for a total of $1,300,000,000

Legislative history
- Introduced in the House as H.R. 4631 by Rep. Christopher H. Smith (R, NJ-4) on May 9, 2014; Committee consideration by United States House Committee on Energy and Commerce, United States House Energy Subcommittee on Health; Passed the House on June 24, 2014 (voice vote); Passed the Senate on July 31, 2014 (Unanimous consent); Signed into law by President Barack Obama on August 8, 2014

The Combating Autism Reauthorization Act of 2014 or Autism Collaboration, Accountability, Research, Education, and Support Act of 2014 or Autism CARES Act of 2014 (H.R. 4631; Pub. L. 113–157 (text) (PDF)) is a United States federal law that amended the Public Health Service Act to reauthorize research, surveillance, and education activities related to autism spectrum disorders (autism) conducted by various agencies within the United States Department of Health and Human Services (HHS). The bill authorizes $1.3 billion in funding for fiscal years 2015–2019.

The bill was introduced and passed in the United States House of Representatives during the 113th United States Congress. On August 8, 2014, President Barack Obama signed the bill into law. The program and funding was once again reauthorized in 2019 with revisions.

== Background ==
Autism spectrum disorder is a neurodevelopmental disorder defined in the fifth revision of the American Psychiatric Association's Diagnostic and Statistical Manual of Mental Disorders 5th edition (DSM-5). It is characterized by social deficits and communication difficulties, stereotyped or repetitive behaviors and interests, and in some cases, cognitive delays.

A Centers for Disease Control and Prevention study found that 1 in every 59 American children are autistic.

The first federal autism research programs were created by the Autism Statistics, Surveillance, Research and Epidemiology Act (Pub. L. 106–310 (text) (PDF)).

== Provisions of the law ==
The law reauthorizes for five years existing federal autism research and assistance programs that would otherwise expire on October 1, 2014.

The law requires the Secretary of Health and Human Services to assign a deputy to be in charge of organizing and monitoring all federal research and autism services to ensure that they do not overlap and duplicate each other. This provision was written in reaction to a "Government Accountability Office finding last year that 84 percent of current autism research projects have potential to overlap."

== Congressional Budget Office report ==
This summary is based largely on the summary provided by the Congressional Budget Office, as ordered reported by the House Committee on Energy and Commerce on June 10, 2014 and then revised on June 20, 2014 to correct an error in the previous estimate. This is a public domain source.

The law amends the Public Health Service Act to reauthorize research, surveillance, and education activities related to autism spectrum disorders (autism) conducted by various agencies within the United States Department of Health and Human Services (HHS). Those activities are conducted by the Centers for Disease Control and Prevention, the Health Resources and Services Administration, and the National Institutes of Health.

The law authorizes appropriations for autism activities at HHS of $260 million in 2015 and $1.3 billion over the 2015–2019 period. The Congressional Budget Office (CBO) estimates that it would cost $1.1 billion over the 2015–2019 period, assuming appropriation of the authorized amounts. Pay-as-you-go procedures do not apply to this legislation because it would not affect direct spending or revenues.

The law contains no intergovernmental or private-sector mandates as defined in the Unfunded Mandates Reform Act.

== Procedural history ==
The Combating Autism Reauthorization Act of 2014 was introduced into the United States House of Representatives on May 9, 2014, by Rep. Christopher H. Smith (R, NJ-4). It was referred to the United States House Committee on Energy and Commerce and the United States House Energy Subcommittee on Health. It was reported (amended) alongside House Report 113–490 on June 23, 2014, with a title change to "Autism Collaboration, Accountability, Research, Education, and Support Act of 2014". On June 24, 2014, the House voted to pass the bill in a voice vote. The United States Senate voted with unanimous consent to pass the bill on July 31, 2014. President Barack Obama signed the bill into law on August 8, 2014.

== Debate and discussion ==
Rep. Michael F. Doyle (D-PA), who co-sponsored the bill, said that "every time new data is realized on autism spectrum disorders, the numbers become more and more troubling... this is why passage of the Autism Cares Act today is so important to continue research into the causes of autism."

Rep. Chris Smith, who introduced the bill, argued that "this is a critical investment that is working to determine the cause of ASD, identify autistic children as early as possible to begin treatment, and producing better awareness, new therapies and effective services. The quality of life of many children is at stake, as it is with young adults who age out of the support services in educational systems."

Liz Feld, the President of Autism Speaks, spoke in favor of the bill saying that the group "commends Representatives Smith and Doyle for their bipartisan leadership in spearheading this more aggressive federal response to autism." The Autism Society of America also supported the bill.

Rep. Bill Posey (R-FL) wrote an op-ed in The Hill arguing that the bill needed to be rewritten and improved. Posey argued that, after a federal program spent eight years and $1.7 billion trying to address the autism crisis and failed to do so, Washington was "on a path to rush through a five-year reauthorization, raise spending 20 percent and hope for better results without addressing fundamental structural flaws in the current program." According to Posey, one flaw with the current system is that while the Interagency Autism Coordinating Committee is charged with writing a strategic plan for organizing the research and spending on autism, the federal government ignores that strategy to have the National Institutes of Health instead, resulting in money being spend in a disjointed manner. Posey argued that he would like to take the time to improve this bill, possibly using some of the improvements suggested by the Autism Reform Policy Coalition, instead of moving forward too hastily with this bill.

== Reauthorization in 2019 ==
In 2019, H.R. 1058, the Autism CARES Act of 2019 (a.k.a. the Autism Collaboration, Accountability, Research, Education, and Support Act of 2019 or the Autism CARES Act of 2019 Autism Collaboration, Accountability, Research, Education, and Support Act of 2019) once again reauthorized the program and funding. Specifically, the bill reauthorized provisions relating to expanded ASD research at the National Institutes of Health; the collection of state-level ASD data by the Centers for Disease Control and Prevention; ASD education, early detection, and intervention activities supported by the Health Resources and Services Administration; and the Interagency Autism Coordinating Committee.

The bill also generally revises the scope of those programs and activities to encompass ASD individuals of all ages, rather than only youth; focus funding on programs in areas with a shortage of personal health services; and reduce health-outcome disparities across diverse populations.

== See also ==
- List of bills in the 113th United States Congress
