= Jesus Calls =

Indian Christian ministry

Jesus Calls Prayer Tower is a global humanitarian, non profit, philanthropic and Christian ministry, founded by D. G. S. Dhinakaran and Paul Dhinakaran, headquartered in Chennai and having branches globally. The organization operates as a non-profit entity with a mission to provide comfort, peace, and healing through prayer. This mission is facilitated through channels including physical prayer towers, prayer outreaches, public meetings, television programs, and digital platforms.

Jesus Calls has 104 prayer towers in India, United States, Israel, Malaysia, Singapore, Europe, UK, New Zealand, Canada, Sri Lanka, South Africa, and other countries.

== History ==
The Jesus Calls Prayer Tower is a network of prayer facilities operated by the Jesus Calls ministry, which was founded by D.G.S. Dhinakaran in the year 1967. The prayer towers are designed to provide a place for individuals to seek spiritual support, help and prayer. The network aims to offer assistance to people in distress seeking prayer, counselling for various issues. The facilities include prayer support, charitable work, and spiritual guidance. The Prayer Towers typically offer services such as prayer counseling and spiritual advice, and they are staffed by individuals trained in providing prayer support. The Jesus Calls Prayer Tower network is present in locations across different countries. Each Prayer Tower operates under the oversight of the central organization, which coordinates activities and resources for the each prayer tower.

In 1962, at the age of 27, D.G.S. Dhinakaran experienced a significant spiritual event during a period of personal crisis involving poverty, sickness, and unemployment. At that time, he encountered his uncle, who introduced him to the teachings of Jesus Christ.

Subsequently, Dhinakaran reported having a vision of Jesus Christ that lasted three hours. During this vision, he felt a profound sense of God's love and compassion, which inspired him to establish the Jesus Calls ministry. He had been suffering from heart and kidney ailments. The Dhinakaran family experienced additional hardships, including the tragic loss of their daughter, Evangeline, in a car accident at the age of 17. These experiences shaped the mission of the Jesus Calls ministry.

The family initiated public services in 1970, with their first public Prayer Festival held in Vellore. The name "Jesus Calls" was adopted for the ministry in 1972, following a Prayer Festival organized in the city of Erode, Tamil Nadu.

In 1980, Paul Dhinakaran joined his parents in ministry.
