= The Family: The Secret Fundamentalism at the Heart of American Power =

Book by Jeff Sharlet

- First edition
- Author: Jeff Sharlet
- Language: English
- Subject: Political power of the Christian Right
- Publisher: HarperCollins
- Publication date: May 20, 2008
- Publication place: United States
- Media type: Print (hardcover)
- Pages: 464
- ISBN: 978-0-06-055979-3
- OCLC: 148887452

The Family: The Secret Fundamentalism at the Heart of American Power is a 2008 book by American journalist Jeff Sharlet. The book investigates the political power of The Family or The Fellowship, a secretive fundamentalist Christian association led by Douglas Coe. Sharlet has said that the organization fetishizes power by comparing Jesus to "Lenin, Ho Chi Minh, Bin Laden" as examples of leaders who change the world through the strength of the covenants they had forged with their "brothers". It was published by HarperCollins.

One year after the book's initial publication, the sex scandals of prominent members of the Family, Nevada Senator John Ensign and South Carolina Governor Mark Sanford, as well as accusations that the Family was illegally subsidizing the rent of members of Congress and involved in the Uganda Anti-Homosexuality Bill, which would have imposed the death penalty for homosexuality in Uganda, thrust the notoriously secretive organization into the national spotlight.

== Beliefs and theology ==
Sharlet did intensive research in the Fellowship's archives, before they were closed to the public. He also spent a month in 2002 living in a Fellowship house near Washington, DC, and wrote a magazine article describing his experiences. In his 2008 book about the Family, he criticized their theology as an "elite fundamentalism" that fetishizes political power and wealth, consistently opposes labor movements in the U.S. and abroad, and teaches that laissez-faire economic policy is "God's will." He criticized their theology of instant forgiveness for powerful men as providing a convenient excuse for elites who commit misdeeds or crimes, allowing them to avoid accepting responsibility or accountability for their actions.

== Controversial leadership model ==
Sharlet and Andrea Mitchell have described Fellowship leader Doug Coe as preaching a leadership model and a personal commitment to Jesus Christ comparable to the blind devotion that Adolf Hitler, Joseph Stalin, Mao Zedong, and Pol Pot demanded from their followers. In one videotaped lecture series in 1989, Coe said:

Hitler, Goebbels and Himmler were three men. Think of the immense power these three men had... But they bound themselves together in an agreement... Two years before they moved into Poland, these three men had... systematically a plan drawn out... to annihilate the entire Polish population and destroy by numbers every single house... every single building in Warsaw and then to start on the rest of Poland."

Coe adds that it worked; they killed six and a half million "Polish people". Though he calls Nazis "these enemies of ours", he compares their commitment to Jesus's demands: "Jesus said, ‘You have to put me before other people. And you have to put me before yourself.'" Hitler's demands (Coe argues), in order to be in the Nazi party, were similar; that is, you have to put the Nazi party and its objectives ahead of your own life and ahead of other people.

Coe also compared Jesus's teachings to the Red Guard during the Chinese Cultural Revolution:

I’ve seen pictures of young men in the Red Guard of China... they would bring in this young man’s mother and father, lay her on the table with a basket on the end, he would take an axe and cut her head off... They have to put the purposes of the Red Guard ahead of the mother-father-brother-sister – their own life! That was a covenant. A pledge. That was what Jesus said.

Sharlet told NBC News that when he was an intern with the Fellowship, "we were being taught the leadership lessons of Hitler, Lenin and Mao" and that Hitler's genocide "wasn't an issue for them, it was the strength that he emulated."

== Reception ==
Sharlet's book was endorsed by several commentators, including Frank Schaeffer, once a leading figure of the Christian right, who called Sharlet's book a "must read ... disturbing tour de force," and Brian McLaren, one of Time"s "25 most influential evangelicals" in the U.S., who said: “Jeff Sharlet [is] a confessed non-evangelical whom top evangelical organizations might be wise to hire—and quick—as a consultant."

Lisa Miller, who writes a column on religion at Newsweek, called his book "alarmist" and says it paints a "creepy, even cultish picture" of the young, lower-ranking members of the Fellowship.

On August 9, 2019, an original documentary series was released on Netflix based on the book, titled The Family.
