= Abraham Vereide =

Norwegian-born American Methodist minister (1886–1969)

- Vereide at the 1960 National Prayer Breakfast
- Born: October 7, 1886; Gloppen, Norway
- Died: May 16, 1969 (aged 82); Silver Spring, Maryland, U.S.
- Occupation: Minister
- Known for: Founder of The Fellowship
- Spouse: Mattie Hansen

Abraham Vereide (October 7, 1886 – May 16, 1969) was a Norwegian-born American Methodist minister and founder of International Christian Leadership (ICL) group.

== Early life ==
Abraham was born in the Vereide home in Gloppen Municipality in the Nordfjord district of Norway on October 7, 1886, to Anders and Helene Vereide. He had four older sisters. Helene died when Abraham was eight years old.

== Career ==
In 1905 Vereide received a ticket to the United States from a neighbor who was unable to use it. He traveled to Montana and found ore mining work. Vereide became an itinerant minister at the age of 20, covering an area of 70 mi (110 km). Later, he studied at a seminary in Evanston, Illinois.

Vereide was first assigned to Spokane, Washington by the Methodist church. He was later assigned to Portland, Oregon and Seattle in 1916, where he started a local chapter of Goodwill Industries. On personal invitation from then-Governor Franklin D. Roosevelt, he attended a conference regarding the social relief program for New York.

Vereide's main form of proselytism consisted in organizing the prayer breakfast movement across the United States for political leaders and businessmen. This movement led to the yearly National Prayer Breakfast. In April 1935, he founded The Fellowship, in opposition to Roosevelt's New Deal. In 1942 he moved his operation to Washington, DC.

In 1944, International Christian Leadership began in Washington, D.C. Vereide was the executive director of this organization until his death in 1969. He was part of a peace conference in San Francisco after World War II. In 1953, Vereide and the Fellowship started the Presidential Prayer Breakfast, later called the National Prayer Breakfast or the International Prayer Breakfast. He was editor for "The Christian Citizen" together with Leonard Larsen.

== Personal life ==
Around 1905, at a tent meeting that came to town, Vereide met his future wife, Mattie Hansen, the daughter of a Danish pastor. They married in 1910. He and Mattie had one daughter, Alicia, and three sons, Warren, Milton, and Abraham. The family moved to Boston, Massachusetts in 1931.

Vereide died in Silver Spring, Maryland on May 16, 1969.
