= The Fellowship (Christian organization) =

US-based religious organization

Coordinates: 38°54′04″N 77°05′11″W

Fellowship Foundation
- Nickname: The Family
- Formation: April 1935 (91 years ago)
- Founder: Abraham Vereide
- Founded at: Seattle, Washington
- Type: Nonprofit
- Tax ID no.: 53-0204604
- Legal status: 501(c)(3)
- Headquarters: 2145 N 24th St; Arlington, Virginia 22207-4960; United States
- President: Katherine Crane
- Associate Director: Douglas Coe (deceased)
- Key people: Richard Christian Halverson former Executive Director; Senator Harold Everett Hughes former President; Doug Burleigh
- Affiliations: Christians in Congress
- Revenue: $9,687,514 (2020)
- Expenses: $10,392,191 (2020)
- Website: www.fellowshipfnd.com

The Fellowship (incorporated as Fellowship Foundation and doing business as the International Foundation), also known as The Family, is an American-based nonprofit religious and political organization founded in April 1935 by Abraham Vereide. The stated purpose of The Fellowship is to provide a fellowship forum where decision makers can attend Bible studies, attend prayer meetings, worship God, experience spiritual affirmation and receive support.

The Fellowship has been described as one of the most politically well-connected and one of the most secretly funded ministries in the United States. It shuns publicity and its members share a vow of secrecy. The Fellowship's former leader, the late Douglas Coe, and others have justified the organization's desire for secrecy by citing biblical admonitions against public displays of good works, insisting that they would not be able to tackle diplomatically sensitive missions if they drew public attention.

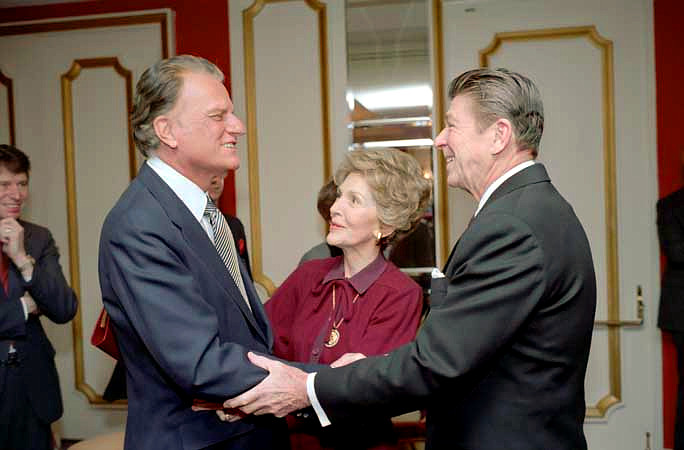
President Ronald Reagan and Nancy Reagan greet Billy Graham at the National Prayer Breakfast in 1981.

Until 2023, The Fellowship held one regular public event each year, the National Prayer Breakfast, which is in Washington, D.C. Each sitting United States president since Dwight D. Eisenhower has participated in at least one National Prayer Breakfast during his term in office.

The group's known participants include ranking United States government officials, corporate executives, heads of religious and humanitarian aid organizations, and ambassadors and high-ranking politicians from across the world. Many United States senators and congressmen have publicly acknowledged working with the Fellowship or are documented as having worked together to pass or influence legislation.

Doug Burleigh is a key figure in the organization and has taken over organizing the National Prayer Breakfast since the death of his father-in-law, Doug Coe. The current president of the organization is Katherine Crane.

In 2009, Lisa Miller wrote in Newsweek that rather than calling themselves "Christians", as they describe themselves, they are brought together by common love for the teachings of Jesus and that all approaches to "loving Jesus" are acceptable.

== History ==
The Fellowship Foundation traces its roots to Abraham Vereide, a Methodist clergyman and social innovator, who organized a month of prayer meetings in 1934 in San Francisco. The Fellowship was founded in 1935 in opposition to President Franklin D. Roosevelt's New Deal. His work spread down the West Coast and eventually to Boston.

The author Jeff Sharlet described the beginning of the Family as a reaction to union activities of Harry Bridges, "The Family really begins when the founder (Abraham Vereide) has this vision, which he thinks comes from God, that Harry Bridges, this Australian labour organiser who organised really the biggest strike in American history, a very successful strike, is a Satanic and Soviet agent."

In April 1935, Vereide and Major J.F. Douglas invited 19 business and civic leaders for a prayer breakfast meeting. By 1937, 209 prayer breakfast groups had been organized throughout Seattle. In 1940, 300 men from all over the state of Washington attended a prayer breakfast for the new governor, Arthur Langlie. Vereide traveled throughout the Pacific Northwest, and later around the country, to develop similar groups. The non-denominational groups were meant to informally bring together civic and business leaders to share vision, study the Bible and develop relationships of trust and support.

The Fellowship Foundation was incorporated by Abraham Vereide in Chicago in 1942 as Fellowship Foundation, Inc. It also acquired the names International Christian Leadership (ICL), Fellowship House, and International Foundation for venues as its global outreach ministry expanded. The Fellowship Foundation, Inc. does most of its business as the International Foundation.

By 1942 there were 60 breakfast groups in major cities around the US and Canada, including Chicago, Los Angeles, Minneapolis, New York, Philadelphia, San Francisco, Washington and Vancouver. That same year, Vereide began to hold small prayer breakfasts for members of the U.S. House of Representatives and the U.S. Senate.

The Fellowship in Chicago, Illinois was Vereide's center of national outreach to businessmen and civic and clergy leadership. Vereide had moved the group's offices from Seattle to the more centralized location of Chicago, headquarters of the businessmen's luncheon outreach "Christian Businessmen's Committee", which Vereide led with industrialist C.B. Hedstrom. That same year the Fellowship Foundation established a delegation ministry in Washington DC on Massachusetts Avenue at Sheridan Circle named "Fellowship House". Vereide later described it as the nerve center of the breakfast groups.

In 1944, Vereide held his first joint Senate–House prayer breakfast meeting. In 1946, he wrote a book with Reverend John G. Magee, chaplain to President Harry Truman, entitled Together (Abingdon Cokesbury). In the book, Vereide explained his philosophy of visionary discipleship and gathering together in what he termed spiritual cells:

Man craves fellowship. Most of us want an opportunity to make our feelings known, to relate our personal experiences, to compare notes with others, and, in unity of spirit to receive renewal, inspiration, guidance, and strength from God. Such groups as we are thinking of have characterized every spiritual awakening. Jesus began with Peter and James and John. He had the twelve and the Seventy. At Bethany he established a cell... there you have the formula... faith embodied the same close informal fellowship... one common practice—gathering together in the name of Jesus.

In January 1947, a conference in Zurich led to the formation of the International Council for Christian Leadership (ICCL), an umbrella group for the national fellowship groups in the United States, Canada, Great Britain, Norway, Hungary, Egypt and China. ICCL, which on its website describes itself as "a relational network of leaders that came into existence through a sovereign act of God", was incorporated as a separate organization in 1953. ICL and ICCL were governed by different boards of directors, joined by a coordinating committee: four members of ICCL's board and four from the ICL's executive committee.

In 1953, President Dwight D. Eisenhower attended the Senate Prayer Breakfast Group. He was invited by fellow Kansan Frank Carlson. By that time, Vereide's congressional members also included senators Frank Carlson, Karl Mundt, Everett Dirksen and Strom Thurmond.

By 1957, ICL had established 125 groups in 100 cities, with 16 groups in Washington, D.C. alone. It had set up another 125 groups in other countries. During 1958, a mentor from The Navigators, Douglas Coe, joined Vereide as assistant executive director of ICL in Washington, D.C. After over 35 years of leading the Fellowship Foundation, Vereide died in 1969 and was succeeded by Richard C. Halverson as executive director. Halverson and Coe worked side by side until Halverson's death in 1995.

The organization was profiled in the 2019 Netflix documentary series The Family based on a book by Jeff Sharlet.

== Influence ==
D. Michael Lindsay, a former Rice University sociologist who studies the evangelical movement, said "there is no other organization like the Fellowship, especially among religious groups, in terms of its access or clout among the country's leadership." He also reported that lawmakers mentioned the Fellowship more than any other organization when asked to name a ministry with the most influence on their faith. Lindsay interviewed 360 evangelical elites, among whom "One in three mentioned [Doug] Coe or the Fellowship as an important influence." Lindsay reported that it "has relationships with pretty much every world leader—good and bad—and there are not many organizations in the world that can claim that."

In 1977, four years after he became an evangelical Christian and later Fellowship member, Watergate conspirator Charles Colson described the group as a "veritable underground of Christ's men all through the U.S. government."

Former Kansas governor Sam Brownback, also a former member of the Senate Prayer Group, has described Fellowship members' method of operation: "Typically, one person grows desirous of pursuing an action"—a piece of legislation, a diplomatic strategy—"and the others pull in behind."

Rob Schenck, founder of the Washington, D.C. ministry Faith and Action in the Nation's Capital, described the Family's influence as "off the charts" in comparison with other fundamentalist groups, specifically compared to Focus on the Family, Pat Robertson, Gary Bauer, Traditional Values Coalition, and Prison Fellowship. (These last two are associated with the Family: Traditional Values Coalition uses their C Street Center and Prison Fellowship was founded by Colson.) Schenck also says that "the mystique of the Fellowship" has helped it "gain entree into almost impossible places in the capital."

"The Fellowship's reach into governments around the world is almost impossible to overstate or even grasp," said David Kuo, a former special assistant in George W. Bush's Office of Faith-Based and Community Initiatives.

== Beliefs and theology ==
The Fellowship Foundation's 501(c)(3) mission statement is:

To develop and maintain an informal association of people banded together, to go out as "ambassadors of reconciliation," modeling the principles of Jesus, based on loving God and loving others. To work with the leaders of many nations, and as their hearts are touched, the poor, the oppressed, the widows, and the youth of their country will be impacted in a positive manner. Youth groups will be developed under the thoughts of Jesus, including loving others as you want to be loved.

Newsweek reported that the Fellowship has often been criticized by conservative and fundamentalist Christian groups for being too inclusive and not putting enough emphasis on doctrine or church attendance. NPR has reported that the evangelical group's views on religion and politics are so singular that some other Christian right organizations consider them heretical.

David Kuo, who has been affiliated with the Fellowship since college, said of it that:

For all the hysteria about Christian organizations, the irony that the Fellowship is being targeted as a bad egg is jaw-dropping. This is so not Focus on the Family, this is so not the Christian Coalition. There are other Christian groups that are truly insane. Who purport to follow Jesus Christ and who I would submit do not. The Fellowship is a loosely banded group of people who have an affinity for Jesus.

Current Fellowship prayer group member and former U.S. Representative Tony P. Hall (D-OH) said, "If people in this country knew how many Democrats and Republicans pray together and actually like each other behind closed doors, they would be amazed." The Fellowship is simply "men and women who are trying to get right with God. Trying to follow God, learn how to love him, and learn how to love each other." When he lost his teenage son to leukemia, Hall says, "This family helped me. This family was there for me. That's what they do."

Hillary Clinton described meeting the leader of the Fellowship in 1993: "Doug Coe, the longtime National Prayer Breakfast organizer, is a unique presence in Washington: a genuinely loving spiritual mentor and guide to anyone, regardless of party or faith, who wants to deepen his or her relationship to God."

Investigative reporter Jeff Sharlet wrote a book, The Family: The Secret Fundamentalism at the Heart of American Power, as well as an article in Harper's magazine, describing his experience while serving as an intern in the Fellowship. Sharlet did intensive research in the Fellowship's archives before they were closed to the public. He also spent a month in 2002 living in a Fellowship house near Washington, and wrote a magazine article describing his experiences. According to his 2008 book, their theology is an "elite fundamentalism" that fetishizes political power and wealth, consistently opposes labor movements in the US and abroad, and teaches that laissez-faire economic policy is "God's will." He opines that their theological teaching of instant forgiveness has been useful to powerful men, providing them a convenient excuse for misdeeds or crimes and allowing them to avoid accepting responsibility or accountability for their actions.

== Leadership model ==
Jeff Sharlet stated in an NBC Nightly News report that when he was an intern with the Fellowship "we were being taught the leadership lessons of Hitler, Lenin and Mao" and that Hitler's genocide "wasn't really an issue for them, it was the strength that he emulated." He opined that the Fellowship fetishizes power by comparing Jesus to "Lenin, Ho Chi Minh, Bin Laden" as examples of leaders who change the world through the strength of the covenants they had forged with their 'brothers'".

In one videotaped lecture series in 1989, Coe said,

Hitler, Goebbels and Himmler were three men. Think of the immense power these three men had... But they bound themselves together in an agreement... Jesus said, 'You have to put me before other people. And you have to put me before yourself.' Hitler, that was the demand to be in the Nazi party. You have to put the Nazi party and its objectives ahead of your own life and ahead of other people.

In the same series, Coe also compared Jesus's teachings to the Red Guard during the Chinese Cultural Revolution:

I've seen pictures of young men in the Red Guard of China... They would bring in this young man's mother and father, lay her on the table with a basket on the end, he would take an axe and cut her head off... They have to put the purposes of the Red Guard ahead of the mother-father-brother-sister — their own life! That was a covenant. A pledge. That was what Jesus said.

David Kuo said that Coe is using Hitler as a metaphor for commitment. The NBC report said "a close friend of Coe told NBC News that he invokes Hitler to show the power of small groups—for good and bad. And, the friend said, most of the time he talks about Jesus."

== Secrecy ==
In a report on the Fellowship, the Los Angeles Times found:

[Fellowship members] share a vow of silence about Fellowship activities. Oddly, it is categorized under US law as a church rather than a political lobbying organization, so financial sources and budget expenditures remain unknown. Coe and others cite biblical admonitions against public displays of good works, insisting they would not be able to tackle their diplomatically sensitive missions if they drew public attention. Members, including congressmen, invoke this secrecy rule when refusing to discuss just about every aspect of the Fellowship and their involvement in it.

The Fellowship has long been a secretive organization. Rob Schenck wrote that "all ministries in Washington need to protect the confidence of those we minister to, and I'm sure that's a primary motive for C Street's low profile." But he added, "I think The Fellowship has been just a tad bit too clandestine."

Prominent political figures have insisted that confidentiality and privacy are essential to the Fellowship's operation. In 1985, President Ronald Reagan said about the Fellowship, "I wish I could say more about it, but it's working precisely because it is private." At the 1990 National Prayer Breakfast, President George H. W. Bush praised Douglas Coe for what he described as "quiet diplomacy, I wouldn't say secret diplomacy." In 2009, Chris Halverson, son of Fellowship co-founder Richard C. Halverson, said that a culture of pastoral confidentiality is essential to the ministry: "If you talked about it, you would destroy that fellowship."

In the 1960s, the Fellowship began distributing to involved members of Congress notes that stated that "the group, as such, never takes any formal action, but individuals who participate in the group through their initiative have made possible the activities mentioned."

In 1974, after several Watergate conspirators had joined the Fellowship, a Los Angeles Times columnist discouraged further inquiries into Washington's "underground prayer movement", i.e. the Fellowship: "They genuinely avoid publicity... they shun it."

In 1975, a member of the Fellowship's inner circle wrote to the group's chief South African operative, that their political initiatives

... have always been misunderstood by 'outsiders.' As a result of very bitter experiences, therefore, we have learned never to commit to paper any discussions or negotiations that are taking place. There is no such thing as a 'confidential' memorandum, and leakage always seems to occur. Thus, I would urge you not to put on paper anything relating to any of the work that you are doing... [unless] you know the recipient well enough to put at the top of the page 'PLEASE DESTROY AFTER READING.'

In 2002, Coe denied that the Fellowship Foundation owns the National Prayer Breakfast. Jennifer Thornett, a Fellowship employee, said that "there is no such thing as the Fellowship".

Former Republican senator William Armstrong said the group has "made a fetish of being invisible".

On January 5, 2010, Fellowship member Bob Hunter gave an interview on national television in which he stated:

But I do agree with you, that The Fellowship is too secret. We don't have a Web site. We don't have – we have a lot of good ministers, 200 ministers doing good works that nobody knows about. I think that's wrong, and there's a debate going on among a lot of people about whether and how we should change that.

== Activities ==
=== National Prayer Breakfast ===
Fellowship Foundation is best known for the National Prayer Breakfast, held each year on the first Thursday of February in Washington, D.C. First held in 1953, the event is now attended by over 3,400 guests including dignitaries from many nations. The President of the United States typically makes an address at the breakfast, following the main speaker's keynote address. The event is hosted by a 24-member committee of members of Congress. Democrats and Republicans serve on the organizing committee, and chairmanship alternates each year between the House and Senate.

At the National Prayer Breakfast, the president usually arrives an hour early and meets with eight to ten heads of state, usually of small nations, and guests chosen by the Fellowship.

G. Philip Hughes, the executive secretary for the National Security Council in the George H.W. Bush administration, said, "Doug Coe or someone who worked with him would call and say, 'So and so would like to have a word with the president. Do you think you could arrange something?'" However, Coe said that the Fellowship does not help foreign dignitaries gain access to U.S. officials. "We never make any commitment, ever, to arrange special meetings with the president, vice president or secretary of State," Coe said. "We would never do it."

At the 2001 Senate Foreign Relations Committee confirmation hearings for State Department officials, Sen. Bill Nelson, whose wife was on the board of the Fellowship, lamented that the State Department had blocked then-President Bush from meeting with four foreign heads of state (Rwanda, Macedonia, Congo and Slovakia) at the NPB that year. Senator Paul Sarbanes said of Nelson's complaint: "I'm not sure a head of state ought to be able to wander over here for the prayer breakfast and, in effect, compel the president of the United States to meet with him as a consequence... Getting these meetings with the president is a process that's usually very carefully vetted and worked up. Now sort of this back door has sort of evolved."

"It [the NPB] totally circumvents the State Department and the usual vetting within the administration that such a meeting would require," an anonymous government informant told sociologist D. Michael Lindsay. "If Doug Coe can get you some face time with the President of the United States, then you will take his call and seek his friendship. That's power."

In 2023, The International Foundation held a separate event from the National Prayer Breakfast called "The Gathering" at the same time. Attendees of this new event still watched President Joe Biden's remarks from the National Prayer Breakfast through a livestream according to A. Larry Ross who is a media representative for The International Foundation.

=== Prayer Breakfast movement ===
A primary activity of the Fellowship is to develop small support groups for politicians, including senators and members of Congress, Executive Branch officials, military officers, foreign leaders and dignitaries, businesspersons, and other influential individuals. Prayer groups have met in the White House, Pentagon, and at the Department of Defense.

==== Russia ====
Doug Burleigh is a key figure in the organization and has spoken at the Russian prayer breakfast beside Alexander Torshin. Burleigh stated in 2017 that "a breakthrough in relations between Russia and the US is about to occur". Maria Butina, who has admitted to working as an undeclared Kremlin agent, helped arrange for five Russians chosen by a top official to attend the 2017 National Prayer Breakfast which she also attended before she was indicted and imprisoned. Butina's main contact in Russia was Torshin. Over 50 Russians attended the 2018 National Prayer Breakfast, including leading members of Putin's government. Doug Burleigh was interviewed by the FBI because of his relationship with Maria Butina.

=== Role in international conflicts ===
The Fellowship was a behind-the-scenes player at the Camp David Accords in 1978, working with President Jimmy Carter to issue a worldwide call to prayer with Israeli prime minister Menachem Begin and Egyptian president Anwar Sadat.

Sharlet has criticized the fellowship's influence on US foreign policy. He argues that Coe and the "networking" (or formation of prayer cells) between foreign dictators and US politicians, defense contractors, and industry leaders facilitated military aid for repressive foreign regimes. Regarding his relationships with foreign dictators, Coe said in 2007, "I never invite them. They come to me. And I do what Jesus did: I don't turn my back to any one. You know, the Bible is full of mass murderers."

=== Private diplomacy ===
The Los Angeles Times examined the Fellowship Foundation's ministry records and archives (before they were sealed), as well as documents obtained from several presidential libraries and found that the Fellowship Foundation had extraordinary access and significant influence over U.S. foreign affairs for the last 75 years.

The Fellowship has funded the travel expenses of members of Congress to various hot spots throughout the globe, an example being Robert Aderholt to Darfur. In 2002, Frank Wolf, Tony P. Hall and Joe Pitts traveled to Afghanistan and Pakistan on a fact-finding congressional trip, meeting with the leaders of both Muslim countries. According to Pitts, "The first thing we did when we met with [Afghan] President Karzai and [then Pakistan] President Musharraf was to say, 'We're here officially representing the Congress; we'll report back to the speaker, our leaders, our committees, our government. But we're here also because we're best friends... We're members of the same prayer group'".

Coe was dispatched to foreign governments with the blessing of Congressional representatives and helped arrange meetings overseas for U.S. officials and members of Congress. In 1979, for instance, he messaged the Saudi Arabian Minister of Commerce and asked him to meet with a Defense Department official who was visiting Riyadh, the capital.

The Fellowship has brought controversial international figures to Washington to meet with U.S. officials. Among them are former Salvadoran Gen. Carlos Eugenio Vides Casanova, who in 2002 was found liable by a civil jury in Florida for the torture of thousands of civilians in the 1980s. He was invited to the 1984 prayer breakfast, along with Gen. Gustavo Alvarez Martinez, then head of the Honduran armed forces who was linked to a death squad and the Central Intelligence Agency.

Coe was quoted in a rare interview regarding the Fellowship's associations with despots as explaining, "The people that are involved in this association of people around the world are the worst and the best, some are total despots. Some are totally religious. You can find what you want to find."

Coe also claimed that the Fellowship does not help foreign dignitaries gain access to U.S. officials. "We never make any commitment, ever, to arrange special meetings with the president, vice president or secretary of State", Coe said. "We would never do it". The LA Times found that "the archives tell another story".

The Fellowship has promoted reconciliation between the warring leaders of the Democratic Republic of the Congo, Burundi, and Rwanda. In 2001, the Fellowship helped arrange a secret meeting at The Cedars between Democratic Republic of Congo President Joseph Kabila and Rwandan President Paul Kagame – one of the first discreet meetings between the two African leaders that led to a peace accord in July 2002.

In 1994 at the National Prayer Breakfast, the Fellowship helped to persuade South African Zulu chief Mangosuthu Buthelezi not to engage in a civil war with Nelson Mandela.

According to Jeff Sharlet, Senator Sam Brownback is a Fellowship member who leads a secret "cell" of leading U.S. Senators and representatives to influence U.S. foreign policy. Sharlet reports that the group has stamped much of U.S. foreign policy through a group of senators and affiliated religious organizations forming the "Values Action Team" or "VAT". One victory for the group was Brownback's North Korea Human Rights Act, which establishes a confrontational stance toward North Korea and shifts funds for humanitarian aid from the UN to Christian organizations.

The Fellowship is behind an international project called Youth Corps, a network of Christian youth groups that Sharlet alleged attract teenagers, and only later steer them to Jesus.

Fellowship funds have gone to an orphanage in India, a program in Uganda that provides schooling, and a development group in Peru.

==== The Fellowship and Uganda ====
In a November 2009 NPR interview, Sharlet alleged that Ugandan Fellowship associates David Bahati and Nsaba Buturo were behind the recent proposed bill in Uganda that called for the death penalty for gays.

Sharlet claimed that Bahati reportedly first floated the idea of executing gays during The Family's Uganda National Prayer Breakfast in 2008. Sharlet described Bahati as a "rising star" in the Fellowship who has attended the National Prayer Breakfast in the United States and, until the news over the gay execution law broke, was scheduled to attend the 2010 U.S. National Prayer Breakfast.

Fellowship member Bob Hunter gave an interview to NPR in December 2009 in which he acknowledged Bahati's connection but argued that no American associates support the bill. President Barack Obama, in his address to the Fellowship at their National Prayer Breakfast in early 2010, directly criticized the Uganda legislation targeting gay people for execution.

In 2023, Fellowship paid for Tim Walberg's keynote at the Ugandan National Prayer Breakfast, attended by president Yoweri Museveni. Walberg urged the country's leadership to "stand firm" on the Anti-Homosexuality Act, 2023, and resist opposition from the United States, United Nations, or other international entities.

== Relationships with other organizations ==
The Fellowship Foundation is linked to numerous other organizations:

- Wilberforce Foundation
- Traditional Values Coalition
- International Center for Religion & Diplomacy
- Young Life International
- World Vision

== Handling of politicians' extramarital affairs ==
In 2009, the Fellowship received media attention in connection with three Republican politicians who reportedly engaged in extra-marital affairs. Two of them, Senator John Ensign, chairman of the Republican Policy Committee in the Senate and the fourth-ranking member in his party's Senate leadership, and South Carolina governor Mark Sanford, immediate past chair of the Republican Governors Association and U.S. representative from 1995 to 2001, were considering running for president in 2012. The affairs of Ensign and then-Congressman Chip Pickering, R-Miss., took place while they were living at the C Street Center.

=== Ensign affair ===
Ensign, a Fellowship member and longtime resident of the C Street Center, admitted in June 2009 to an extra-marital affair with Cindy Hampton. Hampton was Ensign's campaign treasurer and the wife of his co-chief of staff, longtime friend and fellow worshipper Doug Hampton.

The Washington Post reported that the C Street House "pulsed with backstage intrigue, in the days and months before the Sanford and Ensign scandals" and that residents tried to talk each politician into ending his philandering. An emotional meeting was reportedly held to discuss "forgiveness" between Hampton, the husband of Ensign's mistress, and Senator Tom Coburn. Coburn, with Timothy and David Coe, leaders of the Fellowship, attempted to intervene to end Ensign's affair in February 2008.

Doug Hampton said he was not directly advised by the Fellowship to cover up Ensign's affair with his wife, but instead to "be cool". After losing his job with Ensign and losing a subsequent lobbying job, Hampton has said that he was in financial distress and reached out to Coburn—a C Street resident—in an effort to reach an agreement with Ensign. Coburn has denied negotiating a deal, but has stated that he "had worked to 'bring two families to a closure of a very painful episode'". Hampton has expressed the belief that his friends at C Street abandoned him by choosing to close ranks around Ensign, and that for them, the episode was "[more] about preserving John [Ensign], preserving the Republican party...preserving C Street" than about doing the right thing.

Ensign's efforts to cover up his affair were investigated by the Senate Ethics Committee and the Department of Justice.

=== Role in affair of Mark Sanford ===
South Carolina Governor Mark Sanford, who served as a congressman from 1995 to 2001, admitted in June 2009 to having an extramarital affair and said he had sought counseling at the C Street Center during the months before the news broke. Sanford "was a frequent visitor to the home for prayer meetings and meals during his time in Congress".

=== Pickering case ===
Chip Pickering was a U.S. Representative from Mississippi from 1997 to 2008. In 2009, his wife filed suit against Elizabeth Creekmore Byrd, his former college sweetheart and alleged mistress. Mrs. Pickering alleged that her husband restarted his relationship with Byrd while he was "a United States congressman prior to and while living in the well-known C Street Complex in Washington, D.C."

== C Street Center ==
The Fellowship runs a three-story brick mansion in Washington D.C. known as "C Street" (133 C St SE). It is the former convent for nearby St. Peter's Church. It is located a short distance from the United States Capitol. The structure has 12 bedrooms, nine bathrooms, five living rooms, four dining rooms, three offices, a kitchen, and a small "chapel".

The facility houses mostly Republican members of Congress. The house is also the locale for:

- An annual Ambassador Luncheon
- Receptions for foreign dignitaries, including the prime minister of Australia Kevin Rudd

C Street has been the subject of controversy over its claimed tax status as a church, the ownership of the property and its connection to the Fellowship, and the reportedly subsidized benefits the facility provides to members of Congress.

== Property holdings ==
=== Arlington ===
Fellowship Foundation purchased a large old house in 1978 in the Woodmont neighborhood of Arlington Virginia called The Doubleday Mansion (located at 2145 24th St N). Now called The Cedars, the 7-acre property, located less than 3 miles from the White House and which also has quarters for volunteers, a detached two-story garage and a gardener's cottage, is zoned as a worship and teaching center. This property currently (and has for many years) serves as the headquarters for the organization. The home is also used as a center for Bible studies, counseling, hymn sings, life mentoring, prayer groups, prayer breakfasts, luncheons, dinners, and hospitality receptions for international reconciliation and conflict resolution initiatives. The home was once surrounded by cedar trees and so was renamed The Cedars (or simply Cedars). It is a historic landmark house.

Coe has described Cedars as a place "committed to the care of the underprivileged, even though it looks very wealthy." He noted that people might say, "Why don't you sell a chandelier and help poor people?" Answering his own question, Coe said, "The people who come here have tremendous influence over kids." Private documents indicate that Cedars was purchased so that "people throughout the world who carry heavy responsibilities could meet in Washington to think together, plan together and pray together about personal and public problems and opportunities." Cedars hosts prayer breakfasts, luncheons and dinners for ambassadors, congressional representatives, foreign religious leaders and many others.

=== Other Fellowship properties ===
- "19th Street House," a two-story, brick apartment building located in Washington DC at 859 19th Street NE, used for afterschool activities.

== Finances ==
In 2007, The Fellowship Foundation received nearly $16.8 million to support 400 ministries.

== See also ==
- Ralph Drollinger
- Oxford Group

== Bibliography ==
- Sharlet, Jeffry 'Jeff' (2008), The Family: The Secret Fundamentalism at the Heart of American Power, HarperCollins, ISBN 978-0-06-055979-3.
