= Jeff Sharlet (writer) =

American journalist

- Born: 1972 (age 53–54)
- Education: Hampshire College (BA)
- Occupation: Author
- Employer: Dartmouth College

Jeff Sharlet (born 1971) is an American academic, journalist, and author. He is the Frederick Sessions Beebe '35 Professor in the Art of Writing at Dartmouth College. Throughout his career, Sharlet's work has focused on religion.

== Career ==
He is a contributing editor for Harper's, Virginia Quarterly Review, and Rolling Stone. His work has also appeared in Vanity Fair, The New York Times Magazine, GQ, Esquire, Lapham's Quarterly, Oxford American, Bookforum, The Washington Post, Mother Jones, New York, Advocate, Guernica, The Chronicle of Higher Education, Columbia Journalism Review, New Statesman, The Nation, The New Republic, Forward, and The Baffler. He has taught at New York University and is the Frederick Sessions Beebe '35 Professor in the Art of Writing at Dartmouth College. He is the recipient of the National Magazine Award for Reporting, the MOLLY National Journalism Prize, the International Gay and Lesbian Human Rights Commission's Outspoken Award, and the Military Religious Freedom Foundation's Thomas Jefferson Award.

Sharlet is the co-creator of two online journals: Killing the Buddha, a literary magazine about religion, co-founded with Peter Manseau and The Revealer, a review of religion and media published by the New York University Center for Religion and Media.

He is the former editor-in-chief of Pakn Treger, a journal published by the National Yiddish Book Center.

Sharlet's interest in religion developed during childhood. Sharlet's mother was from a Pentecostal Christian background. His father is of secular Jewish background. Raised in an eclectic religious environment, attending various people's churches and temples, he has said that he gravitates to stories about people's beliefs as the most natural way to engage the world.

Sharlet was an executive producer of the five-part Netflix series The Family (2019), based on his books The Family: The Secret Fundamentalism at the Heart of American Power and C Street: The Fundamentalist Threat to American Democracy. The Fellowship Foundation, aka The Family, hosts the annual National Prayer Breakfast in DC. Sharlet appears in interview segments throughout the series.

== Published books ==
- In 2023 W.W. Norton published: The Undertow: Scenes from a Slow Civil War
- In 2020 W.W. Norton published This Brilliant Darkness: A Book of Strangers.
- In 2014 Yale University Press published Radiant Truths: Essential Dispatches, Reports, Confessions, and Other Essays on American Belief, edited by Jeff Sharlet.
- In 2011 W.W. Norton published Sweet Heaven When I Die: Faith, Faithlessness, and the Country In Between. The book investigates the margins of personal belief in America.
- In 2010, Little Brown published C Street: The Fundamentalist Threat to American Democracy.
- In 2009 Beacon Press published Believer, Beware: First-Person Dispatches from the Margins of Faith, co-edited by Sharlet and Peter Manseau.
- In 2008 HarperCollins published The Family: The Secret Fundamentalism at the Heart of American Power. The book investigates the political power of The Family, a secretive association of Christian evangelicals.
- In 2004 Free Press published Killing the Buddha: A Heretic's Bible, coauthored by Sharlet and Peter Manseau.
