= James W. Downing =

United States Navy officer

- Born: August 22, 1913; Oak Grove, Jackson County, Missouri, United States
- Died: February 13, 2018 (aged 104); Colorado Springs, Colorado, United States
- Spouse: Morena Holmes (m. 1941; died 2010)
- Children: 7
- Military career
- Allegiance: United States
- Branch: United States Navy
- Service years: 1932–1956
- Rank: Lieutenant
- Nickname: Jim
- Commands: USS Patapsco (AOG-1)
- Conflicts: World War II (Pearl Harbor); Korean War
- Other work: Deputy president; Author
- Website: www.navigators.org/jim-downing-a-life-well-lived

James Willis Downing (August 22, 1913 – February 13, 2018) was a lieutenant in the United States Navy. He retired in 1956 after 24 years of service, which included being commanding officer of the USS Patapsco. At the time of his death, he was the second-oldest living survivor of the attack on Pearl Harbor, about which he authored a book.

== Background ==
Downing was born in Oak Grove, Missouri. At the time of his high school graduation, America was in the Great Depression. Jobs were scarce, so Downing enlisted in the Navy in September 1932. He began serving at Long Beach Naval Shipyard, California, the port for most of the Pacific naval fleet. He became a gunner's mate and postmaster aboard the USS West Virginia.

== Pearl Harbor ==
On the morning of December 7, 1941, Downing and his new wife Morena were staying with his shipmates in Honolulu. The radio announced an attack on the Naval Station Pearl Harbor, and the sailors rushed to the port.

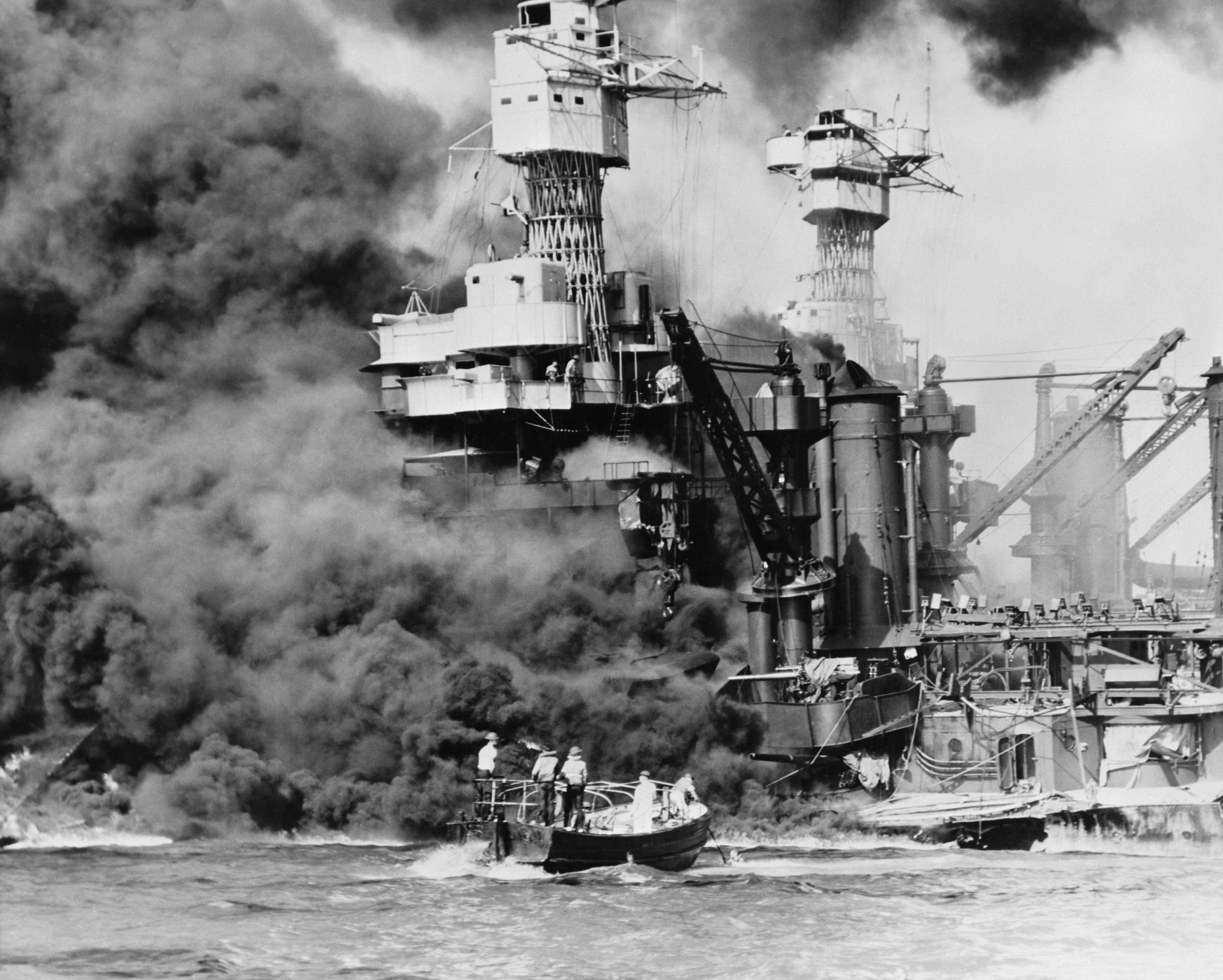
West Virginia partially sunk and burning during the attack on Pearl Harbor

By the time Downing arrived at the West Virginia, Japanese bombers had targeted her with nine torpedoes. Moored at a shallow water depth of only 40 feet (12 m), the ship had not completely sunk, and her deck was on fire. Downing assisted the injured crew and used a water hose from the USS Tennessee to keep the ammunition onboard from exploding.

Downing tried to commit to memory the names on the dog tags of those killed, and later visited the wounded at the naval hospital. He recorded the names of the wounded and fatally injured in a notebook, along with messages they wished to convey. As the postmaster, Downing had access to the home addresses of these men, and he later wrote notes to each family, explaining what had happened to their relatives and their current condition.

== Later naval career ==
Downing went on to be an adviser to the Brazilian fleet in Rio de Janeiro, serving aboard the USS Nespelen, and was an assistant professor of Naval Science at Kings Point.

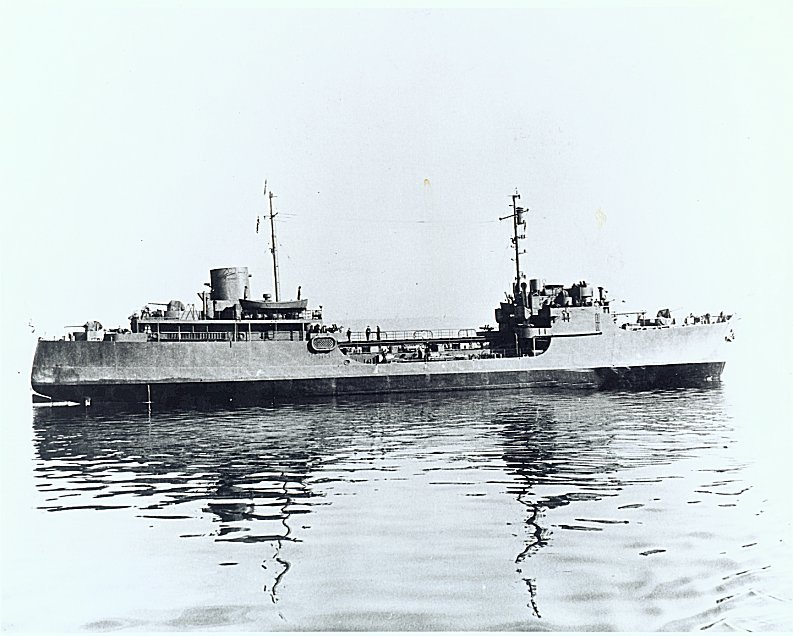
The tanker USS Patapsco, Downing's command during the mid-1950s

He also was made commanding officer of the USS Patapsco, which served as a supply ship during the Korean War. Downing additionally assumed the role of ship chaplain. In 1954, he and his crew were exposed to very high levels of radiation from Castle Bravo, part of the series of nuclear testing at Bikini Atoll. He retired from the Navy in 1956.

== After the Navy ==
Prior to Pearl Harbor, Downing befriended Dawson Trotman, a Christian minister who eventually founded The Navigators, an interdenominational ministry. Trotman died the same year that Downing retired from the Navy, and the Downings moved to Colorado Springs, Colorado, taking over Glen Eyrie, home of the branch there. Downing served as deputy president, chairman of the board of directors and director of the ministries in Europe, the Middle East, and Africa. He retired as a full-time minister in 1983.

== Personal life ==
While serving together, Dawson Trotman encouraged Downing to court Morena Mae Holmes, an Arkansas native who had just graduated from Biola University in Los Angeles. They were married in July 1941 in Honolulu. On Christmas Day 1941, Morena returned to the mainland and would not see her husband again until they moved to Washington, D.C. in 1943. They each had responsibilities with The Navigators and remained in Colorado Springs after his retirement. They had seven children. Morena died on February 9, 2010, at age 93. Downing died on February 13, 2018, at age 104.

== Book ==
In 2016, Downing wrote an autobiography, titled The Other Side of Infamy: My Journey through Pearl Harbor and the World of War. The book details his military career, Pearl Harbor, and how people of faith endure troubled times. Writing at age 102 years and 176 days when the final draft of his book was accepted for publication, Downing was honored by the Guinness World Records as the "oldest male author"; i.e., oldest male to author a book. With his death two years later at 104, his title transitioned to "oldest author ever". Despite the male qualification, Guinness themselves state the oldest female author to be Bertha Wood, aged 100, which means Downing is the oldest verified author of all time, according to Guinness. Somewhat contradictorily, however, Guinness has also stated thy Sarah Louise and Annie Elizabeth Delany were the oldest authors of all time, at 105 years and 103 years, respectively; however, this depends on whether the Delany sisters are to be given co-authorship credit for the book which they were the primary subject of.
