= Jeremy Hall =

Jeremy Hall may refer to:

- Jeremy Hall (footballer) (born 1988), Puerto Rican football player and manager
- Jeremy Hall (United States Army) (born 1985), United States Army specialist and atheist
- Jeremy Hall (businessman) (born 1965), British businessman and chairman of Who's Who Publications Plc
