= Jerry White (Navigators) =

United States Air Force general

Jerry E. White
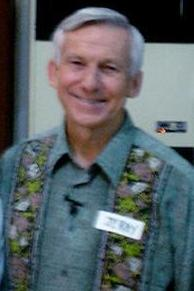
- White in retirement at an event in Manila, Philippines in 2005.
- Born: June 11, 1937; Garden City, Iowa
- Military career
- Allegiance: United States of America
- Branch: United States Air Force
- Service years: 1959–1992; 1993–1997
- Rank: Major General
- Awards: Defense Superior Service Medal; Legion of Merit; Meritorious Service Medal; Air Force Commendation Medal

Jerry E. White (born June 11, 1937) is a retired United States Air Force major general, author and former leader of the Christian parachurch organization, the Navigators.

== Military career ==
White entered the Air Force in 1959 as a graduate of the University of Washington Reserve Officer Training Corps program. From 1959 to 1964 he was moved between several air force bases while studying, including a stint in the Directorate of range operations, Air Force Missile Test Center, Patrick Air Force Base. In 1964 he was then appointed as an instructor, in the Astronautics Department, of the Air Force Academy at Colorado Springs. After study at Purdue University, White became an associate professor of astronautics, at the U.S. Air Force Academy in 1968, and was part of the scientific staff until the end of his active duty in 1973. The same year he enlisted in the Air Force Reserve, was mobilised and served in various capacities from then until his retirement at the rank of Major-General in 1997. Notably he was part of the electronic security command at Cheyenne Mountain Military Complex from 1980 to 1987.

== Leadership of the Navigators ==
White was formerly the International President of The Navigators, a worldwide Christian parachurch organization whose main purpose is the discipling (training) of Christians, with a particular emphasis on personal evangelism. White took over leadership of the Navigator organization from Lorne Sanny in 1986. Sanny had served as president of The Navigators since the death of the ministry's founder, Dawson Trotman, in 1956. On January 1, 2005, White was succeeded by Michael W. Treneer. Lauren Libby, vice-president of the Navigators, commented to the Christian Examiner that:

“Jerry White’s contributions to the worldwide ministry of The Navigators are deeply significant,” Libby said. “When I consider the global changes that have occurred over the past 18 years, we are blessed to have Jerry’s prayerful and thoughtful leadership. We are adapting to an ever-changing world without compromising our values or our beliefs. Jerry’s integrity and commitment to God—and his commitment to the vision of The Navigators—certainly propelled this.”

== Author ==
White has been a prolific author, co-authoring a textbook on astrodynamics as well as several Christian books about discipleship, self-help, and masculinity.

== Personal life ==
White was born in Iowa, but grew up in Spokane, Washington. He studied electrical engineering at the University of Washington and graduated with a Bachelor of Science degree in 1959, then completed a Master of Science in astronautics at the Air Force Institute of Technology in 1964. He is married to Mary Ann and had 4 children and 11 grandchildren.

In April 1990 the Whites' son, Stephen, was murdered. In an interview prior to the release of his 2002 book Making Peace with Reality: Ordering Your Life In A Chaotic World, White reflected on his son's death:

It caused us to re-examine everything. We, personally, had significant depth in the Word, having done Bible study for many years. But especially in the areas of God’s sovereignty and God’s love, we had to re-examine and “come to peace with the reality” that God is sovereign and that good will come out of this. It was quite difficult, but it was a true testament of our beliefs. I’m so grateful that both Mary and I had deep spiritual roots. Those roots deepened much through this time. I now had to live in a new reality.

== Books ==
- Fundamentals of Astrodynamics with Roger R. Bate and Donald D. Mueller (Dover Publications, 1971)
- Honesty, Morality, and Conscience (NavPress, 1979)
- The Church and the parachurch: an uneasy marriage (Multnomah, 1983)
- The Power of Commitment (NavPress, 1987)
- Dangers Men Face (NavPress, 1997)
- Making Peace with Reality: Ordering Your Life in a Chaotic World (NavPress, 2001)
- The Joseph Road: Choices That Determine Your Destiny (NavPress, 2010)
- Unfinished: How to Approach Life's Detours, Do-Overs, and Disappointments (NavPress, 2012)
- Rules to Live By: 52 principles for a better life (NavPress, 2014)
