= Queen's Canyon =

Queen′s Canyon is a moderate hiking trail which crosses Glen Eyrie private property on the west side of Colorado Springs, near the North entrance to Garden of the Gods park. The trail is known for Dorothy Falls and five granite pools filled with mountain water, known collectively as the punch bowls. The first half of this trail is a wood-planked path that hugs walls of the gorge.

== Trail Closure ==
Due to damage from the Waldo Canyon fire, Queen′s Canyon was closed in 2012 due to increased flash flood danger. The earliest the trail might open is in 2029.
