= With God on Our Side =

With God on our side may also refer to:

- With God On Our Side (film) (2010), a documentary about Christian Zionism
- "God on Our Side", title of Episode 25 of Revelations – The Initial Journey (2002)
- "With God on Our Side" (song), a song by Bob Dylan on his 1964 album The Times They Are A-Changin'
- With God on Our Side: One Man's War Against an Evangelical Coup in America's Military, a 2006 book by Michael Weinstein

== See also ==
- Gott mit uns, the German phrase.
- In God We Trust
