= Chris Rodda =

American author and blogger

Chris Rodda is an American author and blogger, who has commented extensively on religious and historical matters. She is the Senior Research Director for the Military Religious Freedom Foundation (MRFF).

== Activities ==
Rodda is the author of Liars For Jesus: The Religious Right's Alternate Version of American History ISBN 1419644386 (BookSurge Publishing, 2006) and wrote blog "This Week in Christian Nationalism," which was part of the blog group Freethought Blogs. Liars For Jesus: The Religious Right's Alternate Version of American History (2006) "debunks many of the historical lies invented and used by the Christian nationalist history revisionists in their efforts to further their far right political agenda and destroy the wall of separation between church and state in America", and has been described as "a useful factual critique" of the views of David Barton.

She blogs at Talk2Action.org and the Huffington Post. She comments on Christian nationalist revisionism of American history and religious issues in the military.

In 2008 she opposed a Congressional resolution introduced by Randy Forbes to designate an "American Religious History Week." She has also campaigned on behalf of Native Americans in South Dakota.

By 30 April 2014, she gave up her writing presence on Freethoughtblogs, citing disagreements with some who use the website.

== Publications ==
- Liars For Jesus: The Religious Right's Alternate Version of American History
- Rodda, Chris (2010). "Against All Enemies, Foreign And Domestic". In Parc, James E.; Levy, David A. (eds.). Attitudes Aren't Free: Thinking Deeply About Diversity in the U.S. Armed Forces. Enso Books. pp. 69–98. ISBN 978-1-58566-204-3.
- James E. Parco; David A. Levy (2010). Attitudes Aren't Free: Thinking Deeply About Diversity in the U.S. Armed Forces. Enso Books. pp. 69–. ISBN 978-1-58566-204-3.
