= David Barton (author) =

American political activist and author (born 1954)

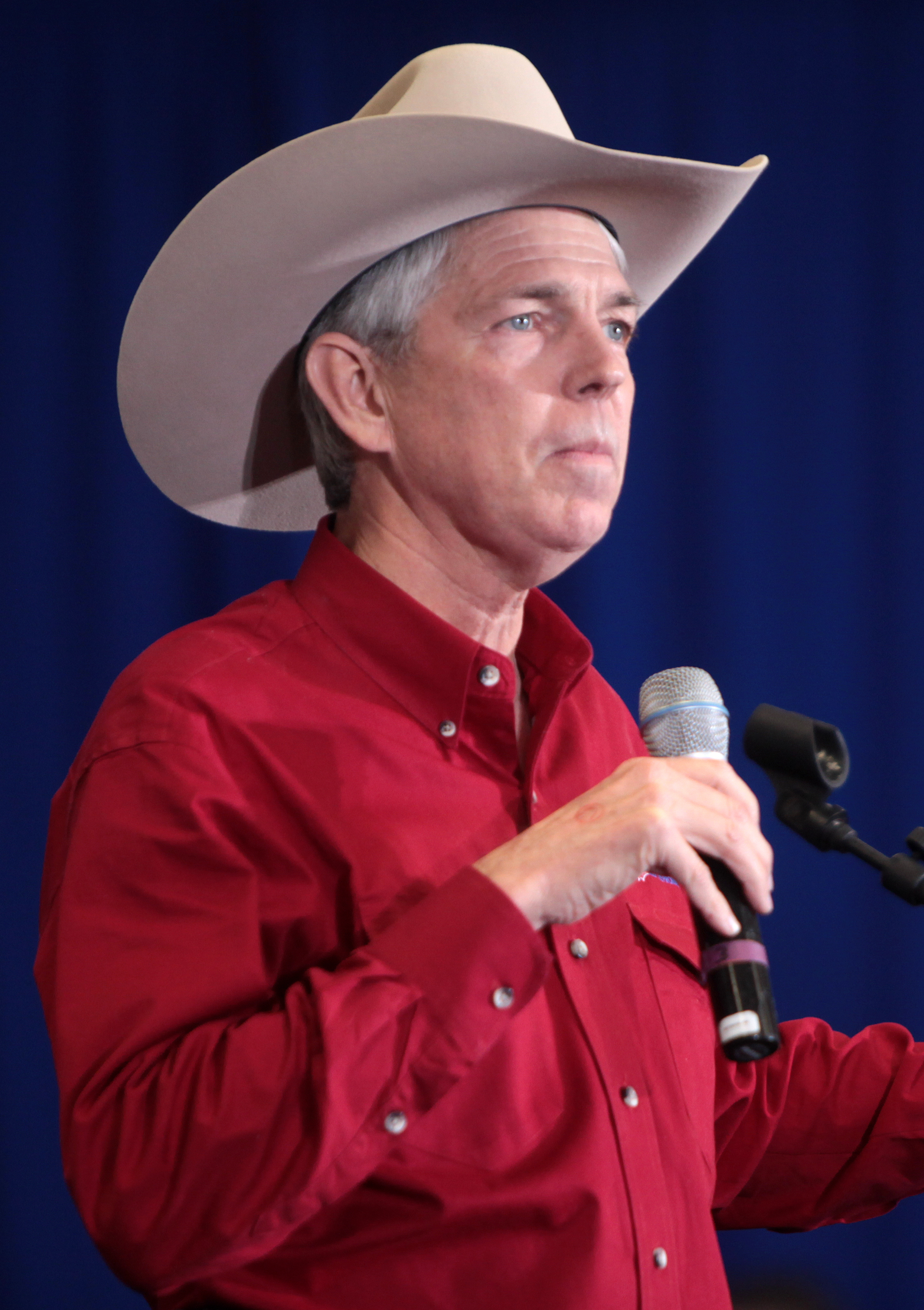
- Barton in 2016
- Born: Aledo, Texas, U.S.
- Education: Oral Roberts University (BA)
- Occupations: Author, political activist

David Barton is an evangelical Christian political activist and author. He is the founder of WallBuilders, LLC, a Texas-based organization that promotes his views about the religious basis of the United States.

Barton has been described as a Christian nationalist; his work is devoted to advancing the idea that the United States was founded as an explicitly Christian nation and rejecting the consensus view that the United States Constitution calls for separation of church and state. Historians have described his research as "flawed" and containing "outright falsehoods".

Barton is a former vice chair of the Republican Party of Texas and served as director of Keep the Promise PAC, a political action committee that supported the unsuccessful Ted Cruz 2016 presidential campaign.

== Early life, education, and family ==
Barton is a lifelong resident of Aledo, Texas, a suburb of the Dallas-Fort Worth Metroplex. He graduated from Aledo High School in 1972. He received a Bachelor of Arts degree in religious education from Oral Roberts University in 1976.

== Career ==
After graduating from college, Barton served as a youth pastor at churches in Tulsa, Oklahoma. He was employed as a teacher of math and science and eventually became principal at Aledo Christian School, a ministry of the charismatic church started by Barton's parents.

In 1987, Barton formed Specialty Research Associates, Inc., a company which said it focused on historical research "relating to America's constitutional, moral, and religious heritage". Specialty Research Associates submitted amicus curiae briefs in court cases. In 1988, the company became WallBuilders.

Barton is the founder and president of WallBuilders. WallBuilders publishes and sells most of Barton's books and videos, some of which present Barton's position that the modern view of separation of church and state is not consistent with the views of the Founding Fathers. Barton has argued that the religion clauses of the First Amendment were intended only for monotheistic religions, and perhaps solely Christianity. A 2005 Time magazine article entitled "The 25 Most Influential Evangelicals" called Barton "a major voice in the debate over church–state separation" who, despite the fact that "many historians dismiss his thinking ... [is] a hero to millions—including some powerful politicians". Barton has appeared on television and radio programs, including those of Republican presidential candidate Mike Huckabee and Glenn Beck. Beck has praised Barton as "the Library of Congress in shoes". In September 2013, he returned to the political arena and advised state legislators on how to fight the Common Core academic standards promoted by the Obama administration.

Barton was the vice chairman of the Texas Republican Party from 1997 to 2006 under state chairman Susan Weddington. He has also acted as a political consultant to the Republican National Committee on outreach to evangelicals. There was a Tea Party movement to get him to run against Senator John Cornyn in the 2014 Senate election from Texas. However, Barton announced on November 6, 2013, that he would not run for the seat. Barton headed the Keep the Promise PAC, a political action committee supporting Ted Cruz during his campaign for election as U.S. President in 2016. Cruz failed to receive the Republican nomination. Barton has also advised Newt Gingrich.

Barton's first non-self-published work was a 2003 article in the Notre Dame Journal of Law, Ethics & Public Policy, (Volume XVII Issue No. 2, 2003, p. 399), a survey of Thomas Jefferson's writings about the First Amendment.

Barton is the initial funder of Patriot Academy, a right-wing organization that says it gives participants "the physical training you need to be able to defend your family" and "intellectual ammunition to defend the Constitution".

== Affiliations ==
Barton has served on the board of advisors of the Providence Foundation. In an article discussing Barton, The Nation described the Providence Foundation as "a Christian Reconstructionist group that promotes the idea that biblical law should be instituted in America".

According to Skipp Porteous of the Massachusetts-based Institute for First Amendment Studies, Barton was listed in promotional literature as a "new and special speaker" at a 1991 summer retreat in Colorado sponsored by Scriptures for America, a far-right Christian Identity ministry headed by Pete Peters, which has been linked to neo-Nazi groups. Barton's assistant Kit Marshall said in 1993 that Barton was previously unaware of the anti-Semitic and racist views of these groups. In September 2011, Barton sued two former Texas State Board of Education candidates for posting a video on YouTube that stated that he was "known for speaking at white supremacist rallies".

Barton has been a guest on the television programs The 700 Club and The Daily Show. In 2013, Barton appeared on Kenneth Copeland's Believer's Voice of Victory program where he suggested that abortion caused climate change because God no longer protected the environment as punishment for legalized abortion.

He has been influential in the faith and intellectual life of Speaker of the House of Representatives Mike Johnson.

== Reception ==
Barton has been praised by American conservatives, including Mike Huckabee, Newt Gingrich, Michele Bachmann, Sam Brownback, and Trinity Broadcasting Network president Matt Crouch. By contrast, People for the American Way wrote, "This guy is David Barton, a Republican Party activist and a fast-talking, self-promoting, self-taught, self-proclaimed historian who is miseducating millions of Americans about U.S. history and the Constitution."

His work has been criticized by J. Brent Walker of the Baptist Joint Committee for Religious Liberty, Rob Boston of Americans United for Separation of Church and State, Gordon College history professor Stephen Phillips, Senator Arlen Specter, the Anti-Defamation League, Senior Research Director for the Military Religious Freedom Foundation Chris Rodda, Messiah College history professor John Fea, Baylor University historian Barry Hankins, and Grove City College professors Warren Throckmorton and Michael Coulter.

=== Accuracy ===
Barton's official biography describes him as "an expert in historical and constitutional issues". Barton holds no formal credentials in history or law, and scholars dispute the accuracy and integrity of his assertions about history, accusing him of practicing misleading historical revisionism, and spreading "outright falsehoods". According to the New York Times, "Many professional historians dismiss Mr. Barton, whose academic degree is in Christian Education from Oral Roberts University, as a biased amateur who cherry-picks quotes from history and the Bible."

Jay W. Richards, senior fellow at the Christian conservative Discovery Institute, said in 2012 that Barton's books and videos are full of "embarrassing factual errors, suspiciously selective quotes, and highly misleading claims". The Southern Poverty Law Center describes Barton's work as "anti-gay" "historical revisionism", noting that Barton has no formal training in history. A number of credentialed historians have called Barton's work "pseudohistory".

==== "Unconfirmed Quotations" ====
In 1995, in response to criticism by historian Robert Alley, Barton conceded, in an online article titled "Unconfirmed Quotations", that he had not located primary sources for 11 alleged quotes from James Madison, Thomas Jefferson, Benjamin Franklin, and U.S. Supreme Court decisions (hence, the title of the article), but maintained that the quotes were "completely consistent" with the views of the Founders. (By 2007, the article listed 14 unconfirmed quotations.) In 1996, Rob Boston of Americans United for Separation of Church and State accused Barton of "shoddy workmanship" and said that, despite these and other corrections, Barton's work "remains rife with distortions of history and court rulings". WallBuilders responded to its critics by saying that Barton followed "common practice in the academic community" in citing secondary sources, and that in publishing "Unconfirmed Quotations", Barton's intent was to raise the academic bar in historical debates pertinent to public policy.

In 2006, Barton told the Texas Monthly, with regard to Jefferson's letter to the Danbury Baptists, that he had never misquoted the letter in any of his publications. The magazine noted that this denial was contradicted by a 1990 version of Barton's video America's Godly Heritage, in which Barton said:

On January 1, 1802, Jefferson wrote to that group of Danbury Baptists, and in this letter, he assured them—he said the First Amendment has erected a wall of separation between church and state, he said, but that wall is a one-directional wall. It keeps the government from running the church, but it makes sure that Christian principles will always stay in government.

==== The Jefferson Lies ====
In 2012, Barton's New York Times bestseller The Jefferson Lies: Exposing the Myths You've Always Believed About Thomas Jefferson (published April 10, 2012) was voted "the least credible history book in print" by the users of the History News Network website. A group of ten conservative Christian professors reviewed the work and reported negatively on its claims, saying that Barton misstated facts about Jefferson.

In August 2012, Christian publisher Thomas Nelson withdrew the book from publication and stopped production, announcing that they had "lost confidence in the book's details" and "learned that there were some historical details included in the book that were not adequately supported". A senior executive said that Thomas Nelson could not stand by the book because "basic truths just were not there." Glenn Beck, who wrote the foreword, announced that his Mercury Ink imprint would issue a new edition of the book once the 17,000 remaining copies that Barton bought of the Thomas Nelson edition had been sold.

A revised edition of The Jefferson Lies was published by WND Books in January 2016.
