= James Downing =

James Downing may refer to:

- James W. Downing (1913–2018), American naval officer
- James R. Downing, American pathologist and executive at St. Jude Children's Research Hospital
- Jim Downing (born 1942), American racing driver, owner, and developer
- Jim Downing (Gaelic footballer) (1946–2012), Irish Gaelic footballer
