= Trijicon biblical verses controversy =

Stamping of Bible verses into optical sights for rifles

A Trijicon ACOG TA01-NSN referencing the Bible verses from John 8:12: "When Jesus spoke again to the people, He said, “I am the light of the world. Whoever follows me will never walk in darkness, but will have the light of life.”

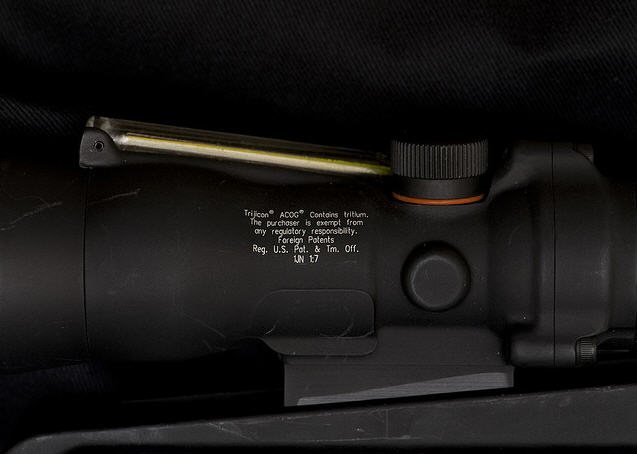
Another Trijicon scope marked with 1 John 1:7: "But if we walk in the light, as He is in the light, we have fellowship with one another, and the blood of Jesus, His Son, purifies us from all sin."

The Trijicon biblical verses controversy refers to the stamping of Bible verse references (e.g. "Rev 21:23") onto optical sights for rifles manufactured by Trijicon. Users and purchasers of the equipment—which included the United States Army, United States Marine Corps, and other military units around the world—were unaware of the inscriptions. Upon discovery of the practice in 2010, controversy erupted across religious and political spectra regarding inappropriate and sacrilegious aspects.

== ABC News report ==
On 18 January 2010, ABC News reported Trijicon was placing references to verses in the Bible in the serial numbers of sights sold to the United States Armed Forces. The "book chapter:verse" cites were appended to the model designation, and the majority of the cited verses are associated with light in darkness, referencing Trijicon's specialization in illuminated optics and night sights. The ABC News story was initiated by Michael L. Weinstein and the Military Religious Freedom Foundation, after being alerted to the practice by multiple sources including active duty military personnel.

Tom Munson, director of sales and marketing for Trijicon, said the practice of including the references was started in 1981 by Glyn Bindon, the company's founder and a devout Christian, who died in a 2003 plane crash.

== Responses ==
An interfaith organization spoke out against the practice.

A spokesman for United States Central Command, which manages military operations in Iraq and Afghanistan, opined the inscribed sights do not violate the military's self-imposed ban on proselytizing because there is no effort to distribute the equipment beyond the US troops who use them.

"This situation is not unlike the situation with U.S. currency", said the spokesman, Air Force Maj. John Redfield. "Are we going to stop using money because the bills have 'In God We Trust' on them? As long as the sights meet the combat needs of troops, they'll continue to be used.

On 20 January 2010, the BBC reported that the British Ministry of Defence, which had—when unaware of the issue—recently purchased 480 Trijicon sights for use in Afghanistan, appreciated that the markings could cause offense, and had taken the matter up with the company.

As news of the inscriptions surfaced, further armed forces became aware of the controversial practice. The New Zealand Special Air Service had purchased 260 of the scopes in 2004 and at the time was also unaware of the practice. The New Zealand SAS confirmed it would not stop using the sights as they are considered the best in the world. A New Zealand defence force spokesman was quoted as saying: "We deem them to be inappropriate". Prime Minister John Key said the government was not aware of the inscriptions when the equipment was purchased, adding: "We are in discussions with the company in the United States who will ensure the inscriptions are removed, and we wouldn't want them on future sights".

== End of practice for government contracts ==
On 22 January 2010, Trijicon announced it would stop the practice of engraving Biblical references on products sold to the US Army. It also offered to provide modification kits for the purpose of removing such engravings on sights already produced and sold to the military. In a statement, the company said it was both "prudent and appropriate" to remove the engravings. However, Trijicon's consumer products are still engraved with Biblical references in accordance with company tradition.

== Inscriptions ==
The Trijicon serial numbers in question were based on verses relating to illumination. The verse found on the RMRcc relates to its small size. The "book chapter:verse" references are found appended to the model designations.

Equipment	Inscription	Verse	Text	Reference
ACOG TA01	ACOG4X32JN8:12	John 8:12	When Jesus spoke again to the people, he said, "I am the light of the world. Whoever follows me will never walk in darkness, but will have the light of life".	
ACOG	1JN 1:7	1 John 1:7	But if we walk in the light, as He is in the light, we have fellowship with one another, and the blood of Jesus, His Son, purifies us from all sin."	
AccuPin	BW50G-BL PSA91:5	Psalms 91:5	Thou shalt not be afraid for the terror by night; nor for the arrow that flieth by day.	
Reflex II	REFLEX1X242COR4:6	2 Corinthians 4:6	For it is the God who said, 'Let your light shine out of darkness' who has shone in our hearts to give the light of the knowledge of the glory of God in Jesus Christ.	
RMR	RM01 2PE1:19	2 Peter 1:19	And so we have the prophetic word confirmed, which you do well to heed as a light that shines in a dark place, until the day dawns and the morning star rises in your hearts.	
RMRcc	CC06 MT13:32	Matthew 13:32	Though it is the smallest of all seeds, yet when it grows, it is the largest of garden plants and becomes a tree, so that the birds come and perch in its branches.	
Trijicon TA11	ACOG3.5X35MT5:16	Matthew 5:16	In the same way, let your light so shine before other, so that they may see your good works and give glory to your Father in heaven.	
AccuPoint	RXnn REV21:23	Revelation 21:23	And the city had no need of the sun, neither of the moon, to shine in it: for the glory of God did lighten it, and the Lamb is the light thereof.	
MCOG	MS07 1Th5:5	1 Thessalonians 5:5	You are all sons of the light and sons of the day. We do not belong to the night or to the darkness.	
RX30	TX42 IS60:1	Isaiah 60:1	Arise! Shine! For your light arrives! The splendor of the Lord shines on you!	
ACOG	ACOG6X 48PSA27:1	Psalms 27:1	The Lord is my light and my salvation/whom shall I fear?/The Lord is the stronghold of my life/of whom shall I be afraid?	
SRO	1COR4:5	1 Corinthians 4:5	Therefore judge nothing before the appointed time; wait until the Lord comes. He will bring to light what is hidden in darkness and will expose the motives of the heart. At that time each will receive their praise from God.	

== See also ==
- Religious symbolism in the United States military
