= With God on Our Side (book) =

2006 nonfiction book by Michael Weinstein

With God on Our Side: One Man's War Against an Evangelical Coup in America's Military
- Author: Michael L. Weinstein
- Language: English
- Subject: Military, Religion
- Publisher: Thomas Dunne Books
- Publication date: October 3, 2006
- Publication place: United States
- Media type: Print
- Pages: 272
- ISBN: 978-0-312-36143-3
- OCLC: 70775780
- Dewey Decimal: 358.40071/173 22
- LC Class: UG638.5.Q1 W45 2006

With God on Our Side: One Man's War Against an Evangelical Coup in America's Military is a 2006 book by Michael Weinstein, founder of the Military Religious Freedom Foundation, about what he sees as fundamentalist evangelical Christian influence in the United States Military and its institutions. A major contention of the book is undue privilege given to the organization Christian Embassy in access to military facilities and use of military personnel in its promotions.
