= USS Patapsco (AOG-1) =

1942 Patapsco-class gasoline tanker

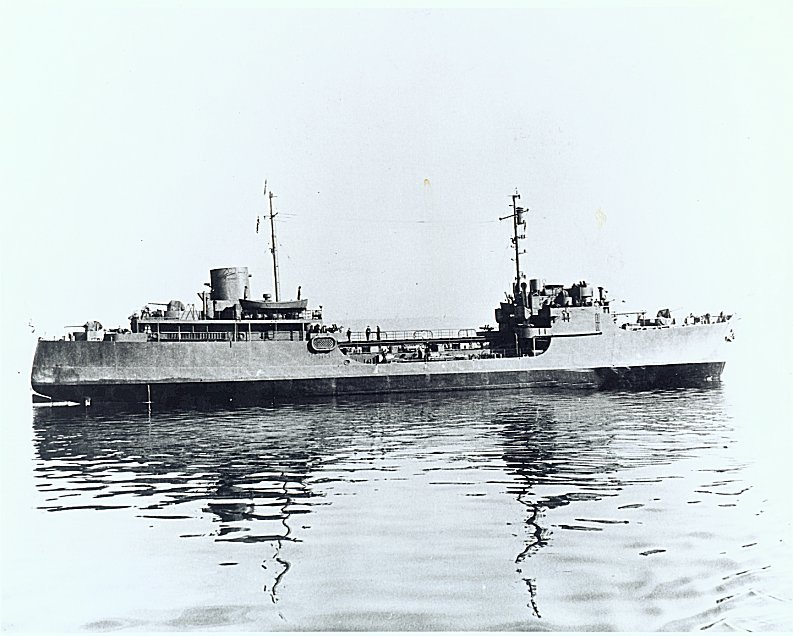

History

United States
- Name: USS Patapsco (1941–1974) Arctic Storm (1979–present)
- Namesake: Patapsco River in Maryland
- Builder: Seattle-Tacoma Shipbuilding Corporation
- Laid down: 25 May 1942
- Launched: 18 August 1942
- Sponsored by: Mrs. W.S. Zane
- Commissioned: 4 February 1943
- Decommissioned: 1 August 1974
- Out of service: Sold for commercial service, 1979
- Identification: IMO number: 8720113; MMSI number: 368555000; Callsign: WTQ5896
- Status: In commercial operation

General characteristics
- Displacement: 4,142 long tons (4,208 t)
- Length: 310 ft 9 in (94.72 m)
- Beam: 48 ft 6 in (14.78 m)
- Draft: 15 ft 4 in (4.67 m)
- Propulsion: Diesel Electric, twin screw
- Speed: 15.5 knots (17.8 mph; 28.7 km/h)
- Complement: 124
- Armament: 4 × 3"/50 caliber guns; 12 × 20 mm AA

Service record
- Operations: World War II, Korean War, Vietnam War
- Awards: 1 battle star (World War II); 1 battle star (Korea)

USS Patapsco (AOG–1) was a Patapsco-class gasoline tanker of the United States Navy, and the lead ship of her class. She saw service during World War II, the Korean War and the Vietnam War. Patapsco was the sixth ship of the US Navy to be named for the Patapsco River in Maryland. After decommissioning she was converted to a fishing vessel under the name Arctic Storm, and is currently in operation.

Patapsco was laid down 25 May 1942 by the Seattle-Tacoma Shipbuilding Corporation, Seattle; launched 18 August 1942; sponsored by Mrs. W. S. Zane; and commissioned 4 February 1943.

== Service history ==
=== World War II ===
Less than three weeks after commissioning, Patapsco departed San Francisco in convoy for Pearl Harbor. From there, on 27 March, she steamed southwest to New Caledonia, whence she transported gasoline and other petroleum products to ships and bases in the Solomons and New Hebrides until November 1944. In December, after availability at Auckland, New Zealand, she returned to the Solomons, remaining until 12 May 1945, when she departed Guadalcanal for the Western Carolines. Based on Ulithi from 19 May until the end of the war, she shuttled POL (Petroleum, Oil, Lubricants) products to the Palaus, and, once, to Saipan. After the war, she continued her Ulithi-Palau runs, then, in November, shifted her base to Guam whence she distributed fuel and light freight and carried passengers amongst the Marianas.

On 19 February 1946, she sailed east, and, after stopping at San Francisco, transited the Panama Canal and arrived at New Orleans for inactivation 3 May. Decommissioning 29 May 1946, she was later assigned to the Texas Group, Atlantic Reserve Fleet and berthed at Orange, Texas

=== Korean War ===
Following the outbreak of hostilities in Korea, Patapsco was reactivated. She recommissioned 19 October 1950 and, after overhaul at Norfolk, got underway for the Pacific 3 March 1951. Arriving at Pearl Harbor 9 April, she conducted fuel runs to Midway until 23 February 1952. Then, after a run to the Marshalls, the tanker sailed for Japan, arriving 25 April. Four days later she was under way to fuel vessels off the coast of the embattled Korean Peninsula and on her return took up station tanker duties at Sasebo. In late October, she shifted to Yokosuka, whence she sailed, 7 November, for Pearl Harbor.

With the new year, 1953, Patapsco resumed gasoline shuttle service to Midway and the Marshalls. On 6 August she sailed west again, this time to the Philippines, whence she carried aviation gasoline to Saigon, returning to Pearl Harbor 7 December. Until 1955, Patapsco served in Hawaiian waters with infrequent cruises to Midway, the Marshalls, the Aleutians, and the west coast.

James W. Downing was the commander from 1952 to 1955.

In late February 1954 Patapsco was at Enewetak Atoll. Operation Castle, a series of high-yield nuclear tests, was taking place on nearby Bikini Atoll, with the first test, Castle Bravo, scheduled for 1 March. Patapsco lacked a decontamination washdown system, and was therefore ordered, on 27 February, to return to Pearl Harbor at all possible speed. A breakdown in her engine systems, namely a cracked cylinder liner, slowed Patapsco to one-third of her full speed, and when the Castle Bravo detonation took place, she was still about 180 to 195 nautical miles east of Bikini. The Castle Bravo detonation was much larger than had originally been anticipated, and Patapsco was in the range of nuclear fallout, which began landing on the ship in the mid-afternoon of 2 March. By this time Patapsco was 565 to 586 nautical miles from ground zero. The fallout was at first thought to be harmless, there were no radiation detectors aboard, and so no decontamination measures were taken. Measurements taken after Patapsco had returned to Pearl Harbor suggested an exposure range of 0.18 to 0.62 R/hr. Total exposure estimates range from 3.3 R to 18 R of whole-body radiation, taking into account the effects of natural washdown from rain, and variations between above- and below-deck exposure.

On 2 March 1955, she departed Pearl Harbor for Astoria, Oregon, and inactivation. Decommissioning 29 June 1955, she was assigned to the Columbia River Group, Pacific Reserve Fleet until 1 July 1960 when she was struck from the Navy List and transferred to the Maritime Administration's National Defense Reserve Fleet.

=== Vietnam War ===
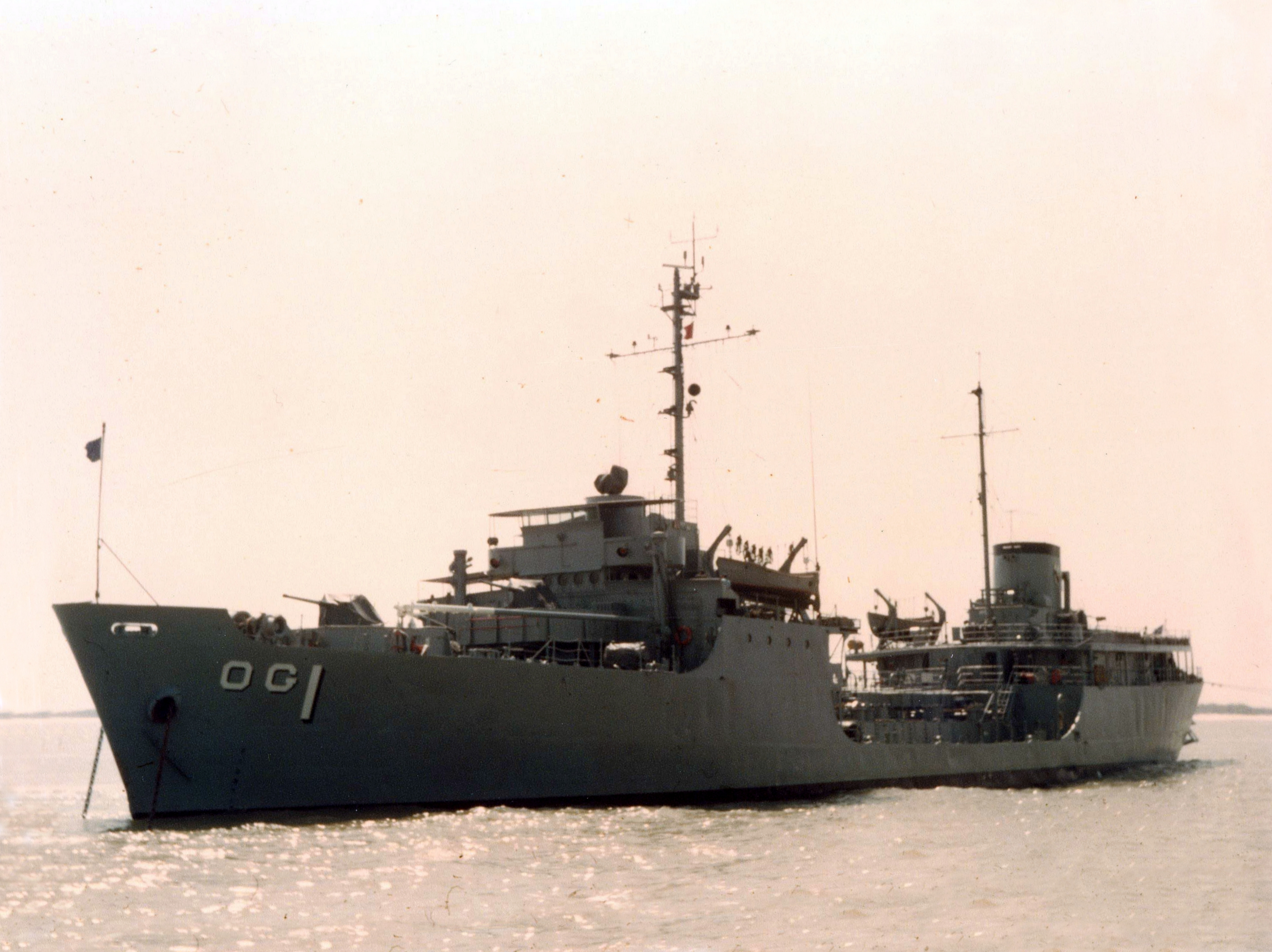
Patapsco off Cửa Việt in 1967

Reinstated on the Navy List in the fall of 1965 and recommissioned a third time 18 June 1966, Patapsco was again assigned to the Pacific Fleet and homeported at Pearl Harbor. She completed refresher training in early September and on the 26th got underway for Subic Bay, Philippines, with jet fuel, aviation gasoline, and motor gasoline, Arriving 15 October, she soon departed to deliver, once again, vital POL supplies to a combat zone. Until mid-February 1967, with interruptions for R&R at Hong Kong and availability at Subic, she operated off South Vietnam under Commander Naval Support Activity Danang, from Da Nang to Huế, and Cửa Việt.

She steamed back to Pearl Harbor, arriving 16 March. Upkeep, availability, and training and operational exercises followed and on 20 September she got underway for Guam, Subic Bay, and another tour off Vietnam. Completing that tour 25 April 1968, she remained in the Hawaiian area until 11 November, when she again headed west for duty off Vietnam. During 1969 she conducted POL support operations at Da Nang and Cửa Việt.

Patapsco was decommissioned and struck from the Naval Vessel Register on 1 August 1974. Patapsco was sold on 18 December 1979 to Mid Pacific Sea Harvesters Ltd for $56,480. She was renamed Arctic Storm and converted to a fishing trawler.

Patapsco received one battle star for her World War II service and another for Korean service.

=== After Vietnam ===
Patapsco was bought in 1979 by the owners of the fishing vessels Nordic Fury and Pacific Fury and renamed Arctic Storm. A plan to convert into a processing ship for crab fishing was abandoned as crab populations drastically declined. Arctic Storm then spent four to five years laid up in Lake Union, until local demand for North Pacific pollock and cod rose. The ship's owners entered a partnership with ProFish International, Inc. to market fishing catches into the United States. Arctic Storm was converted to catch and process into surimi, a product common in Asian markets, yet at that time was virtually unknown in the United States. Oyang Fisheries of Korea joined the partnership in early 1985, and Arctic Storm, Inc. was formed in September 1986. Arctic Storm was reconstructed by the Seattle-based Wright Schuchart Harbor Company, and entered service with the new company in January 1988.
