= Jim Parco =

American economist

James Edward Parco (born October 22, 1968) is a retired United States Air Force lieutenant colonel, professor, entrepreneur and corporate executive. While in the military, he emerged as a leading voice in the religious intolerance crisis, at the United States Air Force Academy in Colorado Springs, Colorado, United States. After leaving military service, he joined the faculty of Colorado College. In 2014, he founded Mesa Organics, a cannabis company based in Colorado, which was announced as the first merger in Colorado by a regulated cannabis operator to become a publicly traded company. Medicine Man Technologies announced the merger in 2019 which was formalized in 2020 and rebranded as Schwazze, which became the largest regulated cannabis retailer operating in Colorado and New Mexico before being acquired by Vireo in 2026.

== Background ==
Parco was born in Pueblo, Colorado and attended the United States Air Force Academy as a student. He went on to earn his Master of Business Administration from The College of William & Mary and later, his doctorate from the University of Arizona studying under Amnon Rapoport and Nobel Laureate Vernon L. Smith.

He has published widely in the fields of experimental economics, game theory and military culture.

Parco served on the National Security Council at the White House during the Clinton Administration, overseas with the American Embassy in Tel Aviv and spent two tours as a faculty member at his alma mater.

Following retirement from the military, Parco co-founded a vertically integrated adult-use cannabis company in Pueblo, Colorado in 2014 that included a retail chain of dispensaries in southeast Colorado combined with one of the largest cannabis oil producing companies in the regulated Colorado market using supercritical CO_{2} technology.

In 2016, Parco successfully engaged in a political campaign against cannabis prohibitionists to keep cannabis legal in Pueblo County, Colorado.

He served as a tenured full professor of economics and business Colorado College where he was named Teacher of the Year in 2017. He joined the Schwazze executive team following the merger as head of manufacturing and later, named president of Schwazze Biosciences.

== Social Justice at the US Air Force Academy ==
After returning from overseas in 2003, Parco resumed his teaching post at the Air Force Academy in Colorado Springs where he began forwarding evidence of systemic evangelical proselytizing to the institution's chain of command. In 2005, following the ousting of Air Force chaplain Melinda Morton, the Air Force investigated the nationally publicized religious intolerance crisis, and released a report identifying a series of problems that led to the issuance of revised religious guidelines. He later co-authored a paper with Barry Fagin in the Humanist proposing an Oath of Equal Character, and explaining the structural problems that likely led to the observed issues. In 2007, he was awarded the Thomas Jefferson National Award for the Preservation of Religious Freedom, for his efforts by the Military Religious Freedom Foundation. He was subsequently reassigned to the Air Command and Staff College in 2007 where he ended his military career teaching courses in leadership and strategy. He received the Outstanding Faculty Award from the Military Officers Association of America in 2009 and in 2010, he became the first military officer in the history of Air University to be promoted to the academic rank of full professor and later named educator of the year. He retired from active duty in 2011.

== Mesa Organics ==
In 2014, Parco and his wife founded Mesa Organics, a vertically integrated adult-use cannabis operation on the property in which is family has resided for five generations. In 2016, Parco successfully ran the "Vote No on 200" campaign to keep cannabis legal in Pueblo County. By 2018, working in conjunction with local growers, he created one of the largest supply chains for bulk cannabis oil in Colorado. In June 2019, Medicine Man Technologies signed a binding term sheet to acquire the Mesa Organics chain of dispensaries and Purplebee's, a large-scale cannabis extraction plant. Parco announced his retirement from academia to join the executive team of Schwazze in April 2020.

== Books and publications ==
Parco has authored several dozen papers and six books to include the path-breaking manuscript, "For God and Country", chronicling the growing religious fundamentalism in the US military and the first paper on the effects of pressure with supercritical CO_{2} extraction of cannabis. He is a co-author of The 52nd Floor, Echoes of Mind and The Line and a co-editor of Attitudes Aren't Free: Thinking Deeply About Diversity in the US Armed Forces (vol I), The Rise and Fall of DADT and Attitudes Aren't Free: A Call to Action (vol II).
