= Michael W. Treneer =

Michael W. Treneer (born September 6, 1947) was president of The Navigators from January 1, 2005 to April 17, 2015. He succeeded Jerry White, who had previously served as president for 18 years. He was succeeded in the leadership of the Navigators Worldwide Partnership by Mutua Mahiaini.

== Biography ==
Mike Treneer came to faith in Christ through the Navigators student ministry in England. After graduating from university as a chemical engineer, Mike continued his involvement in Navigators student work.

He and his wife Chris joined the staff of the Navigators in 1971. They led student, community, and local church-based ministries in Southampton and London in the United Kingdom.

From the mid-1970s, Mike led the team which pioneered the Navigators ministry in Nigeria. Then in 1981, Mike was appointed as the Navigators director for Africa. For sixteen years, Mike and Chris lived in Nairobi, Kenya with their three children. Mike traveled extensively throughout Africa developing African leaders, teaching the Bible, shepherding missionaries and coaching the pioneering of Navigators ministries in 20 countries. During their years in Nairobi, Mike and Chris were also deeply involved in the life of Nairobi Baptist Church where Mike was an elder and chairman of the preaching team.

In June 1998, Mike passed the leadership of the Navigators work in Africa to an African team and was appointed an international vice president of the Navigators. After a year in England, they moved to the Navigators headquarters in Colorado Springs, where they now live.

In August 2004, Mike was unanimously chosen by the International Council to succeed Jerry White as the next international president of The Navigators, effective January 1, 2005. He stepped down in April 2015 having served in the role for ten years.

Mike and Chris have devoted their lives to discipling singles and couples and have a wide experience of ministering in the United Kingdom and Africa and in many other parts of the world.

They have three adult children who are active in ministry.
