= The Navigators (organization) =

Christian para-church organization

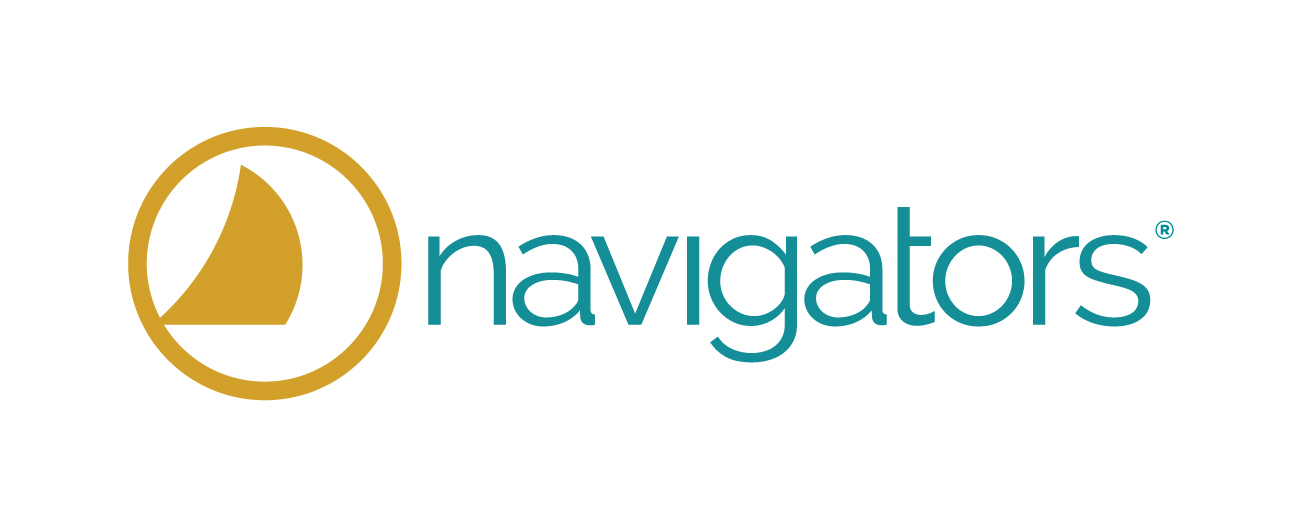
- Founded: April 1933
- Founder: Dawson E. Trotman
- Type: Christian discipleship ministry
- Location: Colorado Springs, Colorado
- Region served: 103 countries
- Product: (NavPress) books and Bible studies
- Method: one-to-one mentoring and small groups
- International president: Joe Maschhoff
- U.S. president: Marvin Campbell
- Subsidiaries: NavPress, Glen Eyrie Conference Center, Eagle Lake Camps
- Website: https://www.navigators.org

The Navigators is a worldwide Christian para-church organization based in Colorado Springs, Colorado.

== Overview ==
On May 4, 2025, Joe Maschhoff succeeded Mutua Mahiaini as the sixth International President of The Navigators. Mahiaini had been international president for 10 years, after Michael W. Treneer. Marvin Campbell is Navigators' US president.

== History ==
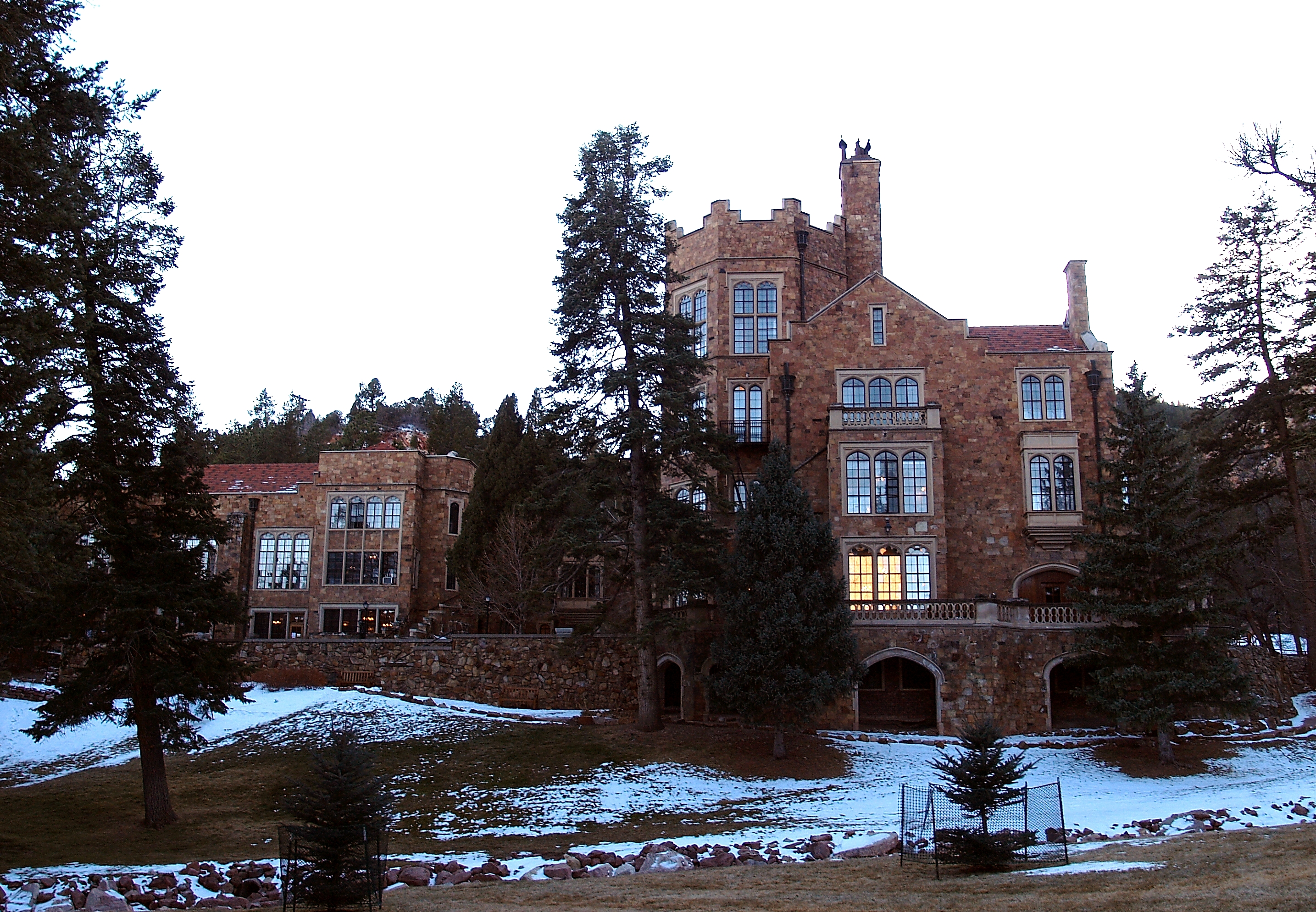
Glen Eyrie castle was purchased by The Navigators in 1953.

The Navigators was founded in 1933 by the evangelist Dawson Trotman, who mentored United States Navy sailor Lester Spencer aboard USS West Virginia. Due to those efforts, 135 additional sailors on Spencer's ship became Christians before it was sunk at Pearl Harbor. By the end of World War II, thousands of men on ships and bases around the world were learning through The Navigators.

The collegiate ministry of The Navigators was founded in 1951 at the University of Nebraska–Lincoln. This ministry was established by a group of students in the Sigma Nu fraternity house who, along with Trotman, decided to spread their outreach onto the college campus.

=== Move to Glen Eyrie ===
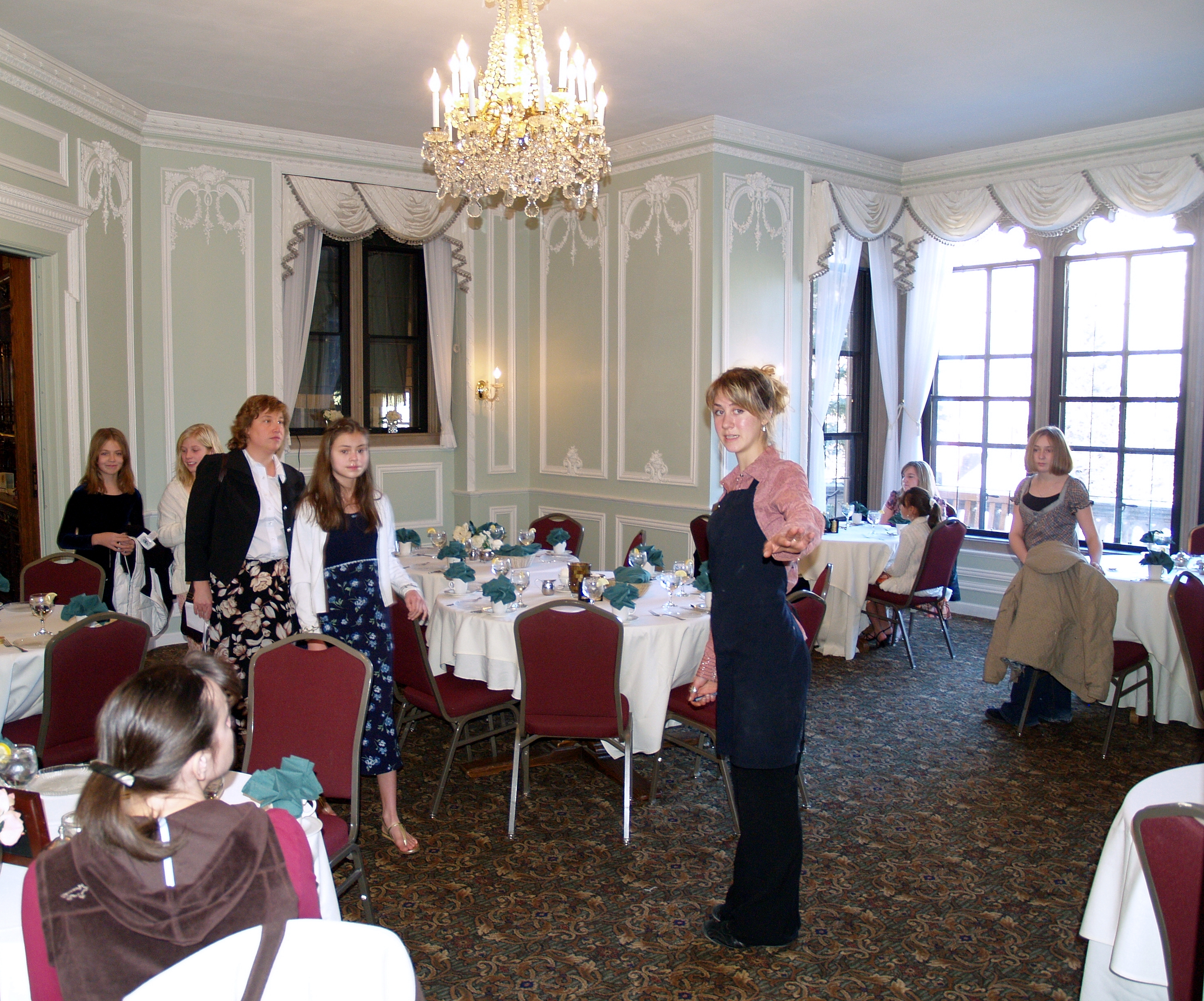
The tea room at Glen Eyrie.

In 1953, The Navigators acquired its current headquarters location at Glen Eyrie through the Billy Graham Evangelistic Association's sale of the then-vacant property to Trotman's organization. The 330-acre Eagle Lake property was included in the purchase, on the condition that it be used for youth work. In 2014, over 4,700 campers participated in Eagle Lake Camps.

The main administrative center for the Navigators is situated towards the northeast region of Glen Eyrie's territory. It serves as the main hub for coordinating their various activities and operations.

=== MRFF lawsuits ===
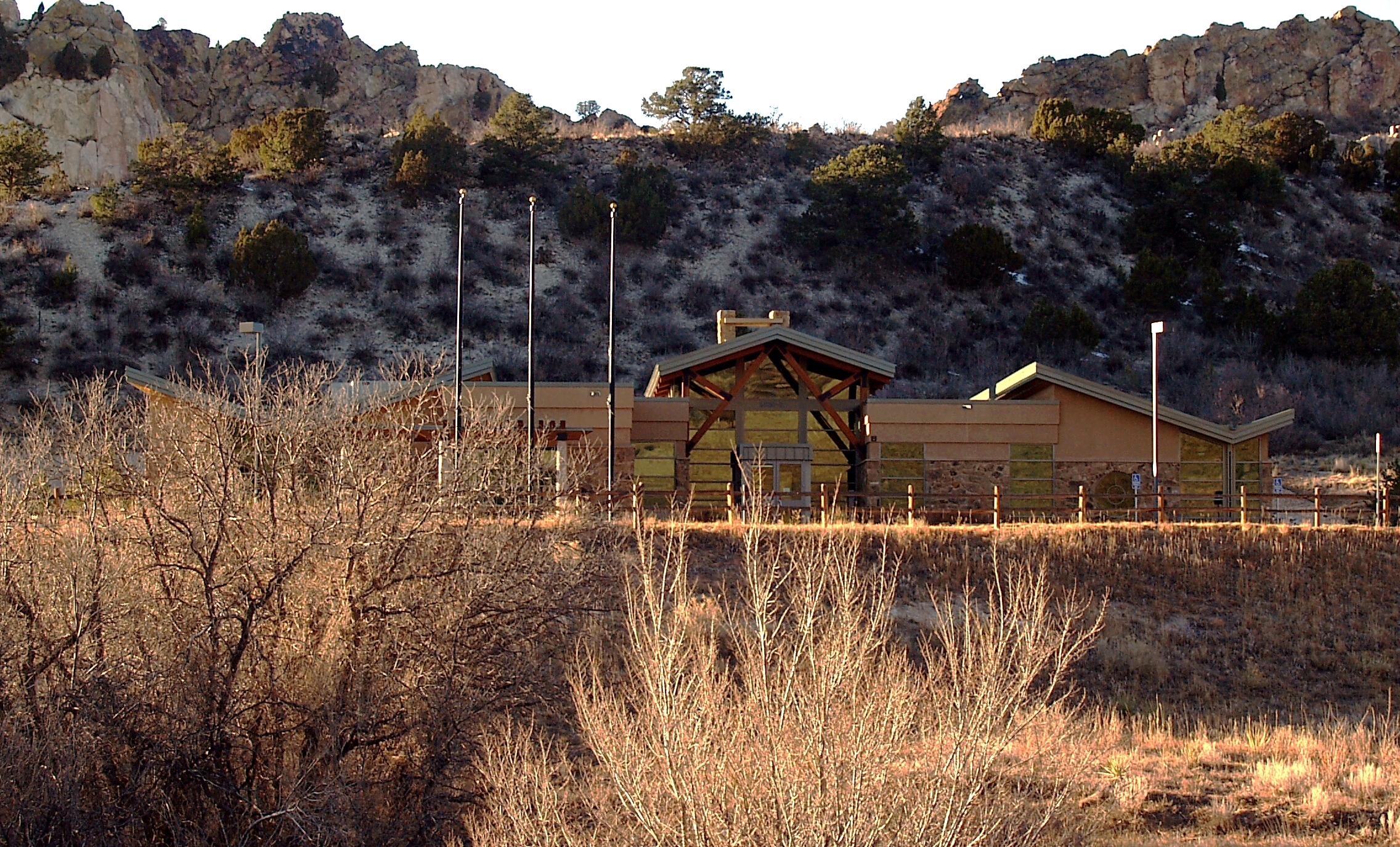
The International Office building on the grounds of Glen Eyrie.

The Navigators organization was cited in a lawsuit against the United States Air Force Academy (USAFA) by Michael L. "Mickey" Weinstein of the Military Religious Freedom Foundation (MRFF) in 2005. The lawsuit alleged that Darren and Gina Lindblom, assigned to the USAFA through The Navigators, were favored by the Air Force to the exclusion of other religious groups in violation of the Establishment Clause of the United States Constitution. This lawsuit was dismissed. Additional lawsuits by the MRFF have named The Navigators in similar complaints of alleged proselytizing in the military.

== Overseas Groups ==
The Navigators came to the UK through the Billy Graham crusades of the 1950s. They are now based in Southampton, England.

Apart from the US and the UK, the Navigators have missions in 19 other countries, including Brazil, Austria and Eurasia.
