= Jeremy Hall (businessman) =

British businessman (born 1965)

- Born: Jeremy Simon Hall; 27 January 1965 (age 61)
- Occupation: Businessman

Jeremy Simon Hall (born 27 January 1965) is a British businessman and chairman of Who's Who Publications Plc.

== Wyse Leasing ==
Hall founded Wyse Leasing in 1989, a computer leasing company. Originally based out of Chesham, Wyse Leasing grew into a £65m turnover company, employing 75 people and based out of eight offices (Chesham, Tunbridge Wells, Northampton, Sheffield, Taunton, Edinburgh, Dublin, Daventry) in the UK and Ireland.

Hall and his business partner, Wayne Fowkes sold Wyse Leasing plc to Integrity Software Inc, a NASDAQ quoted IT company, in 1998. He joined the board of the company, which in June 2000 had a stock market valuation of $150m. He later bought the company back in 2000.

Wyse Leasing (North) Limited was sold to a private investor and the management team in November 2006. The rest of Wyse Leasing was merged into one company in 2007 and later sold to CHG Meridian, a 700m euro German IT leasing company in July 2009.

== Who's Who ==
Hall is currently chairman of Who's Who Publications Plc (sometimes mistaken for the book Who's Who published since 1849 by A & C Black), a non-executive director of Manchester-based mergers and acquisitions firm Frazer Hall and CEO of asset finance organisation WestWon Ltd.
