= Jeremy Hall (United States Army) =

U.S. Army soldier (born 1985)

Jeremy Hall (born 1985) is a former United States Army Specialist and atheist.

Hall was serving in Iraq when his battalion commander asked him if he was an atheist. Hall replied "Yes". According to Hall, in the weeks and months that followed he was harassed to the point where a superior officer, Major Freddy J. Welborne, threatened to bring charges against him claiming he was violating the Uniform Code of Military Justice by organizing a meeting of the Military Association of Atheists & Freethinkers. Working with the Military Religious Freedom Foundation, Hall filed a lawsuit on September 18, 2007. The lawsuit was re-filed on March 5, 2008, to include charges of retribution.

On October 10, 2008, Jeremy Hall and the Military Religious Freedom Foundation filed a notice of voluntary dismissal.
