= Michael L. Weinstein =

American lawyer

Michael Weinstein
- Education: United States Air Force Academy (1977); McGeorge School of Law (1981)

Michael L. Weinstein (/ˈwaɪnstiːn/) is an American attorney, and former Air Force officer. Weinstein is the founder and president of the Military Religious Freedom Foundation. He is the author of two books, With God on Our Side: One Man's War Against an Evangelical Coup in America's Military and No Snowflake in an Avalanche, both of which describe purported Christian evangelical and fundamentalist proselytizing by some members of the US military.

== Military service and education ==
Weinstein graduated with honors from the United States Air Force Academy in 1977. He has stated that while at the Academy he encountered a string of incidents of psychological harassment, including notes emblazoned with swastikas and anti-Semitic slurs, death threats, and two violent incidents of hazing where he was ambushed, beaten, and, in one case, hospitalized.

Weinstein graduated from Cabrillo High School in Lompoc, California in 1973. He began his legal studies at McGeorge School of Law at the University of the Pacific. He enrolled in the university through the Air Force Law School Program shortly after his appointment as Chief of the Secure Systems Branch of the 2049th Communications and Installations Group at McClellan Air Force Base. Weinstein graduated with his Juris Doctor degree in 1981. Weinstein served as both an air force sponsored law student and a practicing JAG officer with the U.S. Air Force Judge Advocate General's Corps for over ten years.

== Legal and political career ==
Weinstein spent over three years working in the West Wing of the Reagan Administration as legal counsel in the White House. He began with an appointment to the Office of Management and Budget and was soon named the Committee Management Officer of the Iran-Contra affair in his capacity as Assistant General Counsel of The White House Office of Administration, Executive Office of the President of the United States.

Weinstein served as the first general counsel for Texas billionaire and two-time Presidential candidate H. Ross Perot and Perot Systems Corporation. He left to work full-time at the Military Religious Freedom Foundation (MRFF), a nonprofit organization he founded in March 2006. This foundation was formed as a watchdog organization to protect religious freedom in the military in accordance with Department of Defense Directive 1300.17, "Accommodation of Religious Practices Within the Military Services". As of 2024 the MRFF reported that it represented just over 90,000 active duty U.S. marines, sailors, soldiers, airmen, cadets, midshipmen, national guard, reservists and veterans, about 95% of whom self-identify as practicing Christians.

== Activism ==
Weinstein says both his sons were exposed to Christian proselytizing at the Academy. In the case of his younger son Curtis, he reported that it included anti-Semitic language and being asked "how it felt to kill Jesus". His elder son, Casey, a 2004 Academy graduate, alleged that "Senior cadets would sit down and say, 'How do you feel about the fact that your family is going to burn in hell?'"

He wrote in his autobiography (Weinstein and Seay, p. 208):

It is naturally of great personal consequence that Curtis's and Casey's encounters with religious bigotry occurred at the Academy, which is where I first encountered it as well. Of course, from a historical perspective, Jews have always had the unfortunate role of scapegoat thrust upon them. But I'm under no illusions that what happened to my Jewish sons and my Christian daughter-in-law could not have happened to the son of a patriotic American Muslim or Buddhist or agnostic or atheist. I wouldn't be surprised if it already had.

Describing his trajectory in an interview with LA Progressive that was published in April 2012, Weinstein said:

With regard to the arc of justice in my life, I started out at point A where I made a commitment that wherever I saw anti-semitism I'd stamp it out. Now I'm at point B, when I see unconstitutional religious persecution of any stripe, I don't care if I live or die, I'm not going to stand by and let it happen.

On October 6, 2005, Weinstein sued the United States Air Force for failing to prevent religious proselytizing in the U.S. Air Force. U.S. District Judge James A. Parker dismissed the case of Weinstein v. U.S. Air Force and wrote:

No Plaintiff claims to have personally experienced any of the things described under 'Factual Allegations' ... while at the Academy or after leaving the Academy. The only fair reading of Plaintiffs' factual allegations limits them to practices and events at the Academy and policies as they affect persons, other than Plaintiffs, at the Academy ... Not a single Plaintiff has alleged any personal factual situation that has allegedly impinged on that Plaintiff's constitutional rights since the Plaintiff left the Academy.

On September 17, 2007, the MRFF filed a federal lawsuit in Kansas City, Kansas, against then-Defense Secretary Robert Gates, and Major Freddy J. Welborn, accusing them of allowing a "pervasive and pernicious pattern and practice of unconstitutional religious rape of freedoms of our U.S. military". On March 5, 2008, the lawsuit was re-filed to include allegations that co-plaintiff Army Specialist Jeremy Hall was denied a promotion due to the filing of the original lawsuit.

Following the 2009 Fort Hood shooting, Weinstein suggested that proselytizing by "fundamentalist Christians" may have created a hostile environment that contributed to the psychological pressure on Major Nidal Hasan. Hasan reportedly had claimed he faced harassing insults related to his Arab ethnic background and Islamic faith.

In November 2009, the American Family Association issued the statement "No More Muslims in the US Military", which called for Muslim military enlistees to be barred from military service in the United States armed forces on the grounds that "...just as Christians are taught to imitate the life of Christ, so Muslims are taught to imitate the Prophet in all things. Yesterday, Nidal Malik Hasan was simply being a good Muslim." Weinstein's denunciation of the AFA position as "bigoted, racist, [and] vile" was featured prominently by Hatewatch, the official blog of the Southern Poverty Law Center civil rights organization.

In 2011, the US Air Force, in response to a Freedom of Information Act request submitted by the Foundation, revised a training course taught to nuclear missile launch officers which included quotations from Wernher von Braun and also cited Christian just war theory, among other materials. Radio host Michael Savage criticized Weinstein, saying, "What Weinstein doesn't know was if it was not for the warrior mentality of the Christians he hates so much, who rescued his ancestors from the ovens of Bergen-Belsen and Auschwitz, Mickey Whine-[something edited out] wouldn't be here plaguing the United States of America." Weinstein responded in a newsletter to his audience, saying that Savage's "stupefying rant" was "a rabidly ad-hominem, personal assault ... which should serve as a particularly revealing clue as to the psychological state of this specimen, a professional bottom-feeding hyena who earns his daily bread by foaming at the mouth and spreading extremist hysteria which he likely doesn't even believe himself."

In March 2011, Weinstein submitted a written testimony to the Senate Committee on the Judiciary, Subcommittee on the Constitution, Civil Rights, and Human Rights for a hearing entitled "Protecting the Civil Rights of American Muslims". He expounded on the varied complaints and injustices made by Muslim clients who have purportedly been subjected to pejoratives and racial slurs, such as "towel head", "raghead", or "camel jockey", on a regular basis. In December 2011, he resubmitted a written statement on the same subject. This statement went into more detail on the origins and effects of Islamophobia in the U.S. military. Weinstein pointed out several relatively prominent figures in the U.S. military hierarchy, particularly the chaplaincy, who advocated for what Weinstein said are Islamophobic policies and behaviors. He also pointed to an alleged culture of Dominionist Christianity as a contributor to the trend.

In January 2012, No Snowflake in an Avalanche was released. The book, co-authored by Weinstein and Davin Seay, details MRFF's prominent case studies and struggles, as well as the violent impediments that continue to be imposed against MRFF by its opponents. He supported the book release with nationwide speaking and book signing tour which includes one bookstore in Albuquerque, NM being forced by public pressure to reverse its decision to deny an in-store appearance due to "controversy" surrounding the event.

When protests broke out in various parts of Afghanistan over the improper disposal of copies of the Quran at the US military Bagram Air Base, for which the US apologized, protesters shouted "Death to America" and burned U.S. flags. In a MRFF statement, Weinstein noted that the desecrations of the Muslim holy book by U.S. personnel revealed "a fatal attitude of patronizing colonial hostility [that] has indeed been allowed to hijack the US mission in Afghanistan. By adding grist to the mill of escalating regional resentment, America's own religious extremists, racists and anti-Muslim bigots within the military have ensured that they and their comrades in arms will continue to pay the awful price in spilled blood ... the real-world consequence of this intrinsically ingrained religious prejudice and bigotry is the loss of service members' lives and limbs."

In 2012 Weinstein sued former chaplain Gordon Klingenschmitt for issuing an imprecatory prayer that he equated to a fatwa. The suit was dismissed by the judge, who stated that Weinstein failed to connect the prayer to any subsequent threats or actions against him.

Weinstein is often mistakenly characterized as an atheist, a charge he and his defenders vociferously deny on the basis of him being "a Jewish agnostic who still prays three times a day in Hebrew ... definitely not an atheist."

News sources announced that permission granted to use military emblems on Holman Military Bibles had been revoked. B&H Publishing Group being notified in 2011 that the decision was made based on new military trademark licensing issues.

In February 2013, the Air Force Academy posted a link to a homophobic site as a guide to Jewish holidays. Weinstein was contacted by around 22 AFA staff members, faculty, and cadets who asked that the link be removed. He expressed "profound bewilderment, shock, and no small amount of disgust" at the inclusion of such a website in official AFA material, calling it "Pernicious, homophobic, and clearly misogynistic." In response to Weinstein's demands the Air Force Academy spokesman, Lt. Col. John Bryan, said he wasn't sure how or why the links were included. He does say that it was most likely an oversight and that "nobody does things maliciously here."

In April 2013, Weinstein met with top-level officials in the Pentagon to discuss proselytizing in the U.S. military and the role of the chaplaincy. He called it a "national security threat ... spiritual rape ... sedition and treason." In an interview with the Washington Post after that meeting, Weinstein blamed military and political leadership for the abundance of proselytizing going on the military today. Weinstein again claimed the culture in the military is misogynistic, anti-Semitic, and Islamophobic and that the chain of command is compliant to this culture.

In October 2013, Lt. Colonel Chaplain Stephen W. Austin contacted Weinstein on October 8, 2013, regarding initial development and implementation of a spirit(ual) dimension component to a U.S. Army soldier resilience platform called ArmyFit. Lt. Col. Austin requested MRFF's advice and review "as we progress in the development of this dimension. Your opinion matters and we would like to work collaboratively on a topic that is clearly complex and sensitive."

In December 2013, Weinstein was contacted by a Jewish member of a State National Guard regarding specific actions taken against him by his chain of command in response to his religious beliefs. The Brigadier-General of the State's National Guard initiated an investigation into the claims made. The investigation resulted in several high-ranking members of the chain of command being fired, reprimanded, or going back into training.

On November 7, 2014, the U.S. Air Force created controversy when it updated its rules on religious neutrality. Two instances in particular were the focus of intense debate. First, the new draft dropped language that required airmen to "avoid the actual or apparent use of their position to promote their personal religious beliefs to subordinates or extend preferential treatment for any religion." And second, the new draft changed language that stated, "Airmen, especially commanders and supervisors, must ensure that in exercising their right of religious free expression, they do not degrade morale, good order, and discipline in the Air Force", to language that stated, "expression of sincerely held beliefs (conscience, moral principles, or religious beliefs) shall not be prohibited unless the expression would have a real, not hypothetical, adverse impact on military readiness, unit cohesion, good order and discipline, health and safety, and mission accomplishment." Weinstein claimed instances of the new language severely weakened the rules on religious neutrality and opened the door to discriminatory language, particularly towards LGBT airmen, being protected as sincerely held religious beliefs.

On November 19, 2014, Weinstein appeared before the Military Personnel Subcommittee to testify on the current state of religion in the military. After Weinstein's opening statements he was questioned regarding some statements he had made in the past by Rep. Randy Forbes (R-VA). Following that, Rep. Walter B. Jones Jr. (R-NC) asked a series of questions to Weinstein asking that he respond with "fair" or "unfair". Weinstein took severe issue with this line of questioning and his responses caused Rep. Jones to leaves the chamber before recess was called.

In October 2015, Weinstein sent a letter to Lt. Col. Don Tasker, the commanding officer of the 436th Force Support Squadron at Dover Air Force Base, to report that one of Tasker's subordinates was illegally using her official government email to endorse and encourage participation in Operation Christmas Child, an annual charitable event created and led by Samaritan's Purse that explicitly endorses the Christian faith and encourages evangelization for that faith. Shortly after receipt of this letter, Tasker disavowed the email and stated, "I want to be absolutely clear that the email in question was not sent at my direction and is not endorsed in any way by me or any level of command."

In October 2015, Weinstein was contacted regarding a practice of a regional supervisor at the U.S. Army Corps of Engineers Directorate of Contracting. This supervisor signed his emails with various Bible quotes, a practice in violation of the U.S. Military's rules on religious neutrality. Weinstein successfully demanded the practice cease and the supervisor be disciplined.

In January 2016, eight U.S. Air Force officers contacted Weinstein concerning an explicitly religious speech given by a new commanding officer at their base:

Understand this. I am always a devoted Christian first and foremost. I was brought to Christ at the Air Force Academy and walk with him [sic] daily. I am a family man second and thirdly an Air Force Officer. I'm not saying that you need to be like me but I have found that specific order in my life to be the best path for success. And I emphasize the word specific. I want you all to know who I am and how I see my walk in this world. I want all of you to succeed as I have.

This speech was followed by an invitation to silent prayer for the entire gathered base. Weinstein intervened and rendered assistance to the eight officers in the form of contacting the chain of command. The officer received a reprimand and sent a personal apology letter to the eight officers who contact Weinstein.

In February 2016, Weinstein was instrumental in the functional demotion of a Pentagon fitness blog writer, Colonel Thomas Hundley. The writer in question published a post recommending various Christian exercises, including prayer, as a way to increased fitness. Weinstein and his non-profit foundation MRFF filed a complaint with Army Regional Health Command at Fort Belvoir, Virginia after being informed of the post by several military service members. In the complaint, Weinstein accused Col. Hundley of "conflating his Army officer rank, title, and position with his professed evangelical Christian faith." Several days later the Defense Health Agency (DHA), released a brief notice informing readers that Col. Hundley was no longer a featured writer and they were "expanding the pool of writers ..."

A football game between West Point and Temple University in September 2016 ended in controversy as the head coach of the West Point team, Jeff Monken, had the team gather around and participate in a prayer in celebration of their upset victory. After the game, a video was posted online showing the prayer. That video was removed shortly after the controversy arose and was replaced by one that depicted an abridged version of the team's locker room celebration. A parent of one of the students said that "Coach Monken had no business telling my son and his Army teammates to get on their knees and pray a prayer to Jesus! My son was very upset about this. ... This violates the Constitution and to think it happened at West Point?" Weinstein, upon hearing of the incident, stated, "We want three things, an admission that there was a mistake, an apology, and assurances that this won't happen again." Coach Monken apologized to his players and assured that the behavior would not be repeated.

In December 2016, an Air Force Academy coach was using his Twitter account to post religious quotes. Weinstein, via the Military Religious Freedom Foundation, filed a request for an official investigation into the coach to verify the tweets, and to discipline the coach if the allegations proved to be true. The tweets were removed from the account and the coach was ordered to display an appropriate disclaimer on his personal Twitter to denote that it is not an official Academy account.

In 2011, Weinstein filed a FOIA request with USAFA for records regarding himself and his family, several of whom also graduated from the academy. After four years of "processing delays", he filed a lawsuit through the MRFF in 2015. The two-year legal battle ended with USAFA producing over 8,000 documents regarding Weinstein and MRFF, conducting new searches, expanding the date range of new searches, and paying legal fees MRFF incurred during the proceedings.

In February 2017, Weinstein was contacted by five U.S. Army soldiers concerning a statement made by their CO, who had reportedly stated that "it was the army's priority to come to the Lord Jesus Christ." The soldiers contacted Weinstein and MRFF because their unit had many non-Christian soldiers serving in it, several of whom took offense to the above statement. Weinstein contacted the commander's superiors and the commander was ordered to desist from engaging in the objectionable behavior.

Weinstein and the National Organization for Women cooperated in February 2017 to remove posters from the lobby of Air Combat Command at Joint Base Langley-Eustis in Virginia. The posters prominently featured the quote:

Men cannot live without faith except for brief moments of anarchy or despair. Faith leads to conviction – and convictions lead to action. It is only a man of deep convictions, a man of deep faith, who will make the sacrifices needed to save his manhood ... It is obvious that our enemy will attack us at our weakest spot. The hole in our armor is our lack of faith. We need to revive a fighting faith by which we can live, and for which we would be willing even to die. It is the only way that we shall be able to get meaning back into our lives. It is our only safety in all this muddled world. AF Manual 50-21, August 1955.
The idea uppermost in the minds of the men who founded the United States was that each and every human being was important. They knew that the importance of man came from the very source of his life – because man was made in the image and likeness of God, he had a destiny to achieve. And because he had a destiny to achieve, he had the unalienable rights and the inherent freedom to achieve it. That is the basic idea of our democracy. That is the keystone of our way of living. Discard that central thought and there is no meaning to our Declaration of Independence; there is no validity to our Constitution. AF Manual 50-21, August 1955.

Complaints were submitted on February 7, and the posters were removed later that month.

== Awards and recognition ==
In 2006, Weinstein was named by The Jewish Daily Forward in the "Forward 50", a list of those it considers to be the most influential Jews in America. He received the Buzzflash Wings of Justice Award. Jews for Racial and Economic Justice awarded him its Rabbi Marshall T. Meyer Risk-Taker Award for taking extraordinary risks in pursuit of justice.

In December 2012, Weinstein was named one of the "100 Most Influential People in U.S. Defense" by Defense News.

== Criticism ==
Weinstein has been accused of "waging a war on Christianity" by some critics. He has described "gangs of fundamentalist Christian monsters who terrorize their fellow Americans by forcing their weaponized and twisted version of Christianity upon their helpless subordinates", and has said that the vast majority of his clients are practicing Catholics and mainline Protestants.

Weinstein has come under criticism for his salary and practice of voting on his own compensation as he is one of the voting members of MRFF's three-member board. According to Weinstein, although he is a voting board member, he abstains from any votes on his own salary and has always done so. Supporters have noted this criticism comes from the same media source which had named Weinstein one of the 100 Most Influential People in U.S. Defense in December 2012 and that the study upon which this criticism was based noted, "If you come across a charity whose CEO pay is higher than other similar charities, don't immediately dismiss that charity's request for funding. You're better off supporting a charity that is fiscally efficient, accountable and transparent, achieving its programmatic goals and paying its CEO well, than a charity that has substandard fiscal health, fails to live up to its mission, but under-pays its CEO." This compensation policy for charity CEOs has been expressed by other reputable sources.

Jews in Green, a Jewish military support group, has challenged some of his claims, such as an entrenched anti-Semitism in the military, calling them baseless.

== Personal background ==
Weinstein and his wife have two sons and one daughter. Weinstein graduated from the McGeorge School of Law at University of the Pacific (United States) in 1981.

== Media ==
Weinstein appeared in the film adaptation of James Carroll's Constantine's Sword.

Weinstein has appeared on major cable and network TV news networks and is a frequent guest on national radio networks. He has written for The Washington Post, AlterNet, and Truthout. His activism has been covered in such media as CNN, The New York Times, The Washington Post, The Los Angeles Times The Nation, The Guardian, and Time Magazine.

== Bibliography ==
- Michael L. Weinstein and Davin Seay, With God on Our Side: One Man's War Against an Evangelical Coup in America's Military (Thomas Dunne Books, 2006)
- Michael L. Weinstein and Davin Seay, No Snowflake in an Avalanche (Rare Bird Books, 2012)
