= Glen Eyrie =

Historic house in Colorado, United States

- Glen Eyrie Castle
- U.S. National Register of Historic Places
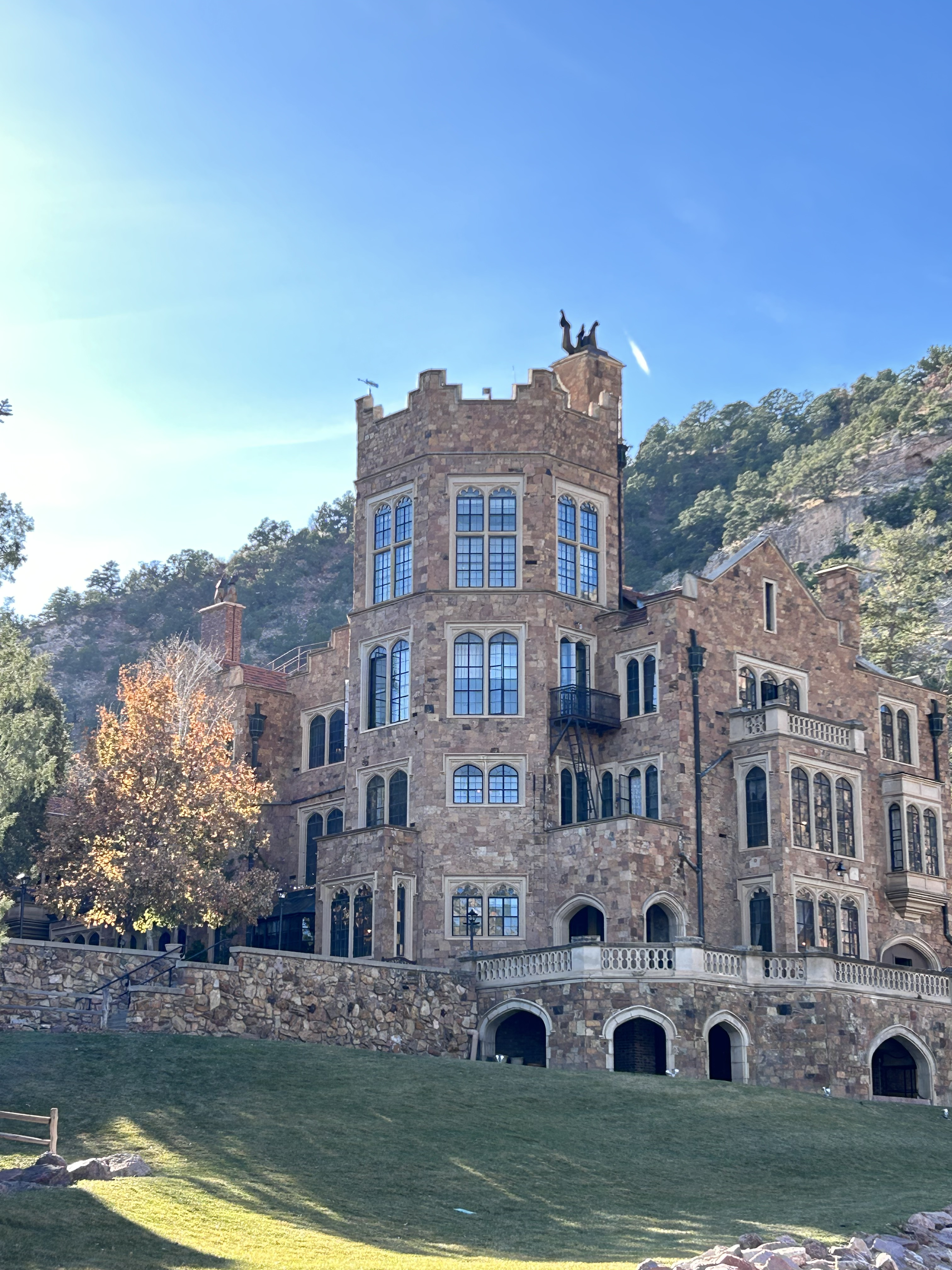
- Location: Colorado Springs, Colorado
- Coordinates: 38°53′30″N 104°53′04″W
- Built: 1871
- Architect: Frederick Sterner
- Architectural style: Tudor Revival
- Website: gleneyrie.org
- NRHP reference No.: 75000519 (original); 16000866 (increase)

Significant dates
- Added to NRHP: April 21, 1975
- Boundary increase: December 20, 2016

Glen Eyrie is an English Tudor-style castle built in 1871 by General William Jackson Palmer, the founder of Colorado Springs. The castle is owned today by The Navigators, a worldwide Christian organization. It is open for public tours and events and can be rented for private programs.

== History ==
Founded in 1871, Glen Eyrie was the home of William Jackson Palmer. Palmer was a Brigadier General in the Union Army during the American Civil War, president of the Denver and Rio Grande Railroad, and founder of Colorado Springs. Palmer and his wife Mary “Queen” Mellen made Glen Eyrie their home. They had three daughters, Elsie, Dorothy, and Marjorie.

General Palmer died in 1909, and the Palmer sisters left the estate untouched for several years before finally selling it. The estate changed hands several times. In 1938 the property was purchased by an oil baron from Texas, George Strake.

The Strake family turned Glen Eyrie into their summer home, repairing and building up the property. However, the flood of 1949 wreaked havoc on the land, and with their children now grown, they determined to put Glen Eyrie back on the market.

Glen Eyrie was purchased as the headquarters of The Navigators in 1953, following a campaign to raise the down payment of $100,000 in only six weeks.

The castle has several features that were advanced for its time, including a primitive intercom system and a two chimney system operated by a lever that would direct the smoke depending on what direction the wind was blowing to take the smoke out of the valley. In case of fires there were also fire hose stations placed throughout the castle. There are 24 fireplaces.

Glen Eyrie is on the National Register of Historic Places.

== Today ==
Today the Navigators maintain Glen Eyrie as their headquarters.

The Castle is available for tours, events, and overnight stays, with guest rooms, meeting rooms and dining rooms and six lodges on the property available for overnight stays.

The Castle has an afternoon tea service in the Music Room, as well as an annual Christmas Madrigal Banquet in the Great Hall.

Common wildlife sightings include the largest bighorn sheep herd in the state of Colorado, wild turkeys, deer, and a variety of birds of prey. The name “Eyrie” means “eagle’s nest.”

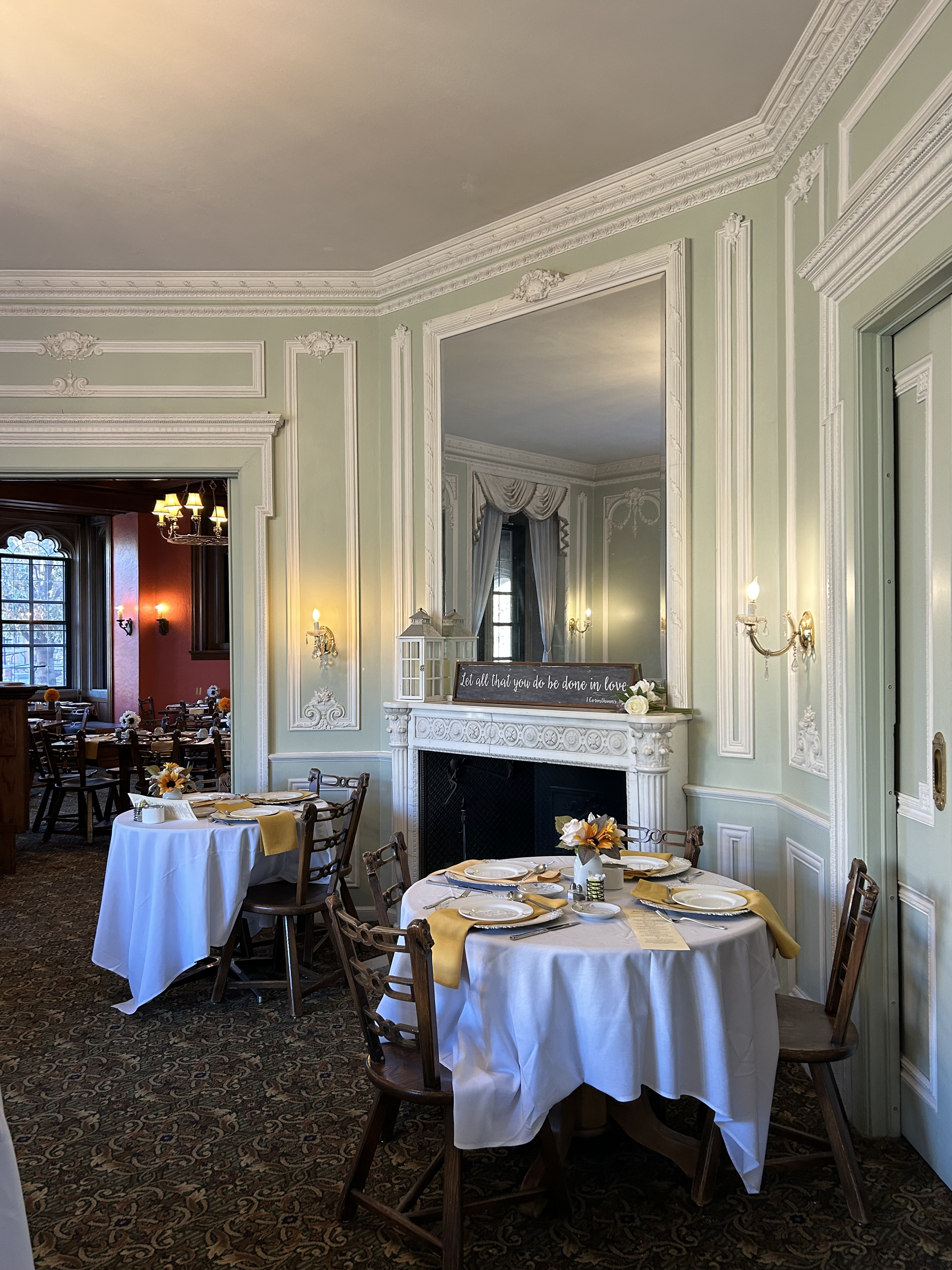
Glen Eyrie Castle Music Room, where afternoon tea is served.

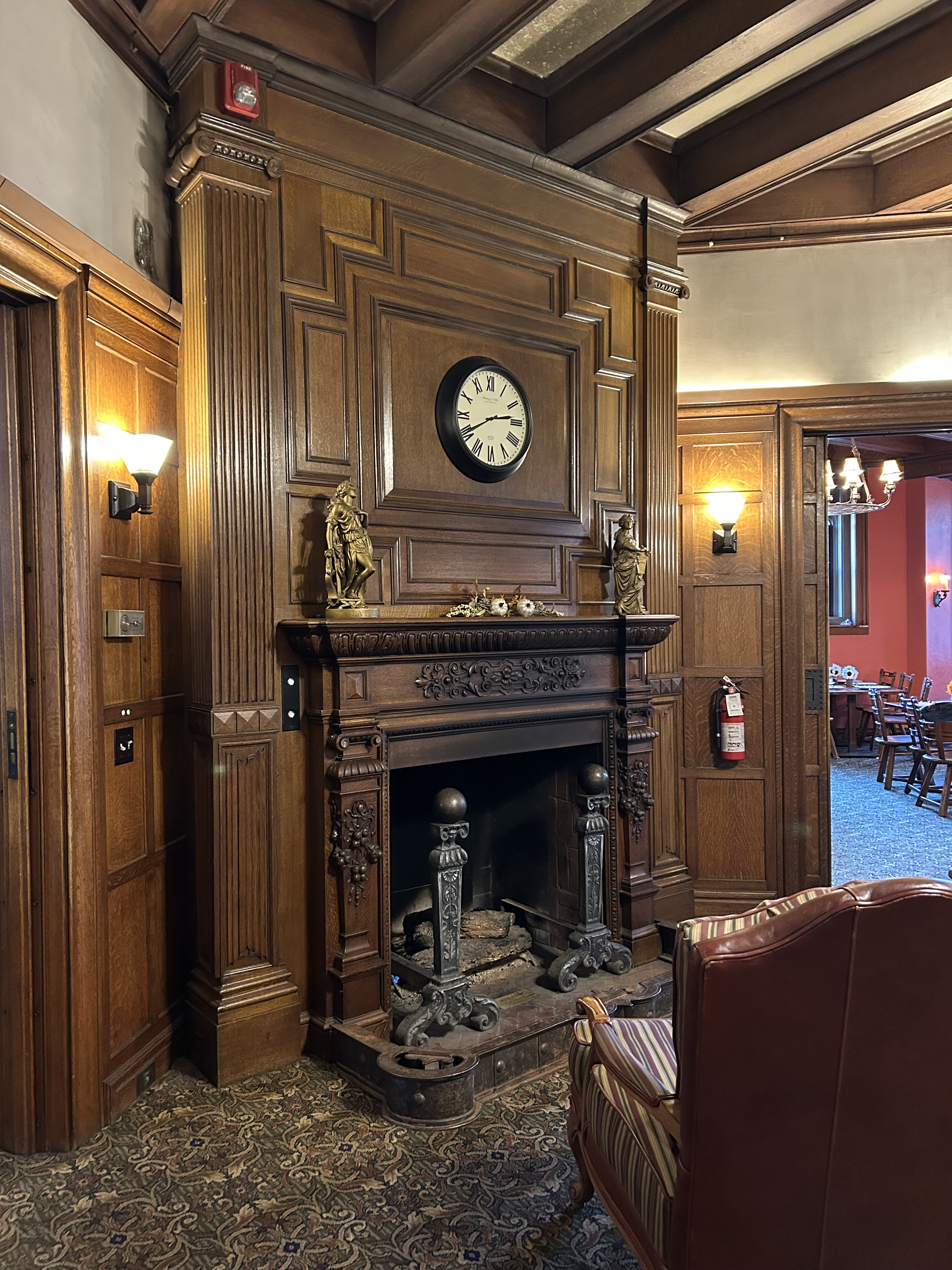
Glen Eyrie Castle fireplace

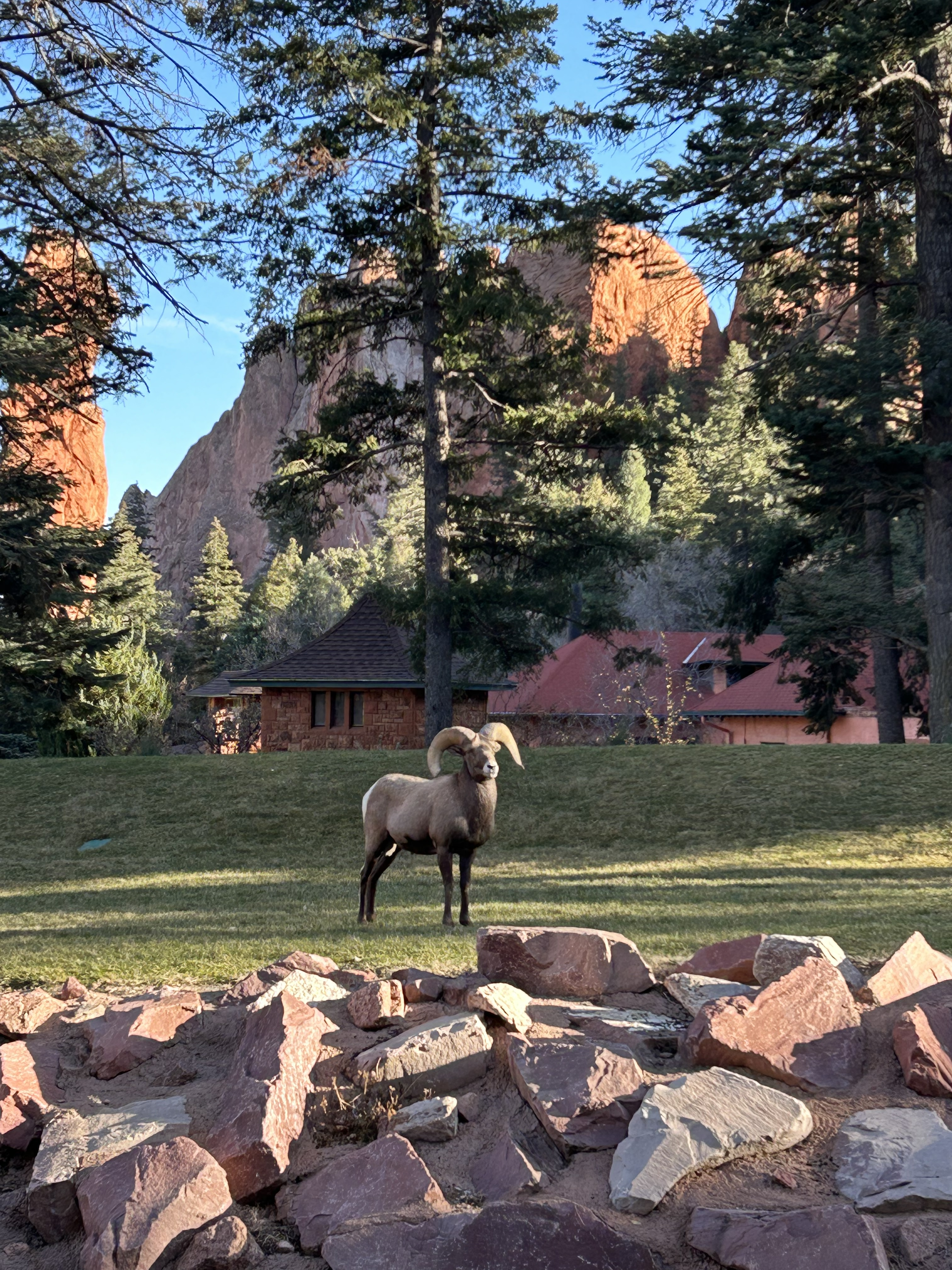
Bighorn sheep on Glen Eyrie Castle lawn

== See also ==
- National Register of Historic Places listings in El Paso County, Colorado
