= Dawson Trotman =

American evangelist (1906–1956)

Dawson Earle Trotman (March 25, 1906 – June 18, 1956) was an evangelist and founder of the Navigators.

== Biography ==
Trotman was born on March 25, 1906, in Bisbee, Arizona, US.

=== Ministry ===
Trotman founded the Navigators in 1933. He lost his life on June 18, 1956, aged 50, while rescuing a girl, Allene Beck, from drowning during water-skiing in Schroon Lake, New York.

Trotman worked with many other evangelicals of his day, including Henrietta Mears, Jim Rayburn, Charles E. Fuller, Bill Bright, Billy Graham, and Dick Hillis. Lorne Sanny (1920–2005) succeeded him as president of the Navigators after Trotman's wife Lila was its short-term interim president.

== Personal life ==
Trotman married Lila Mae Clayton on July 3, 1932. Lila, who was born on December 12, 1913, in Buffalo Valley, Tennessee, died on October 27, 2004, at the age of 90. The couple had five children.

== Bibliography ==
- Downing, James (2008). Living Legacy: Reflections on Dawson Trotman and Lorne Sanny (paperback). NavPress. ISBN 978-0972902380.
- Foster, Robert (2012). The Navigator (paperback). NavPress. ISBN 978-1612912769.
- Robertson, Jr., Lee Roy (2002). Developing a Heart for Mission: Five Missionary Heroes (paperback). NavMedia. ISBN 978-9810474256.
- Skinner, Betty Lee (1974). Daws: The Story of Dawson Trotman, Founder of the Navigators (paperback). Zondervan. ISBN 0-310-32801-2.
- The Navigators, ed. (2011). Dawson Trotman: In His Own Words (paperback). NavPress. ISBN 978-1617479212.
