= Military Religious Freedom Foundation =

American non-profit organization

- Formation: 2005
- Founder: Michael L. Weinstein
- Founded at: Albuquerque, New Mexico
- Type: 501(c)(3) nonprofit organization
- Purpose: Separation of church and state within the US military
- Region served: United States
- Website: militaryreligiousfreedom.org

The Military Religious Freedom Foundation (MRFF) is a 501(c)(3) non-profit organization that was founded in 2005 by Michael L. Weinstein, a former Air Force officer and attorney. The organization's mission is to ensure that members of the United States Armed Forces are able to practice their religious beliefs without fear of discrimination or coercion, and to promote the separation of church and state within the military.

== History ==
The organization was founded by United States Air Force Academy (USAFA) graduate and former USAF Judge Advocate General's Corps officer Michael Weinstein in 2005 for the purpose of opposing the spread of alleged religious intimidation by Christians in positions of power within the US military. The founding was driven by the experiences of Weinstein and his sons, who were discriminated against at the Air Force Academy due to their Jewish faith. He described the group's target audience as, "a small subset of Christian fundamentalism that's called premillennial, dispensational, reconstructionist, dominionist, fundamentalist, or just Dominionist Christianity". He further characterized their antagonism as, "incredibly well-funded gangs of fundamentalist Christian monsters who terrorize their fellow Americans by forcing their weaponized and twisted version of Christianity upon their helpless subordinates in our nation's armed forces".

On September 11, 2012, advisory board member Glen Doherty, a Roman Catholic, died in the U.S. Consulate attack in Benghazi, Libya. MRFF founder Weinstein said that Doherty had "helped me on many MRFF client cases behind the scenes to facilitate assistance to armed forces members abused horribly by fundamentalist Christian proselytizing."

In 2015, the group asked the United States Congress to hold oversight hearings regarding its allegation of the Defense Department's failure to abide by separation of Church and State.

== Work ==
From its inception, the MRFF has advocated for many active duty U.S. servicemen/women and veterans who have contacted them regarding alleged religious discrimination, harassment, and aggressive proselytizing by Fundamentalist Christians. As of 2024, the MRFF reports that it represents over 88,000 active duty U.S. Marines, sailors, soldiers, airmen, cadets, midshipmen, national guard members, reservists, and veterans, about 95% of whom self-identify as practicing Christians. Of the remaining 4%, MRFF represents Jewish, Buddhist, Hindu, Sikh, Native American Spiritualist, Humanist, Pagan, Atheist, slightly over 18% of all Muslim Americans in the U.S. military, other minority faith, and non-faith military members, and slightly under 1,000 LGBT military members.

MRFF has filed multiple federal lawsuits against the Pentagon and the Secretary of Defense, with military members as co-plaintiffs, asserting a pattern and practice of constitutionally impermissible promotions of religion by the military. MRFF founder Weinstein has spoken to students at the U.S. Air Force Academy's National Character and Leadership Symposium, the Air Force JAG School, the Air Command and Staff College, and the US Army War College.

=== Notable cases ===
==== 2005–2010 ====
Jewish veteran Akiva David Miller, who alleged he had suffered religious discrimination and aggressive Christian proselytization while receiving care at the Iowa City, Iowa V.A. Medical Center beginning in 2005 was a client of the MRFF.

In 2006 the MRFF criticized a promotional video by Christian Embassy (an offshoot of the evangelical Campus Crusade for Christ) which was filmed in the Pentagon and featured uniformed generals. Following a MRFF-requested internal investigation carried out by the Department of Defense Office of the Inspector General, the report concluded that several violations of Defense Department policy were committed during the production of the promotional video. Chief among the violations was the obtaining of permission to film the video at the Pentagon by means of a willful "[mischaracterization] of the purpose and proponent of the video" by Chaplain (Colonel) Ralph G. Benson, as well as the acts of officers who used their name, rank, and uniforms as a means towards endorsing the Christian Embassy proselytizing message.

In February 2009, Colonel Kimberly Toney, commander of the USAF's 501st Combat Support Wing sent an email with a link to a religious-themed web video about the life story of Nick Vujicic. The sponsoring site of the video, 4marks.com, is a Catholic website. USAF service members who looked at the site after following the emailed link complained that the site contained criticism of President Barack Obama. Weinstein said the incident represented a textbook case of improper religious influence and added, "There's a pervasive pattern of constitutional abuse when you have a wing commander who sends out a direct, proselytizing e-mail with a link to a Web site that slanders the president of the United States."

Following the Fort Hood shooting in November 2009, the religious right American Family Association issued the statement "No More Muslims in the US Military", which explicitly stated that Muslim military enlistees be barred from military service in the United States armed forces on the grounds that "... just as Christians are taught to imitate the life of Christ, so Muslims are taught to imitate the Prophet in all things. Yesterday, Nidal Malik Hasan was simply being a good Muslim." Weinstein's denunciation of the AFA position as "bigoted, racist, [and] vile" was featured prominently by Hatewatch, the official blog of the Southern Poverty Law Center civil rights organization.

The MRFF initiated the January 2010 media coverage of the "Jesus rifles" controversy, when rifle scopes manufactured by US government contractor Trijicon were discovered to be engraved with scripture citations. Within a week of an ABC News report regarding the situation, Trijicon announced that it would halt the engraving of the biblical inscriptions on all products sold to the government.

Pressure on United States Air Force Academy Superintendent Lt Gen Michael C. Gould throughout 2010 resulted in the release of the bi-annual Academy Climate Survey's results. The survey revealed that 41% of non-Christian cadets and 19% of all cadets were allegedly subjected to unwanted proselytizing.

==== 2011–2016 ====
In January 2011, the MRFF demanded that the US Army cease and desist their policy of administering a "spiritual fitness" component to the mandatory Comprehensive Soldier Fitness program test, whereby soldiers' combat readiness and ability are judged on the basis of their religiosity. MRFF criticized the fact that evangelical Christian rock concerts were being organized and funded under the auspices of the Spiritual Fitness program.

MRFF litigation sparked by a prayer luncheon hosted by the US Air Force Academy's chaplain service (which featured retired Marine Corps Lt. and fundamentalist Christian Clebe McClary as keynote speaker) was reviewed by a federal judge in February 2011. U.S. District Judge Christine Arguello ruled the plaintiffs (which included the MRFF and USAFA professor David Mullin) lacked sufficient legal standing to challenge the event.

The United States Air Force, in response to the pressure caused by the release of internal training material via a Freedom of Information Act request, revised the ethical indoctrination course material to which nuclear missile launch officers were exposed as a standard component of their training. The course was defended by a spokesman for the Air Force's Air Education and Training Command as a means of "[helping] folks understand why we're doing what we're doing". Included in the course was a PowerPoint presentation which allegedly contained a Christian militarist perspective, heavily quoted Judeo-Christian scripture, and contained a synopsis of the just war theory of St. Augustine of Hippo. The PowerPoint also contained a slide excerpting the words of former Nazi Party member, SS Sturmbannführer, Wernher von Braun, who is quoted as stating: "We wanted to see the world spared another conflict such as Germany had just been through and we felt that only by surrendering such a weapon [the ballistic missile] to people who are guided by the Bible could such an assurance to the world best be secured," in reference to his 1945 surrender to American occupation forces and subsequent recruitment by the United States Office of Strategic Services via Operation Paperclip. In September 2011, Senator John Cornyn (R-TX) encouraged the Air Force to resume the class.

Following the MRFF threatening suit over the "Crusaders" name and cross and shield logo for the Marine Fighter Attack Squadron VMFA-122, the Marine Deputy Commandant for Aviation directed VMFA-122 to revert the unit's identification back to the previous name and logo "Werewolves," on May 24, 2012.

On October 8, 2013, Lieutenant Colonel Chaplain Stephen W. Austin directly contacted Weinstein regarding the initial development and implementation of a spiritual dimension component for a U.S. Army soldier resilience platform.

In October 2013, MRFF exposed close ties between dominionist groups meeting with DoD officials and a fundamentalist leader calling for a military takeover of the U.S. Government. On October 3, 2013, MRFF Senior Research Director Chris Rodda reported in the Huffington Post and DailyKos on the extremely close ties between the Restore Military Religious Freedom (RMRF) coalition, the Family Research Council, and Rick Joyner, the head of MorningStar Ministries/Heritage International Ministries who proposed a "military takeover" of the U.S. Government on September 30, 2013. MRFF filed a FOIA request on September 23, 2013, regarding a meeting on September 12 of the previous year between representatives of the RMRF and the DoD.

In November 2013, MRFF demanded on behalf of 27 lesbian/gay/bisexual clients that the U.S. Air Force Academy fire "ex-Gay" fundamentalist Christian Mike Rosebush, who claimed he could "cure" gays.

In September 2014, pressure from MRFF and allies forced the U.S. Air Force to rescind an unlawful requirement that enlistees state "So Help Me God" in their enlistment oath. Airmen were allowed to omit the phrase until October 2013 when the U.S. Air Force changed their interpretation of 10 USC 502, 5 USC 3331, and Title 32. On September 17, 2014, the Air Force News Service (AFNS) reported that an opinion from the Department of Defense General Counsel would allow an individual to "strike or omit the words 'So help me God' from an enlistment or appointment oath if preferred".

In October 2014, MRFF exposed the Army ROTC program's unconstitutional restrictions against non-Christians. An active duty U.S. Army officer informed MRFF that a list of available "broadening assignments" (i.e. assignments available to captains who have completed their required course and stint as a company commander) contained a listing for the position of Assistant Professor of Military Science for the ROTC program at Wheaton College which required that applicants "Must Be Of Christian Faith", a violation of Article VI, Clause 3 of the Constitution, which states: "No religious Test shall ever be required as a Qualification to any Office or public Trust under the United States".

In January 2015, a Special Forces recruiting poster for "God's Mission" was removed after MRFF's intervention.

In November 2015, MRFF's action forced the Fort Carson Post Exchange (PX) to remove anti-Islamic t-shirts from its retail shelves. The shirts depicted the Statue of Liberty wearing a hijab and holding the Quran on her left arm superimposed over a golden crescent and the statement "Don't let this happen America."

In 2016, MRFF Action leads to the removal of unconstitutional sectarian religious text from POW/MIA "Missing Man" tables at five federal facilities.

==== 2020s ====
The MRFF announced on March 3, 2026, that they had received more than 200 complaints by US military personnel against commanders invoking extremist Christian eschatological themes to prepare troops for the 2026 Iran war, with one commander saying that "President Trump has been anointed by Jesus to light the signal fire in Iran to cause Armageddon and mark his return to Earth."

== Recognition ==
In September 2008, the California Council of Churches IMPACT (CCCI), a public policy advocacy organization that represents numerous mainstream Christian and Orthodox Christian communities, formally announced its endorsement of the MRFF's mission. CCCI Board President Rev. John Freeseman stated "Our alignment with the Military Religious Freedom Foundation is on behalf of religious freedom for all people, regardless of belief or non-belief. It is not the function of the U.S. Military to proselytize our troops but to protect our constitutional freedoms."

MRFF Senior Research Director Chris Rodda was invited to contribute an essay on religious expression in the military to the discursive 2010 volume "Attitudes Aren't Free: Thinking Deeply About Diversity in the US Armed Forces" published by Air University Press, the publishing arm of the Air University at Maxwell Air Force Base.

In December 2012, Weinstein was named #95 of the "100 Most Influential People in U.S. Defense" by Defense News.

== Criticism ==
MRFF founder Weinstein has come under criticism for his salary, which exceeds the average for non-profit organizations. As one of the voting members of the MRFF's three-member board as of 2014, he had voted on his own compensation. In 2012, he received total compensation worth US$273,355 according to Internal Revenue Service filings accessed on the nonprofit transparency website, GuideStar. According to the MRFF, however, Weinstein does not vote on his own salary. As of 2025 the MRFF has a 96% passing grade from Charity Navigator on its finances and accountability.
