= Henrietta Mears =

Christian educator and evangelist (1890–1963)

- Born: 23 October 1890; Fargo, North Dakota, U.S.
- Died: 20 March 1963 (aged 72); Bel Air, Los Angeles, California, U.S.
- Education: B.A., University of Minnesota (1913)
- Occupations: Christian educator; evangelist; author
- Known for: Director of Christian Education at First Presbyterian Church of Hollywood; founding of Gospel Light Publications, Forest Home conference center
- Notable work: What the Bible Is All About (1953)

Henrietta Cornelia Mears (October 23, 1890 – March 20, 1963) was a Christian educator, evangelist, and author who had a significant impact on evangelical Christianity in the 20th century and was one of the founders of the National Sunday School Association. Best known as the innovative and dynamic Director of Christian Education at First Presbyterian Church of Hollywood, California, and in charge of the church's college and young adult programs in the mid-1900s, she built a dedicated, enthusiastic staff, trained and mentored her teachers and implemented a graded, age-appropriate curriculum from "cradle roll" to adults.

== Early life and education ==
Henrietta Cornelia Mears was born on October 23, 1890, in Fargo, North Dakota. She was the seventh child of banker E. Ashley Mears and Baptist laywoman Margaret Burtis Everts (died 1910 or 1911), then aged 42.

Her father, E. Ashley Mears, was the President of First Bank of North Dakota and sold mortgages to private investors. At the height of his business, he owned approximately 20 banks. The family's wealth was largely lost in the Panic of 1893. In the aftermath, they moved to Minneapolis, Minnesota. At age seven years, Henrietta joined the First Baptist Church of Minneapolis.

Mears contracted muscular rheumatism at age 12, and lived with poor eyesight all her life. Although her doctors advised her not to attend university, fearing it would cause her to lose her sight entirely, Mears did attend the University of Minnesota, graduating in 1913.

== Career ==
In 1915, Mears returned to Minneapolis to teach at Central High School and live with her sister. In Minneapolis, she attended the First Baptist Church, where she was encouraged to apply educational standards to Sunday School programs.

In the 1920s, Stuart MacLennan, pastor of the First Presbyterian Church of Hollywood, spoke at the Mears' sisters' church in Minneapolis. In 1927, Mears took a sabbatical year to consider whether she should enter Christian work full-time. She and Margaret traveled to California, where the sisters visited MacLennan's church, which had a Sunday School of 450 students. Before Mears left, MacLennan offered her the Director of Christian Education post, and in 1928, she and Margaret moved to Hollywood.

Henrietta lectured and wrote passionately about Sunday school's power to teach others the Bible. Within two years, Sunday School attendance at Hollywood "Pres" was averaging more than 4,200 per week. She served in leading the Sunday School program from 400 to 6500. Henrietta Mears taught the college-age program herself. She continued to work at Hollywood Presbyterian Church as the Director of Christian Education until her death.

In 1937, Mears bought the Forest Home resort in Forest Falls, California, turning it into a center for Christian camps and retreats.

In 1946 and 1947, Mears visited post-war Europe. After witnessing the poor conditions, she organized a week-long collegiate conference at Forest Home to address the situation in fall 1947. The conference attracted around 600 attendees, including Bill Bright, Richard Halverson, and Louis Evans Jr.; Billy Graham, then not widely known, was invited to speak at the conference. He later cited his time at Forest Home as a turning point in his faith journey. The conference kicked off an annual series of conference, and the formation of the Hollywood Christian Group.

== Legacy ==
Mears was one of the most influential Christian leaders of the 20th century. She founded Gospel Light, a publishing company for many of her training materials, and Gospel Literature Internationals (GLINT). She profoundly impacted the ministries of Jim Rayburn (Young Life) and Billy Graham (Billy Graham Evangelistic Association), with her emphasis on Scripture and a clear Gospel message for young people. Mears is believed by many theologians to have most directly shaped Bill Bright's Four Spiritual Laws, which defined modern evangelism in the 20th century.

She was a gifted educator and was known as "Teacher" by those in her program. Her book, What the Bible is All About, has sold over three million copies.

Hundreds of men and women came out of her Sunday School program into full-time Christian service, including First Presbyterian Hollywood's Louis Evans, Sr.'s son; Louis H. Evans, Jr. (husband of the actress Colleen Townsend Evans), who became the organizing pastor of Bel Air Presbyterian church; Bill Bright and his wife Vonette Zachary Bright, founder of Campus Crusade for Christ, which lived in and worked out of Henrietta's house for 10 years; Billy Graham; Reverend L. David Cowie, pastor of University Presbyterian Church in Seattle, Washington, 1948 to 1961; Donn Moomaw, a UCLA All American football player in 1951, who later became Ronald Reagan's pastor at Bel Air Presbyterian Church, and Frederick Dale Bruner, a biblical scholar best known for his commentaries on Matthew and John.

== Personal life and death ==
Mears never married or had children. In her adult life, she lived with her sister, and, following her sister's death, with Bill and Vonette Bright. She never officially retired, and died in her sleep on March 20, 1963 at her home in Bel Air, California.

== Selected works ==
- What the Bible is All About, Regal Books, 1953 ISBN 978-0-8307-4329-2
- God's Plan, Regal Books, 2008 ISBN 978-0-8307-4562-3
- Teacher, Regal Books, 2006 ISBN 0-8307-3347-7
- Mears, Henrietta C. (2012). Christians on the Move: The Book of Acts: The Continuing Work of Jesus Christ Through the Apostles and the Early Church. Gospel Light.
- Mears, Henrietta C. (2013). Discover Jesus in the Pages of the Bible: Amazing Facts About the Greatest Person Who Ever Lived. Gospel Light.
- Mears, Henrietta C. (2011). Founders of Our Faith: Genesis through Deuteronomy: From Creation to the Promised Land. Gospel Light.
- Mears, Henrietta C. (2012). Sunday School Changes Everything: Your Church's Best Opportunity to Reach the Next Generation for Christ. Gospel Light.
- Mears, Henrietta C. (2011). The Life of Jesus: Matthew through John: His Life, Death, Resurrection and Ministry. Gospel Light.
- Mears, Henrietta C. (2011). What the Bible Is All About: Bible Handbook, KJV, rev. ed. Gospel Light.
