= We Still Hold These Truths =

Book by Matthew Spalding

- 1st ed. cover
- Author: Matthew Spalding
- Language: English
- Subject: Politics of the United States
- Publisher: Intercollegiate Studies Institute
- Publication date: October 15, 2009 (hardback)
- Publication place: United States
- Pages: 267
- ISBN: 978-1-935191-67-4

We Still Hold These Truths is the title of a 2004 non-fiction book by Ronald L. Hirsch› as well as a 2009 non-fiction political history book by Dr. Matthew Spalding. Hirsch has had a varied career as a lawyer, nonprofit executive, consultant, and author. His blog is www.PreservingAmericanValues.com. Spalding was Director of American Studies at The Heritage Foundation. He later became the Kirby Professor in Constitutional Government at Hillsdale College and the Dean of the Van Andel Graduate School of Government at Hillsdale College's Washington, D.C., campus. As Vice President for Washington Operations, he also oversees the Allan P. Kirby, Jr. Center for Constitutional Studies and Citizenship and the academic and educational programs of Hillsdale in the nation's capital.

In November 2009, the Spalding book reached number two on the Washington Post non-fiction bestseller list.

== Overview ==
Spalding's focus in the book is the United States' "first principles", his belief that those principles have been betrayed by the American Left, and his plan for how conservatives can work to restore the vision of the Founding Fathers. Spalding takes the reader through the earliest days of American history to the present, demonstrating these principles were understood by the Founders and shaped the U.S. national identity.

According to Spalding, the erosion of these principles began with the Progressives of the late 19th and early 20th centuries, who believed in centralization, bureaucracy, relativism and a lack of absolute truths, and who, Spalding writes, sought to undermine the vision of the U.S. Constitution's framers. Spalding calls today's liberals "pimps for the new progressivism," inspired by New Dealers and proponents of the Great Society. Spalding also writes that recent Republican electoral victories and the successes of the Tea Party demonstrate that Americans still believe in the vision outlined by the Founding Fathers, and that a debate over the Constitution has been given new life everywhere from law schools to the federal government.

The book's foreword is written by conservative commentator William Bennett, who writes that We Still Hold These Truths "makes a clear and compelling case for America's principles as an enduring source of real, practical guidance for today explaining how we got so far off track, and laying out how to get our nation back on course."

Hirsch's interpretation of our founding documents—the Declaration of Independence and the Constitution—are strikingly different. He finds them to be decidedly liberal. There is no question, as Hirsch notes in his book, that both the conservative and liberal ideologies that have run through American history lie in the interpretation of our founding documents. However, the words of the Declaration are revolutionary and decidedly liberal. The Constitution does not tone them down but rather implements the role of government as set forth in the Declaration—"to secure" the self-evident rights there set forth. And since the aspirations of the Founders included in the Declaration were in major ways not honored in our country's inception—slavery was incorporated into our fabric and women remained unequal—because of the exigencies of the time (the need to pull the 13 colonies together) and its mores, it remained for those aspirations to be realized as times and mores changed. Those Spalding reviles as having perverted the founder's ideals have in fact given them life.

Using the words of the Declaration of Independence as a touchstone, Hirsch defines an overarching vision to guide America's future and the corresponding policies on major issues facing America that will lift all Americans up.

== Reception ==
The book received positive reviews from conservative-leaning reviewers, including The Weekly Standard, National Review and The Washington Times, and reached No. 2 on the Washington Post's non-fiction bestseller list. According to columnist Cal Thomas, Spalding's book offers a "long-range strategy" for conservatives "if they want to save the country from the long-term consequences of what many call 'socialism.'"

Hirsch's book received a pre-publication endorsement from James Fallows, National Correspondent, The Atlantic, saying in part, "Ron Hirsch's We Still Hold These Truths is a systematic and serious effort to make [the presidential] debate as clear and valuable as it can be. Agree or disagree with his specific conclusions, the questions he is asking are the right ones for the public this year."
