= 8th Locarno Film Festival =

Film festival in Locarno, Switzerland

- Location: Locarno, Switzerland
- Founded: 1946
- Festival date: Opening: 1 July 1954; Closing: 11 July 1954
- Website: Locarno Film Festival

Locarno Film Festival
- 9th 7th

The 8th Locarno Film Festival was held from 1 July to 11 July 1954 in Locarno, Switzerland. The Locarno Film Festival remained an official International Federation of Film Producers Associations, FIAPF, festival, and as such it gave out no official awards.

This was in light of the International Federation of Film Producers Association announcing its goal of reducing the number of competitive festivals each year to one and including Locarno in the D category of "festivals of national character." At Locarno, additional agreements were reached between the producers association and cultural organizations with an interest in Children's films.

== Official Sections ==
The following films were screened in these sections:

=== Pre-Program ===
Pre-Program / Cinematographic News

Original Title	English Title	Director(s)	Production Country
Actualites Françaises N. 26	French News N. 26		France
Cine Journal Suisse N. 630, N. 631	Cine Journal Switzerland N. 630, N. 631		Switzerland
Fox Movietone N. 442, N. 443			USA
La Settimana Incom, N. 258, N. 259	The Week In, N. 258, N. 259		Italy
Neue Deutsche Wochenschau	New German Weekly Show		Germany
No Do Color N. 2			Spain
Noticiario No Do	No Do		Spain
Pathe Journal N. 26, N. 27			France

=== Programme Principal ===
Programme Principal

Original Title	English Title	Director(s)	Year	Production Country
Bad Boy		Kurt Neumann	1949	USA
Carnival Story		Kurt Neumann	1954	USA
Carosello Napoletano	Neapolitan Carousel	Ettore Gianini	1954	Italy
Das Licht Der Liebe	The Light of Love	R.A. Stemmle	1954	Austria
Die Geschichte Vom Kleinen Muck	The Story of Little Muck	Wolfgang Staudte	1953	Germany
Egy Kerecsen Solyom Törtenete		Istvan Homoki-Nagy	1951	Hungary
Eine Frau Von Heute	A Woman of Today	Paul Verhoeven	1954	Germany
Jigoku-Mon	Gate of Hell	Teinosuke Kinugasa	1953	Japan
Kein Hüsung		Arthur Pohl	1954	Germany
La Grande Speranza	Submarine Attack	Duilio Coletti	1954	Italy
Latuko		Edgar M. Queeny	1952	USA
Le Mouton À Cinq Pattes	The Sheep Has Five Legs	Henri Verneuil	1954	France
Les Etoiles Du Ballet Russe	The Stars of the Russian Ballet			Russia
Les Femmes S'En Balancent	The Women Couldn't Care Less	Bernard Borderie	1954	France
Les Fruits Sauvages	Wild Fruits	Hervé Bromberger	1954	France
Maddalena		Augusto Genina	1954	Italy
Mesic Nada Rekou	The Moon Over the River	Václav Krška	1953	Czech Republic
Mr. Drake's Duck		Val Guest	1951	Great Britain
Musoduro	In the Spring	Giuseppe Bennati	1953	Italy
Panique	Panic	Julien Duvivier	1946	France
Princ Bajaja	Prince Bayaya	Jiří Trnka		Czech Republic
Przygoda Na Mariensztacie	Adventure in Marienstadt	Leonard Buczkowski	1954	Poland
Rakoczi Hadnagya	Rakoczy's Lieutenant	Frigyes Ban	1954	Hungary
Rotation		Wolfgang Staudte	1949	Germany
So Big		Robert Wise	1953	USA

=== Short Films - Preview Program ===
Avant-Programme Courts métrages

Pre-Program Short Films
Original Title	English Title	Director(s)	Year	Production Country
Amour Et Chimeres				France
Die Kamera War Auch Dabei	The Camera Was There Too			Germany
Donald's Diary		Jack Kinney, Clyde Geronimi, Hamilton Luske, Bill Roberts	1954	USA
Donzère Mondragon		Pierre Jallaud, François Villiers	1953	France
Festival International Du Film De Locarno, 1946-1954				Switzerland
Going, Going, Gosh		Chuck Jones	1952	USA
Helpless Hippo		Connie Rasinski	1953	USA
Jala				India
Jerez Y Los Caballos	Jerez and the Horses			Spain
L'Homme Et La Bete	The Man and the Beast	Marc de Gastyne		France
L'Oeuvre De Wit Stowsz	The Work of Wit Stowsz			Poland
L'Île Du Bonheur	The Island of Happiness			Spain
La Vire-Cailloux		Evrard de Rouvre	1954	France
Land Of Enlightment				India
Le Chaton Desobeissant				Russia
Le Hibou Et Le Pivert				Poland
Le Mystere De La Licorne	The Mystery of the Unicorn	Jean-Claude See		France
Le Pommier Aux Pommes D'Or				Czech Republic
Le Verger De Pere Laurent	The Orchard of Pere Laurent			Poland
Les Cornemusiers Tcheques				Czech Republic
Les Maìtres Du Sport	The Master of Sport			Russia
Log Rollers		Mannie Davis	1953	USA
Lone Chipmuck		Jack Kinney, Jack Hannah	1954	USA
Madrid Pittoresque	Picturesque Madrid			Spain
Music Of India				India
Prescription For Percy		Mannie Davis	1954	USA
Rugge Bear		Jack Hannah	1953	USA
The Romance Of Transportation		Colin Low	1952	Canada
Troubadour De La Joie		M. Omer Boucquey	1951	France
Una Goccia D'Acqua	A Drop of Water			Italy
Uno Svizzero In Italia	A Swiss in Italy			Italy
Water Every Hare		Chuck Jones	1952	USA
Workiing For Pin Up				USA

=== Out of Program ===
Original Title	English Title	Director(s)	Year	Production Country
Las Aguas Bajan Turbias	Dark River	Hugo del Carril	1952	Argentina

=== Special Sections ===
Special Sections / Aspects of Italian Neorealist Cinema
Original Title	English Title	Director(s)	Year	Production Country
Ambienti E Personaggi	Environments and Characters	Vittorio De Sica		Italy
Ave Marie		Fernando Cerchio	1947	Italy
Barboni		Dino Risi Risi	1946	Italy
Canzoni Tra Due Guerre	Songs Between Two Wars	Antonio Marchi	1951	Italy
Colpa Del Sole		Alberto Moravia	1951	Italy
Fidanzate Di Carta	Paper Girlfriends	Renzo Renzi	1952	Italy
I Bambini Ci Guardano	The Children are Watching Us	Vittorio De Sica	1944	Italy
Isole Della Laguna		Luciano Emmer, Enrico Gras	1948	Italy
L'Ospedale Del Delitto		Luigi Comencini	1951	Italy
La Terra Trema	The Earth Trembles	Luchino Visconti	1948	Italy
Lungo Brenta		Cesare Ardolino, Gianluigi Polidori	1951	Italy
Ossessione	Obsession	Luchino Visconti	1942	Italy
Paisan	Countryman	Roberto Rossellini	1946	Italy
Quando Il Po' È Dolce		Renzo Renzi	1953	Italy
Roma, Città Aperta	Rome, Open City	Roberto Rossellini	1945	Italy
Sciuscià	Shoeshine	Vittorio De Sica	1946	Italy

== Awards ==
=== Jury of the Swiss Association of Film Journalists ===
- Prize of the Jury of the Swiss Association of Film Journalists: LES FRUITS SAUVAGES by Hervé Bromberger,PRINC BAJAJA by Jiri Trnka,JIGOKU-MON by Teinosuke Kinugasa
- Homage to: Norman McLaren

=== International Critic's Jury ===
- Prize of the International Critic's Jury: ROTATION by Wolfgang Staudte,JIGOKU-MON by Teinosuke Kinugasa,LE MOUTON À CINQ PATTES by Henri Verneuil
