= Fourth Presbyterian Church (Bethesda, Maryland) =

Evangelical Presbyterian church in Bethesda, Maryland

- The sanctuary of Fourth Presbyterian Church from River Road
- Fourth Presbyterian Church
- 38°58′08″N 77°06′40″W
- Address: 5500 River Road, Bethesda, Maryland
- Country: United States
- Denomination: Evangelical Presbyterian Church (United States)
- Website: 4thpres.org

History
- Founded: November 24, 1828

Architecture
- Style: Colonial revival
- Completed: 1958

Specifications
- Materials: Brick

Clergy
- Pastor: Todd Smedley

Fourth Presbyterian Church is a Presbyterian congregation and church complex in Bethesda, Maryland, in the suburbs of Washington, D.C., United States. Founded in 1828 in Washington, D.C., Fourth became a large and prominent congregation with several nationally famous ministers and members and planted numerous additional Presbyterian churches in Washington and surrounding areas. It was located in downtown Washington until 1899, when it relocated to the Columbia Heights neighborhood. From its Columbia Heights building, it broadcast sermons over the radio. Declining membership led Fourth to relocate to the Maryland suburbs in 1958. During the 20th century, it became known as a prominent evangelical congregation within the mainline Presbyterian Church, and in 1986 it departed for the Evangelical Presbyterian Church denomination. Fourth's ministries included a private elementary and middle school near its Bethesda campus.

== History ==
Fourth was organized on November 24, 1828. It was formed by members of the Second Presbyterian Church (which later merged into what become New York Avenue Presbyterian Church) who separated from Second over disagreement about the appointment of a new minister. It was received into the local presbytery in 1829 with Joshua Danforth as its first pastor. Fourth's first building was erected in 1829 on the southeast corner of Ninth Street and Grant Place NW. (Note: This location was later the site of the Martin Luther King Jr. Memorial Library.) When American Presbyterianism divided in 1837, Fourth joined the "New School" movement that emphasized personal religious conversion and evangelism.

In 1839, Fourth began a Sunday school for African American children, and it supported the formation of the First Colored Presbyterian Church (later known as Fifteenth Street Presbyterian Church) in 1842. A second building across the street was completed under the pastorate of John Cross Smith in 1841; the dedication service was attended by President John Tyler and his cabinet. The First Colored Presbyterian Church moved into Fourth's former building in 1850. During Cross's pastorate, Fourth became known as a "mother of churches" for starting six additional congregations in addition to the First Colored church. During the Civil War, the church leaders for several months tendered its building to civil authorities for use as a military hospital.

Joseph T. Kelly, who had grown up at Fourth, became its fourth minister in 1878. During his 47-year tenure, the church moved in 1899 to a new building in Columbia Heights at 13th and Fairmont Streets NW. Its first building on this site was a Gothic Revival chapel designed by Frederic B. Pyle. The former church at 9th and G Place was scheduled for demolition and the property sold. During this period, Fourth planted daughter churches in Washington and in Berwyn, Maryland, and established a Young People's Prayer Meeting Association.

Under its next pastor, James H. Miers, Fourth completed a larger building on its Columbia Heights site in 1928. This building was in the Italian Renaissance revival style and was designed by Appleton Clark Jr. Miers began local radio broadcasts of Fourth's services in 1929. However, attendance declined at the urban location by the middle of the 20th century. Miers presided over Fourth's move to the suburbs, when it dedicated a new facility in March 1957 on River Road in Bethesda. The Columbia Heights building was sold to the Greater First Baptist Church of Mount Pleasant Plains.

Miers died shortly thereafter was succeeded by Richard C. Halverson, who remained at Fourth until 1981 when he became chaplain of the United States Senate. Under the pastorate of Halverson, who had come from the evangelical First Presbyterian Church of Hollywood, the church became a prominent evangelical congregation. It formally protested the landmark U.S. Supreme Court decision Abington School District v. Schempp, which declared school-sponsored Bible reading and public prayer unconstitutional. The congregation also protested the adoption of the Confession of 1967 by the United Presbyterian Church in the United States of America on the grounds of the confession's liberal theology. The Fourth congregation tripled in size under Halverson.

Fourth's attendance fell in the early 1980s during an extended interregnum marked by increasing tension between Fourth and the Presbyterian Church. The congregation called Welsh-born minister Robert Norris as its seventh senior pastor in 1984, and in 1986 he led Fourth out of the Presbyterian Church (USA) and into the newly formed Evangelical Presbyterian Church. Fourth cited three main reasons for disaffiliating with the PC(USA): disagreements over biblical inerrancy, efforts by the denomination to exercise greater control, and disagreements over social issues such as abortion and homosexuality. Under Norris, membership rebounded, with newcomers often drawn from theological and political conservatives. The Bethesda building was expanded in 1994 and 2005. Fourth hosted Reformed Theological Seminary's first campus in the Washington area. He was succeeded as senior pastor by Todd Smedley in 2015. As of 2017, Fourth had approximately 2,700 members.

== Architecture ==
The former Fourth Presbyterian Church (1928) in Columbia Heights

Fourth's Columbia Heights building was designed by Appleton Clark in the Italian Renaissance Revival style instead of the planned Gothic Revival sanctuary designed by Pyle. The building is faced with buff Aquia Creek sandstone. The interior was also finished in an Italian Renaissance style and featured a three-manual Kilgen organ.

The original chapel building had a gymnasium addition built in 1903, making it one of only two churches in Washington to feature a gymnasium when it opened. Portions of the Gothic chapel and gymnasium were not resurfaced in the 1928 expansion and continued to feature Gothic Revival elements.

== School ==
Fourth opened a reformed and Christian elementary school in 1999 called Fourth Presbyterian School. By 2012, it had expanded to encompass preschool through eighth grade on a 32-acre (13 ha) campus in Potomac, Maryland. The school was approved for an expansion to high school grades that would have brought its enrollment to 400 students, but it closed in 2014.

== Notable members ==
Fourth Presbyterian Church has had numerous prominent members and regular attenders during its history. Regular attenders have included geneticist Francis Collins, Senator Mark Hatfield, U.S. Ambassador to the United Nations Jeane Kirkpatrick, Senator Thomas S. Kleppe, journalist Doyle McManus, Vice President Dan Quayle, syndicated columnist George Will and pro-life activist Charmaine Yoest. Fourth members have included Housing and Urban Development Secretary Jack Kemp, columnist Mike McManus and syndicated columnist Cal Thomas. Notable clergy at Fourth include Richard C. Halverson, who later served as chaplain of the United States Senate, and Frank Young, who became a pastor at Fourth after serving as commissioner of the Food and Drug Administration.
