= Michael Wenning =

American Presbyterian minister (1935–2011)

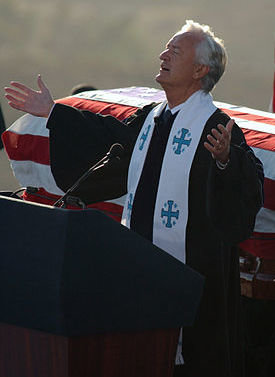
- Wenning delivering the invocation at the funeral of former president Ronald Reagan, June 2004

Senior pastor of the Bel Air Presbyterian Church
- In office 1995–2001

Personal details
- Born: Michael Heeley Wenning; July 5, 1935 Cape Town, South Africa
- Died: June 28, 2011 (aged 75) Mission Viejo, California, U.S.
- Spouse(s): Freda Wenning (1957-2011; his death)

Dr. Michael Heeley Wenning (July 5, 1935 – June 28, 2011) was a South African-born American Presbyterian minister. He served as the senior pastor at the Bel Air Presbyterian Church from 1995 to 2001. He gained national prominence when conducting President Ronald Reagan's state funeral.

== Early life ==
Wenning was born in Cape Town. He was educated at Texas Christian University (Master of Divinity) in Fort Worth, Texas, and New York University (master's in both psychology and counseling).

== Career ==
From 1969 to 1977, he was pastor of a Presbyterian church in Durban, South Africa. In 1977 he returned to the United States where he worked for the next three decades as a pastor in various Presbyterian Church (U.S.A.) congregations. He served as the senior pastor at the Pleasant Hills Community Presbyterian Church in Pleasant Hills, Pennsylvania from January 1977 to August 1986, and at Geneva Presbyterian Church in Laguna Woods, California from September 1986 to July 1995.

=== Reagan funeral ===
He was notably the senior pastor at Bel Air Presbyterian Church from 1995 to 2001. There he developed a close relationship with church members Ronald and Nancy Reagan. He notably conducted President Reagan's interment service on June 7, 2004, following the latter's death and state funeral.

== Death ==
Wenning died in 2011, at age 75, at his home in Mission Viejo, California, from kidney failure resulting from leukemia. He is survived by his wife Freda and his two daughters.
