= Lloyd John Ogilvie =

American chaplain (1930–2019)

61st Chaplain of the United States Senate
- In office 11 March 1995 – 15 March 2003
- President: Bill Clinton; George W. Bush
- Preceded by: Richard C. Halverson
- Succeeded by: Barry Clayton Black

Personal details
- Born: 2 September 1930 Kenosha, WI, US
- Died: 5 June 2019 (aged 88)
- Spouses: Mary Jane Jenkins (m. 1951) (d. April 2003) Doris Kaiser Sumner (m. 2005)
- Children: 3
- Education: Lake Forest College BA 1952; Garrett Theological Seminary ThM Theology 1957; University of Edinburgh
- Occupation: Christian minister

Lloyd John Ogilvie (2 September 1930 – 5 June 2019) was a Presbyterian minister who served as the 61st Chaplain of the United States Senate from the 104th through 108th Congresses (1995–2003).

== Early years ==
Lloyd John Ogilvie was born in Kenosha Wisconsin on 2 September 1930. He was educated in the public schools of Kenosha. He then attended and graduated from Lake Forest College (B.A.) in 1952, and from Garrett Theological Seminary (Th.M.) in 1957. He conducted postgraduate studies at the New College of the University of Edinburgh in Scotland.

== Ministry career ==
- Student Pastor, Gurnee Community Church, Gurnee, Illinois (1952–1956)
- Pastor, Winnetka Presbyterian Church, Winnetka, Illinois (1956–1962)
- Pastor, First Presbyterian Church, Bethlehem, Pennsylvania (1962–1972)
- Pastor, First Presbyterian Church of Hollywood, Los Angeles, California (1972–1995)
- Chaplain, United States Senate, Washington, D.C. (1995–2003)
- President, Leadership Unlimited (2003–2019)

== Media ministry ==
Lloyd Ogilvie's former nationally syndicated radio and television ministry was called "Let God Love You." This weekly television ministry ran for seventeen years and the daily radio ministry spanned ten years. "Let God Love You" was recorded at and broadcast from First Presbyterian Church of Hollywood, in Los Angeles, California. This media ministry was guided by the strong national Board of Directors of the Lloyd Ogilvie Ministries, an independent, non-profit organization. In 1982, the Directors adopted "Ten Commitments" for the development of the ministry and its financial accountability. Dr. Ogilvie brought to this media ministry the same commitment to listening he expressed as pastor of his church. His messages on the "Let God Love You" programs were his part of an ongoing dialogue with his listeners and viewers. On every program he encouraged them to write him about what was on their minds and hearts. His voluminous correspondence with people and a special yearly inventory of their deepest concerns provided the focus of this personal sharing of grace. The central purpose was to help people turn life's struggles into stepping stones by linking their problems to the promises and power of God. Beginning sixteen years ago with one television station in Los Angeles, the "Let God Love You" program expanded throughout the nation on independent stations and cable networks. The media ministry was supported exclusively by viewer and listener contributions and all gifts were used only for costs of producing and airing the programs. Dr. Ogilvie received no salary from the media ministry.

== Senate chaplaincy ==
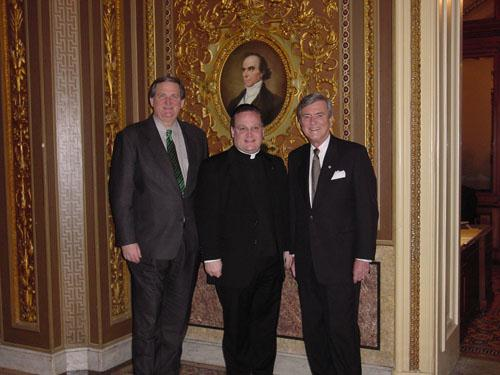
Ogilvie with Senator Bob Smith and Reverend Edward J. Arsenault in April 2001

On 24 January 1995 Dr. Ogilvie was elected the 61st Chaplain of the United States Senate. He began his responsibilities on 11 March 1995. In addition to opening the Senate each day in prayer, his duties as full-time Chaplain included counseling and spiritual care for the Senators, their families and their staffs, a combined constituency of six thousand people. Dr. Ogilvie's days were filled with meetings with Senators about spiritual and moral issues, assisting Senators' staffs with research on theological and biblical questions, speaking to five Senate Bible Study and Prayer groups, encouraging such groups at the weekly Senate Prayer Breakfast, and sharing in small discussion and reflection groups among the Senators. He defined the Chaplaincy as non-political, non-partisan and non-sectarian. In Dr. Ogilvie's words, "I saw my role as Chaplain to be an intercessor for the members of the Senate family, a trusted prayer partner, and a faithful counselor to them as they sought to know and do God's will in the monumental responsibilities entrusted to them."

== Death ==
His death at the age of 88 was announced by Fuller Seminary with which he established the Lloyd John Ogilvie Institute of Preaching in 2006.

== Awards and degrees ==
=== Partial List of Awards ===
- Distinguished Service Citation, Lake Forest College
- Preacher of the Year, Religion in Media
- Angel Award for Religion in Media
- Silver Angel Award for Television Ministry (1982, 1986)
- Gold Medallion Book Award for "Making Stress Work For You" (1985)
- William Booth Award, The Salvation Army (1992)
- One of 12 Individuals Named in Worldwide Survey, "Twelve Most Effective Preachers in the English-Speaking World," Baylor University (1996)

=== Honorary degrees ===
- Doctor of Divinity, Whitworth University (1973)
- Doctor of Humane Letters, University of Redlands (1974)
- Doctor of Humanities, Moravian College (1975)
- Doctor of Laws, Eastern University (1988)
- Doctor of Humane Letters, Seattle Pacific University (1995)
- Doctor of Divinity, Westmont College (1997)
- Doctor of Divinity, Lake Forest College (1997)
- Doctor of Laws, George Fox University (1997)
- Doctor of Humanities, Dickinson College (1998)
- Doctor of Laws, Pepperdine University (1998)
- Doctor of Divinity, Lehigh University (1999)
- Doctor of Sacred Theology, Roberts Wesleyan College (2000)
- Doctor of Laws, Belhaven University (2001)
- Doctor of Divinity, Azusa Pacific University (2001)
- Doctor of Divinity, University of Edinburgh (2003)
- Doctor of Divinity, Carthage College (2004)
- Doctor of Divinity, Asbury College (2008)
- Doctor of Letters, King's College (2008)

== Books ==
Chronological List:

1. A Life Full of Surprises – 1968 Abingdon Press
2. Let God Love You (Philippians) – 1974 Word Books
3. If I Should Wake Before I Die – 1974 Regal Books
4. Lord of the Ups and Downs – 1974 Regal Books
5. Life Without Limits (Mark) – 1975 Word Books
6. You've Got Charisma – 1975 Abingdon Press
7. Drumbeat of Love (Acts) – 1976 Word Books
8. The Cup of Wonder (Communion Messages) – 1976 Tyndale Books
9. You Are Loved and Forgiven (Colossians) – 1977 Regal Books
10. When God First Thought of You – 1978 Word Books
11. The Autobiography of God (On the Parables) – 1979 Regal Books
12. The Beauty of Caring – 1980 Harvest Books
13. The Beauty of Friendship – 1980 Harvest Books
14. The Beauty of Love – 1980 Harvest Books
15. The Beauty of Sharing – 1980 Harvest Books
16. The Bush is Still Burning (The "I Am" Sayings of Jesus) – 1980 Word Books
17. Congratulations-God Believes in You (Beatitudes) – 1980 Word Books
18. Magnificent Vision (formerly "Radiance of the Inner Splendor") – 1980 Vine Books
19. You Can Live As It Was Meant To Be (I & II Thes.) – 1980 Regal Books
20. Ask Him Anything (Answers to Life's Deepest Questions) – 1980 Word Books
21. God's Best for My Life (Daily Devotional) – 1981 Harvest Books
22. Discovering God's Will in Your Life – 1982 Harvest House
23. You Can Pray With Power – 1983 Regal Books
24. Longing To Be Free – 1984 Harvest Books
25. Lord of the Impossible (Prophets) – 1984 Abingdon Press
26. Falling Into Greatness (Psalms) – 1984 Thomas Nelson
27. Making Stress Work For You – 1984 Word Books
28. If God Cares, Why Do I Still Have Problems? – 1985 Word Books
29. Jesus The Healer (The Healing Ministry) – 1985 Revell Co.
30. The Other Jesus – 1986 Word Books
31. Understanding the Hard Sayings of Jesus – 1988 Word Books
32. Living Without Fear (12 Steps) – 1987 Word Books
33. A Future and a Hope – 1988 Word Books
34. God's Transforming Love (Daily Devotional) – 1988 Regal Books
35. Your Will, God's Will – 1988 Harvest House
36. Enjoying God (Ephesians) – 1989 Word Books
37. Silent Strength (Daily Devotional) – 1990 Harvest House
38. Lord of the Loose Ends ("He is Able" claims of the Epistles) – 1991 Word Books
39. Conversation With God (Prayer) – 1992 Harvest House
40. Climbing the Rainbow (Claiming the Covenant Promise) – 1993 Word Books
41. Turn Your Struggles Into Stepping Stones (Daily Devotional) – 1993 Word Books
42. The Greatest Counselor in the World (Holy Spirit) – 1994 Servant Publ.
43. The Heart of God – 1994 Regal Books
44. Asking God Your Hardest Questions Harold Shaw (formerly Ask Him Anything) – 1996
45. One Quiet Moment – 1997 Harvest House
46. Acts of the Holy Spirit – 1999 Shaw Publishers
47. Facing the Future Without Fear – 1999 Servant Publ.
48. Quiet Moments With God – 2000 Harvest House
49. Perfect Peace – 2001 Harvest House
50. Intimate Prayer (formerly Conversation with God) – 2002 Harvest House
51. When You Need A Miracle – 2004 Harvest House
52. Praying Through The Tough Times – 2005 Harvest House
53. The Red Ember In The White Ash – 2006 Harvest House

General Editor of: Thirty-three volume Communicators Commentary Series of the Bible (Word Books)

Author of Communicators Commentary volumes:

- Books of Hosea, Joel, Amos, Obadiah, Jonah/Vol. 20 (Word Books)
- Book of Acts/Vol. 5 (Word Books)

== Personal life ==
He was married to Mary Jane Jenkins on 25 March 1951, and was widowed in April 2003. He later married Doris Kaiser Sumner on 9 April 2005. Ogilvie had three children: Heather, Scott, and Andrew Ogilvie. He also had four grandchildren: Erin, Airley, Bonnie, and Scotter Ogilvie.

Religious titles
Preceded by Richard C. Halverson	61st US Senate Chaplain; 11 March 1995 – 15 March 2003	Succeeded by Barry Black
