= Louis Evans Jr. =

American Presbyterian church leader (1926-2008)

Louis Hadley Evans Jr. (June 20, 1926 – October 29, 2008) was an American Presbyterian church leader.

== Biography ==
Evans was born in Wilmington, California, and was one of four children of Marie Egly and the Rev. Louis Hadley Evans Sr., pastor of First Presbyterian Church of Hollywood. Louis graduated from Hollywood High School where he was associated student body (ASB) president, before serving in the Navy during WWII.

In 1947, he married Colleen Townsend, a Hollywood actress.

Evans led the first World Deputation team to go out from Hollywood Presbyterian in June 1950. The early teams had the goal of taking the "message of Christ's redeeming love to the war-weary students of Europe." However, they were challenged by Corrie ten Boom: "The people of Europe do need to see the love and forgiveness of Christ. But the gospel team idea won't work. You have not suffered as the people in Europe have suffered, so what right have you to speak? If you want to make a vital witness to the power of your faith, go to a city destroyed by American bombs. Identify with the people. Work with them. Eat what they eat. Sleep where they sleep. Maybe if you do it well enough and long enough, without compensation, they will hear what you have to say." The team was sponsored by the World Council of Churches with the task of rebuilding foundations of destroyed buildings in Germany and France. By the 1960s, the group was focused on East Germany and known as the Berlin Fellowship.

Evans and his family moved to Washington to minister at the National Presbyterian Church, where most American presidents have attended services; visitors have included Queen Elizabeth and Mother Teresa. Ronald Reagan and his wife, Nancy Reagan, attended Evans' original Bel Air Church in California, as well as the National Presbyterian Church during his time as president.

Evans was the organizing pastor of Bel Air Church in Bel Air, California, where the first church gatherings were at the manse (pastor's home) in April 1956. In 1963, Evans moved to San Diego to become pastor of La Jolla Presbyterian Church.

Evans' ministry was influenced by Henrietta Mears, who was the Christian Education Director of First Presbyterian Hollywood, where his father was pastor. Mears led several of Evans' friends to evangelism and ministry including Bill Bright and Richard Halverson.

His wife and a few other Hollywood starlets started the Hollywood Christian Group in 1949 in Mears's home. Original Hollywood Christian Group participants included Roy Rogers, Dale Evans, Billy Graham, Colleen Townsend Evans, Jane Russell, Stuart Hamblen, Ronald Reagan, and many others, in the living room of Henrietta Mears' home. The group was chaplained by J. Edwin Orr from 1949 to 1951. This group is where Billy Graham met radio personality Stuart Hamblen and other members of the Hollywood Christian Group including the Evanses, who visited Graham on location at the Los Angeles crusade. Up until this point, Graham was doing regional crusades successfully, but his numbers were not reaching the masses until Hamblen reported about Graham's crusades. Graham's crusades then began to explode in numbers and became national news.

In 1977, he helped found Washington Aviation Ministry, now known as Mercy Medical Airlift.

Evans died of amyotrophic lateral sclerosis (Lou Gehrig's disease) at his home in Fresno, California, in 2008.
