= 5th Locarno Film Festival =

Film festival in Locarno, Switzerland

- Location: Locarno, Switzerland
- Founded: 1946
- Festival date: Opening: 29 June 1950; Closing: 9 July 1950
- Website: Locarno Film Festival

Locarno Film Festival
- 6th 4th

The 5th Locarno Film Festival was held from 29 June to 9 July 1950 in Locarno, Switzerland. The festival returned to its no official prizes standard this year; however, the attending international critics decided to vote anyways and declared When Willie Comes Marching Home by John Ford the best picture of the festival.

== Screenings ==
The following films were screened in the sections:

=== Pre-Program (Avant-Programme) ===
Pre-Program
Title	Director(s)	Year	Production Country
A Day With Brumas			
Actualite Cines			
Back Alley Oproar	Fritz Freleng	1948	USA
Ginger Nutt's Forest Dragon	Bert Felsead	1950	United Kingdom
La Vie Secrete Des Visages	Albert Guyot	1945	France
Caffe Garibaldi			
Luxembourg			
Il Museo Dei Sogni	Luigi Comencini	1950	Italy
Paint Pot Symphony	Connie Rasinski	1949	USA
Pattern Of Progress	John Krish	1948	United Kingdom
Rippling Romance	Bob Wickersham	1945	USA
Musique En Boîte (March Of Time)			
Processione Abruzzese			
Scendono A Natale			
Settimana Incom	Italian News Reel		

=== Main Program ===
Main Program (Programme Principal)
English Title	Original Title	Director(s)	Year	Production Country
Welcome, Reverend!	Benvenuto Reverendo	Aldo Fabrizi	1950	Italy
Hearts at Sea	Cuori Sul Mare	Giorgio Bianchi	1950	Italy
Abundance of Life	Des Lebens Überfluss	Wolfgang Liebeneiner	1950	Germany
The Lie	Die Lüge	Gustav Fröhlich	1950	Germany
Sunday in August	Domenica D'Agosto	Luciano Emmer	1950	Italy
Golden Salamander		Ronald Neame	1950	Great Britain
	Il Mulatto	Francesco De Robertis	1950	Italy
The Force of Destiny	La Forza Del Destino	Carmine Gallone	1949	Italy
Not Wanted		Elmer Clifton, Ida Lupino	1949	USA
Only One Night	Nur Eine Nacht	Fritz Kirchhoff	1950	Germany
Incorrigible	Rötägg	Arne Mattson	1946	Sudan
Stage Fright		Alfred Hitchcock	1950	USA
The Astonished Heart		Antony Darnborough, Terence Fisher	1949	Great Britain
They Were Not Divided		Terence Young	1950	Great Britain
Three Came Home		Jean Negulesco	1950	USA
Twenty Years	Vent'Anni	Giorgio Bianchi	1949	Italy
We Were Strangers		John Huston	1949	USA
When Willie Comes Marching Home		John Ford	1950	USA

=== Retrospective ===
Retrospective Film Review
English Title	Original Title	Director(s)	Year	Production Country
	A Nous La Liberte	René Clair	1931	France
	Il Museo Dei Sogni	Luigi Comencini		Italy
The Italian Straw Hat	Le Chapeau De Paille D'Italie	René Clair	1928	France
	Nascita Di Charlot	Gianni Comencini, Luigi Rognoni		Italy
Road to Life	Putevka V Zizn	Nikolaï Ekk	1931	Russia
	Vent'Anni D'Arte Muta	Emilio Scarpa		Italy

=== Complementary Program ===
Original Title	English Title	Director(s)	Year	Production Country
Dankalia		E.A. Wittlin		Switzerland
La Grande Voliere		Georges Péclet	1948	France
La Soif Des Hommes	Thirst of Men	Serge de Poligny	1949	France
Oinggongs Mishi		Zhu Shilin	1948	Hong Kong

=== Special Sections ===
Documentary Film Review (Special Program Under the Patronage of UNESCO)
English Title	Original Title	Director(s)	Year	Production Country
	Droits De L'Enfant, Droits De L'Homme	Jean Brenek		Canada, France
	L'Onu A L'Oeuvre	E. Genkalski		Poland
	L'Or Des Forèts	Theodor Christensen		Sudan
Picture In Your Mind		Philip Stapp		USA
	Savoir C'Est Pouvoir	Carlos Jimenez		Mexico
Program Dedicated To Israel, India And Africa
	Art Indigene			Belgium
Daybreak In Udi		John Taylor	1949	Great Britain
	Ladakh Diary			
Melody Of Hindustany Glimpses Of Ghandhiji		Parulka		India
	Omer Festival			Israel
Program Dedicated To Retrospective Documentary Film
Berlin: Symphony of Metropolis	Berlin, Die Symphonie Einer Grossstadt	Walter Ruttmann	1927	Germany
Nanook Of The North		Robert Flaherty	1922	USA
Ninety Degrees South		Herbert G. Ponting	1912	Great Britain
	Pini Di Roma	Mario Costa	1944	Italy
	Turksib	Victor Tourine	1929	Russia

== Awards ==
=== International Journalist Jury ===
- Premio della giuria internazionale dei giornalisti: When Willie Comes Marching Home by John Ford
- Mention assigned to: Golden Salamander by Ronald Neame, Dankalia by E. A. Wittlin, Domenica d'agosto by Luciano Emmer, Stage Fright by Alfred Hitchcock
