= When Willie Comes Marching Home =

1950 film by John Ford

- 1950 Theatrical Poster
- Directed by: John Ford
- Screenplay by: Richard Sale; Mary Loos
- Story by: Sy Gomberg
- Produced by: Fred Kohlmar
- Starring: Dan Dailey; Corinne Calvet; Colleen Townsend; William Demarest
- Cinematography: Leo Tover
- Edited by: James B. Clark
- Music by: Alfred Newman
- Production company: Twentieth Century-Fox
- Distributed by: Twentieth Century-Fox
- Release date: February 17, 1950 (New York)
- Running time: 82 minutes
- Country: United States
- Language: en
- Box office: $1,750,000

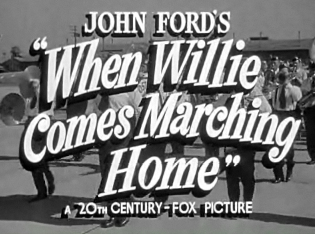
Title card

When Willie Comes Marching Home is a 1950 World War II comedy film directed by John Ford and starring Dan Dailey and Corinne Calvet. It is based on the 1945 short story "When Leo Comes Marching Home" by Sy Gomberg, who received a nomination for Best Motion Picture Story at the 23rd Academy Awards in 1951. The film won the Golden Leopard at the Locarno International Film Festival.

== Plot ==
William "Bill" Kluggs is the first in his hometown of Punxatawney, West Virginia, to enlist in the Army Air Forces after the attack on Pearl Harbor, making his father Herman, mother Gertrude, girlfriend Marge Fettles and the entire town proud. Willie tries to become a pilot but fails, although he is so proficient at aerial gunnery that, rather than being sent to Europe to fight, he becomes an instructor and is assigned to a base near his hometown. After two years in the same place, he is branded a coward by the townsfolk, even though he continually requests a transfer to combat duty.

Bill's chance arrives when he is permitted to replace a gunner on a B-17 Flying Fortress bomber. However, when his plane encounters trouble and the crew is ordered to bail, Bill is asleep and does not parachute from the plane until it is over German-occupied France. He is captured immediately by the local French Resistance unit led by Yvonne. He witnesses a secret German rocket launch that is filmed by the Resistance, and he is transported by a British torpedo boat to England with the film. Bill shares the vital information and his eyewitness confirmation with a series of important generals, first in London and then in Washington, D.C.

Bill, continuously sleep-deprived and suffering from motion sickness, is exhausted and collapses. He is sent to a military hospital to recuperate, under strict orders to not reveal any information. A doctor mistakenly places him in the psychopathic ward, but Bill escapes and heads home on a freight train.

Despite his strict orders, Bill tells his father and girlfriend what he has accomplished, but as only four days have elapsed since he left Punxatawney, they do not believe his story. Then officers arrive to return him to Washington to be decorated by the President of the United States, making his parents and girlfriend proud.

== Cast ==
- Dan Dailey as William "Bill" Kluggs
- Corinne Calvet as Yvonne
- Colleen Townsend as Marge Fettles
- William Demarest as Herman Kluggs
- Jimmy Lydon as Charles "Charlie" Fettles
- Lloyd Corrigan as Major Adams
- Evelyn Varden as Mrs. Gertrude Kluggs

== Production ==
Hollywood precision pilot Paul Mantz performed the crash stunt in which a PT-13D Stearman military training aircraft loses its wings crashing between two oak trees. The film was shot at 20th Century Fox Studios in Century City, California, Conejo Valley in Thousand Oaks, California and on Santa Catalina Island.

== Reception ==
In a contemporary review for The New York Times, critic Bosley Crowther called the film "one of the winter's most bright delights and joys" and wrote:

Don't expect messages, however. This tale of a soldier's sudden shove out of boredom into military turmoil is a comedy of errors and no more. It is no "Hail the Conquering Hero," in an ironic, Preston Sturges vein. The military mind, red-tape and medals are just devices with which it generates farce. But inside the boundaries of high slapstick it covers a lot of funny ground and creates a lot of genial feeling towards one harassed, good-natured Joe.
