= 6th Locarno Film Festival =

Film festival in Locarno, Switzerland

- Location: Locarno, Switzerland
- Founded: 1946
- Festival date: Opening: 2 July 1952; Closing: 14 July 1952
- Website: Locarno Film Festival

Locarno Film Festival
- 7th 5th

The 6th Locarno Film Festival was held from 2 July to 14 July 1952 in Locarno, Switzerland. It was originally planned to end one day earlier, but was extended to show the film The City Stands Trial (Processo alla città).

This year's event was notable for its political controversies. Many festival goers were angry when the festival refused to bar former Nazi and SS member, Ludwig Carl Moyzisch, from the festival. Moyzisch was invited by 20th Century Fox to the film premiere of Five Fingers, the adaptation of his book. After the screening, Moyzisch was apparently angry with his depiction in the film saying "20th Century Fox has fooled me" and that he would withdraw the option for his next book.

Another festival controversy came from the German Association of Film Journalists who objected to the depiction of WWI German colonial soldiers as "incendiaries and executioners" in John Huston's The African Queen saying it promoted anti-German sentiment.

As in years past, no official awards were given, but the international critics voted and gave their own awards.

== Official Sections ==
The following films were screened in these sections

=== Programme Principal ===
Programme Principal
English Title	Original Title	Director(s)	Year	Production Country
Anna		Alberto Lattuada	1951	Italy
Avec Andre Gide		Marc Allégret	1952	France
Hello Elephant	Buongiorno, Elefante (Sabu, Principe Ladro)	Vittorio De Sica, Gianni Franciolini	1952	Italy
Golden Marie	Casque d'Or	Jacques Becker	1952	France
Cave Temples Of India		Jagat Murari		India
Dans L'Arene Du Cirque		Léonide Varlamov		Russia
Diplomatic Courier		Henry Hathaway	1952	USA
The Little World of Don Camillo	Don Camillo / Le Petit Monde De Don Camillo	Julien Duvivier	1952	Italy, France
Filomena Marturano		Eduardo De Filippo	1950	Italy
5 Fingers		Joseph L. Mankiewicz	1952	USA
Divorced	Franskild	Gustav Molander	1951	Sudan
Hunted		Charles Crichton	1952	Great Britain
Infernal Love	Höllische Liebe	Géza von Cziffra	1949	Austria
Out of Evil	Klala Lebracha	Joseph Krumgold	1950	Israel
Village Feud	La Table Aux Creves	Henri Verneuil	1951	France
	Mahabali Puram	Jagat Murari		India
Nights on the Road	Nachts Auf Den Strassen	Rudolf Jugert	1952	Germany
Pickup		Hugo Haas	1951	USA
The City Stands Trial	Processo Alla Città	Luigi Zampa	1952	Italy
Rome 11:00	Roma, Ore 11	Giuseppe De Santis	1952	Italy
The African Queen		John Huston	1951	Great Britain
The Bullfighter And The Lady		Budd Boetticher	1951	USA
The Card		Ronald Neame	1952	Great Britain
Three Forbidden Stories	Tre Storie Proibite	Augusto Genina	1951	Italy
With A Song In My Heart		Walter Lang	1952	USA

=== Special Sections ===
Special Sections / Film Congress For Youth
English Title	Original Title	Director(s)	Year	Production Country
	Bim	Albert Lamorisse	1950	France
	Zanzabelle A Paris	Ladislav Starevitch, J. Starevitch	1947	France
Private Visions
The Bonnadieu House	La Maison Bonnadieu	Carlo Rim	1951	France
House of Pleasure	Le Plaisir	Max Ophüls	1952	France
Children of Paradise	Les Enfants Du Paradis	Marcel Carné	1945	France
The Well		Leo Popkin, Russell Rouse	1951	USA
Torment of the Past	Tormento Del Passato	Mario Bonnard	1952	Italy

== Awards - Unofficial ==
=== International Journalist Jury ===
- Premio giuria internazionale dei giornalisti: HUNTED by Charles Crichton
