= The Walls of Jericho (1948 film) =

1948 film directed by John M. Stahl

- Theatrical release poster
- Directed by: John M. Stahl
- Screenplay by: Lamar Trotti; Paul Wellman (novel)
- Produced by: Lamar Trotti
- Starring: Cornel Wilde; Linda Darnell; Anne Baxter; Kirk Douglas; Ann Dvorak; Marjorie Rambeau; Colleen Townsend
- Cinematography: Arthur C. Miller
- Edited by: James B. Clark
- Music by: Cyril J. Mockridge; Alfred Newman
- Production company: 20th Century Fox
- Distributed by: 20th Century Fox
- Release date: August 4, 1948
- Running time: 106 minutes
- Country: United States
- Language: English
- Box office: $1,750,000 (US rentals)

The Walls of Jericho is a 1948 American drama film directed by John M. Stahl, written by Lamar Trotti after the novel by Paul I. Wellman published in 1947. It stars Cornel Wilde, Linda Darnell, Anne Baxter, Kirk Douglas, Ann Dvorak, Colleen Townsend and Marjorie Rambeau. The picture was released by 20th Century Fox on August 4, 1948.

== Plot ==
In Jericho, Kansas, in the early 1910s, County attorney Dave Connors is stuck in an unhappy marriage to Belle. He invites his friends, newlyweds Tucker and Algeria Wedge, to come and visit. Algeria is secretly attracted to Dave and is frustrated that he does not return her feelings. When Dave decides to run for senator, Algeria encourages Tucker to run as well in an effort to make Tucker more like Dave.

Dave is reunited with an old friend, Julia Norman. She has been in love with Dave since childhood, and as they spend more time together, Dave begins to fall in love with her as well. They begin an affair, but they feel guilty, and Julia decides to leave Jericho.

Marjorie Ransom, a mutual friend of Dave and Julia, runs away from home one night and accidentally kills a man who was harassing her. She goes to Julia for help, and she and Dave agree to help her. Algeria has learned of Julia and Dave's affair and uses this information to spoil the trial and ruin Dave's chances of being elected as senator. Algeria tells Belle of Dave's infidelity. Belle shoots Dave, leaving Julia to defend Marjorie in court. Julia uses the opportunity to defend herself and Dave's relationship as well as publicly question Algeria's own obsession with Dave. Marjorie is found not guilty. The film ends with Julia going to visit Dave in the hospital.

== Cast ==
- Cornel Wilde as Dave Connors
- Linda Darnell as Algeria Wedge
- Anne Baxter as Julia Norman
- Kirk Douglas as Tucker Wedge
- Ann Dvorak as Belle Connors
- Marjorie Rambeau as Mrs. Dunham
- Henry Hull as Jefferson Norman
- Colleen Townsend as Marjorie Ransome
- Barton MacLane as Gotch McCurdy
- Griff Barnett as Judge Hutto
- William Tracy as Cully Caxton
- Art Baker as Peddigrew
- Gene Nelson as Assistant Prosecutor, uncredited
- Will Wright as Dr. Patterson, uncredited
