= Hello Elephant =

- Directed by: Gianni Franciolini
- Written by: Suso Cecchi d'Amico; Cesare Zavattini
- Produced by: Vittorio De Sica
- Cinematography: Anchise Brizzi
- Edited by: Eraldo Da Roma
- Music by: Alessandro Cicognini
- Release date: 1952
- Running time: 78 minutes
- Country: Italy
- Language: Italian

Hello Elephant (Italian: Buongiorno, elefante!) is a 1952 Italian comedy film directed by Gianni Franciolini and Vittorio De Sica. It was entered into the main competition at the 6th Locarno Film Festival.

== Cast ==
- Vittorio De Sica as Carlo Caretti
- María Mercader as Maria Caretti
- Sabu as Sultan of Nagore
- Nando Bruno as Mr. Venturi, landlord
- Gisella Sofio as Carlo's former lover
- Michele Sakara as Giovannino
- Ciro Berardi as Porter
- Giuseppe Chinnici as Police Commissioner

== Reception ==
A contemporary Corriere della Sera review described the film as "a funny little film that is halfway between Miracle in Milan and Umberto D."
