= 7th Locarno Film Festival =

Film festival in Locarno, Switzerland

- Location: Locarno, Switzerland
- Founded: 1946
- Festival date: Opening: 2 July 1953; Closing: 12 July 1953
- Website: Locarno Film Festival

Locarno Film Festival
- 8th 6th

The 7th Locarno Film Festival was held from 2 July to 12 July 1953 in Locarno, Switzerland. This was the first time the festival had a films for tourism section

The festival was also notable for screening films from three countries under Soviet influence, the Soviet Union (Russia), Hungary, and Czechoslovakia, despite many European festivals admitting no films from the Soviet bloc during this period. This is, in part, due to the fact that films at Locarno were submitted by their Swiss distributors not directly by their government.

== Official Sections ==
The following films were screened in these sections:

=== Pre-Program ===
Pre-Program
Original Title	English Title	Director(s)	Year	Production Country
Brücken Über Europa		Joachim Gunther, Walter Leckebusch	1950	Germany
Ciampino				Italy
Costumi Della Sardegna		Fiorenzo Serra		Italy
Halte! Frontiere Suisse				Switzerland
Immagini E Colori		Vittorio Sala	1938	Italy
Peccato Di Desiderio		M. Crispolti		Italy
Peccatori Di Laguna		Antonio Petrucci		Italy
Quick Das Eichhörnschen		Heinz Spielman	1953	Germany
Staré Povesti Ceské	Old Czech Legends	Jiri Trnka	1953	Czech Republic

=== Programme Principal ===
Programme Principal

Programme Principal
English Title	Original Title	Director(s)	Year	Production Country
Algiers - Cape Town	Alger - Le Cap	Serge de Poligny	1952	France
Wonderful Mentality	Belle Mentalite'	André Berthomieu	1953	France
Half a Century of Song	Canzoni Di Mezzo Secolo	Domenico Paolella	1952	Italy
Carnival	Carnaval	Henri Verneuil	1953	France
The Emperor and the Golem	Cisaruv Pekar	Martin Frič	1951	Czech Republic
	Citius-Altius-Fortius	Hannu Leminen	1952	Finland
Magic Concert	Concierto Magico	Rafael J. Salvia	1953	Spain
All Clues Lead to Berlin	Die Spur Führt Nach Berlin	František Čáp	1952	Germany
Girls' Dormitory	Dortoir Des Grandes	Henri Decoin	1953	France
Erkel		Márton Keleti	1952	Hungary
Europe '51	Europa '51	Roberto Rossellini	1952	Italy
Eager to Live	Febbre Di Vivere	Claudio Gora	1953	Italy
Ferdinand Hodler Face to Man	Ferdinand Hodler Face A L'Homme	Herbert E. v		Switzerland
Hell Raiders of the Deep	I Sette Dell'Orsa Maggiore	Duilio Coletti	1952	Italy
The Show Must Go On	Jianghu Ernü	Fei Mu, Zhu Shilin	1952	Hong Kong
Julius Caesar		David Bradley	1953	USA
The Composer Glinka	Kompositor Glinka	Grigorij Aleksandrov	1952	Russia
The Lady Without Camelias	La Signora Senza Camelie	Michelangelo Antonioni	1953	Italy
The Unfaithfuls	Le Infedeli	Steno Monicelli, Mario Monicelli	1953	Italy
The Father of the Girl	Le Père De Mademoiselle	Robert Dagan, Marcel L'Herbier	1953	France
My Six Convicts		Hugo Fregonese	1952	USA
Never Wave At A Wac		Norman Z. McLeod	1952	USA
Turtledove General Delivery	Postlagernd Turteltaube	Gerhard T. Buchholz	1952	Germany
Puccini		Carmine Gallone	1953	Italy
Rayes Des Vivants		Maurice Cloche	1952	France
The Magic Voyage of Sinbad	Sadko	Aleksandr Ptouchko	1953	Russia
The Glass Wall		Maxwell Shane	1953	USA
The Yellow Balloon		J. Lee Thompson	1953	Great Britain
Don't Forget Love	Vergiss Die Liebe Nicht	Paul Verhoeven	1953	Germany
In the Arctic	Wo Ldach Arktis	Aleksandr Sguridi	1953	Russia

=== Special Sections ===
Special Sections / Private Visions
Original Title	English Title	Director(s)	Year	Production Country
Carmen Proibita		G.M. Scotese	1953	Italy
Cronaca Di Un Delitto		Mario Sequi	1953	Italy
Non Ê Mai Troppo Tardi	It's Never Too Late	Carlo Carlini	1953	Italy
Potomok Tchingis-Khana	Storm Over Asia	Vsevolod Poudovkine	1928	Russia
Rund Um Den Kilimandscharo		G. Schneider		Switzerland
Siamo Tutti Inquilini		Mario Mattoli	1953	Italy
Son Dernier Noël	Her Last Christmas	Jacques Daniel-Norman	1952	France
Una Donna Prega		Anton Giulio Rajano	1953	Italy
Il Viale Della Speranza		Dino Risi	1953	Italy
Vozvrachtchenie Vassilia Bortnikova		Vsevolod Poudovkine	1952	Russia

=== International Tourism Film Review ===
Original Title	English Title	Director(s)	Year	Production Country
Ballon Vole				Switzerland
Baroque				Czech Republic
Bauernhochzeit In Der Schwalm				Germany
Carcassone, Vigie Occitane				France
Dafni (Panagia Hrysodafniotissa)	Daphni: The Virgin Of The Golden Laurels	George Hoynigen-Huene, Angelos Propkopiou	1951	Greece
Die Alte Deutsche Stadt				Germany
Fishing The Water Wilderness				USA
L'Or Vert, Tresor De La Finlande				Finland
La Chanson De La Foret				Czech Republic
La Finlande Vous Sourit				Finland
Land Of Enlightment				India
Le Rocce Di Eolo		Giovanni Paolucci		Italy
Music Of India				India
Noche De Grenada				Spain
Ousbekistan Sovietique				Switzerland
Presentation De La Beauce A Notre-Dame De Chartres				France
Promenade A Travers Le Danemark				Denmark
Reiseziel Aegypten				Switzerland
Road To Canterbury		David Eady	1952	Great Britain
Salzburger Welttheater				Austria
Sardegna		Ubaldo Magnaghi		Italy
Seville				Spain
Summertime In Attica				Greece
Travel Royal		Peter Bradford	1952	Great Britain
Yellowstone National Park				USA

=== Comic Cinema in the Silent Era ===
==== France - Early Comedies ====
Aspects of Comic Cinema At the Time of Mute / France (Primitive Comics)
English Title	Original Title	Director(s)	Year	Production Country
Boireau Domestique		André Deed	1907	France
Ten Wives for One Husband	Dix Femmes Pour Un Mari	Georges Hatot, Lucien Nonguet, Ferdinand Zecca	1905	France
The Waterer Watered	L'Arroseur Arrose	Louis Lumière	1895	France
Calino's Baptism	Le Baptême De Calino	Jean Durand	1907	France
Baby’s Breakfast	Le Dejeuner De Bebe	Émile Reynaud	1895	France
The False Cripple	Le Faux Cul De Jatte		1903	France
An Impossible Voyage	Le Voyage A Travers L'Impossible	G. Méliès	1904	France
Max as a Chriopodist	Max Pédicure	Max Linder	1914	France
Max Joins the Giants	Max Veut Grandir	Max Linder	1912	France
Max Takes Tonics	Max Victime Du Quinquina	Max Linder	1911	France
Rigadin and Miss Margaret	Rigadin Et Miss Margaret	Georges Monca	1907	France
Hunchback Brings Luck	Une Veine De Bossu	Max Linder	1908	France

==== Italy - Early Comedies ====
English Title	Original Title	Director(s)	Year	Production Country
Pedestrian Love	Amor Pedestre	Marcel Favre	1914	Italy
Cinessino and the Gramophone	Cinessino Il Grammofono	Conès	1914	Italy
Foolshead Looks for a Duel	Il Duello /Cretinetti Cerca Un Duello (?)	André Deed	1909	Italy
The Gallant Adventure of a Provincial	L'Avventura Galante Di Un Provinciale	Luca Comerio	1908	Italy
	La Sveglia	Travetti	1908	Italy
	Onomastico Della Moglie		1908	Italy
Polidor Gets Married	Polidor Si Sposa	Ferdinand Guillaume	1912	Italy
Tweedledum as a Cycling Policeman	Robinet Guardia Ciclista	Marcel Favre	1913	Italy

==== United States - Comedy And Satire ====
Original Title	English Title	Director(s)	Year	Production Country
L'Allegro Fante		Charles Reisner	1920	USA
Sunnyside		Charlie Chaplin	1919	USA

==== United States - Mack Sennett School ====
Italian Title	English Title	Director(s)	Year	Production Country
Fatty Portalettere		Roscoe Arbuckle	1917	USA
Harold Antiquario		Harold Lloyd	1919	USA
Il Solitario Luca	Lonesome Luke	Harold Lloyd		USA
Nel Paese Degli Armadilli		Buster Keaton	1918	USA
The Freshman		Harold Lloyd	1925	USA
Un'Avventura Nominata		Mack Sennett	1920	USA

== Independent Sections ==
=== Swiss Cinema ===
Swiss Cinema Retrospective Review
Original Title	English Title	Director(s)	Year	Production Country
Die Missbrauchten Liebesbriefe		Léopold Lindtberg	1940	Switzerland
Il Neige Sul Le Haut Pays		C.G. Duvanel	1944	Switzerland
L'Annee Vigneronne		C.G. Duvanel		Switzerland
La Vocation D'Andre Carel	The Vocation of André Carel	Jean Choux	1952	Switzerland
Romeo Und Julia Auf Dem Dorfe		Valerian Schmidely, Hans Trommer	1941	Switzerland
So Lebt China		Emil Berna, Lazare Wechsler	1936	Switzerland

== Awards ==
=== International Critics Jury ===
- Prize of the International Critics Jury: THE GLASS WALL directed by Maxwell Shane, KOMPOSITOR GLINKA directed by Grigorij Aleksandrov, JULIUS CAESAR directed by David Bradley

=== Jury of the Swiss Association of Film Journalists ===
- Prize of the Jury of the Swiss Association of Film Journalists: JULIUS CAESAR directed by David Bradley, STARE POVESTI CESKE directed by Jiri Trnka, THE UNFAITHFULS directed by Steno Vanzina
- Mention of the Jury of the Swiss Association of Film Journalists: Hans Trommer, Herbert Meyer, Charles-Georges Duvanel
