= Richard C. Halverson =

United States Senate chaplain (1916-1995)

The Reverend Richard Christian Halverson
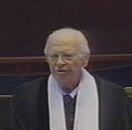

60th Chaplain of the United States Senate
- In office 2 February 1981 – 11 March 1995
- President: Ronald Reagan; George H. W. Bush; Bill Clinton
- Preceded by: Edward L. R. Elson
- Succeeded by: Lloyd John Ogilvie

Personal details
- Born: 5 February 1916 Pingree, North Dakota, US
- Died: 28 November 1995 (aged 79) Arlington, Virginia, US
- Spouse: Doris Grace Seaton (m. 1942)
- Children: 3
- Education: Valley City State Teacher College; Wheaton College BS (1939); Princeton Theological Seminary BTh
- Occupation: Christian minister

Richard Christian Halverson (6 February 1916 – 28 November 1995) was an American Presbyterian minister and author who served as the chaplain of the United States Senate.

== Biography ==
He was born in Pingree, North Dakota. He attended Valley City State Teacher College in Valley City, North Dakota, before earning a Bachelor of Science degree from Wheaton College in Wheaton, Illinois, in 1939, participating in the Wheaton College Men's Glee Club. He then earned a Bachelor of Theology degree from Princeton Theological Seminary. Christian educator Henrietta Mears (1890–1963) of the First Presbyterian Church of Hollywood had a significant influence on his life. He became the Assistant Pastor at First Presbyterian of Hollywood and was part of the Burning Hearts Fellowship along with Louis Evans, Jr., Bill Bright, Billy Graham, Roy Rogers and others.

Halverson was a minister of the former United Presbyterian Church in the United States of America and served from 1958 until 1981 as the Senior Pastor of the Fourth Presbyterian Church, in Bethesda, Maryland. He served as the 60th Chaplain of the United States Senate from 2 February 1981 until 11 March 1995. He was an associate of the National Prayer Breakfast movement (sponsored by the Fellowship Foundation (Note: also known informally as The Family and The Fellowship)) starting in 1956 along with Bill Bright and Douglas Coe. Halverson became executive director of the Fellowship Foundation in 1969 (upon the death of its prior leader Abraham Vereide). Halverson also was a member of the Board of World Vision, from 1956 to 1983, serving as chairman from 1966 to 1983. He was the president of Concern Ministries, a charitable foundation in Washington, D.C.

Halverson was married on 2 February 1942 to Doris Grace Seaton (1915–2009) and they had three children.

Halverson died (from congestive heart failure) on 28 November 1995 at Arlington Hospital in Arlington Virginia at the age of 79.

== Awards ==
Halverson received the Distinguished Alumnus Award from Valley City State University on 20 May 1977, and an honorary Doctorate of Laws degree from Wheaton College. He received the Theodore Roosevelt Rough Rider Award from the state of North Dakota on 26 March 1994.

== Books ==
Halverson authored several books in the 1950s–1990s, including:

- Christian Maturity, with foreword by Dr. Louis H. Evans, Zondervan/Cowman, 1956. Eight subsequent printings.
- The quiet men: the secret to personal success and effectiveness by men who practice it, 1963
- Relevance: The Role of Christianity in the Twentieth Century, 1968
- A Day at a Time, 1974
- Somehow inside of Eternity, January 1981
- Timelessness of Jesus Christ, January 1982
- Word of a Gentleman: Meditations for Modern Man, December 1983
- Man to Man, January 1984
- Living Fellowship, January 1986
- No Greater Power: Perspective for Days of Pressure, August 1986
- We the People, July 1987
- Wisdom on Faith, April 1995
- Wisdom on the Church, April 1995
- Wisdom on America, December 1995
- Wisdom on Life, December 1995

Additionally, he wrote the introduction for the following:

- My Utmost for His Highest, by Oswald Chambers
- Our Presbyterian Heritage, by Paul R. Carlson

== See also ==
- Fellowship Foundation (The Family)
- National Prayer Breakfast
- Bill Bright
- Douglas Evans Coe
- Christian fundamentalism
- Christian right

== Notes ==
Religious titles
Preceded by Edward L.R. Elson	60th US Senate Chaplain; 2 February 1981 – 11 March 1995	Succeeded by Lloyd John Ogilvie
