= F. Dale Bruner =

American biblical scholar (born 1932)

Frederick Dale Bruner (born 1932) is an American biblical scholar.

== Career ==
Frederick Dale Bruner is a theologian and author of several works, including a critical examination of Pentecostal theology, entitled "A Theology of the Holy Spirit," and his multi-volumed commentaries on the Gospels of Matthew and John (all three published by Eerdmans). Bruner, who calls himself a Reformed biblical theologian, writes principally for the Church, not the Academy, and considers this the highest calling of theological exegetes.

Bruner became a Christian under the teaching of Henrietta Mears at the First Presbyterian Church of Hollywood. It was there that he met his wife Kathy and discerned his call to be a professor and missionary. After completing his doctorate in Germany in 1963, he was a missionary of the Presbyterian Church (U.S.A.) at Union Theological Seminary in Manila, Philippines, from 1964–1975. From 1975–1997, Bruner taught at Whitworth College in Spokane, Washington, and held the position of George and Lyda Wasson Professor Emeritus of Religion. Since his retirement, a chaired position was created in his honor, which is currently held by theologian, Dr. Jonathan Moo. Other holders of the endowed chair included Dr. James R. Edwards, and Dr. Adam Neder.

Since 1997, Bruner has been on the adjunct faculty at the Fuller Theological Seminary, in Pasadena, California, where he continues to write and research. During the spring 1998 semester, he was Senior Mission Scholar at the Overseas Ministries Study Center and a Research Fellow at Yale Divinity School. Bruner also taught a weekly bible study class from September 1998 through June 2016 at the First Presbyterian Church of Hollywood, which was his home church while a college student at Occidental.

Bruner has two sons and four grandchildren. He and his wife lived in Pasadena, California, until her death in June 2025.

== Education ==
Bruner earned his bachelor's degree from Occidental College in 1954. He earned his Master of Divinity from Princeton Theological Seminary, and his Doctor of Theology (Th.D.) at the University of Hamburg in Germany in 1963.

== Works ==
=== Commentaries ===
- The Letter to the Romans: A Short Commentary (Eerdmans, 2021). ISBN 9781467463010, 1467463019
- The Gospel of John: A Commentary (Eerdmans, 2012). ISBN 9781467434775, 1467434779
- Matthew: A Commentary (2 volumes; revised and expanded edition, Eerdmans, 2004). ISBN 9780802811189, 0802811183

=== Monographs ===
- A Theology of the Holy Spirit: The Pentecostal Experience and the New Testament Witness (Eerdmans,1970). ISBN 9781579100940, 1579100945
- The Holy Spirit, Shy Member of the Trinity (Augsburg, 1984). ISBN 0806620684

=== Journal articles ===
- “The Why and How of Commentary,” Theology Today 46, no. 4 (January 1990): 399-404.
- “The Son Is God inside Out: A Response to Stephen B. Bevans, S.V.D.,” International Bulletin of Missionary Research 22, no. 3 (July 1, 1998): 106–8, https://doi.org/10.1177/239693939802200303.

=== Podcasts ===
Pastoral and Scholastic Earthiness - Frederick Dale Bruner on the Expositors Collective Podcast
