= Colleen Townsend =

American actress

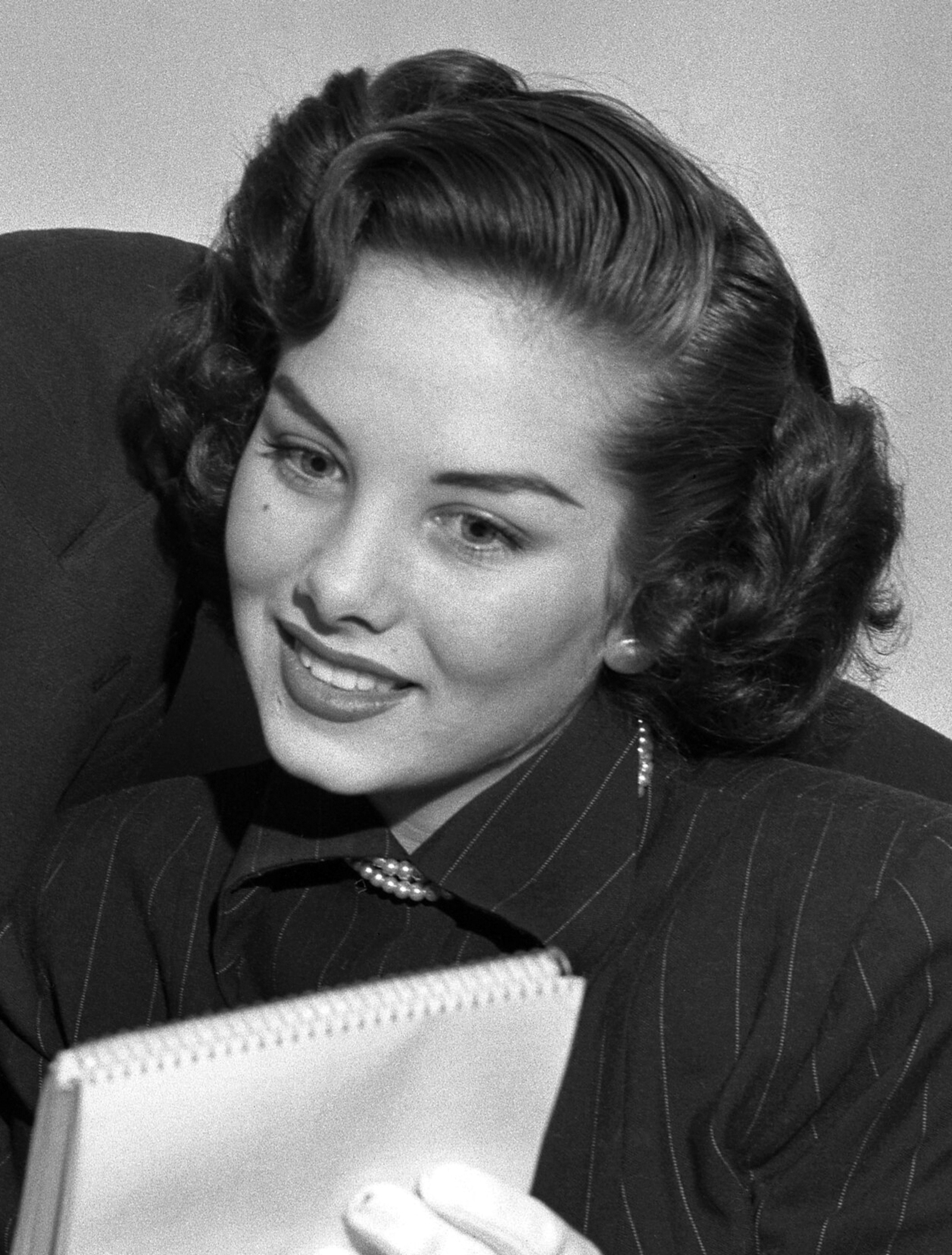
- Townsend (1949)
- Born: December 21, 1928 (age 97); Glendale, California, U.S.
- Other names: Colleen Townsend Evans; Colleen Evans
- Occupations: Actress, writer and humanitarian
- Spouse: Louis H. Evans, Jr. (m. 1950–2008) (his death)

Colleen Townsend Evans (born December 21, 1928) is an American actress, author and humanitarian.

== Early years ==
Townsend was born in Glendale, California. Her parents separated "when she was a tot," after which she lived with her mother. She attended Brigham Young University, leaving during her sophomore year to pursue a film career.

== Life and career ==
When Townsend was 15 years old, she began performing on television as a member of the dramatic company at station W6XAO in Los Angeles. A talent scout saw her work there, which led to her signing a contract with Warner Bros.

Townsend began a film career in 1944, appearing in minor roles in several films. By 1946, she was appearing on the cover of magazines, and in 1947, she was signed to a contract by 20th Century Fox. She was the subject of a cover story for Life in 1948, which discussed the way in which major studios groomed and manufactured their stars, using Townsend's story as an example. The studio created a photographic calendar for her to "put [her] face in every home, office and barracks in America all year around". Hedda Hopper was quoted as saying that Townsend was "going places."

She played a featured role in the film The Walls of Jericho (1948), and she was billed third behind Dan Dailey and Celeste Holm in Chicken Every Sunday (1949). Her biggest success was in the 1950 film When Willie Comes Marching Home, in which she was paired with Dan Dailey. Again Pioneers (1950), which she wrote, provided her with her first lead role.

She grew up attending the Church of Jesus Christ of Latter-day Saints, and attended Brigham Young University for a short time. In 1948, she became active in First Presbyterian Church of Hollywood. In 1950, Townsend left her acting career and married long-time friend Louis H. Evans Jr., who was a seminary student at the time at San Francisco Theological Seminary. Evans was the founding pastor of Bel Air Presbyterian Church, which began in the Evans home. Bel Air Presbyterian Church exists today as the largest Presbyterian congregation in the Los Angeles area.

Later, the couple met and became friends with Billy and Ruth Graham. Townsend, now billed as Colleen Evans, returned to films briefly, starring in two films produced by the Billy Graham Evangelistic Association: Oiltown, U.S.A. (1950) and Souls in Conflict (1955).

== Post-acting ==
Colleen and Louis Evans moved to Washington, D.C. where he served at National Presbyterian Church. Thereafter she dedicated herself to humanitarian work, specifically in relation to racial or religious discrimination, human rights, and the role of women in society. She partnered with her husband in ministry and served on the board of World Vision. She served as the first female chair of the Billy Graham Crusade in 1986.

== Filmography ==
Year	Title	Role
1944	Janie	Hortense Bennett
1944	The Very Thought of You	Young bride
1944	Hollywood Canteen	Junior hostess
1945	Pillow to Post	WAC's daughter
1945	Sing Your Way Home	Girl
1948	Scudda Hoo! Scudda Hay!	Girl leaving church service
1948	The Walls of Jericho	Marjorie Ransome
1949	Chicken Every Sunday	Rosemary Hefferan
1950	When Willie Comes Marching Home	Marjorie Fettles
1950	Again Pioneers	Sallie Keeler
1952	The Great Discovery	Connie
1953	Oiltown, U.S.A.	Christine Manning

== See also ==
- Pin-ups of Yank, the Army Weekly
