= First Presbyterian Church of Hollywood =

Presbyterian church in California

Coordinates: 34.103213°N 118.322193°W

The First Presbyterian Church of Hollywood is a Presbyterian Church (USA) congregation in the Hollywood neighborhood of Los Angeles, California, that has had a significant impact on both the Presbyterian Church and evangelical Christianity around the world.

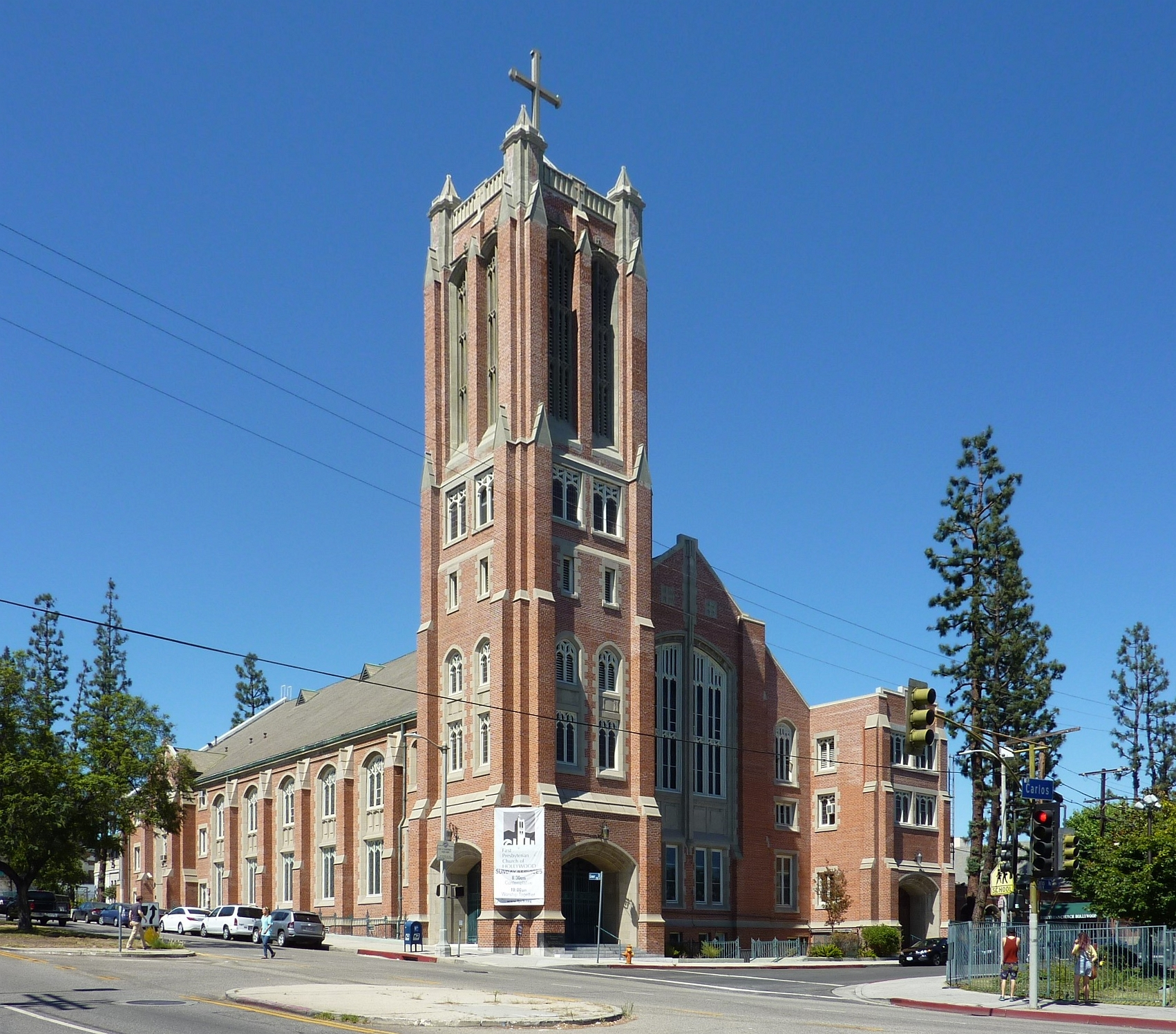
The First Presbyterian Church of Hollywood, 2015.

The church was founded in 1903. A large brick Gothic Revival sanctuary was built in 1923, and seats 1,800, with a balcony on both sides and in the back. The church campus covers a full square block on Gower Street, one block north of Hollywood Boulevard and three blocks from Hollywood and Vine.

The church also founded "Grace Community Church of the Valley" as a mission, later to become Grace Community Church, which was pastored by John F. MacArthur from 1969 to his death in 2025.

== History ==
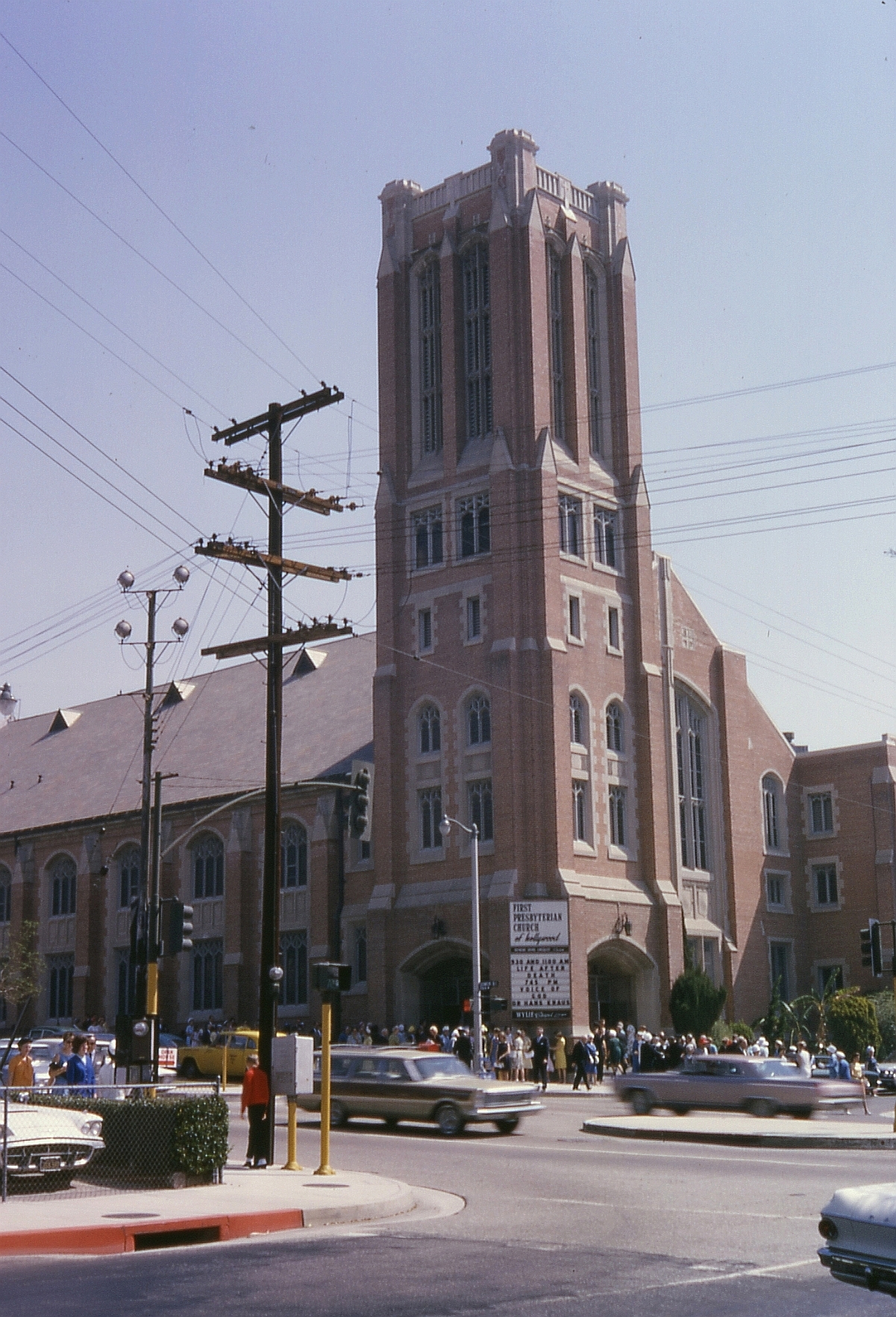
Front of the First Presbyterian Church of Hollywood, August, 1964.

Stewart P. MacLennan pastored the church from 1921 to 1941, and it was through his ministry that the Hollywood Church turned into a thriving mega-church in the 1920s, with its growth from 651 members in 1920 to 2370 members by 1930. A renowned preacher, he dreamed that it would be a center for Christian education and a "lighthouse" for the Word of God. In 1927 he met Henrietta Mears in Minneapolis and invited her to come and be a full-time Christian Education Director at the church. From 1928 to 1941 they worked together as a ministry team—his preaching and her teaching—developing a nationally known ministry. When he left, the Church called Louis H. Evans Sr. to be their pastor.

Henrietta Mears served as the Christian Education Director from 1928 until her death in 1963. She became famous for growing the Sunday school from 400 to over 4000 in the first two-and-a-half years of ministry at the church. The Sunday school curriculum she created became the foundation for Gospel Light Press. Mears also founded the Forest Home Christian Conference Center in the San Bernardino Mountains. Mears is remembered for mentoring over 400 men and women into full-time ministry, including: Richard C. Halverson, F. Dale Bruner, Darrell Guder, Donn Moomaw, Louis Evans Jr., Colleen Townsend Evans, Margaret Kerry, Bill Bright, and she encouraged and counseled Billy Graham.

Louis H. Evans, Sr. was senior pastor from 1941 to 1953, during which time the membership grew from 1,400 to its peak of 8,900, according to the church's website. Evans left to become “Minister at Large” for the Presbyterian Board of National Missions.

Evans was succeeded by Raymond I. Lindquist, who served the church until 1971. After declining somewhat, membership was restored to 8,388. During these years, the church drew congregants from an area much larger than the Hollywood community, taking advantage of its access to the Los Angeles freeway system (the church is located one block south of the Gower Street exit from the Hollywood Freeway). In Lindquist's tenure, overflow congregations were the norm, with the sanctuary filled for Sunday morning services at 9:30 and 11:00. In the early 1960s, overflow congregations were served in the church gymnasium (the pre-1923 sanctuary) by closed-circuit television. Lindquist died in 2001.

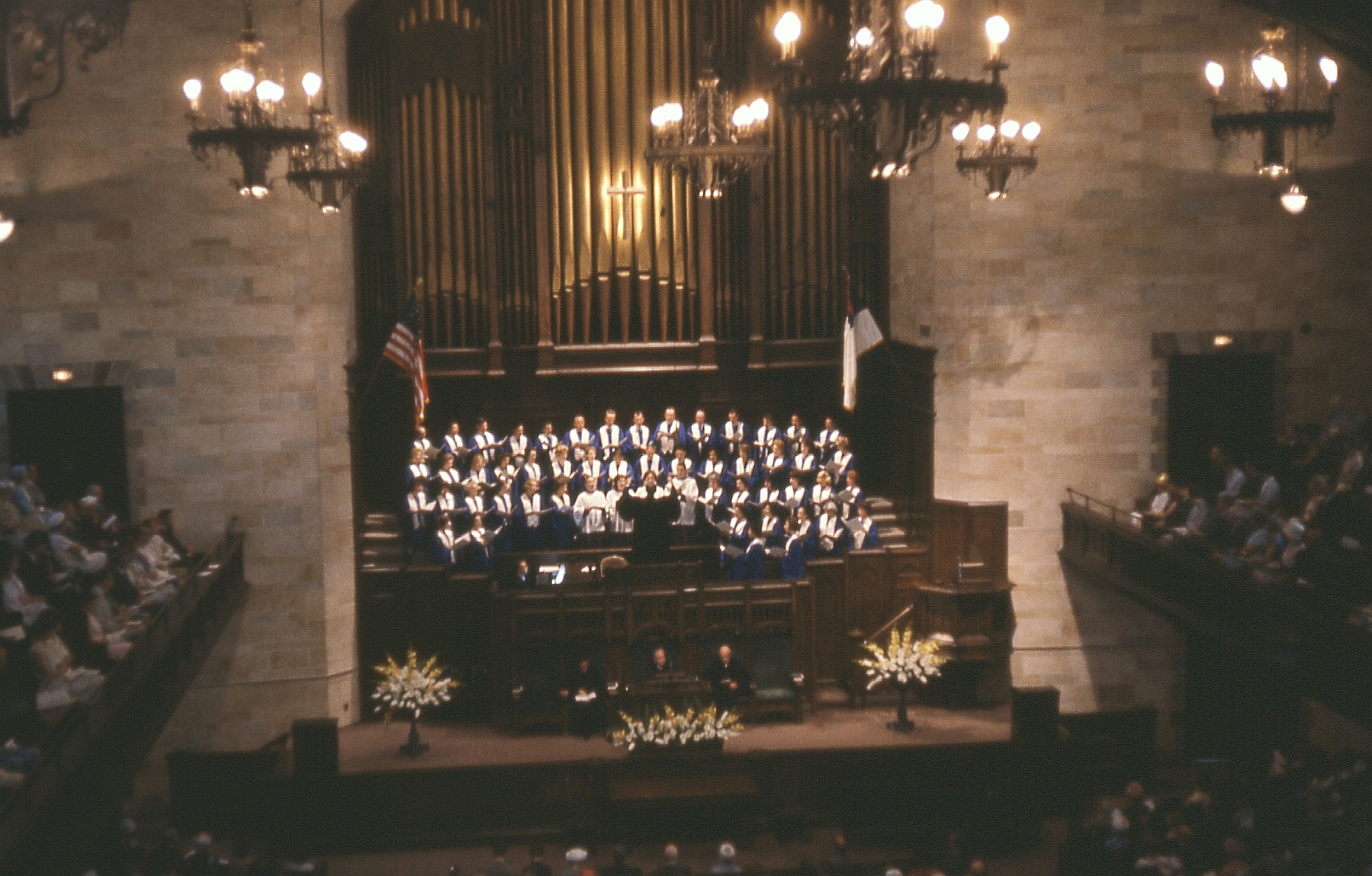
The choir performing during a Sunday morning service, August, 1964

Lloyd John Ogilvie became Senior Pastor in 1972. Ogilvie's ministry extended beyond the physical doors of the church through his successful nationwide televised ministry. His ministry was also of a significant impact to those in the entertainment industry. Ogilvie left on March 11, 1995, to become Chaplain of the United States Senate. Ogilvie was the second former Hollywood Presbyterian minister to serve in that capacity.

Ogilvie was followed by Alan Meenan in 1997. An Irishman, Meenan had received a Ph.D degree from the University of Edinburgh, Scotland. He served the church for eight years during which time members and adherents numbered in excess of 3,000 persons. A long incremental decline in Sunday morning worship attendance was arrested under his tenure and the church entered a new season of growth. Four different Sunday morning services were instituted to reflect contemplative, classic, and contemporary worship styles. Increase in Sunday attendance was complemented by more than 700 people participating in Meenan's mid-week Bible study course, "The Word Is Out." In 2005, disagreements with the Presbytery of the Pacific caused Meenan to renounce the jurisdiction of the Presbyterian Church (USA).

The church in Hollywood entered a period of upheaval after dissolving its relationship with Meenan. Two new congregations broke off from the Presbyterian Church (USA) during this time. Ecclesia Church Hollywood grew out of one of FPCH's contemporary services while Church for the Nations met in Glendale, California. The ministry of FPCH continued with Gary Stratman serving as interim pastor until 2009 when the duties of a dual interim pastorship were filled by Paul Pierson and Bill Hansen.

In 2010 Daniel Baumgartner became the new senior pastor until 2019. Hollywood Presbyterian has historically been an evangelical church in a liberal Christian denomination. In May 2013, the Session of Hollywood Presbyterian Church voted to affiliate with the Fellowship of Presbyterians, an evangelical group of churches within the PCUSA.

After Baumgartner's departure in 2019, the church called Tim Eichler as the interim pastor. FPCH entered a period of significant decline and staff loss under the leadership of the Session and Tim Eichler from 2020 to 2021, a decline that was exacerbated by the COVID pandemic. From 2022 to 2024, the church had two more transitional pastors, Rev. Dr. Mark Brewer (2022-2023), and Rev. Dr. Clark Cowden (2024-2025). In February 2025, Rev. J.T. Tarter took the role as pastor.

== See also ==
- Presbyterian Church (USA)
