= Colpa del sole =

Colpa Del Sole
- Directed by: Alberto Moravia
- Written by: Alberto Moravia
- Starring: Strelsa Brown, Giancarlo Sbragia, Clotilde Scarpitta
- Release date: 1951
- Country: Italy
- Language: Italian

Colpa Del Sole is a 1951 Italian film.

== Cast ==
Strelsa Brown, Giancarlo Sbragia, Clotilde Scarpitta
