= Cal Thomas =

American conservative writer (born 1942)

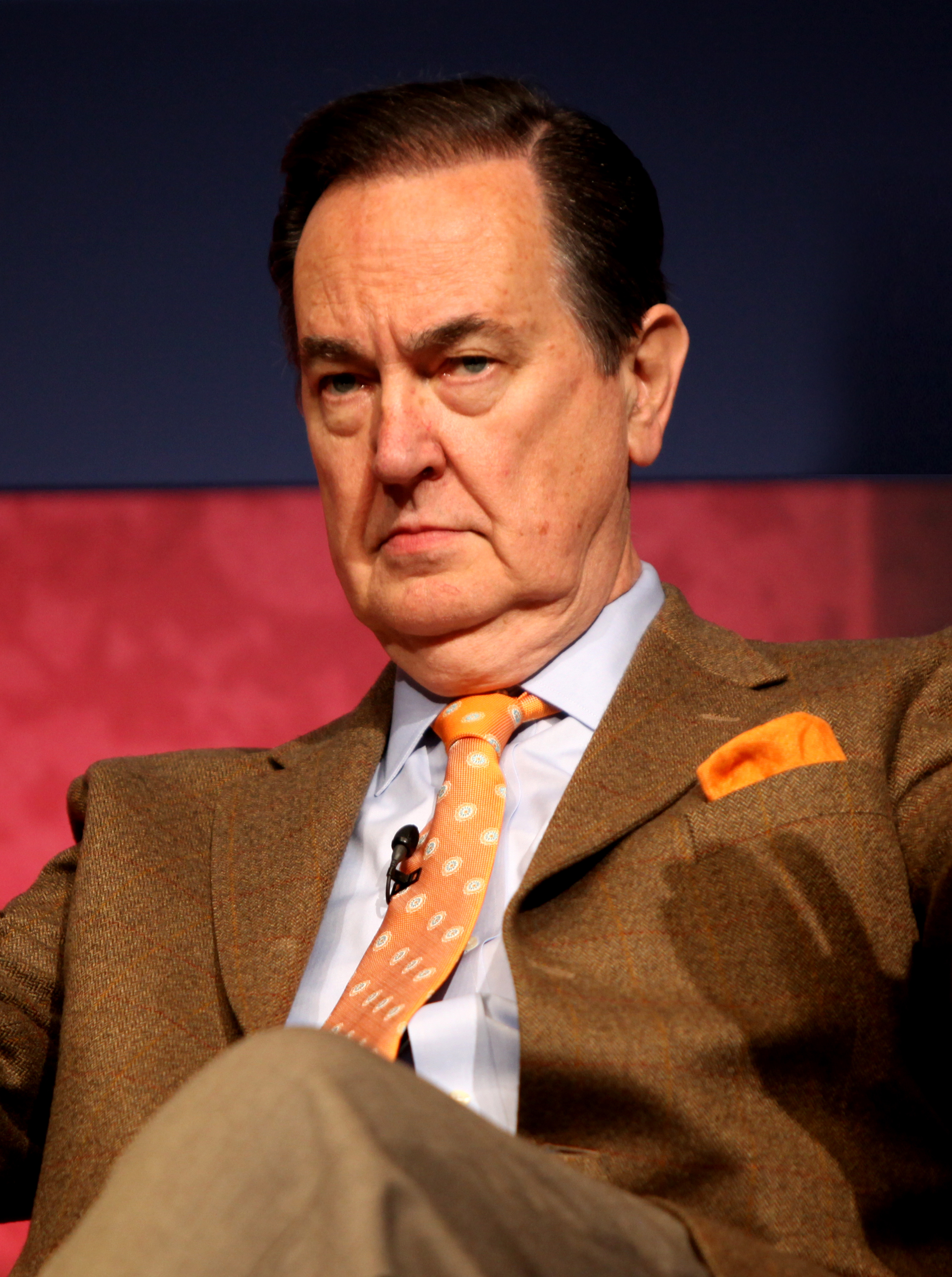
- Thomas in February 2012
- Born: John Calvin Thomas; December 2, 1942 (age 83); Washington, D.C., U.S.
- Education: American University
- Occupations: Political commentator, author, columnist

John Calvin Thomas (born December 2, 1942) is an American syndicated columnist, author and radio commentator.

== Early life and education ==
Thomas was born in 1942 in Washington, D.C. He attended American University for his undergraduate education.

== Career ==
During the 1960s and early 1970s he worked as a reporter at NBC News. During a hiatus in his undergraduate education, he joined the U.S. Army, and served at the Armed Forces Radio in New York. His program on CNBC was nominated for a CableACE Award in 1995. His column, which began in 1984, is syndicated by Tribune Content Agency. Thomas joined Fox News as a political contributor in 1997. He was a panelist on Fox News Watch, a Fox News Channel program critiquing media coverage, and until September 2005 hosted After Hours with Cal Thomas on the same network. He also gives a daily radio commentary, syndicated by Salem Radio Network.

From 2005 until the end of 2015, Thomas had been a columnist for USA Today, where he wrote articles with friend and political opposite, Bob Beckel, in the style of "point–counterpoint".

Thomas has written extensively about political issues and he supports, among other things, many American positions related to Israel.

He has written 10 books, including Blinded by Might, that discussed, among other things, the role of the Moral Majority in American politics of the 1980s. Thomas was vice president of the Moral Majority from 1980 to 1985. Thomas is an evangelical Christian, and a member of Fourth Presbyterian Church in Bethesda, Maryland, affiliated with the Evangelical Presbyterian Church.

== Political views ==
=== Israel ===
In 2014, Thomas criticized the U.S. President Barack Obama for "treating Israel as an enemy". In a 2023 column, Thomas affirmed his support for Israel and the Zionist movement. In a 2014 Washington Times article, Thomas claims, "Iranian nuclear negotiators joined with Holocaust deniers, 9/11 truthers and anti-Semites from across the globe."

=== Islam ===
In his article "Mumbai Explained", syndicated in December 2008, Thomas wrote that "no new [mosques] should be built" in Western countries following the Mumbai terrorist attacks. He further claimed that Muslim immigration posed a danger to the UK and United States.

Following the June 2016 massacre at the Pulse gay nightclub by ISIS sympathizer Omar Mateen, Thomas called for a moratorium on construction of mosques in the United States until "radical Islamist ideology" could be "defeated".

=== LGBT rights ===
After Bill Clinton became the first sitting United States president to address a gay rights organization, the Human Rights Campaign, Thomas published a column in November 1997 opposing homosexuality, in which he said:

God designed norms for behavior that are in our best interests. When we act outside those norms—such as for premarital sex, adultery, or homosexual sex—we cause physical, emotional, and spiritual damage to ourselves and to our wider culture. The unpleasant consequences of divorce and sexually transmitted diseases are not the result of intolerant bigots seeking to denigrate others. They are the result of violating God's standards, which were made for our benefit.

— Cal Thomas, "Immutable Morals"

Thomas published a similar column on October 16, 2009, after Barack Obama became the second sitting United States president to address the Human Rights Campaign. Thomas said:

We will get more of what we tolerate. Sexual behavior is an important cultural and moral issue. Mr. Obama won the election with just 52 percent of the popular vote and a margin of 7 percent over Sen. John McCain. This should not be seen as a mandate for him and his administration to make over America in a secular and liberal image. Neither should it be seen as an invitation to give blanket approval to homosexuality, considered by some to be against the best interests of the people who practice it as well as the nations that accept it.

— Cal Thomas, "Don't Ask, Tell or Legitimize"

== Personal life ==
Thomas was married to Charlotte Ray Thomas for 51 years until her death in 2017. Thomas married CJ Berwick, a classmate from Walter Johnson High School, in 2018. The couple reside in Key Largo, Florida as of 2020.

== Bibliography ==
External videos
- Booknotes interview with Thomas on The Things That Matter Most, July 10, 1994, C-SPAN

- 2020, America's Expiration Date: The Fall of Empires and Superpowers… and the Future of the United States (ISBN 0-310-35753-5)
- Thomas, Cal (2014). What works : commonsense solutions to the nation's problems. Grand Rapids, MI: Zondervan. ISBN 978-0-310-33946-5. LCCN 2013041232.
- 2008, "Mumbai Explained" Cal Thomas Chicago Tribune/Daily Yomiuri
- Thomas, Cal; Beckel, Bob (2007). Common Ground: How to Stop the Partisan War That Is Destroying America (1st ed.). New York: William Morrow. ISBN 978-0-06-123634-1. LCCN 2008541878. OCLC 166295043.
- 2001, The Wit & Wisdom of Cal Thomas (ISBN 1-58660-299-3)
- 1999, Blinded by Might with Ed Dobson (ISBN 0-310-22650-3)
- 1994, The Things That Matter Most (ISBN 0-06-017083-2)
- 1988, The Death of Ethics in America (ISBN 0-8499-0638-5)
- 1983, Book Burning (ISBN 0-89107-284-5)

== See also ==
- List of newspaper columnists
