= Bel Air Church =

Church in Los Angeles, California, US

Coordinates: 34.130581°N 118.485296°W

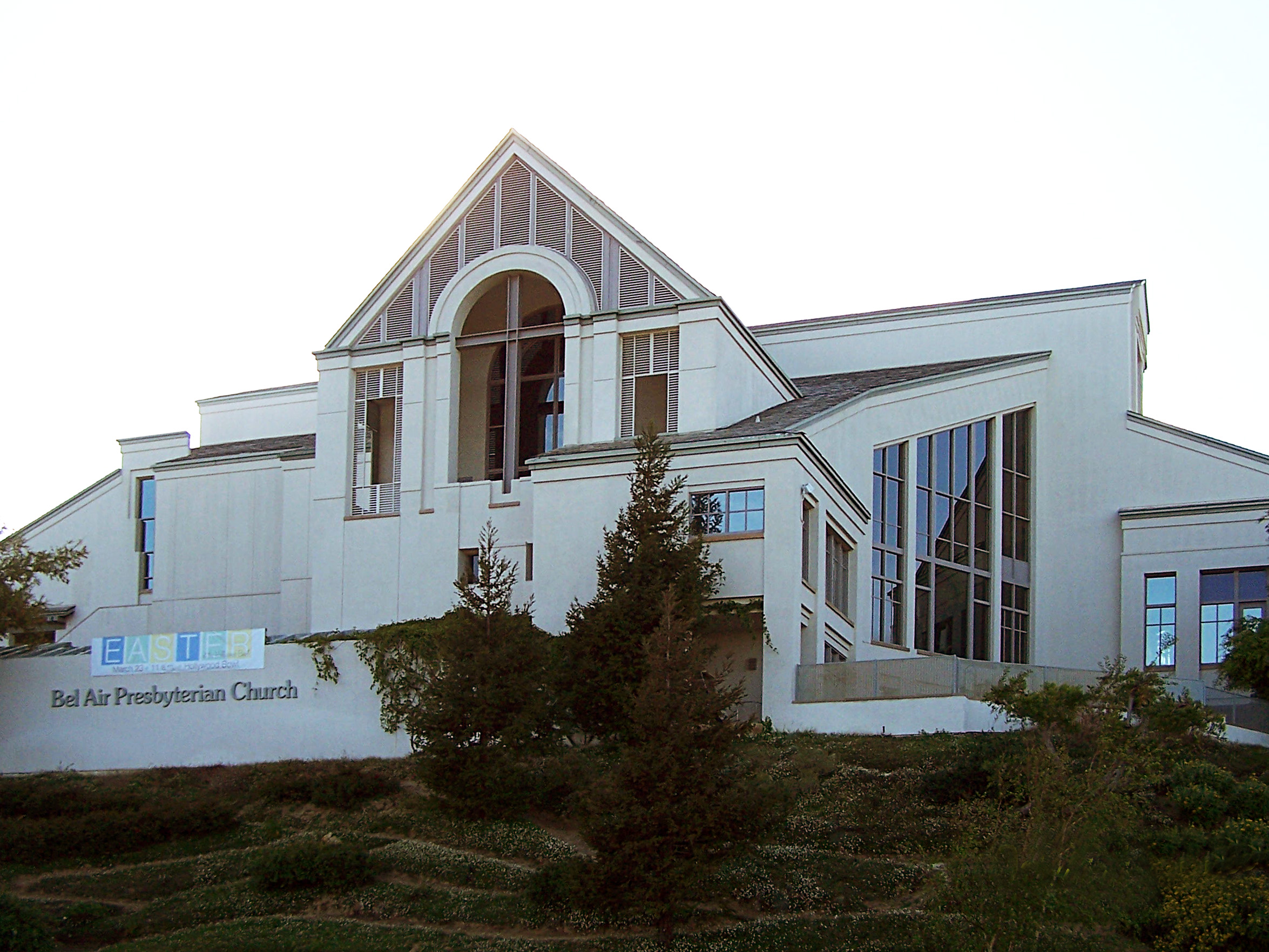
- Bel Air Church
- Location: 16221 Mulholland Drive, Los Angeles, CA 90049
- Country: United States
- Denomination: Presbyterian Church (USA)
- Website: www.belair.org

History
- Founded: 1956

Bel Air Church (also known as Bel Air Presbyterian Church) is a Presbyterian church located in Los Angeles, California. Its campus is located on Mulholland Drive in the Encino neighborhood.

== History ==
The Bel Air Church was founded in 1956 in Los Angeles. It met in the home of Rev Louis H. Evans Jr for four years and then moved to its current building on the "Educational Corridor" on Mulholland Drive, overlooking the San Fernando Valley.

In 2007, the church completed a $12 million campus expansion program, The Campaign for Bel Air: Phase I, which included the two-story Education Building, Discipleship Center, and Administration Building, including staff offices overlooking the San Fernando Valley. The campus also has a full-service café.

Former senior pastors include Louis H. Evans Jr., Mark Brewer, Michael H. Wenning, Paul Pierson, David G. McKechnie, Donn D. Moomaw, Michael Wenning, and Mark Brewer. Moomaw gave the invocation at President Ronald Reagan's first inauguration in 1981. He also gave the invocation at President Reagan's state funeral and presided over a private service for the family of First Lady Nancy Reagan before her state funeral at the Reagan Library.

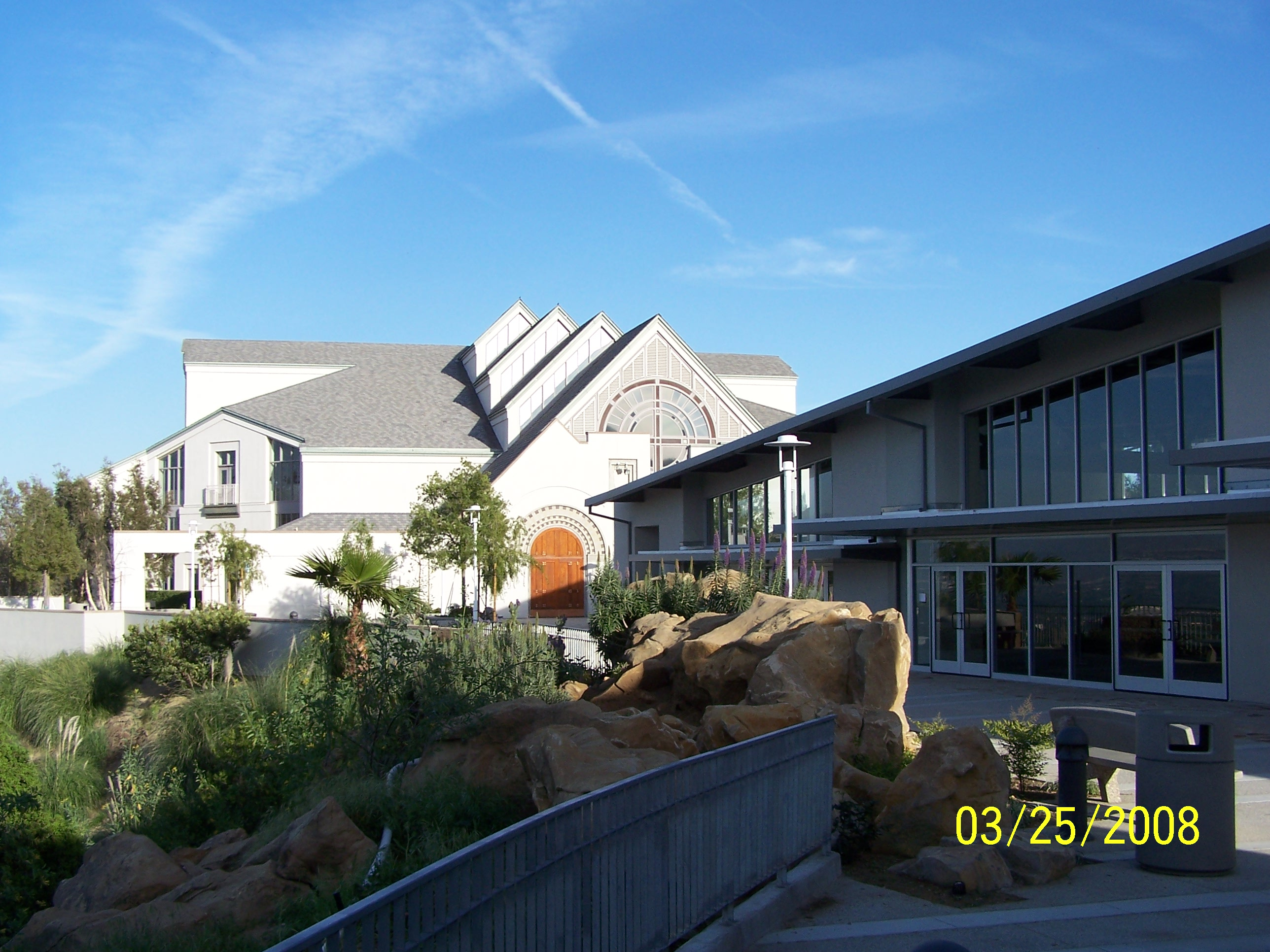
Sanctuary and Discipleship Center

Drew Sams was officially ordained as the church's senior pastor and head of staff on April 13, 2014, where he joined Care Crawford, Kim Dorr-Tilley, and later Mike Morgan on the church's leadership team.

== Congregation ==
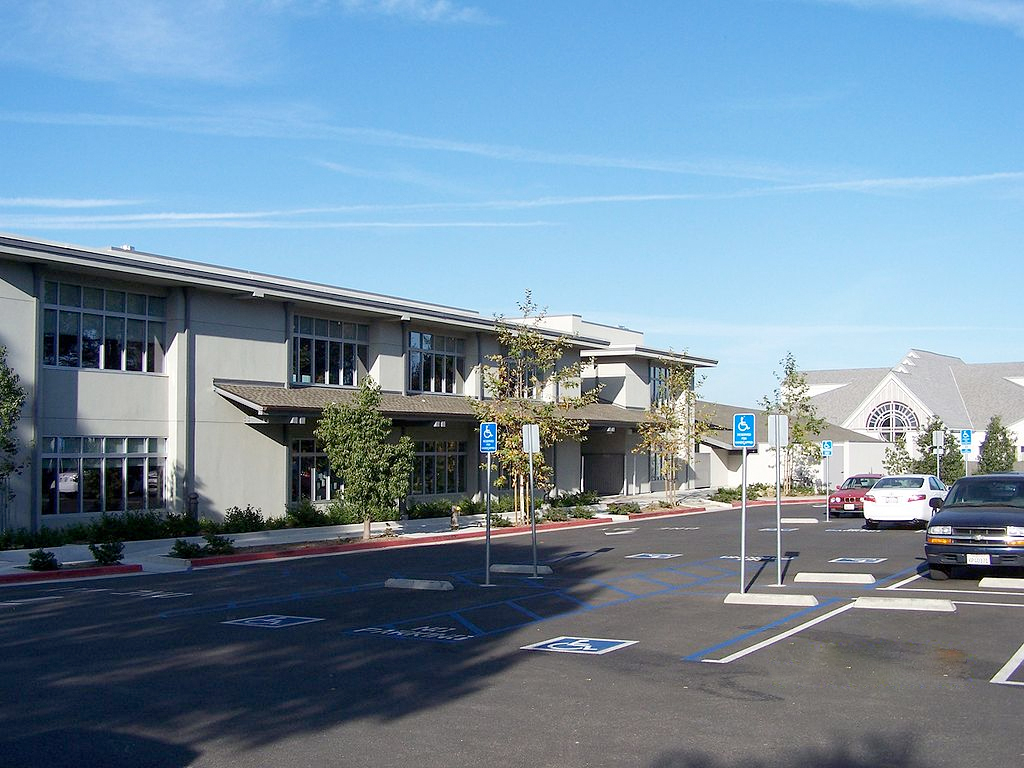
Administrative and Classroom Buildings

Some notable members of the church include:

- Denzel Washington
- Ronald Reagan
- Nancy Reagan
- Leonardo DiCaprio
- Cory Edwards

== Activities ==
Bel Air Church helped found "Imagine LA", a mentorship program that matches families exiting homelessness with volunteer teams from faith communities, corporations, and other committed organizations.

The church has an outreach department that partners with other community service organizations in Los Angeles.

On Jewish High Holy Days, the Church hosts services for the Stephen S. Wise Temple, a Reform Jewish congregation in the same neighborhood as Bel Air Church.

In 2018, the church packed and distributed over 10,000 meals to those in need at Thanksgiving. This annual work started in 1986. The church also ran free Christmas concerts later that year.
