= Holy laughter =

Religious behaviour

Holy laughter is a term used within charismatic Christianity that describes a religious behaviour in which individuals spontaneously laugh during church meetings. It has occurred in many revivals throughout church history, but it became normative in the early 1990s in Neo-charismatic churches and the Third Wave of the Holy Spirit. Many people claimed to experience this phenomenon at a large revival in Toronto, Ontario, Canada known as the Toronto Blessing.

== History ==
Practices similar to holy laughter were observed in the 1800s in Holiness Christian meetings on the American West. John Wesley encountered uncontrollable laughter in his Methodist meetings, and viewed it as an act of God. It also occurred in Signs and Wonders meetings run by John Wimber in the 1980s. The practice came to prominence in meetings led by the South African evangelist Rodney Howard-Browne in 1993 at the Carpenter's Home Church in Lakeland, Florida and was often accompanied by the "Slain in the Spirit" phenomena. The laughter ranges from very quiet to loud convulsive hysterics, which are said to be accompanied by temporary dissociation. It was also observed in meetings held at Oral Roberts University. The phenomena was then popularized by Charisma and the Trinity Broadcasting Network, and became controversial within charismatic Christianity.

Though primarily found in Protestant churches, it was observed in some parts of the Catholic Charismatic Renewal, as well. The practice spread to the Association of Vineyard Churches, most notably to the Toronto Airport Christian Fellowship in 1994. Religious revival meetings at the church became very popular, drawing 75,000 visitors that year. Many attendees at the meetings spent time laughing loudly while lying on the floor.

== Analysis ==
Leaders who have promoted holy laughter said the laughter was a result of joy that was supernaturally being given to people in the meetings. They said the joy was often accompanied by miraculous healing and the cessation of depression. Margaret Poloma of the University of Akron has described the events of the services as a ritual facilitation of catharsis. Philip Richter of STETS has drawn a parallel between holy laughter and laughter yoga.

== Reception ==
Many of the activities at these meetings, particularly the laughter, were controversial within evangelical Christianity. While some religious leaders such as Pat Robertson embraced the movement, groups including the Christian Research Institute and the Southern Baptist Convention condemned what was occurring. Critics charge that the practice is the result of psychological manipulation, or demonic possession.

== See also ==
- Gelotology
- Slain in the Spirit
- Theories of humor

== Bibliography ==
- Cimino, Richard P. (2001), Trusting the spirit: renewal and reform in American religion, John Wiley & Sons, ISBN 978-0-7879-5160-3
- Diamond, Sara (2000), Not by Politics Alone: The Enduring Influence of the Christian Right, Guilford Press, ISBN 978-1-57230-494-9
- Poloma, Margaret M. (2003), Main street mystics: the Toronto blessing and reviving Pentecostalism, Rowman Altamira, ISBN 978-0-7591-0354-2
- Richter, Philip (1996), Stanley E. Porter (ed.), The nature of religious language: a colloquium, Continuum International Publishing Group, ISBN 978-1-85075-580-7
- Queen, Edward L.; Prothero, Stephen R.; Shattuck, Gardiner H. (2009), Encyclopedia of American religious history, Infobase Publishing, ISBN 978-0-8160-6660-5
