= Catch the Fire World =

Global non-denominational Charismatic Christian ministry

- Classification: Evangelicalism
- Orientation: Neocharismatic
- Theology: Toronto Blessing
- Leader: Duncan and Kate Smith
- Region: World
- Headquarters: Raleigh, North Carolina, USA
- Founder: Pastors John and Carol Arnott
- Origin: 1994
- Separated from: Vineyard Movement
- Official website: catchthefire.com

Catch the Fire World is a global non-denominational Charismatic Christian ministry that includes churches, music, books, schools and events.

Its flagship church and largest location is Catch the Fire Church in Toronto. This church is the birthplace and center of the Toronto Blessing, a religious revival and phenomenon in charismatic Christianity during the 1990s.

== History ==
Pastors John and Carol Arnott founded the church around 1988. The church later joined John Wimber's Vineyard movement and was known as Toronto Airport Vineyard Church. It met in various rented locations throughout Toronto until the early 1990s when the church found a more permanent home near the Lester B. Pearson Airport.

In January 1994, Randy Clark, a Vineyard pastor, was invited to preach. John Arnott heard that Clark had attended a conference with Rodney Howard-Browne and had been greatly impacted by Howard-Browne's ministry. The revival started during Clark's two-month visit but continued after he left. Some religious leaders criticized the church and revival because of the teachings and manifestations that occurred. Wimber initially defended the Airport Vineyard saying "Nearly everything we've seen—falling, weeping, laughing, shaking—has been seen before, not only in our own memory, but in revivals all over the world."

Nevertheless, the church withdrew or was expelled, according to some, from the Vineyard. Wimber explained the circumstances surrounding the split in a Christianity Today interview, saying that the revival at Toronto was "changing our definition of renewal in Vineyard" and that "[the Vineyard's] decision was to withdraw endorsement; [TACF's] decision was to resign".

After the break with Wimber and the Vineyard in 1995, the church was renamed Toronto Airport Christian Fellowship. It founded Partners in Harvest, a group of churches that shared similar beliefs. In 2006, the Arnotts resigned as senior pastors to pursue a new ministry, Catch the Fire. They were succeeded by Steve and Sandra Long.

The Arnotts now hold the position of Founding Pastors, and the church was renamed in 2010 as Catch the Fire Toronto, to reflect the "fire" of God spreading to other congregations around the world, unifying them.

After more than two decades of hosting revival, John and Carol as Senior Leaders passed on the baton to Duncan and Kate Smith in September 2015.

In 2019, pastors and leaders from both Partners in Harvest and Catch The Fire announced the integration of the two movements. The vision to integrate was that both Partners in Harvest and Catch The Fire will be “stronger together.” This will fulfill their God-given destiny, to invest in leaders, strengthen the local church, and resource missional initiatives.

== Beliefs and Practices ==
TACF Airport Sanctuary

At TACF revival services, worshippers have exhibited unusual behaviours that they attribute to an encounter with God and the presence of the Holy Spirit. The most common described behaviours include laughter (often referred to as "holy laughter"), weeping, deep bowing, shaking, "drunkenness" (a reference to Acts 2:13-15 and Ephesians 5:18), slain in the Spirit and speaking in tongues. Other less common behaviours include producing sounds that resemble animals, such as roaring like lions.

The TACF website described it thus:

The Toronto Blessing is a transferable anointing. In its most visible form it overcomes worshippers with outbreaks of laughter, weeping, groaning, shaking, falling, 'drunkenness,' and even behaviours that have been described as a 'cross between a jungle and a farmyard.'

The church is also the site where the prophecy of the golden sword was given.

The statement of faith of Catch the Fire Church can be found on their main website.

== Music ==
Catch The Fire Music is a collective of worship artists and worship leaders affiliated with Catch The Fire. They have produced several live albums recorded at conferences.
