= Breschi =

Breschi is an Italian surname. Notable people with the surname include:

- Antonio Breschi (born 1950), Italian composer, pianist and trumpet player, singer, writer, poet, and music educator
- Arrigo Breschi, Italian set decorator
- Karen Breschi

== See also ==
- Bruschi
