= Toronto Blessing =

Christian revival movement

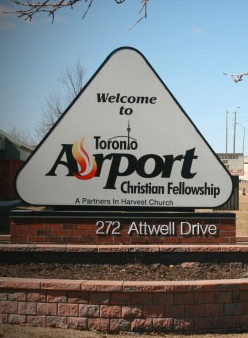
- Site of the Toronto Blessing
- Date: January 20, 1994
- Duration: Continuous
- Location: Toronto, Ontario, Canada

The Toronto Blessing, a term coined by British newspapers, refers to the Christian revival and associated phenomena that began in January 1994 at the Toronto Airport Vineyard church (TAV), which was renamed in 1996 to Toronto Airport Christian Fellowship (TACF) and then later in 2010 renamed to Catch the Fire Toronto. It is categorized as a neo-charismatic Evangelical Christian church and is located in Toronto, Ontario, Canada. The revival impacted charismatic Christian culture through an increase in popularity and international reach and intensified criticism and denominational disputes. Criticism primarily centered around disagreements about charismatic doctrine, the Latter Rain Movement, and whether or not the physical manifestations people experienced were in line with biblical doctrine or were actually heretical practices.

The Toronto Blessing is also reported as having influenced the Brownsville Revival (1995 – c. 2000) and the Lakeland Revival (2008) that occurred later in Florida, and which included similar styles of worship, ministry and reputed supernatural manifestations.

== Characteristics ==
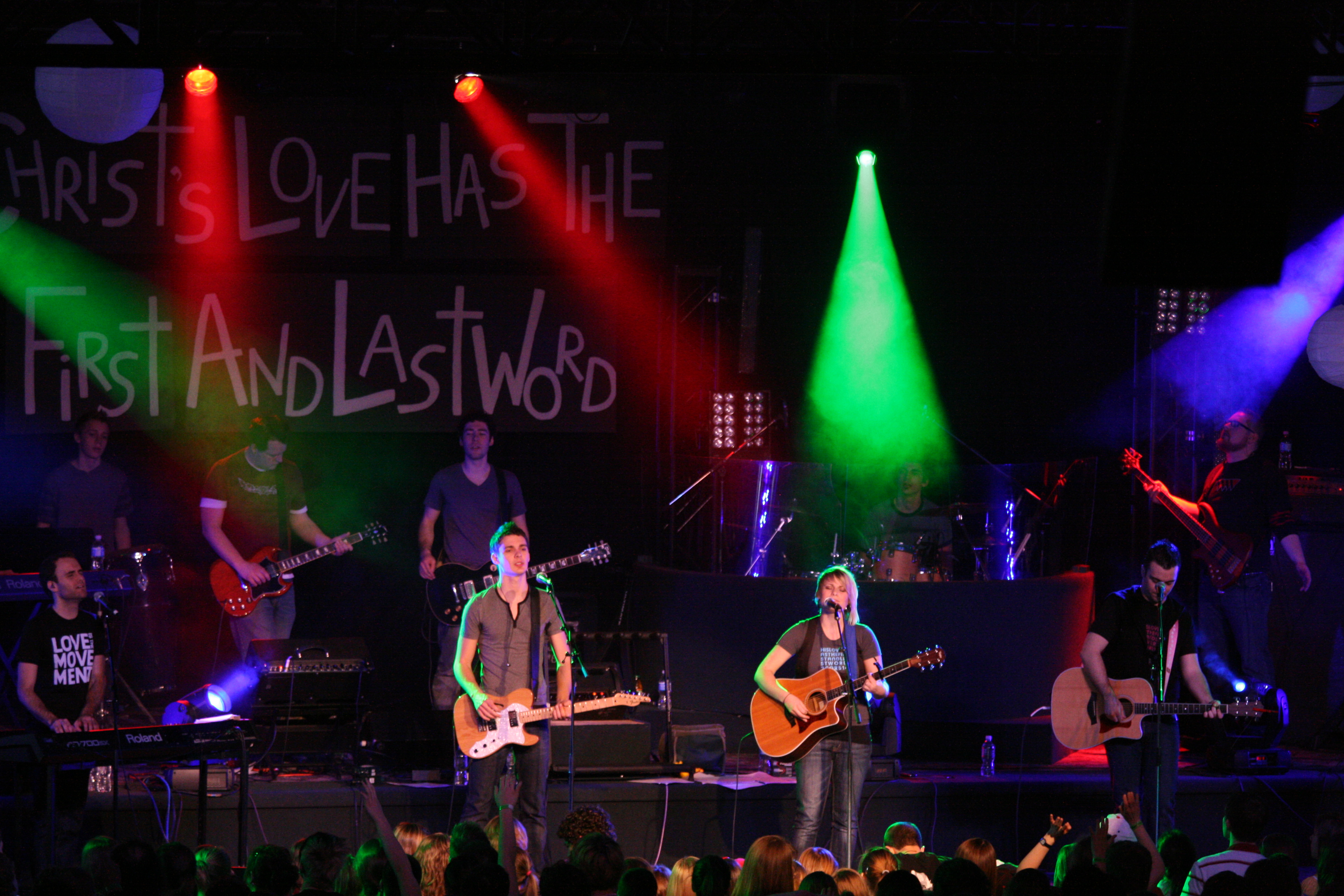
Freshwind band leading worship at Toronto Airport Christian Fellowship in 2008

The Toronto Blessing has become synonymous within charismatic Christian circles for terms and actions that include an increased awareness of God's love, religious ecstasy, external observances of ecstatic worship, being slain in the Spirit, uncontrollable laughter, emotional and/or physical euphoria, crying, healing from emotional wounds, healing of damaged relationships, and electric waves of the spirit. "Holy laughter", as a result of overwhelming joy, was a hallmark manifestation, and there were also some reports of instances of participants roaring like lions or making other animal noises. Leaders and participants present in these services claim that most of these manifestations, including some people roaring like lions, were physical manifestations of the Holy Spirit's presence and power, while some Pentecostal and charismatic leaders believe these were the counterfeits of the Spirit as is mentioned in the biblical passage of 2 Thessalonians 2:9. In December, 1994, Toronto Life Magazine declared TAV as Toronto's most notable tourist attraction for the year.

The events that occurred at the Toronto Blessing are not unique in Christian history; similar events were recorded as happening within the Azusa Street revival of the early 1900s as well as in other revival movements throughout the history of Christian church movements. The Bible also records supernatural events when people encountered God and describes lightning coming from the top of Mount Sinai in Exodus 20:18 when the 10 Commandments were given, Jewish soldiers and temple police falling down in the Garden of Gethsemane when encountering Jesus in John 18:6, Moses' face shining when descending Mount Sinai in Exodus 34:35, and a cloud of glory that appeared over the Hebrew tent of meeting in Exodus 40:34. Proponents of the Toronto Blessing point to these biblical examples as partial evidence of the activities in their meetings being legitimate.

The primary speaker at these meetings for the first few months was Randy Clark, a former Baptist pastor who left his denomination and joined the Association of Vineyard Churches after a team from the Vineyard denomination ministered in his church in 1984. Clark testified to being miraculously healed after a bad car accident while a teenager many years earlier. This event made him believe in supernatural healing, even though at the time he was part of a denomination that believed the gifts of the Spirit were no longer part of the way God operates in the lives of Christians.

=== Miracles and manifestations ===
A common element described by those in attendance at the meetings was the claim of miraculous events that occurred during the services. Some of these could be categorized as physical healings, while in other instances, people reported they had a new awareness of God's love, a new freedom from past fears, anger, and relationship problems. There were even claims of God putting gold fillings into people's teeth during the service. Some of the more common claims include the following:

- More than 300 of the visitors claimed that they supernaturally received gold or silver fillings in their teeth during the meetings.
- A study was conducted in 1995 that surveyed 1,000 people who visited TAV and approximately half of them reported that they felt spiritually refreshed after the meetings, close to 90% said they were "more in love with Jesus" than they had been in any other point in their lives, and 88% of married respondents stated that they were also more in love with their spouse. A follow-up study conducted in 1997 also yielded similar figures from the original survey respondents.

=== Similarities to other revival movements ===
The Toronto Blessing appears to share similarities with other past events where historical records report similar activities of laughter, crying, falling down, shaking and claims of miraculous healings. According to some, these events have been recorded as occurring throughout, not only the recent past, but for the approximate 2,000 years since the crucifixion and resurrection of Christ took place.

Some of the events in the past few hundred years that bear these similarities include, but are not limited to, the following:

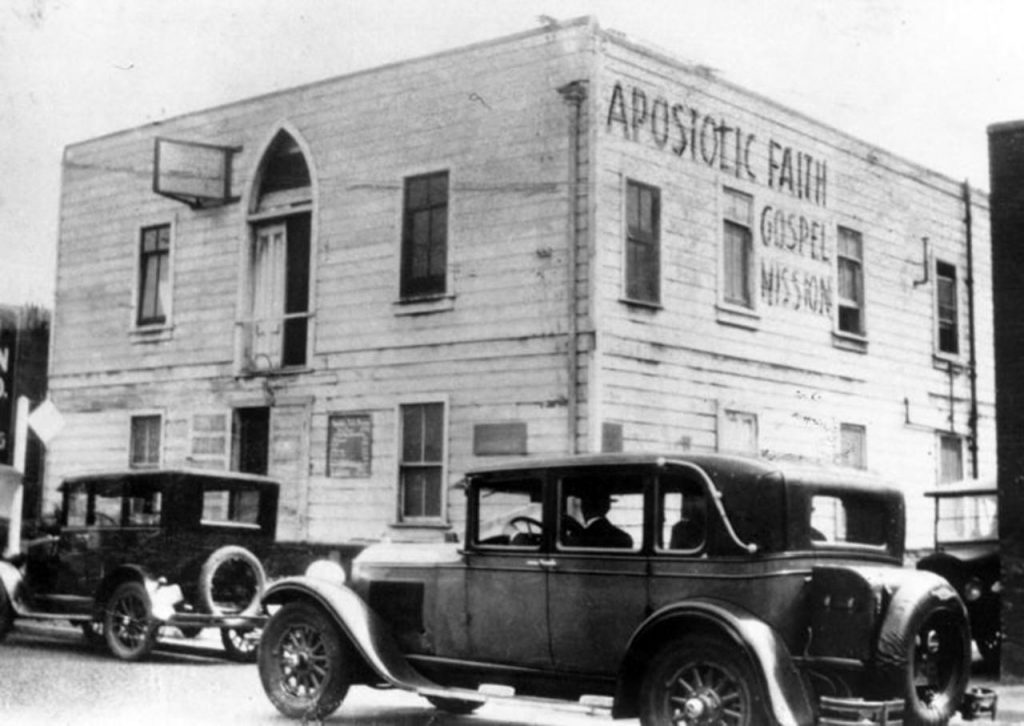
Azusa Street revival location

- Lakeland Revival
- Brownsville Revival
- Holiness Pentecostal Revivals in 1875-1907
- Welsh Revival
- Jotebeche Methodist Church Revival
- Azusa Street Revival
- Cane Ridge Revival
- Second Great Awakening led by Charles Finney

== Reaction and criticism ==
Some Christian leaders were enthusiastic about what they saw as a renewal in North American Christianity, while others saw it as heretical and spiritually dangerous. The laughter portion of these meetings was endorsed by Benny Hinn, Oral Roberts and Pat Robertson, who said in one interview that "The Bible says in the presence of the Lord there is fullness of joy."

Critics referred to it as self-centered and evil and claimed that the strange manifestations were warning signs for other Christian believers to stay away. Others defended the blessing as historically rooted in earlier revivals, such as those seen by pastor and theologian Jonathan Edwards, and as having positive effects in the lives of participants.

In his book, Counterfeit Revival, Hank Hanegraaff claimed that the revival has done more damage than good and that the Toronto blessing was a matter of people being enslaved into altered states of consciousness where they obscure reality and enshrine absurdity. Hank Hanegraaff also stated in a 1996 Washington Post interview that, "It's nice to feel all these things, but the fact is, these feelings will wear off, and then disappointment steps in. I call it post-Holy Laughter depression syndrome."

At the time of the renewal, B. J. Oropeza, then a researcher for the Christian Research Institute, compared phenomena from the Toronto meetings with phenomena from previous Western revivals. He concluded that while authentic signs of revival might be present at such meetings, ministerial leaders have a biblical responsibility to ensure that parishioners maintain orderly conduct at the gatherings and this seemed to be lacking at many of the meetings.

James Beverley, a critic of the Toronto Blessing and a professor at Toronto-based Tyndale Seminary, stated that these events were a "mixed blessing", but was later quoted in 2014 as saying, "whatever the weaknesses are, they are more than compensated for by thousands and thousands of people having had tremendous encounters with God, receiving inner healings, and being renewed." He also stated, "My concerns have changed a bit. I regret saying that they did not give enough attention to Jesus. I think that was too hard. The leaders and the people, they love Jesus. We all do not give enough attention to Jesus."

It is also important to note that other Vineyard churches, such as Harvest Rock in Pasadena, California experienced the same manifestations as those that occurred at TAV around the same time as the events of 1994.

== Timeline of immediate and subsequently impacted events ==
1994: The Toronto Blessing began at the Toronto Airport Vineyard church, when pastors John and Carol Arnott were reportedly inspired by revivals in South Africa as well as those in Argentina that were led by Claudio Freidzon. They invited Randy Clark, a Vineyard pastor from St. Louis, Missouri, to minister at the church from January 20–23, 1994. Randy Clark had been influenced by his own personal life experiences of miracles happening in the church he pastored, as well as the ministry of Rodney Howard-Browne, a South African preacher, and founder of the Rodney Howard-Browne Evangelistic Association in Louisville, Kentucky. Clark preached at TAV church over the course of 60 days, starting January 20, and the meetings continued for 6 days each week for the next 12 1/2 years. He spent 42 of those first 60 days in Canada with a few in-between trips back home to see his family.

In that first revival service, there were about 120 people in attendance, and Arnott stated that most members fell on the floor "laughing, rolling, and carrying on". During that first year, the church's regular attendance size reportedly tripled to 1,000 members, and meetings were held every night except on Mondays, as the revival's influence continued to spread. Reports of similar revivals emerged from Atlanta, Anaheim, and St. Louis in the United States, and from Cambodia, and Albania. It became common for visitors to carry the influence of the revival back to their home congregations where the revival would then continue within their own churches; two notable British cases in point were Holy Trinity, Brompton and Holy Trinity, Cheltenham. Other worldwide locations that became known for a Toronto Blessing style of revival include Pensacola, Florida, home of the Brownsville Revival, Bath, England, Cagayan de Oro, Philippines, and Abilene, Texas. A few months later, in May 1994, Eleanor Mumford, the wife of a Vineyard pastor who herself had attended the services at TAV, traveled to Holy Trinity Brompton (HTB) in London, England where, after sharing her testimony, manifestations and activities similar to those that occurred at TAV began to also occur at HTB. It was also recorded that members of the Newfrontiers group of churches visited Toronto, and upon their return home, revival began breaking out in their churches.

1995: Charisma Magazine reported that an estimated 4,000 churches in England and another 7,000 churches in North America had been impacted by this new revival movement. During this same year, Steve Hill, an Assemblies of God evangelist, who was recorded as being powerfully impacted when he attended Holy Trinity Brompton, was asked to preach at the Brownsville Assembly of God church in Pensacola, Florida. A handful of staff members of this church had also been to the services in Toronto, and had been praying for revival for several years. The Brownsville Revival started on Father's Day, and as a result, reportedly led to almost a quarter of a million people being converted to Christianity.

2000: The Guardian reported that 250,000 agnostics in the United Kingdom turned to a belief in Jesus through Nicky Gumbel's Alpha course." Nicky Gumbel was also later recorded as being in attendance at some of the Toronto Blessing meetings.

2014: 20-year anniversary conference - A special conference was held at Catch the Fire in January 2014 to commemorate the 20-year anniversary of the original Toronto Blessing. Attendees stated that apologies and forgiveness were offered during this conference that brought about a closing of the rift that formed between the Vineyard and TAV during the earlier times of the movement.

Continual Services - Regular services continue to be held at Catch the Fire, and attendees continue to travel from around the world to visit the church.

The peak of the Toronto Blessing's prominence in the Christian community occurred in the mid- to late-1990s. Since that time it has faded from public view, although the proponents of Discernment Ministries have suggested that these kinds of events are simply part of a wider theological cycle that has existed continually throughout modern era charismatic Movements. Manifestations of the kind associated with the Toronto Blessing were also recorded in Colin Urquhart's earlier book, "When The Spirit Comes," which appeared during the 1970s and chronicled the renewals which occurred at the church in Luton, England where Urquhart was, for a time, incumbent. The phenomena associated with the charismatic renewal have been championed by such clergy as Urquhart and David Watson in Britain, as well as by countless preachers worldwide, but have also been criticized as dehumanizing and as being rooted in extreme aesthetic reactions to religious stimuli.

== Impact on Christian culture ==
The events that started in 1994 spurred many Christians hungry for deeper encounters with God to visit the church in Toronto, or attend other events around the world that were also influenced by what occurred during the Toronto Blessing. Several highly successful missionaries, pastors, and itinerant ministers today attribute the growth of their organizations and their increased hunger for more of God's presence to the Toronto Blessing. These include Bill Johnson, Senior Pastor of Bethel Church in Redding, California, Heidi and Rolland Baker, Missionaries to Mozambique, Africa, and Che Ahn, Senior Pastor of Harvest Rock Church in Pasadena, California. Each of these leaders has also had a major impact on the 21st Century Charismatic Movement through regular conferences and revival meetings, including Azusa Now, Jesus Culture Conferences, The Call and The Send.

=== Positive impact ===
Many different ministers traveled to TAV, and later, Toronto Airport Christian Fellowship (TACF) to experience for themselves what was happening during the Toronto Blessing meetings, as well as in the years to follow. These ministers have stated in various books and public teachings that they were present in the meetings, had differing positive encounters, and reported the fruit of those encounters:

Harvest International Ministries (HIM): started nightly meetings after their pastor, Che Ahn, attended services at TAV. These meetings lasted for three years and, since that time, HIM has planted thousands of churches in over 60 nations.

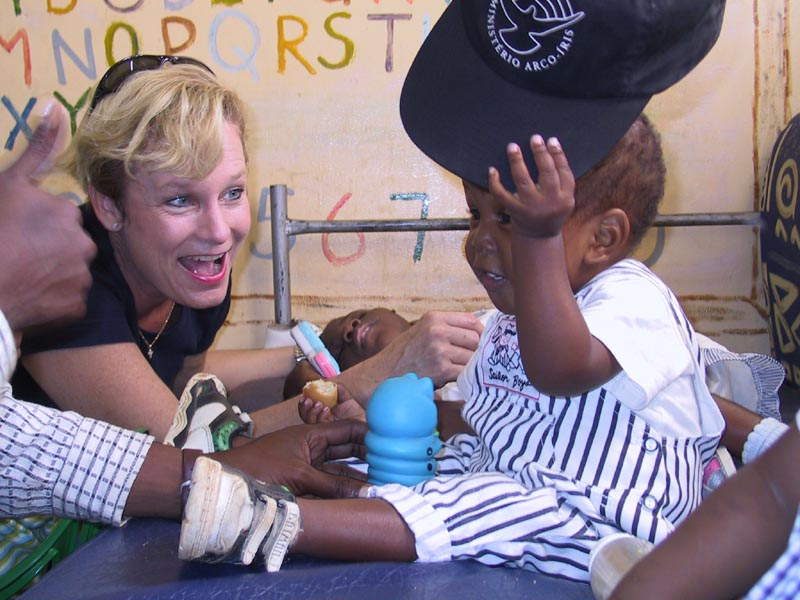
Heidi Baker, leader of IRIS Global

IRIS Global: Heidi Baker, after attending the meetings in Toronto, went back to Mozambique, and in the years since, along with her husband, Rolland Baker, has planted more than 10,000 churches throughout Africa and Asia. Their organization, Iris Global, also provides food for 10,000 children each day, operates three primary schools, and five Bible schools; all of this success is attributed to what started in Toronto.

Bethel Church: One year after Bill Johnson, a pastor in Weaverville, California, visited TAV, he took over as the senior pastor of Bethel Church in Redding, California. Bethel has become known as a place of supernatural healing, impartation, and ministry training as a result of what occurred in Toronto.

Nicky Gumbel: Gumbel was the curate of Holy Trinity Brompton at the time of the Toronto Blessing and was later the vicar of the church, the biggest Anglican church in the United Kingdom. He has been quoted as saying that the Toronto Blessing was "the kick start that the Alpha course needed".

=== Negative impact ===
Alleged origins from outside of the Christian tradition - Andrew Strom claims that the spiritual phenomena witnessed during the Toronto Blessing were a result of what is known in the Hindu kundalini yoga tradition as shaktipat and "kundalini awakening". He makes these claims in reference to phenomena that occurred during the Toronto Blessing such as shaking, jerking, and writhing on the floor.

The claims of Strom have been directly disputed in a formal response by Randy Clark as well as in a book written by John Arnott with his explanation of the disputed events. Phenomena associated with "kundalini awakening" and the practice of shaktipat have appeared by those within the Toronto Blessing Movement to be similar to phenomena and/or spiritual practices mentioned in various New Testament texts, such as Acts 2:1-13, albeit under different names, in different terms, or with different purposes. For example, based on the testimony and specific evidence provided in Acts 2:1-13, what the Hindu spiritual traditions refer to as a "kundalini awakening" have been considered to carry a similarity to what occurred to Jesus' 12 Apostles - en masse - during the original Pentecost event. The Apostles' "baptism of the Holy Spirit" during Pentecost was accompanied by manifestations of "tongues of fire" and of speaking in other languages, which some present could understand, but others considered to be babbling in drunkenness. The accusation of drunkenness has been interpreted by practitioners of the Toronto Blessing to be actual drunken behavior. They believe that Andrew Strom has mistakenly confused manifestations within their movement to manifestations that occur within the New Age practice of Kundalini awakening. There continues to be a debate around whether or not such manifestations reflect what occurred within the biblical text of Acts 2:1-13.

Theological disagreement and reputation - Some organizations and writers have painted the Toronto Blessing in a negative light which has created a negative stigma or reputation regarding charismatic style services among other Christian denominations. Other theologians singled out TAV, and its associated leaders, John and Caroll Arnott, as part of a bigger criticism of the Charismatic Movement, arguing from the position that the gifts of the Spirit have ceased. One major voice in this dissent was John F. MacArthur who, in October 2013, led the "Strange Fire" Conference which was aimed at exposing excesses and doctrinal errors in the charismatic Christian movement. Pastor Alan Morrison is also quoted as referring to the Toronto Blessing as the "Toronto delusion" and a "plague on the land."

Denominational splits - In December 1995, the Toronto Airport Vineyard church was released from affiliation with the Vineyard movement. The reasons for the disaffiliation were for growing tension over the church's emphasis on extraordinary manifestations of the Holy Spirit, the methods used to logistically manage the ministry time during the services, a concern about leaders not abiding by established Association of Vineyard Churches guidelines, and the Vineyard leadership's inability to exercise oversight over the revival. Early in 1996, the leadership of TAV decided to rename the church to Toronto Airport Christian Fellowship. Randy Clark later stated that he was "grieved by the decision of the Vineyard's leadership" regarding this matter. Bethel Church, located in Redding, California, and other organizations also later detached themselves from the Assemblies of God to support their own spiritual practices and movements that had occurred during the revival meetings.

== See also ==
- 2023 Asbury revival
- Brownsville Revival, Pensacola, Florida, 1995-2000
- Catch the Fire Toronto, Canada, 1994
- Holy Roller
- New Apostolic Reformation
- Religious ecstasy
