= The Woven Whisper =

Studio album by Sarah Brusco
- Released: August 13, 2014
- Genres: CCM, folk, worship
- Length: 57:08
- Label: Vineyard/Sarah Brusco
- Producers: Eben Brusco, Bob Spangler

The Woven Whisper is the first studio album by Sarah Brusco. Brusco alongside Vineyard released the album on August 13, 2014. Brusco worked with her husband, Eben Brusco, and Bob Spangler, in the production of this album.

== Background ==
This album was funded through a crowdfunding campaign project on Kickstarter. The album's title came from a tapestry she inherited from her grandmother-in-law that was made by her sister, Marie Kelly, and it's now hung in the couples living room.

== Critical reception ==
Professional ratings
Review scores
Source	Rating
CCM Magazine	3/5 stars
Christian Review Magazine	4/5 stars
Cross Rhythms	8/10 squares
Indie Vision Music	4/5 stars
Worship Leader	4/5 stars

Awarding the album three stars from CCM Magazine, Grace Aspinwall states, "it is inspiring." Tony Cummings, giving the album an eight out of ten review for Cross Rhythms, writes, "Atmospheric is a word often used by hard-pressed reviewers but no other word better fits this soothing balm of an album." Rating the album four stars by Indie Vision Music, Shawn Harvey says, "we can’t help but be reminded of how soothing and powerful that type of worship can be." Christian St. John, writing a four star review at Christian Review Magazine, describes, it is "an alternative worship album".

== Track listing ==
track listing
No.	Title	Writer(s)	Length
1.	"A Breath"	Sarah Brusco, Dallas Steiden	2:22
2.	"Leading Me On"	Eben Brusco, Jeremy Harion, Savage Spirit	9:18
3.	"Carry Me"	S. Brusco, Steiden	3:29
4.	"At the Table"	E. Brusco, S. Brusco	3:54
5.	"The Wood Between the Worlds"	S. Brusco, Steiden	5:05
6.	"Your Faithful Voice"	E. Brusco, S. Brusco, Savage Spirit	6:07
7.	"At Peace"	E. Brusco, S. Brusco, Steve Carpenter	3:48
8.	"Make Your Home Inside My Heart"	E. Brusco, Casey Corum	6:55
9.	"The Woven Whisper"	S. Brusco, Savage Spirit	7:35
10.	"Exalt the Lord"	Cindy Rethmeier, Savage Spirit	8:35
Total length:			57:08
