= Zabawski =

Zabawski (feminine:Zabawska) is a Polish noble surname of Zabawa coat of arms. Russian-language versions of the surname are Zabavsky / Zabavskaya.

Notable people with the surname include:

- Daria Zabawska (born 1995), Polish discus thrower
- Krystyna Zabawska (born 1968), Polish shot putter
- Przemysław Zabawski (born 1975), Polish shot putter
- Sergey Zabavsky (born 1974), Tajik long-distance runner
