= Rodney Howard-Browne =

South African preacher (born 1961)

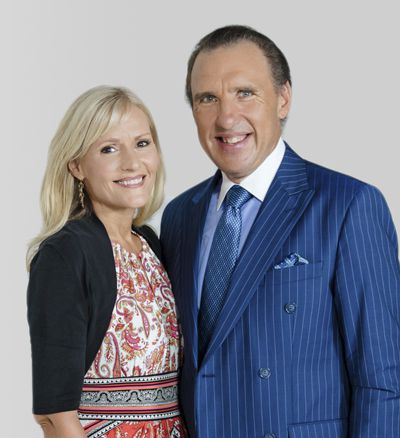
- Howard-Browne and his wife, Adonica in 2022
- Born: Rodney Morgan Howard Browne; June 12, 1961 (age 65); Port Elizabeth, South Africa
- Spouse: Adonica Weyers (m. 1989)
- Website: Revival Ministries International

Rodney Morgan Howard-Browne (born June 12, 1961) is a South African-born American evangelist and a conspiracy theorist. He has resided in Tampa, Florida since the mid-1990s and is pastor of The River Church in Tampa Bay. The River is a Pentecostal church with revival meetings, led by Howard-Browne, known for those in the audience breaking into "holy laughter" and experiencing other Pentecostal and charismatic phenomena. Howard-Browne is the head of Revival Ministries International, a ministry he and his wife founded in 1997.

== Biography ==
Howard-Browne and his three brothers (Mervyn, Bazil, and Gil) were raised in a Pentecostal family in the cities of Port Elizabeth and East London, South Africa. His father, Frank Mervyn Derric Howard-Browne (1924–2005), was a cleric. Howard-Browne became a Christian at age five. In 1981, he met and married his wife Adonica (née Weyers). In the 1980s, he volunteered to work for Youth for Christ before doing a teaching stint with Rhema Bible School in Johannesburg.

In December 1988, the family emigrated from South Africa to the United States, Howard-Browne opened his first U.S. church in Clifton Park, New York, in April 1989. In 1991, he moved to Louisville, Kentucky where he began holding revival meetings. The Rodney Howard-Browne Evangelistic Association was incorporated in November 1993 and the family moved to the Tampa Bay, Florida area in 1994. Rodney's eldest brother Gil went on to operate Times of Refreshing Ministries, an online evangelical ministry. Likewise, his youngest brother Bazil established an eponymous evangelical ministry on 1 January 1994 with the professed aim of people achieving financial freedom through the special anointing of God. Prior to this he had worked alongside his brother Rodney for a year.

In 1996, Howard-Browne founded a church he named "The River" at Tampa Bay Church in Tampa, Florida, serving as its pastor ever since. Howard-Browne and his wife also founded Revival Ministries International in 1997, as well as River Bible Institute and River School of Worship.

Howard-Browne's services are characterized by laying on of hands with worshipers giggling in apparent spiritual drunkenness, speaking in tongues, breaking into uncontrollable holy laughter, shaking, dancing in the aisles, or falling to the ground. He refers to himself as "God's bartender" and the "holy ghost bartender".

Howard-Browne is credited with introducing holy laughter to Carpenter's Home Church in Lakeland, Florida during a series of revival services with Karl Strader in 1993. The holy laughter revivals later spread to nearby churches in Melbourne, Titusville, Stuart and Vero Beach, Florida. Howard-Browne is credited with bringing holy laughter to the charismatic Toronto Airport Vineyard Church (soon after expelled by its parent Vineyard Church) at a 1994 revival in Toronto, Canada with evangelist Randy Clark, known as the "Toronto Blessing," and then a year later, to Assemblies of God (AOG) Brownsville Church in Pensacola, Florida with evangelist Steve Hill. The event became known in Christian circles as the Brownsville Revival. Howard-Browne also ministered under pastor Mike Rose at the Juneau Christian Center (formerly known as the Bethel Assembly of God) in Juneau, Alaska, an AOG church that Sarah Palin later attended after becoming governor of Alaska.

Howard-Browne first came to national prominence in the US in 1999 when his Revival Ministries organization rented Madison Square Garden in New York City for six weeks. The event, called Good News New York, was described as "an effort to achieve a Billy Graham-style faith uprising", but was "derided in local media as a giant flop". It was estimated to cost up to $10 million but only 3,000 people were counted in attendance at the 19,000-seat arena. Investigative journalists in his home town of Tampa reported at the time that since arriving from South Africa almost penniless in December 1989, his sudden wealth included a boat, a Harley Davidson motorcycle, a home in one of Tampa's exclusive gated communities and access to a private jet; however, they were unable to find evidence of financial wrongdoing.

Howard-Browne's daughter Kelly died of cystic fibrosis on Christmas Day 2002, at the age of 18. He then vowed "to win 100 million souls to Jesus and to put $1 billion into world missions".

In 2012, it was reported that Howard-Browne's River Church had hosted political meetings for the Florida chapter of the Republican Party during the preceding two years, including a rally for then presidential candidate Newt Gingrich, at which Howard-Browne called for a national "rising" of Christian Americans "that will not sit idly by and allow the killing of unborn babies and allow Islam to take over this country". At the same event, he described Mormonism as a "cult" that, in the 19th century, "had death squads that would go around killing everybody that was not a Mormon". He later recanted, saying Mormons were "honourable people".

Howard-Browne published The Killing of Uncle Sam: The Demise of the United States of America, which was scheduled to be released in May 2018, and announced that proceeds from sales of the book would go to the River School of Government, a degree granting program, operated by Howard-Browne and his wife under the auspices of Revival Ministries, that funds training for people seeking to run for political office.

Howard-Browne's evangelical movement has been described as "a combination of brimstone and fire about God's power, sprinkled with hipster references and a conviction that church—like Disneyland—should be 'the happiest place on earth'." "Yet Howard-Browne is also widely credited with having one of the most racially and economically diverse congregations in Florida. It feeds hundreds of poor Tampa families weekly and at his televised Sunday services dishes out huge checks to members facing financial crises." In 1999, The Tampa Tribune reported that critics of his high-profile revival meetings described him as "a manipulator leading followers into a cult; a circus ring leader making a good living." On the other hand B.J. Oropeza concludes in his book A Time to Laugh (reviewed by Lloyd K. Pietersen, University of Sheffield and also by "The Pneuma Review. Journal of Ministry Resources and Theology for Pentecostal and Charismatic Ministries & Leaders" which stated that it is "well-documented and well-researched book") that he is not 'a mass-hypnotist, charlatan or a cultist'. Oropeza further states about Howard-Browne that "Having read RHB's writings on financial stewardship and prosperity, I have concluded that he does not believe in a prosperity that promotes greed, materialism, or using God as a means to get rich. He denounces ministers who fleece the church through clever gimmicks."

The New International Dictionary of Pentecostal Charismatic Movements compares Howard-Browne meetings to great revivals under Whitefield, Wesley, and Finney.

In the Special Centennial Edition of The Azusa Street Revival, The Holy Spirit in America, 100 Years, the revival meetings conducted by Howard-Browne are compared to the Azusa Street Revival.

== Statements and controversies ==
=== Diploma mill doctorate ===
Howard-Browne claimed to have earned a "doctorate of ministry degree" in 1992 from "The School of Bible Theology", a non-accredited Pentecostal correspondence school in San Jacinto, California that has been described as a "diploma mill".

=== Multi-level marketing: Monavie and Jeunesse ===
Howard-Browne and his wife Adonica were top-ranking ("Black Diamond executive level") distributors for Monavie, a multi-level marketing company that sold acai berry juice-based beverages until folding in 2014 subsequent to a $182 million loan default and allegations of pyramid scheming, fraudulent advertising, and patent infringement. As of 2016, Howard-Browne also served as a "North America Emerald Director" for the multi-level marketing company Jeunesse.

=== Allegation of plot to attack Donald Trump ===
In July 2017, Howard-Browne was one of 17 evangelical pastors who visited the White House to pray for and lay hands on President Donald Trump. In a video several days later, Howard-Browne stated that "there is a planned attack on our president and that's all I can tell you about right now; I know what I'm talking about, I've spoken to high-ranking people in the government". Howard-Browne later said that the Secret Service met with him to discover which congressman told him about the plot but he refused to say, citing pastoral privilege. Howard-Browne praised God for giving America a 'Rambo'.

In March 2016, Howard-Browne wrote a Facebook post titled "Donald Trump Is the New World Order's Worst Nightmare," where he detailed his choice to back Trump in the election as a check against a global conspiracy to destroy America.

=== Hurricane Irma ===
In September 2017, Howard-Browne received media attention after referring to Hurricane Irma—a category 4 storm that caused the death of fifty people in the United States and Caribbean and resulted in power outages affecting 5.5 million people in Florida—as a "nothingburger". He further stated that "prayer took the teeth out of the storm".

=== Alleging human sacrifice ===
In an October 2017 sermon at The River at Tampa Bay church, Howard-Browne alleged that "They sacrifice children at the highest levels in Hollywood. They drink blood of young kids. This is a fact", continuing, "The human sacrifice and the cannibalism has been going on for years" in Hollywood and Washington, D.C.

=== Arming of the River at Tampa Bay church ===
Howard-Browne drew attention for a social media post in November 2017, two days after the Sutherland Springs church shooting, stating that his church was not a gun-free zone and that he and the church's pastors "are all heavily armed" and would use "deadly force".

=== Conspiracy theories on InfoWars ===
In March 2018, Howard-Browne made an appearance on Alex Jones' InfoWars program during which he claimed: that a string of bombings in Austin, Texas were being used by "anarchist terrorists" in an attempt to bring "everything under control"; that churches and religious groups were being censored in the U.S.; and that "globalist gremlins" were attempting to thwart Donald Trump.

=== Christchurch Mosque shootings ===
Shortly after the Christchurch mosque shootings in March 2019, Howard-Browne tweeted his opinion that it was a 'false flag' operation: "There is no doubt that what happened in New Zealand as horrific as it is, is a false flag that will be blamed on conservatives when it's all said and done! Only a total nutjob lunatic, insane demonized freak goes into a building and kills people, it's unacceptable on every level!"

=== Iqaluit sermon ===
On August 27, 2019, Howard-Browne delivered a sermon in the Canadian Arctic territory of Nunavut as part of a 300-city tour. He preached for over an hour at an Iqaluit church to a mostly Inuit audience of more than 100 people. The event featured a call for donations, including a video of Howard-Browne claiming "God loves a generous giver," which Nunatsiaq News criticized on the basis that poverty is widespread in the city and nearly half of Nunavut's population relies on social assistance amidst long-standing crises in food security and housing. The news outlet also noted that he "lashed out" at and "harangued" audience members who tried to leave before the end of the sermon. Commenting after the event, Anglican bishop for the Arctic, David Parsons, described Howard-Browne as an extremist.

=== Coronavirus pandemic ===
Howard-Browne kept his church open during the COVID-19 pandemic and on March 15, 2020, he told his congregants to continue shaking hands because they were "revivalists, not pansies". He dedicated most of the sermon to mocking fears about the spread of the coronavirus and calling it a "phantom plague" designed to shut down churches and terrify people into receiving a vaccine that would cause mass deaths as a population control scheme, which he claimed was part of a plan laid out in a 2010 document "Scenarios for the Future of Technology and International Development" produced by The Rockefeller Foundation and Global Business Network. Several weeks prior, Howard-Browne claimed in a video that he would cure Florida of coronavirus, and in a 2019 video he had falsely claimed that he and other worshipers at his church had cleansed Florida of Zika virus.

On March 29, 2020, Howard-Browne's congregation received a visit from the Hillsborough County Sheriff's Office warning about his violations of the county's safer-at-home order, which limited public gatherings to 10 people. The next day, Hillsborough County Sheriff Chad Chronister announced that he had issued an arrest warrant for unlawful assembly and for violating rules regarding public health emergencies after Howard-Browne continued to hold large church services in defiance of the public order. Chronister said he had no choice but to take action against Howard-Browne, stating "His reckless disregard for human life put hundreds of people from his congregation at risk and thousands of residents who may interact with them this week."

On March 30, 2020, Howard-Browne was arrested and jailed for unlawful assembly and for violating health and safety rules, with each charge carrying a maximum penalty of 60 days in jail and a $500 fine. He was released from jail after posting a $500 bond. On April 1, Howard-Browne said that he would not open his church the following weekend over fear of his congregation's safety and to protect them from "government tyranny." However, his lawyer, Mathew Staver of the law firm Liberty Counsel, said that Howard-Browne's arrest earlier in the week had led to the pastor's insurance policy being cancelled. Howard-Browne also claimed that he had received death threats. The pastor held open the possibility that the church would be open for Easter services but then announced on April 9 that it would instead be closed. Prosecutors dropped the charges on May 15, deeming that Howard-Browne posed no ongoing risk to public health after he took steps to maintain responsible social distancing at the church. Starting in May 2020, he reopened the church as TheStand20.
