= Slain in the Spirit =

Form of prostration in Pentecostal Christianity

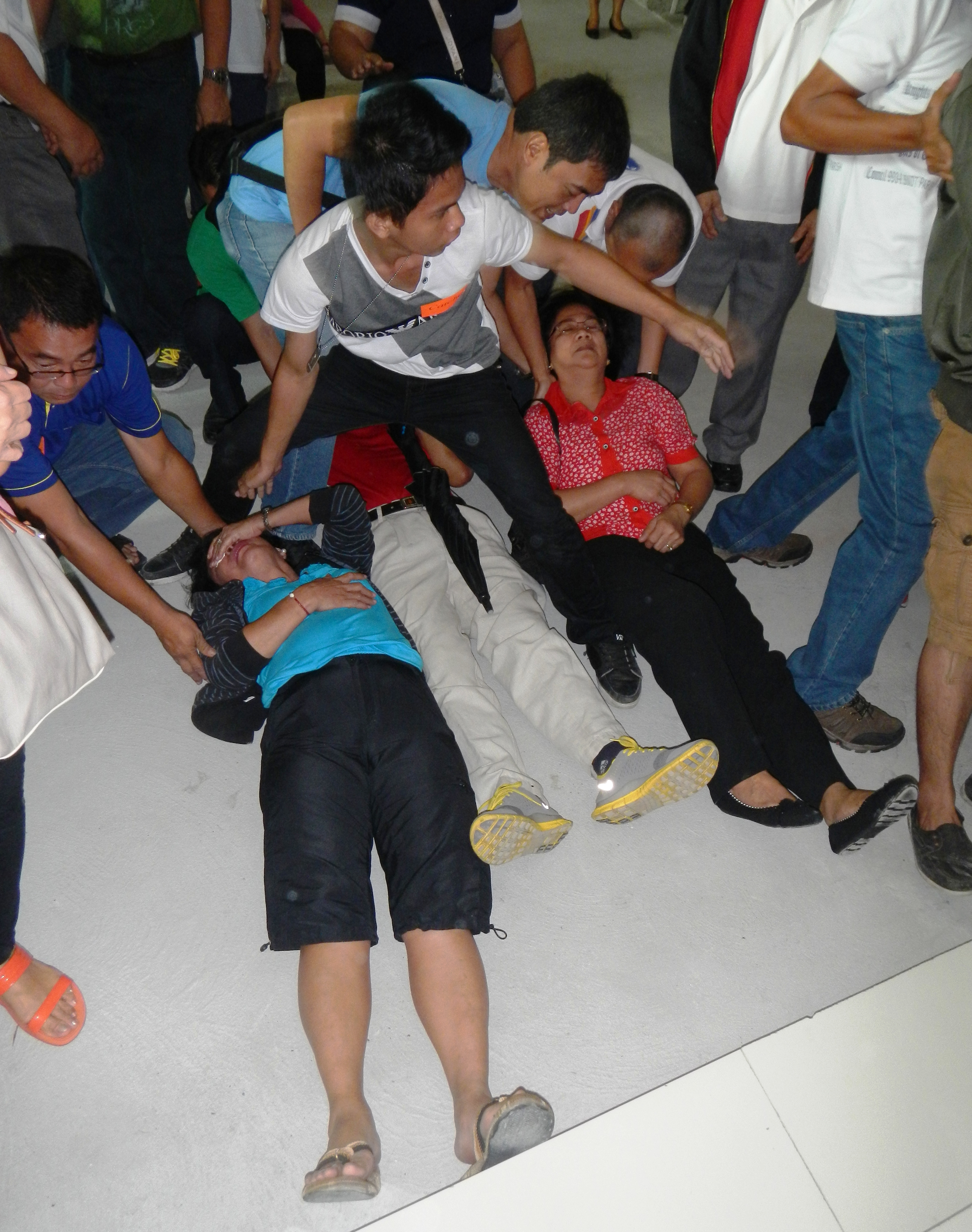
People slain in the Spirit after receiving prayer from faith healer and Catholic priest Fernando Suarez

Slain in the Spirit or slaying in the Spirit are terms used by Pentecostal and charismatic Christians to describe a form of prostration in which an individual falls to the floor while experiencing religious ecstasy. Believers attribute this behavior to the power of the Holy Spirit. Other terms used to describe the experience include falling under the power, overcome by the Spirit, and resting in the Spirit. The practice is associated with faith healing because individuals are often slain while seeking prayer for illness.

== Description ==
Sociologist Margaret Poloma has defined slaying in the Spirit as "the power of the Holy Spirit so filling a person with a heightened inner awareness that the body's energy fades away and the person collapses to the floor". Slaying in the Spirit may occur in a variety of settings, including while a person prays in solitude. However, it usually occurs in group settings, including small prayer groups, religious conferences or retreats, regular church services and large healing crusades.

In church services or healing crusades, attendees may be invited to the front of the church or other venue to receive prayer from a minister or a team of ministers. Often, the prayer is accompanied with the laying on of hands and anointing with oil. Those being prayed for perceive the Spirit of God upon them and they fall, usually onto their backs. In most cases, their fall is broken by ushers or "catchers". Once fallen, a person may lie on the floor face up and eyes closed for several seconds to several hours in some cases.

People who have experienced the phenomenon report different degrees of awareness ranging from total consciousness to complete unconsciousness. They also report feelings of peace and relaxation. While lying down, they may speak in tongues, laugh, weep or speak praises to God. According to anthropologist Thomas Csordas:

In Charismatic ritual life, resting in the Spirit can serve the purposes of demonstrating divine power; of exhibiting the faith of those who are "open" to such power; of allowing a person to be close to, "touched by," or "spoken to" by God (sometimes via embodied imagery); of preparing a person to receive and exercise a spiritual gift; or of healing.

Not all incidents of falling or swooning in Pentecostal and charismatic churches are attributed to the Holy Spirit. Besides the possibility of fraud, charismatics may also attribute the behavior to demonic activity. Analyzing accounts of early Pentecostal religious ecstasy, historian Grant Wacker concluded that communal cues helped religious communities determine whether specific incidents were instigated by the Holy Spirit or not. Other explanations of the phenomenon have also been proposed, such as autosuggestion, peer pressure, or a desire to experience what others have experienced. In addition, sociologists note that similar phenomena, such as spirit possession and trance, can be found in other religions.

Joe Nickell, writing in the Skeptical Inquirer, observed the use of slaying in the Spirit during a Benny Hinn healing crusade in 2001. He compared the practice to hypnosis, writing that participants "merely engage in a form of role-playing that is prompted by their strong desire to receive divine power as well as by the influence of suggestion that they do so [...] In short, they behave just as if 'hypnotized.'" According to Nickell, a professional hypnotist stated that "This is something we do every day".

== History ==
Beginning with the First Great Awakening that impacted Protestant Europe as well as Britain's American colonies in the eighteenth century, bodily movements became a prominent and controversial part of Protestant revivalism. Supporters of the revivals within various denominations including Presbyterians, Congregationalists, Baptists and Methodists argued that trembling, groaning, screaming and falling to the ground "as dead" were signs of divine power in those who were becoming aware of their own sinfulness. This bodily agitation, as well as the problem of sin and guilt, was resolved through a conscious conversion experience, which was marked by peace and joy.

John Wesley, the founder of Methodism, considered falling down and other bodily movements to be natural (not supernatural) human responses to the supernatural "testimony" or "witness" of the Holy Spirit in conversion. Occasionally, Wesley attributed bodily movements to Satan's attempt at disrupting the conversion process, but at other times, he described bodily movements as natural human responses to God's love. Wesley, George Whitefield and Jonathan Edwards all record instances of people falling during their ministries. During the Second Great Awakening of the early nineteenth century, Peter Cartwright and Charles G. Finney also recorded similar behavior.

In the twentieth century, "prostrate trance" became chiefly associated with Pentecostalism and its offshoots. The term "slain in the Spirit" was used in this context as early as 1920 by American healing evangelist Maria Woodworth-Etter, whose ministry was often accompanied by this phenomenon. In her book The Holy Spirit, published in 1920, she wrote:

"It will come to pass in the last days," says the Lord, "that I will plead with all flesh, with the sword and fire, 'and the slain of the Lord shall be many.'" (See Isaiah 66:16.) The sword is the Word of God. The fire is the Holy Spirit. The slain of the Lord are those who fall under conviction or who fall like dead men under the power of God.

Historian Grant Wacker argues that early Pentecostals replaced the liturgies and sacraments of traditional churches with the "disciplined use of ecstasy", including the regular occurrence of slaying in the Spirit. Regarding the sacramental undertones of slaying in the Spirit, Wacker writes:

In those situations Christ's physical death and resurrection was re-embodied—not just reenacted but literally re-embodied—night after night, before the very eyes of believers and nonbelievers alike. In one account after another we read that prostrate worshipers covered the floor. The stories sometimes stated and often implied that no one was left standing, which suggests that prostration gained a ritualistic significance comparable, perhaps, to kneeling or genuflecting in liturgical church traditions.

The frequency of slaying in the Spirit and the importance that Pentecostals placed on it decreased over time as Pentecostals attempted to shed the stereotype of being "Holy Rollers" (a derogatory term derived from instances of people literally rolling in the aisles when baptized in the Holy Spirit). In 1989, Margaret Poloma noted that some pastors and even high ranking leaders within the Assemblies of God USA, a Pentecostal denomination, were critical of the practice.

Slaying in the Spirit saw a resurgence during the 1960s and 1970s due to the influence of the charismatic movement, which disseminated Pentecostal beliefs and practices among mainline Protestants and Roman Catholics. During the 1980s, it experienced another surge in visibility due to the influence of John Wimber, an evangelical pastor and founder of the Vineyard Movement.

== Biblical basis ==
Christians who support the practice cite biblical evidence for its authenticity and use.

Michael Brown quotes a number of scriptures which he claims support the practice of being slain in the Spirit. Wayne Grudem states that while the phrase "slaying in the Spirit" is not found in Scripture, there are a number of instances where people are described as falling to the ground or falling into a trance in the presence of God.

Claimed Biblical examples
Passage	Description
Ezekiel 1:28	Ezekiel saw the appearance of the likeness of the glory of the Lord and fell face-down. Similar in 3:23
Daniel 10:5–18	As Daniel saw and heard a vision, his strength left him and he became helpless, then he was unconscious face down, then later trembling on his hands and knees
Matthew 17:6	Three disciples fell face-down to the ground, overwhelmed, on the mount of transfiguration.
Revelation 1:10–18	The Apostle John heard a loud voice behind him, then he turned to see the voice and "fell at His feet as though dead". Also see 4:10
Genesis 15:12; Exodus 40:35; Daniel 8:27; John 18:6; Acts 9:4, 10:10;	These are other passages that describe someone falling down but they are disputed because it is not clear if they involuntarily fell
Acts 19:12, 9:12, 28:8; Mark 5:30; James 5:14–15;	These passages are examples of how the power of God can be transferred by touch or by laying on of hands

== Criticisms ==
Christians who oppose the practice dispute the interpretation of those Bible passages, arguing that there is no biblical precedent and that the practice may be satanic in origin. Those skeptical of the practice have explained it as being caused by hypnosis, autosuggestion, or peer pressure. Christians who lean toward cessationism tend to refute the claim that this practice is scriptural such as Calvinist pastor and author John MacArthur who argues that the practice is neither described nor prescribed specifically in the Bible and that it is, at best, of satanic origin. Some within Charismatic Christianity critique the practice, such as David Pawson, a Bible teacher and charismatic Christian, who states the closest Biblical reference is the story of Ananias and Sapphira, which has a quite different connotation.

== References in culture ==
The 1967 film Holy Ghost People by Peter Adair documented an Appalachian Pentecostal church service in which several people were slain in the Spirit.

== See also ==
- Holy laughter
- Toronto Blessing
