= Religious ecstasy =

Altered state of consciousness

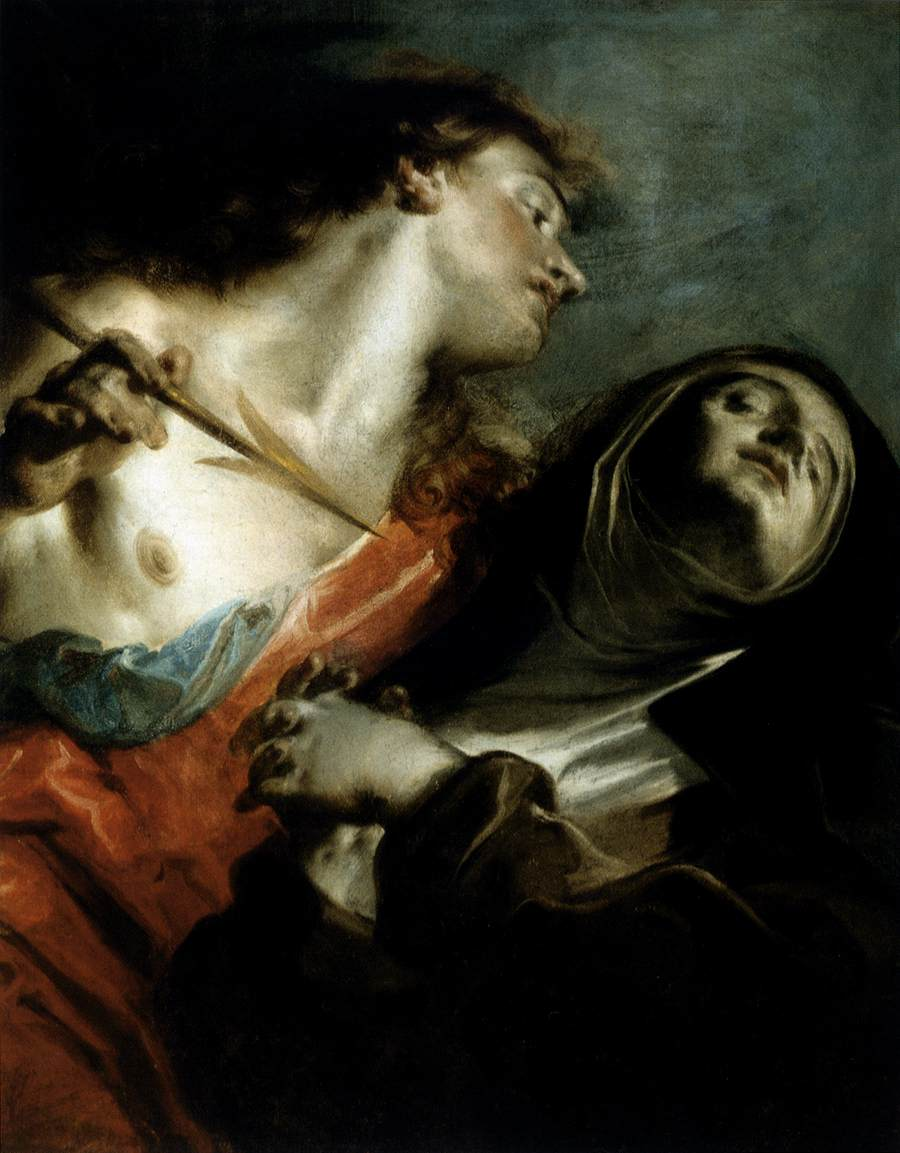
A Cherub piercing the heart of Saint Teresa of Avila while in religious ecstasy. Oil on canvas. Giuseppe Bazzani, circa 1750.

Religious ecstasy is a purported form of altered state of consciousness characterized by greatly reduced external awareness and reportedly expanded interior mental and spiritual awareness, frequently accompanied by visions and emotional (and sometimes physical) euphoria.

Although the experience is usually brief in time, there are records of such experiences lasting several days or even more, and of recurring experiences of ecstasy during a person's lifetime.

In Sufism, the term is referred to as wajd. In Buddhism, piti, usually translated as "joy" or "rapture", is an element of jhana, a state of mental oneness with an object that one focuses on in meditation.

== Context ==
The adjective "religious" means that the experience occurs in connection with religious activities or is interpreted in the context of a religion. Journalist Marghanita Laski writes in her study "Ecstasy in Religious and Secular Experiences", first published in 1961:

Epithets are very often applied to mystical experiences including ecstasies without, apparently, any clear idea about the distinctions that are being made. Thus we find experiences given such names as nature, religious, aesthetic, neo-platonic, etc.. experiences, where in some cases the name seems to derive from a trigger, sometimes from the over belief.

== History ==
=== Ancient ===
Yoga provides techniques to attain a state of ecstasy called samādhi. According to practitioners, there are various stages of ecstasy, the highest being nirvikalpa samādhi. Bhakti Yoga in particular places emphasis on ecstasy as being one of the fruits of its practice.

In Buddhism, especially in the Pali Canon, there are eight states of trance also called absorption. The first four states are rupa or, materially-oriented. The next four are arupa, or non-material. These eight states are preliminary trances which lead up to final saturation. In the Visuddhimagga, great effort and years of sustained meditation are practiced to reach the first absorption, and not all individuals can accomplish it at all.

==== Ancient Greece ====
Ecstasy in ancient Greece, notably in the Dionysian Mysteries, is characterized by ecstatic dance and god-like abilities and removed the inhibition and social constraints of dividing social elements such as gender and wealth. Unlike other mystery religions of the time, Dionysiac rites required no formal initiation and were accessible to all women, regardless of wealth or citizenship. Women were able to express themselves beyond domestic roles and engage in acts typically reserved for men, such as hunting and warfare.

All rites and rituals occurred outdoors, with women even sleeping outdoors under pine trees in the mountains. Despite being wild in nature, the rituals followed a deliberate structure. The Maenads (female followers of Dionysus) gathered at appointed times, arranged themselves in ranks, and sang sacred songs in a coordinated fashion. Typical attire, depicted on amphoras and other artistic mediums, includes women in long garbs, dancing barefoot with ivy wreaths on their heads. Their ritual cry was a communal call marking moments of spiritual climax.

Ecstasy was induced during rites through methods like music, primarily flute and drum, community dancing, and head-tossing. Their altered state of consciousness often involved vivid psychological experiences, such as hallucinations—seeing visions of Dionysos in the form of fire or a bull, or hearing his voice without seeing him. These experiences were not metaphorical but considered real manifestations of divine contact. In their ecstatic state, the Maenads were said to feed wild animals—such as fawns and wolf cubs—with their own milk. Using their thyrsoi (a staff or wand, typically made from a giant fennel stalk), they could produce wine, water, and honey from the earth or rock. Acts of extraordinary strength, such as tearing bulls apart and uprooting entire pine trees without tools, were viewed as signs of divine possession.

Euripides' The Bacchae, known for its depiction of ecstasy in this manner, describes the Maenads as being able to do superhuman things, such as carry open flames and walk barefoot in the snow without being physically hurt in any way. Dionysus blesses the Maenads with ecstasy and these god-like abilities to exact his revenge on Pentheus, allowing them to chase Pentheus' men away and remain unharmed against their iron javelins. Even Agave, Pentheus' own mother, is so compelled and entranced by the Dionysian ecstasy that she leads his defeat and presents his severed head back in Thebes, so deep in her hallucination that she believes it to be a lion head, and is confused when she is met with horror at the sight of the decapitated king.

=== Modern ===
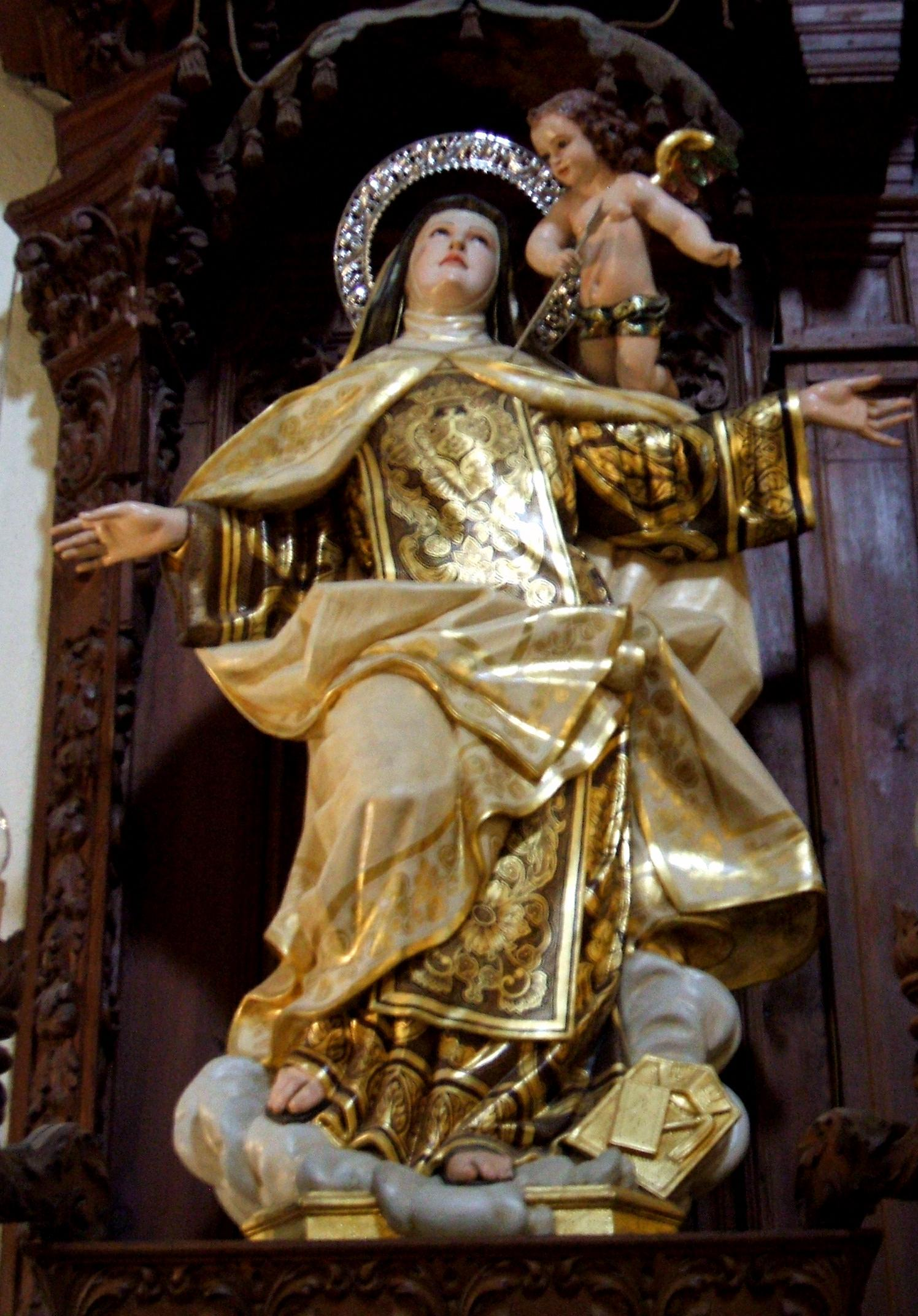
The religious ecstasy of Saint Teresa of Avila of the Carmelite Order

Modern meditator experiences in the Thai Forest Tradition, as well as other Theravadan traditions, demonstrate that this effort and rarity is necessary only to become completely immersed in the absorptions and experience no other sensations. It is possible to experience the absorptions in a less intense state with much less practice.

In the Christian tradition, ecstasy is usually associated with communion and oneness with God. However, such experiences can also be personal mystical experiences with no significance to anyone but the person experiencing them. Some charismatic Christians practice ecstatic states, such as "being slain in the Spirit", and interpret these as given by the Holy Spirit. The firewalkers of Greece dance themselves into a state of ecstasy at the annual Anastenaria, when they believe themselves under the influence of Constantine the Great.

Historically, large groups of individuals have experienced religious ecstasies during periods of Christian revivals, to the point of causing controversy as to the origin and nature of these experiences. In response to claims that all emotional expressions of religious ecstasy were attacks on order and theological soundness from the Devil, Jonathan Edwards published his influential Religious Affections. Here, he argues, religious ecstasy could come from oneself, the Devil, or God, and it was only by observing its fruit, or changes in inner thought and behaviour, that one could determine if the religious ecstasy had come from God.

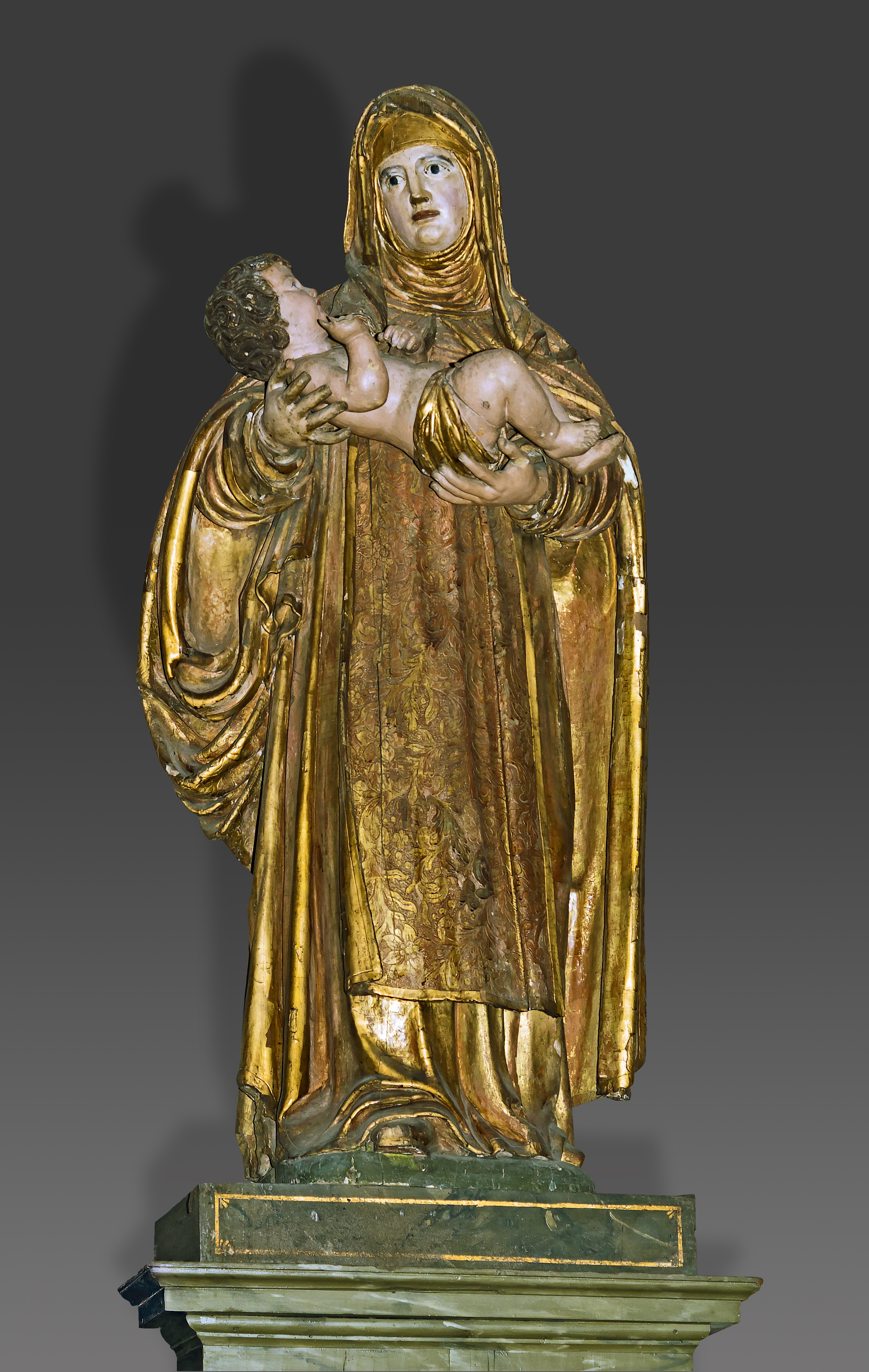
St. Rose of Lima, who was canonised in 1671, 54 years after her death

In modern Pentecostal, Charismatic and Spirit-filled Christianity, numerous examples of religious ecstasy have transpired, similar to historic revivals. These occurrences have changed significantly since the time of the Toronto Blessing and several other North American so-called revivals and outpourings from the mid-1990s. From that time, religious ecstasy in these movements has been characterized by increasingly unusual behaviors that are understood by adherents to be the anointing of the Holy Spirit and evidence of God's "doing a new work". One of the most controversial and strange examples is that of spiritual birthing —a practice during which women, and at times even men, claim to be having actual contractions of the womb while they moan and retch as though experiencing childbirth. It is said to be a prophetic action bringing spiritual blessings from God into the world. Many believe spiritual birthing to be highly demonic and more occult-like than Christian. Religious ecstasy in these Christian movements has also been witnessed in the form of squealing, shrieking, inability to stand or sit, uttering apocalyptic prophecies, holy laughter, crying, and barking. Some people have made dramatic claims of sighting "gold dust", "angel feathers", "holy clouds", or the spontaneous appearance of precious gem stones during ecstatic worship events.

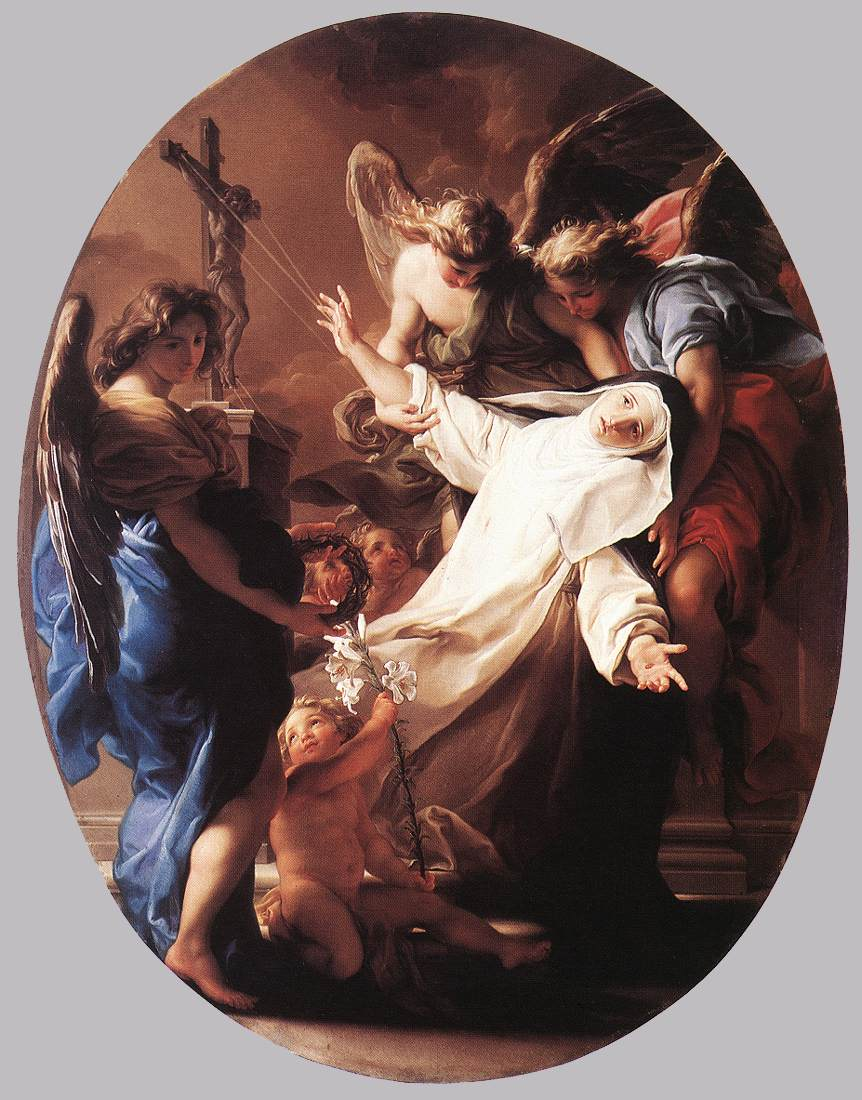
The Ecstasy of St. Catherine of Siena by Pompeo Batoni

In hagiographies (writings about Christian saints), many instances are recorded in which saints are granted ecstasies. According to the Catholic Encyclopedia, religious ecstasy (called "supernatural ecstasy") includes two elements: one, interior and invisible, in which the mind rivets its attention on a religious subject, and another, corporeal and visible, in which the activity of the senses is suspended, reducing the effect of external sensations upon the subject and rendering him or her resistant to awakening. The witnesses of a Marian apparition often describe experiencing these elements of ecstasy. The term "transverberation" has been used to describe a form of religious ecstasy that feels as if one has been spiritually pierced.

Modern witchcraft traditions may define themselves as "ecstatic traditions", and focus on reaching ecstatic states in their rituals. The Reclaiming Tradition and the Feri Tradition are two modern ecstatic witchcraft examples.

According to the Indian spiritual teacher Meher Baba, God-intoxicated souls known in Sufism as masts experience a unique type of spiritual ecstasy:

[M]asts are desperately in love with God – or consumed by their love for God. Masts do not suffer from what may be called a disease. They are in a state of mental disorder because their minds are overcome by such intense spiritual energies that are far too much for them, forcing them to lose contact with the world, shed normal human habits and customs, and civilized society and live in a state of spiritual splendor but physical squalor. They are overcome by an agonizing love for God and are drowned in their ecstasy. Only the divine love embodied in a Perfect Master can reach them.

== See also ==
- Altered state of consciousness – Any condition that is significantly different from a normal waking state
- Divine illumination – Human thought aided by divine grace
- Divine madness (religion) – Behavior linked to spiritual pursuits
- Ecstasy (philosophy) – Term used in philosophy with different meanings in different traditions
- Ecstasy (emotion) – Subjective experience of total involvement of subject with object of their awareness
- Enlightenment in Buddhism – Highest spiritual goal in Buddhist cultivation
- Entheogen – Psychoactive substance that induces spiritual experiences
- Eroto-comatose lucidity – Sex magic technique
- Higher consciousness – Aspirational level of awareness
- Mast (Sufism)
- Mysticism – Traditions of human transformation aided by religious experiences
- Neurotheology – Attempts to explain religious experience in neuroscientific terms
- Numinous – Arousing spiritual or religious emotion; mysterious or awe-inspiring
- Peak experience – Concept in psychology
- Religious experience – Experience interpreted within a religious framework
- Self-transcendence – Psychological concept: expansion of personal boundaries
- Sleeping preacher – Type of Christian preacher
- Soul flight – Shamanic practice

=== Notable individuals or movements ===
- Montanism – 2nd-century Christian movement, a prophetic sect, founded by Montanus and two female colleagues, Prisca (or Priscilla) and Maximilla, who attained ecstatic visions through fasting and prayer.
- Ippen Shōnin – Japanese Buddhist monk, a Japanese Buddhist itinerant preacher (hijiri) who has revolutionised the practice of Nembutsu.
- Ramakrishna Paramahamsa – Indian mystic (1836–1886),A Hindu mystic noted for prolonged states of Bhava Samadhi; the young Narendra (later Vivekananda) was encouraged to visit him when Professor William Hastie, lecturing on Wordsworth’s The Excursion, could not fully define “trance” and referred Narendra to Ramakrishna as one who had authentically experienced such a state.
- Alexander Scriabin – Russian composer and pianist (1872–1915), who intended his music to induce religious ecstasy.
- Anastenaria – Greek firewalking ritual
- Thomas Aquinas – Italian Dominican friar and philosopher (1225–1274) experienced an ecstasy during a church-service towards the end of his life that caused him to stop writing.
- Dionysos / Bacchus – Ancient Greek god of winemaking and wine, religious ecstasy and ritual madness.
- Teresa of Avila – Spanish Carmelite mystic and saint (1515–1582), Mystic, first entered states of ecstasy while studying religious texts when taken ill in a Carmelite cloister.
- Catherine of Siena – Italian Dominican philosopher and saint (1347–1380), an important figure in bridal theology
- Hildegard of Bingen – German nun and polymath (c. 1098 – 1179), abbess and Christian mystic.
- Joan of Arc – French folk heroine and saint (1412–1431), motivated by ecstatic visions to partake in war.
- Caitanya Mahaprabhu – Indian Vaishnavite Hindu saint (1486–1534), founder of Gaudiya Vaishnavism, immersed into deeper and deeper stages of ecstasy towards Krishna during the last 24 years of his life.
- Pio of Pietrelcina – 20th-century Italian saint, priest, stigmatist and mystic (1887–1968)
- Joseph of Cupertino – Italian Franciscan friar
- Rabia Basri – Female Sufi scholar and saint (died 801), mystic poet
- Maulanah Rumi – Sufi mystic and poet (1207–1273), mystic poet
- Hafez – Persian poet and mystic (1325–1390), mystic poet
- Moinuddin Chishti – Persian Islamic scholar and mystic (1143–1236)
- Amir Khusrow – Indian poet, writer, singer and scholar (1253–1325) mystic poet
- Marguerite Porete – French mystic and poet (died 1310), burned at the stake for her writings.
- Simone Weil – French philosopher (1909–1943)
- Fyodor Dostoevsky – Russian novelist with epilepsy, notable for including Christian themes, described feelings of religious euphoria before a seizure would take place (1821-1881)
