= Richard Nathan =

Richard Nathan may refer to:

- Richard M. Nathan, Indian cinematographer
- Richard P. Nathan, American academic
- Richard Kwesi Nathan, Ghanaian footballer

== See also ==
- Rich Nathan, American pastor and author
