= Kevin Prosch =

American songwriter (born 1955)

- Born: 1955 (age 70–71); Birmingham, Alabama, US
- Genres: Gospel
- Occupations: Musician; Songwriter
- Instruments: Guitar; Mandolin; Piano

Kevin Prosch (born c. 1955) is an American gospel musician known for playing guitar, mandolin, and key piano. He has been involved in Christian ministry, leading Bible studies and speaking at seminars on prophetic worship. Prosch has collaborated with figures such as John Wimber and the Vineyard movement, as well as Morning Star Ministries. He also formed the band The Black Peppercorns alongside former Iona drummer Martin Neil.

== Early life ==
Prosch was raised in Birmingham, Alabama, and has spoken about facing challenges in his early life, including family difficulties and experiences with racism. He has described a pivotal religious experience in his youth, which he attributes to an encounter with a preacher named Gabriel.

Prosch gained prominence in the 1990s through his association with the Vineyard movement, releasing several albums including "Unto The King" and "Even So Come".

Prosch's association with the Vineyard movement began in the early 1990s. His introduction to Vineyard came through a "prophetic experience" at a conference with Paul Cain and Mike Bickel, where he shared a vision with Carl Tuttle, a key figure in Vineyard music. This encounter led to an invitation to Anaheim, resulting in Prosch's first recording with Vineyard, "Unto The King," followed by "King Of Saints". Although Vineyard's typical musical style was more conservative than Prosch's, they provided him his first opportunity to record. Prosch pushed for a more spontaneous, live-recording approach, which influenced subsequent Vineyard productions. While briefly serving as an assistant pastor for Vineyard, Prosch eventually established his own ministry.

== Music career ==
His most notable songs include “Harp In My Heart", “Highest Praise”, “So Come”, "Show Your Power" and "Love Is All You Need". Prosch has collaborated with a number of other musicians including Bryn Haworth. Prosch's 1995 album, Tumbling Ground, was produced by Ethan Johns. He composed the worship song "He brought me to His banqueting table (His banner over me)", based on the Song of Solomon.

He also produces Christian music artists under his own label, "Third Ear Music". Prosch served as the worship pastor with John Wimber in California in the early years of the Vineyard Church movement..

Prosch was a senior associate pastor of More Church in Amarillo, Texas until early 2013. Prosch now resides in the Kansas City, Missouri area.

== Controversies ==
In April 19, 1999, Prosch stepped down from his leadership position at a local church after admitting to having "committed adultery and used my gifting to manipulate the women involved... for my own selfish gain and personal pleasure". Writing to the local Christian community, in an open letter, he expressed his sorrow to his ex-wife, family, and friends for "disappointing and hurting you". In 2002, he was "restored to public ministry three years after admitting to a string of affairs".

In early 2024, Prosch was reported to have had an affair with Misty Edwards, following their public intoxication and DUI arrests where he appeared shirtless in police photographs alongside Edwards. The initial report claimed that International House of Prayer staff member Brent Steeno provided additional evidence of the affair, which noted Prosch's use of blackmail to coerce Edwards into maintaining secrecy.

== Discography ==
- 2013: The Gift (with Heidi Baker)
- 2009: The High Places and Artifacts (with Leonard Jones)
- 2007: True Riches (with Keith Miller)
- 2006: The Language of Eden (with Todd Bentley)
- 2002: Palanquin (Forerunner Records)
- 1998: Reckless Mercy (Vertical Music)
- 1997: Journeys Of Life (7th Time Music)
- 1997: The Finer Things in Life (with Bryn Haworth)
- 1996: Kiss The Son (7th Time Music)
- 1995: Tumbling Ground (with The Black Peppercorns) Produced by Ethan Johns (7th Time Music, UPC/EAN: 649567050020)

Track list: Please, She Walks In Beauty, Love Is All You Need, Tumbling Ground, Thinking Of You, Come To Me, Hopelessly In Love, A Song For Natalia, Whang Dang Do

- 1993: Come To The Light (7th Time Music)
- 1991: Even So Come (Vineyard Music Group)
- 1991: Save Us Oh God (Featured Worship Leader) (Vineyard Music Group)
- 1990: King of Saints (Featured Worship Leader) (Vineyard Music Group)
- 1988: Hear Our Cry (Featured Worship Leader) (Vineyard Music Group)
