= Brusco =

Brusco is a surname. Notable people with the surname include:

- Mitchie Brusco (born 1997), American skateboarder
- Paolo Gerolamo Brusco (1742–1820), Italian painter
- Sarah Brusco (born 1978), American Christian musician
- Sebastián Brusco (born 1974), Argentine footballer
