= Spiritual drunkenness =

Pentecostal and Charismatic religious experience

Spiritual drunkenness refers to a phenomenon seen in some Christian denominations, particularly those associated with Pentecostalism and the Charismatic Movement, in which individuals who are said to be experiencing intense momentary visitations of—or even possession by—the Holy Spirit exhibit a range of behaviors resembling signs of moderate to severe alcoholic inebriation, including unsteadiness, uncontrollable laughter, silly expressions or gestures, verbal or nonverbal shouting (not typically in the form of glossolalia), sudden intense fatigue, and temporary unconsciousness. The phenomenon is typically at the prompting of a preacher or pastor, and most often involving multiple members of a congregation at a time, generally after having been transferred from one person to another via respiratory blowing or laying on of hands. It may also be described in settings like housegroups and fellowship meetings. Practitioners seek a deeper encounter with God.

The concept of spiritual drunkenness is controversial among non-Pentecostal denominations. Opponents cite a lack of explicit biblical description of anything resembling spiritual drunkenness, and some posit that the behaviors may even be the product of demonic influence.

== See also ==
- Slain in the Spirit
- Speaking in tongues
- Pentecostalism
