= The Network (group of churches) =

International group of churches

- Classification: Pentecostal
- Region: United States
- Founder: Steve Morgan
- Origin: 2006; United States

The Network is an international group of churches known for planting new churches by recruiting college men, training and developing them into leaders within the group.

== History ==
The Network was started by Steve Morgan in 1995 when he established Vineyard Community Church in Carbondale, Illinois. Morgan and 50 members of his Carbondale congregation moved to Seattle in 2004 to found Blue Sky Church.

In 2006, Steve Morgan removed Blue Sky Church from the Vineyard Association alongside several midwest Vineyard churches to officially birth the Network as an international group of churches focused on planting new churches, and the Carbondale Vineyard was renamed to Vine Church.

== Network Churches within the United States ==
Year founded	Church	City	State	Left Network
1995	Vine Church	Carbondale	Illinois	
2002	Foundation Church	Bloomington-Normal	Illinois	
2004	Blue Sky Church	Bellevue	Washington	
2006	Clear River Church	Lafayette	Indiana	
2008	High Rock Church	Bloomington	Indiana	
2011	Brookfield Church	Athens	Ohio	
2012	Hills Church	Pullman	Washington	
2013	Rock Hills Church	Bowling Green	Kentucky	
2013	Cedar Heights Church	State College	Pennsylvania	
2015	Oaks Church	Muncie	Indiana	
2015	Summit Creek Church	Eugene	Oregon	
2015	Valley Springs Church	Corvallis	Oregon	
2016	Vista Church	San Luis Obispo	California	
2016	Vida Springs Church	Gainesville	Florida	
2016	North Pines Church	Kalamazoo	Michigan	
2017	Christland Church	College Station	Texas	
2017	Joshua Church	Austin	Texas	
2018	Rock River Church	San Marcos	Texas	
2018	Bright Field Church	Dekalb	Illinois	
2019	South Grove Church	Athens	Georgia	
2019	Hosea Church	Raleigh	North Carolina	
2019	Mountain Heights Church	Morgantown	West Virginia	
2020	Ascent Church	Blacksburg	Virginia	
2021	Isaiah Church	Madison	Wisconsin	

== Network Churches outside the United States ==
Church	Church	Year founded	Country
2018	Roots Church	Taipei	Taiwan
2022	Stoneway Church	Reading, Berkshire	United Kingdom

== Controversy ==
Criticisms against the Network include their college recruitment practices, teachings on the role of women, dismissal of claims of abuse, and the authoritarian leadership style as reported by former members. Network churches have also faced scruitiny for allegedly encouraging members to sever relationships with family who do not attend.

The qualifications of Network founder and pastor Steve Morgan have been questioned because of his arrest in 1987 for an alleged sexual crime. The Former Vineyard officials who knew Steve Morgan during his ordination into the Vineyard association have issued statements denying knowledge of his arrest.

Multiple associated churches left The Network after national news coverage of these controversies.

== See also ==
- Association of Vineyard Churches
