= Sarah Brusco =

American Christian musician

- Also known as: Sarah Brusco
- Born: Sarah Theresa Pinkerton; October 6, 1978 (age 47); Ohio
- Origin: Augusta, Georgia
- Genres: CCM, folk, worship
- Occupations: Singer, songwriter
- Instruments: Vocals, singer-songwriter
- Years active: 2014–present
- Labels: Vineyard, Sarah Brusco
- Website: morningandnightmusic.com/artist/sarah-brusco/

Sarah Brusco (born October 6, 1978, as Sarah Theresa Pinkerton), is an American Christian musician. Her first album, The Woven Whisper, was released by herself alongside Vineyard Music in 2014.

== Early life ==
She was born in the State of Ohio on October 6, 1978, as Sarah Theresa Pinkerton, the daughter of Boyd Eugene Pinkerton and Catherine Ann Pinkerton (née, Emery). Brusco became a Christian, when she was 19 years old, while attending Vineyard Church in Columbus, Ohio. She directed small group worship experiences for members of the congregation.

== Music career ==
Her music recording career commenced in 2014, with the album, The Woven Whisper, and it was released by herself alongside Vineyard Music on August 13, 2014, after a crowdfunding campaign project on Kickstarter. The album's title came from a tapestry she inherited from her grandmother-in-law that was made by her sister, Marie Kelly, and it's now hung in the couples living room. It was meant to convey the "idea of God speaking to us in our dreams as well." She claims her recent musical influences to be Julianna Barwick, Jónsi, and Sigur Rós. Brusco spent some time in Northern Ireland with Christian songwriter Kathryn Scott, as her intern learning her craft of songwriting.

== Personal life ==
She married her husband, Eben, at 24 years old in Ohio on July 11, 2003, while they were members of Vineyard Church. Brusco's first pregnancy resulted in a tumor forming around her ovary causing her vocal cords to harden and leaving her unable to sing. Her medical professionals said she would never regain the capacity to vocally perform as she did before the illness. However, God healed them over time, letting her once again sing. Along with her husband, the couple lived in Chicago, Illinois, for three years, trying to accomplish racial healing through music ministry. They eventually relocated to Augusta, Georgia with their two children where they are currently active in the ministry of their local church.

== Discography ==
Studio albums

- The Woven Whisper (August 13, 2014, Vineyard/Sarah Brusco)
