= Bruski =

Bruski (feminine: Bruska) is a Polish surname. It may be transliterated as Brusky. Notable people with the surname include:

- Alojzy Bruski (1914–1946), Polish military officer of the Polish Army
- Alojzy Bruski (1915–1998), Polish leader of the Iskra underground organization
- Amanda Hollis-Brusky, an American political scientist
- Dawid Bruski (1897–1980), Polish teacher, politician of Senate of Poland
- E. S. Brusky (1921 – 2013), an American doctor
- Ireneusz Bruski (born 1961), Polish presbyter of Roman Catholic Archdiocese of Warmia
- Jan Jacek Bruski (born 1969), Polish historian
- Józef Ludwik Bruski (1908–1974), Polish medical doctor, soldier
- Rafał Bruski (born 1962), Polish politician, president of Bydgoszcz
- Tom Brusky (born 1969), an American musician
- Yakov Brusky, who invented Brusky's hexagonal chess in 1966

== See also ==
- Bruschi
