= Gelotology =

Study of laughter and its effects

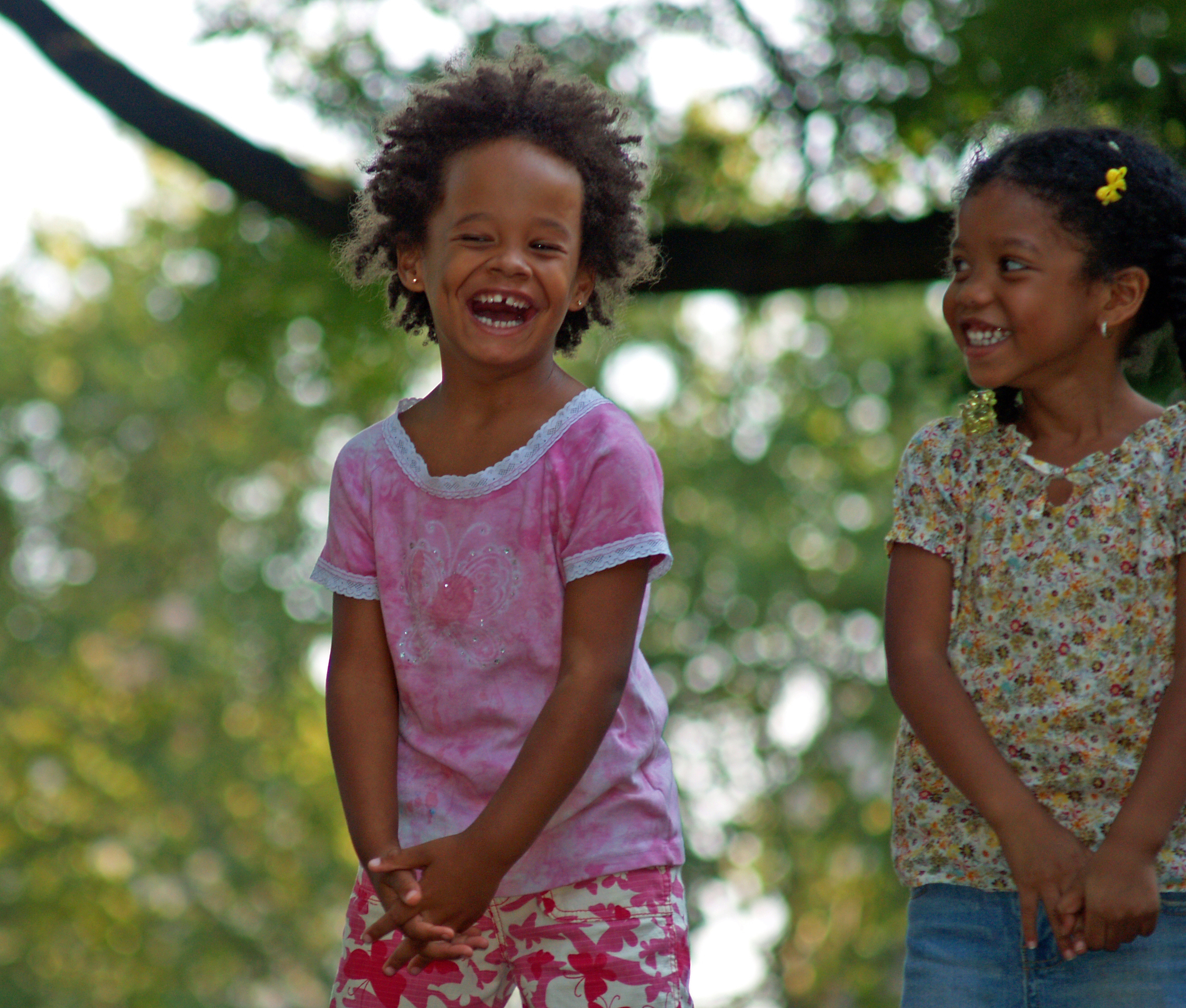
Two girls laughing

Gelotology (from the Greek γέλως gelos "laughter") is the study of laughter and its effects on the body, from a psychological and physiological perspective. Its proponents often advocate induction of laughter on therapeutic grounds in alternative medicine. The field of study was pioneered by William F. Fry of Stanford University.

== History ==
Gelotology was first studied by psychiatrists, although some doctors in antiquity recommended laughter as a form of medicine. It was initially deprecated by most other physicians, who doubted that laughter possessed analgesic qualities. One early study that demonstrated the effectiveness of laughter in a clinical setting showed that laughter could help patients with atopic dermatitis respond less to allergens. Other studies have shown that laughter can help alleviate stress and pain, and can assist cardiopulmonary rehabilitation.

== Types of therapy ==
Several types of therapy have emerged which use laughter to help patients.

- Humor and Laughter Therapy consists of the use of humorous materials such as books, shows, movies, or stories to encourage spontaneous discussion of the patients' own humorous experiences. This can be provided individually or in a group setting. The process is facilitated by a clinician. It can also be used in conversation between medical professionals and patients.
- Laughter Meditation possesses similarities to traditional meditation. However, it is the laughter that focuses the person to concentrate on the moment, through a three-stage process of stretching, intentional laughing, and a period of meditative silence. It is sometimes done in group settings.
- Laughter Yoga is somewhat similar to traditional yoga, it is an exercise which incorporates breathing, yoga, and stretching techniques, along with laughter. The structured format includes several laughter exercises for a period of 30 to 45 minutes facilitated by a trained individual. It can be used as supplemental or preventative therapy.

== See also ==
- Holy laughter
- Theories of humor
