= Rich Nathan =

American pastor and author (born 1955)

- Born: 1955 (age 70–71); New York City
- Occupations: Pastor and author
- Spouse: Marlene Nathan

Rich Nathan (born December 1955) is an American pastor and author who has been the senior Pastor of Vineyard Columbus since 1987. In January 2021, Pastor Nathan handed the Senior Pastor role to Eric and Julia Pickerill. He is still on staff as Founding Pastor and in charge of the Pastors Residency Program.

== Early life and education ==
Nathan came to believe in Jesus at the age of 18. Prior to pastoring, he was an assistant professor of business law at Ohio State University for five years. He has bachelor's degrees in history and religious studies from Case Western Reserve University in Cleveland, Ohio graduating magna cum laude, and a J.D. with honors from Ohio State University's Moritz College of Law in Columbus, Ohio.

== Career ==
Nathan has served on the National Board of Vineyard USA for more than 20 years and is the Large Church Task Force Coordinator.

Nathan has been outspoken on the subject of faith and politics. In an interview with the Columbus Dispatch, he was quoted as saying:

We think the Gospel has political implications, but it's not partisan. And we don't think that either the Republicans or the Democrats have the sole possession of the implications of the Gospel.

Nathan also advocates for immigration reform, promoting "a pathway to citizenship governed by a system of checks and balances." He has led Vineyard Columbus to embrace racial and ethnic diversity. Vineyard Columbus is one of America's most diverse churches, having attendees from over 125 nations.

== Vineyard Columbus ==
Vineyard Columbus (formerly Vineyard Christian Fellowship of Columbus and Vineyard Church of Columbus) is a church in Northland area of Columbus near Westerville, Ohio. It is part of the Association of Vineyard Churches, headquartered in Sugar Land, Texas.

Vineyard Columbus was founded in the late-1970s when three different churches joined to form the first church. The church remained independent of any larger group, until the leadership of the church decided on the Association of Vineyard Churches, led by John Wimber. They became the Vineyard Christian Fellowship of Columbus in 1987. Vineyard Columbus draws about 7,500 people from over 125 nations at its weekend worship services and is the largest church in the Vineyard movement today.

The original church in Westerville has planted more than 30 churches since 1987, including over a dozen in the Columbus area - all included in the Vineyard Movement.

In January 2021, Rich was succeeded by associate pastors Eric and Julia Pickerill. Eric and Julia planted the Vineyard of Amsterdam in 2008 before returning to Vineyard Columbus in 2015. Rich Nathan will remain of the staff at Vineyard Columbus as pastor at-large.

=== Satellite Campuses ===
In 2009, Vineyard Columbus opened its first satellite campus, Vineyard Columbus Sawmill Campus, in Dublin, OH. This campus grew rapidly and started holding 2 services (9am and 11am) as of September 2013. In 2011, VC opened its second campus, Lane Avenue Campus of Vineyard Columbus. In the fall of 2012, VC launched its third campus, East Campus, at Berwick Alternative Elementary School. In early 2015, East Campus joined forces with the Eastside Vineyard church plant in Pickerington and moved operations out there. Vineyard Columbus also has a La Vina Spanish language campus.

== Bibliography ==
- Who Is My Enemy ISBN 0-310-23882-X
- (Co-authored) Empowered Evangelicals with Ken Wilson ISBN 0-89283-929-5
- (Co-authored) Both-And: Living the Christ-Centered Life in an Either-Or World with Insoo Kim ISBN 0-83083-766-3
