= Bruschi =

Bruschi is an Italian surname. Notable people with the surname include:

- Abigaille Bruschi-Chiatti (c. 1855–after 1888), Italian soprano
- Andrea Bruschi (born 1968), Italian actor
- Domenico Bruschi (1840–1910), Italian painter
- Pietro Bruschi (born 1952), Italian sprint canoer
- Tedy Bruschi (born 1973), former professional American football linebacker
- Ramiro Washington Bruschi (born 1981), Uruguayan football forward

== See also ==
- Brusco
- Bruski
