= Zabawa coat of arms =

Polish coat of arms

Zabawa
- Earliest mention: 1470
- Towns: none
- Families: Bruski, Bubelwic, Bubełwic, Brzeziński, Drochecki, Dąbrowski, Koczeński, Koczyński, Koczywski, Kościelecki, Pierocki, Pirocki, Pirucki, Spiczak Breziński, Szwyradzki, Świradzki, Węchadłowski, Zabawski

Zabawa is a Polish coat of arms. It was used by several szlachta families in the times of the Polish–Lithuanian Commonwealth.

== Notable bearers ==
Notable bearers of this coat of arms include:

- Pełka Kościelecki
- Alfred Christian Koczynski
- Alexander Koczynski

== Zabawa coat of arms bearers ==
Surname: Bruski, Bubelwic, Bubełwic, Drochecki, Dąbrowski, Koczeński, Koczyński, Koczywski, Kościelecki, Piasecki, Pierocki, Pirocki, Pirucki, Sokół, Spiczak Brzeziński, Szwyradzki, Węchadłowski, Włodek, Zabawski, Świradzki, Świraski.

== See also ==
- Polish heraldry
- Heraldry
- Coat of arms

== Sources ==
- Dynastic Genealogy
- Ornatowski.com
