= Karen Breschi =

American ceramic artist

- Born: 1941 (age 83–84); Oakland, California

Karen Breschi (born 1941) is an American ceramic artist. Her work is included in the collections of the Smithsonian American Art Museum, the Oakland Museum of California, the San Francisco Museum of Modern Art and the Museum of Contemporary Art, Chicago
