= Margaret Poloma =

American sociologist

Margaret M. Poloma (born August 27, 1943) is an American sociologist, professor, and author who is known for her research on the Pentecostal movement in American Christianity. Poloma began her career as a sociologist with her research on two-career and child-free couples. Early in her career she wrote on contemporary sociological theory, before shifting her focus to the sociology of religion.

As a sociologist of religion, Poloma has used her personal experiences as a charismatic Roman Catholic as inspiration various research projects. Poloma has written extensively about religious experience in contemporary American society, including studies of prayer, Pentecostalism, contemporary revivals and divine healing. Much of this work has focused on diverse Pentecostal spiritualities (i.e., denominational Pentecostal, charismatic, Third Wave, neo-Pentecostal, etc.), as reported in Charismatic Movement; The Assemblies of God at the Crossroad; Main Street Mystics; Blood and Fire (with psychologist Ralph W. Hood); and The Assemblies of God (with political scientist John C. Green).

Poloma's research on prayer (cf., Varieties of Prayer with eminent statistician George H. Gallup Jr.) served as a bridge between Pentecostal spirituality and common spiritual experiences of American Christians through data collected in two national surveys.

== Bibliography ==
- Contemporary sociological theory, Macmillan, 1979, ISBN 0-02-396100-7, ISBN 978-0-02-396100-7
- The Assemblies of God at the crossroads: charisma and institutional dilemmas, Univ. of Tennessee Press, 1989, ISBN 0-87049-607-7, ISBN 978-0-87049-607-3
- Varieties of prayer: a survey report, co-author with George Gallup, Jr., Trinity Press International, 1991, ISBN 1-56338-007-2, ISBN 978-1-56338-007-5
- Main street mystics: the Toronto blessing and reviving Pentecostalism, Rowman Altamira, 2003, ISBN 0-7591-0354-2, ISBN 978-0-7591-0354-2
- Blood and fire: Godly love in a Pentecostal emerging church, co-author with Ralph W. Hood, NYU Press, 2008, ISBN 0-8147-6748-6, ISBN 978-0-8147-6748-1
- A Sociological Study of the Great Commandment in Pentecostalism: The Practice of Godly Love As Benevolent Service, co-author with Matthew T. Lee and Stephen G. Post, Edwin Mellen Press, 2009, ISBN 0-7734-3902-1, ISBN 978-0-7734-3902-3
