= Neo-charismatic movement =

Movement within evangelical Protestant Christianity

The neo-charismatic (also known as third-wave charismatic or hypercharismatic) movement is a movement within evangelical Christianity that is composed of a diverse range of independent churches and organizations that emphasize the current availability of gifts of the Holy Spirit, such as speaking in tongues and faith healing. The Neo-charismatic movement is considered to be the "third wave" of the Charismatic Christian tradition which began with Pentecostalism (the "first wave"), and was furthered by the Charismatic movement (the "second wave"). As a result of the growth of postdenominational and independent charismatic groups, Neo-charismatics are now believed to be more numerous than the first and second wave categories. As of 2002, some 19,000 denominations or groups, with approximately 295 million individual adherents, were identified as Neo-charismatic.

== History ==
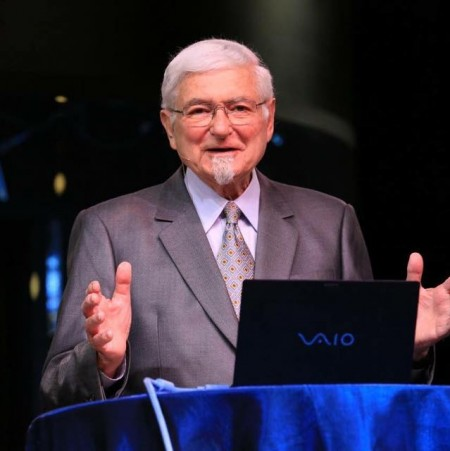
C. Peter Wagner is a leader among Neo-charismatics in the U.S., and is known for naming the Neo-charismatic movement the "third wave" of Charismatic Christianity.

The "first wave" of Charismatic Christianity is Pentecostalism, which originated in Kansas, US in 1901, and later spread to Texas, Los Angeles, and then to other countries. Pentecostals formed their own churches and organizations, but by the 1960s their emphasis on the outpouring of the Holy Spirit and signs and wonders began to influence mainline Protestant denominations and the "second wave," or the charismatic movement, began. The Neo-charismatic movement, dubbed the "third wave", dates from the early 1980s and was a result of the growth of Pentecostal experiences among independent and indigenous Christian groups. Although the Neo-charismatic movement emerged in the 1980s, many churches in Africa were already exhibiting Neo-charismatic tendencies in the early twentieth century as some churches combined indigenous cosmologies with what are called the gifts of the Holy Spirit. The greatest concentration of Neo-charismatic churches is found in Africa, Asia, and Latin America. In some regions, especially Africa and Latin America, Neo-charismatics are sometimes condemned by Pentecostals and Charismatics for their spiritual practices or for combining local cosmologies with Christian beliefs.

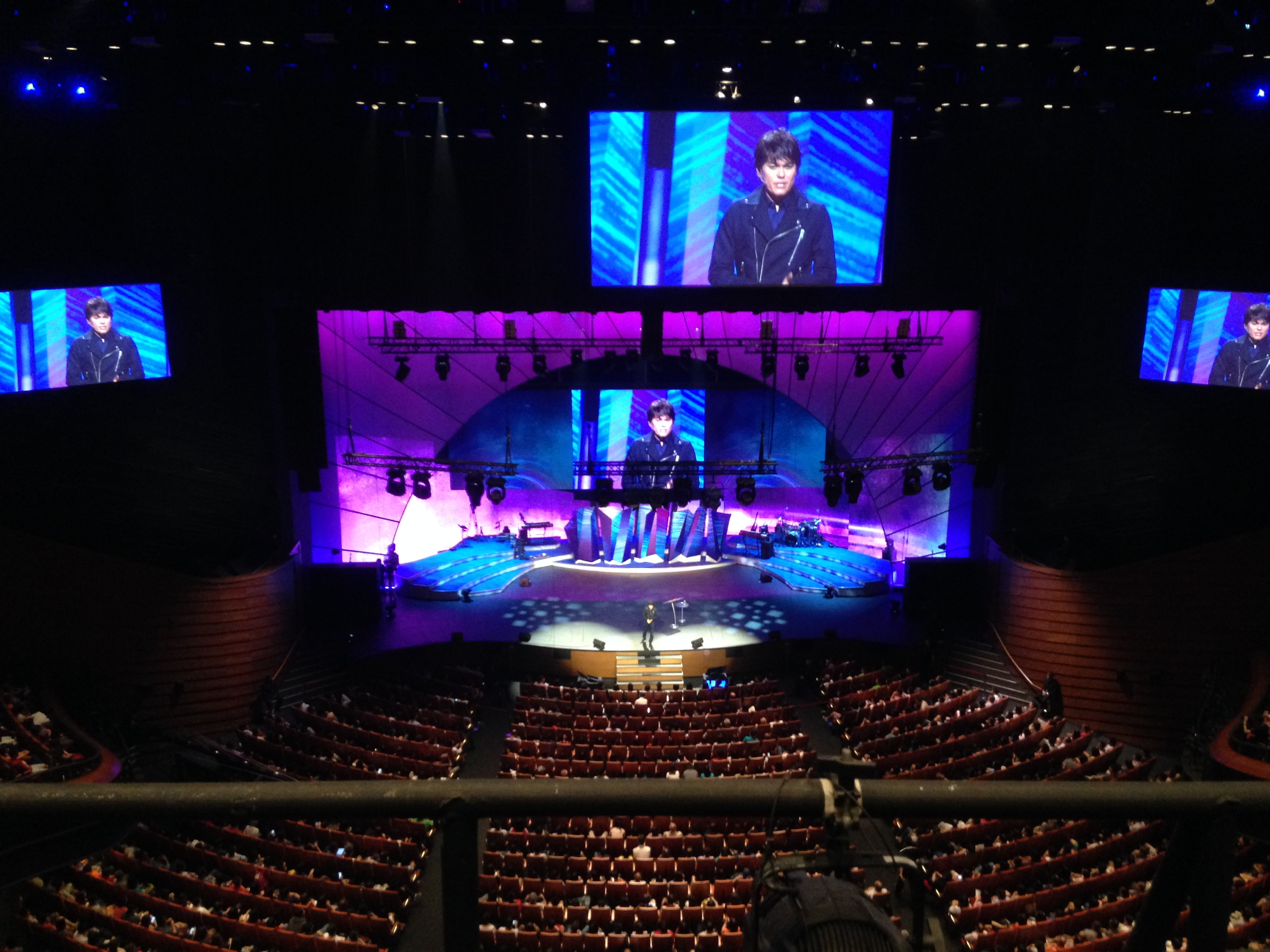
Worship service at New Creation Church in Singapore, 2015.

Peter Wagner, who originally called this form of Christianity the "Third Wave" and is a theoretician of the Church Growth Movement, advocated for the principle of spiritual warfare against demons through his book Spiritual Power and Church Growth. John Wimber, who founded the Association of Vineyard Churches in 1982, put forward the principle of "miraculous healing" as an element of the Christian life in his book Power Healing. The current of "power evangelism" was developed through the work of John Wimber and publicized through his book Power Evangelism. Together, Wagner and Wimber taught a course on Neo-charismatic spiritual gifts called "Signs, Wonders, and Church Growth" at Fuller Theological Seminary for four years starting in 1982. Wagner also popularized the concept of territorial spirits, in which demons are believed to rule over geographical locations. George Otis Junior is one of the originators of "spiritual mapping," which is a practice among some third wave adherents that includes uncovering the histories of buildings and geographical locations to understand how those histories might be contributing to demonic possession in the present. In 2002, some 19,000 denominations or groups, with approximately 295 million individual adherents, were identified as Neo-charismatic.

== Defining characteristics ==
In terms of congregational governance, no single form, structure, or style of church service characterizes all Neo-charismatic services and churches. The Neo-charismatic categorization is broad and diverse and includes any group that is not considered Pentecostal or Charismatic but still emphasizes the power of the Holy spirit and supernatural signs and wonders. Pentecostals comprise Pentecostal denominations, charismatics bring Pentecostal tendencies to mainline denominations, but Neo-charismatics are indigenous, independent, post- and non-denominational Christian groups without formal denominational ties. The term non-denominational is used more often by churches than the Neo-charismatic term.

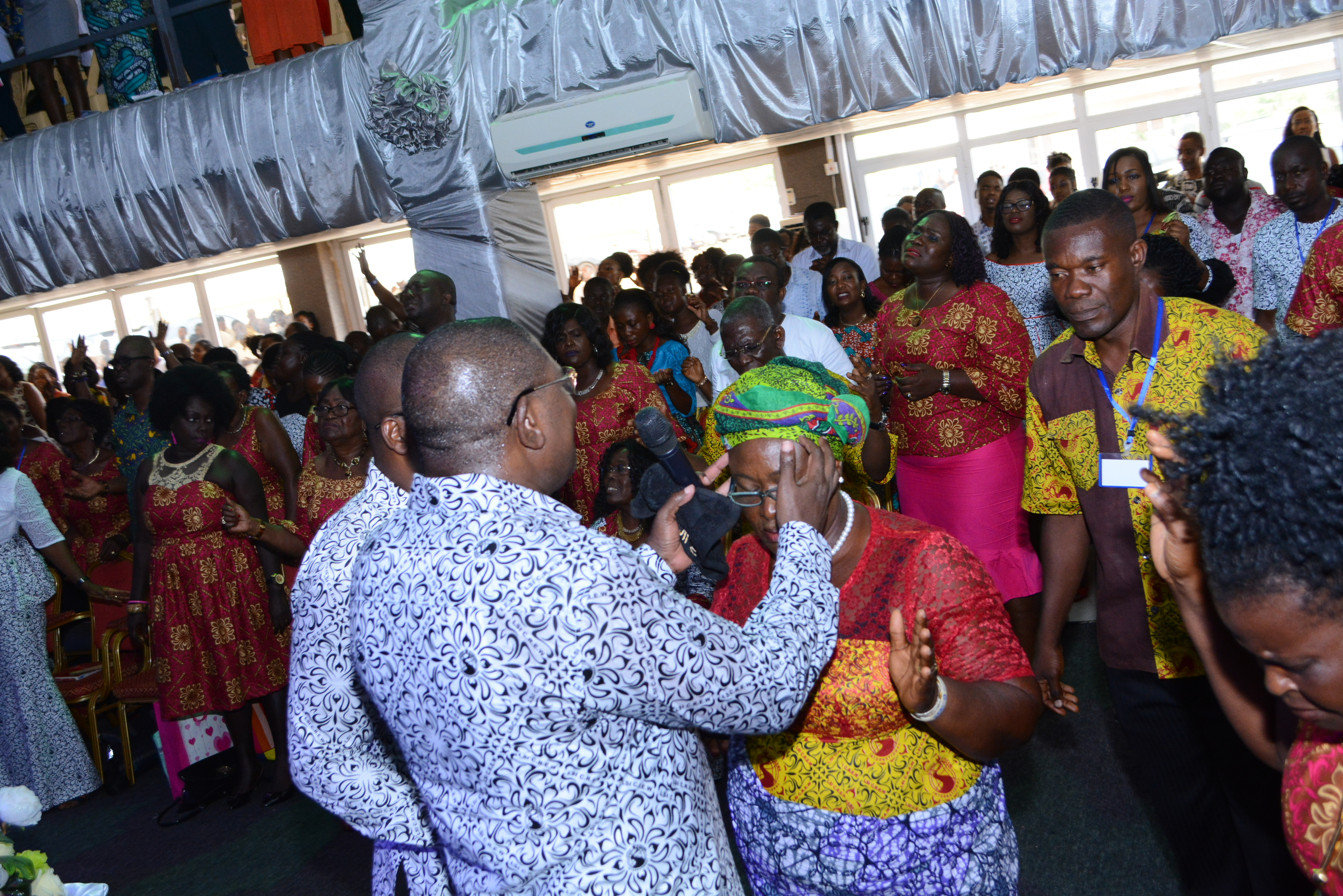
Example of laying on of hands during a service in Ghana.

Members of the Neo-charismatic movement, like those in the Pentecostal movement and Charismatic movement, believe in and stress the post-biblical availability of gifts of the Holy Spirit. These spiritual gifts, or charismata, frequently include but are not limited to glossolalia (speaking in tongues), healing, and prophecy. Additionally, Neo-charismatic Christians practice the laying on of hands and seek the "infilling" of the Holy Spirit, although a specific experience of baptism with the Holy Spirit may not be requisite for experiencing such gifts. Neo-charismatic practices look very similar to Pentecostal and Charismatic practices, but the terminology used by Neo-charismatics to describe their practices is distinct from the typical terminology used by Pentecostals and Charismatics. Many Neo-charismatics believe that the "end times" are near, practice intercessory prayer that invokes the power of the Holy Spirit, and view their work as helping to transform the Church into the Kingdom of God on earth.

== Notable practices ==
The practices and beliefs listed below are common but not universal among Neo-charismatics, but the diversity of churches and opinions means none necessarily adhere to all the following.

=== Spiritual warfare ===
The fight against spiritual demons that are deemed to exist occupies an important place in Neo-charismatic teachings and prayers. The exorcising of demons is sometimes also referred to as deliverance ministries because a person or object is "delivered" or saved from an evil spiritual force. Spiritual mapping, a subset of practices under the broad umbrella of spiritual warfare, is the process by which defiled land, houses, and churches are discovered through careful observation of the history of the region and are subsequently illustrated on a map. A relatively well-known example of this type of spiritual mapping occurred in Amarillo, Texas, by the group Repent Amarillo. If traumatic or evil histories are believed to have been uncovered, mass exorcisms are sometimes organized intended to drive out territorial or historical demons in an ancestral line. "Prayerwalking" is another encouraged form of spiritual warfare among some Neo-charismatics, and is connected to spiritual mapping: believers pray against evil spirits while walking through areas where evil is believed to have taken place historically or currently. Territorial spirits are a related concept. One scholar notes that while spiritual warfare did not hold a major role in broader evangelicalism, Wagner's Spiritual Warfare Network of the 1980s led to it quickly and significantly gaining importance in evangelicalism. This occurred to such a degree that "the new ideas on spiritual warfare became so entrenched that many Christians would have had no conception that they were only recently implemented. Proponents contributed to this by claiming there was historical precedent in Christian tradition."

=== Power evangelism ===
Neo-charismatic evangelism considers that "Signs and Wonders" can be brought about by Christians who have confessed their belief in the Holy Spirit and have been anointed to do miracles. Healing and financial prosperity are examples of "power encounters," or supernatural acts, that occur in this type of evangelism. Neo-charismatics believe power evangelism, in which supernatural wonders accompany the sharing of the Gospel message, is more effective than evangelism without signs and is more similar to the type of evangelism that first-century Christians used.

=== Structural renewal ===
Some Neo-charismatics are interested in the reconfiguration of church leadership to reflect a structure they believe is upheld in Ephesians 4:11–13, "The gifts he gave were that some would be apostles, some prophets, some evangelists, some pastors and teachers, to equip the saints for the work of ministry, for building up the body of Christ, until all of us come to the unity of the faith and of the knowledge of the Son of God, to maturity, to the measure of the full stature of Christ." In this passage, there are five "offices," including apostle, prophet, evangelist, pastor and teacher. Pastors, teachers, and evangelists are commonly found in evangelical churches, but some Neo-charismatic groups and movements, like Five Fold Ministry and the New Apostolic Reformation, seek to restructure their church organization to actively include apostles and prophets.

== Controversies ==
Various Christian groups have criticized the Pentecostal and charismatic movement for too much attention to mystic manifestations such as glossolalia and to anti-intellectualism.

In 2013, the Evangelical pastor John F. MacArthur criticized the charismatic movement on several points which he said were "patently unbiblical", including the majority support for prosperity theology which led to moral and financial scandals; its proximity to the New Age movements where God is presented as a servant of the needs of believers; multiple false prophecies; and disorderly worship services. The Pentecostal General Superintendent of the Assemblies of God USA, George O. Wood, acknowledged that there had been isolated cases of erroneous behavior and teaching in Pentecostal and charismatic churches, but said that the movement had made a great contribution to evangelization in the world.
