= George Gallup Jr. =

American statistician (1930–2011)

- Born: George Horace Gallup Jr. April 9, 1930; Evanston, Illinois, U.S.
- Died: November 21, 2011 (aged 81); Princeton, New Jersey
- Education: Princeton University
- Occupation: Pollster
- Spouse: Kingsley Hubby (m. 1959; died 2007)
- Children: Alison; Kingsley; George

George Horace Gallup Jr. (April 9, 1930 – November 21, 2011) was an American pollster, writer and executive at The Gallup Organization, which had been founded by his father, George Gallup. Gallup expanded the scope of the Gallup Poll to encompass a wider variety of topics, ranging from the outlook of American youth to religious beliefs. He also was an author, focusing on religion and spirituality in the United States. His works included The Saints Among Us, published in 1992, and The Next American Spirituality, published in 2002.

== Biography ==
Gallup was born in Evanston, Illinois, and graduated from the Lawrenceville School in 1948. He received a bachelor's degree in religion from Princeton University in 1953, and joined his father's polling company, The Gallup Organization a year later. He became co-chairmen of the company (with his brother Alex) upon their father's death in 1984, and worked there until his retirement in 2004.

Gallup was married to Kingsley Hubby, with whom he had three children. He was an Episcopalian, who once considered the ministry but instead served as an active layman.

He was diagnosed with liver cancer in 2010, and died in Princeton, New Jersey, on November 21, 2011, at the age of 81.
