= Jan Jacek Bruski =

Polish historian

Jan Jacek Bruski (born 1969) is a Polish historian. His specialization is a history of 20th Century.

In 1999 he gained his PhD (thesis: Centrum Państwowe Ukraińskiej Republiki Ludowej na wychodźstwie w latach 1919–1924. Monografia polityczna; supervisor: Michał Pułaski). In 2011 he passed his habilitation (thesis: Między prometeizmem a Realpolitik. II Rzeczpospolita wobec Ukrainy Sowieckiej, 1921–1926).

Bruski is working at the Jagiellonian University.

For his book Między prometeizmem a Realpolitik. II Rzeczpospolita wobec Ukrainy Sowieckiej 1921-1926 Bruski won the Henryk Wereszycki and Wacław Felczak Award.

== Books ==
- Petlurowcy. Centrum Państwowe Ukraińskiej Republiki Ludowej na wychodźstwie, 1919-1924, 1st ed. Kraków 2000, 2nd ed. Kraków 2004.
- Ukraina, 2nd ed., Warszawa 200, (with Andrzej Chojnowski).
- Miedzy prometeizmem a Realpolitik. II Rzeczpospolita wobec Ukrainy Sowieckiej 1921-1926, Kraków 2010.
