= Signs and wonders =

Experiences that are perceived to be miraculous

Signs and wonders are experiences that are perceived to be miraculous as being normative in the modern Christian experience, and is a phrase associated with groups that are a part of modern charismatic movements and Pentecostalism. This phrase is seen multiple times throughout the Bible to describe the activities of the early church, and is historically recorded as continuing, at least in practice, since the time of Christ. The phrase is primarily derived from Old and New Testament references and is now used in the Christian and mainstream press and in scholarly religious discourse to communicate a strong emphasis on recognizing perceived manifestations of the Holy Spirit in the contemporary lives of Christian believers. It also communicates a focus on the expectation that divine action would be experienced in the individual and corporate life of the modern Christian church, and a further insistence that followers actively seek the "gifts of the Spirit".

A further major emphasis of belief in signs and wonders is that the message of the Christian "good news" is communicated more effectively to those who do not believe it if accompanied by supernatural manifestations of the Holy Spirit, including such signs and wonders as miraculous healings and modern prophetic proclamations. This is the message of John Wimber's book Power Evangelism.

== Biblical origins ==
The origin of the phrase in the Old Testament is in Exodus 7:3, which describes God's actions to free the Israelites from being enslaved in Ancient Egypt. This phrase is used a total of 31 times in the Bible and it became popular again in modern history around the time of the Azusa Street Revival, when attendees claimed miraculous and supernatural events had happened.

== Critical responses ==
Critical responses were made by various writers including: J. Woodhouse, K. L. Sarles, K. M. Bond, and D. H. Shepherd, Later in the 1990s, the discussion was taken up by R. E. Jackson (addressing skeptics), and D. Williams.

Dr. Gene Kim argues that Biblical signs and wonders are only reserved for the nation of Israel, particularly the Jewish apostles, and that the Jews required a sign in order to confirm their apostleship (1 Corinthians 1:22, Acts 2:22, 2 Corinthians 12:12). He also argues that there was evidence of sign gifts fading in the latter days of the Apostle Paul's ministry because Paul’s miraculous healing powers were fading (Philippians 2:25-30, 1 Timothy 5:22-23, 2 Timothy 4:19-20), thus the signs and wonders have ceased after the death of all the apostles and are no longer continuing in the Church Age.

== Defense and reflection ==
The ongoing theological reflection accompanying the signs and wonders movement was evidenced by Fuller Theological Seminary's 1988 Symposium on Power Evangelism and C. Peter Wagner's book titled The Third Wave of the Holy Spirit. The study of the missiological implications of signs and wonders would continue on into the turn of the century.

Cessationists believe that spiritual gifts such as speaking in tongues, prophecy and healing ceased with the Apostolic Age, leading to a cessationism versus continuationism debate. The broader debate specifically over the signs and wonders movement and the present-day function of the manifestation gifts would continue into the 1990s.

== Power evangelism ==
The term power evangelism originally comes from Lonnie Frisbee's ministry but some of his harshest critics for heavy use of the Holy Spirit and the gifts of the Spirit came from the churches he helped found.

Power evangelism is a form of evangelism which relies on the supernatural power and gifts of the Holy Spirit, that is, on signs and wonders, to reach new converts and work through born again Christians. It is not the way most churches practice evangelism currently, which relies on an intellectual argument with the hope of salvation through logic and structured rituals.

== See also ==
- Acts of the Apostles
- Mark 16
- Miracle of the Sun
- Shabbat HaGadol
