= Association of Vineyard Churches =

Evangelical Christian denomination

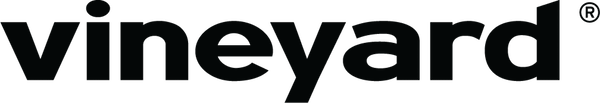
- Vineyard Wordmark
- Classification: Protestant
- Orientation: Neo-charismatic
- Theology: Evangelical
- Associations: Christian Churches Together
- Region: Claims 95 countries
- Origin: 1982
- Separated from: Calvary Chapel
- Separations: Toronto Blessing: Catch the Fire World
- Congregations: Claims 2,400
- Members: 220,941 in US (2010)
- Official website: www.vineyard.org

The Association of Vineyard Churches, also known as the Vineyard Movement, is an international neocharismatic evangelical Christian association of churches.

The Vineyard Movement is rooted in the charismatic renewal and historic evangelicalism. Instead of the mainstream charismatic label, however, the movement has preferred the term Empowered Evangelicals (a term coined by Rich Nathan and Ken Wilson in their book of the same name) to reflect their roots in traditional evangelicalism as opposed to classical Pentecostalism. Members also sometimes describe themselves as the "radical middle" between evangelicals and Pentecostals, which is a reference to the book The Quest for the Radical Middle, a historical survey of the Vineyard by Bill Jackson.

It has been associated with the "Signs and Wonders" movement, the Toronto blessing, the Kansas City Prophets and a particular style of Christian worship music.

The Vineyard operates a publishing house, Vineyard International Publishing.

== History ==
The Vineyard has its origins in the founding of a Calvary Chapel church by Kenn Gulliksen and his wife Joanie, members of Calvary Chapel Costa Mesa, in 1974, in Los Angeles in the United States. In early 1975, thirteen groups met at the Beverly Hills Women's club. These Bible studies, and others like them, were attended by many popular actors/actresses and musicians including Bob Dylan. Gulliksen's Vineyard had spun off sister churches. The church was renamed “Vineyard Fellowship”.

In 1977, John Wimber, an evangelical pastor and teacher on church growth, founded a Calvary Chapel in Yorba Linda, California. Wimber's teaching on healing and the ministry of the Holy Spirit led to conflict. In a meeting with Calvary Chapel leaders, it was suggested that Wimber's church stop using the Calvary name and affiliate with Gulliksen's Vineyard movement. In 1982, Wimber's church changed its name to the Anaheim Vineyard Christian Fellowship. Gulliksen turned over the churches under his oversight to Wimber, beginning his leadership of the Vineyard movement. Evangelist Lonnie Frisbee credits Gulliksen as founder of the Vineyard movement. In 1982, 8 churches founded the Association of Vineyard Churches.

Beginning in 1988, Wimber established relationships with leaders known for their prophetic ministry, such as Paul Cain, Bob Jones, and Mike Bickle who pastored Kansas City Fellowship, an independent church which would come under the Vineyard banner as Metro Vineyard (see Kansas City Prophets). For a time, these men had considerable influence on Wimber and the Vineyard—according to Jackson, Wimber's son was delivered from drug addiction through a prophetic word from Jones. However, there were those in the Vineyard who were skeptical, and Wimber himself became disillusioned over the restorationist teaching and failed prophecies of these men. Around 1991, Wimber began to distance himself from the prophetic movement, leading the Vineyard back to a church-planting direction, while Bickle's church withdrew and dropped the Vineyard label.

The Vineyard Movement suffered a visible leadership vacuum after Wimber's death on November 16, 1997. However, Todd Hunter, who served as National Coordinator since February 1994 and as acting Director of the Vineyard at the time of Wimber's death, became the National Director in January 1998 and served in that capacity until he resigned in May 2000. After Hunter's resignation, the National Board of Directors named Bert Waggoner of Sugar Land, Texas, as the new National Director. As of 2007, the Association of Vineyard Churches includes over 2400 churches around the world, and this number continues to grow due to a strong priority placed on church-planting within the Vineyard mission. In October, 2011, Phil Strout was selected by the National Board of Directors to succeed Waggoner as National Director in January 2013. He served until October, 2021 when Jay Pathak was installed as the National Director.

== Statistics ==
According to a census published by the association in 2022, it had 2,400 churches in 95 countries. The 2010 US Religious Census showed over 200,000 members in the United States.

== Beliefs and practices ==
=== Doctrinal statements ===
For most of the early life of the Vineyard Movement, Vineyard churches had no official statement of faith. This is not to be interpreted as an absence of a common belief structure; rather, the primary reasons for the absence of such a declaration were:

- the demonstrative teaching of John Wimber, who effectively set the tone and doctrinal beliefs of the movement
- a desire to reflect the "low-key", "low-pressure" environment of the church that encouraged people to "come as you are"
- specifically, de-emphasizing any atmosphere or actions that could be considered overtly dogmatic.

According to text in the official Vineyard Statement of Faith released in 1994, an effort to create a common Statement of Faith had been underway since 1983, but took 10+ years to complete because: "On one hand, we felt obliged to set forth our biblical and historically orthodox beliefs; on the other hand, we wanted to describe the values and priorities that make the Vineyard unique within the context of Evangelicalism."

=== LGBTQ+ position ===
In a 2020 letter to local church leaders, Vineyard Canada expressed its position that having a non-heterosexual orientation is not itself sinful, however the church does not allow the officiating of same sex marriages or licensing people in same sex marriages for pastoral ministry. This letter also distinguished gender identity from sexual orientation as its own theology and policy matter that requires further consideration.

== Branches ==
=== United States ===
The national headquarters of Vineyard USA is currently located in Stafford, Texas. Vineyard USA is divided into nine regions which are overseen by a Regional Leader. Regions are further divided into areas, which typically consist of a single state, except in a few cases where a cluster of churches is located closer to a state of another region. Each area is overseen by an Area Leader who reports to the Regional Leader. The purpose of both Area and Regional Leaders is to provide relational encouragement and spiritual care, as well as accountability, to churches and pastors. Both Area and Regional Leaders are active pastors of a local Vineyard church. Additionally, there are two Super Regional Leaders who support Regional and Area Leaders and help to train, lead, and provide spiritual care for local pastors. The central governing body of the Vineyard in the U.S. is known as the Executive Team, and includes the National Director. Currently, the President and National Director is Jay Pathak. All major strategic decisions, including theological and doctrinal statements, are made by the National Board. In 2018, Vineyard USA is estimated to have approximately 200,000 members in 600 churches.

In the United States, Vineyard is nondenominational and evangelical.

=== Denmark ===
As of December 2022, there are seven Vineyard churches in Denmark. Those are located in Copenhagen, Aarhus, Odense, Roskilde, Aalborg, Rønne (Bornholm), and Helsingør.

== Vineyard Worship ==

Vineyard Worship is a record label created and used by the Association of Vineyard Churches. The organization uses it to release worship albums. A UK branch of the record label exists, called Vineyard Records. Its musicians include Carl Tuttle, Samuel Lane, Brenton Brown,the late Brian Doerksen, David Ruis, Cindy Rethmeier, Scott Underwood, Andy Park, Kevin Prosch, Johanna Blanding-Koskinen, Anabeth Morgan, Tim Brown, Joshua Miller, Tina Colón Williams, Kyle Howard, Casey Corum, Ryan Delmore, Darren and Jessie Clarke, Nigel Briggs, Nigel Hemming, Jeremy Riddle, Kathryn Scott, and others.

=== History ===
Vineyard Music was developed by the Vineyard church in 1985. The church began to write its own worship songs, so John Wimber founded Mercy Records. This later became Vineyard Worship.

=== Early discography ===
- Worship Songs Of The Vineyard 1: Hosanna (1985)
- Worship Songs Of The Vineyard 2: You Are Here (1985)
- Worship Songs Of The Vineyard 3: Come Holy Spirit
- Worship Songs Of The Vineyard 4: Glory (1986)
- Worship Songs Of The Vineyard 5: Draw Me Closer (1988)
- Worship Songs Of The Vineyard 6: We Welcome You (1989)
- Worship Songs Of The Vineyard 7: No One but You (1989)
- Worship Songs Of The Vineyard 8: Give Him Praise (1990)
- Worship Songs Of The Vineyard 9: I Want to Know You (1990)
- Worship Songs Of The Vineyard 10: Refiner's Fire (1991)
- Worship Songs Of The Vineyard 11: Bring Your Kingdom (1992)
- Worship Songs Of The Vineyard 12: Lord Over All (1993)
- Hungry (1999)

== Controversies ==
=== Healing on the Streets ===
A leader within the Causeway Coast Vineyard, in Northern Ireland, Mark Marx, started a branch of the church called 'Healing on the Streets'. This organisation made promises to cure medical conditions through faith healing, first on the streets of Coleraine and then training other churches. These claims—including the claim they could heal cancer—have been challenged by the Advertising Standards Authority (ASA) who concluded that the claims were "misleading". This led to media stories around the Bath group, and the Nottingham group.

The Evangelical Alliance policy arm is led by Peter Lynas, who is also Chair of the Causeway Coast Vineyard board. Evangelical Alliance supported Mark Marx organisations and believes the regulations should not apply to the Healing on the Streets activities.

Mark Marx and Causeway Coast Vineyard founder Alan Scott have now moved together to Dwelling Place, California.

=== Causeway Coast Vineyard ===
The founder and trustees of the Causeway Coast Vineyard in Northern Ireland have been the subject of a number of internal and external investigations. Founder Alan Scott has been accused of having a messiah complex, and in 2023 several of his family members had to resign from leadership positions in the church following historic allegations of spiritual abuse.

The church's founders, Alan and Kathryn Scott, had left and moved to Anaheim Vineyard, California, in 2018. Before Alan and Kathryn left, Kathryn's sister, Janet Young, along with her husband, Neil Young, were made joint senior pastors.

A prominent Theologian, Dr. Luke Martin, attended the church as a teenager. He has criticised Alan publicly and pointed out that there was no open recruitment between Alan and Kathryn Scott leaving Northern Ireland, and the appointment of their family members Neil and Janet Young. Dr. Martin also noted that neither Neil and Janet had any theological qualifications.

After Alan and Kathryn's departure, reports started to emerge that Alan had been an abusive leader in Northern Ireland. The trustees of the church eventually commissioned an independent report. In this, respondents alleged that Alan Scott had appeared "all knowing" and that he had told them God would tell him if anybody spoke about him, even in their own homes, and that he knew people's sin by looking at them.

Neil and Janet Young resigned in 2023 as they could not support the findings of the trustee's independent report against their family members.

At the same time, in California, Anaheim Vineyard took Alan to court for fraud due to his decision to take the Anaheim church and its $62 million worth of assets out of the Vineyard movement. The Vineyard movement alleged that Alan had promised not to do this during the recruitment process, and they alleged he had been fraudulent in this promise.

Alan renamed the now independent Anaheim church 'Dwelling Place', where he remains as pastor. Similar concerns have continued at Dwelling Place under Scott, and in 2024 their worship leader was prohibited from attending a Christian conference following allegations of spiritual abuse while under Alan Scott's leadership at Dwelling Place.

In September 2024, the Charity Commission for Northern Ireland stepped in and have decided to run another investigation into the Causeway Coast Vineyard. The focus of this new probe is around the church's governance arrangements and its response to the allegations made against Alan and Kathryn Scott.

Like the senior leadership of the church, the trustee board is dominated by one family—the Lynas family—and their spouses. The Lynas family are one the wealthiest in the area, who own a major food distribution operation. The Chairperson, Peter Lynas, also works for Evangelical Alliance, a controversial lobby group who have been criticised for their conservative stance on a range of issues.^{,}

=== The Toronto Blessing ===
In January 1994, the Toronto Airport Vineyard Church, a member of the association, experienced an outbreak of physical manifestations (such as laughter, weeping, and shaking) that it claimed were the work of the Holy Spirit. These events continued for many months and became known as the Toronto Blessing. Large numbers of Christians from numerous countries visited the church to experience the phenomena and take them back to their home congregations. The "blessing" received considerable publicity and proved highly controversial. Some Christian leaders disputed the church's assertion that the manifestations were divine in origin. A leading critic was Hank Hanegraaff who wrote a book, Counterfeit Revival, which charged the church with promoting heresy. However, other Christian leaders endorsed the "blessing" as a genuine work of God. In December 1995, the Toronto church was removed from membership in the Association of Vineyard Churches for placing excessive emphasis on the manifestations and losing focus on the Bible. The church then changed its name to Toronto Airport Christian Fellowship, and later to Catch The Fire Toronto.

=== Steve Morgan ===
Steve Morgan had originally planted Vineyard Community Church of Carbondale, Illinois, in 1995 after hearing John Wimber speak at a conference. Steve Morgan's qualifications as a pastor have been questioned because of his arrest in 1987 for allegedly committing aggravated criminal sodomy against a teenager in November, 1986, while he was a youth pastor within the RLDS. Former Vineyard officials who had contact with Steve Morgan during the time of his ordination have denied knowledge of Steve Morgan's arrest.

Morgan broke away from the Vineyard denomination in 2006 to form The Network, along with the Vineyard Community Church of Carbondale, Illinois, and several other midwest Vineyard churches.

=== Sexual abuse allegations ===
Vineyard USA was accused of numerous allegations of sexual misconduct in their churches. In 2022, they began working with Guidepost Solutions to conduct an institutional assessment and in 2023 to create a hotline for congregants to report suspected abuse and misconduct. Vineyard USA maintains they are committed to accountability and working on safeguarding their churches, but many have criticized their past and current handling of sexual abuse allegations. Christian journalism outlet, The Roys Report, has investigated and reported on numerous stories of abuse and misconduct at Vineyard USA churches.

==== California ====
In June 2025, The Dwelling Place Anaheim (previously Vineyard Anaheim), Vineyard USA, and Ryan Dozie were served with a civil lawsuit claiming that the church covered up the sexual abuse of a minor by Ryan Dozie, for years.

In October 2025, another lawsuit was filed, also claiming the church failed to protect another minor from sexual abuse.

==== Ohio ====
In 2011, Vineyard Church of Columbus, Vineyard USA, and Vineyard Columbus pastor, Steve Robbins were sued for sexual abuse of Jane Doe while she sought counseling from Steve Robbins. Jane Doe alleged the abuse occurred from late August to November 2010. In 2012, Steve Robbins was welcomed back to the church by the senior pastor, Rich Nathan, stating that he had "fully repented".

Vineyard Church of Columbus released a webpage in 2023, detailing that they received a verbal report in 2022 about sexual misconduct by a Vineyard Columbus staff member. The page included a timeline of the reported misconduct, ensuing investigation, and conclusion. The church maintained "the investigation was unable to confirm the specific allegation, nor did it uncover any pattern of harassment or misconduct."

In 2022, a woman came forward publicly alleging sexual assault in a Columbus Vineyard church from 2016. The alleged victim proceeded to release several articles detailing her interaction with the local church and Vineyard USA at large, including allegations that they attempted to censor her story of the reported incident.

==== Minnesota ====
In 2024, a former Duluth Vineyard Church pastor, Jackson Gatlin, plead guilty following charges of criminal sexual misconduct of minors between the years of 2007-2010. Jackson's parents, Michael and Brenda Gatlin, as well as Vineyard USA and the Duluth Vineyard, where Michael and Brenda pastored were accused of covering up Jackson's abuse. The Duluth Vineyard, Vineyard USA, Jackson Gatlin, and Michael and Brenda Gatlin were served with 10 civil lawsuits. The plaintiffs were represented by attorney Spencer Kuvin, stating, "The culture of fear and spiritual manipulation and abuse that was occurring at the Vineyard Church, on both a local and national level, was the primary cause behind these incidents."

== See also ==
- Believers' Church

== Sources ==
- Freudenberg, Maren (2019). "Dynamics and Stability in Globally Expanding Charismatic Religions: The Case of the Vineyard Movement in Germany, Austria, andSwitzerland". Entangled Religions. 8. doi:10.46586/er.8.2019.8353.
- Luhrmann, T. L. (2012). When God Talks Back: Understanding the American Evangelical Relationship with God. Alfred A. Knopf. ISBN 978-0307264794.
