= John Wimber =

American pastor and author (1934–1997)

- Born: John Richard Wimber; February 25, 1934; Kirksville, Missouri, U.S.
- Died: November 17, 1997 (aged 63); Santa Ana, California, U.S.
- Occupations: Christian author and pastor

John Richard Wimber (February 25, 1934 – November 17, 1997) was an American pastor, Christian author and musician. Initially ordained as a Quaker minister, he became an early, pioneering pastor of charismatic congregations, and a popular thought leader in modern Christian publications on the third person of the Christian Trinity, the Holy Spirit, and the Holy Spirit's action in modern churches through miraculous phenomena referred to as miracles, or signs and wonders. Wimber was a founding leader of the Vineyard Movement, a Christian movement that Kenn Gulliksen began in the United States and that later became a wider denomination.

== Early life ==
John Richard Wimber was born on February 25, 1934, in Kirksville, Missouri, to Basil and Genevieve Estelynn (Martin) Wimber. He grew up outside of a religious or faith-based belief system until he became a Christian at the age of 29. Wimber was recognised as a talented musician, and he first played as a professional at the age of 15 at the Dixie Castle in Orange, California. Four years later, in 1953, Wimber won a first prize at the Lighthouse International Jazz Festival.

Wimber was a talented keyboardist, saxophonist, and vocalist. He was a pianist and singer in The Paramours group, later known as The Righteous Brothers, from 1962 to 1963, as well as a manager for The Righteous Brothers during this period. This five-member band preceded Bobby Hatfield and Bill Medley's eventual induction into the Rock and Roll Hall of Fame.

He converted to Christianity in 1963, immediately enrolled in Azusa Pacific College, and majored in Biblical Studies. Upon graduating he was ordained as a Quaker minister. He then took a pastoral position with the Yorba Linda Friends Church.

== Career ==
By 1970, Wimber was leading 11 different Bible study groups that involved more than 500 people. He was the Founding Director of the Department of Church Growth at the Charles E. Fuller Institute of Evangelism and Church Growth from 1974 to 1978, which was founded by the Fuller Theological Seminary and the Fuller Evangelistic Association. He was also on staff at Yorba Linda Friends Church.

Wimber eventually left the Quaker denomination after being discouraged from operating in the gifts of the Spirit. He formed a house church that would eventually grow into the Vineyard Christian Fellowship (VCF) of Anaheim in 1977.

== Religious views and theology ==
Wimber strongly espoused Kingdom theology, and this approach to the charismatic differed from many of his peers and predecessors. Wimber's embrace of this new approach led a friend, C. Peter Wagner, to coin the phrase, "The Third Wave of the Holy Spirit" to describe the concept he taught. The Third Wave differed from classic Pentecostalism and the Charismatic movement, foremost, in their approach to speaking in tongues. Whereas the previous groups had emphasized the gift of tongues as the only evidence for the baptism of the Holy Spirit, Wimber and those he influenced emphasized that this was just one of the many spiritual gifts available to believers, as taught in the Bible (1 Corinthians 12:7-10). His teaching revolutionized what was a major theological stumbling block to some mainstream Evangelicals, and normalized the demonstration of "signs and wonders" in current times. Wimber held influence with a number of them, most famously Jack Deere, C. Peter Wagner, and Wayne Grudem.

Services led by Wimber often included activities, described as Holy Spirit manifestations, where congregants appeared to be drunk, dazed, or uncoordinated. But in the mid-1990s he led the Vineyard movement to split from the Toronto Blessing church primarily on the issue of bizarre manifestations and the church's extreme latitude for them.

=== Gender roles ===
Wimber held a complementarian view of gender roles, however his theology on various issues changed throughout the years. He believed firmly in who God was calling and anointing. In 2006, his daughter-in-law, Christy Wimber planted and led a Vineyard Church in Yorba Linda for eleven years. It was Carol Wimber who did the installation. This view believes the Bible to teach that a husband is called to lovingly lead, protect and provide for his wife and family, and that the wife should joyfully and intelligently affirm and submit to her husband's leadership. Complementarians also believe the Bible to teach that men are to bear primary responsibility to lead the church and that therefore only men should be elders. Wimber leaned towards complementarian. "In spite of his complementarian convictions, Wimber permitted at least two notable exceptions: both Jackie Pullinger (Hong Kong) and Ann Watson (England) served as the senior leaders of their respective congregations (although I should mention that Watson viewed her role as exceptional, given the premature death of her husband, and not a position to which women in ordinary circumstances should aspire)."

=== Authenticity ===
Wimber was very outspoken about maintaining authenticity and doing nothing for religious effect. He was dissatisfied with the way some services were run, was "angry with what appeared to be the manipulation of people for the material gains of the faith healer," "pushing people over and calling it the power of God," and accepting money for healing ministry. Wimber was not against manifestations in a service as long as they were real actions of God and not "fleshly and brought out by some sort of display, or promoted by somebody on stage"

=== Wider impact and other teachings ===
Wimber's teaching influenced many Christians, both inside and out of the Vineyard movement. One of the key foundations of his teaching was intimacy with God, rather than religious habit and discipline. Another characteristic is in the area of teaching, which emphasized preaching extensively from the gospels and using Jesus as the model for Christian believers. Wimber also had a deep desire to be active in helping the poor.

He strongly emphasized signs and wonders, which he referred to as "Doin' the Stuff", the priesthood of every believer and that every Christian has the ability to prophesy and heal the sick. While this is not a new concept, Wimber was a key figure in the introduction of the concept that praying for the sick (or anything else) should not be reserved for special healing services, but should take place at every Church service, and should be practised on the streets by every believer. As a result, many churches have prayer time after the sermon. The Vineyard worship style has also had a wide influence on the church.

Wimber's teaching has had a significant influence on other Charismatic leaders, such as Mike Bickle, Terry Virgo, Randy Clark, John Arnott, Bill Johnson, John Paul Jackson, Sandy Millar, David Pytches and Christy Wimber.

Wimber's theology and methods have been challenged by cessationist Christians. Their criticism is mainly concerned with his embrace of Kingdom theology.

Christy Wimber was handed the responsibility of handling all of John Wimber's teachings and writings from his passing in 1997 up until 2018. During those years she produced countless teachings and writings from Wimber's years of ministry work. She also documented the Vineyard as a Movement beginning with back to Our Roots series which was completed in 2008. Also, in the 2008 she began working with Regent University in Virginia for twelve years and opened the library in 2018 which is when she then concluded her service to the Wimber legacy with the opening of the Wimber Library.

== Declining health and death ==
In 1983 and 1984, Wimber said, "I had suffered minor chest pains every four or five months. I suspected they had something to do with my heart but did nothing about them. Nobody, not even Carol, my wife, knew about my condition." In October 1985 while in England he was very tired and had chest pains. His wife insisted he get tested. "I had what doctors later suspected were a series of coronary attacks." The next month his cardiologist confirmed he had a damaged heart and told him that his weight and schedule put him at risk of imminent death. "In 1985 I was away from home for over forty weeks." "All my life," Wimber confessed, "I have been a compulsive person, always working and eating more than I should." In 1986 he had a heart attack.

In 1993 Wimber was diagnosed with sinus cancer. He had successful radiation treatment which lasted a year, but said "at the time I weighed 280 pounds." In 1995 he had a stroke. In 1997 he had triple-bypass heart surgery. His mental faculties were declining and later that same year Wimber fell in his home and hit his head. This caused a massive brain hemorrhage, from which he died on November 17, 1997, at Western Medical Center in Santa Ana, California. He was 63 years old.

Wimber's health problems had challenged his theology and experience. After teaching on healing, praying for the sick, and seeing people healed, he openly admitted: "Not only have I suffered physically with health problems, but I also spent a great deal of time struggling with depression during my battle with cancer." He also commented, "Sometimes our experiences don't fit with our understanding of what the Bible teaches. On the one hand, we know that God is sovereign and that he sent Jesus to commission us to pray for and heal the sick. On the other hand, we know from experience that healing does not always occur. Why would God command us to heal the sick and then choose not to back up our act (so to speak) by not healing the person for whom we pray? This can be downright discouraging, as I learned years ago in my own congregation when I began to teach on healing. It was nine months before we saw the first person healed. The temptation was to withdraw from practicing Christ's commands or, at the other extreme, to drum up a false bravado to convince God to do what we thought He ought to do."

== Published works ==
- Power Evangelism (co-author; Harper & Row, 1986) ISBN 0-34056127-0
- Power Healing (co-author; Harper & Row, 1986) ISBN 0-06069541-2
- Signs and Wonders and Church Growth (co-author; Harper & Row, 1988) ISBN 978-0-06069537-8
- Power Points: Your Action Plan to Hear God's Voice, Believe God's World, Seek the Father, Submit to Christ, Take Up the Cross, Depend on the Holy Spirit, Fulfill the Great Commission (co-author; HarperCollins, 1991) ISBN 978-0-06069539-2
- The Way In Is The Way On: Christy Wimber — John Wimber's Teachings and Writings on Life in Christ (Ampelon, 2006) ISBN 978-0-97488257-4
- Everyone Gets to Play Christy Wimber — Teachings and writing's of John Wimber (co-author; Ampelon, 2009) ISBN 978-0-98177057-4
- Pastoral Letters John Wimber and Derek Morphew - The last book that John wrote ISBN 979-8-6244-9432-9
