= Church of Canada =

Church of Canada may refer to:

- Religion in Canada
- Christianity in Canada
- United Church of Canada
