= Demographics of Regina, Saskatchewan =

The population within Regina, Saskatchewan's metropolitan area was 236,481 as of 2016 Canada Census with an annual growth rate of 2.4%.

== Summary ==
Canada census – Regina community profile

	2021
Population	226,404 (+5.3% from 2016)
Land area	178.81 km^{2} (69.04 sq mi)
Population density	1,266.2/km^{2} (3,279/sq mi)
Median age	37.6 (M: 36.8, F: 38.4)
Private dwellings	99,134 (total) 92,129 (occupied)
Median household income	$88,000

References: 2021

== Age structure ==
- 0–14 years: 20%
- 15–64 years: 67.5%
- 65 years and over: 12.5%

== Ethnicity ==
=== City of Regina ===
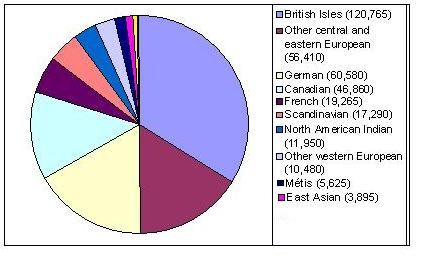
Ethnic configuration of Regina according to the 2001 census

Panethnic groups in the City of Regina (2001−2021)
Panethnic group	2021		2016		2011		2006		2001	
Panethnic group	Pop.	%	Pop.	%	Pop.	%	Pop.	%	Pop.	%
European (Note: Statistic includes all persons that did not make up part of a visible minority or an indigenous identity.)	142,440	63.85%	150,110	70.88%	149,225	78.65%	147,955	83.63%	150,515	85.71%
Indigenous	23,290	10.44%	20,925	9.88%	18,750	9.88%	16,535	9.35%	15,295	8.71%
South Asian	19,200	8.61%	12,330	5.82%	4,885	2.57%	1,945	1.1%	1,665	0.95%
Southeast Asian (Note: Statistic includes total responses of "Filipino" and "Southeast Asian" under visible minority section on census.)	15,525	6.96%	11,060	5.22%	6,635	3.5%	2,445	1.38%	2,175	1.24%
African	9,820	4.4%	6,330	2.99%	3,065	1.62%	2,125	1.2%	1,555	0.89%
East Asian (Note: Statistic includes total responses of "Chinese", "Korean", and "Japanese" under visible minority section on census.)	6,760	3.03%	6,430	3.04%	4,185	2.21%	3,825	2.16%	2,750	1.57%
Middle Eastern (Note: Statistic includes total responses of "West Asian" and "Arab" under visible minority section on census.)	2,920	1.31%	2,275	1.07%	1,060	0.56%	700	0.4%	475	0.27%
Latin American	1,410	0.63%	1,180	0.56%	1,270	0.67%	955	0.54%	770	0.44%
Other/Multiracial (Note: Statistic includes total responses of "Visible minority, n.i.e." and "Multiple visible minorities" under visible minority section on census.)	1,700	0.76%	1,140	0.54%	670	0.35%	425	0.24%	400	0.23%
Total responses	223,070	98.53%	211,780	98.45%	189,740	98.26%	176,910	98.7%	175,605	98.53%
Total population	226,404	100%	215,106	100%	193,100	100%	179,246	100%	178,225	100%
Note: Totals greater than 100% due to multiple origin responses

=== Metro Regina ===
Largest non-European panethnic group in Regina CMA by census tracts based on the 2021 census

Panethnic groups in Metro Regina (2001−2021)
Panethnic group	2021		2016		2011		2006		2001	
Panethnic group	Pop.	%	Pop.	%	Pop.	%	Pop.	%	Pop.	%
European (Note: 2001-2016: Statistic includes all persons that did not make up part of a visible minority or an indigenous identity. 2021: Statistic includes all persons belonging to the non-indigenous and non-visible minority “White” population group.)	162,595	66.38%	169,735	72.97%	165,475	79.86%	162,720	84.56%	164,455	86.55%
Indigenous	24,520	10.01%	21,650	9.31%	19,785	9.55%	17,105	8.89%	15,685	8.25%
South Asian	19,495	7.96%	12,410	5.33%	4,900	2.36%	1,975	1.03%	1,660	0.87%
Southeast Asian	15,670	6.4%	11,145	4.79%	6,655	3.21%	2,490	1.29%	2,195	1.16%
African	9,965	4.07%	6,470	2.78%	3,110	1.5%	2,175	1.13%	1,580	0.83%
East Asian	6,820	2.78%	6,530	2.81%	4,260	2.06%	3,840	2%	2,760	1.45%
Middle Eastern	2,930	1.2%	2,290	0.98%	1,060	0.51%	700	0.36%	475	0.25%
Latin American	1,430	0.58%	1,195	0.51%	1,290	0.62%	960	0.5%	800	0.42%
Other/Multiracial	1,765	0.72%	1,190	0.51%	670	0.32%	455	0.24%	400	0.21%
Total responses	244,950	98.29%	232,615	98.37%	207,215	98.41%	192,435	98.7%	190,020	98.56%
Total population	249,217	100%	236,481	100%	210,556	100%	194,971	100%	192,800	100%
Note: Totals greater than 100% due to multiple origin responses

== Language ==
=== Metro Regina ===
The question on knowledge of languages allows for multiple responses. The following figures are from the 2021 Canadian Census, and lists languages that were selected by at least 500 respondents.

Knowledge of Languages in Metro Regina
Language	2021	
Language	Pop.	%
English	241,880	98.75%
French	14,655	5.98%
Tagalog	9,800	4%
Hindi	7,750	3.16%
Punjabi	6,065	2.48%
Mandarin	4,165	1.7%
Urdu	3,975	1.62%
Gujarati	3,355	1.37%
Spanish	2,795	1.14%
Arabic	2,690	1.1%
Vietnamese	2,065	0.84%
German	1,905	0.78%
Bengali	1,840	0.75%
Ukrainian	1,715	0.7%
Russian	1,665	0.68%
Cantonese	1,570	0.64%
Yoruba	1,300	0.53%
Ilocano	1,065	0.43%
Malayalam	905	0.37%
Greek	785	0.32%
Cree	765	0.31%
Tigrigna	665	0.27%
Korean	630	0.26%
Serbo-Croatian	625	0.26%
Cebuano	615	0.25%
Somali	615	0.25%
Italian	585	0.24%
Igbo	530	0.22%
Total; Responses	244,950	98.29%
Total; Population	249,217	100%

== Religion ==
=== City of Regina ===
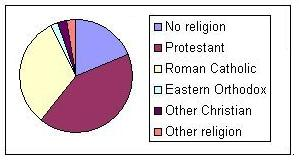
Religious affiliation in Regina according to the 2006 census

- Protestant: 41.5%
- Roman Catholic: 32.3%
- No religion: 19.0%
- Eastern Orthodox: 1.8%
- Other Christian: 2.9%
- Other religion: 2.5%

=== Metro Regina ===
Largest non-Christian in Regina CMA by census tract based on the 2021 census

Religious groups in Metro Regina (1981−2021)
Religious group	2021		2011		2001		1991		1981	
Religious group	Pop.	%	Pop.	%	Pop.	%	Pop.	%	Pop.	%
Christianity	130,610	53.32%	142,100	68.58%	150,370	79.13%	160,185	84.56%	147,200	90.65%
Irreligion	87,835	35.86%	55,510	26.79%	35,175	18.51%	25,810	13.62%	13,055	8.04%
Islam	10,460	4.27%	3,545	1.71%	770	0.41%	560	0.3%	300	0.18%
Hinduism	6,590	2.69%	1,560	0.75%	620	0.33%	725	0.38%	375	0.23%
Sikhism	4,450	1.82%	930	0.45%	290	0.15%	205	0.11%	255	0.16%
Buddhism	1,790	0.73%	1,660	0.8%	1,140	0.6%	635	0.34%	295	0.18%
Indigenous spirituality	1,215	0.5%	885	0.43%	—N/a	—N/a	—N/a	—N/a	—N/a	—N/a
Judaism	365	0.15%	345	0.17%	370	0.19%	485	0.26%	710	0.44%
Other	1,625	0.66%	685	0.33%	1,285	0.68%	840	0.44%	185	0.11%
Total responses	244,950	98.29%	207,215	98.41%	190,020	98.56%	189,440	98.83%	162,385	98.83%
Total population	249,217	100%	210,556	100%	192,800	100%	191,692	100%	164,313	100%
