= Sonia Sikka =

Canadian philosopher

Education
- Education: University of York (PhD), University of Victoria (BA)

Philosophical work
- Era: Contemporary philosophy
- Region: Western philosophy
- Institutions: University of Ottawa
- Main interests: Political philosophy, philosophy of religion, multiculturalism, German philosophy

Sonia Sikka is a Canadian philosopher and Professor of Philosophy at the University of Ottawa. Her research focuses on German philosophy (especially Heidegger and Herder), multiculturalism, secularism, religion, race, and morality.

== Books ==
- Heidegger, Morality and Politics: Questioning the Shepherd of Being, Cambridge University Press, 2017
- Herder on Humanity and Cultural Difference: Enlightened Relativism, Cambridge University Press, 2011
- Forms of Transcendence: Heidegger and Medieval Mystical Theology, SUNY Press, 1997
- Constructions of Self and Other in Yoga, Travel, and Tourism: A Journey to Elsewhere, edited with Lori G. Beaman, Palgrave Macmillan, 2016
- Living with Religious Diversity, edited with Bindu Puri and Lori G. Beaman, Routledge, 2015
- Multiculturalism and Religious Identity: Canada and India, edited with Lori G. Beaman, McGill-Queen's University Press, 2014
