= Lori G. Beaman =

Canadian academic

Lori G. Beaman FRSC
- Born: 1963 (age 62–63)
- Other names: Lori Gail Beaman; Lori Gail Beaman-Hall

Academic background
- Education: University of New Brunswick
- Thesis: Feminist Practice, Evangelical Worldview (1996)

Academic work
- Discipline: Religious studies; sociology
- Sub-discipline: Sociology of religion
- Institutions: University of Lethbridge; Concordia University; University of Ottawa
- Main interests: Religious diversity; religion in Canada; critical legal studies; social and cultural theory; secularism; feminism
- Notable ideas: Deep equality; will to religion

Lori Gail Beaman FRSC (born 1963) is a Canadian academic. She is a professor in the Department of Classics and Religious Studies of the University of Ottawa, and holder of the Canada Research Chair in Religious Diversity and Social Change. She has published work on religious diversity, religious freedom, and the intersections of religion and law. She was made a fellow of the Academy of the Arts and Humanities of the Royal Society of Canada in 2015, received an Insight Award from the Social Sciences and Humanities Research Council in 2017 and received an honorary doctorate from Uppsala University in 2018.

== Education ==
Beaman earned her Bachelor of Arts degree in philosophy (1985), Bachelor of Laws degree (1987), Master of Arts degree in sociology (1992), and Doctor of Philosophy degree in sociology (1996) at the University of New Brunswick in Fredericton, New Brunswick, Canada. She was admitted to the Law Society of New Brunswick in 1988 and practiced law for five years before her postgraduate studies.

== Career ==
Beaman has held faculty positions at Concordia University in Montreal, Quebec and The University of Lethbridge, Lethbridge, Alberta. She is the Canada Research Chair in Religious Diversity and Social Change and full professor in the Department of Classics and Religious Studies at the University of Ottawa. She teaches Religion and Law, Theory and Method, and Religion in Contemporary Canada.

From 2009 to 2016 Beaman headed the Religion and Diversity Project, a collaborative research project involving almost forty researchers in five countries, financed by the Social Sciences and Humanities Research Council and based at the University of Ottawa. She currently directs the Nonreligion in a Complex Future (NCF) project, which aims to identify the social impact of the increase of nonreligion. The project is international and multidisciplinary, with twenty one researchers in ten countries.

== Religion and law ==
Beaman has written extensively on religious diversity and the intersections of religion and law. She has also written about polygamy and how law frames certain types of family structures. Her commentaries on government responses to religion in the public sphere (such as the proposed Charter of Quebec Values) and the complexities of religious freedom have appeared on the academic blog The Immanent Frame and in the Tony Blair Faith Foundation's Global Perspectives Series, where she emphasized the need for positive narratives and more nuanced understandings of intra-religious diversity.

== Deep equality ==
In 2015, the Royal Society of Canada acknowledged Beaman's contributions to the study of religious diversity in Canada and her research on deep equality.

== Recognition ==
- 2006–present Canada Research Chair in the Contextualization of Religion in a Diverse Canada
- 2010 - 2017 Social Sciences and Humanities Research Council (SSHRC) $2.5-million grant, Major Collaborative Research Initiatives. Project Title: Religious Diversity and Its Limits: Moving Beyond Tolerance and Accommodation
- 2015 Fellow of the Royal Society of Canada, Academy of the Arts and Humanities
- 2017 Social Sciences and Humanities Research Council (SSHRC) Insight Award Nominee
- 2018 Canadian Society for the Study of Religion / Société Canadienne pour l'Étude de la Religion 2018 Book Prize Winner for Deep Equality in an Era of Religious Diversity
- 2018 Honorary Doctorate from Uppsala University.

== Selected publications ==
=== Books (sole author) ===
- The Transition of Religion to Culture in Law and Public Discourse. London: Routledge. 2020.
- Deep Equality in an Era of Religious Diversity. Oxford: Oxford University Press. 2017.
- Defining Harm: Religious Freedom and the Limits of the Law. 2008. Vancouver: University of British Columbia Press.
- Shared Beliefs, Different Lives: Women’s Identities in Evangelical Context. 1999. Saint Louis: Chalice Press.

=== Books (co-authored) ===
- Exploring Gender in Canada: A Multidimensional Approach. 2007. Co-authored with Beverly Matthews. Toronto: Prentice Hall.

=== Book series (co-edited) ===
- International Studies in Religion and Society. 2007–present. Co-edited with Peter Beyer. Leiden: Brill.
- Boundaries of Religious Freedom: Regulating Religion in Diverse Societies. 2015–present. Co-edited with Anna Halafoff and Lene Kühle. Cham: Springer.

=== Edited volumes ===
- Constructions of Self and Other in Yoga, Travel and Tourism: A Journey to Elsewhere. 2016. Edited by Lori G. Beaman and Sonia Sikka.
- Living with Religious Diversity. 2016. Edited by Sonia Sikka, Bindu Puri and Lori G. Beaman. New Delhi: Routledge India.
- Issues in Religion and Education, Whose Religion? 2015. Edited by Lori G. Beaman and Leo Van Arragon. Leiden: Brill.
- Atheist Identities: Spaces and Social Contexts. 2015. Edited by Lori G. Beaman and Steven Tomlins. Cham: Springer.
- Multiculturalism and Religious Identity: Canada and India. 2014. Edited by Sonia Sikka and Lori G. Beaman. Montreal: McGill-Queen's University Press.
- Religion in the Public Sphere: Canadian Case Studies. 2014. Edited by Solange Lefebvre and Lori G. Beaman. Toronto: University of Toronto Press.
- Polygamy’s Rights and Wrongs: Perspectives on Harm, Family, and Law. 2013 Edited by Gillian Calder and Lori G. Beaman. Vancouver: University of British Columbia Press.
- Varieties of Religious Establishment. 2013. Edited by Winnifred Sullivan and Lori G. Beaman. Farnham: Ashgate.
- Reasonable Accommodation: Managing Religious Diversity. 2012. Vancouver: University of British Columbia Press.
- Religion and Diversity in Canada. 2008. Edited by Lori G. Beaman and Peter Beyer. Leiden: Brill Academic Press.
- Religion, Globalization and Culture. 2007. Edited by Peter Beyer and Lori G. Beaman. Leiden: Brill Academic Press.
- Religion and Canadian Society: Traditions, Transitions and Innovations. 2012. Toronto: Canadian Scholar's Press Inc.
- New Perspectives on Deviance: The Construction of Deviance in Everyday Life. 2000. Toronto: Prentice Hall.

=== Book chapters ===
- Namaste: The Perilous Journey of ‘Real’ Yoga, in Constructions of Self and Other in Yoga, Travel and Tourism: A Journey to Elsewhere, edited by Lori G. Beaman and Sonia Sikka. 2016.
- Opposing Polygamy: A Matter of Equality or Patriarchy? in Of Crime and Religion: Polygamy in Canadian Law, edited by Marie-Pierre Robert, David Kousssens and Stéphanie Bernatchez. Sherbrooke: Éditions Revue de droit de l’Université de Sherbrooke, 2014: 131–157.
- Labyrinth as Heterotopia: The Pilgrim's Creation of Space, in On the Road to Being There: Continuing the Pilgrimage-Tourism Dialogue, edited by William Swatos Jr. Leiden: Brill Academic Press, 2006: 83–103.

=== Journal articles ===
- Living Well Together in a (non)Religious Future: Contributions from the Sociology of Religion. Sociology of Religion, 78(1): 9-32.
- Deep Equality as an Alternative to Accommodation and Tolerance, Nordic Journal of Religion and Society 27(2): 89–111. 2014. Article
- Overdressed and Underexposed or Underdressed and Overexposed? Social Identities: Journal for the Study of Race, Nation and Culture, 19(6): 723–742. 2013
- The Will to Religion: Obligatory Religious Citizenship, Critical Research on Religion 1(2): 141–157. 2013.
- Battles over Symbols: The ‘Religion’ of the Minority Versus the ‘Culture’ of the Majority, Journal of Law and Religion 28(1): 67–104. 2012/3.
- Protéger les relations entre les sexes: La Commission Bouchard-Taylor et l’égalité des femmes, avec Solange Lefebvre, Revue Canadienne de recherché social, 2(1): 84–94. 2012.
- It was all slightly unreal’: What's Wrong with Tolerance and Accommodation in the Adjudication of Religious Freedom? Canadian Journal of Women and Law 23(2): 442–463. 2011.
- The Myth of Plurality, Diversity and Vigour: Constitutional Privilege of Protestantism in the United States and Canada, Journal for the Scientific Study of Religion 42(3): 311–325; and 341–346. 2003.
- Aboriginal Spirituality and the Legal Construction of Freedom of Religion, Journal of Church and State 44: 135–149. 2002.
- Molly Mormons, Mormon Feminists and Moderates: Religious Diversity and the Latter Day Saints Church, Sociology of Religion 62(1): 65–86. 2001.

== See also ==
- Agonism
- Heterotopia (space)
- Lived religion
- Religion in Canada
- Secular ethics
