= Religion in Canada =

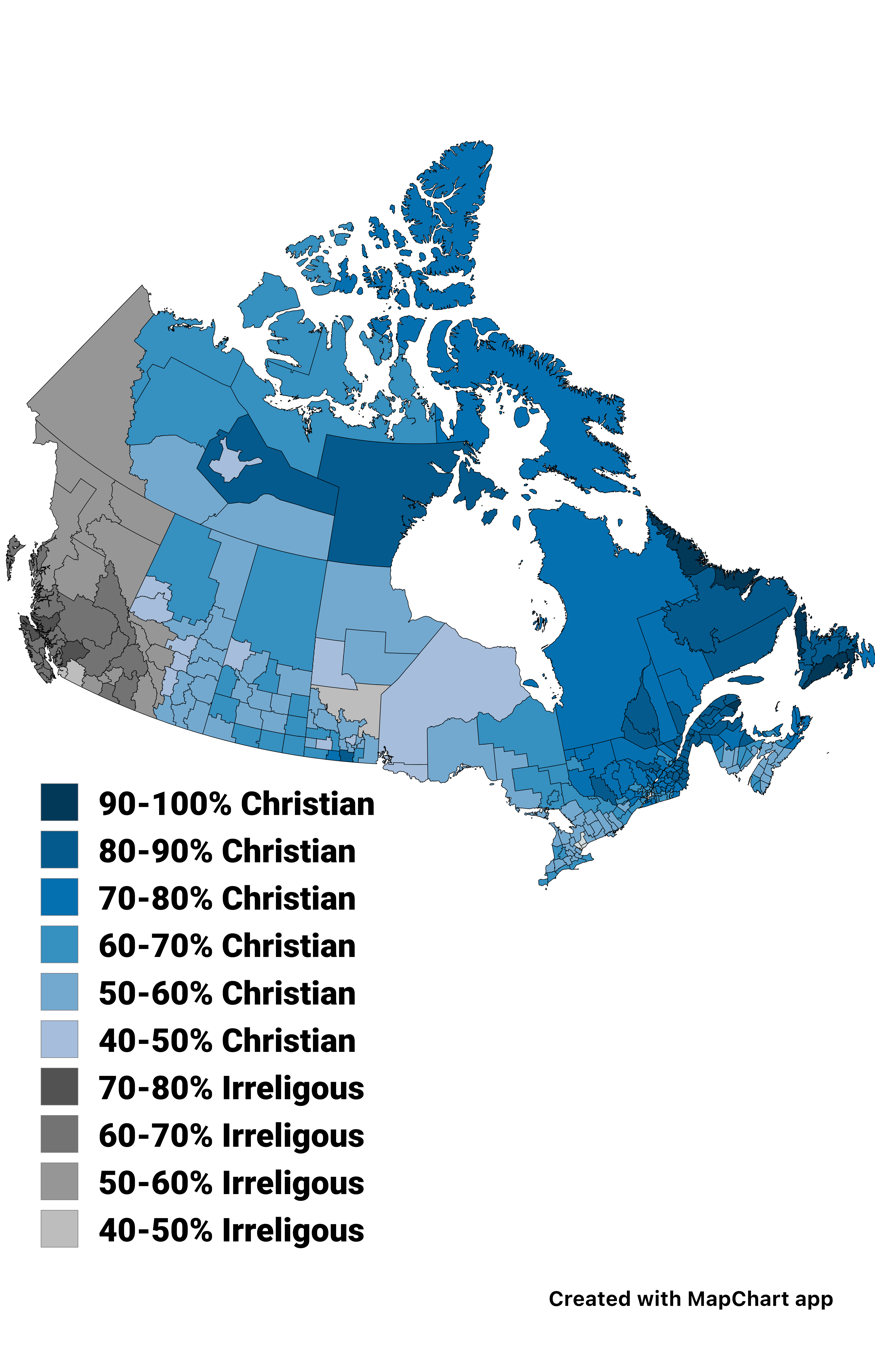
Population distribution of largest religious affiliation in Canada by census division, 2021 Census.

Religion in Canada encompasses a wide range of beliefs and customs that historically has been dominated by Christianity. The constitution of Canada refers to 'God'; however Canada has no official church and the government is officially committed to religious pluralism. Freedom of religion in Canada is a constitutionally protected right, allowing individuals to assemble and worship without limitation or interference. Rates of religious adherence have steadily decreased since the 1960s. After having once been central and integral to Canadian culture and daily life, Canada has become a post-Christian state. Although the majority of Canadians consider religion to be unimportant in their daily lives, they still believe in God. The practice of religion is generally considered a private matter throughout society and the state.

Before the European colonization, a wide diversity of Native religions and belief systems of the Indigenous peoples in Canada were largely animistic or shamanistic. The French colonization beginning in the 16th century established a Catholic French population in New France. During the colonial period, the French settled along the shores of the Saint Lawrence River, specifically Latin Church Catholics, including a number of Jesuits dedicated to converting indigenous peoples. These attempts reached a climax in the late 19th and early 20th centuries with forced integration through state-funded boarding schools run by both Catholics and Protestants that attempted to assimilate Indigenous children.

British colonization brought waves of Anglicans and other Protestants to Upper Canada, now Ontario. The settlement of the West brought significant Eastern Orthodox immigrants from Eastern Europe and Mormon and Pentecostal immigrants from the United States. The Jewish, Islamic, Jain, Sikh, Hindu, and Buddhist communities—although small—are as old as the nation itself.

According to the 2021 census, Christianity is the largest religion in Canada, with Catholics representing 29.9 percent of the population having the most adherents. Christians overall representing 53.3 percent of the population, (Note: Catholic Church (29.9%), United Church (3.3%), Anglican Church (3.1%), Eastern Orthodoxy (1.7%), Baptist (1.2%), Pentecostalism and other Charismatic (1.1%), Anabaptist (0.4), Jehovah's Witness (0.4), Latter Day Saints (0.2), Lutheran (0.9), Methodist and Wesleyan (Holiness) (0.3), Presbyterian (0.8), Reformed (0.2) (7.6%) simply identified as “Christians".) are followed by people reporting irreligion or having no religion at 34.6 percent. Other faiths include Islam (4.9 percent), Hinduism (2.3 percent), Sikhism (2.1 percent), Buddhism (1.0 percent), Judaism (0.9 percent), and Indigenous spirituality (0.2 percent). Canada has the second-largest national Sikh population, behind India.

== Religious pluralism ==
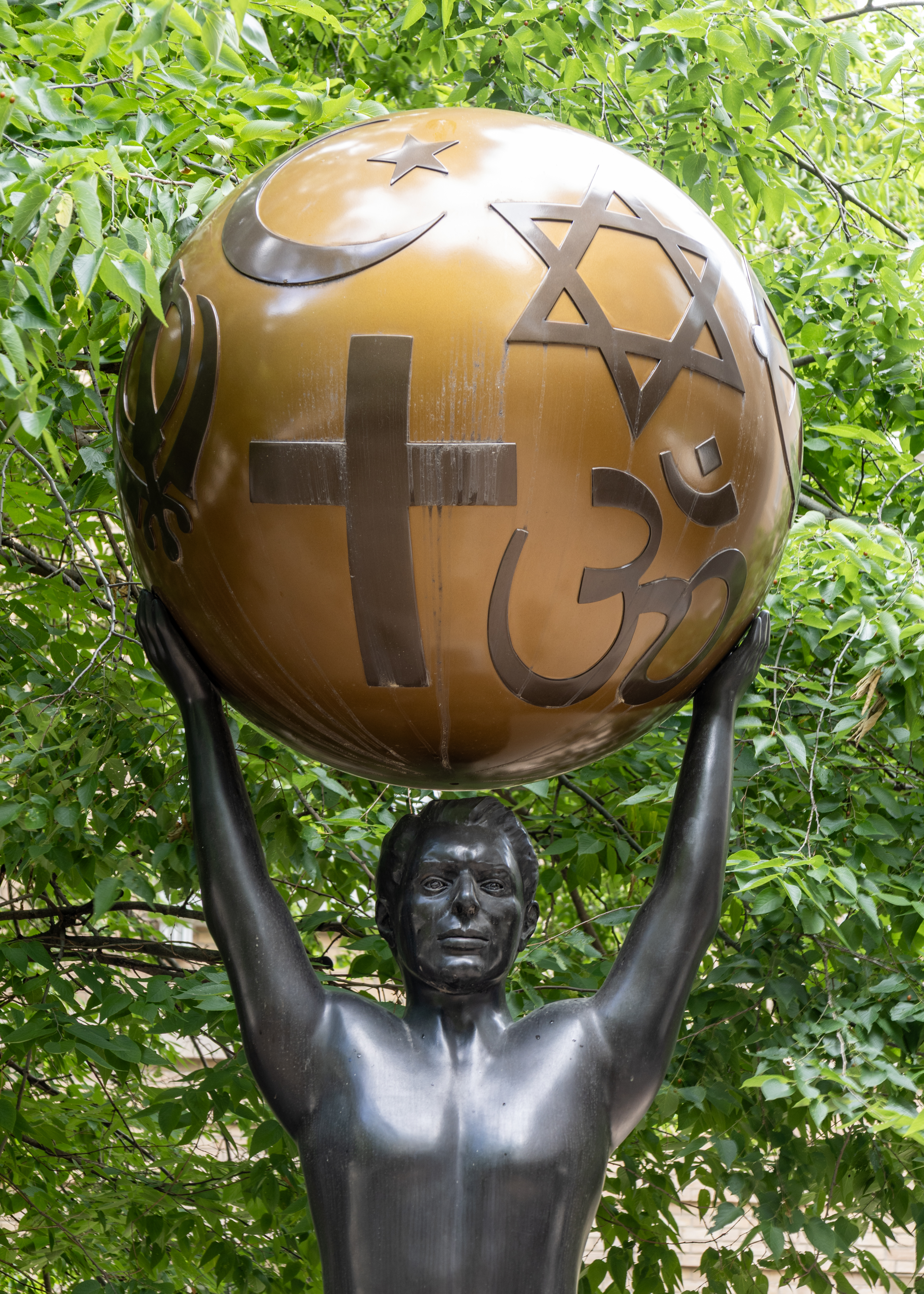
Freedom of religion sculpture by Marlene Hilton Moore at the McMurtry Gardens of Justice in Toronto

Canada today has no state religion, and the Government of Canada is officially committed to religious pluralism. While the Canadian government's official ties to religion, specifically Christianity are few, the Preamble to the Canadian Charter of Rights and Freedoms makes reference to "the supremacy of God." The national anthem in both official languages also refers to God. Nevertheless, the rise of irreligion within the country and influx of non-Christian peoples has led to a greater separation of government and religion, demonstrated in forms like "Christmas holidays" being called "winter festivals" in public schools. Some religious schools are government-funded as per Section Twenty-nine of the Canadian Charter of Rights and Freedoms.

Canada is a Commonwealth realm in which the head of state is shared with 14 other countries. As such, Canada follows the United Kingdom's succession laws for its monarch, which bar Catholics from inheriting the throne. Within Canada, the monarch's title includes the phrases "By the Grace of God".

Christmas and Easter are nationwide holidays, and while Jews, Muslims, Hindus, Buddhists and other religious groups are allowed to take their holy days off work, they do not share the same official recognition. In 1957, the Parliament declared Thanksgiving "a day of general thanksgiving to almighty God for the bountiful harvest with which Canada has been blessed."

There was an ongoing battle in the late 20th century to have religious garb accepted throughout Canadian society, mostly focused on Sikh turbans. The Canadian Armed Forces authorized the wearing of turbans in 1986, eventually the Royal Canadian Mounted Police followed in 1988 and eventually other federal government agencies accepted members wearing turbans.

In 2023, the country was scored 3 out of 4 for religious freedom by Freedom House; noting concern with the freedom of religion expression in Quebec society.

== History ==
=== Before 1800s ===
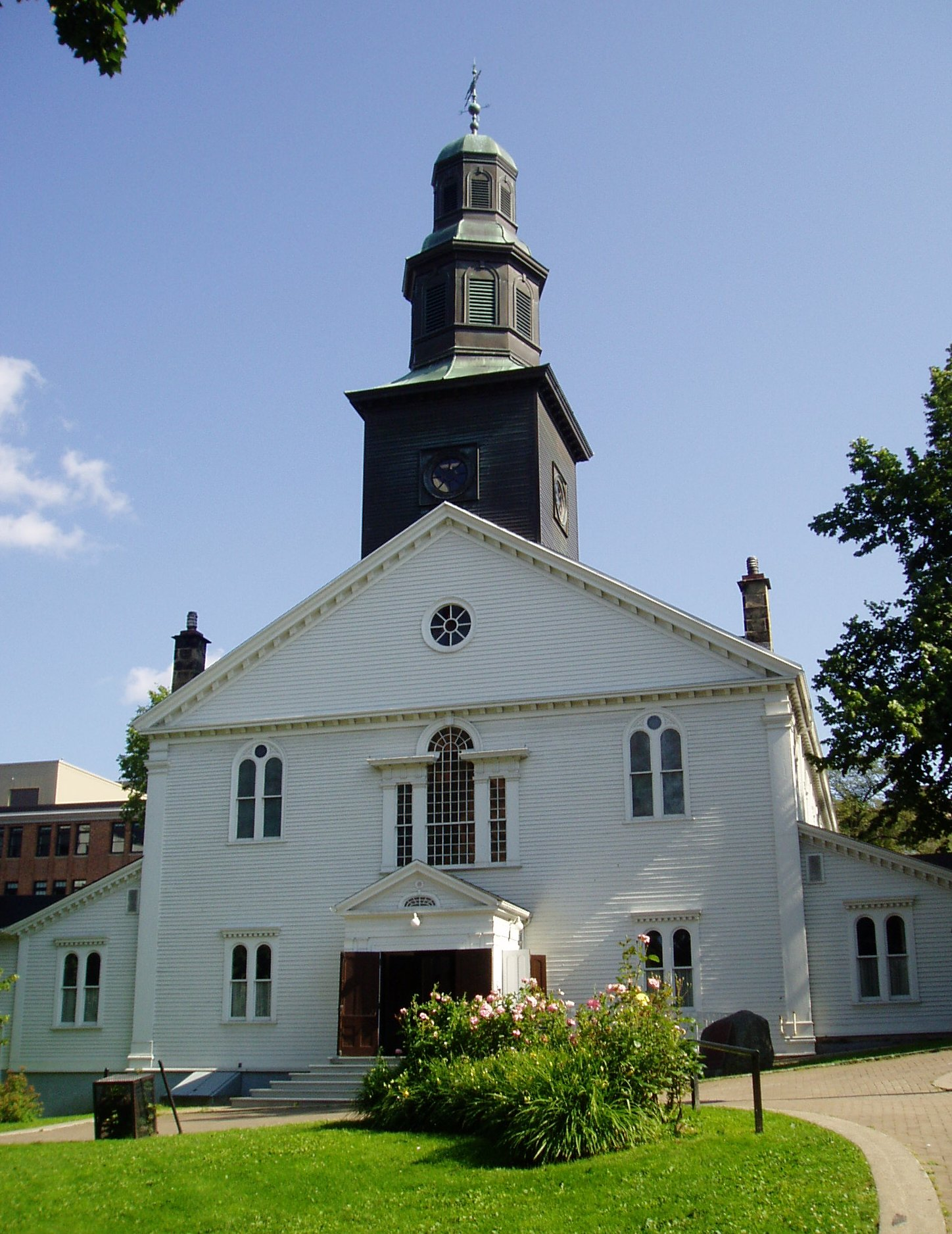
St. Paul's Church, Halifax, Nova Scotia, the oldest Anglican church in Canada still standing, built in 1750

Before the arrival of Europeans, the Indigenous peoples followed a wide array of mostly animistic religions and spirituality; "including the presence of creation stories, the role of tricksters or of supernatural beings in folklore and the importance of sacred organizations". Common concept is the supernatural world of deities, spirits and wonders, such as the Algonquian manitou.

The first Europeans to settle in great numbers in Canada were French Catholics, including a large number of Jesuits who established several missions in North America. They were dedicated to converting the Indigenous peoples; an effort that eventually proved successful.

The first large Protestant communities were formed in the Maritimes after they were conquered by the British. Unable to convince enough British immigrants to go to the region, the government decided to import continental Protestants from Germany and Switzerland to populate the region and counterbalance the Catholic Acadians. This group was known as the Foreign Protestants. This effort proved successful and today the South Shore region of Nova Scotia is still largely Lutheran. After the Expulsion of the Acadians beginning in 1755 a large number of New England Planters settled on the vacated lands bringing with them their Congregationalist belief. During the 1770s, guided by Henry Alline, the New Light movement of the Great Awakening swept through the Atlantic region converting many of the Congregationalists to the new theology. After Alline's death many of these Newlights eventually became Baptists, thus making Maritime Canada the heartland of the Baptist movement in Canada.

The Quebec Act of 1774 acknowledged the rights of the Catholic Church throughout Lower Canada in order to keep the French Canadians loyal to Britannic Crown. Catholicism is still the main religion of French Canadians today.

The American Revolution beginning in 1765 brought a large influx of Protestants to Canada when United Empire Loyalists, fleeing the rebellious United States, moved in large numbers to Upper Canada and the Maritimes.

=== 1800s to 1900s ===
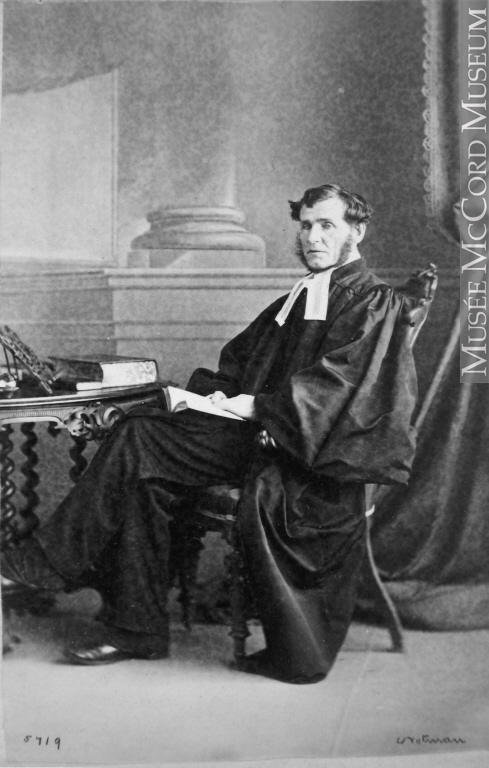
James Caughey (9 April 1810 – 30 January 1891) was a Methodist minister and evangelist who was active in Canada.

While Anglicans consolidated their hold on the upper classes, workingmen and farmers responded to the Methodist revivals, often sponsored by visiting preachers from the United States. Typical was Rev. James Caughey, an American sent by the Wesleyan Methodist Church from the 1840s through 1864. He brought in the converts by the score, most notably in the revivals in Western Canada from 1851 to 1853. His technique combined restrained emotionalism with a clear call for personal commitment, coupled with follow-up action to organize support from converts. It was a time when the holiness movement caught fire, with the revitalized interest of men and women in Christian perfection. Caughey successfully bridged the gap between the style of earlier camp meetings and the needs of more sophisticated Methodist congregations in the emerging cities.

In the early nineteenth century in the Maritimes and Upper Canada, the Anglican Church held the same official position it did in England. This caused tension within English Canada, as much of the populace was not Anglican. Increasing immigration from Scotland created a very large Presbyterian community and they and other groups demanded equal rights. This was an important cause of the 1837 Rebellion in Upper Canada. With the arrival of responsible governments, the Anglican monopoly was ended.

In Lower Canada, the Catholic Church was officially pre-eminent and had a central role in the colony's culture and politics. Unlike English Canada, French Canadian nationalism became very closely associated with Catholicism. During this period, the Catholic Church in the region became one of the most reactionary in the world. Known as Ultramontane Catholicism, the church adopted positions condemning all manifestations of liberalism.

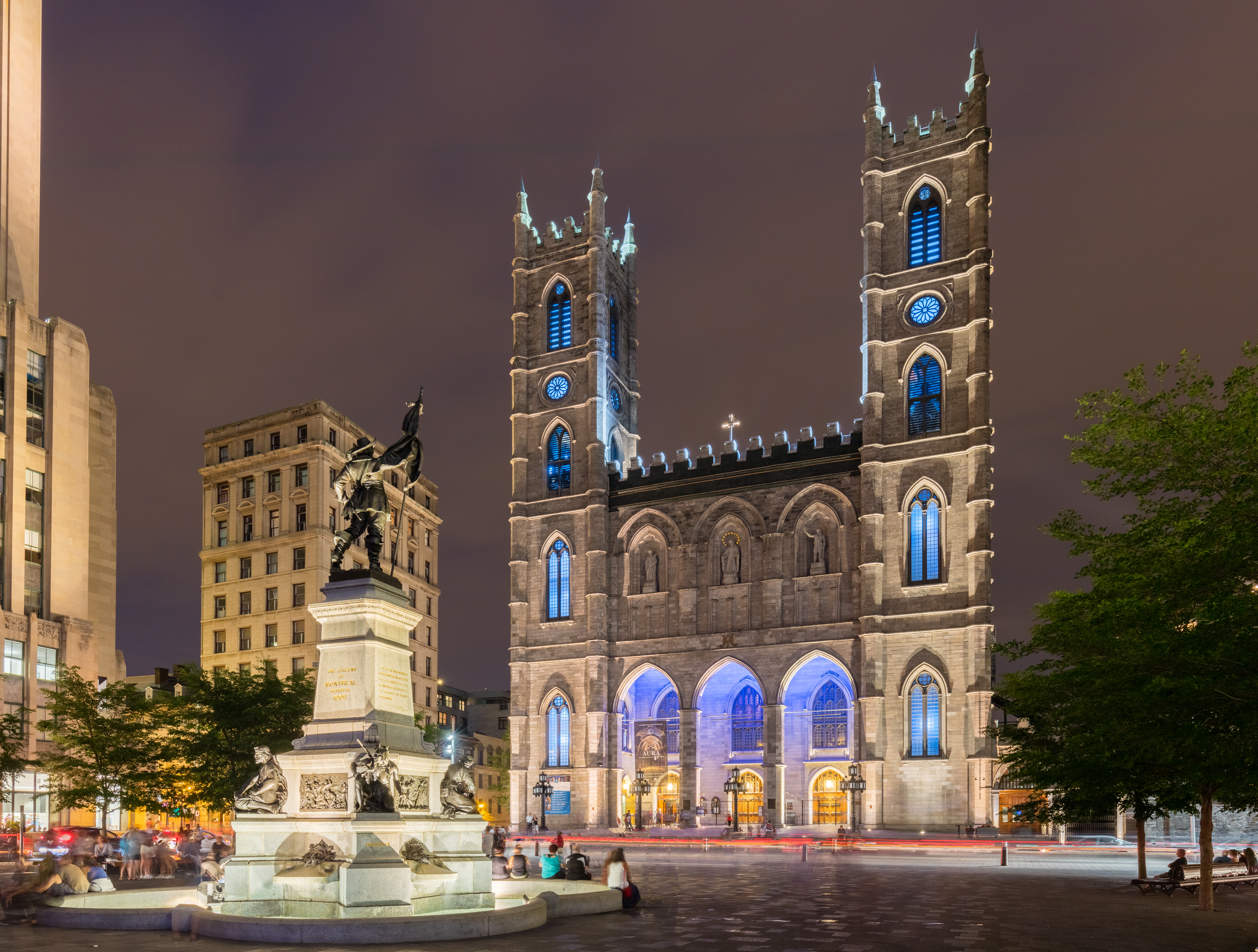
Notre-Dame Basilica (Catholic) in Montreal, Quebec

In politics, those aligned with the Catholic clergy in Quebec were known as les bleus (the blues). They formed a curious alliance with the staunchly monarchist and pro-British Anglicans of English Canada (often members of the Orange Order) to form the basis of the Canadian Conservative Party. The Reform Party, which later became the Liberal Party, was largely composed of the anti-clerical French Canadians, known as les rouges (the reds) and the non-Anglican Protestant groups. In those times, right before elections, parish priests would give sermons to their flock where they said things like Le ciel est bleu et l'enfer est rouge ("the sky (heaven) is blue and hell is red").

In 1871, national census revealed 56.45% as Protestants, 42.80% as Catholic, 0.05% as Pagans, 0.03% as Jewish, 0.02% as Mormons, 0.15% as irreligious and 0.49% as unspecified.

By the late nineteenth century, Protestant pluralism had taken hold in English Canada. While much of the elite were still Anglican, other groups, including the Methodists, had become very prominent as well. The schools and universities created at this time reflected this pluralism with major centres of learning being established for each faith. One, King's College, later the University of Toronto, was set up as a non-denominational school. The influence of the Orange Order was strong, especially among Irish Protestant immigrants, and comprised a powerful anti-Catholic force in Ontario politics; its influence faded away after 1920.

The late nineteenth century also saw the beginning of a large shift in Canadian immigration patterns. Large numbers of Irish and Southern European immigrants were creating new Catholic communities in English Canada. Western Canada saw the arrival of significant Eastern Orthodox immigrants from Eastern Europe as well as Mormon and Pentecostal immigrants from the United States and Ireland.

=== 1900s to 1960s ===
Denomination	Pop, 1951	% of total
Catholic	6,069,496	43.3%
United Church	2,867,271	20.5%
Anglican	2,060,720	14.7%
Presbyterian	781,747	5.6%
Baptist	519,585	3.7%
Lutheran	444,923	3.2%
Jewish	204,836	1.5%
Ukrainian (Greek) Catholic	190,831	1.4%
Greek Orthodox	172,271	1.2%
Mennonite	125,938	0.9%
Pentecostal	95,131	0.7%
Salvation Army	70,275	0.5%
Evangelical	50,900	0.4%
Jehovah's Witnesses	34,596	0.2%
Mormon	32,888	0.2%
No religion	59,679	0.4%
Other/not recorded	260,625	1.9%

In 1919–20 Canada's five major Protestant denominations (Anglican, Baptist, Congregational, Methodist, and Presbyterian) cooperatively undertook the "Forward Movement." The goal was to raise funds and to strengthen Christian spirituality in Canada. The movement invoked Anglophone nationalism by linking donations with the Victory Loan campaigns of the First World War, and stressed the need for funds to Canadianize immigrants. Centred in Ontario, the campaign was a clear financial success, raising over $11 million. However the campaign exposed deep divisions among Protestants, with the traditional Evangelists speaking of a personal relationship with God and the more liberal denominations emphasizing the Social Gospel and good works. Both factions (apart from the Anglicans) agreed on prohibition, which was demanded by the WCTU.

As of 1931, Catholics were the largest religious body in Canada, with 4 million people. Following it were the United Church of Canada (including Methodists, Congregationalists and Presbyterians), with 2 million; the Anglican Church, with nearly 2 million; and the Presbyterian Church, with approximately 870,000. The Canada Year Book 1936 reported that "of the non-Christian sects, 155,614 or 1.50% were Jews, 24,087 or 0.23% were Confucians, 15,784 or 0.15% were Buddhists and 5,008 or 0.05% were pagans.

Domination of Canadian society by Protestant and Catholic elements continued until well into the 20th century. Until the 1960s, most parts of Canada still had extensive Lord's Day laws that limited what one could do on a Sunday. The English Canadian elite were still dominated by Protestants, and Jews and Catholics were often excluded. A slow process of liberalization began after the Second World War in English Canada. Overtly Christian laws were expunged, including those against homosexuality. Policies favouring Christian immigration were also abolished.

In 1951, a nationwide census was taken after incorporation of predominantly Protestant province of Newfoundland and Labrador.

According to statistics provided by Statistics Canada, Protestants held a slight majority in the country between 1871 and 1961. Despite Canada's large Catholic population, this fact is confirmed by nine consecutive national censuses. By 1961, Catholics overtook Protestants as the most numerous religious group, although—unlike Protestants—they never reached the absolute majority status (>50%).

=== 1960s and after ===
The most overwhelming change was the Quiet Revolution in Quebec in the 1960s. Up through the 1950s, the province was one of the most traditional Catholic areas in the world. Church attendance rates were high, and the schools were largely controlled by the Church. In the 1960s, the Catholic Church lost most of its influence in Quebec, and religiosity declined sharply. While the majority of Québécois are still professed Latin Church Catholics, rates of church attendance have decreased dramatically. Since then, common-law relationships, abortion, and support for same-sex marriage are much more common in Quebec than previously, exceeding levels in some other areas of Canada.

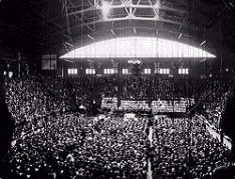
Inauguration of United Church at Mutual Street Arena, Toronto, on June 10, 1925

English Canada also underwent secularization. The United Church of Canada, the country's largest Protestant denomination, became one of the most liberal major Protestant churches in the world. Flatt argues that in the 1960s Canada's rapid cultural changes led the United Church to end its evangelical programs and change its identity. It made revolutionary changes in its evangelistic campaigns, educational programs, moral stances, and theological image. However, membership declined sharply as the United Church affirmed a commitment to gay rights including marriage and ordination, and to the ordination of women.

In 1971, Canada was 47% Catholic, 41% Protestant, 4% other religion and 4% unaffiliated.

Meanwhile, a strong current of evangelical Protestantism emerged. The largest groups are found in the Atlantic provinces and Western Canada, particularly in Alberta, Southern Manitoba and the Southern interior and Fraser Valley region of British Columbia, also known as the "Canadian Bible Belt", as well as parts of Ontario outside the Greater Toronto Area. The social environment is more conservative, somewhat more in line with that of the Midwestern and Southern United States, and same-sex marriage, abortion, and common-law relationships are less widely accepted. The evangelical movement has grown sharply after 1960, and increasingly influences public policy. Nevertheless, the overall proportion of evangelicals in Canada remains considerably lower than in the United States, and the polarization much less intense. There are very few evangelicals in Quebec and in the largest urban areas, which are generally secular, although there are several congregations above 1000 members in most large cities.

=== Indigenous residential school system ===
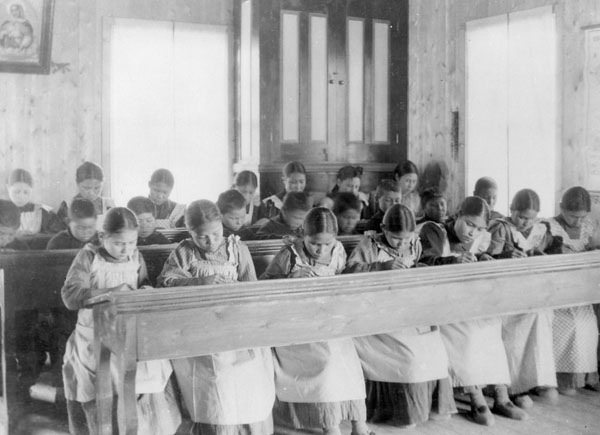
Study period at a Catholic Indian Residential School in Fort Resolution, NWT

Administered by various Christian churches and funded by the Canadian government from 1828 to 1997 Canadian Indian residential school system attempted to assimilate Indigenous children into Euro-Canadian culture. The residential school system was established by Christian missionaries with the express purpose of converting Indigenous children to Christianity, schools often had nearby mission where possible graves of hundreds of Indigenous people were discovered. A period of redress began with the formation of the Truth and Reconciliation Commission of Canada by the Government of Canada in 2008. This included recognition of past colonial genocide and settlement agreements. In October 2022, the Canadian House of Commons unanimously passed a motion calling on the federal Canadian government to recognize the residential school system as genocide. This acknowledgment was followed by a visit by Pope Francis who apologized for Church members' role in what he labelled the "oppression, mistreatment and cultural genocide of indigenous people".

== Christianity ==
Province/Territory	Christians
Newfoundland and Labrador	82.44%
Nunavut	73.53%
Prince Edward Island	67.62%
New Brunswick	67.52%
Quebec	64.82%
Nova Scotia	58.18%
Saskatchewan	56.31%
Manitoba	54.23%
Northwest Territories	55.16%
Canada	53.33%
Ontario	52.14%
Alberta	48.11%
Yukon	35.01%
British Columbia	34.27%

The majority of Canadian Christians attend church services infrequently. Cross-national surveys of religiosity rates such as the Pew Global Attitudes Project indicate that, on average, Canadian Christians are less observant than those of the United States but are still more overtly religious than their counterparts in Western Europe. In 2002, 30% of Canadians reported to Pew researchers that religion was "very important" to them. A 2005 Gallup poll showed that 28% of Canadians consider religion to be "very important" (55% of Americans and 19% of Britons say the same). Regional differences within Canada exist, however, with British Columbia and Quebec reporting especially low metrics of traditional religious observance, as well as a significant urban-rural divide, while Saskatchewan and rural Alberta saw high rates of religious attendance. The rates for weekly church attendance are contested, with estimates running as low as 11% as per the latest Ipsos-Reid poll and as high as 25% as per Christianity Today magazine. This American magazine reported that three polls conducted by Focus on the Family, Time Canada and the Vanier Institute of the Family showed church attendance increasing for the first time in a generation, with weekly attendance at 25 per cent. This number is similar to the statistics reported by premier Canadian sociologist of religion, Prof. Reginald Bibby of the University of Lethbridge, who has been studying Canadian religious patterns since 1975. Although lower than in the US, which has reported weekly church attendance at about 40% since the Second World War, weekly church attendance rates are higher than those in Northern Europe.

Christianity in Canada (2021 census)
1. Catholicism (29.9%)
2. Protestantism (14.1%)
3. Orthodoxy (1.70%)
4. Other Christians (7.60%)
5. Non-Christians (46.7%)

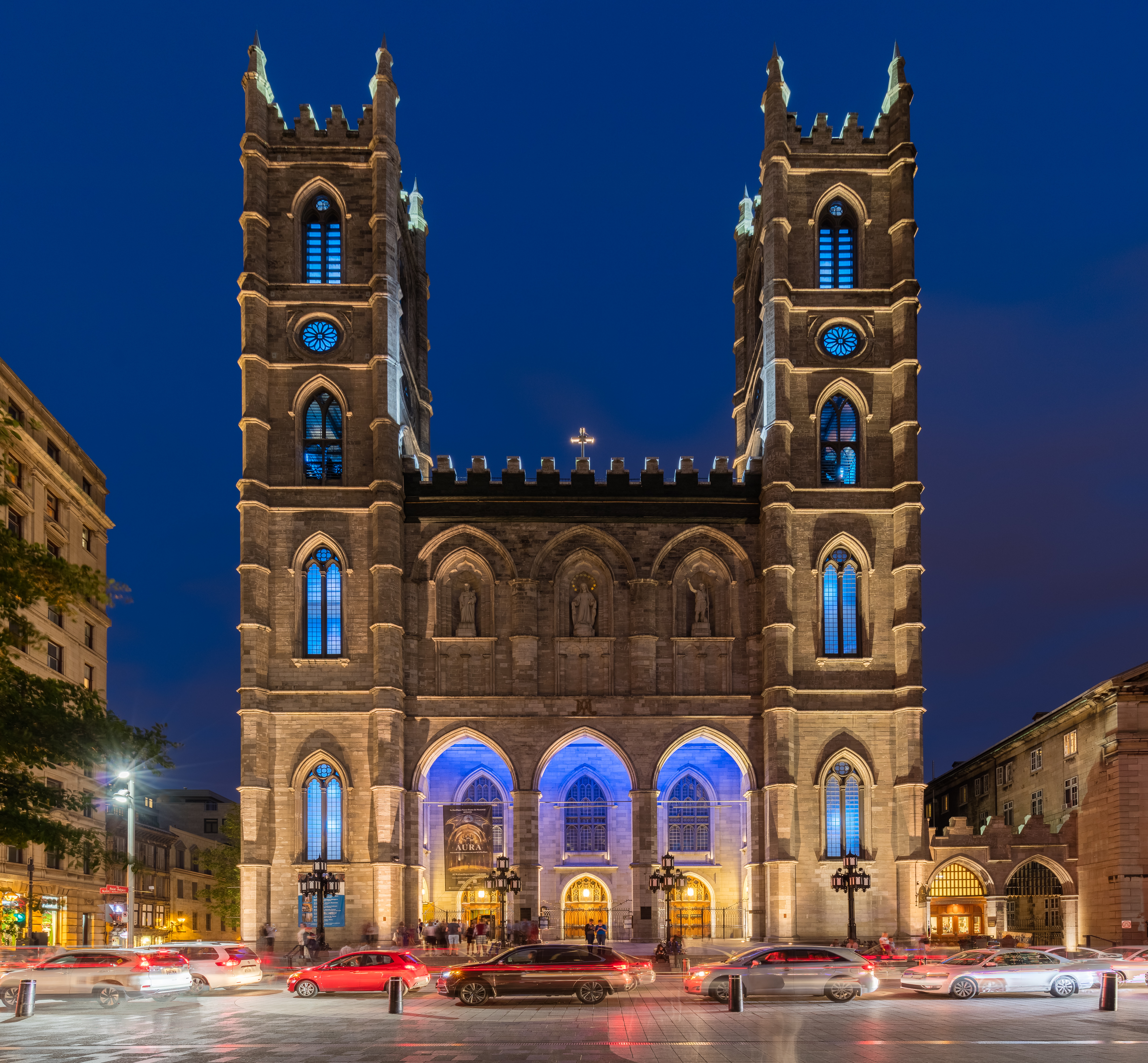
Notre-Dame Basilica of Montreal in Quebec is a Catholic Christian church.

As well as the large churches—Catholic, United, and Anglican, which together count more than half of the Canadian population as nominal adherents—Canada also has many smaller Christian groups, including Eastern Orthodoxy. The Egyptian population in Ontario and Quebec (Greater Toronto in particular) has seen a large influx of the Coptic Orthodox population in just a few decades. The relatively large Ukrainian population of Manitoba and Saskatchewan has produced many followers of the Ukrainian Catholic and Ukrainian Orthodox Churches, while southern Manitoba has been settled largely by Mennonites. The concentration of these smaller groups often varies greatly across the country. Baptists are especially numerous in the Maritimes. The Maritimes, prairie provinces, and southwestern Ontario have significant numbers of Lutherans. Southwest Ontario has seen large numbers of German and Russian immigrants, including many Mennonites and Hutterites, as well as a significant contingent of Dutch Reformed. Alberta has seen considerable immigration from the American plains, creating a significant Mormon minority in that province. The Church of Jesus Christ of Latter-day Saints claimed to have 178,102 members (74,377 of whom in Alberta) at the end of 2007. And according to the Jehovah's Witnesses year report there are 111,963 active members (members who actively preach) in Canada.

Canada as a nation is becoming increasingly religiously diverse, especially in large urban centres such as Toronto, Vancouver, and Montreal, where minority groups and new immigrants who make up the growth in most religious groups congregate. Two significant trends become clear when the current religious landscape is examined closely. One is the loss of ‘secularized' Canadians as active and regular participants in the churches and denominations they grew up in, which were overwhelmingly Christian, while these churches remain a part of Canadians' cultural identity. The other is the increasing presence of ethnically diverse immigration within the religious makeup of the country.

As Mainline Protestants and Catholics have experienced drastic losses over the past 30 years, others have been expanding rapidly: overall by 144% in ‘Eastern' religions during the 1981–1991 decade. Considering Canada's increasing reliance on immigration to bolster a low birth rate, the situation is only likely to continue to diversify. This increased influx of ethnic immigrants not only affects the types of religions represented in the Canadian context but also the increasingly multicultural and multilingual makeup of individual Christian denominations. From Chinese Anglican or Korean United Church communities, to the Lutheran focus on providing much needed services to immigrants new to the Canadian context and English language, immigration is making changes. Much as many Catholics in Quebec ignore the Church's stance on birth control, abortion, or premarital sex, the churches do not dictate much of the daily lives of regular Canadians.

For some Protestant denominations, adapting to a new secular context has meant adjusting to their non-institutional roles in society by increasingly focusing on social justice. However the pull between conservative religious members and the more radical among the church members is complicated by the numbers of immigrant communities who may desire a church that fulfils a more ‘institutionally complete' role as a buffer in this new country over the current tension filled debates over same-sex marriage, ordination of women and homosexuals, or the role of women in the church. This of course will depend on the background of the immigrant population, as in the Hong Kong context where ordination of Florence Li Tim Oi happened long before women's ordination was ever raised on the Canadian Anglican church level.

As well a multicultural focus on the churches part may include non-Christian elements (such as the inclusion of a Buddhist priest in one incident) which are unwelcome to the transplanted religious community. Serving the needs and desires of different aspects of the Canadian and newly Canadian populations makes a difficult balancing act for the various mainline churches which are starved for money and active parishioners in a time when 16% of Canadians identify as non-religious and up to two-thirds of those who do identify with a denomination use the church only for its life-cycle rituals governing birth, marriage, and death. The church retains that hold in their parishioners' lives but not the commitment of time and energy necessary to support an aging institution.

Evangelical portions of the Protestant groups proclaim their growth as well but as Roger O'Tool notes they make up 7% of the Canadian population and seem to gain most of their growth from a higher birthrate. What is significant is the higher participation of their members in contrast to Mainline Protestants and Catholics. This high commitment would seem to translate into the kind of political power evangelicals in the United States enjoy but despite Canada's historically Christian background as Beaman notes neatly "...[forming] the backdrop for social process" explicit religiosity appears to have not effectively moved the government towards legal discrimination against gay marriage.

There was a major religious revival in Toronto in the 1990s known as the Toronto Blessing at a small Vineyard Church near the Toronto Pearson International Airport. This religious event was the largest tourist attraction to Toronto in 1994. This event was characterized by unusual religious ecstasy such as being slain in the Spirit, laughing uncontrollably, and other odd behaviour.

A 2015 study estimates some 43,000 believers in Christ from a Muslim background in Canada, most of whom belong to the evangelical tradition.

=== Protestantism ===
==== Anglican Church of Canada ====
Anglican Church of Canada is the only official church of the Anglican Communion in Canada. Across Canada there are approximately 1,700 individual churches or parishes, which are organized into 30 different dioceses, each led by a bishop. The national church office is known as the General Synod. The Primate is the Archbishop Linda Nicholls, national pastoral leader.

==== Evangelicalism ====
The Evangelical Fellowship of Canada, a national evangelical alliance, member of the World Evangelical Alliance was founded in 1964 in Toronto. It brings together 43 Evangelical Christian denominations.

The Pentecostal Assemblies of Canada were founded in 1914.

The Canadian Baptist Ministries were founded in 1944. As of May 2026, Canadian Baptist Ministries reported having 70,616 members across 912 churches.

==== The Church of Jesus Christ of Latter-day Saints ====
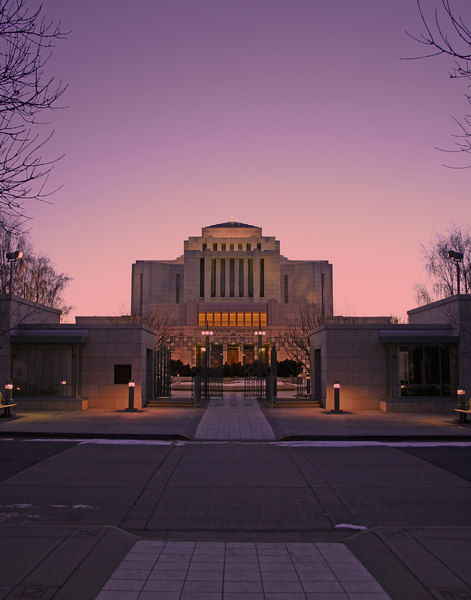
The Cardston Alberta Temple, the oldest LDS temple outside the United States

The Church of Jesus Christ of Latter-day Saints (LDS Church) has had a presence in Canada since its organization in New York State in 1830. Canada has been used as a refuge territory by members of the LDS Church to avoid enforcement of anti-polygamy laws by the United States government. The first LDS Church in Canada was established in 1895 in what would become Alberta; it was the first stake of the Church to be established outside the United States. The LDS Church has founded several communities in Alberta.

In the 2021 census sampling, about 0.2% of the population (equal to about 87,725 people) claimed to be members of the LDS Church. In 2021, the LDS Church claimed around 200,000 members in Canada; It has congregations in all Canadian provinces and territories and possesses at least one temple in six of the ten provinces, including the oldest LDS temple outside the United States. Alberta is the province with the most members of the LDS Church in Canada, having approximately 40% of the total of Canadian LDS Church members and representing 2% of the total population of the province (the National Household survey of 2011 has Alberta with over 50% of the Canadian Mormons and 1.6% of the province's population), followed by Ontario and British Columbia.

==== Anabaptism ====
===== Hutterian Brethren =====
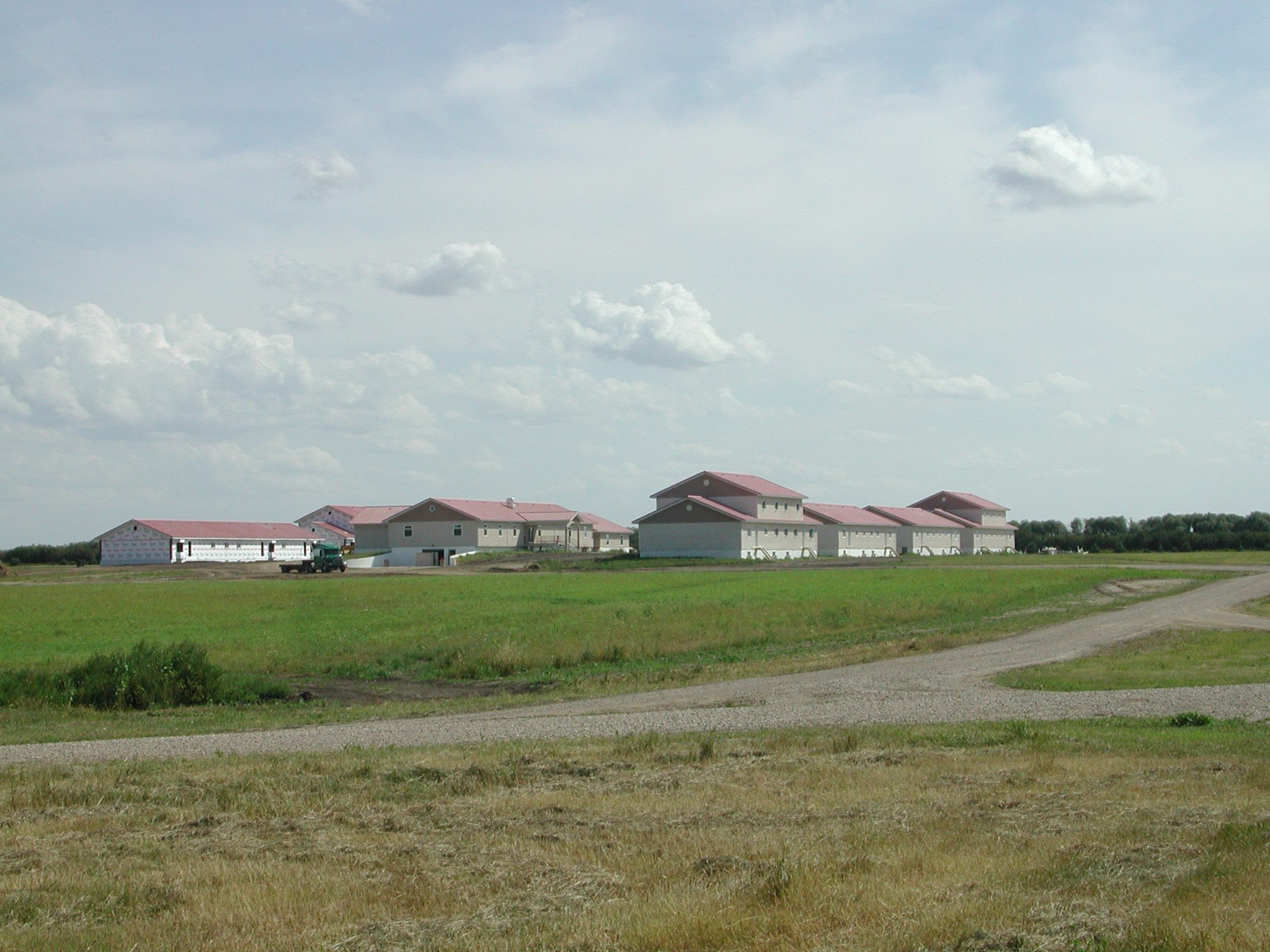
A Hutterite colony in Manitoba

In the mid-1870s Hutterites moved from Europe to the Dakota Territory in the United States to avoid military service and other persecutions. During World War I Hutterites suffered from persecutions in the United States because they are pacifist and refused military service. They then moved almost all of their communities to Canada in the Western provinces of Alberta and Manitoba in 1918. In the 1940s, there were 52 Hutterite colonies in Canada.

Today, more than 75% of the world's Hutterite colonies are located in Canada, mainly in Alberta, Manitoba and Saskatchewan, the rest being almost exclusively in the United States. The Hutterite population in North America is about 45,000 people.

===== Mennonites =====
First Mennonites arrived in Canada in 1786 from Pennsylvania, but following Mennonites arrived directly from Europe. The Mennonite Church Canada had about 35,000 members in 1998.

=== Catholicism ===
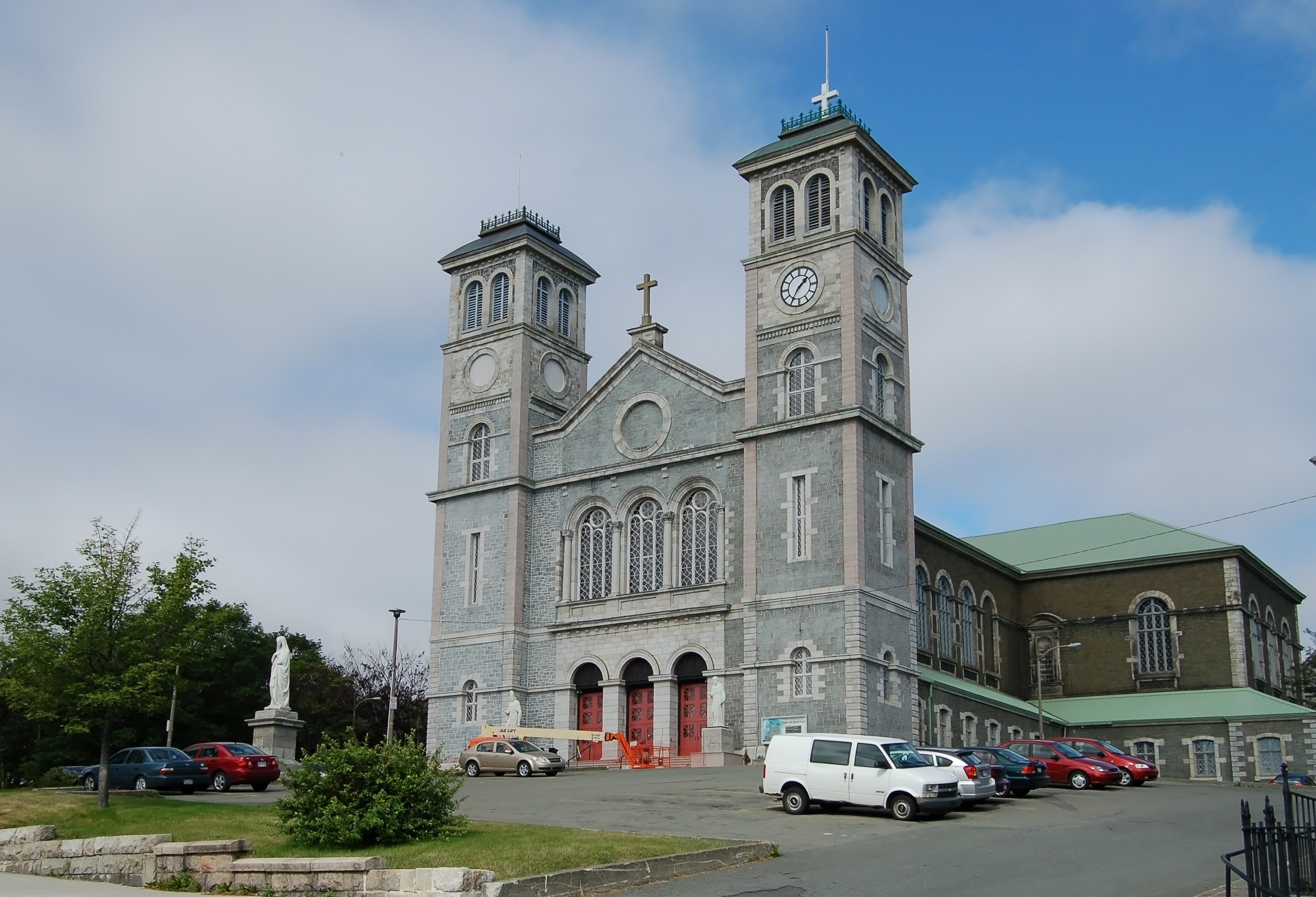
Front of the Basilica of St. John the Baptist in St. John's, Newfoundland

The Catholic Church in Canada, under the spiritual leadership of the Pope and the Canadian Conference of Catholic Bishops, has the largest number of adherents to a religion in Canada, with 38.7% of Canadians (13.07 million) reported as Catholics in the 2011 National Household Survey, in 72 dioceses across the provinces and territories, served by about 8,000 priests. Quebec is the only Canadian province where the majority of its population adhere to Catholicism. However, even in Quebec, the percentage of Catholics has significantly decreased over time. It was the first European faith in what is now Canada, arriving in 1497 when John Cabot landed on Newfoundland and raised the Venetian and Papal banners, claiming the land for his sponsor King Henry VII of England, while recognizing the religious authority of the Catholic Church.

The entire Catholic Church in Canada is placed under the Primate of Canada which corresponds to the Archdiocese of Quebec and its bishop, the Primate of Canada. Currently, Gérald Cyprien Lacroix is the Primate of Canada. The Pope is represented in Canada by the Apostolic Nunciature in Canada (Ottawa).

=== Orthodoxy ===
==== Eastern Orthodoxy ====
Adherents of Eastern Orthodox Christianity in Canada belong to several ecclesiastical jurisdictions. Historically, Eastern Orthodoxy was introduced to Canada during the course of 19th century, mainly through emigration of Christians from Eastern Europe and the Middle East. Honouring such diverse heritage, Eastern Orthodoxy in Canada is traditionally organized in accordance with patrimonial jurisdictions of autocephalous Eastern Orthodox Churches, each of them having its own hierarchy with dioceses and parishes.

According to 2011 census data, there were 550,690 Orthodox Christians. The Greek Orthodox community constitutes the largest Eastern Orthodox community in Canada, with 220,255 adherents, followed by other communities: Russian Orthodox (25,245), Ukrainian Orthodox (23,845), Serbian Orthodox (22,780), Romanian Orthodox (7,090), Macedonian Orthodox (4,945), Bulgarian Orthodox (1,765), Antiochian Orthodox (1,220) and several other minor communities within Eastern Orthodoxy. A number of 207,480 adherents reported only as Christian Orthodox.

According to data from the 2021 Canadian census, the Orthodox Christian population of Canada rose to 623,005.

==== Oriental Orthodoxy ====
Adherents of Oriental Orthodox Christianity in Canada also belong to several ethnic communities and ecclesiastical jurisdictions. According to 2011 census data, Coptic Orthodox community constitutes the largest Oriental Orthodox community in Canada, with 16,255 adherents. It is followed by other communities: Armenian Orthodox (13,730), Ethiopian Orthodox (3,025), Syriac Orthodox (3,060) and several other minor communities within Oriental Orthodoxy.

== Other Abrahamic religions ==
=== Islam ===
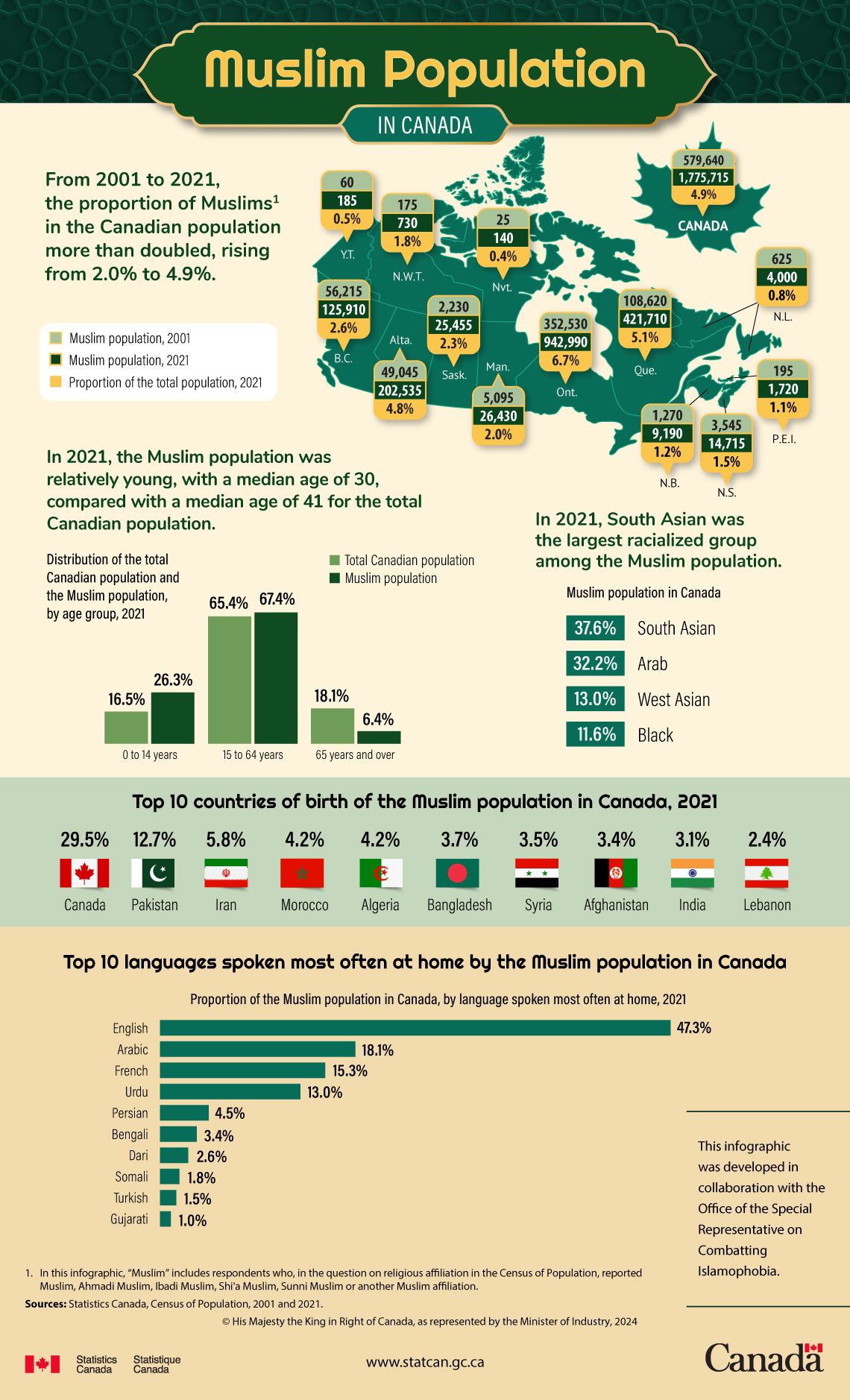
Muslim population of Canada

Four years after Canada's founding in 1867, the 1871 Canadian Census found 13 Muslims among the population. The first Canadian mosque was constructed in Edmonton in 1938, when there were approximately 700 Muslims in the country. This building is now part of the museum at Fort Edmonton Park. The years after World War II saw a small increase in the Muslim population. However, Muslims were still a distinct minority. It was only with the removal of European immigration preferences in the late 1960s that Muslims began to arrive in significant numbers.

According to Canada's 2001 census, there were 579,740 Muslims in Canada, just under 2% of the population. In 2006, the Muslim population was estimated to be 0.8 million or about 2.6%. In 2010, the Pew Research Centre estimated there were about 0.9 million Muslims in Canada. In the 2011 National Housing Survey, Muslims constituted 3.2% of the population making them largest religious adherents after Christianity. Sunni Islam is followed by the majority while there are significant numbers of Shia Muslims. Ahmadiyya also has a significant proportion with more than 25,000 Ahmadis living in Canada. There are also non-denominational Muslims. As of the 2021 census, the percentage of Muslims in Canada is 4.9%.

In 2007, the CBC introduced a popular television sitcom called Little Mosque on the Prairie, a contemporary reflection and critical commentary on attitudes towards Islam in Canada. In 2008, the Prime Minister of Canada, Stephen Harper, visited the Baitun Nur Mosque, the largest mosque in Canada for its inaugural session with the Head of the Ahmadiyya Muslim Community.

=== Judaism ===
Province or territory	Jews	Percentage
Canada	391,665	1.2%
Ontario	226,610	1.8%
Quebec	93,625	1.2%
British Columbia	35,005	0.8%
Alberta	15,795	0.4%
Manitoba	14,345	1.2%
Nova Scotia	2,910	0.3%
Saskatchewan	1,905	0.2%
New Brunswick	860	0.1%
Newfoundland and Labrador	220	0.0%
Prince Edward Island	185	0.1%
Yukon	145	0.4%
Northwest Territories	40	0.1%
Nunavut	15	0.1%

The Jewish community in Canada is almost as old as the nation itself. The earliest documentation of Jews in Canada is British Army records from the Seven Years' War from 1754. In 1807, Ezekiel Hart was elected to the legislature of Lower Canada, becoming the first Jew in the British Empire to hold an official position. Hart was sworn in on a Hebrew Bible as opposed to a Christian Bible. The next day an objection was raised that Hart had not taken the oath in the manner required for sitting in the assembly – an oath of abjuration, which would have required Hart to swear "on the true faith of a Christian". Hart was expelled from the assembly, only to be re-elected two more times. In 1768, the first synagogue in Canada was built in Montreal, the Spanish and Portuguese Synagogue of Montreal. In 1832, a law was passed in Lower Canada that guaranteed Jews the same political rights and freedoms as Christians.

The Jewish population saw a growth during the 1880s due to the pogroms of Russia and growing anti-Semitism. Between the years of 1880 and 1930 the Jewish population grew to 155,000. In 1872, Henry Nathan, Jr. became the first Jewish Member of Parliament, representing the Victoria, BC area in the newly created House of Commons. The First World War halted the flow of immigrants into Canada, and after the War there was a change in Canada's immigration policy to limit the immigration of people from "non-preferred nations", i.e., those not from the United Kingdom or otherwise White Anglo-Saxon Protestant nations. In June 1939 Canada and the United States were the last hope for 907 Jewish refugees aboard the steamship SS St. Louis which had been denied landing in Havana although the passengers had entry visas. The Canadian government ignored the protests of Canadian Jewish organizations. King said the crisis was not a "Canadian problem" and Blair added in a letter to O.D. Skelton, Undersecretary of State for External Affairs, dated June 16, 1939, "No country could open its doors wide enough to take in the hundreds of thousands of Jewish people who want to leave Europe: the line must be drawn somewhere." The ship finally had to return to Germany. During the Second World War almost twenty thousand Canadian Jews volunteered to fight overseas. Nearly 40,000 Holocaust survivors moved to Canada in the late 1940s to rebuild their lives.

In 2010, the Canadian Jewish community was the fourth largest in the world and practises in both of the official languages of Canada. There is an increase in the number of people that use Hebrew, other than for religious ceremonies, while there is a decline in the Yiddish language. Most of Canada's Jews live in Ontario and Quebec, with Toronto being the largest Jewish population centre. In 2009, anti-Semitic incidents jumped fivefold.

=== Baháʼí Faith ===
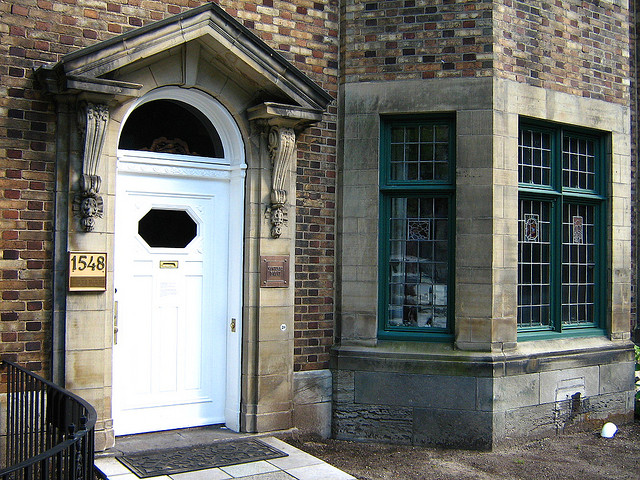
The Montréal Bahá'í Shrine

The Canadian community is one of the earliest western communities of the Baháʼí Faith, at one point sharing a joint National Spiritual Assembly with the United States, and is a co-recipient of `Abdu'l-Bahá's Tablets of the Divine Plan. The first North American woman to declare herself a Baháʼí was Kate C. Ives, of Canadian ancestry, though not living in Canada at the time. Moojan Momen, in reviewing "The Origins of the Baháʼí Community of Canada, 1898–1948" notes that "the Magee family... are credited with bringing the Baháʼí Faith to Canada. Edith Magee became a Baháʼí in 1898 in Chicago and returned to her home in London, Ontario, where four other female members of her family became Baháʼís. This predominance of women converts became a feature of the Canadian Baháʼí community..."

=== Druze Faith ===
In 2018, there were 25,000 Druze living in Canada, and fewer than 5,000 of them live in the Greater Toronto Area. They are mostly of Lebanese and Syrian descent. Druze practise Druzism, a monotheistic religion that encompasses aspects of Islam, Hinduism, Christianity, Judaism and Greek philosophy, among influences.

== Dharmic religions ==
=== Hinduism ===
Hindu population
Year	Pop.	±%
1961	460	—
1971	9,790	+2028.3%
1981	69,505	+610.0%
1991	157,015	+125.9%
2001	297,200	+89.3%
2011	497,200	+67.3%
2021	828,195	+66.6%
1961 and 1971 are partial and based on immigration data, real figures are substantially higher.

Hinduism is followed by 2.3% of the population of Canada. According to the 2021 census, there are 828,195 Hindus in Canada.

Hindus in Canada are generally Indian immigrants (mainly Punjabi, Gujarati, and Haryanvi) from India (and their descendants) who began arriving in British Columbia about 100 years ago and continue to immigrate today. There is a significant number of Sri Lankan Tamil Hindus in Canada who immigrated from Sri Lanka during the 1983 communal riots in Sri Lanka. Nepali Hindus, Caribbean Hindus from Trinidad and Tobago, Suriname and Guyana and Mauritian Hindus represent sizeable subgroups. There are also Canadian converts to the various sects of Hinduism through the efforts of the Hare Krishna movement, the Gurus during the last 50 years, and other organizations.

The vast majority of Hindus reside in Ontario (primarily in Toronto, Scarborough, Brampton, Hamilton, Windsor and Ottawa), Quebec (primarily around the Montreal area) and British Columbia, (primarily around the Vancouver area).

=== Buddhism ===
Buddhist population
Year	Pop.	±%
1901	10,407	—
1921	11,281	+8.4%
1941	15,635	+38.6%
1961	11,611	−25.7%
1981	51,955	+347.5%
2001	300,345	+478.1%
2021	356,975	+18.9%
Source: Beyer, 2021 Census

The 2021 census reported close to 360,000 Buddhists in Canada, representing 1% of its population, the same percentage reported in the 2001 census.

Buddhism has been practised in Canada for more than a century and in recent years has grown dramatically. Buddhism arrived in Canada with the arrival of Chinese labourers in the territories during the 19th century. Modern Buddhism in Canada traces to Japanese immigration during the late 19th century. The first Japanese Buddhist temple in Canada was built at the Ishikawa Hotel in Vancouver in 1905. In the 1971 Canadian census, nearly two-thirds of Buddhists in Canada were of Japanese ethnicity.

A substantial expansion of Buddhism in Canada began in the 1970s. Changes in Canadian immigration and refugee policies corresponded to increasing communities from South, Southeast, and East Asian nations with Buddhist traditions. The 2001 Canadian census reported that 54.5% of Buddhists in Canada were of Chinese origin, and 33.5% were of Southeast Asian origin, while the percentage of Japanese Buddhists had declined to 4.5% of the total. In the 2021 Canadian census, over 90% of Buddhists reported being part of a visible minority, with Chinese (37%), Vietnamese (26%), Cambodian (5.5%), and Sri Lankan/Sinhalese (5.3%) being the most common ethnic origins.

=== Sikhism ===
Sikh population (Note: 1901-1951 populations are 95% of the total South Asian Canadian population enumerated in each decadal census during the timeframe, based on the quote "From 1904 to the 1940s, 95% of all South Asian immigrants to Canada were Sikhs from the Punjab region of India.", taken from page 4 of the book "A Social History of South Asians in British Columbia". Figures for 1961 and 1971 use a falling decadal average of the Sikh proportion of the total South Asian Canadian between 95% in 1951, compared with 31.5% in 1981. This results in Sikhs forming 73.8% of the total South Asian Canadian population in 1961 and forming 52.6% of the total South Asian Canadian population in 1971. The total South Asian Canadian population in the 1961 census was 6,774 persons, and 67,925 persons in the 1971 census. Immigration data collected on the 2001 and 2011 census indicate there were 1,290 Sikh immigrants in Canada in 1961, and 9,655 Sikh immigrants in Canada in 1971, an undercount as this did not include the native-born population.)
Year	Pop.	±%
1901	95	—
1931	1,330	+1300.0%
1961	5,000	+275.9%
1981	67,715	+1254.3%
2011	454,965	+571.9%
2021	771,790	+69.6%
Source: Statistics Canada

Sikhism has nearly 800,000 adherents who account for 2.1% of Canada's population as of 2021, forming the country's fastest-growing and fourth-largest religious group. The largest Sikh populations in Canada are found in Ontario, followed by British Columbia and Alberta. As of the 2021 Census, more than half of Canada's Sikhs can be found in one of four cities: Brampton (163,260), Surrey (154,415), Calgary (49,465), and Edmonton (41,385).

Canada is home to the largest national Sikh proportion in the world (2.1%), and also has the second-largest Sikh population in the world, after India. British Columbia has the third-largest Sikh proportion (5.9%) amongst all global administrative divisions, behind only Punjab and Chandigarh in India. British Columbia, Manitoba, and Yukon hold the distinction of being three of the only four administrative divisions in the world with Sikhism as the second most followed religion among the population. (Note: Sikhism is the second-largest religion in British Columbia, Manitoba, and Yukon. Per the 2011 Indian census, Sikhism is the largest religion in Punjab and second in Chandigarh. These are the only two Indian states/UTs where Sikhism is one of the two most common religions.)

=== Jainism ===
The first official Jain temple was established in Toronto in 1988. This temple served both the Digambar and Śvetāmbara communities.

== Folk religions ==
=== Modern Paganism ===
Census data showed Modern Paganism grew by 281 per cent between 1991 and 2001, making it the fastest growing religion in Canada during that decade.

==== Druidry ====
Druidry in Canada encompasses a variety of groves and seed groups affiliated with major Druid organizations.

In Neo-Druid history a notable community was the Reformed Druids of North America, one of whose four founders was Canadian, which served both the US Druid community and the Canadian Druid community. Neo-Druidism largely spread in Canada through the Ancient Order of the Druids during the 19th century.

== Irreligion ==
Irreligious Canadians include atheists, agnostics, and humanists. The surveys may also include those who are spiritual, deists, and pantheists. According to Ontario Consultants on Religious Tolerance, among those estimated 4.9 million Canadians of no religion, an estimated 1.9 million would specify atheist, 1.8 million would specify agnostic, and 1.2 million humanist.

In 1991 the irreligious made up 12.3% of the Canadian population. The 2021 Canadian census reported that 34.6% of Canadians declare no religious affiliation, which is up from 23.9% in the 2011 Canadian census and 16.5% in the 2001 Canadian census.

Some non-religious Canadians have formed associations, such as the Humanist Association of Canada, Mouvement laïque québécois, Toronto Secular Alliance or the Centre for Inquiry Canada, as well as a number of University Campus Groups.

== Non-Christian religions ==
Canada's largest religion and majority religion has been Christianity since its foundation as a nation. Christians represent 53.3% of the population as of the 2021 census. However, there has been significant growth in minority religions particularly Islam, Hinduism, and Sikhism. Canadians following Indigenous Spirituality has also seen some growth in the last 30 years. Indigenous spirituality has grown from 29,820 in 2001 to 80,690 in 2021. The rise can be explained by the abolishment of residential schools (last one closing in 1996 in Saskatchewan) and the freedom for Indigenous peoples to follow their ancestral faiths. Indigenous people following Christianity fell from 62% to 47% between 2011 and 2021. Indigenous spirituality has at the same time increased by 25% during the same time period suggesting a transition in faith.

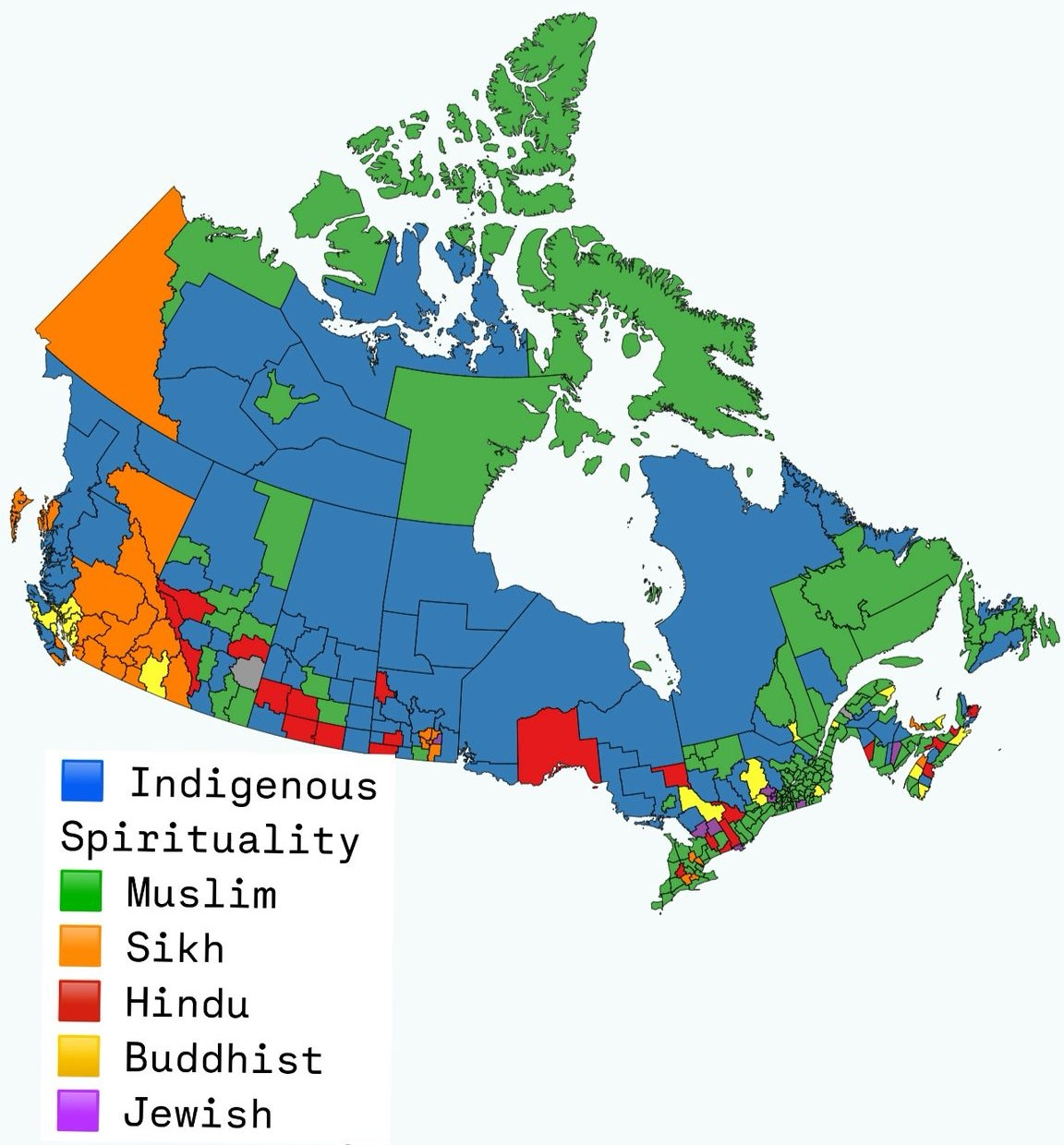
Largest non-Christian religion in Canada by census division, 2021 census

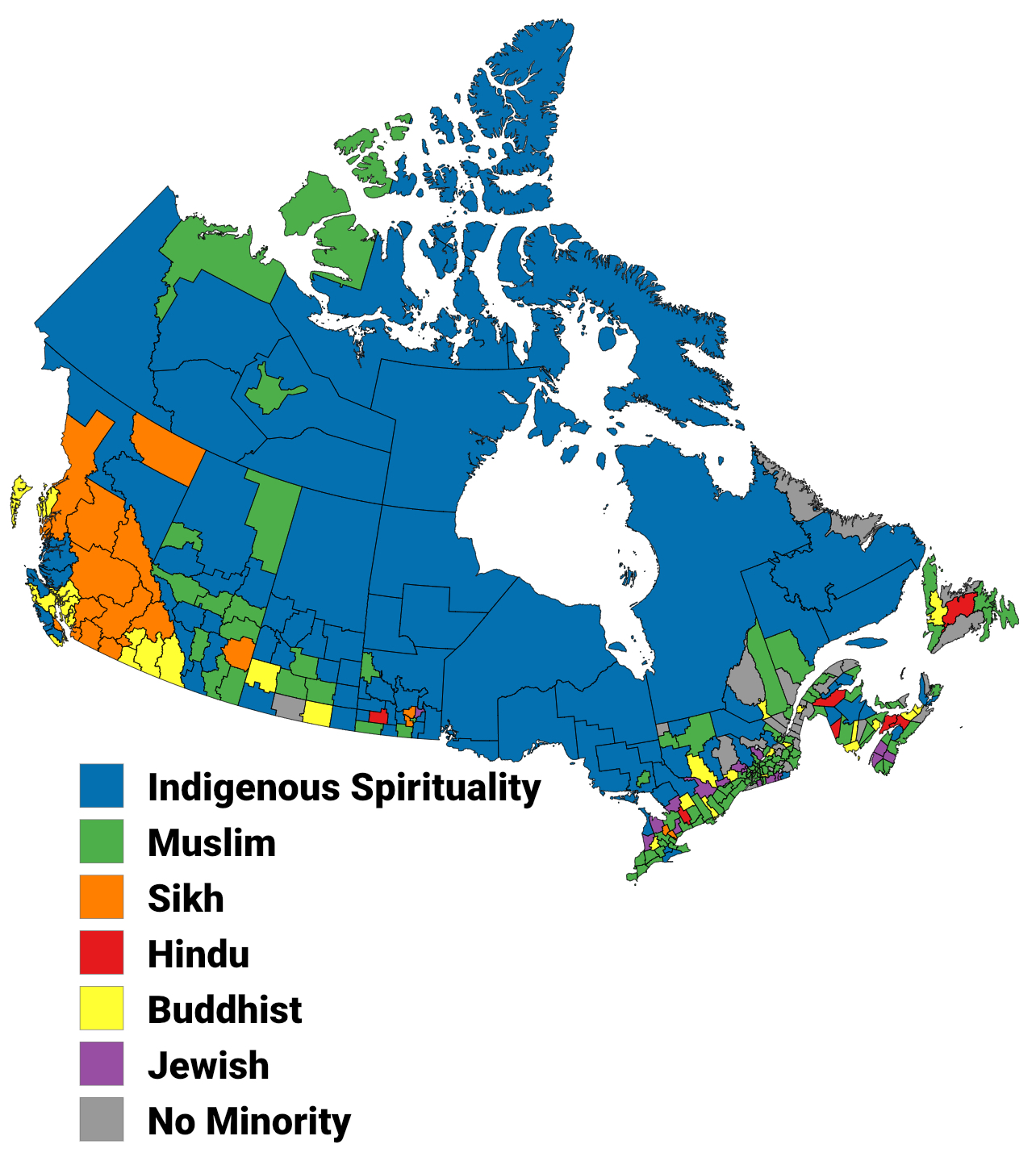
Largest non-Christian religion in Canada by census division, 2011 census

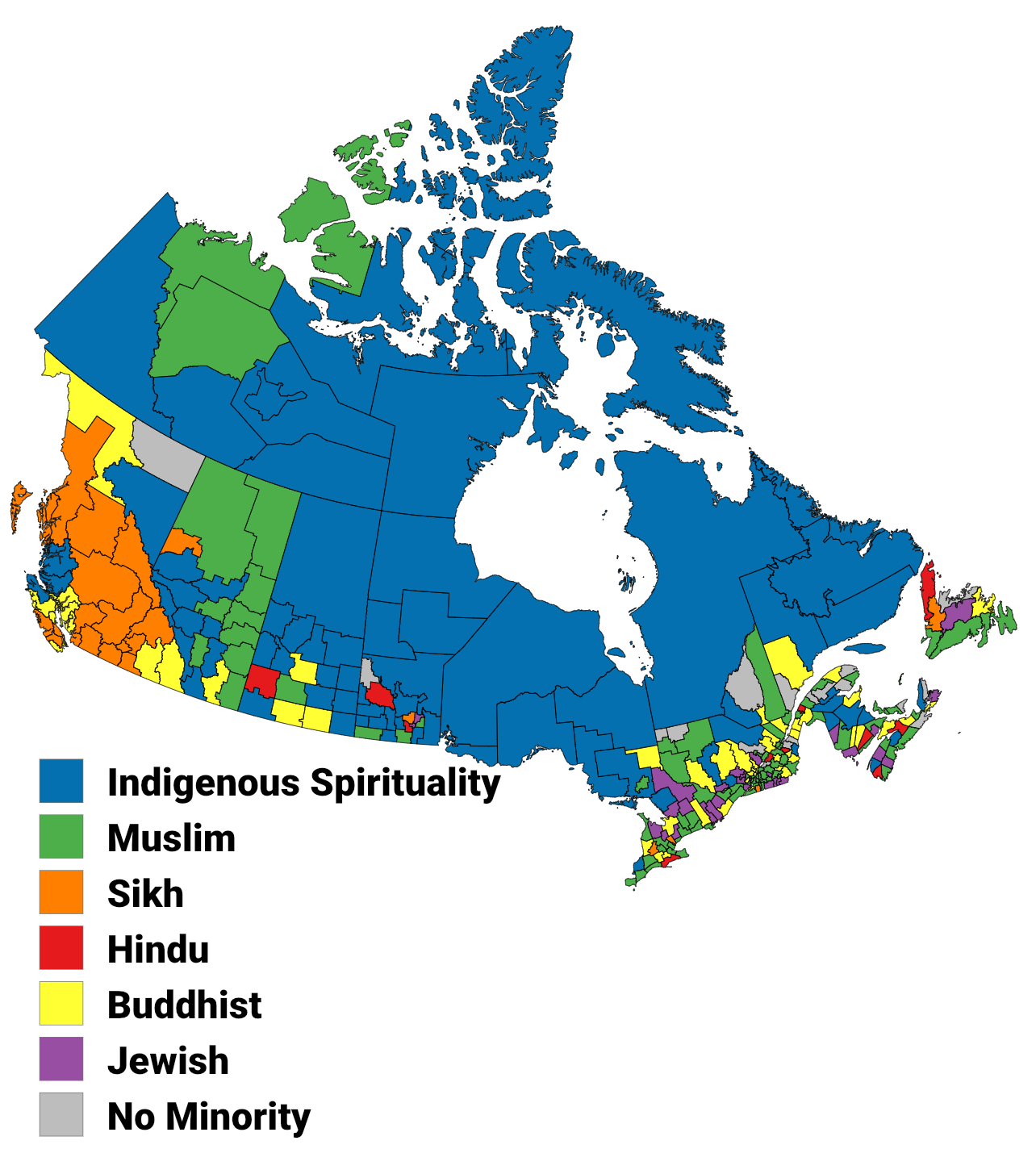
Largest non-Christian religion in Canada by census division, 2001 census

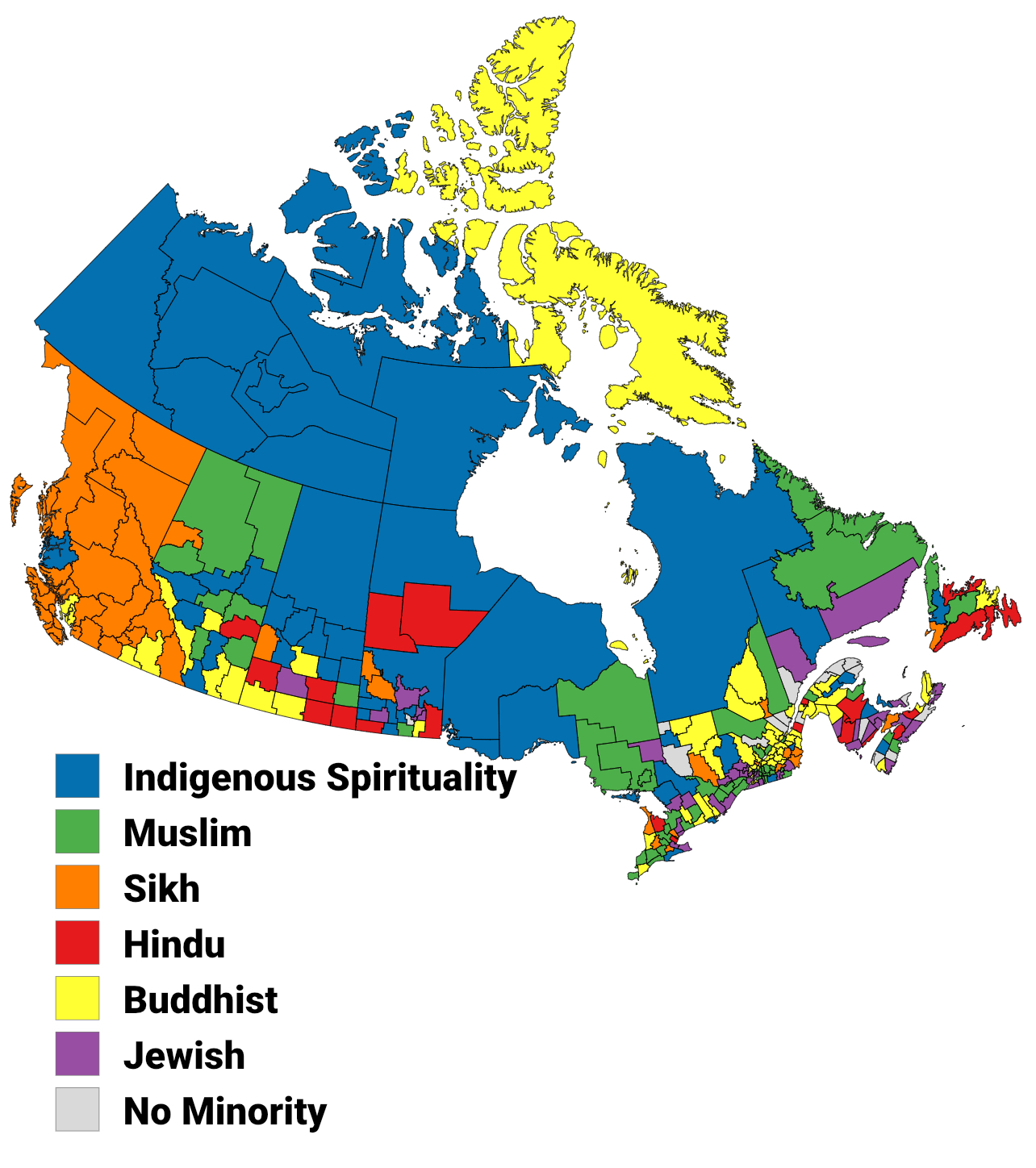
Largest non-Christian religion in Canada by census division, 1991 census

== Canada-origin or -centred movements ==
=== Hutterites ===
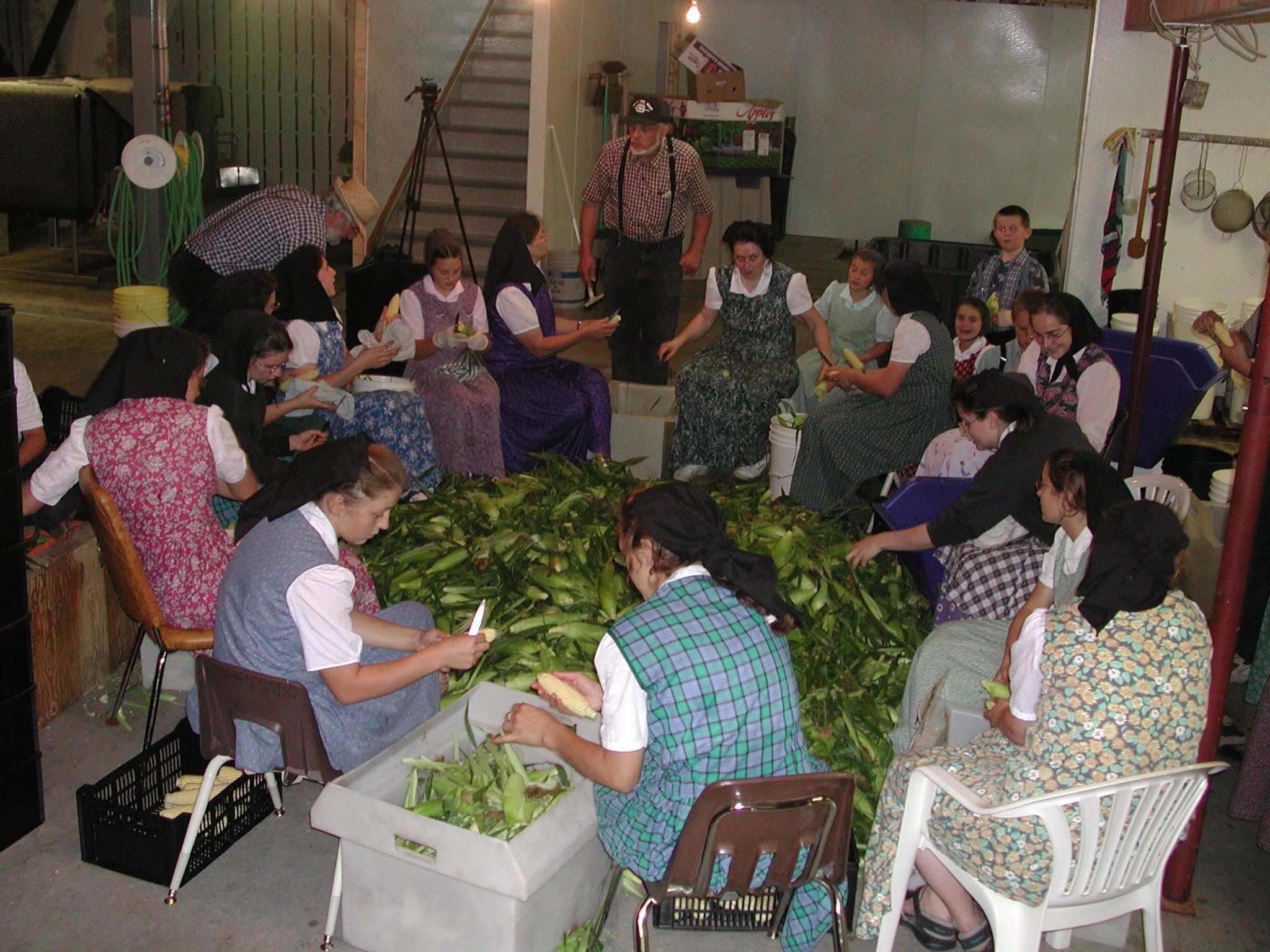
Hutterite women at communal work

The Hutterites are a communal German-origin ethnoreligious branch of Anabaptists, after series of migrations, almost all of them live in colonies in Western Canada.

=== New Tidings Religion ===
The New Tidings Religion or Wocekiye of the Canadian Sioux peoples is a reform revitalization movement, both indigenist and syncretistic, within Sioux Faith that appeared in 1900 and practised until the present.

=== Toronto Blessing ===
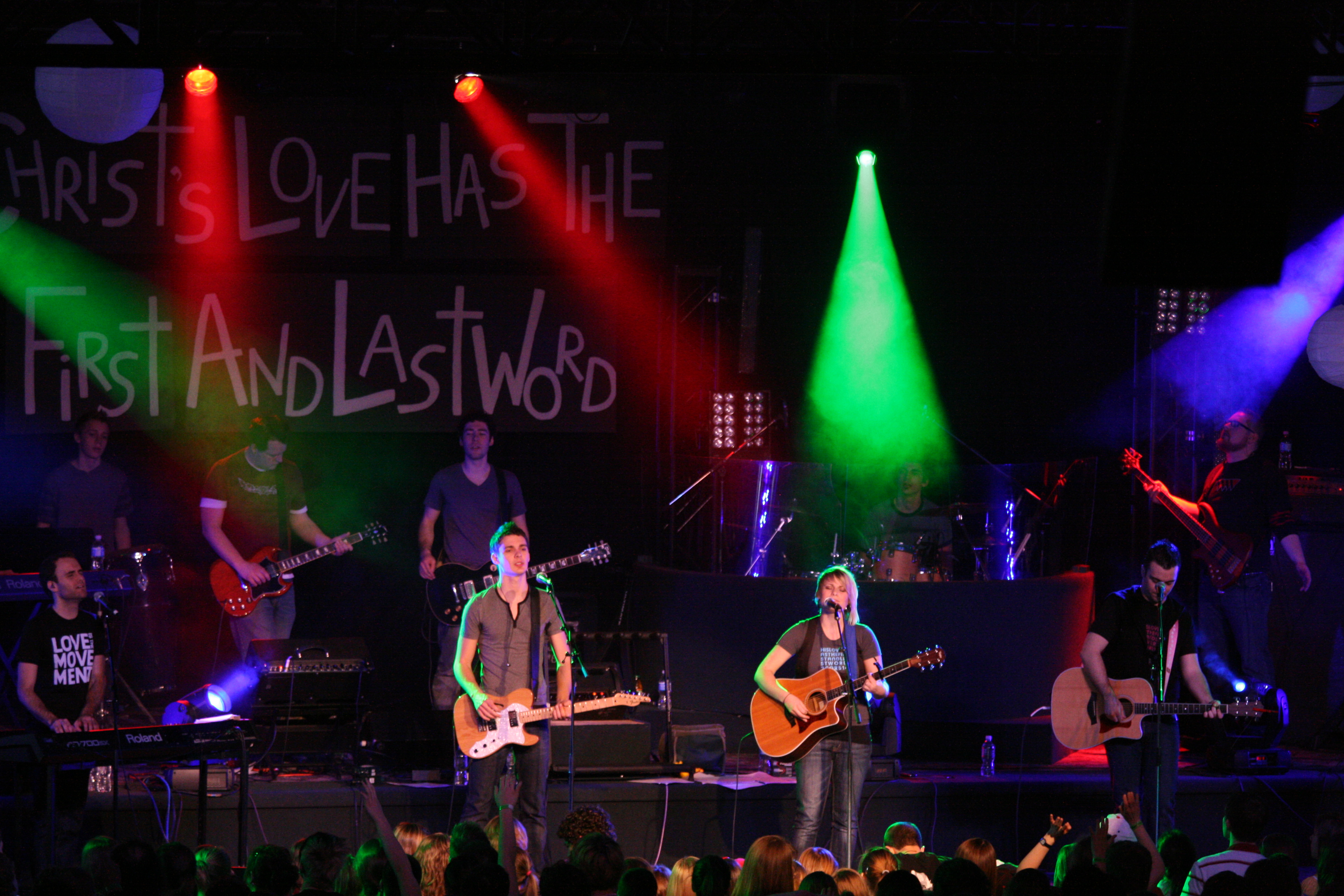
Freshwind band leading worship at Toronto Airport Church in 2008

The Toronto-Blessing is a neo-charismatic Christian revival that began in January 1994 at the Toronto Airport Vineyard church that later became a flagship church of global Catch the Fire World ministry.

=== Lev Tahor ===
Lev Tahor is a Jewish fundamentalist sect formed in the 1980s in Israel by Israeli-Canadian rabbi Shlomo Helbrans. In 2001 he fled to Canada, where he reestablished his community in Sainte-Agathe-des-Monts, Quebec. From 2003 to 2013, the movement located in Canada. It follows a strict version of halakha, including its own unique practices such as lengthy prayer sessions, arranged marriages between teenagers, and head-to-toe coverings for females.

== Age and religion ==
According to the 2001 census, the major religions in Canada had the following median age. The median age in Canada was 37.3.

- Presbyterian 46.1
- United Church 44.1
- Anglican 43.8
- Lutheran 43.3
- Jewish 41.5
- Greek Orthodox 40.7
- Baptist 39.3
- Buddhist 38.0
- Catholic 37.8
- Pentecostal 33.5
- No religion 31.9
- Hindu 30.2
- Sikh 29.7
- Muslim 28.1

== Census results ==
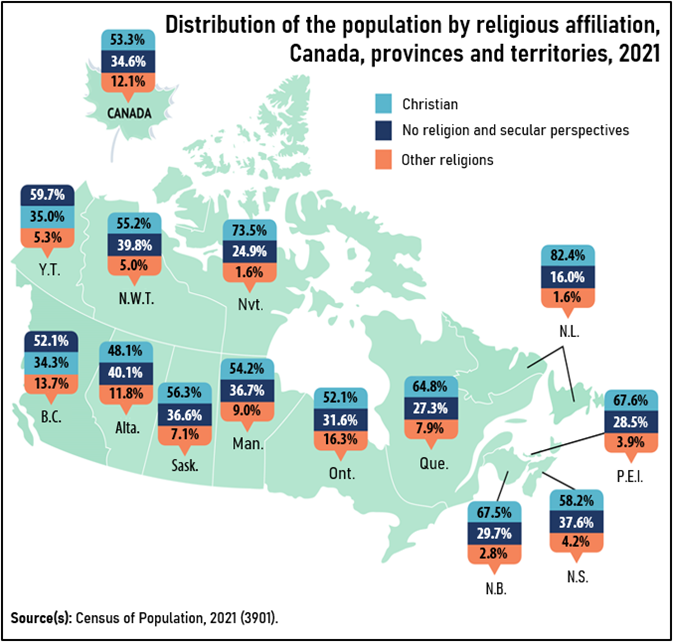
A map of Canada by province and territory showing the distribution of the population by religious affiliation in 2021

Census information about religious affiliation is derived from the long form census question on religious affiliation (question 30) which is asked once every ten years on every second census.

The actual question is;

"What is this person's religion?

The question indicated which denomination or belief the person identified with, even if this person is not currently a practising member of that group.

=== Raw data ===
==== National ====
In the Canada 2011 National Household Survey (the 2011 census did not ask about religious affiliation but the survey sent to a subset of the population did), 69% of the Canadian population list Catholicism or Protestantism or another Christian denomination as their religion, down 8% from the Canada 2001 Census, where 77% of the population listed a Christian religion. Representing two out of five Canadians, the Catholic Church in Canada is by far the country's largest single denomination. Secularization has been growing since the 1960s. In 2011, 23.9% declared no religious affiliation, compared to 16.5% in 2001.

In recent years there have been substantial rises in non-Christian religions in Canada. From 1991 to 2011, Islam grew by 316%, Hinduism 217%, Sikhism 209%, and Buddhism 124%. The growth of non-Christian religions expressed as a percentage of Canada's population rose from 4% in 1991 to 12% in 2021. In terms of the ratio of non-Christians to Christians, it rose from 19 Christians (95% of religious population) to 1 non-Christian (5% of religious population) in 1991 to 8 Christians (89%) to 1 non-Christian (11%) in 2011, a rise of 135% of the ratio of non-Christians to Christians, or a decline of 6.5% of Christians to non-Christians, in 20 years.

Religious denominations in Canada (1981–2021)
Religious denomination	1981 Canadian census		1991 Canadian census		2001 Canadian census		2011 Canadian census (Note: The 2011 data is from the National Household Survey and so numbers are estimates.)		2021 Canadian census	
Religious denomination	Pop.	%	Pop.	%	Pop.	%	Pop.	%	Pop.	%
Total population	24,343,181	100%	27,296,859	100%	30,007,094	100%	33,476,688	100%	36,991,981	100%
Total responses	24,083,495	98.9%	26,994,040	98.9%	29,639,035	98.8%	32,852,320	98.1%	36,328,480	98.2%
Christian	21,678,740	90%	22,503,360	83.4%	22,851,825	77.1%	22,102,745	67.3%	19,373,330	53.3%
— Catholic	11,402,605	47.3%	12,335,255	45.7%	12,921,285	43.6%	12,810,705	39%	10,880,360	29.9%
—— Roman Catholic	11,210,390	46.55%	12,203,625	45.21%	12,793,125	43.16%	12,728,885	38.75%	10,799,070	29.73%
—— Eastern Catholic	190,590	0.79%	128,390	0.48%	126,200	0.43%	75,140	0.23%	77,965	0.21%
—— Catholic, n.i.e. & n.o.s.	1,630	0.01%	3,240	0.01%	1,965	0.01%	6,695	0.02%	3,325	0.01%
— Protestant	9,777,465	40.6%	9,427,675	34.9%	8,654,845	29.2%	7,265,775	22.1%	5,109,210	14.1%
—— United Church	3,758,015	15.6%	3,093,120	11.46%	2,839,125	9.58%	2,007,610	6.11%	1,214,185	3.34%
—— Anglican	2,436,375	10.12%	2,188,110	8.11%	2,035,500	6.87%	1,631,845	4.97%	1,134,310	3.12%
—— Presbyterian	812,105	3.37%	636,295	2.36%	409,830	1.38%	472,385	1.44%	301,400	0.83%
—— Lutheran	702,905	2.92%	636,210	2.36%	606,595	2.05%	478,185	1.46%	328,045	0.9%
—— Baptist	696,850	2.89%	663,360	2.46%	729,475	2.46%	635,840	1.94%	436,940	1.2%
—— Pentecostal–Charismatic	349,885	1.45%	452,245	1.68%	386,510	1.3%	489,545	1.49%	402,955	1.11%
—— Evangelical–Methodist–Salvation Army	257,775	1.07%	308,860	1.14%	305,325	1.03%	290,620	0.88%	250,025	0.69%
—— Anabaptist–Hutterite–Mennonite	228,160	0.95%	255,865	0.95%	238,360	0.8%	220,290	0.67%	176,110	0.48%
—— Jehovah's Witnesses	143,480	0.6%	168,370	0.62%	154,750	0.52%	137,775	0.42%	137,255	0.38%
—— Reformed Bodies	104,175	0.43%	119,020	0.44%	115,735	0.39%	102,830	0.31%	79,870	0.22%
—— Latter-day Saints	89,870	0.37%	100,770	0.37%	104,745	0.35%	108,665	0.33%	87,725	0.24%
—— Adventist	41,605	0.17%	52,360	0.19%	62,880	0.21%	66,940	0.2%	68,935	0.19%
—— Non-denominational–Interdenominational	25,435	0.11%	35,095	0.13%	43,595	0.15%	45,410	0.14%	56,480	0.16%
—— Protestant, n.i.e. & n.o.s.	130,830	0.54%	717,995	2.66%	622,420	2.1%	577,835	1.76%	434,975	1.2%
— Orthodox	361,560	1.5%	387,390	1.4%	495,245	1.7%	550,690	1.7%	623,005	1.7%
—— Eastern Orthodox	333,760	1.39%	290,395	1.08%	303,025	1.02%	307,145	0.93%	326,855	0.9%
—— Oriental Orthodox	9,430	0.04%	17,710	0.07%	22,160	0.07%	36,070	0.11%	65,310	0.18%
—— Orthodox, n.i.e. & n.o.s.	18,375	0.08%	79,290	0.29%	170,060	0.57%	207,480	0.63%	230,845	0.64%
— Christian, n.i.e. & n.o.s.	137,110	0.6%	353,040	1.3%	780,450	2.6%	1,475,575	4.5%	2,760,755	7.6%
No religious affiliation	1,783,530	7.4%	3,397,000	12.6%	4,900,095	16.5%	7,850,605	23.9%	12,577,475	34.6%
— No religion	1,752,380	7.28%	3,333,245	12.35%	4,796,325	16.18%	7,745,535	23.58%	12,382,000	34.08%
— Agnostic	10,770	0.04%	21,970	0.08%	17,815	0.06%	36,285	0.11%	83,780	0.23%
— Atheist	4,450	0.02%	13,515	0.05%	18,605	0.06%	48,675	0.15%	86,385	0.24%
— No religious affiliation, n.i.e. & n.o.s.	15,925	0.07%	28,270	0.1%	67,350	0.23%	20,115	0.06%	25,305	0.07%
Other religions	621,225	2.6%	1,093,690	4.1%	1,887,115	6.4%	2,898,970	8.8%	4,377,675	12.1%
— Jewish	296,425	1.23%	318,185	1.18%	329,990	1.11%	329,500	1%	335,295	0.92%
— Muslim	98,160	0.41%	253,265	0.94%	579,645	1.96%	1,053,945	3.21%	1,775,715	4.89%
— Hindu	69,500	0.29%	157,010	0.58%	297,200	1%	497,960	1.52%	828,195	2.28%
— Sikh	67,710	0.28%	147,440	0.55%	278,415	0.94%	454,965	1.38%	771,790	2.12%
— Buddhist	51,955	0.22%	163,415	0.61%	300,345	1.01%	366,830	1.12%	356,975	0.98%
— Baha'i	7,960	0.03%	14,730	0.05%	18,020	0.06%	18,945	0.06%	18,975	0.05%
— Indigenous spirituality	4,210	0.02%	10,840	0.04%	29,825	0.1%	64,940	0.2%	80,690	0.22%
— New Age–New Thought–Pantheist	4,100	0.02%	5,810	0.02%	5,530	0.02%	5,795	0.02%	6,245	0.02%
— Personal faith–Theist–Universalist	2,840	0.01%	3,090	0.01%	2,870	0.01%	15,125	0.05%	80,910	0.22%
— Taoist & Confucian	2,775	0.01%	3,735	0.01%	5,450	0.02%	5,630	0.02%	6,550	0.02%
— Pagan	2,295	0.01%	5,530	0.02%	21,080	0.07%	25,495	0.08%	45,325	0.12%
— Zoroastrian	—N/a	—N/a	3,185	0.01%	4,955	0.02%	6,130	0.02%	7,285	0.02%
— Jain	—N/a	—N/a	1,410	0.01%	2,455	0.01%	3,320	0.01%	8,275	0.02%
— Scientologist	—N/a	—N/a	1,215	0%	1,525	0.01%	1,745	0.01%	1,380	0%
— Gnostic	—N/a	—N/a	765	0%	1,160	0%	870	0%	1,175	0%
— Rastafarian	—N/a	—N/a	460	0%	1,135	0%	1,055	0%	2,110	0.01%
— Shinto	—N/a	—N/a	445	0%	545	0%	915	0%	1,585	0%
— Satanist	—N/a	—N/a	340	0%	850	0%	1,050	0%	5,890	0.02%
— Spiritualist	—N/a	—N/a	—N/a	—N/a	—N/a	—N/a	4,315	0.01%	12,305	0.03%
— Other religions, n.i.e. & n.o.s.	13,295	0.06%	2,820	0.01%	6,120	0.02%	40,440	0.12%	31,005	0.09%

==== Province/territory ====
Provincial and territorial statistics
Province/territory	Christians	%	Non-religious	%	Muslims	%	Jews	%	Buddhists	%	Hindus	%	Sikhs	%	Traditional (Aboriginal) spirituality	%	Other religions^{1}	%
Alberta	2,009,820	48.1	1,676,045	40.1	202,535	4.8	11,390	0.3	42,830	1.0	78,520	1.9	103,600	2.5	19,755	0.5	33,220	0.8
British Columbia	1,684,870	34.3	2,559,250	52.1	125,915	2.6	26,850	0.5	83,860	1.7	81,320	1.7	290,870	5.9	11,570	0.2	51,440	1.0
Manitoba	708,850	54.2	480,315	36.7	26,430	2.0	11,565	0.9	7,440	0.6	18,355	1.6	35,470	2.7	10,190	0.8	8,570	0.7
New Brunswick	512,645	67.5	225,125	29.7	9,190	1.2	1,000	0.1	1,120	0.1	3,340	0.4	1,780	0.2	1,005	0.1	3,990	0.5
Newfoundland and Labrador	413,915	82.4	80,330	16.0	3,995	0.8	240	0.0	490	0.1	1,200	0.2	855	0.2	105	0.0	965	0.2
Northwest Territories	22,275	55.2	16,065	39.8	730	1.8	50	0.1	250	0.6	200	0.5	110	0.3	330	0.8	370	0.9
Nova Scotia	556,115	58.2	359,395	37.6	14,715	1.5	2,195	0.2	2,955	0.2	8,460	0.9	4,735	0.5	1,090	0.1	6,195	0.6
Nunavut	26,915	73.5	9,115	24.9	140	0.4	35	0.5	15	0.0	55	0.2	10	0.0	180	0.5	135	0.4
Ontario	7,315,810	52.1	4,433,675	31.6	942,990	6.7	196,100	1.4	164,215	1.2	573,700	4.1	300,435	2.1	15,985	0.1	88,845	0.6
Prince Edward Island	101,755	67.6	42,830	28.5	1,720	1.1	165	0.1	755	0.6	1,245	0.8	1,165	0.8	75	0.0	765	0.5
Quebec	5,385,240	64.8	2,267,720	27.3	421,710	5.1	84,530	1.0	48,365	0.6	47,390	0.6	23,345	0.3	3,790	0.0	26,385	0.3
Saskatchewan	621,250	56.3	403,960	36.6	25,455	2.3	1,105	0.1	4,410	0.4	14,150	1.3	9,040	0.8	16,300	1.5	7,540	0.7
Yukon	13,860	35.0	23,640	59.7	185	0.5	70	0.2	260	0.7	265	0.7	380	1.0	325	0.8	600	1.5

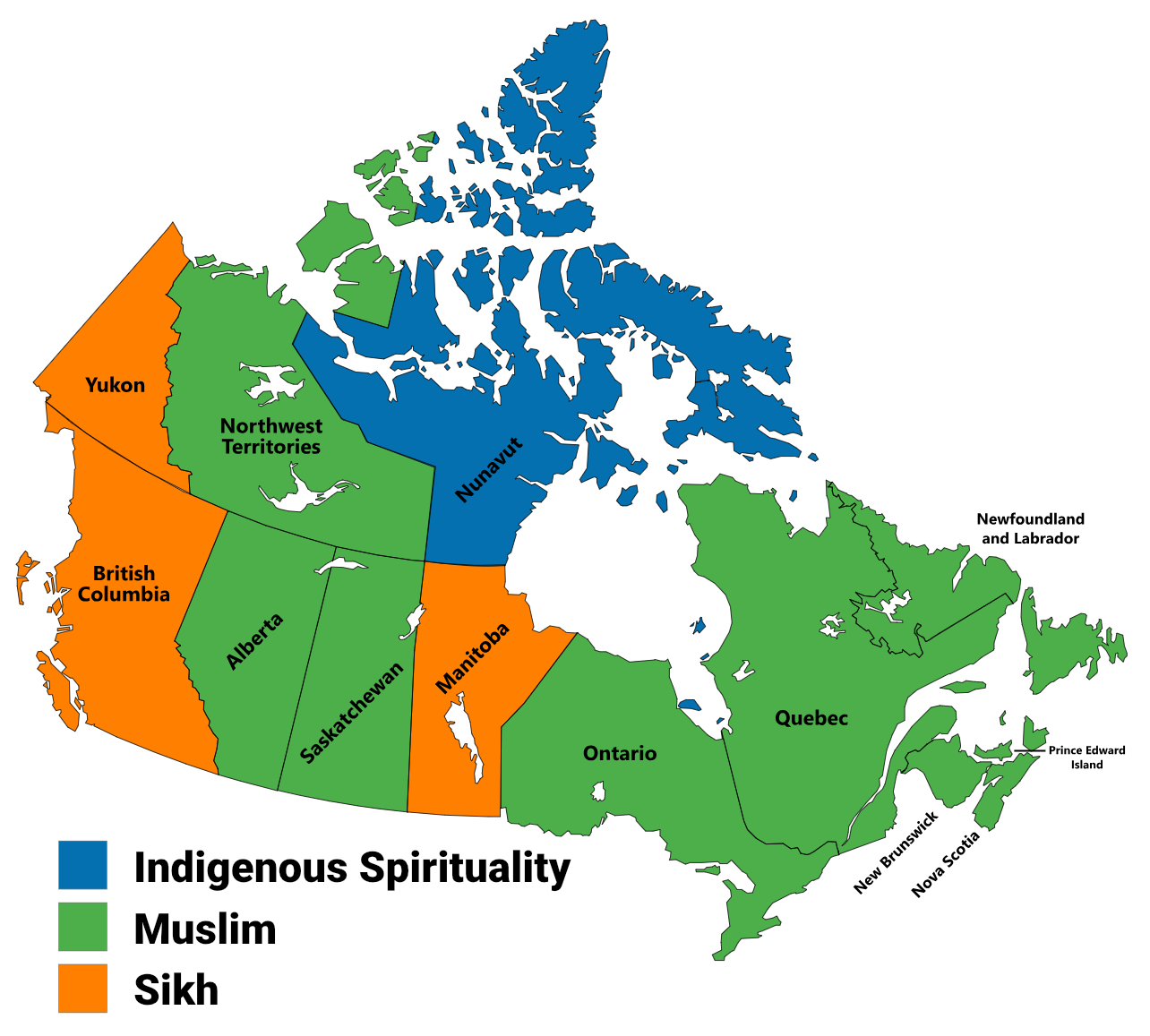
Largest minority religion in Canada by province/territory, 2021 census

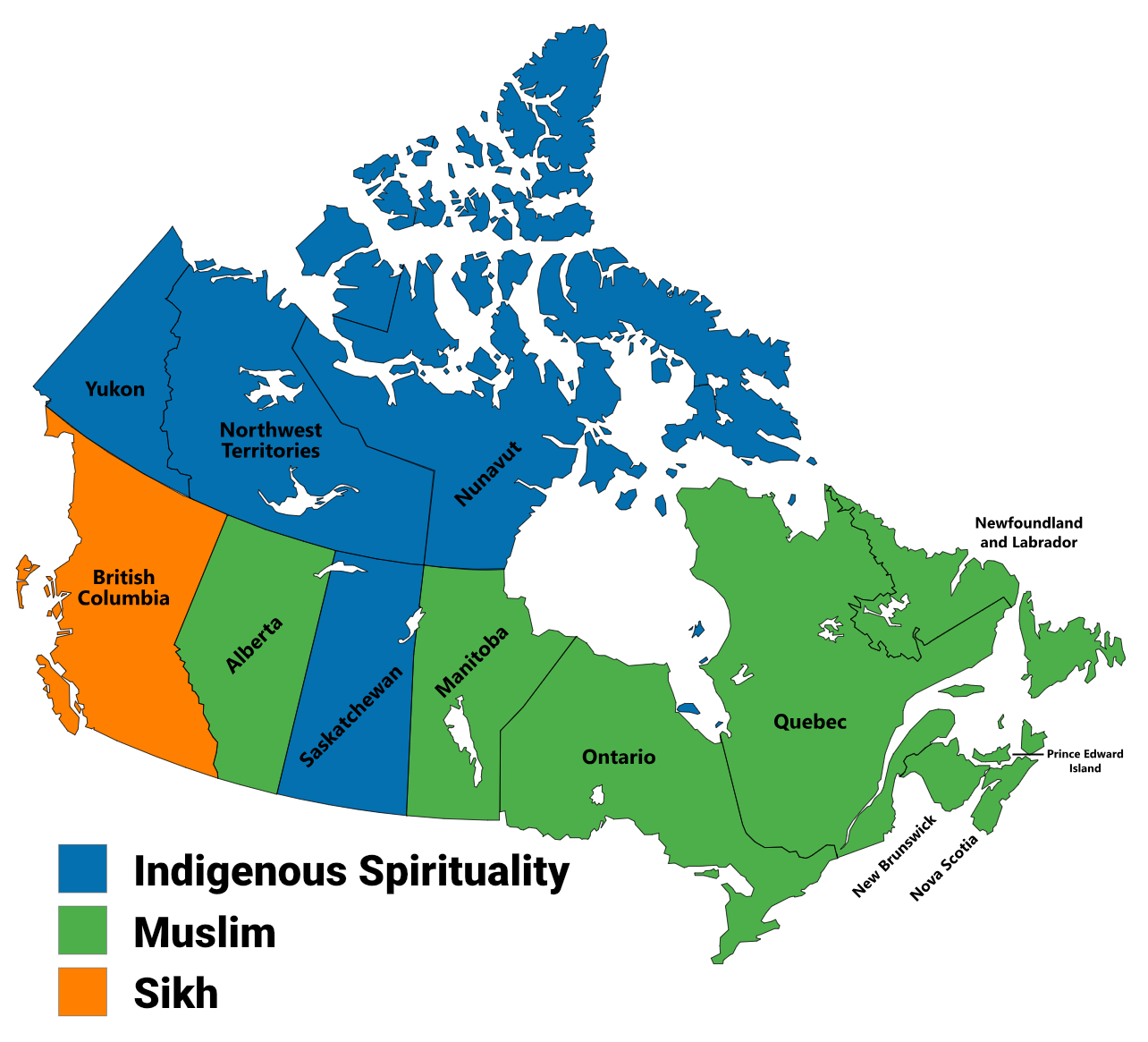
Largest minority religion in Canada by province/territory, 2011 census

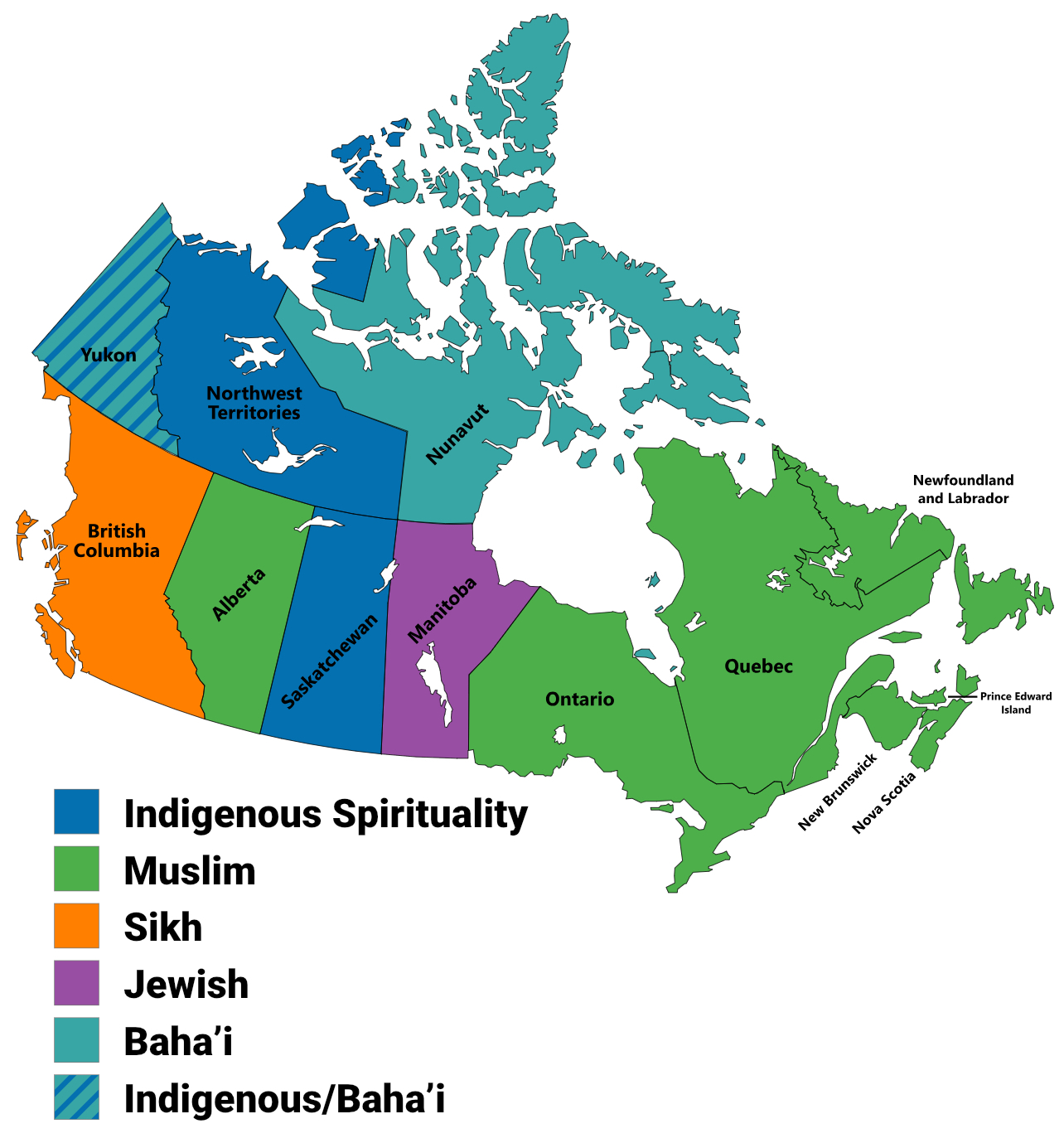
Largest minority religion in Canada by province/territory, 2001 census

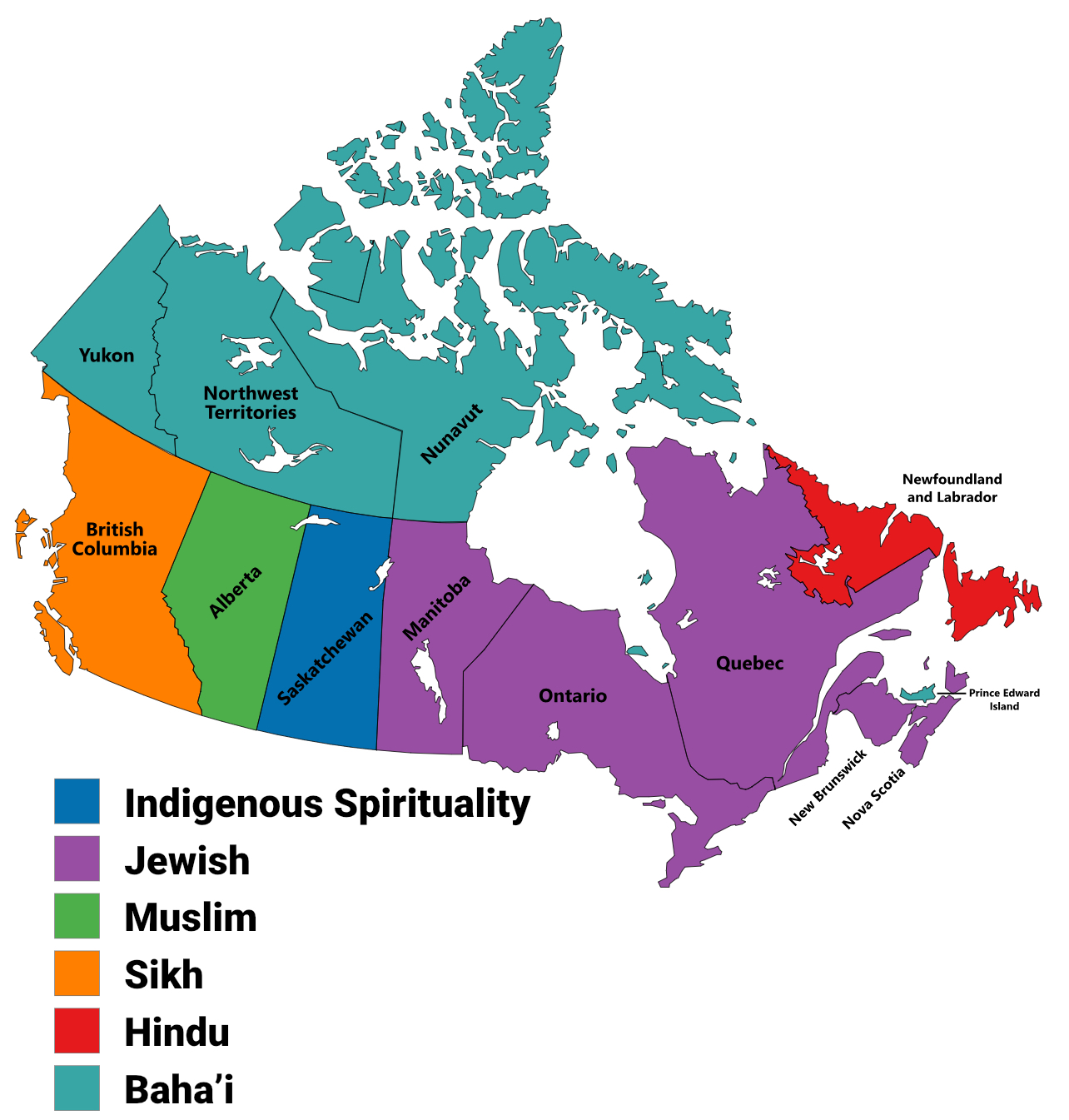
Largest minority religion in Canada by province/territory, 1991 census

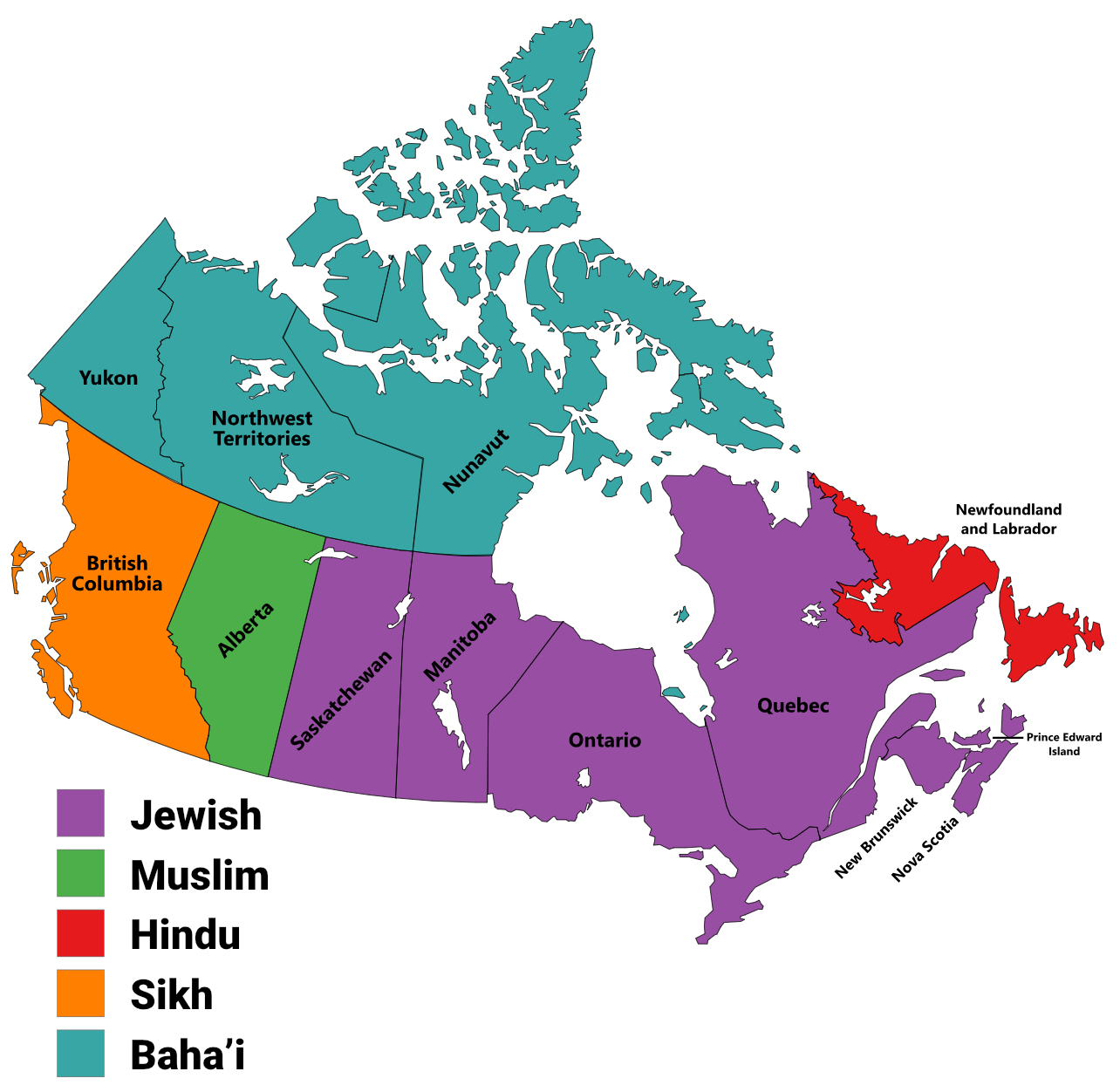
Largest minority religion in Canada by province/territory, 1981 census

== See also ==
- Humanist Canada
- List of prime ministers of Canada by religious affiliation
- Mouvement laïque québécois
