= Fall from Grace (1990 film) =

American television film

- Genre: Drama
- Written by: Ken Trevey
- Directed by: Karen Arthur
- Starring: Kevin Spacey; Bernadette Peters
- Music by: Charles Bernstein
- Original language: English

Production
- Executive producer: Jeff Franklin
- Producer: Richard L. O'Connor
- Cinematography: Tom Neuwirth
- Editor: Dann Cahn
- Running time: 100 minutes
- Production company: NBC Productions

Original release
- Network: NBC
- Release: April 29, 1990

Fall from Grace is an American television film about the lives of Jim Bakker and his then-wife, Tammy Faye Bakker, during the 1980s, starring Kevin Spacey and Bernadette Peters in the lead roles. The film, which depicts the events that led to the PTL scandal and the Bakkers' subsequent downfall, aired on NBC on April 29, 1990, as well as during occasional reruns in later years on the Lifetime Movie Network.

== Plot ==
In the 1980s, televangelist and PTL Club founder Jim Bakker and his wife Tammy decide to expand their PTL television ministry to include a village resort with an amusement park, which they christen Heritage USA.

However, during this time, the Bakkers are being investigated for various acts of scandalous behavior, beginning with Jim's 1980 affair with then-church secretary Jessica Hahn. They are also investigated for fraud (specifically, using followers' donated funds to support an upscale lifestyle as well as finance the Heritage USA project). These investigations ultimately led to a highly publicized scandal involving the Bakkers and the PTL ministry in March 1987, which gained national attention. The Bakkers are defrocked and the PTL ministry and Heritage USA are then taken over by another televangelist, Rev. Jerry Falwell. Jim is later sentenced to prison on fraud and conspiracy charges (but this is not depicted in the movie).

Subplots in the film deal with Jim and Tammy's constant bickering, as well as Tammy's drug abuse that led to rehabilitation at the Betty Ford Center.

Bernadette Peters, as Tammy, sings several gospel songs throughout the movie, including "Mercy Rewrote My Life", "Amazing Grace", "God Rides on the Wings of Love", and "His Eye Is on the Sparrow". Peter Matz arranged the music.

== Cast ==
- Kevin Spacey as Jim Bakker
- Bernadette Peters as Tammy Faye
- Richard Herd as Richard Dortch
- Richard Paul as Rev. Jerry Falwell
- Annie Wood as Jessica Hahn
- Beth Grant as Paulene
- John McLiam as Rev. Aubrey Sara
- Travis Swords as Patrick
- Jon Lindstrom as Brian
- Justin Lord
- Steven Barr as Bodyguard #1
- Rod Britt as Finance Executive
- Robert Broyles as Construction Foreman
- Randy Crowder as TV Director
- Mark Davenport as Real Estate Man
- Keith Joe Dick as Cowboy

== Production ==
The rights to the Bakkers' story were sold to NBC Productions in 1987. After Ken Trevey was hired to write the movie, his assistant interviewed the Bakkers. After the bankruptcy trial in 1989, the script was rewritten. Spacey at first declined the role, but finally decided to take it, because of "Jim's complexity — and a 3½-hour phone conversation with director Arthur." Because Tammy's weight fluctuated, Peters sometimes had to have extra padding; she wears false nails and five wigs. The movie cost $3-million-plus to make.

A Los Angeles Times article noted that both Peters and Spacey said "they had doubts about taking part in the show because of the caricature, Saturday Night Live aspect of their characters", but were assured that they would not play caricatures.

== Response ==
The Entertainment Weekly reviewer wrote that "Kevin Spacey as Jim and Bernadette Peters as Tammy are absolutely fabulous" but that, in a "miscalculation", the "movie they're in is so petrified of offending religious viewers that it pulls back."

== Awards and nominations ==
Emmy Awards

- Outstanding Hairstyling for a Miniseries or a Special— WINNER (tied with The Phantom of the Opera)
- Outstanding Makeup for a Miniseries or a Special— nominated
