= Rick Joyner =

Evangelical minister

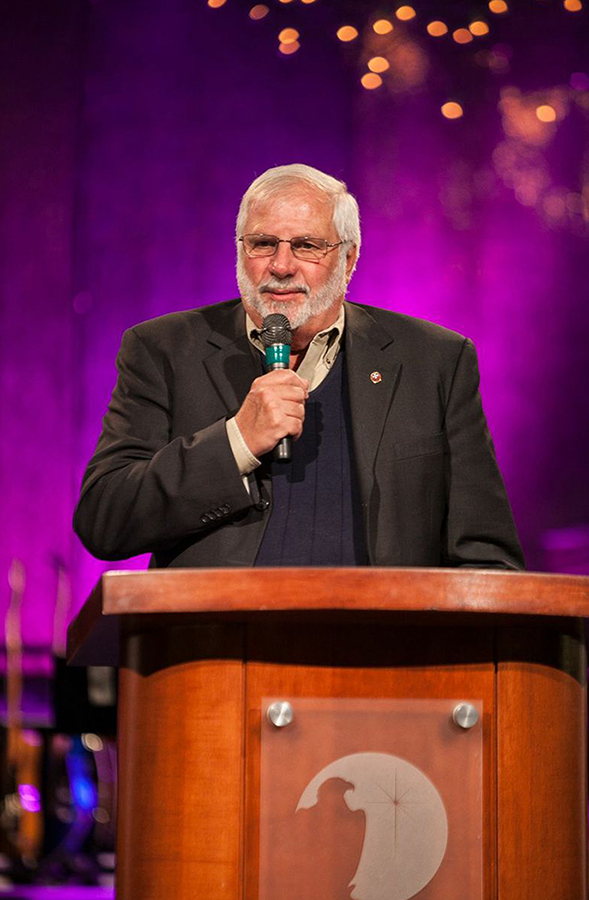
Rick Joyner

Rick Joyner (born 1949) is an American public speaker and author. He founded MorningStar Ministries with his wife in 1985.

== Early life and education ==
Joyner was born in Raleigh, North Carolina, and grew up in Richmond, Virginia.

== Career ==
With his wife, Julie, he founded MorningStar Ministries in Jackson, Mississippi, in 1985. Joyner is a promoter of the dominionist theology known as the Seven Mountain Mandate or Seven Mountains of Influence, which advocates the need for Christians to be involved in leadership in the seven spheres of cultural influence. Joyner promotes the ministry of Lance Wallnau who teaches on the Seven Mountains theology; MorningStar Ministries carries a long list of materials by Wallnau.

By the mid-1990s Joyner was president of MorningStar Publications, located at that time in Charlotte, North Carolina.

By 1994, Joyner appeared in news reports regarding his participation in plans to build a biblical theme park, in particular, with Reggie White, who had been unsuccessful in his attempts to purchase the Heritage USA theme park property.

The ministry hosts multiple conferences annually, with Christians from across the country and globe attending.

In 1997 Joyner purchased 320 acres of land in Wilkes County, North Carolina, near Moravian Falls and moved the headquarters of MorningStar there from Charlotte.

In 2004 MorningStar purchased part of the Heritage USA complex (originally established by Jim Bakker and PTL in Fort Mill, South Carolina) for $1.6 million. The complex has been renamed Heritage International Ministries Conference Center. Joyner also promotes the Kingdom Business Association which is located in the same complex.

Christ's Mandate for Missions (CMM) merged with MorningStar Missions in 2009.

=== Advisory and leadership roles ===
Joyner has been a part of the Apostolic-Prophetic Movement and an advocate for the Fivefold ministry and has been considered a leader in the movement since he published The Harvest in 1989, in which he predicted there would soon be a prophetic movement and a separate apostolic movement. In the mid-1990s Joyner was one of the all-male members of the international advisors-at-large to the evangelical Christian women's organization Aglow International.

Joyner is also the founder and president of the Oak Initiative. The non-profit organization is for Christians who desire "to Unite, Mobilize, Equip, and Activate Christians to be the salt and light they are called to be by engaging in the great issues of our time from a sound biblical worldview."

== Controversies ==
In 1998 Joyner's MorningStar Ministries was grossing $7 million a year, and that year it was denied a religious property tax exemption by the North Carolina Department of Revenue for an airplane, four tracts of vacant land, and two residential houses — one that Joyner lived in and one where Don Potter lived and had a recording studio. Department director John C. Bailey said, "[w]ith MorningStar there are a lot of tracts with costly improvements that affect tax liability significantly... If we did not limit exemptions, it would increase the burden on people, like you and me, who own homes that are not affiliated with any group." MorningStar appealed the Department of Revenue's denial. Also, Joyner's MorningStar Fellowship Church filed a $20 million lawsuit against York County, South Carolina, over the unfinished 21-story hotel on their property that Jim Bakker had started in the 1980s. MSFC filed an appeal of Judge Hall's ruling that "MorningStar has not provided substantial evidence to back up its claims." The building has never been finished and the county found the church in default after they missed a deadline to show their ability to fund the project.

Controversy has also accompanied Joyner's support for Canadian revivalist Todd Bentley. Bentley has claimed that God heals the sick, and sometimes even raises people from the dead in his meetings—including three people in Pakistan—reports of which were carried by Morningstar TV which is part of Joyner's Heritage International Ministries. ABC's Nightline reporting concerning the "Lakeland Revival," before his marital problems became news, stated that "Not a single claim of Bentley's healing powers could be independently verified." However, the Charlotte Observer reported on the same series of meetings, "The revival's media relations staff has tried to document healings. They e-mailed the Observer information on 15 people reportedly healed, providing phone numbers for each and noting that 12 had received medical verification. The Observer contacted five, plus three whose names were not provided, including Burgee. Each said God had healed them through, or related to, Bentley and the Lakeland services."

Joyner's public relationship with Bentley began when he appeared on stage in Lakeland with other church leaders to lay hands on Bentley. After Bentley's divorce from his wife in 2008, Joyner decided to oversee the process of "restoring" Bentley along with Jack Deere and Bill Johnson. Joyner made the announcement of the remarriage on March 9, 2009. He also released a statement as to why he chose to be a part of the restoration.

There has also been some controversy about Joyner joining the Knights of Malta (Russian tradition of the Knights Hospitaller). Joyner released a long statement explaining who they are and why he joined.

In March 2021, Joyner urged Christians to own weapons to prepare for what he believes will be an inevitable civil war in the United States against those who he says stole the 2020 presidential election from the Republicans.

== In popular culture ==
In April 2013, Joyner and his daughter, Anna Jane Joyner, a climate leader and founder of Good Energy, participated in the Showtime documentary Years of Living Dangerously, a nine-part series focused on climate change. In the fourth episode, celebrity Ian Somerhalder follows Anna Jane as she tries to persuade her father, a climate change denier, to change his mind about global warming.

== Personal life ==
Rick and his wife, Julie, have five children: Anna Jane, Aaryn, Amber, Ben, and Sam. All of his children disagree with his political views.

== See also ==
- New Apostolic Reformation
- Independent Network Charismatic Christianity
