= PTL Satellite Network =

Evangelical Christian television network

PTL Satellite Network, or PTL Television Network
- Type: Religious Broadcasting Network
- Country: United States
- Availability: National
- Key people: Jim Bakker—President; Richard Dortch—Chairman
- Launch date: 1974; 1990: as The New Inspirational Network (INSP); 2015: as PTL Television Network

The PTL Television Network, often referred to as simply PTL, is an American evangelical Christian television network originally located in Fort Mill, South Carolina, founded by Jim and Tammy Faye Bakker in 1974 and dedicated in April 1977. During PTL's 14-year history, the Bakkers, as hosts of the network's flagship talk show, The PTL Club, became two of the most recognizable and highly-rated televangelists in the U.S. However, PTL collapsed in 1987 after a former church secretary, Jessica Hahn, accused the evangelist of rape, while later financial scandals revealed that the couple had used the nonprofit PTL's donations to fund an opulent personal lifestyle. Bakker went to prison for embezzlement in 1989.

After PTL declared bankruptcy, the cable network was sold in 1989 to Morris Cerullo World Evangelism of San Diego, California, and was eventually named INSP, now headquartered at facilities that were constructed in Indian Land, South Carolina. Twenty years after his release from prison, Bakker, having gone back into television evangelism, purchased PTL's trademark and logo and relaunched the network.

== History ==
In 1960, Jim Bakker met Tammy Faye LaValley while both were students at North Central University in Minneapolis, Minnesota. Tammy Faye worked in a boutique, while Jim found work in a restaurant inside a Minneapolis department store. They were married on April 1, 1961, and left Bible college to become itinerant evangelists.

In 1966, the Bakkers began working at Pat Robertson's Christian Broadcasting Network (CBN) in Virginia Beach, Virginia, which at the time barely reached an audience of thousands. The Bakkers would make contributions to CBN as a nationally recognized television ministry. The couple hosted Come On Over, a variety program hosted by the Bakkers and several puppet characters. The program was aimed at young children, whom they entertained with comic routines with the puppets, as well as airings of Davey and Goliath, a claymation Bible-story series. Due to the success of Come On Over, Robertson made Bakker the host of a new prime-time talk show called The 700 Club, which would gradually become CBN's flagship program, and become syndicated on numerous cable channels and network affiliates.

In the early 1970s, the Bakkers left CBN and traveled, holding telethons at Christian TV stations. In Charlotte, North Carolina, the Bakkers set up Trinity Broadcasting Network (TBN) with TV executives Sandy and Martha Wheeler, who began airing a program called Praise the Lord on Charlotte station WRET. The Bakkers moved to California, teaming with their former youth pastors Paul and Jan Crouch, to create the Praise the Lord show for the Crouches' Trinity Broadcasting Systems in California. However, the relationship only lasted about eight months due to a falling-out between Jim Bakker and Paul Crouch, causing the Bakkers to leave this ministry as well. The California entity was rebranded as TBN, which would grow to become the world's largest faith-based network in later years. Before leaving and moving east, the Bakkers managed to retain the rights to use the initials "PTL".

What began as a local TV broadcast in Charlotte changed when several members of the Bakker's staff in California moved to Charlotte in February 1974 and with the local ex-TBN staff, into what became known as the PTL Television Network. The parent company changed its name to Heritage Village Church & Missionary Fellowship in 1976–77. The purchase of the Heritage USA properties in Fort Mill, South Carolina, began at that time. PTL uplinked from Heritage Village on Park Road in Charlotte until December 1986. The Heritage Village Property was sold and satellite and video tape editing operations moved to Heritage USA.

== Scandals ==
PTL's fund raising activities between 1984 and 1987 underwent scrutiny by The Charlotte Observer, eventually leading to criminal charges against Bakker. From 1984 to 1987, Bakker and his PTL associates sold $1,000 "lifetime memberships," which entitled buyers to a three-night stay annually at a luxury hotel at Heritage USA. According to the prosecution at Bakker's later fraud trial, tens of thousands of memberships had been sold, but only one 500-room hotel was ever completed. Bakker "sold" more "exclusive partnerships" than could be accommodated and raised more than twice the money that was needed to build the actual hotel. Much of the money went into Heritage USA's operating expenses, and Bakker kept $3.4 million in bonuses for himself. The $279,000 payoff for the silence of Jessica Hahn, who was mistakenly supposed to be a Bakker staff member, was paid by Tammy Faye's later husband, Roe Messner. Hahn was actually a onetime acquaintance of Bakker set up by a "friend" in 1980.

Bakker, who apparently made all of the financial decisions for PTL, allegedly kept two sets of books to conceal the accounting irregularities. Reporters from the Observer, led by Charles Shepard, investigated and published a series of articles on the PTL organization's finances.

On March 19, 1987, following the revelation of a payoff to Hahn to keep secret her allegation that Bakker had raped her, Bakker resigned from PTL. Bakker acknowledges that he had a sexual encounter with Hahn at a hotel room in Clearwater Beach, Florida, but denies raping her. Following Bakker's resignation as head of PTL, he was succeeded in late March 1987 by Jerry Falwell. Later that summer, as donations sharply declined in the wake of Bakker's resignation and the end of The PTL Club, Falwell raised $20 million to help keep Heritage USA solvent, including a well-publicized waterslide plunge there. Falwell called Bakker a liar, an embezzler, a sexual deviant, and "the greatest scab and cancer on the face of Christianity in 2,000 years of church history." In 1988, Falwell said that the Bakker scandal had "strengthened broadcast evangelism and made Christianity stronger, more mature and more committed." Bakker's son, Jay, wrote in 2001 that the Bakkers felt betrayed by Falwell, who they thought during Bakker's resignation had intended to help in Bakker's eventual restoration as head of PTL.

== Aftermath ==
Following a 16-month federal grand jury probe, Bakker was indicted in 1988 on eight counts of mail fraud, 15 counts of wire fraud and one count of conspiracy. In 1989, after a five-week trial which began on August 28 in Charlotte, the jury found him guilty on all 24 counts, and Judge Robert Potter sentenced him to 45 years in federal prison and a $500,000 fine. Bakker served time in the Federal Medical Center, Rochester in Minnesota, sharing a cell with activist Lyndon LaRouche and skydiver Roger Nelson. In early 1991, a federal appeals court upheld Bakker's conviction on the fraud and conspiracy charges, but voided Bakker's 45-year sentence, as well as the $500,000 fine, and ordered that a new sentencing hearing be held.

Jim and Tammy Bakker were divorced on March 13, 1992. On November 16, 1992, a sentence reduction hearing was held and Bakker's sentence was reduced to eight years.

In August 1993, Bakker was transferred to a minimum security federal prison in Jesup, Georgia, and was subsequently granted parole in July 1994, after serving almost five years of his sentence. Bakker's son, Jay, spearheaded a letter-writing campaign to the parole board on his father's behalf, urging leniency. Bakker was released from BOP custody on December 1, 1994.

On July 23, 1996, a North Carolina jury threw out a class action suit brought on behalf of more than 160,000 onetime supporters who contributed as much as $7,000 each to Bakker's coffers in the 1980s. The Observer reported that the Internal Revenue Service still holds Bakker and Roe Messner liable for personal income taxes owed from the 1980s when they were building the PTL empire, taxes assessed after the IRS revoked PTL's nonprofit status. Messner said that the original tax amount was about $500,000, with penalties and interest accounting for the rest. Notices stating the IRS liens list still identify "James O. and Tamara F. Bakker" as owing $6,000,000, liens on which Jim Bakker still pays.

== Rebirth as PTL Television Network ==
On July 1, 2015, Bakker's ministry announced that it had purchased the trademark to the former PTL name and logo and that the ministry's Generation Now Network, would be rebranded to incorporate the PTL name and logo. The channel was renamed PTL Television Network and is based in Blue Eye, Missouri. The network carries current Bakker programming; classic episodes of The Jim Bakker Show as well as programs produced by other ministries. It is broadcast in 720p high definition, and is available on Amazon Fire TV, Roku, Apple TV and carried by cable television systems nationwide.
