= Harold D. McNaughton =

Pastor Harold D. McNaughton
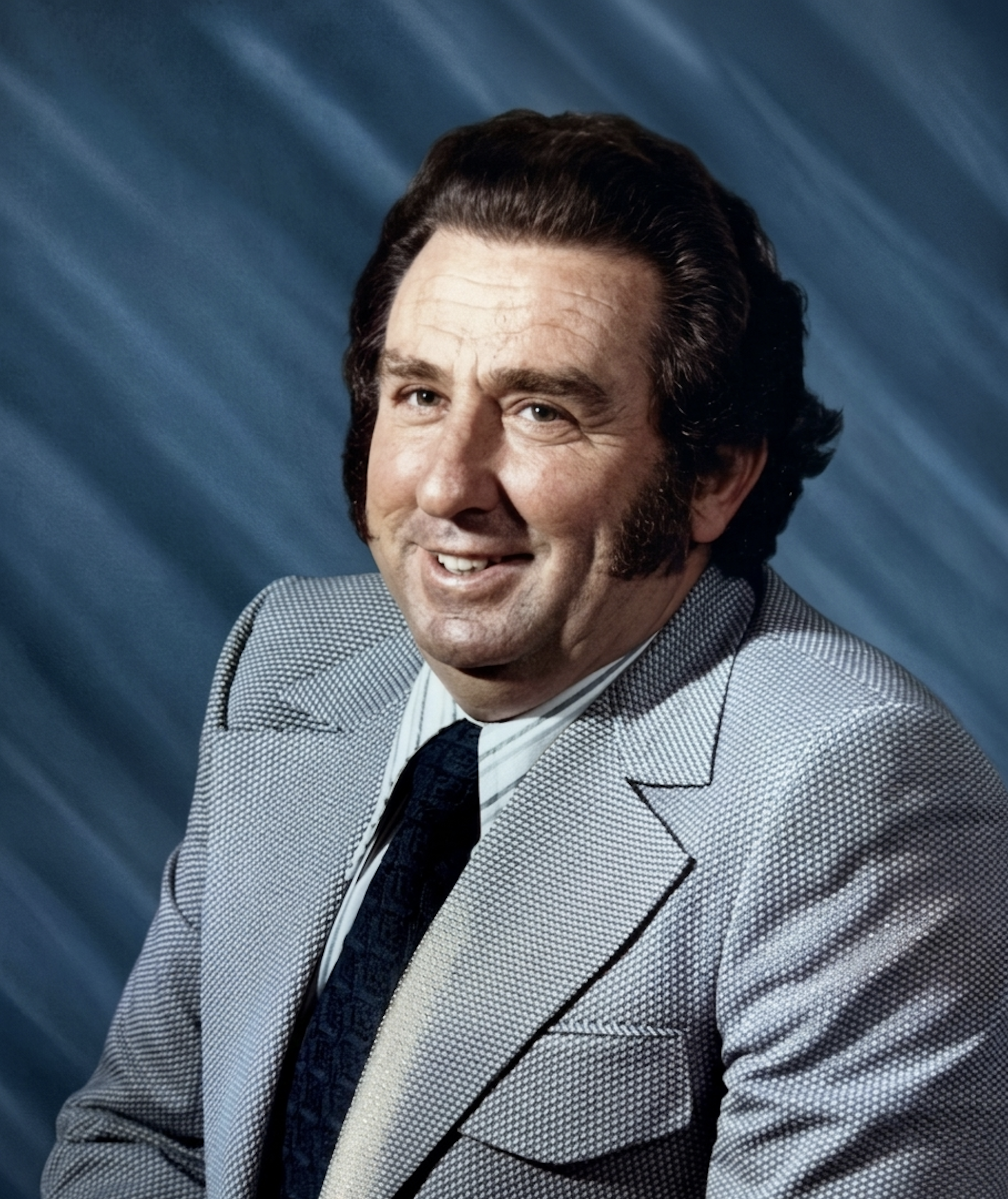
- Harold D. McNaughton, circa 1970s
- Born: July 14, 1926; Nebraska, U.S.
- Died: August 17, 1996 (aged 70); Bakersfield, California, U.S.
- Occupations: Minister, land developer, philanthropist
- Known for: McNaughton Specific Plan (originator of La Entrada, Coachella); founder of Vanguard University business program; senior lay leader at Melodyland Christian Center; associate of Pat Boone; Distinguished Service Award, Religious Heritage of America
- Spouse: Helen Rush McNaughton (m. 1946)
- Children: 5

Harold D. McNaughton (July 14, 1926 – August 17, 1996) was a California minister, land developer, and philanthropist whose 1988 master-planned development proposal (formally approved by the City of Coachella as the McNaughton Specific Plan) laid the foundation for La Entrada. La Entrada is a 2,200-acre, 7,800-home community described as "city within a city" and among the largest planned developments in one of California's fastest-growing cities.

McNaughton was born in Nebraska and raised in the Dust Bowl migrant communities of California's San Joaquin Valley. He overcame hardships that gave way to a career as a prominent developer, ordained Assembly of God minister, and philanthropist.

He is also noted for his senior lay leadership at Melodyland Christian Center, one of the largest charismatic congregations in the United States during the 1970s and 1980s, for founding and funding the business program at Vanguard University, and for his associations with prominent figures in evangelical Christianity and entertainment, including Pat Boone, Jim Bakker, and Ronald Reagan.

== Early life ==
Harold D. McNaughton was born on July 14, 1926, in Nebraska, to Fred Archie McNaughton and Merle McNaughton. His family legacy is one of faith. His paternal grandmother, Sarah Louise McNaughton, was a woman of deep religious conviction whose 1936 obituary described her as having "lived a life of prayer, faith and confidence in God." Harold's father was born in Muskogee (Indian Territory) in 1896, prior to Oklahoma statehood. His grandfather, John McNaughton, had settled in Indian Territory by 1894 as a tenant on Creek Nation land.

During the Dust Bowl years of the mid-1930s, the McNaughton family, natives of Oklahoma, left the region and relocated to the Arvin area of Kern County, California around 1934. Arvin was part of the great migration of displaced families that John Steinbeck immortalized in The Grapes of Wrath. Harold grew up in the area near Weedpatch, home of the federal migrant labor camp on which Steinbeck's novel was based.

In January 1938, when Harold was eleven years old, his father died at the age of 42, after only living in Kern County three years. Harold and his siblings were left to be raised by their widowed mother, Merle, in Arvin. Two years later, on June 29, 1940, the family suffered another loss when a fire attributed to defective wiring leveled the residence on A Street in Arvin.

== Ministry ==
From a young age, McNaughton was active in church life in the Bakersfield area. He later received his seminary degree in 1949 from what was then called Southern California College, an Assembly of God-affiliated Christian university in Costa Mesa (now Vanguard University). He had to leave the college in the 1940s in order to support himself and his family but eventually returned to complete his degree. He was ordained as a minister of the Assembly of God Church. By 1958, McNaughton was serving as a minister in the region.

He later became deeply involved at the Melodyland Christian Center in Anaheim, California, which was one of the most significant charismatic congregations in the country at the time. In 1969 Pastor Ralph Wilkerson sought to purchase the Melodyland Theater, a 3,200-seat theater-in-the-round located across from Disneyland in order to convert it into a worship center. McNaughton, acting as chairman of the church's finance committee, was present alongside Wilkerson at the pivotal Anaheim City Council meeting. The council voted 4 to 1 to deny the church's application for use of the theater. The church ultimately prevailed, and the Melodyland Christian Center went on to draw up to 18,000 weekly attendees at its peak. McNaughton served as a deacon and elder of the congregation, as chairman of its finance committee, and as a member of the board of directors of the Melodyland School of Theology.

McNaughton also served as vice president of Religious Heritage of America (RHA), a Washington, D.C.-based organization promoting the role of religion in American civic life. He and his wife Helen received the organization's first-ever Distinguished Service Award, presented in Washington, D.C., at the Washington Hilton Hotel International Ballroom Center, by W. Clement Stone, one of the wealthiest men in the country at the time. The ceremony was attended by notables including "Tennessee" Ernie Ford (as MC), Art Linkletter, singer Jeannie C. Riley, and singer Ethel Waters.

He was also a member of Gov. Ronald Reagan's financial advisory board and the Orange County Lincoln Club.

== Land development ==
By 1969, McNaughton had become a significant presence in the Antelope Valley, having developed 150 to 200 acres of residential and commercial property in the Palmdale and Lancaster area. He developed numerous buildings along the Antelope Valley Freeway and his offices headquartered there. He advertised land for sale in the Palmdale area in the Van Nuys News as early as 1968 and also ran for Palmdale City Council in 1970. During this period he also served as financial advisor for the Antelope Valley Lindsay Congressional Campaign, with the campaign headquartered in one of his buildings.

=== McNaughton Specific Plan ===
McNaughton later turned his attention to the Coachella Valley. In October 1986, McNaughton presented preliminary plans to the Coachella City Council for a 1,700-acre multi-use country club development south of Interstate 10, between Fillmore and Buchanan streets. The City Council voted unanimously to pursue annexation of 3,600 acres to accommodate the complex. City Planner Dan Fissori confirmed that McNaughton had already purchased the land and was "moving full speed ahead" on the project, and that McNaughton had agreed to fund the annexation process himself.

By July 1989, the City Council approved McNaughton's specific plan 3 to 2. McNaughton, described in the Desert Sun as an Indian Wells developer, said: "I feel that I've more than performed everything I've promised to do. I'm delighted." The proposed development was described as a $2 billion resort on a 1,000-acre site, to be built in phases, including two 500-room hotels, three golf courses, a commercial office center, a recreational lake, and an RV resort park.

The following month, in August 1989, McNaughton's plan was identified by the Desert Sun as "the largest development proposal in the city's history" encompassing approximately 1,000 acres with plans for 8,000 homes, two hotels, three golf courses, and a commercial office center. The project was formally designated the McNaughton Specific Plan. A 2004 retrospective in the Desert Sun recognized McNaughton for the foresight shown in securing this approval in 1988, with the site noted as offering some of the most spectacular views in the valley and credited as a contributor to the regional building boom.

=== Foundation of La Entrada ===
McNaughton's Coachella parcel attracted national attention in the late 1980s when televangelist Jim Bakker announced plans to purchase the land and develop a massive Christian resort complex. Bakker envisioned a 1,000-room hotel and a ministry destination to rival Heritage USA, his existing complex in South Carolina.

By April 1988, Bakker's plans had stalled. With the Bakker deal abandoned, McNaughton moved forward with development himself. This was a course of action he had already been pursuing since at least 1986, when he had purchased the land and was actively seeking city annexation and approvals. That decision set in motion what would eventually become La Entrada. Described by the City of Coachella as "a comprehensive amendment to, and expansion of, the approved McNaughton Specific Plan," La Entrada grew into a 2,200-acre master-planned community of nearly 7,800 homes, a new Interstate 10 freeway interchange, retail and office space, and nearly 350 acres of open space. The City Council approved the La Entrada project on November 13, 2013, and the development continues to build out today.

=== Continuation After McNaughton's Death ===
After Harold's death in 1996, his sons Dwight and Stanley McNaughton continued the family's development work in the area, including the 2,200 acres of east Coachella land their father had assembled. A 2004 Desert Sun profile of the major players in Coachella's development boom described how "the McNaughtons inherited thousands of acres of east Coachella land that their father, Harold, pieced together in the 1980s." As reported in the Desert Sun, Dwight, said of his father: "It was his dream to see a city out there. He doesn't get to see it, but it's still happening."

In the years following Harold's death, the duo worked on accumulating more land, including a federal land exchange with the Bureau of Land Management. BLM officials agreed to the swap because the federal lands being conveyed were isolated sections considered difficult and uneconomical to manage.

Their work culminated in an August 2001 when the Riverside County Local Agency Formation Committee approved the annexation of approximately 5,500 acres into the City of Coachella for the Desert Lakes project, a luxury golf community being developed by the brothers. The family eventually sold much of the assembled acreage to Fiesta Development Co. of Corona, which purchased 2,200 acres and developed plans for two golf courses, a shopping center, and 6,000 to 8,000 homes.

== Philanthropy ==
=== Vanguard University Business Program ===
Harold and his wife Helen both attended what was then called Southern California College. His son Hal McNaughton was attending the university in 1971 with a desire to major in business, but no business department existed at the time. A lunch between Hal, Harold, and the university's then-president Emil A. Balliet led to the founding of the Business Program at the school. This required a major investment as well, where Harold made a commitment: "You can count on it. I'll give it or I'll get my friends to give it." The first semester of business classes was offered the following year. Hal not only earned a degree from the program but taught at the university for many years.

The program has since grown substantially. Harold's investment created a legacy of more than 30 members of the McNaughton family attending Vanguard over the years. The program annually recognizes its top student with the Harold McNaughton Award for Achievement in Academic Excellence—an award his granddaughter would go on to receive.

McNaughton was known for this and other philanthropy. In 1994, McNaughton considered donating up to 300 acres of that land to California State University, San Bernardino for a permanent branch campus in the Coachella Valley. "You've got our total commitment to help participate in this," Harold McNaughton told the city council.

== Personal life ==
McNaughton married Helen Rush on June 20, 1946, in Bakersfield. Together they had five children: Harold Jr. (Hal), Riva, Dwight, Brad, and Stanley. The family was profiled in the Antelope Valley Press in April 1969, which described a household grounded in faith, music, and community. The children were noted as musically active and Helen was described as the anchor of the family's home life as a steady partner in Harold's business and community work.

Among his closest professional associations was a long friendship with entertainer and Christian activist Pat Boone. The two were business partners in an oil and gas exploration and production venture in the Appalachian region of Kentucky and Tennessee.

McNaughton served as Boone's personal representative during the 1987 PTL crisis, traveling to Heritage USA in Fort Mill, South Carolina, to convey Boone's willingness to serve as the new host of the PTL television program following Jim Bakker's removal. McNaughton was also referenced by Boone in his 1989 book The Miracle of Prayer, where Boone described McNaughton as a friend and referred to him as an example of prayer in secular business.

He maintained a primary residence in Bakersfield for more than 50 years and a second residence in Palm Springs for more than 15 years. He died on August 17, 1996, at Kern County Medical Center in Bakersfield, at the age of 70.
