= Todd Bentley =

Christian faith healer (born 1976)

- Bentley in 2008
- Born: January 10, 1976 (age 50); Gibsons, British Columbia, Canada
- Occupation: Evangelist
- Employer: Fresh Fire USA
- Spouses: Shonnah Bentley (m. 1995–2009) Jessa Bentley (m. 2009)

Todd David Bentley (born January 10, 1976) is a Canadian evangelist. He was a key figure of the Lakeland Revival and was in leadership of Fresh Fire Ministries Canada until stepping down in August 2008 following accusations of immoral behavior.

== Early life ==
Todd Bentley was born in Sechelt, British Columbia, Canada. He grew up in Gibsons, British Columbia, a small community on the western coast of Canada. As told in his autobiography, his parents divorced while he was a child, and he struggled with drug and alcohol addiction.

=== Arrest ===
Bentley was convicted at age 15 of sexually assaulting a much younger boy two years earlier. Although the criminal records of juvenile offenders in Canada were normally protected from public disclosure under the Young Offenders Act, the nature of his conviction became public when Bentley thought he was speaking off the record to a reporter who later published his remarks in a March 2001 magazine article from The Report.

Bentley publicly responded to this article in an interview that was published in Charisma. That article reported the following concerning a "revival meeting" Bentley had held in Kelowna, Canada, "The family of the assault victim had moved to Kelowna, and when they saw the posters with Bentley's name, they contacted local media. Bentley decided to address the local outcry by going on the 6 p.m. local TV-news broadcast. He admitted the crime on-air, asked for forgiveness, told viewers how ashamed he was, and how he was transformed five years after the incident by the gospel's power."

Bentley later said the original article, which appeared in The Report Newsmagazine, was, in substance, true: "'They were sexual crimes,' Bentley admits. 'I was involved in a sexual assault ring. I turned around and did what happened to me. I was assaulted too.'" At 17, Bentley was hospitalized again after his fourth drug overdose. At 18, he claimed that he changed his lifestyle completely due to his conversion to Christianity. Soon after this, he began his Christian ministry.

== Career ==
=== Fresh Fire Ministries ===
In 1998, the Fresh Fire Ministry group asked Bentley to give his testimony at one of their weekly meetings. Soon after, on Mother's Day 1998 Bentley took over leadership of the group, and it became more of a revival movement. He traveled to India, Africa, South America, Mexico and Europe taking part in crusades and revivals. This became Fresh Fire Ministries Canada which was led by Bentley until the time of his resignation in August 2008 after his separation from his wife. That ministry changed its name to Transform International in 2009. That same year, Bentley, with the help of Rick Joyner, created a new ministry called Fresh Fire USA. Fresh Fire USA leases space adjacent to Joyner's Heritage International Ministries Conference Center, where they have a FreshFire Healing Center and a local church, Secret Place Church.

=== Leadership of Lakeland Revival ===
Beginning on April 2, 2008, Bentley was invited by Stephen Strader, apostle and pastor of Ignited Church, Lakeland, Florida, to lead a one-week revival. The revival attracted up to 10,000 attendees nightly and around 30,000 over the week with Bentley as the primary preacher. The event turned into a four-month revival. In addition to showcasing Bentley's evangelism, the revival featured colorful light shows and power-chord Christian rock music. Faith healing was a major focus of the revival, inspired by biblical New Testament accounts of Jesus healing the sick. Healing testimonies were common at the Lakeland meetings. The hope of supernatural healing explains some of the Lakeland revivals' popularity, as there were many first-person accounts of miracles.

The Ignited Church also took a multimedia approach to publicizing the event, posting webcasts online. The revival streamed live via Ustream and received over 1 million hits in the first five weeks of transmissions. After the initial weeks, GOD TV, a Christian satellite channel, pre-empted its primetime programming and broadcast the Lakeland meetings nightly.

Strader requested the endorsement and support of New Apostolic Reformation leader C. Peter Wagner and his International Coalition of Apostolic Leaders, seeing Bentley as an apostolic leader. Though the movement's apostles were divided due to Bentley's volatility, Bentley and his revival gained the support of high-profile apostles including Chuck Pierce and Ché Ahn, and under Wagner's leadership, a public "apostolic alignment" ceremony was held in June 2008 to bring him under their wing.

ABC's Nightline reported that "Not a single claim of Bentley's healing powers could be independently verified." However, the Charlotte Observer reported on the same series of meetings, "The revival's media relations staff has tried to document healings. They e-mailed the Observer information on 15 people reportedly healed, providing phone numbers for each and noting that 12 had received medical verification. The Observer contacted five, plus three whose names were not provided, including Burgee. Each said God had healed them through, or related to, Bentley and the Lakeland services." Strader responded to the Nightline report with the following statement, "Strader said privacy concerns and laws forbidding the release of medical records have prevented revival officials from releasing complete information about the identities and conditions of people claiming to be healed." Bentley was also criticized for occasional violence done to participants in prior meetings. He was known to kick, hit, smack, or knock over participants. In one incident, a man was knocked over and lost a tooth. In another, an elderly woman was intentionally kicked in the face. Bentley held that the Holy Spirit led him to such actions, saying that the incidents were taken out of context and adding that miracles were happening simultaneously.

On July 9, 2008, ABC News' Nightline broadcast an investigative report on Bentley, focusing on his faith healing claims, finances, and criminal past. Following the report, Bentley took time off from the revival, but returned on July 18, 2008. Five days later, Bentley and Strader announced that Bentley would be leaving the revival permanently and that his last day would be August 23, 2008. Bentley's last day of preaching that year was on Friday, August 8, 2008, when he left Lakeland for his first, and only, day of "taking the revival on the road." He drew a small crowd in South Carolina during an open-air meeting at Heritage International. Three days later it was reported that Bentley, "has filed for separation from his wife, a former spokesperson said Monday, and will not return to the ongoing revival." Four days after that on August 15, 2008, the news of his resignation became public.

After the news of the resignation was released, many Christian leaders released statements filled with opinions on what had gone wrong with the Lakeland Outpouring. While they all admitted there were serious issues, they did not agree on the specifics as some came from old friends, others from those trying to be neutral, and still others who called Bentley a "false prophet." Religion scholar Matthew D. Taylor states that the event "raised searching questions about [C. Peter Wagner's] whole [New Apostolic Reformation] paradigm" as a number of the movement's prophets and apostles had supported Bentley because of personal revelations ostensibly from God. Wagner received backlash and some apostles left the International Coalition of Apostolic Leaders afterwards.

=== Divorce and sex addiction ===
Bentley announced his separation from his wife, Shonnah, in August 2008, and resigned from the Board of Fresh Fire. A statement released by the remaining board members said, "Todd Bentley has entered into an unhealthy relationship on an emotional level with a female member of his staff" and that he would "refrain from all public ministry for a season to receive counsel in his personal life".

Some of Bentley's Christian contemporaries called for him to step down in the wake of the scandal, stating that Christian leadership is incompatible with marital unfaithfulness. In response, a committee made up of Rick Joyner, Jack Deere, and Bill Johnson was formed to oversee the process of spiritually restoring Bentley's family. In November 2008, the board of Fresh Fire announced that, "Todd has yet to enter into a clear system of accountability with the leaders he identified." On March 9, 2009, Rick Joyner announced that Bentley had remarried.

A 2009 Charisma magazine interview with Rick Joyner refuted adultery claims while characterizing the relationship as wrong and premature. Joyner told Charisma that the new couple was committed to their marriage and would "continue to serve the Lord in the best way that they can". As the restoration process progressed, Joyner wrote this about some of his most outspoken critics, "Another level of shock came when I found that many who were the most critical and the most vocal of Todd's restoration had been through a divorce themselves, and most without going through any restoration for their failure. From my perspective, this was a shocking level of both hypocrisy and hardness of heart."

Todd Bentley would reportedly have sex with women after revivals and then pay them off later when they accused him.

=== Return to the ministry and denunciation ===
In 2010, Rick Joyner released Bentley into "limited ministry" and Bentley eventually returned to preaching and leading crusades.

Following adverse publicity of an impending visit to the United Kingdom in August 2012, Bentley was made the subject of an exclusion order barring him from entering the country. The UK government's home office stated that "The government makes no apologies for refusing people access to the UK if we believe they are not conducive to the public good. Coming here is a privilege that we refuse to extend to those who might seek to undermine our society." Local ministers had expressed concern about Bentley's unorthodox and often violent healing methods.

Bentley started a series of meetings in South Africa in April 2013. He returned to GOD TV, which broadcast meetings held in Tongaat, South Africa, on April 12, 2013. In May they broadcast some meetings in Pretoria and from Cape Town in June.

On September 21, 2015, Bentley uploaded a smartphone video to YouTube taken the night before at a crusade in Pakistan where he claims that a man was raised from the dead on the stage. He then went on MorningStar TV, showed the video and claimed that three men were raised from the dead that evening. The video does not provide medical evidence that anyone was clinically dead.

In 2019 a self-proclaimed "prophet" named Stephen Powell, who had worked with Bentley earlier in his ministry, released a video on YouTube stating that people had come forward to share with him that Bentley has continued in patterns of sin since his restoration under Rick Joyner. Bentley released a statement denying the allegations, however this video was since deleted. That video has prompted multiple responses from previously associated pastors including Rob Radosti, who has also publicly renounced his association with Bentley.

After complaints about his behaviour and teaching his case was reviewed by a panel of pastors in January 2020. This consisted of James W. Goll, Jane Hamon, Bishop Harry Jackson, and Don Finto. As a result of this they released a statement which said "Sadly, we see no signs of true, lasting repentance, Instead, we see a steady pattern of [immoral] behavior" which spanned the past 15 years, dating back to his time in Fresh Fire Ministries. In the same statement they declared him to be unfit for ministry. After initially agreeing to cooperate with the investigation, he then hired a lawyer to send a cease and desist letter to the panel, on receiving questions from the panel he did not reply. Bentley reported that his church attendance dropped significantly around this time and saw this as an injustice.

== Theology ==
Bentley highlights scriptural passages in his sermons. He emphasizes that spiritual or supernatural encounters in an individual's life are gifts from the Holy Spirit. He has stated that his priority is to help people experience the presence of God. He wants the "Holy Spirit to manifest His glory in such a way that people can't deny the presence of a living God and they have a true born-again experience." He also says: "Miracles and healings are evidence ... they are signs of the Kingdom, and if we don't have signs then all we have is a bunch of theology."

Bentley's testimony includes certain controversial claims, including encounters of meeting with Paul the Apostle. He has also preached about an encounter with an angel he called 'Emma', at an Assemblies of God church in 2001. The angel appeared in female form "and sprinkled 'gold dust,' illustrating financial blessings, on the congregation where he was preaching." In response to criticism about the Biblical inspiration of an angel who appeared female, Bentley wrote that it was God's choice, and not his own, that an angel appeared to him in that manner. Bentley explained: "In the case of the angel called 'Emma,' who I described as having mother-like nurturing qualities, some have automatically assumed that my doctrine is that I believe in female angels. This has never been the case! For whatever reason God chose to show me this angel in a female persona, He did. This isn’t to say that the angel was female. Angels are spirit and appear in many forms. Perhaps that’s the form God chose this angel to take for the purpose of the revelation He gave me. They are spirit beings of light, created out of God’s glory, without gender, and appear in whatever form God chooses to send them to us."

Pastor Strader of Ignited Church who invited Bentley to Lakeland said:

"We watch over everything. Everything that happens on the platform is scriptural ... The nightly message has been totally 100 percent nothing but Jesus. People are saved, people are healed, and Jesus is being glorified. ... Even some of my so-called friends are questioning my integrity, but they never come to the services. It's not fair just to watch [them] on TV."

=== Joel's Army ===
Bentley sponsored an internship program with Fresh Fire Ministries Canada called Joel's Army, in addition to having the words Joel's Army tattooed across his sternum with military dog tags, demonstrating a level of commitment to the Latter Rain doctrine of the Manifest Sons of God, (or Man-Child Generation), as preached by William M. Branham. The program's doctrine is associated with an interpretation of Revelation chapter 12—that in the last age before Jesus returns, there will be a generation of specially endowed Christians who will be able to do many miracles, and will usher in the reign of God. This is in the tradition of Branham and the healing revivals of the 1950s, overlapping with Latter Rain Movement theology.

=== Appearance ===
Bentley's physical appearance has been noted as being unconventional for that of an evangelist. He has dozens of tattoos, multiple facial piercings, and a preference for T-shirts over ties. His preaching style is also flamboyant and he is known for mannerisms including shouting "Bam!" during his delivery.

== Publications ==
- —— (2008). The Journey into the Miraculous. Shippensburg, PA: Destiny Image. ISBN 978-0768426069.
- —— (2011). The Reality of the Supernatural World: Exploring Heavenly Realms and Prophetic Experiences. Shippensburg, PA: Destiny Image. ISBN 978-0768426700.
- —— (2008). Kingdom Rising: Making the Kingdom Real in Your Life. Shippensburg, PA: Destiny Image. ISBN 978-0768427189.
