= Doug Oldham =

- Born: November 30, 1930; Indiana, United States
- Died: July 21, 2010 (aged 79) Charlottesville, Virginia, United States
- Genres: Christian, Southern Gospel

Doug Oldham (November 30, 1930 – July 21, 2010) was an American Southern Gospel singer and a member of the Gospel Music Hall of Fame.

== Early years ==
Oldham was the son of Dr. Dale Oldham, a minister in the Church of God. His grandfather was also a clergyman. He nearly died from pneumonia as a child.

== Musical career ==
Oldham was a musical performer for more than 60 years, with 64 albums to his credit, often traveling and performing with his wife Laura Lee. The couple produced a CD and wrote three books together.

=== Early years ===
Oldham traveled with Fred Waring and Waring's Pennsylvanians in 1951 and sang as a member of that group's Glory Voices Quartet.

=== Radio ===
Beginning in 1950, Oldham was a soloist on the Christian Brotherhood Hour, after having served as soloist for several years on the broadcast of Cadle Tabernacle in Indianapolis, Indiana.

=== Television ===
Oldham was a regular performer on The Old Time Gospel Hour with Jerry Falwell, The PTL Club with Jim and Tammy Faye Bakker during the 1970s and 80s, and traveled with the Bill Gaither Trio and the Slaughters during the 1960s. In 1975, he sang with the Speer Family for Christian concerts. He was also a performer on several of Bill Gaither's Gaither Homecoming videos.

=== Influence ===
The trials that Oldham faced in his life were the basis for "a number of songs ... including Something Worth Living For and Thanks to Calvary (We Don't Live Here Anymore).

== Ministry ==
Oldham was a minister of music, having been ordained in 1955. He served in that position in churches in High Point, North Carolina, Royal Oak, Michigan, Middletown, Ohio, and Indianapolis, Indiana.

In 1963, Oldham began ministering in evangelism through music. A newspaper article noted that he "served as song director and soloist for citywide preaching missions, camp meetings, youth conventions and concerts" across the United States and in other countries.

== Awards and honors ==
Oldham's album, Something Worth Living For, was named the best gospel album of 1968 by the National Evangelical Film Foundation.

In the mid-1970s, Oldham was granted an honorary doctor of divinity degree from the California Graduate School of Theology. In 2006, he was inducted into the Gospel Music Hall of Fame.

He was the recipient of two GMA Dove Awards and an Angel Award.

In 2007, Liberty University named a campus recital hall at the Fine Arts Building, the "Oldham Recital Hall, in his honor and established the Liberty University Oldham Concert Hall Scholarship Fund at the Center for Worship.

== Personal life ==
Oldham and his wife Laura Lee had three daughters, Paula, Karen, and DeeDee. He was the recipient of an honorary doctorate degree and was named an Honorary Colonel of Alabama.

== Discography ==
- I've A Song (TDE)
- Songs that Lift the Heart (TDE)
- Doug and Dr. Dale Oldham - Duets and Devotions (TDE 506)
- Songs that Touch the Heart (TDE 507)
- Requests and Favorites (TDE 509)
- The Lord is My Song - with the Leppien Sisters (Universal 3661)
- Doug Oldham Sings from the Hymnal (Universal 3667)
- Sings Songs of Joy, Real Joy - with the Leppien Sisters (Universal 66621)
- Doug Oldham with Jake Hess and the Imperials (Heartwarming 1930)
- Something Worth Living For (Heartwarming 1959)
- For Such a Time as This (Heartwarming 1977)
- A Rich Man Am I (Heartwarming-Impact 1997)
- I've Got To Go On (Heartwarming-Impact 3039)
- Sings Jerry Falwell's Television Favorites (Impact 3062)
- Have You Heard... God Loves You! (Impact 3064)
- The King is Coming! (Impact 3087)
- Bathing in the Sunlight of God's Love - renamed The Family of God (Impact 3099)
- Sings the Best of Bill Gaither (Impact 3143)
- Through It All (Impact 3156)
- Get All Excited... Go Tell Everybody! (Impact 3183)
- Christmas with Doug Oldham (Impact 3193)
- Inspiration (Vista 1235)
- Live (Impact 3211)
- To God Be the Glory (Impact 3240)
- Sings More Songs of Bill Gaither (Impact 3272)
- The Church Triumphant ... Alive and Well! (Impact 3324)
- Doug/Warm (Impact 3345)
- Live... with the Speers (Impact 3353)
- Doug Oldham & Friends (Impact 3393)
- I Am... Because (Impact 3430)
- Golden Treasury of Hymns for the Family of God (Impact 3496)
- Sings the Old and New of Bill and Gloria Gaither (Impact 3529)
- Special Delivery (Impact 3546)
- Holiday Song (Impact 3562)
- What's It Gonna Take (Impact 3707)
- Golden Treasury of Hymns Volume 2 (Impact 3755)
- Count Me In (Impact 3781)
- Hymns of the Faith (PTL 1857)
- All Rise (PTL 1996)
- Poet of Praise (Lovesong)
- He Saw Me (Brentwood)
- The Storyteller (Song Garden)
- Unmistakably Doug
- My God Is Good

== Book ==
- I Don't Live There Anymore by Doug Oldham (Impact Books 1973 ISBN 978-0914850380)
