= Jason Frenn =

American evangelist (born 1966)

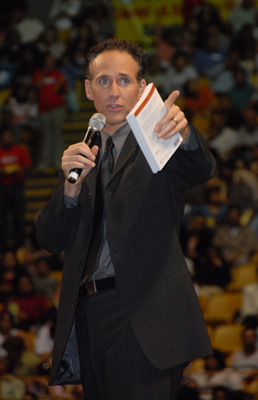
- Jason Frenn, speaking at LA FORUM Crusade.
- Born: October 24, 1966 (age 59); Los Angeles, California
- Education: BA & MA from Vanguard University; MBA from the University of Southern California (USC)
- Occupations: Missionary Evangelist, Author & Conference Speaker
- Spouse: Cindee Frenn (m. 1988)

Jason Frenn (born October 24, 1966, in Los Angeles, California) is an international missionary evangelist, author, and conference speaker, whose live ministry events have attracted a cumulative worldwide audience of over 7 million people. As a bilingual evangelist, he is widely known throughout the Spanish-speaking areas in the United States and Latin America. His ministry, entitled Power to Change, organizes citywide crusades. He is also an occasional guest voice for the Washington Post. Jason Frenn is a member of the Assemblies of God World Missions, a Protestant organization, but speaks for a wide variety of churches, denominations, and non-profit organizations. He is also a motivational and corporate affiliate speaker for the Ziglar Corporation.

== Personal History ==
Frenn was born in 1966 and raised in Southern California. His mother struggled with alcoholism, while his father was a bartender. At the age of three his parents separated, divorcing six years later. Jason and his mother moved to Big Bear, California, where his mother remarried a sixty-nine-year-old man who had been previously divorced five times.

Upon attending Southern California College (now Vanguard University), he met his wife-to-be, fellow student Cindee Larson. During their courtship they shared a collective desire to work as missionaries to the Spanish-speaking community. They married six months after graduation, and moved to San Jose, Costa Rica, in 1991. After completing an intensive period in language school, they began their missionary evangelism ministry, today called Power to Change. Their ministry holds citywide crusades throughout Latin America and, more recently, in the United States.

He holds a bachelor's degree in history and political science, and a master's in church leadership from Vanguard University of Southern California.

In May 2020, he graduated from the University of Southern California (USC) with a Master of Business Administration (MBA) from the Marshall School of Business. He was awarded membership into the Order of Arête. The term comes from Greek and "means virtue or excellence in attaining one’s utmost human potential. Members of the Order of Arête have distinguished themselves above their peers through campus or community leadership roles beyond those required for their programs of study, often making notable contributions to the university, academic discipline, community or world at large. In these leadership roles, members demonstrate significant depth and scope of responsibility, and they are recognized for upholding value and meaning over individual achievement. The award represents the highest honor accorded graduate students upon completion of their academic programs."

He and Cindee have three daughters.

== Ministry ==
The Power to Change ministry centers on the belief that through the power of God, particularly Jesus Christ, any individual can break free from addictions, family dysfunction, or destructive habits, and live a fulfilling life. The ministry initiates and manages open air crusades that present audiences with the Christian concept of salvation and spiritual living, with Jason Frenn as its primary speaker.

Over its two-decade history, the ministry has held over seventy-five crusades, most of them in Costa Rica, Nicaragua, and Mexico. The largest crusade to date occurred in 2004, at the Saprissa Stadium in San Jose, Costa Rica, with 45,000 in attendance over the week-long event.

Other notable crusades include the ministry's first U.S. crusade in May, 2006, at the Anaheim Convention Center, and its second, held at the Los Angeles Forum (both in Southern California) to mixed audiences comprising both English and Spanish speakers. To date, the Power to Change ministry has reached out to over 7 million people, with more than 700,000 conversions to Christianity.

Jason Frenn’s crusade messages are bilingual, with an interpreter partnering with him as he speaks. Jason often begins speaking in English for portions of his messages, with the interpreter delivering Spanish. However, with educational background in Spanish, Jason will frequently jump into speaking Spanish, while the interpreter quickly switches over into English.

In 2007, Jason Frenn's ministry expanded to include a daily Spanish radio program entitled Por Fin Soy Libre (Free at Last) on the Radio Nueva Vida Network. The evangelistic program has a potential weekly audience of 1,000,000.

In June 2008, Jason along with several of his crusade team members from Costa Rica granted permission by the Assemblies of God in Cuba along with the ministry of religion to hold two open-air outreaches in the towns of Holguín and Los Banes. Both meetings had a combined attendance of 12,000 people. In 2012, he returned to Holguín, Guardalavaca, and Bayamo and held three open-air outreaches with a combined attendance of 18,000 people. In 2014, he was invited back to speak at two open-air outreaches in Holguín and Guardalavaca.

In September 2009, Jason was the keynote televised speaker at the Crystal Cathedral's Hour of Power, a weekly evangelistic television program that reaches an estimated worldwide viewing audience of 20 million. He made several more appearances over the following twelve months.

On July 31, 2014, Frenn was the keynote speaker for the 100 Anniversary National Youth Convention and Fine Arts Festival in Columbus Ohio. On August 9, he was the keynote speaker for the Centennial Celebration of the World Wide Assemblies of God Fellowship in Springfield MO with 10,000 pastors and leaders in attendance and hundreds of thousands watching around the world.

On March 30 and 31 of 2017, Frenn was one of three keynote speakers for the World Congress of the Assemblies of God held in Singapore with thousands of ministers and delegates in attendance. On August 9, 2017, he was the keynote speaker for the 57th General Council of the Assemblies of God in Anaheim CA, a biennial council for their ministers in the United States.

Frenn has written six books. The first, Power to Change, has sold roughly 350,000 copies. His second, third, and fourth books Breaking the Barriers, Power to Reinvent Yourself, and The Seven Prayers God Always Answers(respectively) are published through Faith Words. BECOME WHAT YOU BELIEVE and POWER TO PERSUADE are published through Summit Books, LLC.

== Bibliography ==
- Power to Change
- Breaking the Barriers
- Power to Reinvent Yourself
- The Seven Prayers God Always Answers
- Become What You Believe
- Power To Persuade

== Criticism ==
Jason Frenn’s crusades are routinely scheduled in Spanish-speaking regions, such as Nicaragua, Costa Rica, and Mexico. In conflict with his ministry is the “Indigenous Church philosophy,” which suggests that missionaries and evangelists working in Latin America should be Hispanic. More recently Jason Frenn’s crusades have shifted to include North America, again aimed at Spanish-speaking audiences.

For years, Jason Frenn preaches that regardless of one's ethnicity, race or background, it is God who determines who is called to preach and not organizational philosophy. For that reason, he has continued to spearhead his crusades and ministerial outreaches to these regions.

== Notable television appearances ==
Trinity Broadcasting Network, Latin America
Costa Rica Channel 7 – Six o’clock evening news interview
Channel 7 – Buen Día, daily morning show in Costa Rica
Channel 13 – in Managua Nicaragua
Hour of Power (Crystal Cathedral), August 9, 2009, October 18, 2009, December 6, 2009, March 28, 2010, October 10, 2010
Celebration (Daystar Network), August 10, 2009, October 12, 2010
Life Today (Life Today with James and Betty Robison), September 2009

== Related links ==
- Home (ministry website)
