= Richard Dortch =

American pastor, missionary and criminal

Richard W. Dortch (October 15, 1931 – June 15, 2011) was an Assemblies of God District Superintendent for Illinois (1970–1983) and an Assemblies of God Executive Presbyter (1971–1985). Born in Granite City, Illinois, Dortch served as a pastor early in his ministerial career, and was also a missionary to Belgium (1959–1964), where he helped found and lead Emmanuel Bible Institute in Andrimont.

== Early life and education ==
Dortch's early life was marked by a strong religious upbringing. He felt called to ministry at a young age and pursued theological education at Central Bible College in Springfield, Missouri, graduating in 1953.

== Pastoral career ==
While pastoring in Alton, Illinois, in 1967, Dortch was elected as secretary-treasurer for the Illinois district of the Assemblies of God and served until 1970. He then was elected to serve as Illinois District Superintendent, a position that he held until he resigned in 1983 to work at PTL.

== Role at PTL ==
He became Executive Vice President of the PTL Christian evangelical television network in 1983, a network typically featuring speakers affiliated with the Pentecostal movement. During his time at PTL, Dortch worked closely with Jim Bakker, the founder of the ministry. He was responsible for overseeing much of the day-to-day operations of the organization, including its finances and programming.

The PTL (Praise The Lord) ministry experienced rapid growth under Bakker and Dortch's leadership, expanding its reach through television broadcasts and the development of Heritage USA, a Christian theme park and residential complex in South Carolina.

== Legal troubles ==
In 1988 he, along with other executives of PTL, was indicted on federal charges of fraud and conspiracy. In a plea bargain, Dortch pleaded guilty to reduced charges and was sentenced to eight years in prison, later cut to two and a half years. The charges stemmed from the misuse of ministry funds and deceptive fundraising practices. Dortch admitted to his role in covering up hush money payments to Jessica Hahn, a church secretary who had accused Jim Bakker of sexual assault.

== Restoration and later life ==
His ministry credentials were restored by the Assemblies of God in 1991. This restoration came after Dortch demonstrated genuine repentance and a commitment to ethical ministry practices. The decision to reinstate him was not without controversy within the Assemblies of God community.

Dortch wrote several books about personal integrity and restoration. His most notable works include "Integrity: How I Lost It, and My Journey Back" (1991) and "Fatal Conceit" (2012, published posthumously). These books detailed his experiences with the PTL scandal and his subsequent journey of redemption.

Until just prior to his death he hosted a long-standing two- to three-hours prayer service called "America's Prayer Meeting" on the Christian Television Network. This program became a platform for Dortch to share his message of redemption and the importance of ethical leadership in ministry.

== Death and legacy ==
Dortch died on June 15, 2011, in Palm Harbor, Florida. Despite the controversies that marked his career, he was remembered by many in the Christian community as a man who had faced his mistakes and dedicated his later years to promoting integrity in ministry.
