= Good Energy (non-profit) =

US-based non-profit organization

Good Energy is a non-profit organization and creative consultancy that advocates for and advises on the inclusion of climate change in Film & TV entertainment, arts and culture.

== History ==
Good Energy was founded in 2019 by Anna Jane Joyner, a climate communications and storytelling expert and non-profit executive. Since Joyner had appeared in the 2014 SHOWTIME climate documentary series Years of Living Dangerously, in 2018 Joyner was asked to serve as consultant on CBS's Madam Secretary, since the show featured a character based on both her work in climate and Joyner's relationship with her father Rick Joyner, an evangelical Christian megachurch pastor. TIME Magazine reported that this experience helped inspire the founding of Good Energy.

== Programs ==
=== Good Energy Playbook ===
Deadline reported that In April 2022 Good Energy published a screenwriting playbook titled Good Energy: A Playbook for Screenwriting in the Age of Climate Change developed with input from more than 100 screenwriters, producers, Film & TV creatives, climate scientists, climate justice leaders and psychologists to serve as a resource for portraying climate in scripted entertainment, in collaboration with organizations including Bloomberg Philanthropies, The Redford Center, Center for Cultural Power, and Creative Artists Agency Foundation. The playbook was helmed by a core team of co-writers—Good Energy's founder Anna Jane Joyner, writer Carmiel Banasky, and writer Scott Shigeoka—and it features quotations from the Academy Award winning climate allegory film Don't Look Up's director Adam McKay along with entertainment industry professionals including actor Mark Ruffalo, who is the co-founder of the climate non-profit The Solutions Project, and Norman Lear.

=== Research ===
In October 2022 Good Energy published a research report in collaboration with the USC Norman Lear Center which found that from 2016 - 2020, only 2.8 percent of scripted television portrayed climate change or mentioned any of the studied climate change-related keywords. The report and Good Energy's work have been a reference for reporting on climate in entertainment by many news cites including NPR, The Washington Post, and the BBC. In 2024 they released a new version of this report, now extended with a formalized test inspired by the Bechdel test that they call the Climate Reality Check.

=== Consulting and workshops ===
According to the entertainment industry trade newspaper The Hollywood Reporter, Good Energy consults on portraying climate in film and TV. In 2023, the organization expanded its practice to leading workshops, advising entertainment executives, and continues to collaborate on research, including a study with the USC Media Impact Project on the impact of Apple TV+'s Extrapolations, a streaming series focused on climate.
