= The PTL Club =

American Christian television program

- Also known as: Tammy Show; PTL Today; Heritage Today
- Genre: Religious talk show
- Created by: Jim Bakker
- Starring: Jim Bakker & Tammy Faye Bakker (1974–1987); Henry Harrison; Richard Dortch; Doug Oldham; Gary McSpadden; Ron Aldridge; Brenda Davis
- Country of origin: United States
- Original language: English
- No. of seasons: 14

Production
- Production locations: Charlotte, North Carolina; Fort Mill, South Carolina
- Running time: 60 minutes

Original release
- Network: PTL Satellite Network, The Inspirational Network
- Release: 1974 – 1989

Related
- The 700 Club, Praise the Lord

The PTL Club, also known as The Jim and Tammy Show, is a Christian television program that was first hosted by evangelists Jim and Tammy Faye Bakker, running from 1974 to 1989. The program was later known as PTL Today and as Heritage Today. During its final years, The PTL Club, which adopted a talk show format, was the flagship television program of the Bakkers' PTL Satellite Network.

== History ==
Jim and Tammy Faye Bakker had been in the ministry with the Assemblies of God denomination since the early 1960s prior to joining Pat Robertson's Christian Broadcasting Network (CBN), then based in Portsmouth, Virginia, in 1965. The Bakkers launched a children's show called Come On Over where the couple entertained viewers with songs, stories, and puppets. In 1966, Jim Bakker became the host of The 700 Club, a religious talk program that evolved from a telethon. The 700 Club would become the flagship program of CBN, which expanded from its original Hampton Roads station to include outlets in Atlanta and Dallas–Fort Worth by 1973.

Beginning in 1972, the Bakker-hosted 700 Club was launched in a dozen test markets, including then-independent station WRET-TV in Charlotte, North Carolina. However, the Bakkers departed CBN in 1973 and relocated to Southern California for a brief period, where they assisted Paul and Jan Crouch in launching Trinity Broadcasting Network before eventually starting their own television ministry in North Carolina. When WRET-TV dropped The 700 Club in 1973, the station's then-owner Ted Turner approached Bakker about buying two hours a day on the outlet, which Bakker accepted; this edition of the show was launched in a small studio at WRET-TV. (The 700 Club moved to then-ABC affiliate WCCB in Charlotte.) Bakker, looking to differentiate himself from the Crouches and their TBN program Praise the Lord, called his new show The PTL Club.

The PTL Club continued being produced at WRET and in November 1974, the show expanded to a few other stations such as WGGS-TV in Greenville, South Carolina; WHMB-TV in Indianapolis; WHCT in Hartford, Connecticut; and KHOF-TV in the Los Angeles area, among a few others. The show launched nationally in 1975, with two editions offered: one was the full two-hour edition, which tended to air on Christian stations and smaller independent stations, and the other was a one-hour edition which tended to air on stronger independent stations, as well as network affiliates.

By 1976, the Bakkers moved their studio to the site of a former furniture store in Charlotte. With The PTL Club program as its centerpiece, the Bakkers and their staff built what became known as the PTL Television Network, broadcasting worldwide. In a Tonight Show-type format, the program featured many well-known ministers and Christian recording artists. In the beginning, Henry "Uncle Henry" Harrison, who had worked with Bakker at CBN, was Bakker's co-host and sidekick (much like Ed McMahon to Johnny Carson), and when Tammy Faye took over as co-host, Harrison became the announcer.

The program was later broadcast from Bakker's Heritage Village ministry headquarters and complex on Park Road in Charlotte, and then moved to studios constructed at the ministry's new 2500-acre mixed-use family theme park and resort in Fort Mill, South Carolina, known as Heritage USA. Bakker's conspicuous consumption and prosperity gospel preaching led critics to claim that PTL stood for "Pass The Loot".

As time went on and as more stations had additional programming commitments by 1980, many opted to run only an hour of the PTL Club. In the fall of 1981, the show was cut to an hour, at which length it remained until its cancellation.

=== Scandal and subsequent demise ===
Due to his involvement in highly publicized financial and sexual scandals, Jim Bakker resigned on March 19, 1987. He turned all ministry assets over to Lynchburg, Virginia–based pastor and broadcaster Jerry Falwell, who became CEO of the parent organization, Heritage Village Church and Missionary Fellowship, Inc. and assumed control of Heritage USA, the cable network, and of its flagship program. Falwell's involvement was deemed newsworthy, as the PTL ministries were a part of the Assemblies of God denomination and Falwell was a Southern Baptist. Ministry supporters questioned Falwell's intentions and attributed his interest solely to maintaining control of the lucrative cable-television empire owned by PTL to broadcast his own ministry programming.

One commentator noted that "Bakker arranged for Falwell to take over PTL in March in an effort to avoid what he called a 'hostile takeover' of the television ministry by people threatening to expose a sexual encounter he admitted to having seven years earlier with church secretary Jessica Hahn." According to Hahn, on the afternoon of December 6, 1980, when she was a 21-year-old church secretary, Bakker and another preacher, John Wesley Fletcher drugged and raped her for "about 15 minutes". Hahn stated she overheard Bakker say afterward to another PTL staffer, "Did you get her too?"

A federal grand jury indicted Bakker for diverting millions of dollars of church funds to personal use. Much of the nation watched the court case to see the outcome of the $165 million in donations.

The PTL Club continued as a television program for a considerable time after this, first with Falwell as its host and PTL personality Doug Oldham as co-host. Falwell later brought in Christian singer Gary McSpadden as the show's co-host, along with PTL musical talent Ron Aldridge. The show was renamed PTL Today, then—in an effort to distance the show from the PTL name—Heritage Today. Aldridge continued as co-host alongside another PTL singer, Brenda Davis, after Falwell suddenly resigned from the now-bankrupt PTL ministry. McSpadden and Oldham subsequently left the show out of support for Falwell's decision to resign his position with the ministry.

With Falwell's resignation, Sam Johnson, a member of the PTL ministry team, assumed leadership and incorporated a new entity known as Heritage Ministries to run the television program and associated ministry functions. As Heritage USA and PTL assets were tied up in bankruptcy reorganization, the new ministry and the television program had to move from their longtime Heritage USA broadcast studios to newly bought property on Nations Ford Road in Charlotte that was named Heritage Place.

The program remained on the air as late as September 1988, when Johnson faced problems with the IRS.

In 1989, evangelist Morris Cerullo purchased the network out of bankruptcy.

On August 23, 1991, after the second and final day of his re-sentencing hearing, the court reduced Bakker's original 45-year sentence to 18 years, five of which he actually served before being released.

In February 2009, Atlanta, Georgia investment-banker Ben Dyer announced his intention to auction off over 15,000 hours of videotaped episodes of The PTL Club on March 27, 2009. A friend of Jim Bakker's purchased the programs. The master library of PTL programming was returned to Jim Bakker and the old tapes were digitally remastered and restored. Restored programs are being run on the new PTL Television Network on Roku and online at the PTL Television Network's website.
