= Vanguard University =

Private university in Costa Mesa, California, US

Coordinates: 33.6630°N 117.9000°W

Vanguard University of Southern California
- Other name: Vanguard University
- Former names: Southern California Bible School (1920–1939); Southern California Bible College (1939–1959); Southern California College (1959–1999)
- Motto: Truth. Virtue. Service
- Type: Private university
- Established: 1920; 106 years ago
- Religious affiliation: Assemblies of God
- President: Michael J. Beals
- Students: 2,246
- Undergraduates: 1,914
- Postgraduates: 332
- Location: Costa Mesa, California, United States
- Campus: Urban
- Colors: Navy Blue & Gold
- Nickname: Lions
- Sporting affiliations: NCAA Division II – Pacific West Conference
- Website: vanguard.edu
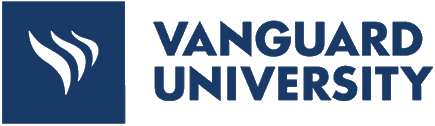

Vanguard University (officially Vanguard University of Southern California) is a private Protestant university in Costa Mesa, California. Vanguard's required core curriculum includes courses on American politics and history, theology, fine arts, and public speaking.

== History ==
In summer 1920, Harold K. Needham, D. W. Kerr, and W. C. Pierce opened Southern California Bible School, an institution intended to prepare Christian workers for the various ministries of the church. The school moved from Los Angeles to Pasadena in 1927. In 1939, it was chartered by the state of California to grant degrees, and changed its name to Southern California Bible College, the first four-year institution of the Assemblies of God. It moved to the present campus in 1950. Its name was changed to Southern California College nine years later when majors in the liberal arts were added to the curriculum.

Regional accreditation and membership in the Western Association of Schools and Colleges were granted in 1964. In 1967 the college received recognition and approval of its teaching credential program from the California State Board of Education. In June 1983 the Graduate Studies Program received approval from the Western Association of Schools and Colleges. A Degree Completion Program was started in 1994 for adult learners. On July 1, 1999, the school changed its name to Vanguard University of Southern California.

== Campus ==
Vanguard's campus is in Costa Mesa, California, about halfway between Los Angeles and San Diego. Two graduate programs, organizational psychology and clinical psychology, are housed nearby at a satellite campus in Santa Ana, California.

== Structure and accreditation ==
=== Structure ===
The President's Cabinet is responsible for oversight and management of the university. The university is divided into four schools: College of Arts and Sciences, Patty Arvielo School of Business and Communication, School of Education, and School of Theology and Ministry.

=== Accreditation ===
Vanguard is accredited by the WASC Senior College and University Commission.

== University presidents ==
Harold K. Needham served as the founding president of Vanguard University. Subsequently, nine people have served as presidents of the university: Daniel W. Kerr, Irvine J. Harrison, John B. Scott, O. Cope Budge, Emil A. Balliet, Wayne E. Kraiss, Murray W. Dempster, Carol Taylor, and Michael J. Beals, who assumed the office on August 1, 2013.

== Rankings ==
In U.S. News & World Report's 2026 Best Colleges report, the school was ranked #43 in the Regional Universities West category.

== Athletics ==
The Vanguard athletic teams are called the Lions. The university is a member of the National Collegiate Athletic Association (NCAA), primarily competing in the Pacific West Conference (PacWest) for most of its sports starting with the 2024–25 academic year. The university was formerly a member of the National Association of Intercollegiate Athletics (NAIA), primarily competing in the Golden State Athletic Conference (GSAC).

Vanguard competes in 20 intercollegiate varsity sports: Men's sports include baseball, basketball, cross country, golf, soccer, track & field, volleyball and wrestling; while women's sports include basketball, beach volleyball, cross country, dance, golf, soccer, softball, stunt, track & field, volleyball and wrestling.

=== Facilities ===
The Freed Center, opened in 2024, serves as the primary facility for the university's athletic programs. The center contains 1,200 seat gymnasium, along with weight and training rooms. Dean Harvey Field serves as the university's baseball field. The university also has a softball field and soccer complex.

== Notable alumni and faculty ==
- Daniel Amen, psychiatrist and author
- Heidi Baker, Christian missionary and author
- Ila Borders, professional female baseball player
- Stephanie Borowicz, Member of the Pennsylvania House of Representatives
- Ralph Carmichael, jazz and contemporary Christian musician and arranger
- Jim Dedrick, professional baseball player
- Cubbie Fink, musician
- Tim Fortugno, professional baseball player
- Jason Frenn, Missionary Evangelist, conference speaker, and author
- Troy Iwata, Daily Show correspondent, singer, actor
- Julius Kim, President of The Gospel Coalition and former professor of Westminster Seminary California
- Brent Kutzle, musician
- Larry Mantle, radio show host
- Harold D. McNaughton, land developer, pastor and initiated Vanguard Business Program
- José Rojas, professional baseball player
- Emily Rose, actress
