= Jessica Hahn =

American model and actor (born 1959)

- Born: July 7, 1959 (age 67); Massapequa, New York, U.S.
- Occupations: Actress, model
- Years active: 1987–1996
- Spouse: Frank Lloyd (m. 2008; div. 2023)
- Partner: Ron Leavitt (1991–2008; his death)
- Children: 2

Jessica Hahn (born July 7, 1959) is an American model and actress. She frequently appeared on The Howard Stern Show throughout the late 1980s and into the 2000s.

== Jim Bakker scandal ==
Hahn first came to public attention in 1987 after the disclosure that televangelist Jim Bakker had paid for her silence in response to an allegation against him of rape, which led to Bakker's announcement that he was stepping down as head of PTL Satellite Network and Heritage USA. According to Hahn, on the afternoon of December 6, 1980, when she was a 21-year-old church secretary, she was drugged and raped by Bakker and another preacher, John Wesley Fletcher. Hahn was given a $279,000 (equivalent to $790,663 in 2025) pay-off for her silence, which was paid with PTL's funds to Hahn through Bakker associate Roe Messner. Bakker, who made all of the financial decisions for the PTL organization, allegedly kept two sets of books to conceal the accounting irregularities. Reporters from The Charlotte Observer, led by Charles Shepard, investigated and published a series of articles regarding the PTL organization's finances. This precipitated Bakker's resignation and the publication of Hahn's claims. In his 1997 book, I Was Wrong, Bakker disputed Hahn's account, claiming that he was "set up" and that the sex was consensual.

== Acting and modeling career ==
After the public revelation of the Bakker scandal, Hahn appeared in several television shows, including Married... with Children. She was also known for her frequent appearances on The Howard Stern Show throughout the late 1980s and into the 2000s.

== Personal life ==
Hahn was born in Massapequa, New York, and graduated from Massapequa High School. She had a relationship with comedian Sam Kinison and appeared in his music video for "Wild Thing" in 1988. In 1991, she began a relationship with the co-creator of Married... with Children, Ron Leavitt, which continued until his death in 2008.

In December 2017, Hahn disclosed that she is married to Frank Lloyd (a film stuntman), is no longer active in show business, and lives on a ranch north of Los Angeles. In July 2023 People magazine reported that Hahn's husband Frank Lloyd had filed for divorce, citing irreconcilable differences and stating the couple had been separated since 2018.

== Filmography ==
- "Wild Thing" music video by Sam Kinison (1988)
- "Critical Mass" music video by Nuclear Assault (1989)
- Married... with Children as Ricki (1 episode, 1991)
- Bikini Summer II (1992) as Marilyn
- Dream On as Reporter 1 (1 episode, 1992)
- Blossom as Girl #1 (1 episode, 1992)
- "Runnin'" music video by Brittania, directed by Bryan Michael Stoller (1994)
- Amanda and the Alien (1995) (TV) as TV Host
- Unhappily Ever After as Miss Taylor (3 episodes, 1995)
- Hollywood: The Movie (1996) (V) as Esther
