= Blue Eye, Missouri =

- Town
- Location of Blue Eye, Missouri
- Coordinates: 36°30′03″N 93°23′16″W
- Country: United States
- State: Missouri
- County: Stone

Government
  - Mayor: Sondra Eby

Area
  - Total: 1.18 sq mi (3.05 km^{2})
  - Land: 1.18 sq mi (3.05 km^{2})
  - Water: 0 sq mi (0.00 km^{2})
- Elevation: 1,273 ft (388 m)

Population (2020)
  - Total: 289
  - Estimate (2024): 446
  - Density: 245.8/sq mi (94.89/km^{2})
- Time zone: UTC-6 (Central (CST))
  - Summer (DST): UTC-5 (CDT)
- ZIP code: 65611
- Area code: 417
- FIPS code: 29-06526
- GNIS feature ID: 2396595

Blue Eye is a town in Stone County, Missouri, United States. The population was 289 at the 2020 census. The population estimate is 446 as of 2024. Along with the rest of Stone County, it was part of the Branson Micropolitan Statistical Area until 2023, when the area was reduced to just Taney County. Blue Eye, Missouri is adjacent to Blue Eye, Arkansas.

== History ==
The first permanent settlement at Blue Eye was made in the 1860s. According to tradition, Blue Eye was so named from the noted blue eye color of an early postmaster.

== Geography ==
Blue Eye is located south of Table Rock Lake and just north of the Missouri-Arkansas border. The community is at the southern terminus of Missouri Route 13, as the road continues into Arkansas as Arkansas Route 21.

According to the United States Census Bureau, the village has a total area of 1.17 square miles (3.03 km^{2}), all land.

== Demographics ==
Historical population
Census	Pop.	Note	%±
1960	74		—
1970	91		23.0%
1980	94		3.3%
1990	112		19.1%
2000	129		15.2%
2010	167		29.5%
2020	289		73.1%
U.S. Decennial Census

=== 2010 census ===
As of the census of 2010, there were 167 people, 75 households, and 48 families living in the village. The population density was 142.7 inhabitants per square mile (55.1/km^{2}). There were 205 housing units at an average density of 175.2 per square mile (67.6/km^{2}). The racial makeup of the village was 97.0% White, 0.6% Native American, and 2.4% from two or more races. Hispanic or Latino of any race were 1.8% of the population.

There were 75 households, of which 20.0% had children under the age of 18 living with them, 50.7% were married couples living together, 10.7% had a female householder with no husband present, 2.7% had a male householder with no wife present, and 36.0% were non-families. 32.0% of all households were made up of individuals, and 12% had someone living alone who was 65 years of age or older. The average household size was 2.23 and the average family size was 2.77.

The median age in the village was 44.3 years. 19.8% of residents were under the age of 18; 9% were between the ages of 18 and 24; 22.2% were from 25 to 44; 27.6% were from 45 to 64; and 21.6% were 65 years of age or older. The gender makeup of the village was 46.7% male and 53.3% female.

=== 2000 census ===
As of the census of 2000, there were 129 people, 49 households, and 38 families living in the town. The population density was 240.5 inhabitants per square mile (92.9/km^{2}). There were 57 housing units at an average density of 106.3 per square mile (41.0/km^{2}). The racial makeup of the town was 99.22% White, and 0.78% Native American.

There were 49 households, out of which 36.7% had children under the age of 18 living with them, 63.3% were married couples living together, 12.2% had a female householder with no husband present, and 22.4% were non-families. 18.4% of all households were made up of individuals, and 10.2% had someone living alone who was 65 years of age or older. The average household size was 2.63 and the average family size was 3.03.

In the town the population was spread out, with 27.1% under the age of 18, 5.4% from 18 to 24, 31.0% from 25 to 44, 24.8% from 45 to 64, and 11.6% who were 65 years of age or older. The median age was 37 years. For every 100 females there were 67.5 males. For every 100 females age 18 and over, there were 91.8 males.

The median income for a household in the town was $35,313, and the median income for a family was $36,875. Males had a median income of $23,438 versus $16,250 for females. The per capita income for the town was $14,183. There were 15.6% of families and 23.9% of the population living below the poverty line, including 50.0% of under 18 and none of those over 64.

== Education ==
Blue Eye R-V School District operates one elementary school, one middle school and Blue Eye High School.

Blue Eye has a public library, a branch of the Stone County Library.

== Notable people ==
Jim Bakker, pastor and televangelist.
