= John Wesley Fletcher =

American pastor (1940–1996)

- Born: January 24, 1940; Durham, North Carolina, U.S.
- Died: June 21, 1996 (aged 56); Hillsborough, North Carolina, U.S.
- Resting place: Maplewood Cemetery
- Occupation: Pastor
- Spouse: Shirley Connour (m. 1971; div. 1989)
- Children: 1

John Wesley Fletcher (January 24, 1940 – June 21, 1996) was an American defrocked Assemblies of God pastor, known for his role in the PTL scandal involving Tammy Faye and Jim Bakker.

== Early life ==
Fletcher was born in Durham, North Carolina, in 1940. He dropped out of high school and worked a number of jobs, including driving an ambulance, working as a party clown, and he claimed to have run a topless bar. He left Durham in 1970, after being convicted for writing bad checks five times and facing lawsuits for unpaid debts.

In May 1971, Fletcher married Shirley Connour, a singer and musician who performed with a traveling evangelist. They had a son, John Wesley Jr, in September 1973.

== Career ==
During the 1970s, Fletcher became an Assemblies of God pastor with an evangelical foundation located in Oklahoma City and started making regular appearances on the PTL Club television program towards the end of the decade.

== Downfall and later years ==
In 1980, PTL Club host Jim Bakker became estranged from his wife, Tammy Faye Bakker, and he asked Fletcher to "bring [him] a woman". Fletcher arranged for church secretary Jessica Hahn to meet Bakker. Hahn later claimed that Fletcher and Bakker subsequently raped her but both claimed to have had a consensual sexual encounter with her. The following year, the Assemblies of God defrocked him after allegations of homosexuality were made against him. Other sources state he was defrocked twice for alcoholism. Commenting on press reports regarding his dismissal from the Assemblies of God, Fletcher stated that "some of the stuff in the media is not exactly accurate, (but) I'm not going to refute it."

Despite being defrocked, Fletcher continued preaching and had planned to open a church center in Columbus, Georgia. However, in early 1987, the Jessica Hahn scandal was made public, and Fletcher came to national attention. Fletcher subsequently told Penthouse that he had had sex with Bakker three times, and he repeated the claim before a grand jury. Bakker denied these claims under oath. Fletcher gave conflicting statements to the grand jury about whether sex was the only reason that he arranged for Hahn to meet Bakker and was charged with perjury. He pleaded guilty and Judge Robert Daniel Potter sentenced him to three years' probation in May 1990.

During the scandal, Fletcher attempted suicide twice and his wife of 18 years divorced him.

He filed for bankruptcy and his ministry collapsed. In 1989, Fletcher was arrested twice for public intoxication and he had his driver's license revoked after being arrested for driving under the influence. Fletcher stated that he "lost all that's dear and precious to me because I was loyal to [Bakker]." At the time of his sentencing, he had been working as a roofer.

Fletcher's role in the PTL scandal is depicted in the 2021 film The Eyes of Tammy Faye, with Louis Cancelmi as Richard Fletcher.

== Death ==
On June 21, 1996, Fletcher died at the age of 56 in Hillsborough, North Carolina. His death was reportedly from AIDS. Fletcher is buried in Maplewood Cemetery in Durham, North Carolina.
