= Heritage International Ministries =

Hotel and convention center in Fort Mill, South Carolina

Coordinates: 35.0602°N 80.9125°W

- Type: Private
- Industry: Church; hotel; K-12 school; conference center
- Predecessor: Heritage USA
- Founded: 2004; 22 years ago
- Headquarters: 375 Star Light Drive, Fort Mill, South Carolina 29715
- Key people: Rick Joyner
- Parent: MorningStar Fellowship Church, Inc.
- Website: http://www.heritageconferencecenter.org/

Heritage International Ministries (H.I.M.) is an Evangelical Christian hotel and convention center in Fort Mill, South Carolina.

== History ==
MorningStar Ministries was founded by Rick Joyner and wife Julie in 1985. In 2004, MorningStar Fellowship Church purchased a portion of the former Heritage USA, including the 501-room Heritage Grand Hotel and Conference Center, the adjacent unfinished 21-story Heritage Grand Towers, the area of the "King's Castle" (originally to have been a Wendy's restaurant), and 52 acres (210,000 m^{2}) of adjoining property.

MorningStar holds church services in the hotel atrium and has restored practically all of the 501 hotel rooms. The hotel is still used as a hotel with some rooms having been converted to privately owned condominiums. It also features a Christian retreat center and one of the state’s largest conference centers. The adjacent Main Street USA shops have been reopened and are used as retail shops and classrooms with the hotel rooms above converted into apartments/dormitories.

In 2007, announced plans for the uncompleted high-rise tower, to be renamed "Heritage Tower", included an assisted-living facility/retirement complex. The King's Castle was demolished in 2013, due to it "being too expensive to do anything with".

In 2018, MorningStar Ministries filed a federal lawsuit accusing York County of religious discrimination for blocking attempts to renovate the tower. In a separate lawsuit, York County contended the property is a nuisance and didn’t meet financing requirements. In that case, the South Carolina Supreme Court ruled in favor of the county.

In June 2021, MorningStar Ministries held a groundbreaking and dedication ceremony to celebrate the starting of renovations to the 21-story tower, claiming the development will be a "close-knit residential community for active adult Christians." Local journalists attempted to get the permits and building plans from York County, but no permits or plans had been applied for nor submitted.

In June 2026, MorningStar announced it would tear down the tower and build a senior living complex next to its site.
