= Roger Nelson (skydiver) =

American skydiver (1955–2003)

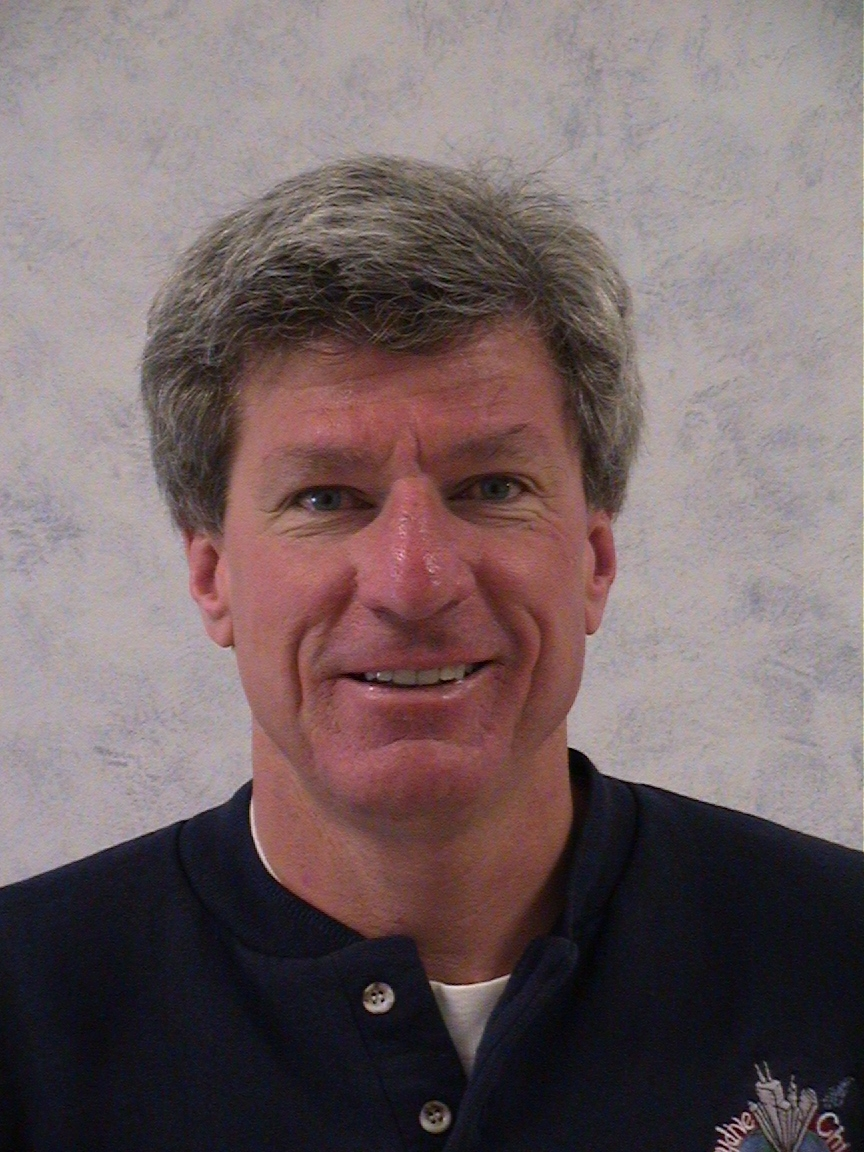
Roger Nelson

Roger Warren Nelson (October 25, 1955 – June 7, 2003) was a skydiver, convicted drug smuggler, and founder of Skydive Chicago, one of the largest skydiving centers in the United States.

== Freak Brothers ==
Nelson and his older brother, Carl Nelson, grew up in Lisle, Illinois, a suburb of Chicago. They began their skydiving careers in 1971 as novice parachutists at a drop-zone surrounded by cornfields in Hinckley, Illinois. At the time, relative work (RW) or formation skydiving was in its infancy. Carl and Roger Nelson, unlike most skydivers at the time, were not ex-military and had the '70s hippie look, with long hair and grubby clothes. They became known as the "Freak Brothers". The name stuck. A form of flying that they later popularized (anything that was not belly to earth) became known as freak-flying, eventually morphing into freeflying.

The Freak Brothers became an inclusive organization for skydivers, with thousands of Freak Brothers worldwide. Nelson, his wife Jeannie and Carl organized the first large skydiving boogies in the form of the annual Freak Brothers Convention, which was later superseded by the World FreeFall Convention.

Carl, an accomplished skydiver with over 1,000 jumps, died in a skydiving accident in 1979.

== Later life ==
Nelson went on to become a U.S. National Skydiving Champion and served as a director of the U.S. Parachute Association. He set four world records and earned a gold medal in national competition. With over 6,000 jumps and 100 hours of freefall, Nelson was involved in television, lectures and authored numerous books and articles on the sport. He earned his wings as a commercial pilot with over 10,000 flight hours.

In 1987, Nelson pleaded guilty to tax evasion and was sentenced to ten years in federal prison for unreported income related to his international drug smuggling operation. He served five years with time off for good behavior. Nelson, Federal Bureau of Prisons (BOP) Register # 95870–024, was released from BOP custody on December 18, 1992.

Nelson organized numerous attempts to break the world record for "largest skydiving formation".

- 1986 set the FAI world record at 120
- 1988 set the FAI world record at 144
- 1994 attempted to break the record
- 1995 attempted to break the record
- 1998 set the FAI world record at 246 (and the Guinness Book record at 259)
- 2000 attempted to break the record

== Death ==
In 2003, Nelson died in a skydiving accident. While he was landing he collided with another jumper, causing his parachute to collapse. Nelson then fell about 50 feet and received fatal injuries.
