= Jim Bakker =

American televangelist (1940–2026)

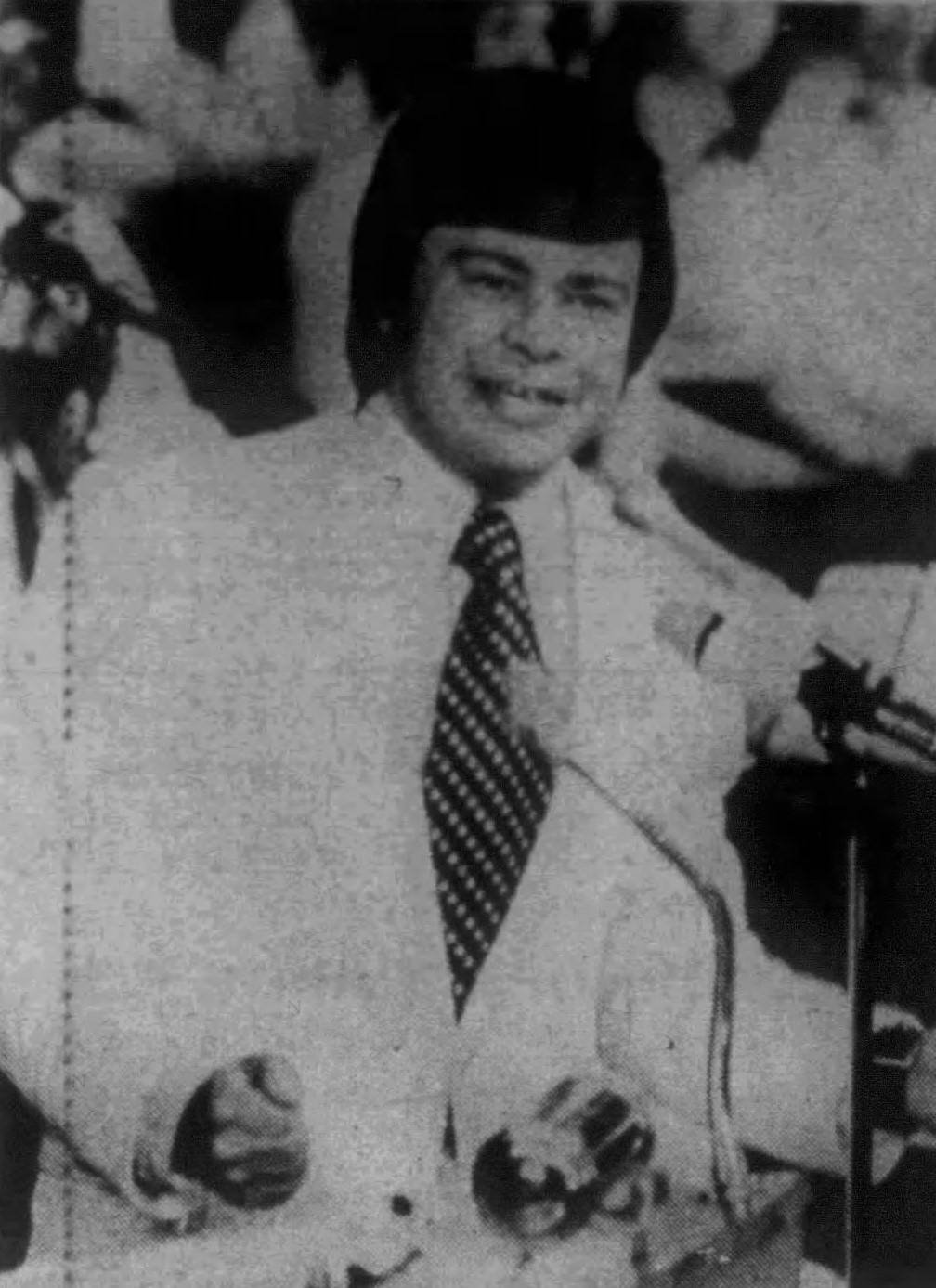
- Bakker in 1975
- Born: James Orsen Bakker; January 2, 1940; Muskegon, Michigan, U.S.
- Died: October 5, 2026 (aged 86); Branson, Missouri, U.S.
- Occupation: Televangelist
- Spouses: Tammy Faye LaValley (m. 1961; div. 1992) Lori Beth Graham (m. 1998)
- Children: 7, including Jay Bakker

Ecclesiastical career
- Church: Assemblies of God (1960–1988); Charismatic (2003–2026)
- Congregations: The PTL Club; Heritage USA; Heritage Village Church; Morningside Church

James Orsen Bakker (/ˈbeɪkər/; January 2, 1940 – October 5, 2026) was an American televangelist and convicted felon. Between 1974 and 1987, Bakker hosted the television program The PTL Club and its cable television platform, the PTL Satellite Network, with his then-wife, Tammy Faye. He also developed Heritage USA, a now-defunct Christian theme park in Fort Mill, South Carolina. After serving a prison sentence related to defrauding his parishioners, Bakker returned to televangelism in 2003, hosting The Jim Bakker Show until his 2026 death.

Bakker was born in Muskegon, Michigan, and attended North Central University in Minneapolis, where he met Tammy Faye LaValley. The two married in 1961, left college, and became itinerant evangelists, eventually having two children. Early in his career, Bakker worked at Pat Robertson's Christian Broadcasting Network, helping to grow the network and hosting shows including The 700 Club and a children’s program. He and Tammy Faye later co-founded the Trinity Broadcasting Network with Paul and Jan Crouch, but left after a short partnership due to disagreements, eventually establishing the PTL ministry and the PTL Satellite Network. In the late 1980s, Bakker resigned from the PTL ministry over a cover-up of hush money to church secretary Jessica Hahn for an alleged rape. Subsequent revelations of accounting fraud brought about felony charges, conviction, and imprisonment.

After being divorced by Tammy Faye in 1992, Bakker was released from prison two years later and married Lori Beth Graham in 1998. Alongside Lori, Bakker returned to televangelism in 2003, founding Morningside Church in Blue Eye, Missouri, and reestablished the PTL ministry. Bakker's The Jim Bakker Show focused on apocalyptic themes and survivalist products, while distancing himself from his earlier prosperity gospel teachings. His later years included controversial claims, such as predicting major events and promoting unproven supplements, which drew legal action and criticism during the COVID-19 pandemic. Bakker wrote several books, including I Was Wrong and Time Has Come: How to Prepare Now for Epic Events Ahead.

== Early life and education ==
James Orsen Bakker was born in Muskegon, Michigan, the son of Raleigh Bakker and Furnia Lynette "Furn" Irwin. Bakker attended North Central Bible College in Minneapolis, affiliated with the Assemblies of God, where he met fellow student Tammy Faye LaValley in 1960. Bakker worked at a restaurant in the Young-Quinlan department store in Minneapolis; LaValley worked at the Three Sisters, a nearby boutique. Despite already having a fiancée in Muskegon, Bakker began courting LaValley.

Bakker married LaValley on April 1, 1961, and they left college to become itinerant evangelists. They had two children, Tammy Sue "Sissy" Bakker Chapman (born March 2, 1970) and Jamie Charles "Jay" Bakker (born December 18, 1975). The couple divorced on March 13, 1992. On September 4, 1998, Bakker married Lori Beth Graham, a former televangelist, fifty days after they met. In 2002, they adopted five children, siblings whom Graham had befriended in Phoenix.

== Career ==
=== Early career ===
In 1966, Jim and Tammy Faye Bakker began working at Pat Robertson's Christian Broadcasting Network (CBN) in Portsmouth, Virginia, which had an audience in the low thousands at the time. The Bakkers contributed to the network's growth, hosting a children's variety show called Come On Over that employed comic routines with puppets. Due to the success of Come On Over, Robertson made Bakker the host of a new prime-time talk show, The 700 Club, which gradually became CBN's flagship program. The Bakkers left CBN in 1973 and, soon after, joined with Paul and Jan Crouch to help co-found the Trinity Broadcasting Network (TBN) in California. However, this partnership lasted only eight months until a falling-out between Jim Bakker and Paul Crouch caused the Bakkers to eventually leave the new network.

=== PTL ===
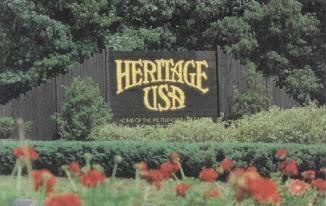
Heritage USA sign in 2007. The site is now mostly demolished.

While under TBN, the Bakkers moved to Charlotte, North Carolina, where in May 1973 they launched an east coast version of Praise The Lord under TBN's umbrella. Less than a year later the Bakkers formed their own non profit organization, registered the PTL trademark, left the umbrella of TBN and the Crouches, and continued their show on 36 WRET Charlotte, 16 WGGS Greenville, South Carolina, and a few other stations. In 1975, they nationally debuted their own late night-style talk show, known as The PTL Club. Bakker founded the PTL Satellite Network in 1974, which aired The PTL Club and other religious television programs through local affiliates across the U.S.

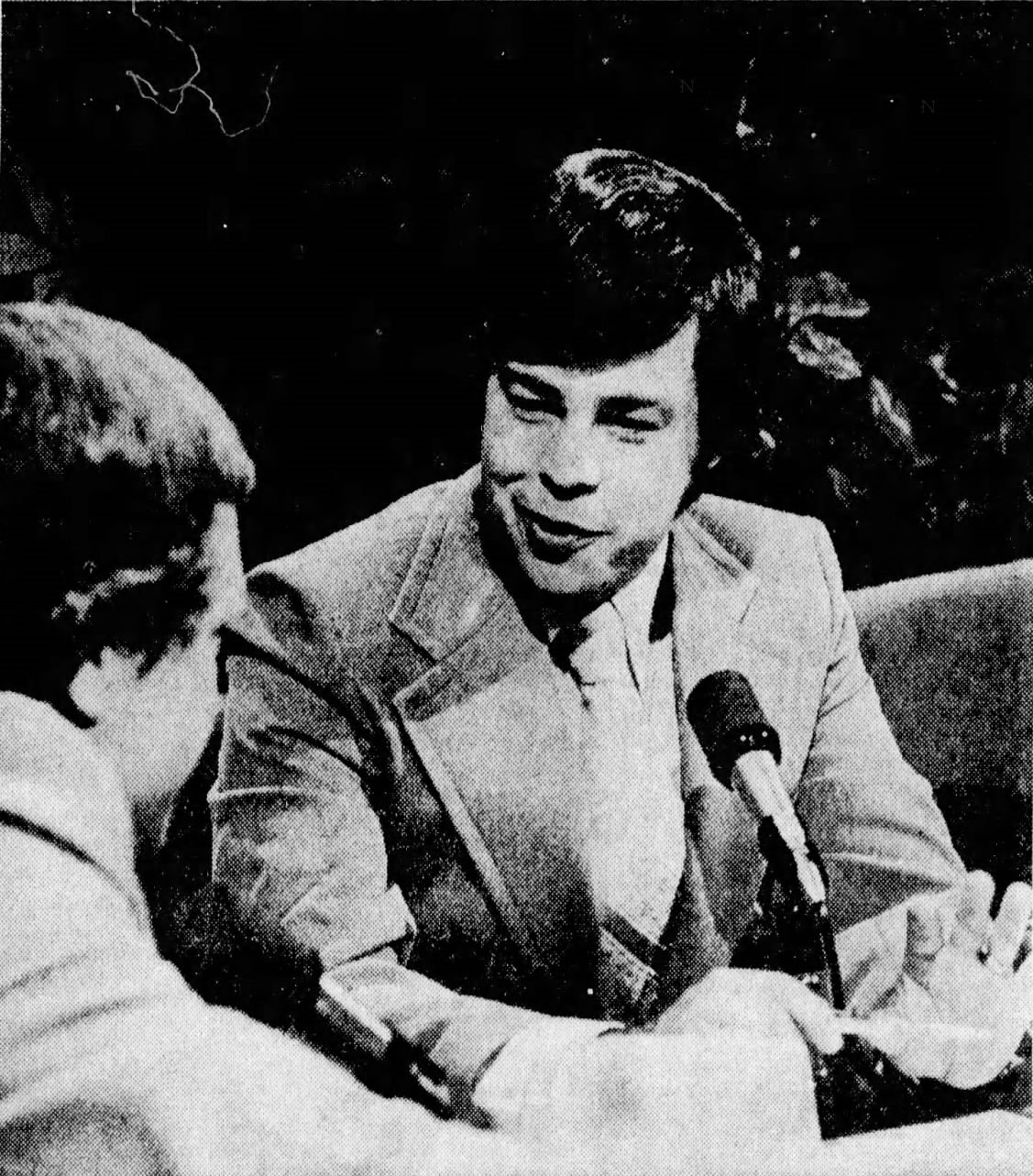
Bakker on The PTL Club, in 1975

Throughout the 1970s, Bakker built a headquarters for PTL in the Carolinas called Heritage Village. Over time, the Bakkers expanded the ministry to include the Heritage USA theme park in Fort Mill, South Carolina, which became the third most successful theme park in the U.S. at the time. Viewer contributions were estimated to exceed $1 million a week, with proceeds to expand the theme park and The PTL Club's mission. Bakker responded to inquiries about his use of mass media by saying: "I believe that if Jesus were alive today, he would be on TV".

Two scandals brought down PTL in 1987: Bakker was accused of sexual misconduct by church secretary Jessica Hahn, which led to his resignation, and his illegal misuse of ministry funds eventually led to his imprisonment. Bakker was dismissed as an Assemblies of God minister on May 6, 1987. In 1990, the biographic television movie Fall from Grace, starring Kevin Spacey as Bakker, depicted his rise and fall. On January 18, 2019, ABC's 20/20 aired a two-hour special, entitled Unfaithfully Yours, about the PTL scandal.

==== Early investigations ====
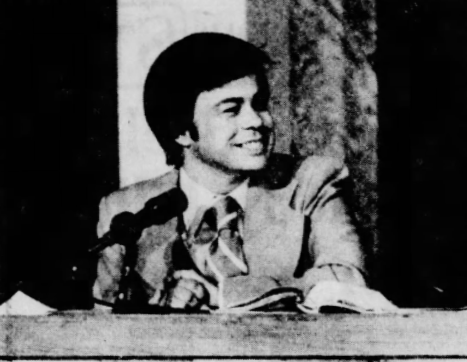
Bakker in 1977

In 1979, Bakker and PTL came under investigation by the Federal Communications Commission (FCC) for allegedly misusing funds raised on the air. The FCC report was finalized in 1982 and found that Bakker had raised $350,000 that he told viewers would go towards funding overseas missions but that was actually used to pay for part of Heritage USA. The report also found that the Bakkers used PTL funds for personal expenses. FCC commissioners voted four to three to drop the investigation, after which they allowed Bakker to sell the only TV station that he owned, therefore bypassing future FCC oversight. The FCC forwarded its report to the U.S. Department of Justice, which declined to press charges, citing insufficient evidence. Bakker used the controversy to raise more funds from his audience, branding the investigation a "witch-hunt" and asking viewers to "give the Devil a black eye".

A confidential 1985 Internal Revenue Service (IRS) report found that $1.3 million in ministry funds was used for the Bakkers' personal benefit from 1980 to 1983. The report recommended that PTL be stripped of its tax-exempt status, but no action was taken until after the Jessica Hahn scandal broke in 1987. Art Harris and Michael Isikoff wrote in The Washington Post that politics may have played a role in the three government agencies taking no action against PTL despite the evidence against them, as members of the Reagan administration were not eager to go after television ministers whose evangelical followers made up their base.

==== Sexual misconduct and resignation ====
A $279,000 payoff for the silence of Hahn, who alleged that Bakker and former PTL Club co-host John Wesley Fletcher drugged and raped her, was paid with PTL funds through Bakker's associate Roe Messner. Bakker, who made PTL's financial decisions, allegedly kept two sets of books to conceal accounting irregularities. Reporters for The Charlotte Observer, led by Charles Shepard, investigated PTL's finances and published a series of articles.

On March 19, 1987, after the disclosure of a payoff to Hahn, Bakker resigned from PTL. Although he acknowledged that he had a sexual encounter with Hahn at a hotel room in Clearwater, Florida, he denied raping her. Bakker was also the subject of homosexual and bisexual allegations made by Fletcher and PTL director Jay Babcock, which Bakker denied under oath. Rival televangelist John Ankerberg appeared on Larry King Live and made several allegations of moral impropriety against Bakker, which both Bakkers denied.

Bakker was succeeded as PTL head by the Rev. Jerry Falwell of Thomas Road Baptist Church in Lynchburg, Virginia. Bakker chose Falwell as his successor because he feared that fellow televangelist Jimmy Swaggart, who had initiated an Assemblies of God investigation into Bakker's sexual misconduct, was attempting to take over his ministry.

Bakker believed that Falwell would temporarily lead the ministry until the scandal died down, but on April 28, 1987, Falwell barred Bakker from returning to PTL. Later that summer, as donations declined sharply in the wake of Bakker's resignation and the end of The PTL Club, Falwell raised $20 million to keep Heritage USA solvent and took a promised water slide ride at the park. Falwell and the remaining members of the PTL board resigned in October 1987, stating that a ruling from a bankruptcy court judge made rebuilding the ministry impossible.

In response to the scandal, Falwell called Bakker a liar, an embezzler, a sexual deviant, and "the greatest scab and cancer on the face of Christianity in 2,000 years of church history". On CNN, Swaggart stated that Bakker was a "cancer in the body of Christ". In February 1988, Swaggart became involved in a sex scandal of his own after being caught visiting prostitutes in New Orleans. The Bakker and Swaggart scandals had a profound effect on the world of televangelism, causing greater media scrutiny of TV ministers and their finances. Falwell said that the scandals had "strengthened broadcast evangelism and made Christianity stronger, more mature and more committed."

==== Fraud conviction and imprisonment ====
The PTL Club's fundraising activities between 1984 and 1987 were reported by The Charlotte Observer, eventually leading to criminal charges against Bakker. Bakker and his PTL associates sold $1,000 "lifetime memberships", entitling buyers to an annual three-night stay at a luxury hotel at Heritage USA. According to the prosecution at Bakker's fraud trial, tens of thousands of memberships were sold but only one 500-room hotel was ever finished. Bakker sold "exclusive partnerships" which exceeded capacity, raising more than twice the money needed to build the hotel. Much of the money paid Heritage USA's operating expenses, and Bakker kept $3.4 million.

After a 16-month federal grand jury probe, Bakker was indicted in 1988 on eight counts of mail fraud, 15 counts of wire fraud and one count of conspiracy. In 1989, after a five-week trial which began on August 28 in Charlotte, North Carolina, a jury found him guilty on all 24 counts. Judge Robert Daniel Potter sentenced Bakker to 45 years in federal prison and imposed a $500,000 fine. At the Federal Medical Center, Rochester in Rochester, Minnesota, he shared a cell with activist Lyndon LaRouche and skydiver Roger Nelson.

The United States Court of Appeals for the Fourth Circuit upheld Bakker's conviction on the fraud and conspiracy charges, voided Bakker's 45-year sentence and $500,000 fine and ordered a new sentencing hearing in February 1991. The court ruled that Potter's sentencing statement about Bakker, that "those of us who do have a religion are sick of being saps for money-grubbing preachers and priests", was evidence that the judge had injected his religious beliefs into Bakker's sentence.

Bakker's sentence was reduced to eight years at a hearing on November 16, 1992. In August 1993, he was transferred to a minimum-security federal prison in Jesup, Georgia. Bakker was paroled in July 1994, after serving almost five years of his sentence. His son Jay spearheaded a letter-writing campaign to the parole board advocating leniency. Celebrity lawyer Alan Dershowitz acted as Bakker's parole attorney, having said that he "would guarantee that Mr. Bakker would never again engage in the blend of religion and commerce that led to his conviction." Bakker was released from Federal Bureau of Prisons custody on December 1, 1994, owing $6 million to the IRS.

=== Return to televangelism ===
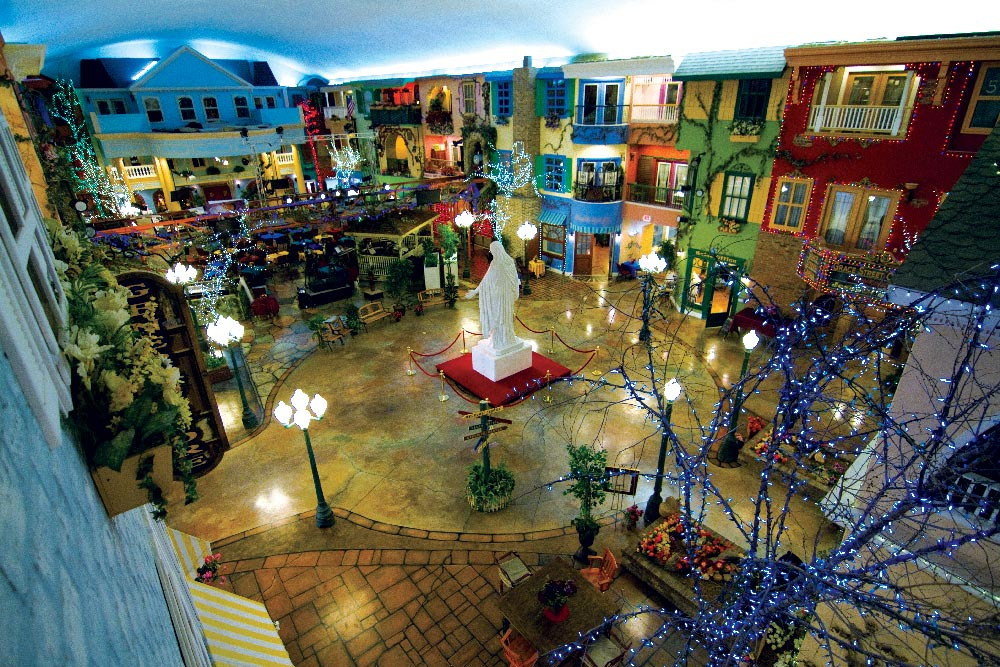
The set of The Jim Bakker Show in Blue Eye, Missouri

In 2003, Bakker began broadcasting The Jim Bakker Show daily at Studio City Café in Branson, Missouri, with his second wife Lori; it was carried on CTN, Daystar, Folk TV, Grace Network (Canada), Daystar Television Canada, GEB America, Hope TV (Canada), Impact Network, WGN, WHT, TCT Network, The Word Network, UpliftTV, and ZLiving networks. Most of Bakker's audience received his program on DirecTV and Dish Network.

Bakker condemned the prosperity theology in which he took part earlier in his career, and embraced apocalypticism. His show had a millennial, survivalist focus and sold buckets of freeze-dried food, such as beans on toast, to his audience in preparation for the end of days. Elspeth Reeve wrote in The Atlantic that Bakker's "doomsday survival gear" was overpriced. A man named Jerry Crawford, who credits Bakker with saving his marriage, invested $25 million in a new ministry for Bakker in Blue Eye, Missouri, named Morningside USA. Production for The Jim Bakker Show moved to Morningside in 2008.

==== Prophecies and statements ====
In 2013, Bakker wrote Time Has Come: How to Prepare Now for Epic Events Ahead about end-time events. Bakker changed his views on prosperity theology. In his 1980 book Eight Keys to Success, he stated, "God wants you to be happy, God wants you to be rich, God wants you to prosper." In his 1996 book, I Was Wrong, he admitted that the first time he actually read the Bible all the way through was in prison. Bakker also wrote that he realized that he had taken passages out of context and used them as prooftexts to support his prosperity theology.

Bakker's revived show features a number of ministers who bill themselves as "prophets". He now says that "PTL" stands for "Prophets Talking Loud".

In an October 2017 video, Bakker said that "God will punish those" who ridicule him; he said that Hurricane Harvey was a judgment of God, and he blamed Hurricane Matthew on then-President Barack Obama. Bakker predicted that if then-President Donald Trump was impeached, Christians would begin a second American civil war. He compared the 2017 Washington train derailment to the sinking of the RMS Titanic and stated the Amtrak train derailment was a warning from God. He also claimed that he predicted the September 11 attacks of 2001, stating that he "saw 9/11 in 1999 before New Year's Eve" and that there would "be terrorism" and bombings in New York City and Washington, D.C. A few days after the Stoneman Douglas High School shooting, he stated that "God came to [him] in a dream... and he was wearing camouflage, a hunting vest and had an AR-15 strapped to his back" and that God supported Trump's plan to arm teachers. Following the death of Billy Graham on February 21, 2018, Bakker attended Graham's funeral and paid his respects, stating that Graham was the greatest preacher since Jesus, and also remarking that Graham had visited him in prison.

On the Stand in the Gap Today radio program, Pennsylvania Pastors Network president Sam Rohrer criticized Bakker's civil-war prediction. Christian Today criticized Bakker's show for preying on "the most vulnerable kinds of people" and claimed that it had "no place on our TV screens."

==== COVID-19 misinformation ====
Bakker sold colloidal silver supplements that he advertised as a panacea. In March 2020, the office of the Attorney General of New York ordered Bakker to cease making false medicinal claims about his supplements' alleged ability to cure the 2019–2020 strains of coronavirus, and the Federal Trade Commission and the Food and Drug Administration also sent a warning letter to Bakker about his claims regarding the supplements and coronavirus.

Missouri attorney general Eric Schmitt and Arkansas attorney general Leslie Rutledge filed lawsuits against Bakker for allegedly pushing the supplements as a treatment for the virus. In the state lawsuit against him, Bakker was represented by former Missouri governor Jay Nixon, who argued for the suit to be dismissed. Nixon said that the allegations made in the lawsuit are false, stating: "Bakker is being unfairly targeted by those who want to crush his ministry and force his Christian television program off the air."

In April 2020, prohibited from receiving credit card transactions, Bakker disclosed to his viewers that his ministry was on the brink of filing for bankruptcy and urgently petitioned them for donations.

The following month, GEB America and World Harvest Television dropped Bakker's program from their networks after DirecTV owner AT&T asked channels to reconsider airing the show. AT&T made the request of its channels in response to a deplatforming campaign from the liberal Christian group Faithful America.

On June 23, 2021, Schmitt announced the settlement of the state's lawsuit against Bakker. Bakker and Morningside Church would be prohibited from saying silver solution could "diagnose, prevent, mitigate, treat, or cure any disease or illness". Restitution of about $157,000 would also be paid to those who bought silver solution between February 12, 2020, and March 10, 2020.

== Later life ==
Bakker had a minor stroke in 2020 and took a sabbatical from his program to recover. Lori Bakker blamed the stroke on his hard work on his show and wrote that he had described the criticism against him as "the most vicious attack that he has ever experienced". Bakker returned to his program for the first time following his stroke on July 8, 2020.

== Death ==
Bakker died in Branson, Missouri, on October 5, 2026, at the age of 86.

== Relationships with his children ==
Bakker's son, Jay, became a progressive Christian pastor and advocate for LGBT inclusion. After rejecting the Christian fundamentalist beliefs he had grown up with, Jay co-founded Revolution Church in 1994 to minister to people who felt rejected by traditional Christianity. His religious beliefs and socially liberal views differed from his father's, but the two remained in contact, according to a 2013 report. In February 2026, Jay said that he and his father differed on theology and politics but tried to maintain a relationship. Following his father's death in October 2026, he described their relationship as complicated and requested privacy to mourn.

Jay did not attend his father's funeral on October 12, 2026, but contributed a video message to the service. He had visited his father several weeks before his death and said they had been able to speak and say goodbye in person. Jay also criticized those who celebrated his father's death, saying such comments were hurtful to surviving family members, particularly those whose relationships with him had been complicated.

Bakker's daughter, Tammy Sue, said she had left his ministry in 2022 because she disagreed with its message and had subsequently become estranged from him. She said she was not informed that her father was ill or receiving hospice care until three hours before his death, and learned that he had died from a friend who had seen the news online.

In a public statement following his death, Tammy Sue apologized to people harmed by her family's ministry. She acknowledged that some followers had donated their last money to the ministry and expressed concern about people who had experienced rejection, depression or suicidal thoughts because of their treatment by churches. She said her father's death had prompted her to speak out and encouraged people to support their local LGBTQ communities rather than send flowers or gifts in his memory.

== Bibliography ==
- Move That Mountain (1976), ISBN 978-0-88270-164-6
- Eight Keys to Success (1980), ISBN 978-0-89221-071-8
- I Was Wrong (1996), ISBN 978-0-7852-7425-4
- Prosperity and the Coming Apocalypse (1998), ISBN 978-1-4185-5422-4
- The Refuge: The Joy of Christian Community in a Torn-Apart World (2000), ISBN 978-1-4185-5423-1
- Time Has Come: How to Prepare Now for Epic Events Ahead (2014), ISBN 978-1-61795-134-3
- You Can Make It: God's Faithfulness in Dark Times-Past, Present and Future (2021), ISBN 978-1-63641-047-0
