= Jack Deere =

American charismatic pastor and theologian

Jack Deere is an American charismatic pastor and theologian. He was an associate professor of Old Testament at Dallas Seminary.

In the late 1980s, he abandoned his earlier theological position, announcing that he had experienced the charismatic gifts for himself through the ministry of John Wimber.

From 1988 to 1992 he pastored a Vineyard church, and pastored a Presbyterian church in Montana from 1994 to 1996. He remained in Montana for several years while traveling and speaking, and then moved back to the Dallas-Fort Worth Metroplex where he was pastor of Wellspring Church in North Richland Hills, a church now pastored by Dustin Aguilar.

== Biography ==
Deere was reared in Ft. Worth, Texas, the oldest of four children. When Jack was twelve years old, his father unexpectedly took his own life. The sorrow and great impact of this loss (which included great financial strain on the family) impelled him at first to rebel for a time, but then at age 17 to develop Christian religious beliefs. This eventually led to his decision to attend Texas Christian University in Fort Worth, where he majored in Philosophy. While there, he started working with the ministry of Young Life.

After graduation from TCU in 1971, he attended Dallas Theological Seminary, concentrating in Greek and Hebrew study of the Bible and earning both a Master and a Doctor of Theology degree. In 1976, he was invited to join the DTS faculty, teaching Hebrew and Old Testament. During his tenure at Dallas Seminary, he started and pastored two churches.

In 1986, after a thorough re-examination of the scriptures, Deere reversed his position on the supernatural gifts of the Holy Spirit (such as healing and prophecy), arguing that all the gifts of the Spirit are for today, and did not cease with the formation of the New Testament canon. Later on, this experience became the basis of his two companion books, Surprised by the Power of the Spirit and Surprised by the Voice of God.

At the end of 1987, Deere left the Dallas Seminary faculty and joined the staff of the Vineyard Christian Fellowship Church in Anaheim, California, pastored at that time by his friend, Vineyard movement founder John Wimber.

In 1992, Deere left the Anaheim Vineyard for Montana, where he began a ministry as a writer and conference-speaker.

In the spring of 2004, Deere began Wellspring Church in North Richland Hills, Texas, a church he pastored for many years. He relinquished all leadership positions to be able to devote himself to full-time care of his wife, and they moved from Colleyville, Texas to Tennessee.

The Deeres have two grown children, Stephen and Alese.

== Publications ==
=== Books ===
- Deere, Jack, Surprised by the Power of the Spirit (Zondervan, 1993)
- Deere, Jack, Surprised by the Voice of God (Zondervan, 1996)
- Deere, Jack, The Beginner's Guide to the Gift of Prophecy (Regal, 2008)
- Deere, Jack, Even in Our Darkness: A Story of Beauty in a Broken Life (Zondervan, March 6, 2018)

Sermon given January 13, 2012 at the 12th Annual Winter conference of the Anglican Missions in the Americas (AMIA) Morning Worship, Houston TX: "The Three Distinct Phases of My Life With God." http://www.virtueonline.org/houston-tx-three-distinct-phases-my-life-god
