= Two sets of books =

Keeping multiple accounting records for different uses

The concept of "two sets of books" refers to the practice of keeping two sets of accounting ledgers ("books"). In colloquial terms, this practice may refer to fraudulent behavior, i.e. attempting to hide or disguise financial transactions from outsiders by having a falsified set of records for official use and another for internal recordkeeping. It may be done for legitimate reasons as well.

== Fraud ==
Having two sets of books enables a company to use one set for tax authorities and another for investors. The goal is to maximize income for financial statements in one set while showing lower income on the other set in order to avoid paying higher taxes.

== Legal practice ==
Keeping "two sets of books" does not always refer to an illegal practice. Publicly-traded companies might maintain two sets of accounting records while still abiding by the Financial Accounting Standards Board (FASB) rules for preparing financial statements and the Internal Revenue Code when preparing tax returns.

== See also ==
- Tax evasion
- Accounting ethics
- Creative accounting
