= Heritage USA =

Biblical theme park (1978–1989)

Coordinates: 35°3′38.3″N 80°54′42.3″W

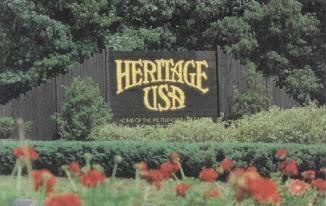
- Type: Private
- Industry: Amusement park; hotel; cable television network
- Founded: 1978
- Defunct: 1989
- Fate: Chapter 11 bankruptcy
- Successors: Hotel and convention center reopened in 2004 as Heritage International Ministries; Television studios and production facility reopened in 2009 by The Broadcast Group
- Headquarters: Fort Mill, South Carolina
- Key people: Jim Bakker and Tammy Faye Bakker
- Number of employees: ~ 2500
- Parent: Heritage Village Church & Missionary Fellowship, Inc.

Heritage USA was an American Christian-themed water park, theme park and residential complex in Fort Mill, South Carolina, built by televangelist Jim Bakker and his wife Tammy Faye Bakker, founders of The PTL Club.

The park, which occupied 2,300 acres (9.3 km^{2}; 3.6 sq mi), was built by church builder Roe Messner. Since its closure in 1989, projects have been constructed on the land it once occupied, portions of which have been sold to several companies.

In 2004, MorningStar Fellowship Church purchased the Heritage USA Grand Hotel and Conference Center and fifty-two acres of surrounding property, renaming it Heritage International Ministries.

== History ==
Heritage USA opened in 1978, and by 1986 employed around 2,500 people. The facilities included the 501-room Heritage Grand Hotel, the attraction Main Street USA, an indoor shopping complex, the Heritage Village Church, Upper Room, a 400-unit campground, the Jerusalem Amphitheater, conference facilities, King's Castle, a skating rink, prayer and counseling services, cable television production studios, Bible and evangelism school, visitor retreat housing, staff and volunteer housing, timeshares and the Heritage Island water park and recreational facilities. By its own estimate it was the third-largest theme park by attendance, with what it reported was 4.9 million visitors per year, behind only Walt Disney World in Orlando, Florida, and Disneyland in Anaheim, California. Heritage USA was described as a Christian version of Disneyland; before the scandal leading to its closure, Jim Bakker had plans to expand the park.

At Heritage USA's peak in the mid-1980s, it earned $126 million per year, but a combination of events began to take their toll.

=== Falwell's slide ===
Falwell on the water slide

External videos
- PTL: Jerry Falwell goes down waterslide. September 11, 1987. (9:24)

In 1987, televangelist Jerry Falwell, dressed in a business suit, "plunged" down the Typhoon, a 163-foot (50 m) "hellish" water slide, fulfilling "a promise made during a fund-raising drive that netted $20 million for the debt-ridden PTL". Photographs of Falwell's water slide plunge circulated worldwide. This drive eventually took the PTL Club and Heritage USA from Jim Bakker.

=== Closure ===
It was reported that Jim Bakker "arranged for Falwell to take over PTL in March in an effort to avoid what he called a 'hostile takeover' of the television ministry by people threatening to expose a sexual encounter he admitted to having seven years earlier with church secretary Jessica Hahn." Bakker received public condemnation for, along with John Fletcher, a man in his employ, raping and drugging Hahn in 1980. Jerry Falwell said the park competed unfairly with tax-paying attractions and that the tax-exempt ministry should be separated from PTL's business interests. Under Falwell's leadership, Heritage USA sought Chapter 11 bankruptcy protection with debts estimated at $72 million. In 1988, PTL lost its tax-exempt status.

In return for a promised lifetime annual four-day vacation stay, 165,000 people had donated $1,000 to Jim Bakker's planned Heritage USA hotel tower; each donor received $6.54 in compensation. Bakker's legal and personal troubles made headlines, and in September 1989, Hurricane Hugo caused severe damage to many of the buildings. Heritage USA closed shortly after the storm.

== Redevelopment efforts ==
In 1991, the Heritage USA property was purchased for $52 million by San Diego evangelist Morris Cerullo in partnership with a Malaysian investment group, MUI Group (Malayan United Industries Berhad). The property was renamed "New Heritage USA". The partnership between Cerullo and MUI ended over a disagreement concerning Cerullo's issuance of discount cards for the theme park. MUI filed suit against Cerullo and ultimately bought out his interest in the venture, renaming the property Regent Park.

MUI is the parent company of Laura Ashley plc, which moved its US headquarters and distribution center to the property. The corporate offices of Laura Ashley are located in the former PTL World Outreach Center, a pyramid-shaped building that formerly housed the Bakkers' offices and those of the leaders of PTL. Since MUI purchased the building, it has been renamed "The Regent Building". Through its local subsidiary Regent Carolina Corporation, MUI built a golf course and residential development on most of the former Heritage USA property.

For a short period in the 1990s, MUI operated the 501-room hotel and resort under a management agreement with Radisson Hotels, calling the property the "Radisson Grand Resort," but the complex was not successful as a secular venture and ultimately closed and fell into disrepair. In December 2004, the remainder of the property was sold to Coulston Enterprises, owned by local developer and former MUI executive Earl Coulston. Coulston Enterprises sold portions of the property that had housed the PTL Ministry to MorningStar Ministries of Charlotte, headed by Rick Joyner; and Flames-of-Fire Ministries of Fort Mill, headed by Coulston's wife Sabrina.

MorningStar has undertaken ongoing renovations to the portions of the property purchased by the ministry, including the Heritage tower, despite a few wishing to see the tower torn down and erecting a new billboard on Interstate 77 calling for its demolition. The buildings that had housed Flames-of-Fire were sold to The Broadcast Group, a television and multi-media production company headed by Dr. Dale Hill, who formerly worked for Bakker and PTL. Coulston Enterprises has developed several new subdivisions that include houses and restaurants on the remainder of the property.

In January 2006, a 24-hour prayer ministry opened at the former Heritage USA. Musicians and prayer leaders formed the Zadok House of Prayer (ZHOP) after relocating from the International House of Prayer in Kansas City. In April 2009, ZHOP vacated the grounds, and the building that housed their ministry, a former PTL warehouse complex, was sold to MorningStar Fellowship Church. It now houses MorningStar's K–12 private school Comenius School of Creative Leadership. In late 2006, the IRS placed a tax lien for $13.2 million on Regent Carolina Corporation, which had not yet transferred control of the golf course, common areas and roads to the Regent Park homeowners association. The golf course was subsequently sold to Southern Gailes. In 2018, Rick Joyner expressed interest in rebuilding the theme park.

=== Cable network ===
Cerullo retained control of PTL's cable network, which at the time was known as "The Inspirational Network", ultimately moving it to Charlotte, North Carolina, and renaming it "The New Inspirational Network".

As of March 2018, it is known as The Inspiration Network (INSP).

== Legacy ==
=== The Barn and PTL Studios ===
Coulston entered into a lease/purchase agreement in April 2009 with The Broadcast Group for the portion of the property encompassing the former Barn auditorium, Total Learning Center and PTL Television Network Studios. The studio production facility was renamed "The Broadcast Group Complex". The former PTL Television Studios and adjacent Total Learning Center complex were almost immediately renovated and reopened upon the closing of the lease/purchase agreement in 2009. The Barn Auditorium renovations were completed in April 2012 and the facility was reopened and renamed "The Barn at Regent Park".

In February 2014, The Broadcast Group suddenly relocated their operations from the buildings to a nearby office park in Fort Mill and shortly afterwards it was announced that all of the buildings and the surrounding 18-acre (72.800 m^{2}) property had been acquired by Antioch International Church, which operated from a converted/renovated former PTL warehouse near the Heritage Grand Hotel, for $3.81 million on April 24, 2014; according to York County, South Carolina tax records. Antioch moved their church to a property at 8400 Regent Parkway (address since renumbered/renamed 453 Glynwood Forest Drive) and now uses the former Barn Auditorium as their new church home. The complex comprising The Barn and the studios has since been renamed The River Place.

=== The Upper Room ===
In January 2009, a group called "Friends of The Upper Room" created an online petition to Flames-of-Fire Ministry and Coulston Enterprises—then owners of The Upper Room—asking them to consider donating the property to another ministry or selling it at a reduced price to save the property from rumored demolition plans. The Upper Room building and surrounding properties were placed on the market.

In November 2010, over 565 people had signed the petition and rumors that The Upper Room's owners planned to demolish it continued to circulate. In May 2010, the Friends of the Upper Room called for interested people worldwide to pray daily to ensure the building's future. On November 19, 2010, it was announced that The Upper Room had been acquired by Christian concert promoter Russell James, who planned to begin renovations on December 1, 2010, with planned opening date of January 1, 2011; it would be known as the Upper Room Chapel.

The facility underwent extensive restoration; the outdoor "Walk of Faith" was restored and is again used as a house of intercessory prayer. It will ultimately be open 24 hours a day, with live video streaming through a website.

=== Heritage Grand Hotel redevelopment ===
MorningStar Fellowship Church bought the tower from Coulston Enterprises in 2004 on the condition that the tower be torn down in two years, or Coulston would be paid $300,000. York County approved a development plan in 2005 that would have required the tower be torn down. Later, MorningStar persuaded the county to let the ministry complete the tower. In 2013, MorningStar sued the county for breaching the development agreement, and the county claimed MorningStar did. The county continued to appeal its claims until 2019, and a joint agreement in 2020 gave MorningStar time to start the process of finishing the tower for senior housing. The county reinstated lawsuits in 2021, and continued to claim the tower should have come down by 2013 because it is unfit for the purpose. On March 16, 2022, the county stated in a news release that it never stood in MorningStar's way but says codes require an unsafe building to be demolished. Numerous supporters of MorningStar asked York County Council to change its mind, and MorningStar filed another legal motion. In 2026, York County and MorningStar reached an agreement to demolish the hotel and build a new senior living facility on the property.

=== King's Castle demolition ===
On March 19, 2013, developer Earl Coulston, who had purchased much of the former Heritage USA property, began demolishing "The King's Castle", an abandoned arcade and go-kart track that was originally intended to house the world's largest Wendy's restaurant. The building was under construction at the time of the Bakkers' departure in the late 1980s; construction ceased when Heritage USA entered bankruptcy and payments to contractor Roe Messner were stopped. The castle was later completed by Heritage USA's then-new owner Regent Carolina Corporation (f/k/a New Heritage Carolina Corporation), a subsidiary of MUI Corporation of Malaysia. It was used for several years as an arcade and go-kart track before closing and falling into disrepair and abandonment.

Coulston jointly owned the building with neighboring MorningStar Fellowship Church as his property line ran through the rear portion of the building. MorningStar had originally intended the castle to be renovated and used as a youth center but later determined that it had been too heavily vandalized and was in too much disrepair to renovate. Coulston approached MorningStar and offered to pay for the cost of demolition because it was partially on his property and abutted a nearby housing complex he was developing. As soon as demolition began, it was halted the same day because the contractor did not have proper permission from either the State of South Carolina or York County. Demolition resumed once the proper permits were secured and the site has since been cleared.

=== Jerusalem Amphitheater/King's Arena ===
The property encompassing the "Jerusalem Amphitheater" (also known as "King's Arena") and campground is owned by Earl Coulston. The campgrounds have been renovated and are now known as Crown Cove RV Park. The outdoor amphitheater has been demolished. A large portion of the amphitheater was demolished as part of Coulston's plan to retrofit it with a roof and turn it into a venue for youth concerts. This never materialized and the amphitheater remained abandoned for many years before being demolished in October 2012.

== See also ==
- List of defunct amusement parks
- List of water parks
