= Trump Park Avenue =

Residential building in Manhattan, New York

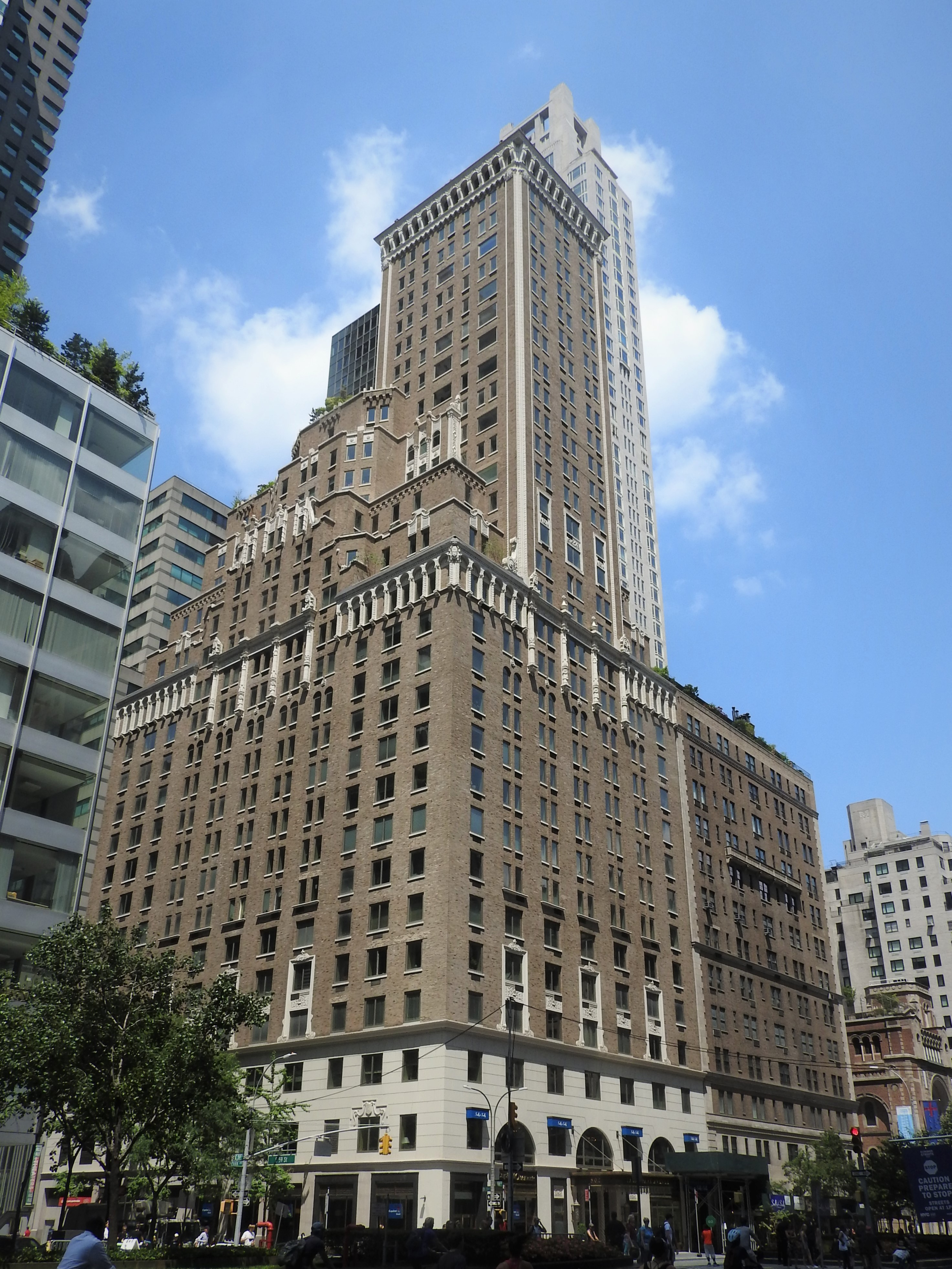
- Trump Park Avenue
- Interactive map of the Trump Park Avenue area

General information
- Type: Residential condominium (formerly hotel)
- Location: 502 Park Avenue, New York City, United States
- Coordinates: 40.7631763°N 73.9698578°W
- Completed: 1928
- Owner: The Trump Organization

Technical details
- Floor count: 35

Design and construction
- Architect: Emery Roth (attributed)

Website
- 502parkavenue.com

Trump Park Avenue is a residential condominium building at 502 Park Avenue in the Lenox Hill neighborhood of Manhattan, New York City. The 35-story building was completed in 1927–28 as the Hotel Delmonico and is attributed to architect Emery Roth, who designed numerous luxury hotels and apartment buildings in New York City during the early 20th century.

The building operated as a hotel for much of the 20th century under the Delmonico name. Hotel operations ceased by the early 2000s.

In 2001, the property was acquired by The Trump Organization and subsequently converted into luxury residential condominiums. The redevelopment was completed in the early 2000s, and the building reopened as Trump Park Avenue. The renovation preserved the original limestone façade while fully redesigning the interior for residential use.

== History ==
The building was completed in 1928 as a 35-story skyscraper hotel developed by Benjamin Winter Sr. during a period of rapid hotel construction in Manhattan in the late 1920s. Designed as a high-rise hotel with modern amenities, it reflected the expansion of luxury residential and transient accommodation along Park Avenue in the interwar period.

The hotel originally opened as the Viceroy Hotel. It was shortly thereafter renamed the Cromwell Arms, before becoming known as the Hotel Delmonico in 1929. The adoption of the "Delmonico" name followed the opening of a restaurant using that name within the building; it had no direct connection to the original Delmonico's or the Delmonico family, whose restaurants had ceased operations earlier in the decade. Contemporary disputes over the commercial use of the name reflected its fragmented ownership following the closure of the original business.

On August 28, 1964, Bob Dylan met the Beatles and their manager Brian Epstein at the hotel. The meeting, widely reported in later accounts, was among the first between the artists and has been described as culturally significant. Dylan is widely reported to have introduced the group to cannabis during the encounter, an episode frequently cited in biographies and retrospective coverage. The Beatles' stay also drew large crowds of fans outside the hotel, requiring police presence to control access to the building.

The building was converted to apartments in 1974, although parts of the lower floors continued in commercial use. In 1977, Christie's established a major New York salesroom in the building's second-floor ballroom, marking a significant expansion of its presence in the United States.

From 1976 into the early 1990s, the ground floor housed Regine's, a nightclub and restaurant operated by Régine Zylberberg, which became associated with New York nightlife of the period.

In 1990, the property was reconverted to hotel use by real estate investor Sarah Korein. In 2001, it was purchased for $115 million by The Trump Organization, which undertook a renovation led by architect Costas Kondylis and reopened the property as Trump Park Avenue. The redevelopment retained the building's exterior facade while substantially reconstructing the interior for mixed hotel and residential use.

The building subsequently operated as a mixed-use property, with hotel suites and condominium residences.

In 2019, the Trump Organization filed a lawsuit against Prince Faisal bin Abdul Majeed al-Saud seeking unpaid rent relating to a residential unit in the building.

== Architecture ==
The building is a 34–35-story high-rise located on Park Avenue in Manhattan's Upper East Side. It was originally constructed in 1927–28 as a luxury hotel during a period of intensive high-rise hotel development in New York City.

The design is commonly attributed to architect Emery Roth, who was responsible for a number of prominent residential hotels and apartment buildings in Manhattan during the early 20th century. However, detailed original commissioning records for the project are limited, and attribution is generally based on stylistic analysis and secondary historical sources.

The exterior is characteristic of late-1920s luxury hotel architecture in New York, employing a limestone façade with restrained classical detailing consistent with contemporary Park Avenue developments. The building's massing reflects the zoning influences of the 1916 Zoning Resolution, with setbacks incorporated to allow light and air to reach the street.

In the early 2000s, the building underwent an extensive interior reconstruction led by architect Costas Kondylis following its acquisition by the Trump Organization. The renovation converted the former hotel into a mixed residential and hotel condominium development, while retaining the original exterior façade.

The redevelopment significantly reconfigured the interior floor plan to accommodate modern luxury residential units, while preserving selected historic architectural elements where feasible.

== Notable residents ==
- Lucille Ball – actress and comedian, best known for I Love Lucy.
- Angela Chen – business executive and investor in media and real estate.
- Michael Cohen – lawyer and former personal attorney to Donald Trump.
- Donny Deutsch – advertising executive and television personality.
- Lorenz Hart – lyricist known for Broadway collaborations with Richard Rodgers.
- Eric Kuhn – finance executive and investment professional.
- Jared Kushner – investor, real estate developer, and former White House adviser.
- Matt Lauer – television journalist and former co-anchor of Today.
- Rupert Murdoch – media mogul and founder of News Corp.
- Wendi Deng Murdoch – businesswoman and film producer.
- Alex Rodriguez – former professional baseball player and businessman.
- Ronnie Spector – singer and lead vocalist of The Ronettes.
- Ed Sullivan – television host known for The Ed Sullivan Show.
- Thomas Tighe – nonprofit executive and CEO of Direct Relief.
- Jonathan Tisch – businessman and chairman of Loews Hotels.
- Steve Tisch – film producer and co-owner of the New York Giants.
- Ivanka Trump – businesswoman and former White House adviser.
- Paula White – televangelist and prosperity gospel preacher.
- Randy White – evangelical pastor and minister.
- Charles Seymour Whitman – former Governor of New York (1915–1918).
