= Carpenter's Home Church =

Coordinates: 28.0990°N 81.9646°W

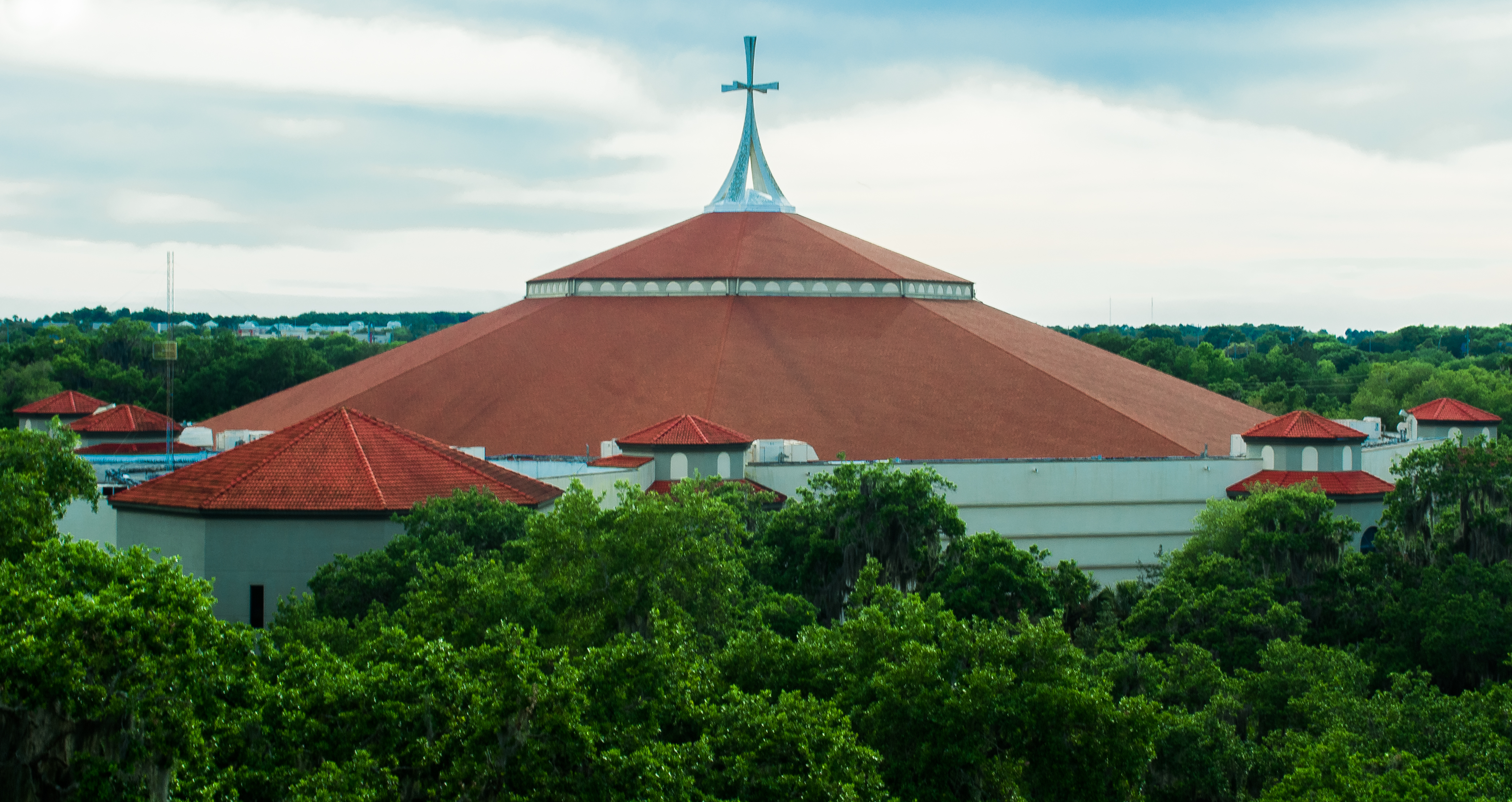
- Carpenter's Home Church in 2014
- Carpenter's Home Church
- Country: United States
- Denomination: Pentecostal

History
- Status: Defunct
- Founded: 1921

Architecture
- Completed: 1985
- Closed: 2011
- Demolished: March 2015

Carpenter's Home Church was a prominent Pentecostal megachurch in Lakeland, Florida, affiliated with the Assemblies of God USA. Opened in 1985, the church claimed nearly 7,000 worshipers at its peak. The church closed amidst financial scandal and dwindling attendance. The remaining members became two separate congregations, one of which became prominent as the host of the Lakeland Revival in 2008. The property was purchased by Without Walls International Church of Tampa, Florida, and the facility became the home of their affiliate Without Walls Central Church. Without Walls experienced financial difficulties requiring them to sell their properties. The building was eventually acquired by developers and demolition commenced in March 2015. Today, nothing remains of the building.

== History ==
The church was founded in 1921 as Lakeland First Assembly of God. However, its modern history began when Karl Strader became senior pastor in 1966. Strader's tenure saw a period of explosive growth. By 1980, the church had ballooned to 4,000 members, and had overgrown its 16-year-old facility.

Looking for a place to build a new, larger sanctuary, Strader found land originally owned by the United Brotherhood of Carpenters and Joiners of America, who built a retirement home for their members on it. The "Carpenters and Joiners Home" was dedicated in October 1928 and the first 36 retired carpenters and joiners moved in during March 1929. As many as 370 retirees stayed at one time. With the advent of Social Security, the number of retirees living in the home began to decline. By 1976, the home closed.

When First Assembly bought the plot in 1980, some of the land was sold off, and a 10,000 seat auditorium was built by Roe Messner. The new building opened in 1985, and First Assembly changed its name to Carpenter's Home Church.

Many Contemporary Christian and Gospel artists performed at the church, including Steven Curtis Chapman, Michael W. Smith, Newsboys, Plus One, The Florida Mass Choir, Skillet, Audio Adrenaline, OC Supertones, Carman, TobyMac, Petra, and Zoegirl, among others. While in operation, the church ran a 100,000 watt FM Stereo radio station, WCIE, that served the Tampa Bay market; the station was sold to Moody Broadcasting in 1997. Also, several conferences were held here including the Dawson McCalister Conference for youth age.

The church suffered a split in 1989, when about 800 members left in a dispute over Karl Strader's leadership. Strader had long been open to charismatic practices such as spontaneous dancing and singing, which caused chagrin among some of the church's more traditional members. Although he was placed on probation, a congregational vote resulted in an overwhelming vote of confidence for Strader. However, some 800 members broke away to form Victory Church.

In 1994, Daniel Strader, one of Karl Strader's sons, was arrested on fraud charges and was later convicted. Daniel Strader had sold false securities and defrauded investors out of $2.3 million. He was found guilty in 1995 on 238 counts of securities fraud and was sentenced to 45 years' imprisonment. The severe sentence resulted from the application of the Racketeer Influenced and Corrupt Organizations Act. The scandal received considerable media coverage; membership of Carpenter's Home Church dwindled, and it became impossible for the church to maintain its large facilities.

In 2002, Without Walls Central Church commenced renting the building for services. This church was a branch of Randy and Paula White's Without Walls International Church, that had outgrown its building in nearby Auburndale. Eventually, in 2005, the property was sold to the Without Walls churches for $8 million in cash and the Auburndale building.

Carpenter's Home Church used the cash to purchase and convert a former retail warehouse a mile north of the old location on US-98, which was called Ignited Church, and Karl Strader's son Stephen was installed as pastor. The Auburndale property was renamed Auburndale Life Church and Karl Strader's son-in-law Shane Simmons was installed as pastor (Simmons died from cancer in March 2013). The remaining members of Carpenter's Home Church dispersed between these two churches, though Ignited Church claims to be the successor of Carpenter's Home Church (according to Stephen Strader's biography, Carpenter's Home changed its name to Ignited Church when Stephen became pastor).

The Without Walls churches experienced problems and vacated the Lakeland building in 2011. As a result of debts, the United States bankruptcy court required Without Walls to sell their properties. In February 2015, it was reported that the land and building had been purchased by developers who were planning to demolish the church. Demolition commenced on 16 March 2015.

== Evangel Christian School ==
The existing retirement home building on the site was used to house Evangel Christian School, which had been operated by First Lakeland Assembly of God since 1972. The school closed in 2006 following the sale of the land and properties to the Without Walls churches. A number of students moved to Victory Academy, operated by Victory Church, following the closure.

== Revivals ==
Carpenter's Home Church and its successor entities have been associated with two prominent revivals. A 1993 revival by South African-born evangelist Rodney Howard-Browne helped spread a "Laughing revival" with manifestations of joy in the Holy Spirit; the Toronto Blessing movement is as an offshoot of the spiritual awakening that Howard-Browne started at his Lakeland Revival. Howard-Browne's revival lasted for 16 weeks at Carpenter's Home, often holding two services a day and averaging 3,000 to 4,000 visitors at night.

The Todd Bentley led Lakeland Revival of 2008 began at Ignited Church and was later moved to Auburndale Life Church. As attendance increased, it eventually was moved to the Lakeland Civic Center.
