= Craig Winn =

American businessman

Craig Winn is an American businessman noted for founding Value America, a tech company that failed in one of the more spectacular crashes of the Dot-com bubble in 2000.

== Business career ==
In 1977 Winn joined his father's company, Winn Co., after graduating from the University of Southern California with business degrees in marketing and finance. There he worked as a manufacturer's representative.

In 1986, he founded and built a lighting company called Dynasty which he brought public in 1990, making him his first fortune. The company went bankrupt in 1993.

In 1996, he became a Dot.com entrepreneur when he founded Value America, an early ecommerce vendor that was briefly second only to Amazon.com. The company raised investments from Paul Allen and Frederick W. Smith, among others. By December 1999, Winn had resigned from the board after disagreeing with all but one of the rest of the board regarding restructuring. Value America filed for bankruptcy in August 2000, less than a year after its IPO. It was one of the first large dotcoms to fail. It was one of the "most notorious" crashes of the Dot-com bubble.

== Writing ==
Winn's book In the Company of Good and Evil: A True Story of Seduction and Betrayal (original title, In the Company of Good and Evil: From Zero to 3 Billion and Back Again), with co-author Ken Power, is about his experience with Value America. The book proposed remedies for the kind of chicanery that had enabled Winn and Power to earn fortunes and help cause a stock market crash.

After the September 11 attacks, Winn and his colleague at Value America Ken Power to wrote a self-published book called Tea With Terrorists. Following the airing of a segment about Tea with Terrorists on The 700 Club, the Council of Imams and Preachers of Kenya (CIPK) likened the book to The Satanic Verses by Salman Rushdie, asserted the Tea with Terrorists was blasphemy, and demanded that it be banned.

== Bibliography ==
- Yada Yahweh: A Conversation with God, Cricketsong Books (? 2007)
- Prophet Of Doom: Islam's Terrorist Dogma In Muhammad's Own Words, Faithworks (April 2004)
- Tea With Terrorists: Who They Are, Why They Kill, What Will Stop Them Faithworks (October 2002), (ISBN 9780971448117)
- In the Company of Good and Evil: A True Story of Seduction and Betrayal Cricketsong Books (January 2002)
- Questioning Paul
