= White House Office of Faith-Based and Neighborhood Partnerships =

U.S. office within the White House Office

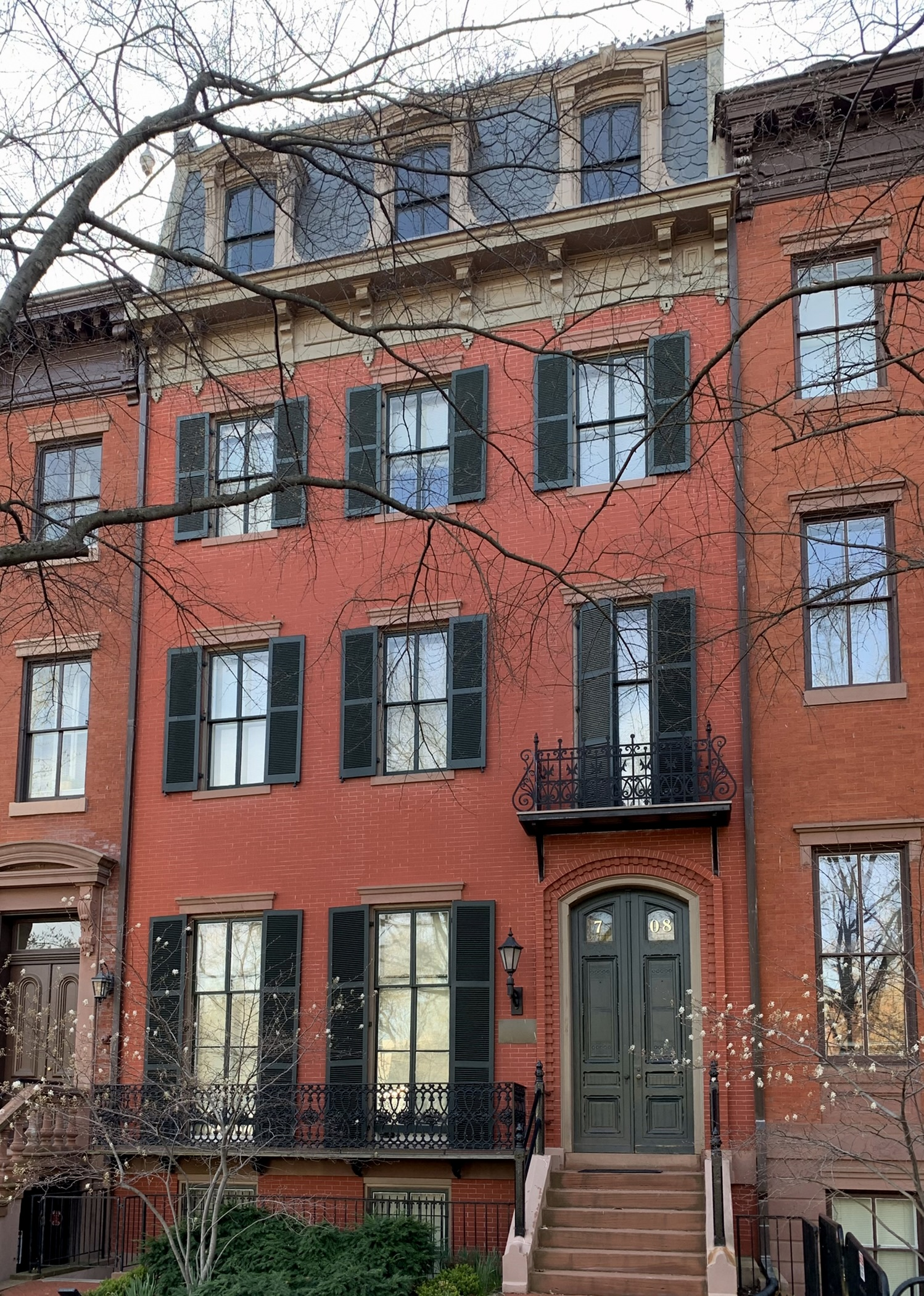
Former White House Office of Faith-Based and Community Initiatives building on Jackson Place in Washington, D.C.

The White House Office of Faith-Based and Neighborhood Partnerships, formerly known as the Office of Faith-Based and Community Partnerships, was an office within the White House Office that was part of the Executive Office of the President of the United States.

The office was established by the George W. Bush administration in 2001. During the first Trump administration, it was inactive and replaced by an initiative centered around Centers for Faith and Opportunity Initiatives. It was reinstated by the Biden administration, but abolished by the second Trump administration and replaced with the White House Faith Office.

== History ==
=== George W. Bush administration (2001–2009) ===
OFBCI was established by President George W. Bush through an executive order on January 29, 2001, representing one of the key domestic policies of Bush's campaign promise of "compassionate conservatism." The initiative sought to strengthen faith-based and community organizations and expand their capacity to provide federally funded social services, positing that these groups were well-situated to meet the needs of local individuals. As Texas governor, Bush had used the "Charitable Choice" provisions of the 1996 welfare reform (which allowed "faith-based" entities to compete for government contracts to deliver social services) to support the work of faith-based groups in Texas. Established religions offer a critical financial contribution to the overall effort and effect of social services (e.g., community services with health care financing) in the US.

The office was briefly led by Don Willett, an aide from Bush's tenure as governor of Texas who was later appointed a justice of the Supreme Court of Texas. The first person named as director of the OFBCI was John DiIulio, a University of Pennsylvania political science professor. DiIulio later left the office and became a critic of the Bush administration.

Critics of the OFBCI, including Americans United for Separation of Church and State and the American Civil Liberties Union, assert that it violated the Establishment Clause by using tax money to fund religion. They also argued that faith-based initiatives were used as part of electoral strategies to yield more votes for Bush and the GOP.

For fiscal year 2005, more than $2.2 billion in competitive social service grants were awarded to faith-based organizations. Between fiscal years 2003 and 2005, the total dollar amount of all grants awarded to FBOs increased by 21 percent (GAO 2006:43). The majority of these grants were distributed through state agencies to local organizations in the form of formula grants (GAO 2006:17).

==== Establishment clause issues ====
Faith-based organizations are eligible to participate in federally administered social service programs to the same degree as any other group, although certain restrictions on FBOs that accept government funding have been created by the White House to avoid violations of the Establishment Clause.

- They may not use direct government funds to support inherently religious activities such as prayer, worship, religious instruction, or proselytization.
- Any inherently religious activities that the organizations may offer must be offered separately in time or location from services that receive federal assistance.
- FBOs cannot discriminate on the basis of religion when providing services (GAO 2006:13).

=== Obama administration (2009–2017) ===
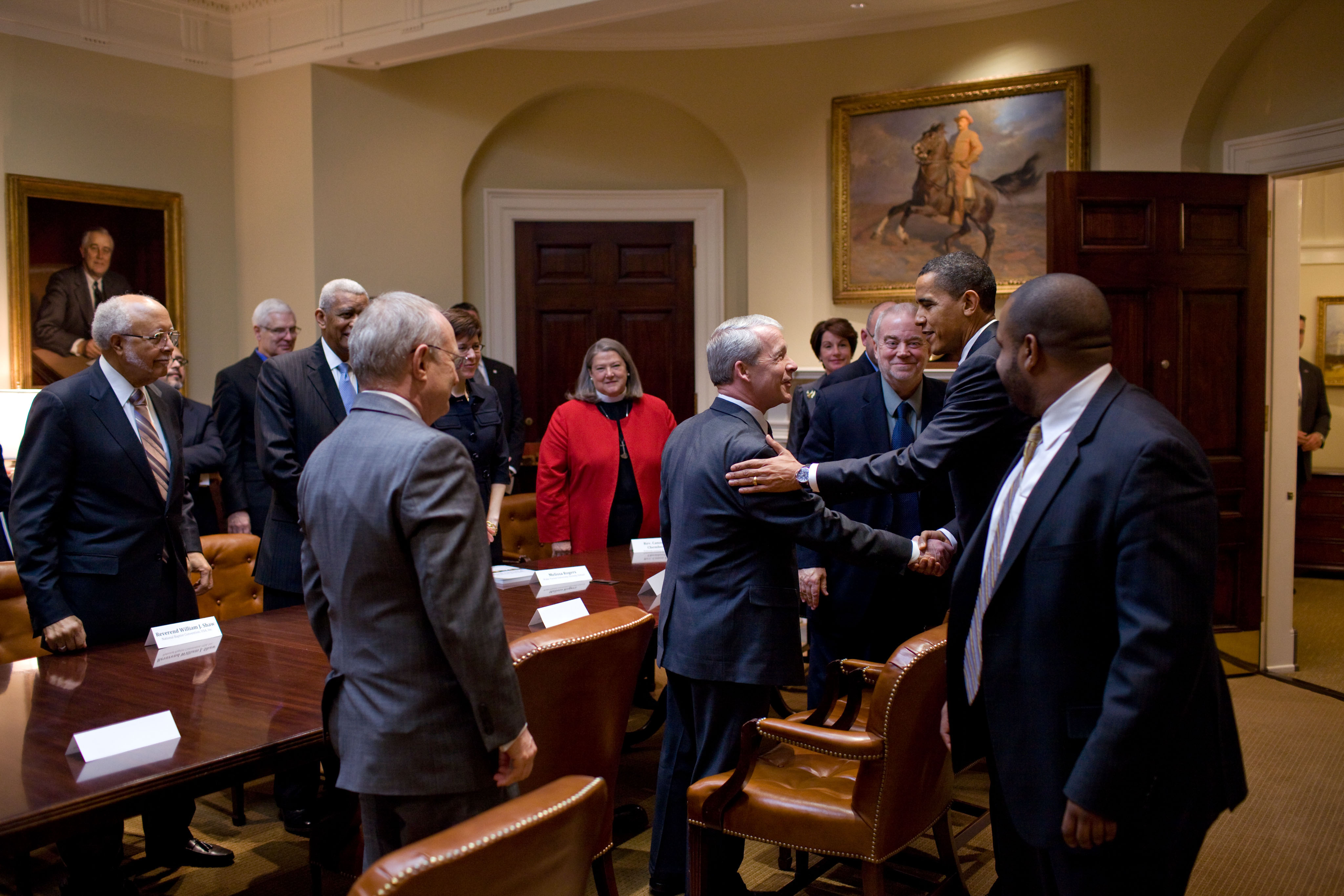
President Barack Obama greets and thanks members of the President's Council on Faith-Based and Neighborhood Partnerships during a drop by in the Roosevelt Room of the White House, March 9, 2010.

President Barack Obama renamed the office to "White House Office of Faith-Based and Neighborhood Partnerships" and appointed Joshua DuBois as its head. He also established an advisory council, composed of religious and secular leaders and scholars from different backgrounds. Each member of the council was appointed to a one-year term.

According to ABC News, the office would seek "to expand the role of this office as it relates to policy issues where religious and local leaders can be effective. DuBois would coordinate with faith-based and community organizations on social service outreach and work to utilize these organizations' efforts to advance the administration's policies, with a primary focus on poverty." Joshua DuBois resigned as director in February 2013 and was succeeded by Melissa Rogers in March.

=== First Trump administration (2017–2021) ===
Following the election of President Donald Trump, the office remained without a director; the website was no longer available.

In May 2018, Trump started the Faith and Opportunity Initiative, a new White House office to help faith-based organizations get equal access to government funding. The initiative centered around Centers for Faith and Opportunity Initiatives, bodies within U.S. federal government agencies giving religious groups more voice in government programs. The executive order on the "Establishment of a White House Faith and Opportunity Initiative" issued in May 2018 during the presidency of Donald Trump requires all executive departments to designate a Liaison for Faith and Opportunity Initiatives to coordinate with a new Advisor to the White House.

In November 2018, Scott Lloyd was appointed to the Center for Faith and Opportunity Initiatives of the United States Department of Health and Human Services (HHS). Lloyd, who had previously headed the Office of Refugee Resettlement at the HHS, is a noted opponent of abortion.

On October 31, 2019, the White House confirmed that Paula White, a televangelist, pastor, and author, would join the White House Office to advise Trump's Faith and Opportunity Initiative. She supported Trump during his 2016 campaign.

=== Biden administration (2021–2025) ===
On February 14, 2021, President Joe Biden reestablished the Office with Melissa Rogers again serving as executive director.

In March 2021, the Biden administration announced a reconfiguration of the Faith and Opportunity Initiative, emphasizing an inclusive approach to religious and community-based partnerships. This followed President Biden’s executive order that broadened the scope of the initiative to involve a wider range of faith-based and secular organizations, promoting equity across government programs. The order also underscored the importance of addressing issues such as racial justice, climate change, and COVID-19 recovery through these collaborations.

Under this restructuring, Melissa Rogers was appointed as Executive Director of the White House Office of Faith-Based and Neighborhood Partnerships. Rogers previously held this position during the Obama administration and is known for her work on religious freedom and the separation of church and state.

Additionally, the U.S. Department of Health and Human Services' Center for Faith and Opportunity Initiatives continued to engage in outreach to religious and community organizations, focusing on vaccine distribution during the COVID-19 pandemic. This initiative aimed to increase vaccination rates by leveraging the trust and influence of faith-based groups.

=== Second Trump administration (2025–present) ===
On January 20, 2025, following the second inauguration of Donald Trump, the office was disbanded through an executive order entitled "Initial Rescissions of Harmful Executive Orders and Actions." In February 2025, Trump ordered the creation of the White House Faith Office, a new White House office to assist faith-based entities, community organizations, and houses of worship in their efforts to strengthen American families, promote work and self-sufficiency, and protect religious liberty.

== Controversies ==
- The separation of church and state was noted as one of major issues with the Faith-Based Initiatives laws. Critics have claimed that millions in government grants have gone to ministries operated by political supporters of the Bush administration, or have been given to minority pastors who recently committed their support.
- In June 2006, U.S. district judge Robert W. Pratt ruled that a faith-based program called InnerChange at a Newton, Iowa prison, operated by Charles Colson's Prison Fellowship Ministries, unconstitutionally used tax money for a religious program that gave special privileges to inmates who accepted its evangelical Christian teachings and terms. "For all practical purposes," Judge Pratt said, "the state has literally established an Evangelical Christian congregation within the walls of one of its penal institutions, giving the leaders of that congregation, i.e., InnerChange employees, authority to control the spiritual, emotional, and physical lives of hundreds of Iowa inmates." [See Americans United v. Prison Fellowship Ministries, 2006 U.S. Dist. LEXIS 36970, June 2, 2006]
- On June 25, 2007, the U.S. Supreme Court ruled 5–4 in Hein v. Freedom From Religion Foundation that executive orders may not be challenged on Establishment Clause grounds by individuals whose sole claim to legal standing is that they are taxpayers. Both of President Bush's court appointees, John G. Roberts and Samuel Alito, sided with the majority.
- The second head of the department, Jim Towey, in a session of "Ask the Whitehouse" dated November 26, 2003, stated in regard to a question about pagan faith-based organizations:

I haven't run into a pagan faith-based group yet, much less a pagan group that cares for the poor! Once you make it clear to any applicant that public money must go to public purposes and can't be used to promote ideology, the fringe groups lose interest. Helping the poor is tough work and only those with loving hearts seem drawn to it.

Pagans reacted angrily to the label "fringe group", the suggestion that pagans are uncompassionate, the idea that they would apply for funding only to promote ideology, and the exclusion of pagan organizations implicit in the statement.

- Catholic League president William A. Donohue protested against the nomination of Harry Knox, a former director of Human Rights Campaign and gay rights activist, arguing that he has been dishonest and intolerant. Knox has condemned the positions of Catholic clergy on the issues of contraception and ordination of homosexuals.

== Books ==
- Owens, Michael Leo (2007). God and Government in the Ghetto: The Politics of Church-State Collaboration in Black America. University of Chicago Press. ISBN 978-0-226-64207-9.
- Daly, Lew (2006). God and the Welfare State. The MIT Press. ISBN 0-262-04236-3.
- Kuo, David (2006). Tempting Faith: An Inside Story of Political Seduction. Free Press. ISBN 0-7432-8712-6.
