= Value America =

- Industry: Retail
- Founded: 1996; 30 years ago in Nevada
- Founders: Craig Winn; Rex Scatena
- Defunct: 2000
- Fate: Assets sold to Merisel at bankruptcy
- Headquarters: Charlottesville, Virginia, United States

Value America or VA was a dot-com company founded in Nevada in 1996 by Craig Winn and Rex Scatena, and relocated to Charlottesville, Virginia in February 1998. Its business model involved connecting customers on the Web directly to manufacturers, with the intent of providing better pricing and faster shipping (a just-in-time model similar to those used by Wal-Mart and Dell). Customers could order a wide range of products from VA's website, then VA would transmit the orders directly to the manufacturers, and the manufacturers would then package the products and ship them directly to the customer. Winn referred to this concept as "convergence commerce". Value America was backed by Microsoft co-founder Paul Allen's Vulcan Ventures and FedEx co-founder Frederick W. Smith.

== Initial Success ==
Value America's initial public offering in April 1999 was a success: on the first day the stock closed at $55 a share, valuing the three-year-old profitless company at $2.4 Billion.

== Decline and bankruptcy ==
VA was plagued by communications problems with the manufacturers they worked with. At the time, the idea of selling directly to customers without a distributor involved was still new and not well tested among the large consumer products companies VA represented, and since VA had no warehouses, traditional supply lines couldn't be used. Shipments would be delayed, go missing, and arrive badly packed or with the wrong product inside. Billing was also a problem, and charge backs were difficult to perform due to the mishandling of shipped goods. VA was also harmed by problems with rebates on computers requiring the acceptance of long-term Internet access contracts, a problem that also affected several mainstream retailers and which attracted the attention of the Federal Trade Commission. Also, many of the products Value America was trying to sell were easily available in many other places, making it difficult for them to compete by methods other than low prices. Towards the end of 1999, VA decided to lower its aims, drastically reducing its product catalog and focusing on information technology products and office supplies, items that were sourced from traditional distributors. As the company floundered, Winn and executives continued to enjoy the 'dot-com lifestyle', spending large amounts of money on expensive perquisites such as private jets, company BMWs, masseuses, catering as well as plans for a large campus that were never executed.

By 2000, Value America was failing due to the negative effect that the communication problems had on their customer service. The stock had fallen to 72 cents and Value America filed to reorganize under Chapter 11 of the Bankruptcy Code on August 11, 2000. The remains of the company (in particular the custom supply chain management system they had commissioned) were sold to IT product distributor Merisel in October 2000.

The company's life was charted in the 2001 book dot.bomb: My Days and Nights at an Internet Goliath by its Senior Vice-President David Kuo.

Founder Craig Winn self-published the book In the Company of Good and Evil arguing that others are to blame for the firm's failure.
