= Lakeland Revival =

2008 American Charismatic Christian revival

The Lakeland Revival, or Florida Healing Outpouring, was a Pentecostal revival which took place from April until October 2008 in Lakeland, Florida, United States. The revival began on April 2, 2008, when evangelist Todd Bentley of Fresh Fire Ministries Canada was invited by Stephen Strader, pastor of Lakeland's Ignited Church, to lead a one-week revival, but remained there for over four months.

Ignited Church took a multimedia approach to publicizing the event, posting webcasts online. The revival streamed live via Ustream and received over 1 million hits in the first five weeks of transmissions. After the initial weeks, GOD TV, a Christian satellite channel, pre-empted its primetime programming and broadcast the Lakeland meetings nightly. The revival attracted up to 10,000 attendees nightly and around 30,000 over the week. Through its airing on GOD TV, the revival became well known by Pentecostals and Charismatics worldwide. By May 29, Bentley's ministry estimated that over 140,000 people from over forty nations had visited, and 1.2 million had watched via the Internet. By June 30, over 400,000 people from over 100 nations had attended.

As the revival grew, Strader requested the endorsement and support of New Apostolic Reformation leader C. Peter Wagner and his International Coalition of Apostolic Leaders, seeing Bentley as an apostolic leader. Though the movement's apostles were divided due to Bentley's volatility, Bentley and his revival gained the support of high-profile apostles, including Chuck Pierce and Ché Ahn, and under Wagner's leadership, a public "apostolic alignment" ceremony was held in June 2008 to bring him under their wing.

In June 2008, ABC's Nightline carried out an investigative report on Bentley, specifically scrutinizing his finances and his divine healing claims. Some days after the broadcast, Fresh Fire Ministries released a statement announcing that Bentley was taking time off "to refresh and to rest," and their Lakeland broadcasts on GOD TV were put on hold. One week later, GOD TV announced Bentley would resume the Lakeland meetings and the broadcasts continued on July 18. Bentley's and Fresh Fire's leadership of the revival ended on August 11, but the revival continued until its last service on October 12, 2008, at Ignited Church.

The Lakeland Revival was in many ways similar to revivals that occurred in the 1990s, notably the Toronto Blessing in Canada and the Brownsville Revival in Pensacola, Florida. However, the Lakeland Revival had a greater focus on divine healing, was much shorter than the previous two revivals, and was nearly inseparable from Bentley. The revival displayed many "ecstatic manifestations", and some participants claimed "esoteric experiences", such as divinely inspired visions and prophecies. In addition to claims of numerous miraculous healings, "leaders' claims that at least 25" cases of resurrection of the dead took place away from the stage.

== Background ==
Ignited Church was founded in 2005 by most of the main body of Carpenter's Home Church, a once-prominent, now defunct, Assemblies of God megachurch, whose longtime senior pastor, Karl Strader, is the father of Ignited Church's founder and senior pastor, Stephen Strader. In the 1990s, Carpenter's Home Church experienced revivals influenced by the Toronto Blessing and Rodney Howard-Browne.

== Services ==
The main focus of the services were divine healing of conditions such as cancer, deafness, diabetes, and paralysis. Testimonies of miraculous healings were common at the Lakeland meetings. Faith healing is inspired by biblical New Testament accounts of Jesus healing the sick; the contemporary practice of faith healing is important for Pentecostal and Charismatic Christians. The hope of supernatural healing explains some of its popularity, as there were many first-person accounts of miracles.

Participants in the revival were also known to sing, laugh, and shout ecstatically, and many would fall down under the influence of the Holy Spirit, according to revival leaders.

== Finances ==
The Lakeland Revival did not charge for attendance, but attendees could contribute to voluntary offerings that funded building and staff expenses. The event changed venues on a number of occasions, starting at the Ignited Church and sister church in Auburndale, and moving to the $15,000-per-night Lakeland Center and Marchant Stadium. After outgrowing its previous venues, the revival meetings moved to an air-conditioned tent that seated 10,000. On August 3, the revival meetings returned to Ignited Church. "A spokeswoman for the revival, Lynne Breidenbach, said the offerings have covered their enormous operating costs. Before the move to the airport grounds, she said the ministry paid a daily rental fee of $15,000 for the local convention center, as well as comparable fees for use of a stadium. His spokesperson didn’t know how much the current setup costs. The offerings, said Breidenbach, have not contributed to a significant infusion of cash for Bentley or his ministry." During the revival, Bentley's spokesperson said that Bentley continued "to draw his standard salary, set by his board, from his office in Canada. It is a modest salary and is in the five-figure range", and that Fresh Fire Ministries is audited annually. A newspaper in Vancouver reported that Bentley owned a home in Abbotsford, British Columbia, Canada, a 2007 GMC Sierra, and a 2003 Harley-Davidson motorcycle.

Bentley said that he would open the books for independent auditors. However, requests for financial disclosure from World Magazine were met with a comment that Bentley was "too busy keeping up with what God is doing" to provide financial information.

== Decline and impact ==
Bentley severed his association with and departed the revival under controversial circumstances on August 11. He admitted to his staff in August that he and his wife were separating and resigned from Fresh Fire Ministries. The revival continued with visiting speakers at Ignited Church until October 12, 2008. While Ignited Church continued to proclaim ongoing revival services after this date, the previous worldwide interest had faded.

The revival's impact was widespread due to the Internet and satellite television. Stephen Strader has said that Ignited Church will launch an International Apostolic Center and Ignited Network of Ministries, designed to bring together Lakeland-inspired revivals by Todd Bentley to launch the Portland Outpouring. Evangelist Hamilton Filmalter was commissioned.

== Controversy ==
The revival generated some controversy among members of the Christian community, as some leaders questioned (or even outright rejected) its authenticity. There was even criticism from inside the Charismatic/Pentecostal part of the Church. For instance, in response to concerns raised over the revival, George O. Wood, general superintendent of the Assemblies of God USA, of which Ignited Church is a member, issued a statement on revival in June 2008. While not mentioning Lakeland specifically, the statement cautioned against over-emphasis on charismatic manifestations and miracles, stating that "Miraculous manifestations are never the test of a true revival. Fidelity to God's Word is the test". A noted Charismatic Bible scholar, theologian, author, and publisher, Steven Lambert, published a series of scathing articles soon after the meetings began, denouncing them as "wildfire," i.e., a false revival or movement, and demonstrating characteristics of the occult and cultism, remonstrating their principals, participants, and promoters, as well as repudiating the doctrines and practices fostered by and under the auspices of the meetings' organizers and participants.

Religion scholar Matthew D. Taylor states that the event "raised searching questions about [C. Peter Wagner's] whole [New Apostolic Reformation] paradigm" as a number of the movement's prophets and apostles had supported Bentley because of personal revelations ostensibly from God. Wagner received backlash, and some apostles left the International Coalition of Apostolic Leaders afterward.

Other Christian leaders challenged Bentley because they view Charismatic and Pentecostal doctrine as being essentially heretical. Some criticism stemmed from some of Todd Bentley's unorthodox practices, which included shouting "Bam, Bam!" while praying for the sick and testifying to having had visions of an angel named Emma. Bentley's most controversial claims consisted of over twenty-five cases where he said the dead were raised away from the stage. In an effort to verify reported healings, Bentley's staff said they welcomed as much documentation as people were willing to give, including verification from doctors. ABC's Nightline reported that "Not a single claim of Bentley's healing powers could be independently verified." However, the Charlotte Observer reported on the same series of meetings, "The revival's media relations staff has tried to document healings. They e-mailed the Observer information on 15 people reportedly healed, providing phone numbers for each and noting that 12 had received medical verification. The Observer contacted five, plus three whose names were not provided, including Burgee. Each said God had healed them through, or related to, Bentley and the Lakeland services." Strader responded to the Nightline report with the following statement, "Strader said privacy concerns and laws forbidding the release of medical records have prevented revival officials from releasing complete information about the identities and conditions of people claiming to be healed." World Magazine also reported on looking into the validity of healing claims with mixed results.

At times, the healing services were criticized in mainstream media and on Internet blogs for the occasional violence done to the participants, in the tradition of Smith Wigglesworth. Todd Bentley was known to forcefully kick, hit, smack, or knock over participants. In one incident, a man was knocked over and lost a tooth. In another, an older woman was intentionally kicked in the face. Bentley held that the Holy Spirit led him to such actions, saying that those incidents were taken out of context and adding that miracles were happening simultaneously. Trevor Baker, who had invited Bentley to the Revival Fires Church in Dudley (UK), also defended these actions, saying: "He never does anything like that without first asking for the person's permission."
