= Melissa Rogers =

American lawyer

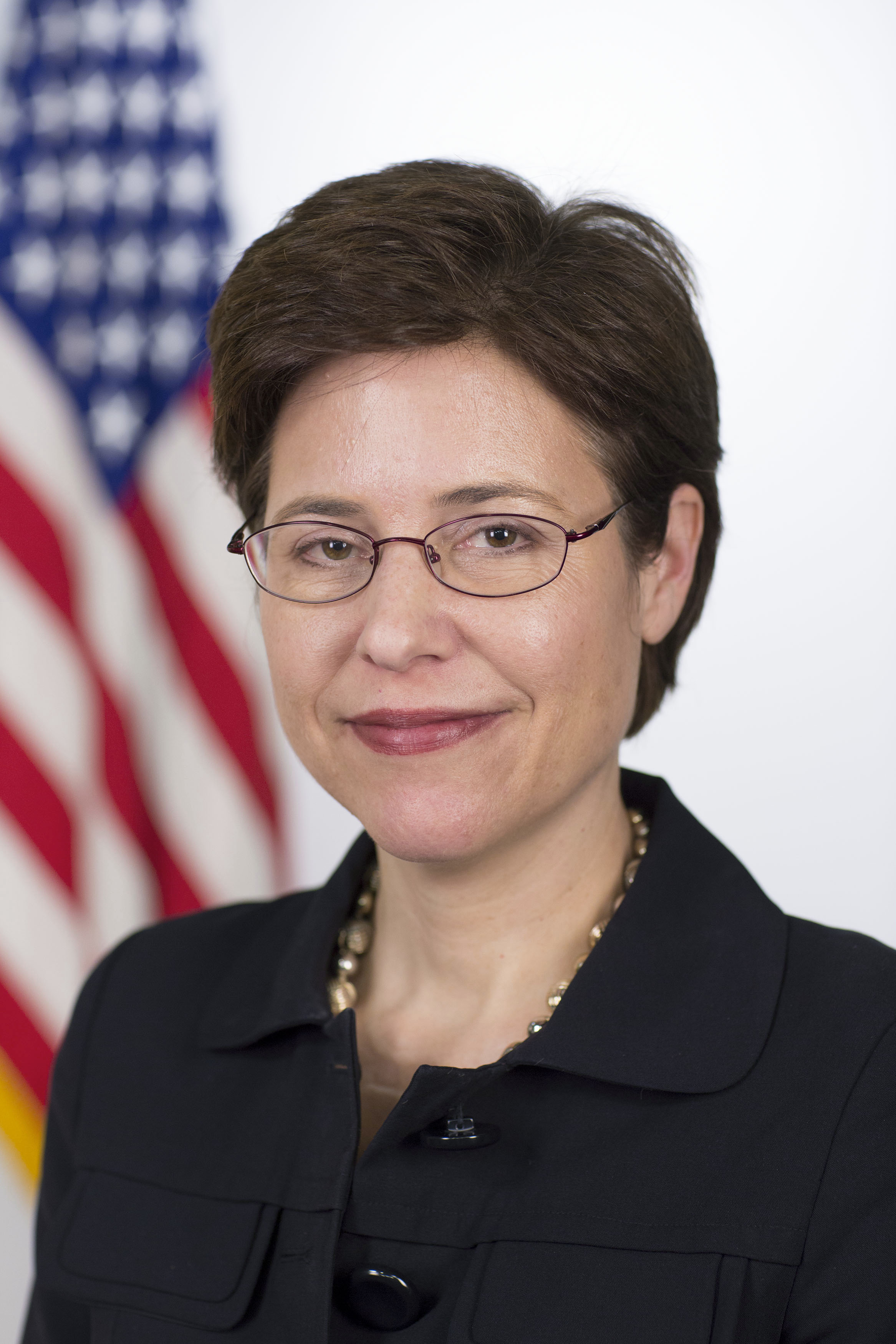

Executive Director of the White House Office of Faith-Based and Neighborhood Partnerships
- In office February 14, 2021 – January 20, 2025
- President: Joe Biden
- Deputy: Josh Dickson
- Preceded by: Paula White
- Succeeded by: Paula White
- In office March 13, 2013 – January 20, 2017
- President: Barack Obama
- Preceded by: Joshua DuBois
- Succeeded by: Paula White

Personal details
- Education: Baylor University (BA); University of Pennsylvania (JD)

Melissa Rogers is an American church-state lawyer and non-resident senior fellow in Governance Studies at the Brookings Institution. She previously served as special assistant to President Barack Obama and executive director of the White House Office of Faith-Based and Neighborhood Partnerships. On February 14, 2021, President Joe Biden designated Rogers as executive director of the reestablished Office under his administration.

== Early life and education ==
Rogers grew up a member of the Baptist Church. Rogers is a Phi Beta Kappa graduate of Baylor University and earned a Juris Doctor from the University of Pennsylvania Law School.

== Career ==
Rogers served as the director of the Center for Religion and Public Affairs at Wake Forest University Divinity School and a non-resident senior fellow at the Brooking Institution. She served as general counsel of the Baptist Joint Committee for Religious Liberty. From 2000 to 2003, she directed the Pew Forum on Religion and Public Life, a grant project of the Pew Charitable Trusts.

In 2008 Rogers co-authored a casebook, Religious Freedom and the Supreme Court, published by Baylor University Press.

In 2009, President Barack Obama appointed Rogers to serve as the chair of his Advisory Council on Faith-Based and Neighborhood Partnerships, a panel of faith and civic leaders from different religious and political backgrounds. In 2010, President Obama issued an executive order instructing federal agencies to implement a number of the panel's recommendations. That year Rogers led a group of religious and civil rights leaders in drafting Religious Expression in American Public Life: A Joint Statement of Current Law, which indicates their points of agreement with the law of church and state as it applies to religious expression in the public square. The First Freedom Center gave Rogers its First Freedom Award.

In 2011 Rogers was named to a subgroup of the U.S. State Department’s Religion and Foreign Policy Working Group. Before her appointment, Rogers had been critical of the Obama administration's handling of some church-state issues in an interview with the Huffington Post with respect to the Affordable Care Act's contraception mandate. She stated that the administration erred in only exempting houses of worship from the ACA's requirement that employers include contraception coverage in their health insurance policies. Her ideas later became the basis for the administration's accommodation of the interests of a wider set of religious entities.

In 2014, the Baptist Joint Committee gave Rogers its J.M. Dawson Religious Liberty Award. In 2015, Rogers continued to lead the White House Office of Faith-Based and Neighborhood Partnerships.

After a Sikh man in California was attacked and severely injured, Rogers represented the Obama administration at his house of worship in Rockville, Maryland, where she spoke out against hate crimes. She also spoke at a commemorative service one year after the Charleston Church Shootings.

== Publications ==
- Ronald B. Flowers, Melissa Rogers and Steve Green, Religious Freedom and the Supreme Court. Baylor University Press, 2008
- Melissa Rogers, Faith in American Public Life. Baylor University Press, 2019

Political offices
Preceded by Joshua DuBois	Director of the White House Office of Faith-Based and Neighborhood Partnerships; 2013–2017	Position abolished
