= Joshua DuBois =

American government official (born 1982)

Josh DuBois
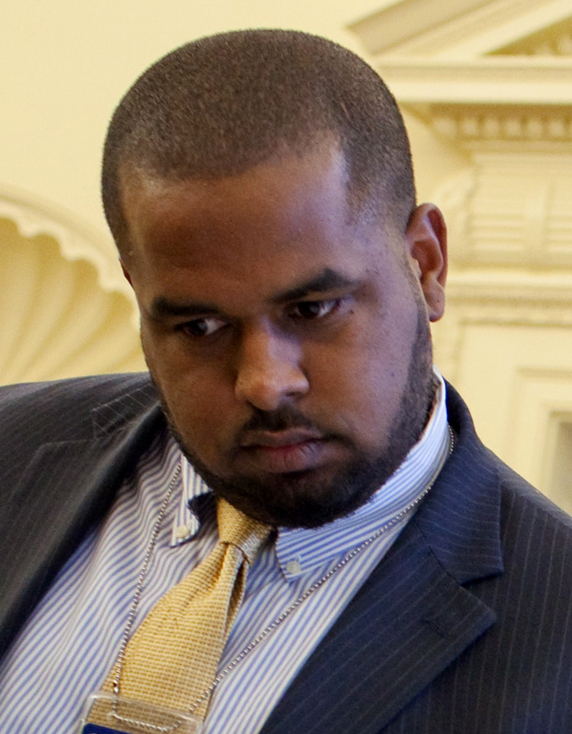

Director of the White House Office of Faith-Based and Neighborhood Partnerships
- In office February 5, 2009 – February 8, 2013
- President: Barack Obama
- Preceded by: Jedd Medefind (Faith-Based and Community Initiatives)
- Succeeded by: Melissa Rogers

Personal details
- Born: 1982 (age 43–44) Bar Harbor, Maine, U.S.
- Party: Democratic
- Education: Boston University (BA); Princeton University (MPA)

Joshua DuBois (born 1982) is an executive and former government official who served as the head of the Office of Faith Based and Neighborhood Partnerships in the Executive Office of the President of the United States from 2009 to 2013. In February 2013 he stepped down to write a book of devotionals based on the ones he sends Obama, start a consulting firm, and become the weekly religion and community solutions columnist for Newsweek and The Daily Beast. DuBois has been included among "The Root 100" and Ebony Magazine's "Power 150" lists of the most influential African Americans in the country. He also appeared on the cover of Christianity Today magazine as one of the 33 most influential Christian leaders under 33. In September 2017 it was announced that DuBois would become a CNN Contributor.

== Education ==
DuBois graduated cum laude from Boston University in 2003 with a bachelor's degree in political science. From there, he went on to Princeton University's Woodrow Wilson School of Public and International Affairs, where he earned a master's degree in public affairs in 2005. Meanwhile, he worked as an aide to Representative Rush D. Holt, Jr.

== Career ==
After watching Barack Obama's speech to the 2004 Democratic National Convention on television, DuBois decided to work for Obama, then a candidate for the U.S. Senate. Eventually, Obama hired him as a Senate aide. In 2008, DuBois was religious affairs director for the Obama presidential campaign.

In the White House, DuBois managed President Obama's fatherhood initiative, as well as the administration's work on religion in foreign affairs. He also began the tradition of the White House Easter Prayer Breakfast.

DuBois served as an informal spiritual advisor to President Obama, and still sends the President a devotional message each morning. Obama remarked at the National Prayer Breakfast that these devotions "mean the world to me."

DuBois is now co-founder of Gauge, a market research firm. He is also CEO of Values Partnerships, a consulting firm which leads social impact campaigns for films and TV shows and advises clients on issues related to culture, race and religion.

DuBois has written for Newsweek magazine, including the cover story, "The Fight for Black Men."

DuBois grew up in Nashville, the son of an African Methodist Episcopal pastor, Antoni Sinkfield and his mother, Kristy Sinkfield is a strategist at a leading academic medical center. His early religious education was in the African Methodist Episcopal Church.

He is a member of Alpha Phi Alpha Fraternity.

On April 7, 2014, DuBois delivered the annual William Belden Noble Lecture at Harvard University. He was named to Oprah's SuperSoul100 list of visionaries and influential leaders in 2016.

Political offices
Preceded by Jedd Medefind as Director of the White House Office of Faith-Based and Community Initiatives	Director of the White House Office of Faith-Based and Neighborhood Partnerships; 2009–2013	Succeeded by Melissa Rogers
