= Tempting Faith =

Book by David Kuo

Tempting Faith: An Inside Story of Political Seduction
- Author: David Kuo
- Subject: Politics
- Publisher: Free Press
- Publication date: October 2006
- Media type: Print
- Pages: 304
- ISBN: 978-0-7432-8712-8
- OCLC: 70775735
- Dewey Decimal: 973.931092 B 22
- LC Class: BR516 .K86 2006

Tempting Faith: An Inside Story of Political Seduction is a book by former Bush White House Deputy Director of the Office of Faith-Based and Community Initiatives David Kuo. The book asserts that the Republican Party, under the leadership of Karl Rove, hijacked and manipulated faith organizations to ensure their support of Republican candidates.
