= David Kuo (author) =

American government official and writer

- Born: June 26, 1968; New York City, New York
- Died: 5 April 2013 (aged 44); Charlotte, North Carolina
- Education: Tufts University
- Occupation: author

John David Kuo (June 26, 1968 – April 5, 2013) was an American author and an evangelical Christian. Kuo served as Special Assistant to President George W. Bush and deputy director of the Office of Faith-Based and Community Initiatives.

== Writing career ==
Kuo's first book was the Good Morning America book club selection, dot.bomb: My Days and Nights at an Internet Goliath, about his experiences at the online startup Value America.

Kuo's second book, Tempting Faith, briefly appeared on The New York Times Best Seller list and was a memoir about his time working with conservatives in Washington - including his stint as Special Assistant to President George W. Bush and deputy director of the Office of Faith-Based and Community Initiatives. In the book, which was released shortly before the 2006 midterm election, Kuo asserted that Christian conservatives had become political. He also said that the Bush White House used its "faith-based initiatives" program to try to recruit "unconventional" Republican voters—including the poor, minorities, and others. The White House and numerous conservative Christians disputed the claim and questioned the timing of the book's release. They also pointed out inconsistencies in Kuo's earlier statements about the Office of Faith-Based and Community Initiatives. Kuo appeared on TV and radio shows including the Colbert Report, Real Time with Bill Maher, and 60 Minutes to discuss and market the book.

Kuo wrote articles that appeared in The New York Times, Los Angeles Times, The Washington Post, and Time and was at one time learning how to write screenplays.

Kuo also had experience working in the political arena. For example, he worked on the Presidential Commission on Women in the Military and after the 1992 election, he was hired as Deputy Policy Director of Empower America (an organization started by Bill Bennett and Jack Kemp). A speechwriter during this period, he worked with politicians and businessmen ranging from Bob Dole to Steve Case.

Kuo left politics in 1996 to help start a now defunct charity, The American Compass, which was created to distribute money to small charities that served the poor.

== Personal life ==
Kuo was of Chinese and European descent. His father John T. Kuo, born in Hangzhou, China, was a geophysics professor at Columbia University. Kuo's mother Marilyn Dunlap, a Phoenix, Arizona native, was a homemaker. He was married with three daughters and a son. His interests also included bass fishing. He was a graduate of Tufts University.

Kuo died of brain cancer on April 5, 2013, in Charlotte, North Carolina.

== Books ==
- Kuo, J. David (2001-10-15). dot.bomb: My Days and Nights at an Internet Goliath. Little Brown. ISBN 0-316-50749-0.
- Kuo, David (2006-10-16). Tempting Faith: An Inside Story of Political Seduction. Free Press. ISBN 0-7432-8712-6.
