= Without Walls Central Church =

Church in Florida, United States

Coordinates: 28.0990°N 81.9646°W

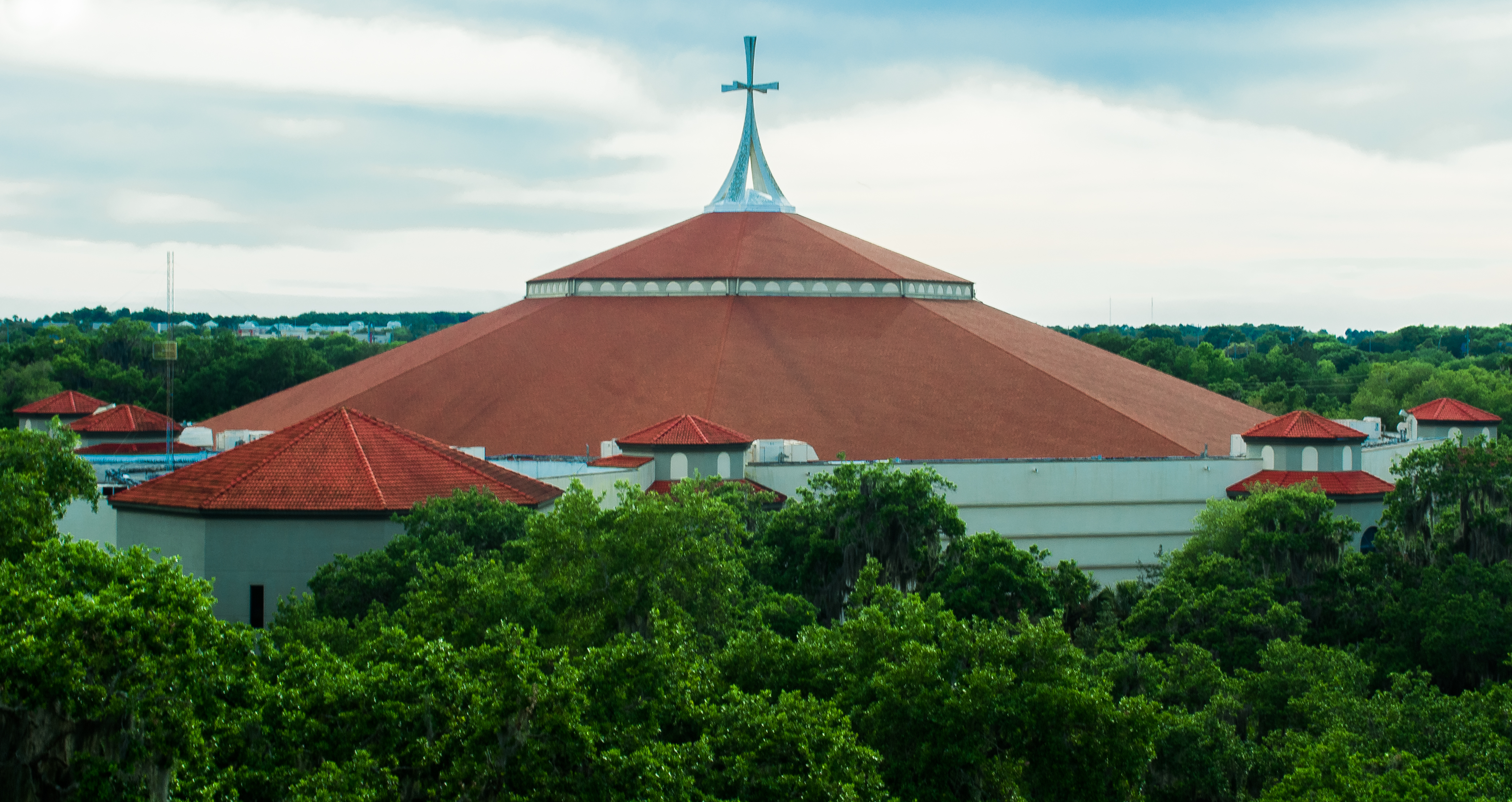
- Without Walls Central Church in 2014
- Without Walls Central Church
- Country: United States
- Denomination: non-denominational evangelical

History
- Founded: January 2004

Architecture
- Closed: 2011

Without Walls Central Church was a non-denominational evangelical Christian megachurch in Auburndale, Florida, outside Lakeland. It was under the auspices of Without Walls International Church, Tampa, Florida. The Church closed in 2011 and should not be confused with Without Walls Church, a ministry for the homeless also based in Tampa, Florida.

== History ==
It was founded by Paula and Randy White, in January 2004, when they were still married.

In one year, the congregation grew from 125 to over 1,500. With growth of this scale, the Auburndale facility quickly became inadequate and, in April 2005, Pastor Scott began two Sunday morning worship services to accommodate the attendance. This, however, was only a short-term solution, as in September 2005, Without Walls Central Church moved to a new location at the former facility of Carpenter's Home Church in Lakeland, Florida.

Pastors Scott and Cindy Thomas were the senior pastors at the church. Its operations included citywide ministry outreaches and relationships with city schools, businessmen, and government officials; networking with community organizations to help local residents; bringing well-known Christian artists and ministers to the community; and participating in city- and county-sponsored community activities.

In August 2011, services ceased at the Lakeland campus when electricity was disconnected after the church failed to pay over $50,000 in bills. The United States bankruptcy court required Without Walls to sell their properties. In February 2015, the building was purchased by developers. Demolition commenced on 16 March 2015.
