= Randy White (pastor) =

American pastor (born 1958)

- Bayshore Blvd Tampa, FL
- Born: January 11, 1958 (age 68); Frederick, Maryland, U.S.
- Occupation: Pastor
- Spouses: Debra Ellis (m. 1970; div. 1989) Paula Michelle Furr (m. 1990; div. 2007)
- Children: 3

Randall "Randy" Alan White (born January 11, 1958) is an American pastor and proponent of prosperity theology. He is the co-founder of Without Walls International Church, a large non-denominational church in Florida.

== Without Walls International Church ==
Without Walls International Church was founded by Randy White and Paula White in 1991. From 1991 to 1998, the church changed locations three times until they secured the property located at 2511 North Grady Avenue in Tampa, Florida. While the church was holding services in an outdoor tent in 1999, they reported 5,000 attendees a week and 10,000 ministered to outside of the church with 230 outreach ministries.

In 2002, Without Walls International Church began to expand to its second location in Lakeland, Florida. At this time, the church reported 14,000 members and 200 ministries including job training, evangelism among public housing projects and a teen club. On August 3, 2002, Without Walls International Church began to hold Saturday night services at Carpenter's Home Church in Lakeland renting the property. Carpenter's Home Church would later on be purchased by Without Walls International Church in 2005 for $8 million renaming the church to Without Walls Central Church.

In 2004, Without Walls International Church reported a congregation of 20,000 as the largest congregation in the area making the church the seventh largest church in the United States. In 2008, it put its 4,500–seat Tampa church up for sale, along with its 13.3-acre (5 ha) grounds and 94,000-square-foot (8,733 m^{2}) offices and television studio, asking $30 million.

On July 12, 2009, White resigned as pastor and bishop of Without Walls International Church, and Paula White, his ex-wife, was named the successor. Randy White said he was stepping down as pastor because of health and would still remain connected with the church in a different position. Randy White returned to the staff of Without Walls in July 2012.

In 2011, Without Walls Central Church was vacated due to debts. In 2014, the United States Bankruptcy Court required a sale of properties; the following year, the church building was purchased and demolished by developers. In August 2014, Without Walls announced that it had paid its debts and was moving to a new Tampa location.

=== Senate inquiry ===
On November 6, 2007, United States Senator Chuck Grassley of Iowa announced an investigation of Without Walls International Church by the United States Senate Committee on Finance along with five other ministries. Grassley asked the ministries to divulge financial information. When CBS News reported the story, Paula White's ministry denied any wrongdoing, and on March 31, 2008, the Senate Finance Committee received a joint financial report from Without Walls International Church and Paula White Ministries. The Alliance Defense Fund protested the investigation and the National Religious Broadcasters said the questions Senator Grassley asked were too broad.

On January 6, 2011, Senator Grassley concluded the investigation with no penalties and no definitive findings of wrongdoing.

== 2018 U.S. Senate campaign ==
On March 14, 2018, White filed with the Florida Department of State to run for Bill Nelson's seat in the United States Senate for the 2018 election, challenging the incumbent senator in the Democratic primary. He failed to qualify for the Democratic primary contest.

== Personal life ==
=== Family ===
White has been married twice; both marriages ended in divorce.

White and his first wife Debra Ellis (m. 1970; div. 1989) had three children. One daughter, age 30, died in 2008 from brain tumor complications. White started the Kristen Renee Foundation in her memory to advocate for the community and sue for his daughter's wrongful death. Debra Cross, née Ellis, died of cancer in 2010.

White met Paula White (née Furr) in 1987, as an associate pastor at his father's Maryland church. They divorced their respective spouses in 1989 and married each other a year later. Shortly thereafter, they moved to Tampa, Florida. He and Paula White divorced in 2007.

=== DWI charge ===
On March 18, 2011, Tampa police stopped White, then 53, around 11:30 p.m. near Ashley Drive and Interstate 275. Police recorded his blood-alcohol level at 0.093 and 0.095 percent, records show. Florida law presumes a driver to be impaired at 0.08 percent. White went on to attend rehabilitation later in 2011.
