= Paula White-Cain =

American television evangelist (born 1966)

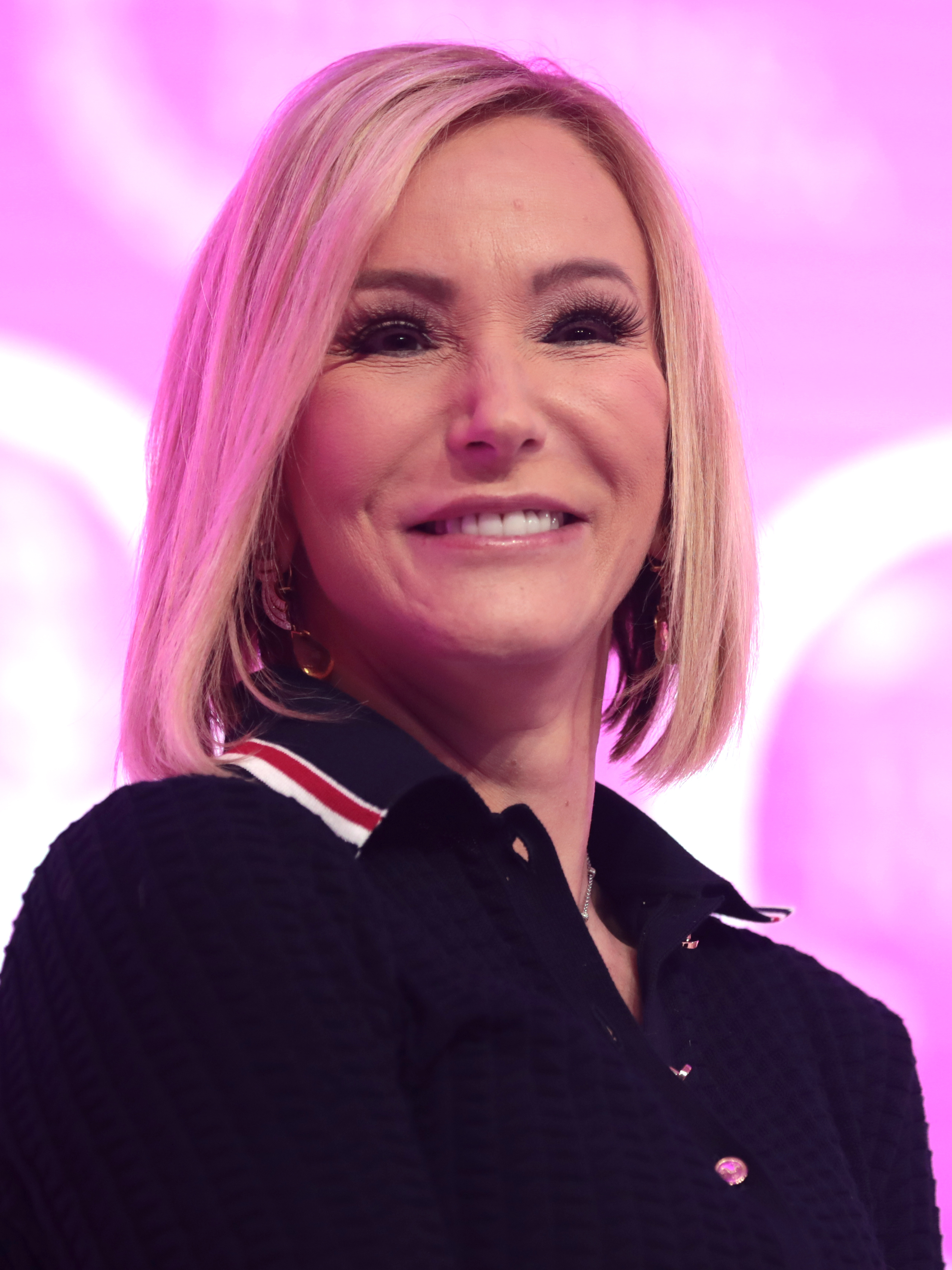
- White-Cain in 2021

Senior Advisor to the White House Faith Office
- Incumbent
- Assumed office February 7, 2025
- President: Donald Trump
- Preceded by: Melissa Rogers (Note: (Office of Faith-Based and Neighborhood Partnerships))

Special Advisor to the White House Office of Faith-Based and Neighborhood Partnerships
- In office May 3, 2018 – January 20, 2021
- President: Donald Trump
- Preceded by: Melissa Rogers
- Succeeded by: Melissa Rogers

Personal details
- Born: Paula Michelle Furr; April 20, 1966 (age 60) Tupelo, Mississippi, U.S.
- Party: Republican
- Spouses: Dean Knight (m. 1984; div. 1989); Randy White (m. 1990; div. 2007); Jonathan Cain (m. 2015)
- Children: 1
- Education: National Bible College and Seminary (attended)
- Website: Official website
- Movement: Charismatic: (Independent Network Charismatic Christianity; New Apostolic Reformation)

Ecclesiastical career
- Religion: Pentecostalism (1984–1991); Non-denominational (1991–present)
- Church: Church of God (1984–1991)
- Ordained: 1984
- Congregations: Without Walls International Church (1991–2011); New Destiny Christian Center (2011–2019); Paula White Ministries (2019–present)

Paula Michelle White-Cain (née Furr; born April 20, 1966) is an American pastor, author, spiritual advisor, and televangelist. She has written several books and is a leader in the charismatic movement. White is also known for her roles in Donald Trump's two presidential administrations.

White served as a pastor of Without Walls International Church in Tampa, Florida, a church she co-founded with her then-husband, Randy White, in 1991. From 2011 until May 2019, White was senior pastor of New Destiny Christian Center in Apopka, Florida.

White is a spiritual advisor to Donald Trump. She served as chair of the evangelical advisory board to Donald Trump's 2016 presidential campaign. White delivered the invocation at Trump's first inauguration on January 20, 2017, becoming the first female clergy member to deliver an inaugural invocation. In November 2019, Trump appointed White as a special advisor to the Faith and Opportunity Initiative at the Office of Public Liaison. On February 7, 2025, Trump announced the creation of the White House Faith Office, to be led by White.

== Early life ==
White was born Paula Michelle Furr in Tupelo, Mississippi, the daughter of Myra Joanelle and Donald Paul Furr III. Her parents owned a toy and craft store.

Donald and Myra Furr's marriage began to fail when White was five years old. White's mother left Tupelo and took her to Memphis; her separation from her husband and his subsequent suicide drove White, her brother, and her mother into poverty. White's mother became an alcoholic. While she worked, caregivers looked after her daughter. White has said that she was sexually and physically abused between the ages of six and thirteen by different people on different occasions. White has said that during that time, she suffered from bulimia.

White graduated from Seneca Valley High School in Germantown, Maryland.

While living in Maryland in 1984, White converted to Christianity at the Damascus Church of God. White later stated that she had received a vision from God shortly after her conversion.

== Career ==
=== Without Walls International Church ===
The Tampa Christian Center was founded in Tampa, Florida, by the then-married Paula and Randy White in 1991. The church struggled financially and could not afford to pay the Whites a salary for the first two years of its existence. From 1991 to 1998, the church changed locations three times. It was eventually renamed Without Walls International Church. While the church held services in an outdoor tent in 1999, it reported 5,000 attendees a week and 10,000 people ministered to outside the church by 230 outreach ministries.

In 2004, Without Walls International Church reported a congregation of 20,000, making it the largest congregation in the area and the seventh-largest church in the United States. An audit showed that Without Walls received $150 million from 2004 to 2006.

On July 12, 2009, White became the senior pastor of the church. She replaced her former husband, Randy White, who stated that he was stepping down as pastor for health reasons but would remain connected with the church in a different position.

On January 1, 2011, White became the senior pastor of the Without Walls Central Church in Lakeland, Florida and thus became the pastor of both locations of the church. In August 2011, services ceased at the Lakeland campus when electricity was disconnected after the church failed to pay over $50,000 in bills. In 2011, U.S. Senator Chuck Grassley issued a report outlining his committee's findings regarding Without Walls, but took no additional action.

On June 20, 2012, Randy White resumed leadership of the Tampa location.

Without Walls filed for bankruptcy in 2014. In a 2017 interview, White stated that she had already resigned from Without Walls at the time of the bankruptcy filing and had played no role in the bankruptcy.

=== New Destiny Christian Center ===
On December 31, 2011, the New Destiny Christian Center board in Apopka, Florida, announced it had appointed White to succeed Zachery Tims as its senior pastor. New Destiny Christian Center had been searching for a replacement since Tims's death in August 2011. Tims' ex-wife Riva filed a lawsuit against the board of directors but quickly dropped it, citing a hold harmless clause in her 2009 marital settlement agreement. During a service at New Destiny Christian Center, White made the following remarks to the congregation: "I'm not asking you to like me. I'm not asking you to love me or respect me, because I'll do the work to earn that. I always ask people to give me one year of your life, and I promise you will be changed."

On May 5, 2019, White announced that she was stepping down as senior pastor of New Destiny Christian Center and that her son and his wife would become the new senior pastors. The church would also be renamed City of Destiny.

=== Paula White Ministries ===
White recorded the first broadcast of Paula White Today in December 2001. By 2006, her show appeared on nine television networks, including Trinity Broadcast Network, Daystar, and Black Entertainment Television.

Ebony magazine said of White, "You know you're on to something new and significant when the most popular woman preacher on the Black Entertainment Network is a white woman."

White considers T. D. Jakes her spiritual father. Jakes invited her to speak at his 2000 "Woman Thou Art Loosed" conference. White also participated in the Mega Fest, hosted by Jakes in Atlanta, in 2004, 2005 and 2008.

White has ministered to Michael Jackson, Gary Sheffield, and Darryl Strawberry. In 2003, after Strawberry completed a prison sentence for cocaine possession, White became his personal pastor. Charisse Strawberry, Darryl's wife at the time, worked as an assistant to White, accompanying her on speaking engagements. White is the "personal life coach" of Tyra Banks and appeared on her show, the Tyra Banks Show, in an episode on promiscuity on October 4, 2006.

White's ministry began to take on modern-day prophetic aspects in the early 2010s that are common in Independent Charismatic Christianity. At that time, she called Independent Charismatic archbishop Nicholas Duncan-Williams her spiritual father. White has called herself an apostolic leader since 2012. She is a leader in the movement.

In March 2020, amid the COVID-19 pandemic, White said, "We are a hospital for those who are soul sick, those who are spiritually sick." After widespread criticism of an Arizona event scheduled for April 9, 2020, for which she had promised "supernatural protection" from COVID-19, White withdrew from the fundraiser.

=== Donald Trump ===
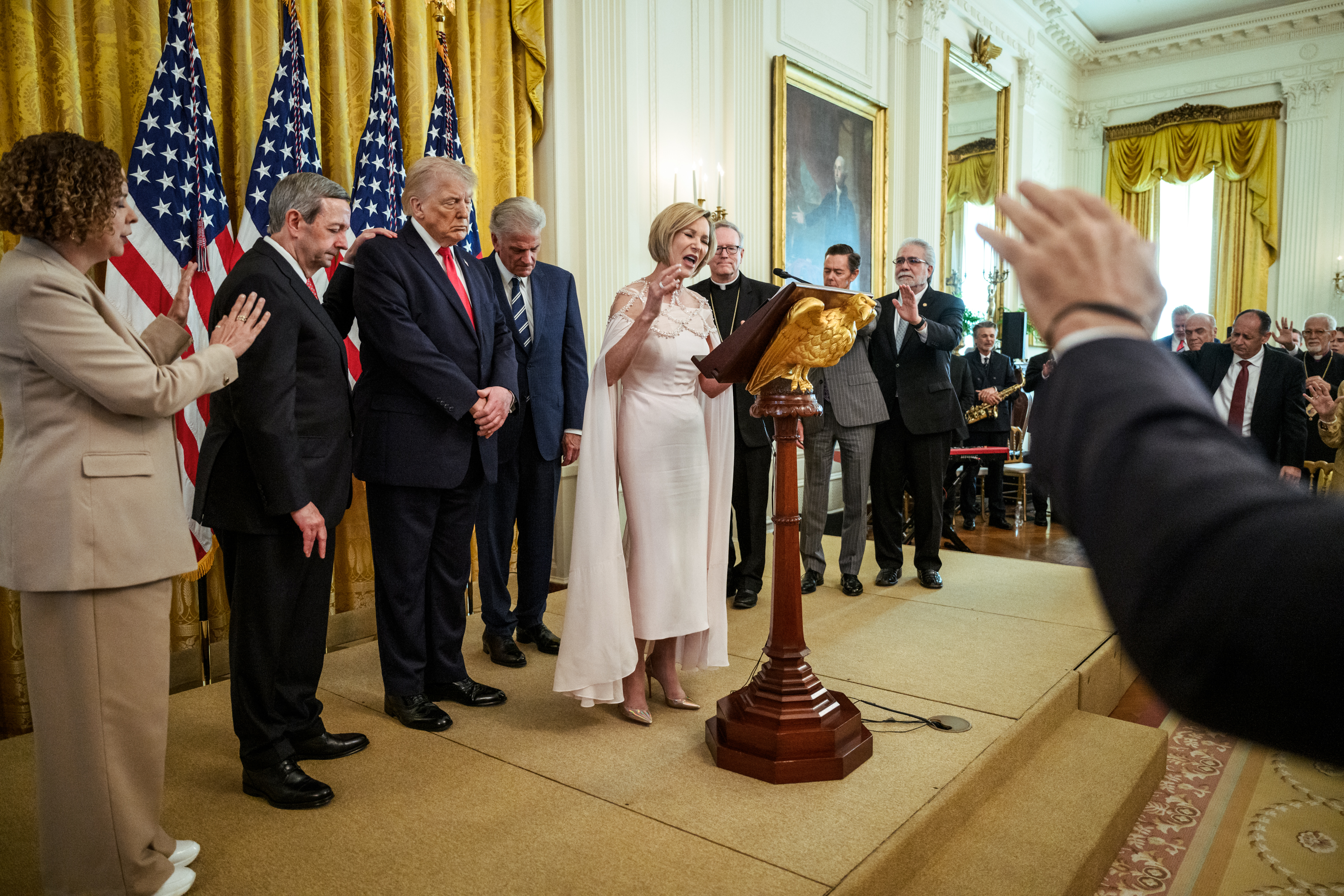
White in April 2026

White became a personal minister to Donald Trump after he watched her television show. White said he first contacted her by telephone in 2002. Trump brought White to Atlantic City on multiple occasions for private Bible studies and has appeared on her television show. In June 2016, White was credited by evangelical leader James Dobson with having converted Trump to Christianity. White was part of Trump's Evangelical Advisory Board during his 2016 campaign for president, and she provided the invocation prayer during Trump's inauguration ceremony. White is the first female clergy member to deliver an inaugural invocation.

Beginning in June 2016, White served as one of Trump's spiritual advisors. Following Trump's 2016 election, White held various prayer circles with him in the White House.

In 2019, Trump appointed White to an advisory role at the White House's Center for Faith and Opportunity Initiative.

White supported Trump in his 2020 reelection campaign, delivering a prayer at his June 2019 campaign launch event. White warned that "Christians that don't support President Trump will have to answer to God." One day after the election, when election results showed Trump was losing to Joe Biden, White appeared at a live-streamed prayer service in which she spoke in tongues and repeatedly called on "angelic reinforcement" from angels from Africa and South America to secure Trump's reelection. The clip went viral across the Internet, with some people expressing outrage at White.

On January 6, 2021, at the pro-Trump rally that preceded the attack on the U.S. Capitol, White offered an opening prayer before Trump's speech.

On February 6, 2025, shortly after his second inauguration, Trump announced the creation of a White House Faith Office with White as its leader. The appointment of White to lead the White House Faith Office drew criticism from some Christian leaders, conservative evangelicals, and conservative anchor Tucker Carlson.

In April 2026, at an Easter lunch event with Trump, White caused controversy when comparing Trump to Jesus Christ, saying: “Mr President, no one has paid the price like you have paid the price. It almost cost you your life. You were betrayed and arrested and falsely accused. It’s a familiar pattern that our lord and savior showed us”. White's statement was criticised as being blasphemous by a number of Christians, particularly as her statement was made during an event celebrating Easter.

== Political and theological views ==
White has been described as a Christian nationalist who has forged close political ties with Donald Trump. White was amongst the first prominent Independent Charismatic leaders to embrace the populism of Trump, coming to his side even before the 2016 Republican primaries; she helped rally support for Trump within evangelical circles. As Trump's spiritual advisor, White helped facilitate connections for Trump with key leaders within the New Apostolic Reformation. Her early support of Trump, along with that of other prominent evangelical leaders, helped make him a messiah among white Christian nationalists.

Unlike some other Christian nationalists associated with Trump, White has been described as valuing Christian identity over racial identity. She has surrounded herself with a racially diverse network of Independent Charismatic leaders from across the United States and the Global South, including prominent figures in African American, Latino, and African Pentecostal communities. Her early support for Trump is estimated to have caused her to lose 200-300 black members of her church and $10,000 in donations.

White is a proponent of prosperity theology.

White has been criticized for her religious beliefs by some theologians and conservative evangelists. Christian rapper Shai Linne criticized her in a song called "Fal$e Teacher$". In response to her critics, in 2017, White said, "I have been called a heretic, an apostate, an adulterer, a charlatan, and an addict. It has been falsely reported that I once filed for bankruptcy and that I deny the Trinity! My life and my decisions have been nowhere near perfect, though nothing like what has been falsely conveyed in recent days."

White enthusiastically supported Trump's 2017 decision to recognize Jerusalem as the capital of Israel.

In January 2020, White was criticized for a sermon in which she prayed for the miscarriage of "all Satanic pregnancies." White later wrote on Twitter that the comment had been a metaphor, and a reference to Ephesians 6:12. André Gagné, scholar of American evangelicalism and the New Apostolic Reformation, states White's "words were misinterpreted" given the context of her spiritual warfare prayer and the cryptic language used. Instead, he argues, the terminology refers to the destruction of evil schemes against Christians. Gagné has referred to White as "one of the most vocal advocates of spiritual warfare".

In December 2021, White participated in the "Prayer Rally for Peace on the Korean Peninsula," hosted by the Unification Church's Universal Peace Federation. During the event, she called Hak Ja Han Moon, the widow of Unification Church founder Sun Myung Moon, "a jewel from God" and lauded "Mother Moon for her great work as a spiritual leader who loves the Lord and seeks to carry out and to comfort the heart of God in all the areas of conflict in the world."

=== Immigration ===
In a July 2018 interview on the Christian Broadcasting Network, White criticized immigration advocates who cited the Gospel's account of Jesus migrating to Egypt, saying: "Yes, he did live in Egypt for three-and-a-half years. But it was not illegal. If he had broken the law, then he would have been sinful and he would not have been our Messiah."

White embraced Trump's immigration policy, including the detention of immigrant children, saying conditions at a border facility that she visited were not inhumane.

== Personal life ==
White married local musician Dean Knight in 1985; they divorced in 1989. They had one son, born in 1985.

White was married to Randy White from 1990 to 2007. They met while attending Damascus Church of God in Maryland, where Randy White was an associate pastor. They divorced their respective spouses and married each other. The couple moved to Tampa, Florida, and started Without Walls International Church in 1991.

In 2011, White stated publicly that she had once had a stroke and that she had become addicted to prescription medication following her stroke.

White married Jonathan Cain, member of the rock band Journey, in 2015.

== Bibliography ==
Books by Paula White include:

- He Loves Me He Loves Me Not: What Every Woman Needs to Know about Unconditional Love But Is Afraid to Feel, 2004
- Simple Suggestions for a Sensational Life, 2005
- Deal With It!: You Cannot Conquer What You Will Not Confront, 2006
- You're All That!, 2007
- Move On, Move Up: Turn Yesterday's Trials into Today's Triumphs, 2008
- The Ten Commandments of Health and Wellness, 2008
- Fasting Made Simple: Road Map, Results, and Rewards, 2008
- I Don't Get Wholeness... That's the Problem: Making Relationships Work, 2008
- Dare to Dream: Understand God's Design for Your Life, 2017
- Something Greater: Finding Triumph over Trials, 2019

== See also ==
- Seven Mountain Mandate
