= BSSM =

BSSM is a four-letter acronym that may refer to:

- Bishōjo Senshi Sailor Moon, the Japanese name for the Sailor Moon franchise
- Blood Sugar Sex Magik, an album by the Red Hot Chili Peppers
- Bethel School of Supernatural Ministry, a non-accredited school run by Bethel Church training its students in the supernatural and miracles
