= Revivalist (person) =

Person who holds, promotes, or presides over religious revivals

A revivalist or evangelist is a person who holds or presides over religious revivals. Revival services are an integral part of the Conservative Anabaptist, Free Will Baptist and Methodist traditions, among other branches of Christianity. Revivals are defined as "a period of heightened spiritual activity in a section of the church, brought about by a renewing and empowering work of the Holy Spirit, bringing a new sense of the presence of God, especially in his holiness, resulting in a deeper awareness of sin in the lives of believers, followed by new joy as sin is confessed and forgiven." Common jargon for these meetings or series of meetings can include "having a revival meeting" or "to hold a revival." The meetings and gatherings can last for days, several weeks, or for many years on rare occasions.

In the Conservative Anabaptist tradition, revivals are aimed at preaching the New Birth and calling backsliders to repentance. Methodist revivalists preach two works of grace, the (1) New Birth and (2) entire sanctification, along with encouraging backsliders to return to God.

A revivalist can also include someone that either presides over, or actively pursues, a religious re-awakening or restoration to spiritual ideas, orthodoxy, religious or personal experiences, and/or communal pursuit of divine occurrences. A secondary definition for revivalist is a person who revives customs, institutions, or ideas.

== History ==
Revivalists have been prominent in all major evolutions of the Christian church. In the First Great Awakening, Congregationalist minister Jonathan Edwards was credited with being the initial catalyst for this movement that would greatly impact American culture from 1734 to 1750. Methodist preacher George Whitefield also did much to see The Great Awakening's furtherance and influence on the American public.

The Second Great Awakening began at the end of the 18th century, and continued until the mid-nineteenth century. It was characterized by several prominent revivalists with differing denominational backgrounds and message focuses. Charles Finney is often cited as the most prominent preacher of the Second Great Awakening. He was known for both genders being present in his meetings, his extemporaneous preaching style, the use of the "nervous seat" (where those considering salvation could contemplate and pray), and the "altar call" (invitation at the end of a church service for an attendee to come forward for prayer). Finney held that revivals were not necessarily sovereign acts of God, but could be initiated by believers following Biblical precedents and prescriptions. Finney exclaimed, "A revival is not a miracle, not dependent on a miracle, in any sense. It is purely philosophical result of the right use of the constituted means." Presbyterian minister Lyman Beecher, another prominent Second Great Awakening preacher, was largely known for encouraging and expanding the temperance movement, which advocated for teetotalism.

== Revival, 1900–1950s ==
At the beginning of the 20th century, several revivals began across the United States, Europe, and eventually affected many parts of the world. In the early 1900s, Charles Parham was leading a school called Bethel in Topeka, Kansas. One of his students had an experience with glossolalia. He and his students became prominent proponents of the experience being indicative of the baptism of the Holy Spirit. William Seymour, a student of Charles Parham, was instrumental in the Azusa Street Revival in Los Angeles, California. The revival meetings held at Azusa Street were reported to include remarkable miracles, healings, and divine experiences.

The Azusa Street revival spread overseas, and particularly impacted Wales through Evan Roberts. The outpouring was termed the Welsh Revival and lasted from 1904 through 1905. Around the same time, John G. Lake was reported to have held several healing crusades in Africa, and began a healing ministry in Spokane, Washington. Throughout the international community, several other revivals were reported to have occurred during the first decade of the 20th century.

In the mid-20th century, several other revivalists became prominent in American culture. William Branham was the spearhead for several healing ministers emerging during the 1930s, 1940s, and early 1950s. Branham supported faith healing, and had testified to seeing visions before praying for the healing of his meeting attendees. Jack Coe was another healing evangelist reported to have numerous healings during his meetings, and a passionate preaching style. Oral Roberts and Billy Graham emerged during the late 1940s, and spread the revival influence and meetings further. Oral Roberts was considered a healing minister, whereas Billy Graham's crusades were characterized by large crowds and an emphasis on salvation.

== Contemporary revivalists ==
Conservative Anabaptist churches hold revivals lasting once a week each year. In the Conservative Anabaptist tradition (Beachy Amish, Conservative Mennonite, and Dunkard Brethren), revivals are aimed at preaching the New Birth and calling backsliders to repentance.

It is common for Methodist churches aligned with the holiness movement to hold a revival lasting approximately one week annually. Revivalists (evangelists) are called for this purpose by the local church. The Book of Discipline of the Allegheny Wesleyan Methodist Connection provides the following definition: "An evangelist is an elder or conference preacher devoted to traveling and preaching the gospel without any specific pastoral charge, authorized by the Connection to promote revivals and to spread the Gospel of Jesus Christ abroad in the land." Along with this, Methodist churches are usually associated with a camp meeting at which revivalists preach; these are held usually in the summertime. Methodist revivalists preach two works of grace, the (1) New Birth and (2) entire sanctification, along with encouraging backsliders to return to God.

Several prominent "revivalist" organizations and ministries have gained prominence in the last several decades. Reinhard Bonnke was a German evangelist who had a ministry impacting millions of African citizens at "crusades". He is recognized for his impassioned messages, his focus on salvation through Christ, and the redeeming and healing blood of Jesus Christ.

Heidi Baker and Rolland Baker have also gained international recognition for an exponentially expanding network of churches throughout the world. Their organization, Iris Ministries, has upwards of 10,000 connected churches partnered for revival. Iris Ministries is located in Mozambique, Africa.

John and Carol Arnott are ministers from Toronto, Canada. They, along with Randy Clark, were the foremost ministers in a charismatic move of God referred to as the Toronto Blessing. The Toronto blessing was divisive in the fact that holy laughter, being intoxicated in the Holy Spirit, and other charismatic manifestations were highly visible. The Toronto Blessing was also reported to have a primary focus on emotional and spiritual healing of father "wounds" or issues.

Bill Johnson is also a figurehead in the most recent wave of revival-focused activity within Christendom. Bill Johnson is the senior pastor of Bethel Church in Redding, California. He is an author, and his church has been highly influential in creating a theology that recognizes "God is good" and "God's healing is for today."

== Notable revivalists ==
- Albert Benjamin Simpson
- David Brainerd
- William Branham
- John Bunyan
- Jonathan Edwards
- Jonathan Goforth
- Kathryn Kuhlman
- John Knox
- John G. Lake
- Aimee Semple McPherson
- George Müller
- Watchman Nee
- Charles Parham
- William J. Seymour
- Sadhu Sundar Singh
- Charles Spurgeon
- A.W. Tozer
- John Wesley
- Smith Wigglesworth
- George Whitefield

== See also ==
- Christian revival
- Camp meeting
- Tent revival
