= The Passion Translation =

Modern paraphrase/translation of parts of the Bible

- Abbreviation: TPT
- Language: English
- OT published: 2029 (projected)
- NT published: 2011
- Authorship: Brian Simmons
- Translation type: paraphrase
- Publisher: BroadStreet Publishing Group
- Website: thepassiontranslation.com
- Genesis 1:1–3 When God created the heavens and the earth, the earth was completely formless and empty, with nothing but darkness draped over the deep. God's Spirit swept over the face of the waters. And then God announced: "Let there be light," and light burst forth. John 3:16 For here is the way God loved the world—he gave his only, unique Son as a gift. So now everyone who believes in him will never perish but experience everlasting life.

The Passion Translation (TPT) is a modern English rendering of the Bible which has garnered controversy. Its publisher describes it as a translation, while others consider it an interpretive paraphrase. As of early 2025, only the New Testament and portions of the Hebrew Bible had been completed; the entire TPT Bible is slated for completion in 2029.

The publisher names Brian Simmons as the lead translator. According to Simmons, he experienced a vision and then pursued a goal "to bring God's eternal truth into a highly readable heart-level expression that causes truth and love to jump out of the text and lodge inside our hearts." However, the absence of a disclosed committee for the translation, as is most common for Bible translations, has been noted. Various scholars have described the work as a solo effort, and criticized it as being unfaithful to the original manuscripts.

The work has received endorsements from some Christian leaders in the United States. However, it has also been subject to intensive scrutiny and criticism. Amid controversy, the TPT was removed in January 2022 from Bible Gateway, an online compendium of Bible translations. It remains available on the YouVersion and Logos Bible Software platforms.

Portions of the work were first published in 2011 by 5 Fold Media, while the current publisher, as of February 2025, is BroadStreet Publishing Group.

== History ==
=== Background ===
During a 2015 television interview, Brian Simmons asserted that in 2009 Jesus visited his room and commissioned him to write a new translation of the Bible. According to Simmons, the Passion Translation is named after "an angel named Passion", who aided him in the translation. According to the publisher's website, Simmons's vision for the project is that people would read it and grow closer to Jesus.

Simmons claims to have assisted as a translator in the New Tribes Mission to the Paya-Kuna in collaboration with Wycliffe Bible Translators. A representative from Wycliffe has since stated that Simmons was never a translator. He only assisted in reading the translation to the native people, and providing feedback to the translators of how well the translation was understood by the intended audience.

=== Release ===
The Passion Translation is primarily the work of Simmons. He states that his "work has been theologically reviewed by professionals", listing a group of people.

The New Testament was published on October 31, 2017.

=== 2022 removal from Bible Gateway ===
In January 2022, Bible-reading website Bible Gateway removed TPT from their list of translations. Simmons criticized the action in a since-deleted Facebook post, saying "cancel culture is alive in the church world" and asking followers to request the site restore the version. Broadstreet Publishing, however, said in a statement that it "accepts that Bible Gateway has the right to make decisions as they see fit with the platforms they manage". As of November 2023, the website has not given Broadstreet Publishing a reason for the removal.

== Critical reception ==
The Passion Translation (TPT) has received many critical reviews but also some endorsements. As of February 2025, the publisher, BroadStreet Publishing Group, included an endorsement for the work from Bill Johnson of Bethel Church. Lou Engle of TheCall and Bobbie Houston have also endorsed the TPT.

=== Inaccuracies ===
In a 14-point critique, Andrew Wilson, a Cambridge and King's College trained historian and theologian who serving in 2025 as a Teaching Pastor at King's Church London, and other commentators (Note: New Apostolic Reformation critic Holly Pivec in particular notes that Simmons "claims that every book and footnote is evaluated by respected scholars and editors. But—curiously—he has not publicly revealed the names of any of those scholars and editors." See Pivec, "Important facts...", op. cit.) point out that TPT was done as a "solo attempt" lacking the usual scholarly translation committee, and as such, is "not really a translation" and is inaccurate to the original language source texts. Specifically, he points to the Greek of Galatians 2:19, hina theō zēsō, which is often translated as "that I might live for God", which TPT presents as "so that I can live for God in heaven's freedom [emphasis added by Wilson]". This commentator continues,

To be clear: there is no indication whatsoever in the Greek of that sentence, or the rest of the chapter, that either heaven or its freedom are in view in this text.

Elements like this in the TPT are "not... translation. It's an interpolation, or a gloss, or (more bluntly) an addition," Wilson wrote. "I don't want to play the Revelation 22 card (Note: Revelation 22:18 (KJV): If any man shall add unto these things, God shall add unto him the plagues that are written in this book.) but Christians really shouldn't do this." He concludes,

Brian Simmons is a brother, and one who has put in a huge amount of work on something very close to his heart. But the result, for a variety of reasons, is not good. I wouldn’t recommend people use TPT, and if they do, I would recommend they recognise that a) it is not actually a translation, and b) they use other versions as their primary texts for study.

Andrew G. Shead, who at the time of his writing was head of Old Testament and Hebrew at Moore Theological College in Sydney, Australia, and a member of the New International Version Committee on Bible Translation, reviewing the release of Simmons's version of the biblical Psalms, concludes that the TPT is no longer the Bible.

Brian Simmons has made a new translation of the Psalms (and... the whole New Testament) which aims to 're-introduce the passion and fire of the Bible to the English reader.' He achieves this by abandoning all interest in textual accuracy, playing fast and loose with the original languages, and inserting so much new material into the text that it is at least 50% longer than the original. The result is a strongly sectarian translation that no longer counts as Scripture... If the translation had been packaged as a commentary on Scripture I would not have needed to write this review; but to package it as Scripture is an offence against God. Every believer who is taught to treat it as the enscripturated words of God is in spiritual danger, not least because of the sentimentalised portrait of God that TPT Psalms sets out to paint. Simmons's caricature of God as 'the King who likes and enjoys you' [citing p. 5 of The Psalms: Poetry on Fire] eliminates all but one facet of God's feelings about us, and then gets that one wrong.

=== Plagiarism ===
In 2026, pastors David Fish and JonMark Baker, along with apologist Mike Winger, alleged more than 100 instances of plagiarism in TPT – in which phrases or sentences are identical to other unique translations without credit being given – along with more than 2,400 additional likely instances.

=== Ongoing changes ===
Simmons has continued editing the online version of TPT in the years since its initial publication, which is not uncommon for certain Biblical translations, but the changes are "often extensive" and "without announcement," as Christianity Today noted in a 2026 critique.

In 2013, for instance, TPT translated Galatians 6:6 as “And those who are taught the Word will receive an impartation from their teacher; a transference of anointing takes place between them.” In 2020, the same verse was rendered “And those who are taught the Word must share all good things with their teacher.” Simmons appears to be making these changes largely unilaterally.

While the TPT website claims that there is a team providing oversight to edits, one of the experts listed online as a theological reviewer of the work, Rick Wadholm Jr., told The Roys Report that there is not any actual "rigorous review" and that he is unsure if any of his "very many comments/edits/revisions were accepted or followed in any fashion” by Simmons.
