= Bethel Church (Redding) =

Coordinates: 40°36′35″N 122°21′30″W

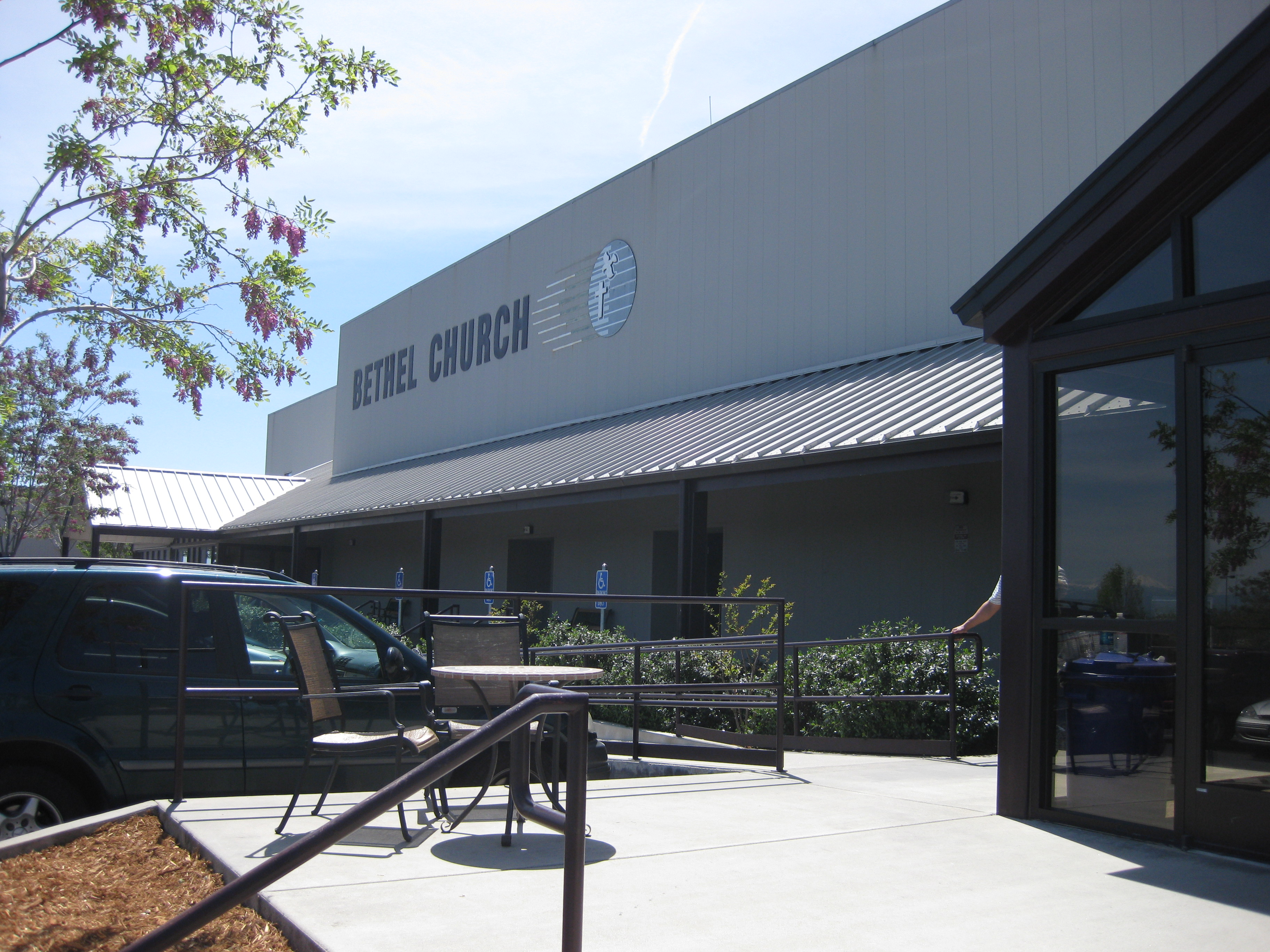
- Bethel Church
- Location: Redding, California
- Country: United States
- Denomination: Nondenominational, charismatic, Pentecostal, Independent Network Charismatic Christianity, New Apostolic Reformation
- Previous denomination: Assemblies of God
- Website: www.bethel.com

History
- Founded: 1952

Clergy
- Pastors: Kris Vallotton; Dann Farrelly; Danny Silk

Bethel Church is a non-denominational American megachurch with 9,000 members in Redding, California, part of the neo-charismatic movement and known for its controversial teachings and practices. The church was established in 1952 and between 1954–2006 was affiliated with the Assemblies of God; it is currently led by Bill Johnson with a weekly congregation in excess of 8,000 people.

Bethel identifies with charismatic practices such as faith healing, prophecy, and raising the dead, with church services frequently including behaviors and experiences interpreted by participants as manifestations of the Holy Spirit. Bethel has its own music labels, Bethel Music and Jesus Culture ministries, which have gained popularity for contemporary worship music. The church runs the Bethel School of Supernatural Ministry with over 2,000 students annually.

Bethel and its leaders have received extensive media coverage, both praising their influence and criticizing their unconventional beliefs and practices (including supernatural claims such as "grave soaking"), and their intersection with politics. It has also been criticized for multiple incidents of clergy sexual abuse and "cover-up culture". Politically, Bethel leaders have publicly supported conservative causes, including Donald Trump, conversion therapy, through sermons, social media, and advocacy. Former worship leader Sean Feucht ran for the United States Congress on a socially conservative platform. The church has faced scrutiny over its civic and political influence on Redding, practices that have been considered manifestations of the Seven Mountain Mandate.

== History ==
=== Early history and transition to non-denominationalism ===
Robert Doherty founded the church in 1952, initially as a house church. In 1954, the congregation moved to a new location at Magnolia Avenue and became an affiliate of the Assemblies of God. M. Earl and Darliene Johnson were appointed pastors of Bethel Church in 1968.

In 1984, Raymond Larson became the senior pastor, and during his 11-year tenure, Bethel Church grew to over 2,200 members. This dramatic growth led to the purchase and construction of a new 71-acre (29 ha) facility with more than 46,000 square feet (4,300 m^{2}) of space in the new church building.

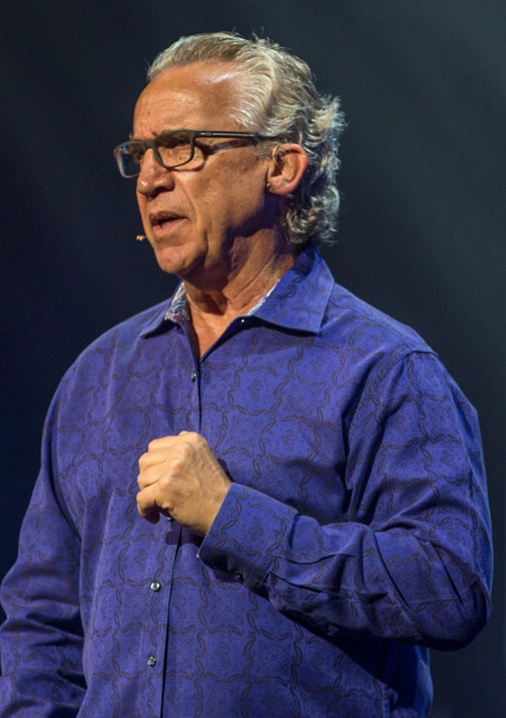
Bill Johnson has been the leader of Bethel Church since 1996

In February 1996, Bill Johnson – then a pastor in Weaverville and the son of former Bethel pastor Earl Johnson – was invited to lead the church. Johnson later wrote that he accepted "on a nonnegotiable condition – that his focus would always be the pursuit of revival," and one account says "the leaders unanimously agreed."

Johnson has written that during a 1995 visit to revival meetings associated with the Toronto Blessing he committed to make "the outpouring of the Holy Spirit" the focus of his ministry, a revival emphasis he brought to Bethel after becoming senior pastor in 1996. Attendance initially declined – Johnson later said "we lost 1,000 people" when the revival emphasis began – but subsequent reporting documented substantial growth, including an average weekly attendance of 8,684 by 2016.

In November 2005, the membership of Bethel Church voted unanimously to withdraw the church's affiliation with the Assemblies of God and become a non-denominational church; however, under Assemblies of God bylaws the church first needed to invite the District leadership to address the congregation.

On January 15, 2006, Bethel's membership voted to rescind the withdrawal and invited the district leadership to Redding. The district leadership met with the congregation on January 17, but the result was a near-unanimous vote to withdraw. In a letter, Johnson points out that this action was "not a reaction to conflict but a response to a call … we feel called to create a network that helps other networks thrive – to be one of many ongoing catalysts in this continuing revival. Our call feels unique enough theologically and practically from the call on the Assemblies of God that this change is appropriate."

As of 2016, Bethel Church had 8,684 attendees a week. In 2018, as per its annual report, Bethel had 11,233 people that called "Bethel Redding home". In 2026 the congregation size was listed as 8,873. In 2025.

=== October 2015 Colorado Springs shooting ===
On October 31, 2015, a shooting took place near downtown Colorado Springs, Colorado in which three victims and the shooter, Noah Harpham, died. Days before the shooting, Harpham published a blog titled "Is my dad in a cult? Even worse, is it satanic?" in which he questioned his father's involvement with Bethel Church and its pastor Bill Johnson, whom he accused of being a satanist trying to control the minds of his followers.

Three days after the shooting, Bethel Church issued a press release in which they called the shooter's father Thomas Harpham "a valued and loved part of Bethel Church," adding that he had attended the Bethel School of Supernatural Ministry for three years and interned with the church as a third-year student. According to the statement, some members of the Bethel team had met Noah Harpham but had no recollection if he ever attended the church.

=== COVID-19 pandemic ===
In 2020, during the coronavirus pandemic, Bethel Church closed the healing rooms and moved healing operations of 700 people online. The church also suspended faith healings at hospitals. The church's official position was to follow the recommendations of health officials, and that "wisdom, modern medicine, and faith are meant to work together", but the church simultaneously upheld belief in God's ability to heal supernaturally. Some in the church community held differing views. Kevin Dedmon, a longtime teacher of the Bethel School of Supernatural Ministry stated that "there is no way this thing can live in the presence of God", and "we declare no fear and we declare healing in Jesus' name." Later in the year, Chuck Parry, the director of Bethel's healing rooms claimed that numerous people were healed from COVID-19 through the church's remote Zoom calls, alongside other claimed miracles, such as healing cancer, blindness, and waking people up from comas. By October 2020, Shasta County had the highest COVID-19 case rate in California and Bethel School of Supernatural Ministry in Redding asked its entire 1,600-person student body to self-quarantine as the number of coronavirus cases among students and staff rose to 137 since classes started a month previously.

In October 2020, Bethel's senior leader Beni Johnson was criticized after posting a video in which she mocked wearing masks while shopping on the California coast, saying "If you'll do the scientific research, these masks are worthless and they're people's security blankets. We won't be shopping and giving them any money because you have to wear a stupid freaking mask that doesn't work". When asked about the video, Shasta Community Health Center CEO Dean Germano said it was disconcerting to see leaders disavowing masks. Beni Johnson later apologized for "the insensitivity and making light of this pandemic" while maintaining that she still questions the importance of a mask, but that she wears one when the situation requires it.

== Beliefs and practices ==
=== Focus on miracles ===
Bethel Church emphasizes the belief that miracles described in the Bible continue to occur today and can be performed by believers. These include faith healing, prophecy, raising the dead, speaking in tongues, casting out demons, and regeneration of limbs and girls' hymens. Church services may involve behaviors such as uncontrollable laughter, falling to the floor, shaking, screaming, and dancing – described by leaders as manifestations of the Holy Spirit. Leaders claim to have witnessed supernatural occurrences, such as appearances of angels and unexplained physical phenomena, including what they describe as "balls of electricity" and "glory clouds" – glitter-like particles seen falling from the ceiling during worship services. Videos of these events have been shared by the church on its official YouTube channel.

Bethel has produced theological materials expanding on its views of the supernatural. One such publication, The Physics of Heaven, co-authored by leaders associated with the church, explores connections between charismatic Christianity and concepts sometimes associated with New Age spirituality. Critics such as Gary Hal Graff have argued that the book departs from orthodox Christian doctrine. Co-author Kris Vallotton has described the book as "a foretaste of things to come," and another contributor wrote, "It wasn't that I wanted to become a New Ager. I just wanted to find out if maybe they had discovered some truths the churches hadn't."

==== Resurrection prayer campaign ====
In December 2019, Bethel Church launched a global prayer campaign seeking the resurrection of Olive Heiligenthal, the two-year-old daughter of Bethel Music artist and worship leader Kalley Heiligenthal, after she was pronounced dead. The campaign attracted widespread attention on social media and from national news outlets. During this period, a GoFundMe page was created, raising over $74,500 by January 2020. The prayer efforts concluded six days after Olive's death, when the church released a statement announcing that the family would transition toward planning a memorial service. The campaign drew criticism from some religious scholars and journalists, who argued that it encouraged unrealistic expectations of divine intervention in matters of life and death.

=== Theological classification ===
Bethel describes its senior leadership as an "apostolic" team. Sociologists Brad Christerson (Biola University) and Richard Flory (University of Southern California) identify Bethel and Bill Johnson as prominent examples of Independent Network Charismatic Christianity, a loose set of networks that often overlaps with what reporters and critics call the New Apostolic Reformation (NAR). Scholars and journalists have described these networks as promoting "dominionist" teachings; particularly the Seven Mountains Mandate, which urges Christians to "take dominion" over seven spheres of society: religion, family, education, government, media, arts and entertainment, and business. Johnson co-authored a book advancing this teaching. Johnson has denied formal ties to the NAR label, telling Christianity Today he is "not completely clear on what it is."

Ministers at Bethel produced a number of publications about religion and business (e.g. Money and the Prosperous Soul: Tipping the Scales of Favor and Blessing by Stephen K. De Silva). Bethel's teachings have been described as aligning with prosperity gospel - the belief that God rewards faith with wealth.

The church endorses Brian Simmons' The Passion Translation of the Bible, which Bill Johnson describes as “One of the greatest things to happen with Bible translation in my lifetime.” Multiple scholars have described it as a solo effort and an interpretive paraphrase rather than translation. They have criticized it as being unfaithful to the original manuscripts and lacking a disclosed committee for the translation.

=== Characterization as a cult ===
Bethel Church has been characterized as a cult by some former members, Redding residents, and Christian critics, including Costi Hinn, a former proponent of prosperity gospel and nephew of televangelist Benny Hinn. Such criticisms date back to at least 2012 when Bethel senior leader Kris Vallotton addressed the accusations that the church is a cult in an article for Charisma magazine. Researchers Holly Pivec and R. Douglas Geivett have identified a number of cult-like practices, such as love bombing, discouraging criticism of leaders through what Bethel calls a "culture of honor," extreme deference toward church leaders (e.g. expecting students to stand and applaud for the instructors every day before classes), encouraging the use of familial titles such as "Papa Bill" for Bill Johnson and "Papa Kris" for Kris Vallotton, and pressure on members to participate in Bethel programs. Pivec and Geivett also discuss an account in which a member was given a prophecy that a previously healed illness would return if she did not attend the Bethel School of Supernatural Ministry.

=== Affiliations and networks ===
Religious media outlets have described Bethel as part of broader charismatic-revivalist networks in which leaders, worship collectives, and ministries frequently collaborate while remaining organizationally independent. In the worship-music space, Jesus Culture – originally formed from Bethel's youth ministry – later became a separate organization and church; trade press routinely notes its Redding origins.

==== Shared conference networks ====
===== Event collaborations =====
At The Send (Orlando, 2019) – a collaborative evangelistic rally – lineups included Bethel senior leader Bill Johnson and worship teams associated with Bethel and Jesus Culture; mainstream evangelical press placed attendance around 60,000. Separately, Bethel has co-hosted healing conferences in Redding with Global Awakening (Randy Clark), including the multi-day "School of Healing & Impartation."

===== Leadership networks =====
Bethel's primary formal network is the Bethel Leaders Network (BLN), which connects pastors and ministry leaders for training and relationship; BLN replaced or consolidated earlier networking efforts such as Global Legacy.

== Church ministries ==
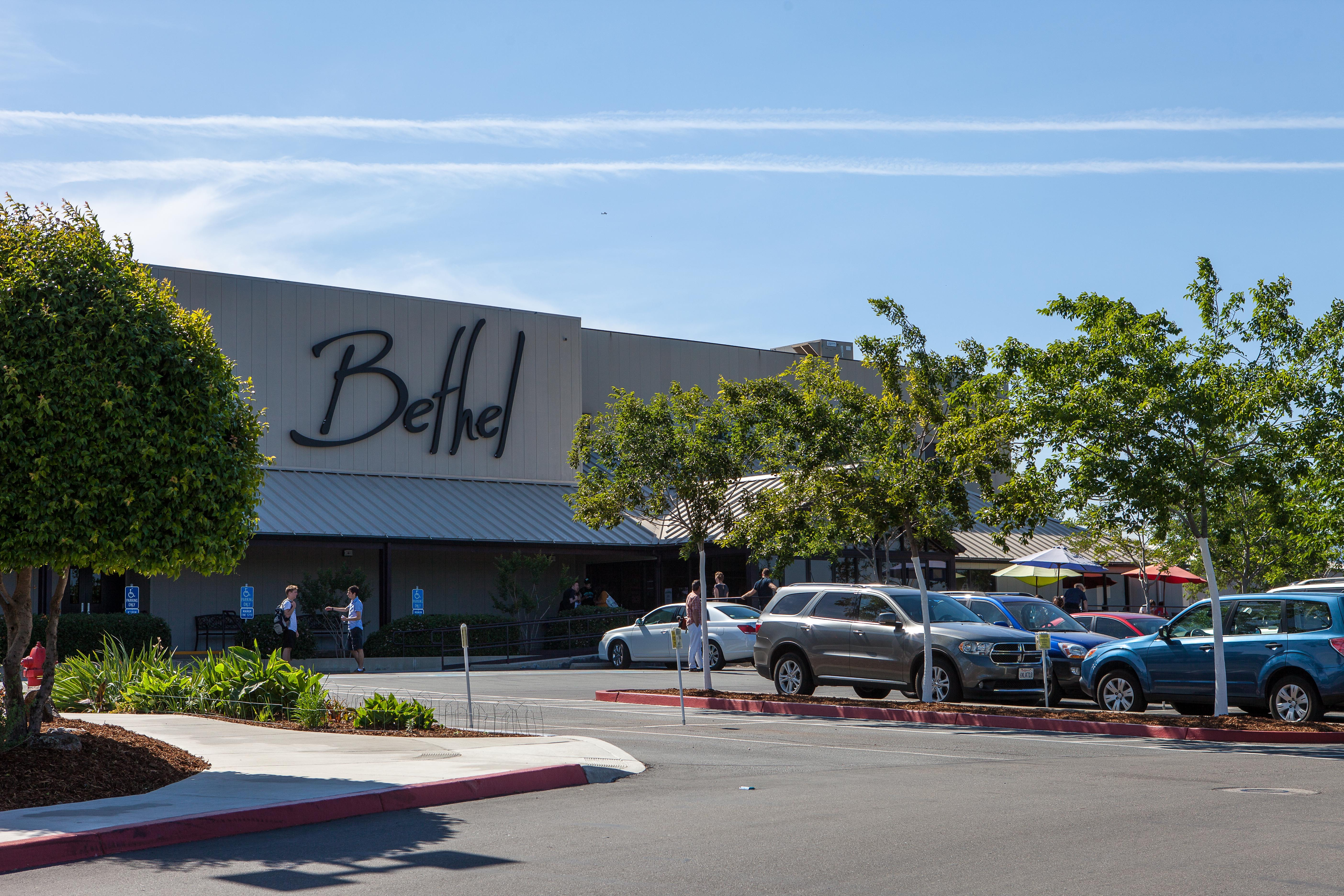
College View is Bethel Redding's larger campus. Weekend services and conferences are held in the main sanctuary. This campus is home to Bethel Healing Rooms, administrative offices, prayer chapel, HeBrews Coffee Shop and Bethel Bookstore.

Bethel Church has set up ministries in conjunction with the needs of its growing congregation within Redding, California. These ministries span a range of different sections for public service, internal structure, and even products and brands. One of the more well known of these ministries is Bethel Music due to the popularity of its music domestically and worldwide.

=== Bethel School of Supernatural Ministry ===
In the fall of 1998, Bethel Church began Bethel School of Supernatural Ministry, under the direction of Kris Vallotton, Bethel's senior associate pastor. The school trains its students in the supernatural and miracles, such as faith healing, in order that they may become revivalists. The normal program is one academic year and students have the opportunity to return for a second and third year. Approximately 15% of the students stay for the full three years. The school was founded with 36 students, and has grown to more than 2,400 students from over 70 countries in 2019. They are an unaccredited program and do not offer a degree or credits but a certificate. The school has gotten the nickname "Christian Hogwarts" among students because of its focus on the supernatural.

As of 2026, BSSM has more than 17,000 alumni. In 2016–17, an extensive survey on alumni was carried out by Eido Research by alumni of the program. From a representative sample from all years of graduation since 1999, the survey found that 97% of graduates are still "confident in their faith", and that 90% attend a church service at least monthly. Likewise, graduates reported seeing at least 35,000 salvations since 1999, and 50,000 physical healings over the previous year. The report also showed that BSSM graduates have a divorce rate that is four times lower than the American Christian average.

==== Student activities in Redding ====
As a part of the student's education, they get assignments, such as to find strangers in Redding to encourage and pray for. News articles report that students seek out people in wheelchairs and crutches to pray for in grocery stores and parking lots. Reportedly, the students are banned from prophesying to tourists around the Sundial Bridge after incidents and they have similarly been kicked out of local stores. Another regular practice is "treasure hunts", where they believe God gives them clues that lead them to people they are to find and encourage, pray for, or prophesy to.

==== 2008 lawsuit over attempted faith healing ====
In 2008, a man fell down a 200-foot (61 m) cliff in Redding after drinking with a group at the top. The two others that were with him, including one student at the Bethel School of Supernatural Ministry, believed he was dead and tried to find him for six hours in order to raise him back to life, rather than calling 9-1-1. The man survived, but was paralyzed from the fall, and later unsuccessfully sued the student in the group. The incident is often brought up as a criticism of the church's teachings, which includes that believers may raise people from the dead with prayer.

==== Grave soaking ====
The school garnered criticism for a practice among some students termed "grave soaking" or "grave sucking", where they would lie on the graves of deceased revivalists in the belief that they would absorb the deceased's anointing from God. The school would visit such graves for inspiration and prayer, and there the practice developed among students from an interpretation of the Biblical story of the prophet Elisha. In the Bible, a dead man was put in the grave of Elisha, and when the man's corpse touched the dead bones of Elisha, he was revived. This was interpreted to mean that the same power, or anointing, laid in the graves of later revivalists, and thus the students sought it by lying on their graves. The leadership of the church never endorsed the practice but did not immediately shut it down. In an interview, one of its leaders, Banning Liebscher, stated that Bill Johnson and the rest of the leadership responded in this way because Johnson "doesn't want to shut down those that are really seeking and those that are really trying to press in for more of God". At the same time, Liebscher said it was possible that revivalists' graves had the same anointing, but called the practice "weird". He further stated that he believed the criticism the church got over this, and other practices such as students attempting to walk through walls, actually stemmed from disagreements on charismatic theology.

Some critics allege that Bethel leaders, including senior pastor Beni Johnson, have in fact practiced and promoted grave soaking. Beni Johnson posted photos to Twitter and Instagram of herself lying on or hugging the graves of Christians such as C. S. Lewis. The posts were later removed. Among these critics are The Gospel Coalition and Baptist apologetics blog Pulpit & Pen.

=== Bethel Music ===
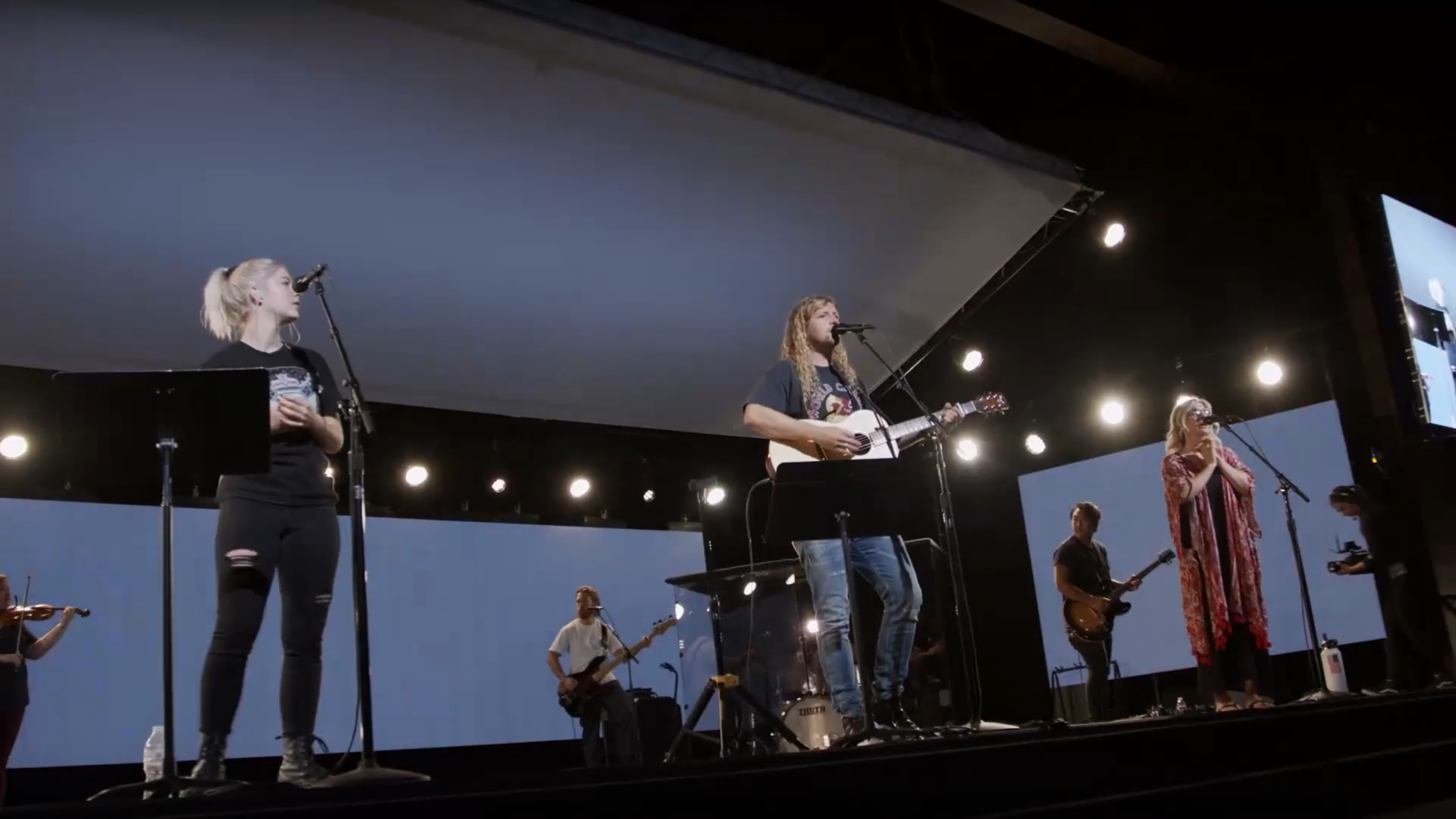
A worship service at Bethel Church

Bethel Music is an American record label and publishing company associated with Bethel Church, led by Bill Johnson's son Brian Johnson. Its music was among the most played contemporary worship music in American churches in 2019, and its albums have appeared on the Billboard 200 multiple times. Bethel Music has many songs with tens of millions of views on YouTube, and three with over 100 million views as of 2023 (Reckless Love, No Longer Slaves, Way Maker). The live performances of its songs are characterized by extended duration with much repetition and emotion.

==== Bethel Music and Jesus Image ====
Former Bethel Music worship leaders such as Steffany Gretzinger and Jeremy Riddle are prominently featured in Jesus Image's live projects, reflecting collaboration in recording and live events. Both Bethel and Jesus Culture led worship at the Azusa Now stadium gathering in Los Angeles in 2016, which drew tens of thousands, according to industry and news outlets. Bethel leaders have also appeared periodically at Jesus Image conferences and services (e.g., Jesus '16 panel; recurring schedule listings). Jesus Image leaders have likewise appeared at Bethel Church services in Redding; for example, Michael Koulianos (founder of Jesus Image) has preached at Bethel, with services published by Bethel's media channels.

==== Outing of William Matthews by Bethel's pastors ====
William Matthews is an American Christian musician who later came out as gay. Previously on staff at International House of Prayer, he relocated in 2009 to Redding, California at the request of Kim Walker-Smith, where he met Brian and Jenn Johnson. Matthews joined staff and remained a member of Bethel Church for 8 years. In November 2016, Bethel Music released a statement communicating, "As of June 13, 2016, Bethel Music and William Matthews have agreed that William will no longer be affiliated with Bethel Music, and William will no longer be in leadership within any of the worship communities at Bethel Church." In 2026, Matthews revealed that his 2016 departure followed an incident in which he was "publicly outed on a stage by Christian leaders cosplaying as my pastors."

=== CHANGED Movement ===
The CHANGED Movement was started by Bethel pastors Elizabeth Woning and Ken Williams in 2019 for people who "once identified as LGBTQ+" and is led by the "Equipped to Love" ministry at Bethel. Both Woning and Williams claim that before becoming Christians they identified as lesbian and gay, respectively.

While Bethel does not financially support the CHANGED Movement, it does pay the salaries of Woning and Williams. Bethel also promotes the group and houses the group's offices with another of Bethel's ministries. In August 2019, the group received attention when Bethel promoted CHANGED through a series of Instagram posts. The promotion was criticized by The Trevor Project and Q Christian Fellowship, among others. In response to the criticism, Bethel Church stated, "The message of CHANGED has never been 'All Must Change'". Bethel also stated, "For those of you who feel fulfilled and happy as you are, we love you!"

CHANGED uses the term, "once gay"; it has been noted by critics that the label is similar to "ex-gay", an anti-gay and lesbian movement that started in the 1970s. Other noted slogan similarities are CHANGED's use of, "Changed Is Possible"; the now-defunct ex-gay group Exodus International publicized their slogan as "Change is possible". While CHANGED does not promote use of the term, "conversion therapy", both CHANGED leaders Woning and Williams have gone on record as being against legislation that would restrict or ban conversion therapy, including the Equality Act.

In June 2021, CHANGED participated in "Freedom March in Washington, D.C.", promoting it as an event for "formerly LGBT-identifying people who share testimonies of how Jesus transformed their lives". The event had an attendance of about 200 people. While in Washington, D.C., leaders from CHANGED spoke with members of Congress, as well as Congressional staffers, about their concerns over the Equality Act.

== Allegations and investigations ==
=== Sexual abuse, grooming, and data mining ===
Bethel Church has faced criticism for its past endorsements and relationships with ministers who faced allegations of misconduct, including Shawn Bolz, Mike Bickle, Todd Bentley, Bob Hartley and Ben Armstrong. It has been criticized for "cover-up culture" and "culture of unsanctified mercy". There have been calls for the leadership to step down and compensate the victims.

==== Shawn Bolz ====
Shawn Bolz worked as a prophetic minister and book author having been endorsed and promoted by Bethel Church. Senior members of Bethel Church praised him in his 2015 book Translating God, including senior pastor Beni Johnson who called him "a personal friend" and "one of the premier voices in prophetic ministry today" and senior pastor Eric Johnson who wrote that "it is an honor to know Shawn and see the acceleration of grace and maturity in his ministry". Bolz spoke at Bethel services and Bethel School of Supernatural Ministry attracting media attention for his highly accurate prophecies, including knowing home addresses, pets and family members' names of people whom he had not met previously.

In January 2026 allegations against Shawn Bolz, including sexual harassment and data mining to fabricate prophecies (hot reading), were widely publicised in the media following an investigation by Mike Winger, an American evangelical theologian and apologist. Winger claimed that although Bethel Church's leadership had been aware of Bolz's misconduct for years they refused to release a statement or formally retract their endorsements. He presented evidence that Bolz obtained his prophetic "words of wisdom" through data mining social media profiles and address websites. Winger shared witness accounts that Bolz would usually be naked in shared hotel rooms, would masturbate in front of his male colleagues and boast about his penis size. According to his investigation, Bolz's victims suffered from PTSD and suicidal ideation as a result. Following Winger's exposé, Shawn Bolz announced a sabbatical from his ministry.

==== Ben Armstrong and Danny Silk ====
In 2008–2009, an intern named Sarah worked under Bethel Church's youth pastor and prophet, Ben Armstrong, and was invited to live with his family, an arrangement she later characterized as grooming. Sarah alleged that she was sexually assaulted by Armstrong on two occasions. The first incident reportedly occurred during a trip when she discovered they had been booked into a single room together. The second incident allegedly took place at Armstrong's home after she was asked to help with his children; upon arrival, she found the children were not there, and Armstrong reportedly invited her to stay and drink alcohol. Sarah alleged that she was sexually assaulted after becoming intoxicated. According to Sarah, Armstrong subsequently persuaded her not to report the incidents and asked another pastor to pray for her, stating that she was "having a bad day."

Armstrong later disclosed the interactions to Bethel's leadership, characterizing the relationship as a consensual affair. Senior pastor Danny Silk initiated a "restoration process" for Armstrong and publicly commended him for his confession. Under this process, Armstrong was required to repent and was suspended from preaching for several months before being allowed to resume his ministry. Armstrong and his wife later discussed the infidelity and the restoration process in various podcasts and sermons at Bethel.

In 2019, Silk published Unpunishable: Ending Our Love Affair with Punishment, a book which advocated for a model of repentance and restoration over punitive measures for leadership misconduct. The book included an account of the situation involving Armstrong and Sarah. Following its publication, Sarah stated that her story had been included without her permission and objected to it being framed as a consensual affair. She credited Mike Winger's exposé about sexual abuse at Bethel for giving her the courage to come forward.

In January 2026, Rozanne Leigh claimed that Armstrong had groomed and inappropriately touched her around the same time that he engaged in inappropriate behaviour with Sarah.

==== Bethel's response ====
In January 2026 Bethel Church released a statement admitting that they knew about the allegations of Bolz's sexual misconduct made seven years prior but failed to respond as they should have and that "our hearts are grieved, and embarrassed". Redding Police stated that they had changed computer systems and had no way to see if anyone lodged a complaint against Bolz.

Statements released by Bethel in February 2026 indicated that they had become aware of an accusation involving Ben Armstrong and a former BSSM student and that the incident "would've taken place prior to a known moral failure in 2009, for which Ben publicly repented, was removed from ministry, and walked through a multi-year healing and restoration process" and that Bethel "deeply value their [Armstrong and his wife's] ministry with us". A later statement clarified that "in light of these new and previously unknown allegations" Armstrong would be placed on administrative leave and emphasized that this is "not a verdict". In April an additional statement from Bethel confirmed that Sintra Group Investigations were tasked with leading an independent investigation into allegations against Armstrong.

In May 2026 Bethel Church released a statement confirming that they no longer platform Shawn Bolz, Todd Bentley, Mike Bickle and Bob Hartley. They pledged their commitment to "showing real change through our actions, lasting cultural shifts" and increasing the role and authority of its board of elders. They confirmed that senior leaders Bill Johnson, Kris Vallotton, Kathy Vallotton and Dann Farrelly would remain in their ministry roles and that the church had engaged external leadership consultants.

=== Ponzi scheme scandals ===
In 2020, Bethel Church was linked to a federal fraud investigation involving its attendee Matthew Piercey and his associate Kenneth Winton, who were accused by U.S. authorities of operating a Ponzi scheme that defrauded investors of approximately $35 million between 2015 and 2020. Prosecutors alleged that Piercey used his investment companies, Family Wealth Legacy and Zolla, to solicit funds through misleading claims about investment performance and trading strategies. Reports indicated that some investors were members of Bethel Church, and that Piercey had recruited fellow congregants. Church officials stated that Piercey attended services but was not an "official member" and that the church was unaware of his financial activities. In 2025 Piercey pleaded guilty to 27 counts of wire fraud, money laundering and witness tampering.

The case drew attention because it followed an earlier investment fraud involving Bethel congregants. In 2009, church attendee David Souza was convicted for defrauding fellow congregants through a fraudulent investment scheme, using marketing materials with the slogan "Where business is moral and the miraculous is routine". Souza was sentenced to an 18-year prison term.

Following these incidents, Bethel Church maintained a public investment disclaimer stating that church leaders are not financial advisors, prohibiting the promotion of investment opportunities on church property and encouraging members to seek independent professional advice before making investments.

== Influence on Redding ==
Local news coverage has noted the church's civic and economic engagement in Redding, a small city in northern California with about 90,000 residents. Bethel's membership is therefore approximately 10% of the size of the Redding population. With this growth, the church's influence in the city has increased, with a mixed reception.

Bethel donated $500,000 to the city of Redding's police in April 2017, and later led a campaign to raise $740,000 to fund the salaries of four police officers. In 2018, a direct flight from Redding to Los Angeles was opened, and Bethel Church used its business relationship with United Airlines as leverage and committed $450,000 to a revenue guarantee fund needed to operate the line.

However, some Redding residents are worried by the influence Bethel Church has on the city. One of their main worries is the belief held by Bethel, the Seven Mountain Mandate, that Christians must influence seven "mountains", including government, media, business and education, in order for Jesus to return to earth. One such instance of influence was the donation to the police force. The offer to donate caused controversy as some in the community thought the church was trying to pay off the city for future building permits. The city ultimately voted to receive the donation. Seven months after receiving the donation, Redding City Council unanimously approved a $96-million new Bethel campus, despite dozens of formally submitted citizen concerns. Another instance was when they advertised a seminar for public and private school teachers that mentioned "God wants to come to your school with His presence, His peace and His strategies". A group connected to the church later opened a public charter school, which, according to a teacher job ad, has a "Kingdom culture and all Bethel-connected board of directors and principal".

== National politics ==
=== Presidency of Donald Trump ===
In a 2016 Facebook post, senior pastor Bill Johnson explained his decision to vote for Donald Trump, citing concerns about abortion, same-sex marriage, and globalization, which he described as contrary to biblical values. His wife and senior pastor, Beni Johnson, also expressed support for Trump.

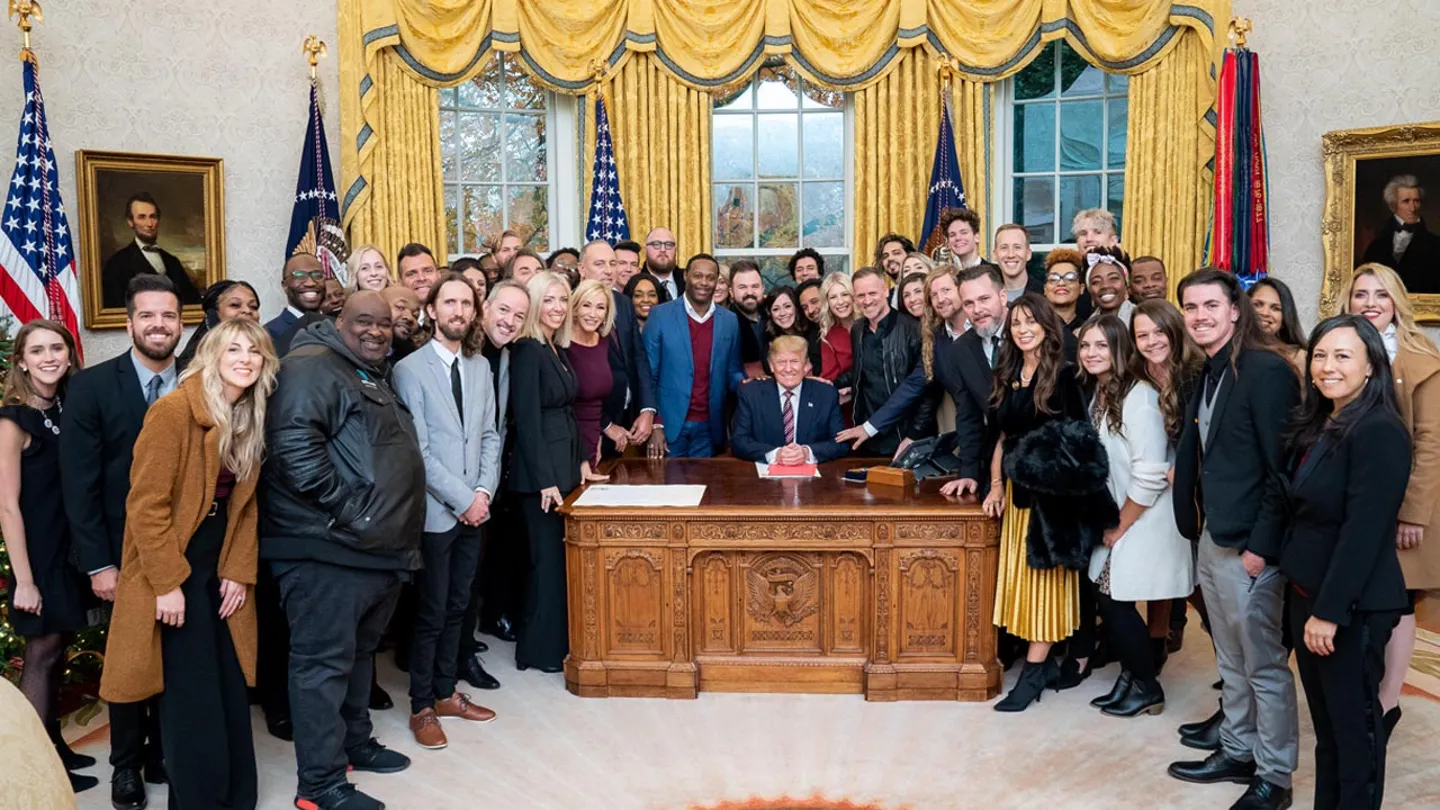
Trump surrounded by worship leaders from across the country whom he invited to pray for him in the Oval Office (December 2019). On Trump's left: Eric Johnson, Jenn Johnson and Sean Feucht from Bethel Church.

Johnson continued to be supportive of Trump during his presidency. Bethel Music leaders Brian Johnson and Jenn Johnson, and former worship leader Sean Feucht were among the worship leaders who visited Trump in the Oval Office, where they prayed for him and sang worship music.

During the impeachment process of Trump, senior associate leader Kris Vallotton prophesied during a sermon, 10 days before the impeachment started, that God would end the process, stating "the Lord is gonna step into the impeachment process. I mean I know it's gonna happen". He went on to say that he believed God would give Trump another term and that "even though people may not fully understand why God would want to keep Trump in office they should just trust that there is a greater plan". According to Vallotton, this was "not about politics". Vallotton later apologized for being wrong about the prophecy.

Bethel leaders Brian Johnson, Jenn Johnson, and Kris Vallotton were among the signers of the letter from evangelical leaders critical of Christianity Today's editorial that called for Trump to be removed from office.

Senior leader Kris Vallotton publicly prophesied that Donald Trump would win the 2020 U.S. presidential election. After the prophecy failed, he issued a public apology, which was later deleted. Critics have used the incident to question the accountability of self-proclaimed prophetic leaders, especially when their declarations are tied to partisan politics.

=== Election denial (2020) ===
After Joe Biden's victory Bethel's leader Bill Johnson stated in an interview with the David J. Harris Jr. Show that he is "100% confident it [Biden's victory] was done by fraud".

=== QAnon conspiracy theory ===
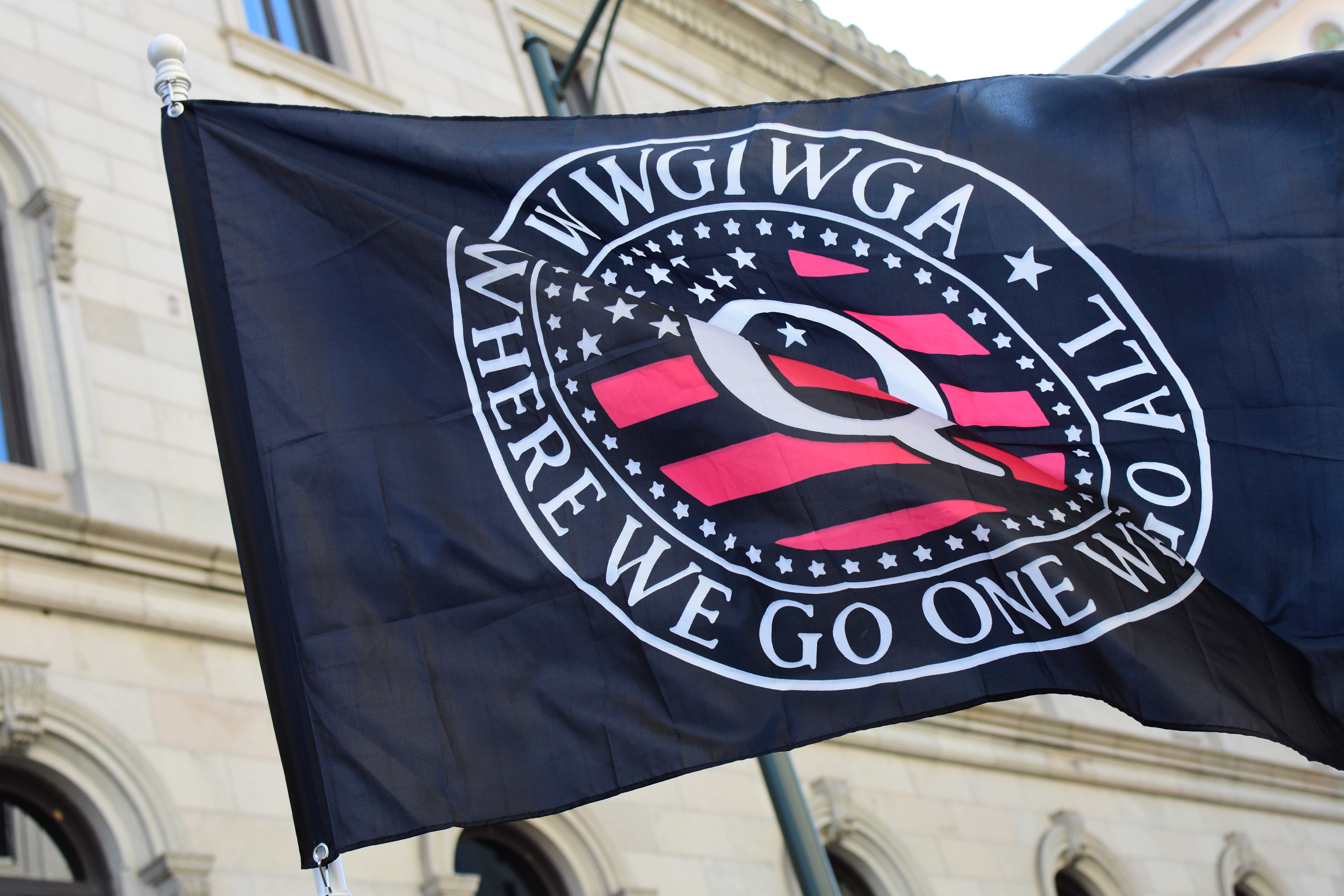
QAnon flag featuring an American flag overlaid with the Q logo alongside the slogan "Where we go one, we go all".

QAnon, a far-right conspiracy theory with direct roots in Pizzagate and antisemitic tropes, has been promoted by Bethel's senior pastor Danny Silk. QAnon's core belief is that a cabal of Satanic, cannibalistic child molesters in league with the deep state is operating a global child sex trafficking ring and that Donald Trump is secretly leading the fight against them.

In 2020, Danny Silk authored a number of social media posts with QAnon-related ideas and hashtags, but did not respond to subsequent media requests for comment.

=== Opposition to restrictions on conversion therapy ===
In 2018, the church publicly opposed three bills in the California state legislature that would have restricted conversion therapy, a pseudoscientific practice of attempting to change an individual's sexual orientation. The church, whose position is that "same-sex sexual behavior is unhealthful", believed the bills would restrict their ministry. Their opposition included a released statement, letters to legislators and encouragement of congregants to contact legislators through a sermon titled "What Would Jesus Do in a PC World?" by Kris Vallotton and tweets, also by Vallotton, that specifically addressed those that had "come out of homosexuality". Vallotton later retracted his sermon, but stood by his opposition.

In April 2021, Bethel's senior associate leader – Kris Vallotton – spoke against the Equality Act with Elizabeth Woning, the co-founder of the CHANGED Movement, encouraging people to contact their senators and voice their opposition to the bill.

=== Sean Feucht for Congress ===
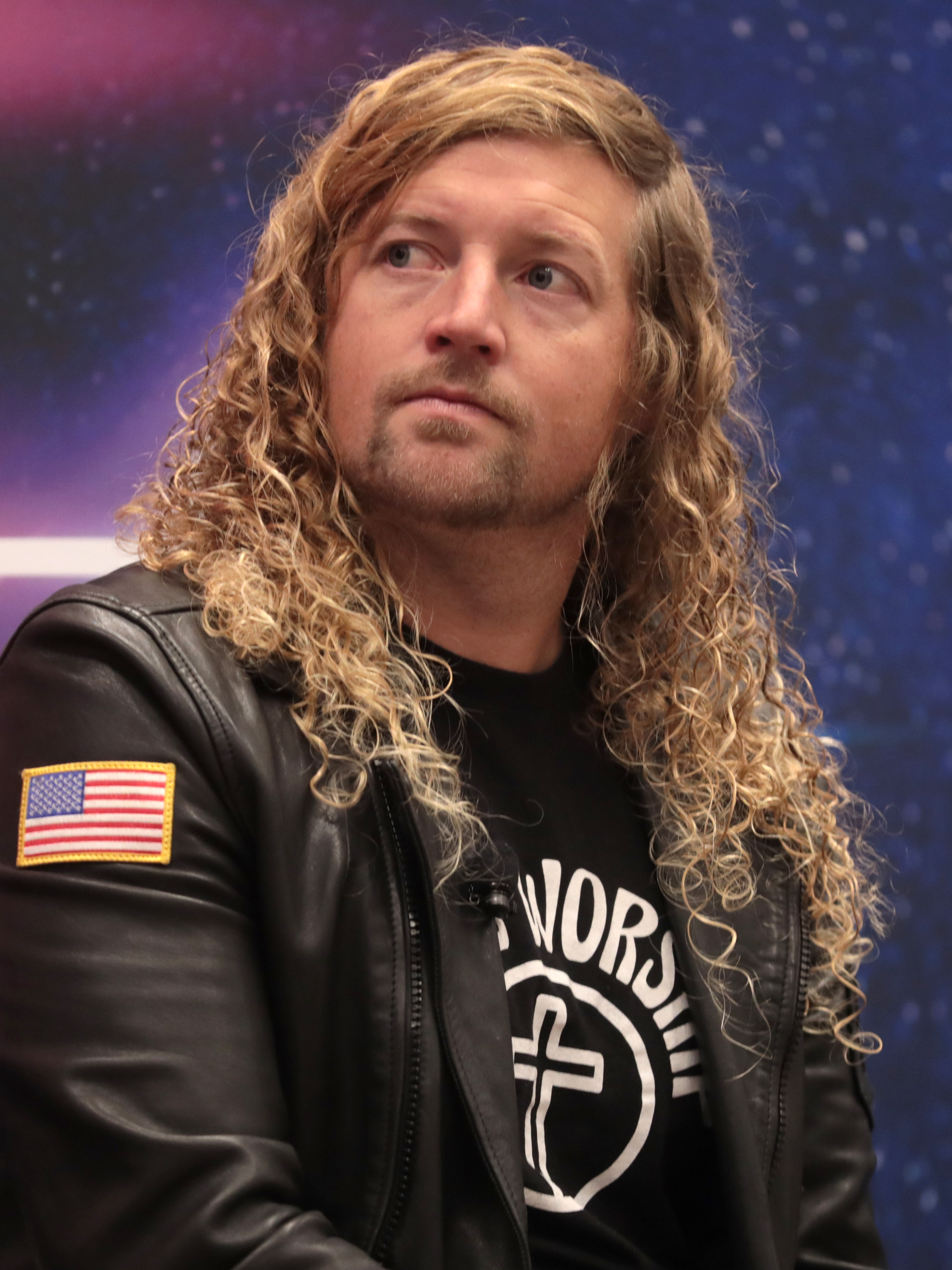
Sean Feucht ran as a Republican in California's 3rd congressional district primary in 2020.

In September 2019, former Bethel worship leader Sean Feucht announced he was running for Congress as a Republican on a socially conservative platform. His announcement video featured a Bethel Music song with the lyrics "We won't stop singing until the whole world looks like heaven". He placed third in the March 3, 2020, non-partisan primary behind Democrat John Garamendi and Republican Tamika Hamilton.

== Local politics ==
Bethel Church has played a significant role in political debates in Redding due to the involvement of church members in local government, civic organizations and public affairs. Bethel's influence has been a recurring topic in local elections and municipal governance.

=== 2022 Redding City Council election ===
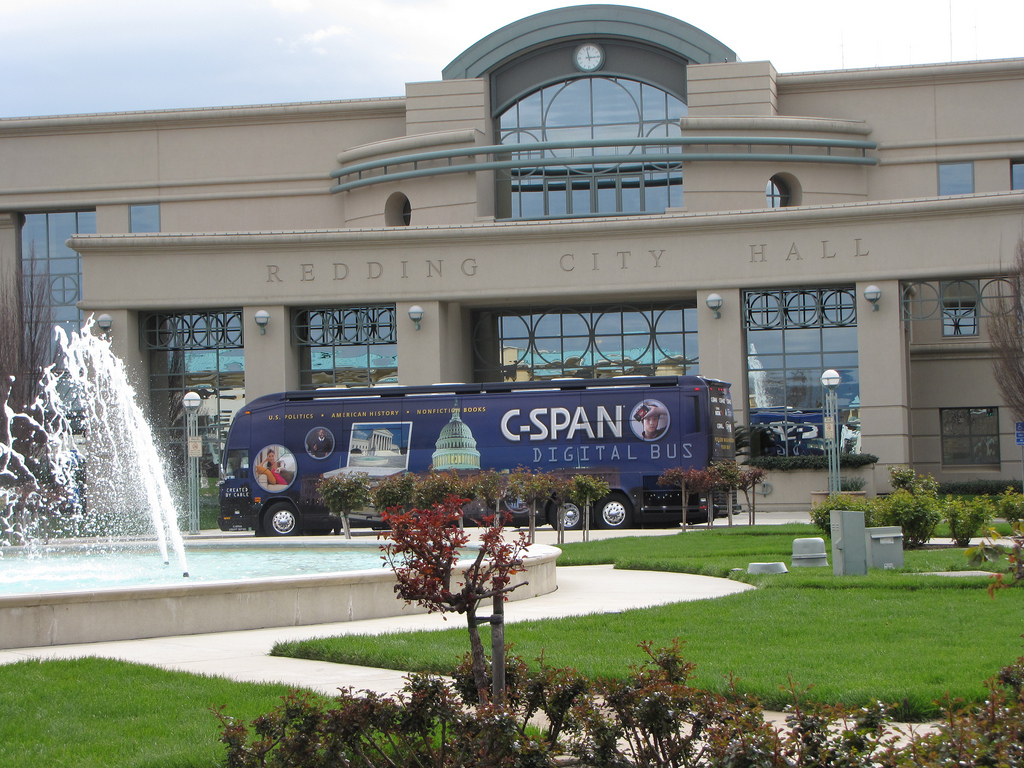
Redding City Hall

Public criticism of Bethel's political influence intensified during the 2022 Redding City Council elections. Critics expressed concerns about church influence in civic institutions stemming from Bethel's size, organizational resources and adherence to the Seven Mountain Mandate - a dominionist ideology within evangelical Christianity that holds that believers should dominate seven spheres of society, including business and government.

Two Bethel-affiliated candidates - Tenessa Audette, a teacher of the "God and Government" course at Bethel School of Supernatural Ministry, and Jack Munns won seats joining incumbent Julie Winter, a Bethel elder. This gave Bethel-affiliated council members 3 of the 5 seats on the Redding City Council.

=== Mayoral appointment controversy (2023-2024) ===
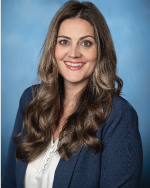
Tenessa Audette, former mayor of Redding, was elected by Bethel-affiliated city council members

In December 2023, controversy arose when the Redding City Council selected council member Tenessa Audette as mayor and Julie Winter as vice mayor. Under Redding's council-manager system, the mayor is selected by fellow council members rather than through direct election. This departed from a long standing customary practice of elevating the sitting vice mayor (then Mark Mezzano). Then-mayor Michael Dacquisto described the decision as "the Bethel juggernaut at work". At the time, Audette, Winter and Munns all had ties to Bethel Church and voted together to install Audette as mayor.

The unconventional appointment led to a lawsuit filed in 2024 by Redding resident Kathryn McDonald. The suit alleged that Audette, Winter, and Munns violated California's Brown Act by reaching an agreement regarding the mayoral and vice-mayoral appointments outside of a public meeting. McDonald sought to invalidate the appointments, arguing that the vote had been predetermined through private coordination. The defendants denied wrongdoing.

== See also ==
- Jesus Culture
