= Mike Winger =

American theologian and Christian apologist

- Occupations: Theologian; apologist
- Spouse: Allison Winger

YouTube information
- Channel: @MikeWinger
- Genres: Christian theology; Christian apologetics
- Subscribers: 1,010,000
- Views: 244 million
- Last updated: June 3, 2026
- Website: biblethinker.org

Mike Winger is an American charismatic evangelical Bible teacher, Christian apologist, and YouTube personality.

He graduated from the School of Ministry at Calvary Chapel Costa Mesa and was ordained in 2006. Having served in various ministries and as a youth pastor until he left church ministry and transitioned to working full time on his online work on YouTube and his website "BibleThinker".

Winger teaches biblical theology from a charismatic viewpoint for lay audiences. He is known for publishing in-depth exposés of spiritual abuse and sexual misconduct in Christian circles, primarily surrounding individuals connected to the charismatic movement through Bethel Church (Redding), International House of Prayer, MorningStar Ministries, and Jesus Image. Winger is a critic of cults, progressive Christianity, and atheism.
