= Bill Johnson (pastor) =

American Christian minister (born 1951)

- Senior leader
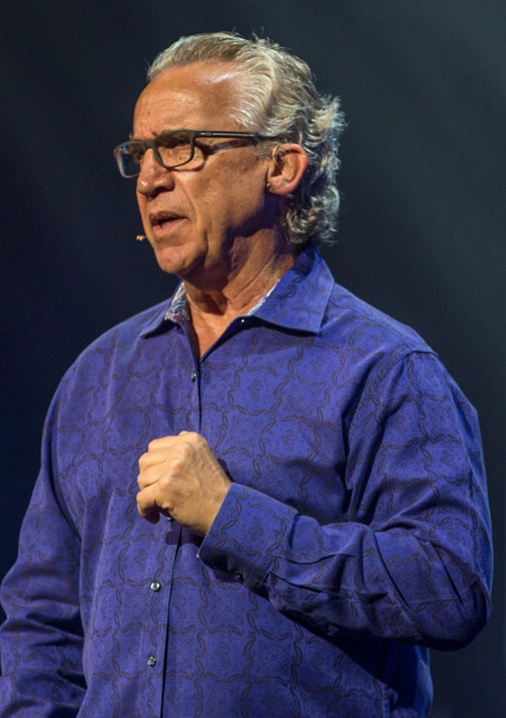
- Church: Bethel Church

Personal details
- Born: Bill Bryant Johnson; July 18, 1951 (age 75) Alexandria, Minnesota, U.S.
- Denomination: Charismatic movement
- Spouse: Brenda "Beni" Johnson (m. 1973; died 2022) Linda Francoeur (m. 2026)
- Children: Eric Johnson; Brian Johnson; Leah Valenzuela
- Occupation: Pastor, author

Bill Bryant Johnson (born July 18, 1951) is the senior leader of Bethel Church, a Charismatic megachurch in Redding, California. Under his leadership, the congregation reportedly grew from approximately 2,000 members in 1996 to almost 9,000 in 2026. Johnson promotes beliefs related to revival, faith healing, and supernatural manifestations—topics, which are central to the Bethel movement and have influenced contemporary charismatic Christianity.

In 1998, he co-founded the Bethel School of Supernatural Ministry. Johnson is also an author and itinerant speaker, appearing in Christian media and documentary films. His ministry has attracted both widespread support and criticism, particularly in relation to theology, charismatic practices, and political involvement. Johnson has also gained recognition in popular media, appearing in documentaries like Father of Lights and American Gospel: Christ Alone, and in interviews with CBN and Charisma magazine.

Politically, he has expressed conservative views, endorsing Donald Trump in 2016 and 2020 due to positions against abortion, same-sex marriage, and globalization. Johnson opposes homosexuality as a sin, aligning with Bethel Church's stance on heterosexual marriage. The church actively supports the practice of conversion therapy.

== Biography ==
Johnson is a fifth-generation pastor and has held the position of senior leader at Bethel Church since 1996. His ministry is associated with a charismatic movement emphasizing revival, healing, and the gifts of the Holy Spirit. According to Christianity Today, Johnson holds "considerable influence among charismatic Christians all over the world". His father, M. Earl Johnson, previously served as Bethel's senior pastor from 1968 to 1982, during the church's affiliation with the Assemblies of God. Before joining Bethel, Johnson and his wife served as the senior pastors of Mountain Chapel in Weaverville, California from 1978 to 1996.

In 1987, Johnson attended a "signs and wonders" conference led by John Wimber in hopes of advancing healing ministry, but later expressed disappointment: “They had fruit for what they believed. All I had was good doctrine.” He identified this as a turning point, stating that embracing “faith”—understood as taking risk—opened the way for reported healing manifestations in his ministry. In 1995, he traveled to Toronto, Canada to attend some of the Toronto Blessing revival meetings, where he described being significantly affected by the spiritual atmosphere and shifted toward a stronger emphasis on charismatic gifts and supernatural ministry in his leadership.

In 1998, Johnson, along with Bethel Senior Associate Leader Kris Vallotton, started the Bethel School of Supernatural Ministry. The school has over 2,000 students from 57 countries. Johnson is also part of the Core Residential Faculty at Wagner University in Rancho Cucamonga, CA.

Brenda ("Beni"), the wife of Bill Johnson, died of cancer on July 13, 2022.

Bill and Brenda Johnson have three children including: Brian Johnson, Eric Johnson and Leah Valenzuela.

In July 2026, Johnson announced his engagement while speaking at Kenneth Copeland's Southwest Believers' Convention, despite being on sabbatical at the time. He had proposed to Linda Francoeur on his 75th birthday and married her the following month in a private ceremony officiated by fellow Bethel Church senior leader Kris Vallotton.

== Ties to the New Apostolic Reformation ==
According to scholars Holly Pivec and R. Douglas Geivett Bill Johnson is a key leader in the New Apostolic Reformation (NAR), a religious movement characterized by a belief in modern-day apostles and prophets, who are supposed to receive revelation, prophecy and lead the church; a belief that church and state should not be separated, according to the Seven Mountain Mandate, a form of dominionism; and a belief that miracles such as healing and prophecy are within the reach of ordinary church members (signs and wonders).

Christianity Today, an evangelical Christian magazine, says "Bill Johnson is regularly listed as an NAR leader." The Christian Research Institute, an authority on evangelical religions, says: "The vanguard of the NAR is Bethel Church in Redding, California, led by the charismatic (in both senses of the word) pastor, Bill Johnson, who has stretched Bethel's influence over the entire globe through the Bethel School of Supernatural Ministry (BSSM)." Salon magazine describes "Bill Johnson's Bethel Church in Redding, California" as one of the NAR's "star megachurch ministries". A 2022 dissertation from the Theology School of the University of Otago in New Zealand, titled "From Peter Wagner to Bill Johnson: The History and Epistemology of the 'New Apostolic Reformation'" also affirms that the teachings of Bill Johnson and Bethel Church are representative of the New Apostolic Reformation.

Pivec and Geivett point out that Bill Johnson's teachings at Bethel strongly align with core NAR beliefs:

1. Bethel treats Bill Johnson as an apostle and Kris Vallotton as a prophet, each having special ecclesiastical authority and believed to receive divine revelations. Pivec and Geivett consider this the core issue in identifying NAR beliefs.
2. Bethel believes in an end-times "billion soul" harvest ⏤ "Johnson, like many other NAR leaders, teaches that the largest revival the world will ever experience is about to occur, fueled by unprecedented miraculous signs and wonders to be performed by the apostles, prophets, and their followers."
3. Bethel believes in "signs and wonders," e.g., their BSSM (the Bethel School for Supernatural Ministry) claims to teach students how to cure ailments spiritually and to make prophesies.
4. Bethel uses the Passion Translation of the Bible, which Johnson has endorsed, even though most Christian scholars reject its accuracy.
5. Bethel teaches the Seven Mountain Mandate, a kind of dominionism, another core aspect of NAR beliefs.
6. Bethel teaches that doctrinal opponents, political opponents, and the sick may be afflicted by demons; even institutions such as government, media, and education may be ruled over by demonic spirits called "territorial spirits." Demons can be cast out by a process of "spiritual warfare", using techniques such "prophetic declarations", "prayer walking", "warfare prayer", or "binding and loosing prayer".

Pivec and Geivett acknowledge Bill Johnson has claimed not to belong to the NAR, e.g., In Christianity Today, Bill Johnson said "the church does not have any official ties to the NAR" and when later asked for his thoughts on the New Apostolic Reformation replied, "I'm not completely clear on what it is." Pivec and Geivett point out that there is no formal NAR organization and many NAR leaders now disavow the label after negative NAR press coverage, whereas before they had embraced it. An Atlantic Magazine article also mentions this rebranding: "Early leaders called it the New Apostolic Reformation, or NAR, although some of those same leaders are now engaged in a rebranding effort as the antidemocratic character of the movement has come to light.”

Pivec and Geivett point out that not only do Bill Johnson's beliefs align with core NAR beliefs; but also that he is treated as a leader and apostle by other NAR leaders, such as Lance Wallnau, with whom he co-authored the book Invading Babylon: The 7 Mountain Mandate, and Che Ahn, who wrote the book, Modern-day Apostles. Bill Johnson further not only endorsed Che Ahn's book but also wrote the foreword to it. Finally, "NAR apostle C. Peter Wagner" ⏤ often considered the foundational leader of the New Apostolic Reformation ⏤ said Johnson was one of the "apostolic pillars of today's church" in 2008 on GOD TV.

Pivec’s blog post discussing C. Peter Wagner’s endorsement of Johnson reflects this view, being titled simply, “Yes, Bethel Redding and Bill Johnson are part of the New Apostolic Reformation.” Bill Johnson, however, prefers to describe Bethel Leaders Network, which comprises more than 150 ministries and religious organizations as an “apostolic network”.

== Media appearances ==
Johnson has appeared in multiple documentaries, including Father of Lights and Holy Ghost Reborn, produced by Darren Wilson. He has also been interviewed and highlighted in several CBN news stories. He was featured on the cover of Charisma magazine in August 2016 with a story titled "Born for Revival." Johnson was also a guest on Sid Roth's It's Supernatural in October 2016. He was later featured in the 2018 documentary American Gospel: Christ Alone which criticized aspects of the prosperity gospel and portrayed Johnson as a key figure within that movement.

== Political and cultural views ==
In a 2016 Facebook post, Johnson explained his decision to vote for Donald Trump, citing concerns about abortion, same-sex marriage, and globalization, which he described as contrary to biblical values. His wife, Beni Johnson, also expressed support for Trump. Johnson reaffirmed his endorsement during the 2020 presidential election.

Bill Johnson opposes homosexuality calling it a sin and "violation of design". In a Facebook video blog he elaborated on the issue stating that "God did not make those human bodies to come together, to fit, in that way". Bethel Church later published an official statement affirming its belief that sexual intimacy belongs within heterosexual marriage—but also expressing compassion and respectful engagement toward LGBTQ individuals.

In 2018, Bethel Church publicly opposed three bills in the California state legislature that would have restricted conversion therapy, expressing concern that the bills could limit their ability to provide ministry to individuals seeking to change their sexual orientation. The church released a public statement, submitted letters to lawmakers, and encouraged congregants to contact legislators. These efforts included a sermon titled "What Would Jesus Do in a PC World?" by senior associate leader Kris Vallotton, who also tweeted in support of individuals who had "come out of homosexuality".

After Joe Biden's victory Johnson stated in an interview with the David J. Harris Jr. Show that he is "100% confident it [Biden's victory] was done by fraud".

== Published works ==
- When Heaven Invades Earth (Destiny Image Publishers, 2003) ISBN 0-7684-2952-8
- The Supernatural Power of a Transformed Mind (Destiny Image Publishers, 2005) ISBN 0-7684-2252-3
- When Heaven Invades Earth Devotional & Journal (Destiny Image Publishers, August 2005) ISBN 0-7684-2297-3
- Shifting Shadow of Supernatural Power: A Prophetic Manual for Those Wanting to Move in God's Supernatural Power (co-author) (Destiny Image Publishers, August 2006) ISBN 0-7684-2369-4
- Dreaming With God (Destiny Image, December 2006) ISBN 0-7684-2399-6
- The Supernatural Ways of Royalty (co-author) (Destiny Image Publishers, 2006) ISBN 0-7684-2323-6
- The Supernatural Ways of Royalty Leader's Guide (co-author) (Destiny Image Publishers, 2006) ISBN 978-0768415810
- The Supernatural Power of a Transformed Mind 40-Day Devotional and Personal Journal (Destiny Image, September 2006) ISBN 0-7684-2399-6 ISBN 0-7684-2375-9
- Here Comes Heaven!: A Kid's Guide to God's Supernatural Power (co-author) (Destiny Image, October 2007) ISBN 0-7684-2502-6
- Face to Face with God (Charisma House, 2007) ISBN 978-1-59979-070-1
- Strengthen Yourself in The Lord (Destiny Image Publishers, 2007) ISBN 0-7684-2427-5
- A Life of Miracles: A 365-day guide to prayer and miracles (Destiny Image, February 2008) ISBN 978-0-7684-2612-0
- Strengthen Yourself in the Lord (Audio Book) (Destiny Image, February 2008) ISBN 0-7684-2610-3
- Release the Power of Jesus (Destiny Imae Publishers, 2009) ISBN 978-0768427127
- The Essential Guide to Healing (co-author) (Chosen Books, 2011) ISBN 978-0-8007-9519-1
- Walking in the Supernatural: Another Cup of Spiritual Java (Destiny Image Publishers, 2012) ISBN 978-0768440775
- Hosting the Presence (Destiny Image Publishers, 2012) ISBN 9780768441291
- Hosting the Presence Every Day: 365 Days to Unveiling Heaven's Agenda for Your Life (Destiny Image Publishers, 2014) ISBN 978-0768405248
- Hosting the Presence Workbook: Unveiling Heaven's Agenda (Destiny Image Publishers, 2013) ISBN 978-0768403640
- Invading Babylon: The 7 Mountain Mandate (co-author) (Destiny Image Publishers, 2013) ISBN 978-0768403350
- Discovering Your Purpose: A Short Interview with Bill Johnson (Bill Johnson Ministries, 2014) ISBN 978-0989684729
- Spiritual Java (Destiny Image Publishers, 2016) ISBN 978-0768434880
- Healing Unplugged: Conversations and Insights from Two Veteran Healing Leaders (Destiny Image Publishers, 2016) ISBN 978-0800795276
- Releasing the Spirit of Prophecy: The Supernatural Power of Testimony (Destiny Image Publishers, 2014) ISBN 978-0768414363
- Experience the Impossible (Chosen Books, 2014) ISBN 978-0-8007-9617-4
- The Supernatural Power of a Transformed Mind Study Guide: Access to a Life of Miracles (Chosen Books, 2014) ISBN 978-0768404234
- Strengthen Yourself in The Lord Leader's Guide (Destiny Image Publishers, 2015) ISBN 978-0768407785
- Strengthen Yourself in The Lord Study Guide (Destiny Image Publishers, 2015) ISBN 978-0768407778
- Power That Changes the World: Creating Eternal Impact in the Here and Now (Destiny Image Publishers, 2015) ISBN 978-0800796860
- Defining Moments (Whitaker House, 2016) ISBN 978-1-6291-1547-4
- God is Good (Destiny Image Publishers, 2016) ISBN 978-0-7684-3716-4
- God is Good Interactive Manual: He's Better Than You Think (Destiny Image Publishers, 2016) ISBN 978-0768410365
- A Daily Invitation to Friendship With God: Dreaming with God to Transform Your World (Destiny Image Publishers, 2016) ISBN 978-0768434880
- Jesus Christ is Perfect Theology (Destiny Image Publishers, 2016) ISBN 978-0768415988
- Encountering the Goodness of God: 90 Daily Devotions (Destiny Image Publishers, 2017) ISBN 978-0768414868
- God is Really Good (Destiny Image Publishers, 2017) ISBN 978-0768415841
- When Heaven Invades Earth for Teens: Your Guide to God's Supernatural Power (Destiny Image Publishers, 2017) ISBN 978-0768416886
- Is God Really Good?: Bill Johnson Answers Your Toughest Questions about the Goodness of God (Destiny Image Publishers, 2017) ISBN 978-0768419252
- The Way of Life (Destiny Image Publishers, 2018) ISBN 978-0-7684-4272-4
- The Resting Place: Living Immersed in the Presence of God (Destiny Image Publishers, 2019) ISBN 978-0768448238
- Meeting God Face to Face: Daily Encouragement to Seek His Presence and Favor (Charisma House, 2019) ISBN 978-1629995816
- The Way of Life Leader's Guide: Experiencing the Culture of Heaven on Earth (Destiny Image, 2019) ISBN 978-0768448603
- Born for Significance: Master the Purpose, Process, and Peril of Promotion (Charisma House, 2020) ISBN 978-1629998381
- Raising Giant-Killers: Releasing Your Child's Divine Destiny through Intentional Parenting (Destiny Image Publishers, 2020) ISBN 978-0800799380
- Raising Giant-Killers Leaders Guide: Releasing Your Child's Divine Destiny through Intentional Parenting (Destiny Image Publishers, 2020) ISBN 978-0800799267
- Raising Giant-Killers Participant's Guide: Releasing Your Child's Divine Destiny through Intentional Parenting (Destiny Image Publishers, 2020) ISBN 978-0800799250
- The Mind of God: How His Wisdom Can Transform Our World (Destiny Image Publishers, 2020) ISBN 978-0800799540
- How to Respond to Disaster: By Living Anchored in the Goodness of God (Destiny Image Publishers, 2020) ISBN 978-0768456813
- HOPE in Any Crisis: Stop Fear and Release God's Goodness In Uncertain Times (Destiny Image Publishers, 2020) ISBN 978-1629999043
- The King's Way of Life (Destiny Image Publishers, 2020) ISBN 978-0768451108
- Mornings and Evenings in His Presence: A Lifestyle of Daily Encounters with God (Destiny Image Publishers, 2020) ISBN 978-0768455991
- Rejoice into Joy: Three Keys to Experiencing the Fullness of Heaven's Joy (Destiny Image Publishers, 2021) ISBN 978-0768457407
- Your Journey to Significance: A Daily Discovery of Who God Created You to Be (Charisma House, 2021) ISBN 978-1629999579
- Open Heavens: Position Yourself to Encounter the God of Revival (Destiny Image Publishers, 2021) ISBN 978-0768457698
- Peace in Every Storm: 52 Declarations & Meditations for Difficult Times (BroadStreet Publishing Group LLC, 2021) ISBN 978-1424561919
- Bible Promises and Prayers for Children: Releasing Your Child's Divine Destiny (Destiny Image Publishers, 2021) ISBN 978-0800762124
- Born for Significance Study Guide (Charisma House, 2021) ISBN 978-1636410005
