= Benny Hinn =

American-Canadian evangelist (born 1952)

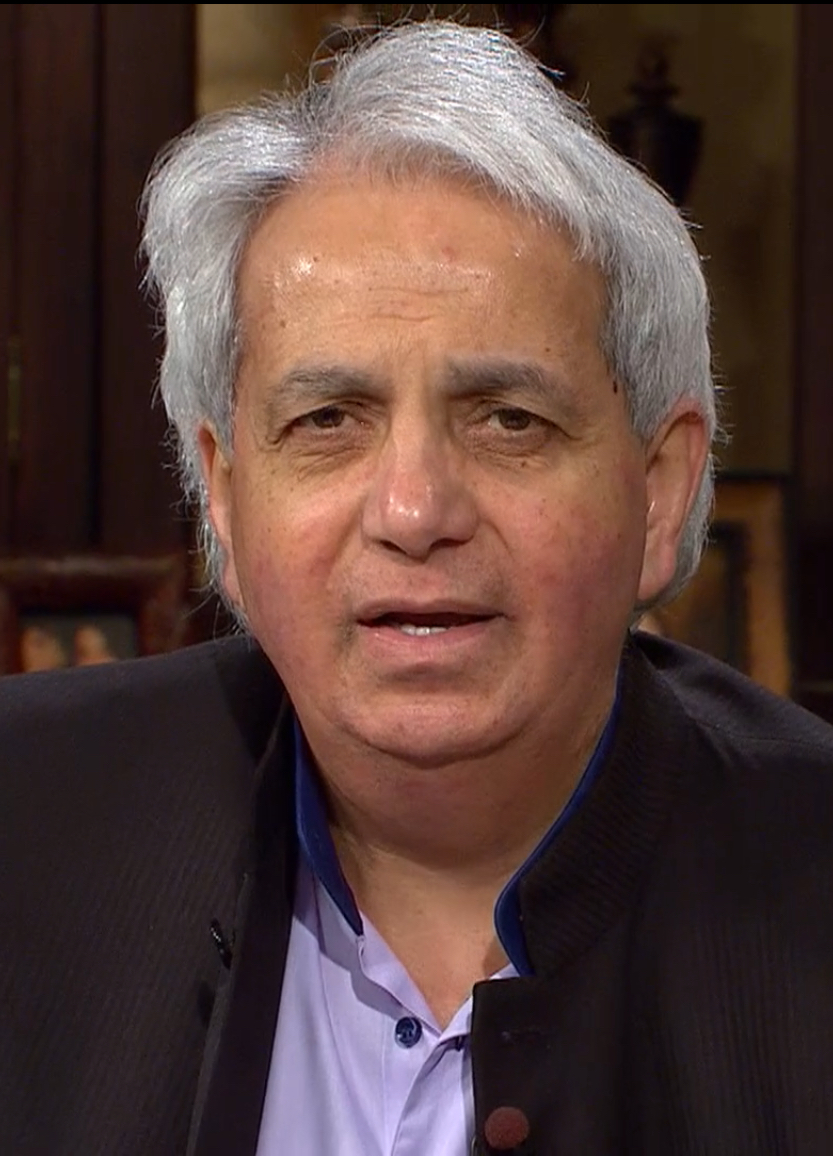
- Hinn in 2019

Personal life
- Born: Toufik Benedictus Hinn; 3 December 1952 (age 73) Jaffa, Israel
- Spouse: Suzanne Harthern (m. 1979; div. 2010) (m. 2013; div. 2025)
- Children: 4
- Citizenship: United States
- Occupation: Televangelist, author, speaker
- Website: www.bennyhinn.org

Religious life
- Religion: Charismatic Christianity

Toufik Benedictus "Benny" Hinn (born 3 December 1952) is an Israeli-born American-Canadian televangelist associated with charismatic Christianity. He is known for his regular "Miracle Crusades", which are faith-healing events held in large venues and broadcast internationally through his television ministry.

He is also known for hosting the "This is your day" TV program.

Hinn's ministry has been criticized over its faith healing claims and financial practices. His ministry was among six televangelist organizations examined by the United States Senate Committee on Finance beginning in 2007.

== Early life and Canada ==
Hinn was born in Jaffa in 1952 to parents born in Palestine who had Greek, Palestinian, and Armenian ancestry. He was raised within the Eastern Orthodox tradition and baptized by the patriarch of Jerusalem.

His family emigrated to Toronto, Canada in 1968, where he attended Georges Vanier Secondary School but did not graduate. In his books, Hinn states falsely that his father was the mayor of Jaffa at the time of his birth and that he had a stutter as a child. In 1972, he claimed to become a born-again Christian.

In December 1973, Hinn traveled Pittsburgh to attend a "miracle service" conducted by evangelist Kathryn Kuhlman. Although he did not meet Kuhlman personally, he often attended her "healing services" and has often cited her as an influence in his life. In 1974, he was invited to speak about his spiritual experience at Trinity Pentecostal Church in Oshawa and claimed to have been cured of his stuttering.

== Ministry ==
After moving to the United States, Hinn founded the Orlando Christian Center in 1983. He began claiming that God was using him as a conduit for healings and began holding healing services in his church. Eventually, these "Miracle Crusades" were soon held at large stadiums and auditoriums across the United States and the world, the first nationally televised service being held in Flint, Michigan, in 1989.

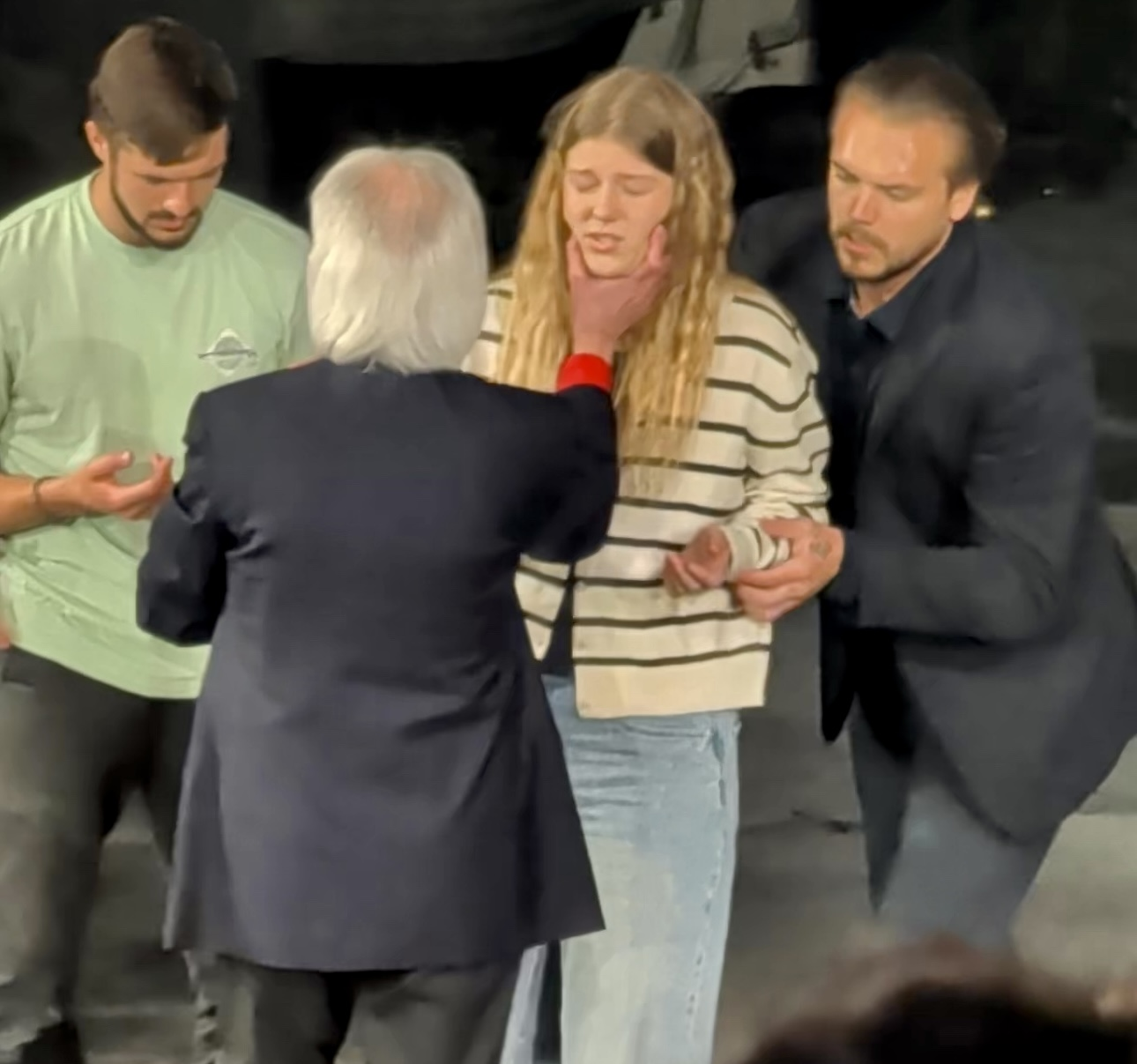
Benny Hinn ministering at Jesus Image Church in Orlando, Florida (2025).

In 1990, Hinn launched the television program This Is Your Day. The program initially aired on the Trinity Broadcasting Network and later appeared on several Christian television networks.

In 1999, Hinn stepped down as pastor of the Orlando Christian Center and moved his ministry's administrative headquarters to Grapevine, Texas.

In February 2024, Hinn held a Healing the Nation Crusade at Nyayo National Stadium in Nairobi, Kenya. Kenyan president William Ruto and First Lady Rachel Ruto attended, and Hinn's ministry said that more than 500,000 people attended the two-day event.

Former heavyweight champion Evander Holyfield, who was diagnosed with a non-compliant left ventricle, has credited his healing to Benny Hinn, stating that through God working through Hinn, he was healed as he had "a warm feeling" go through his chest as Hinn touched him.

Hinn has regularly appeared at Jesus Image, an Orlando charismatic ministry founded by his son-in-law Michael Koulianos. Jesus Image's archive lists Benny Hinn as a guest speaker at the church dating back to December 2019.

As of May 2024, Hinn's net worth is estimated to be approximately $60 million.

== Theology and practices ==
Hinn's teachings are charismatic and have been historically associated with the Word of Faith movement.

Hinn describes the anointing as the power of the Holy Spirit and has incorporated physical gestures into his healing services. He has been observed blowing on attendees, touching them, flicking his suit jacket toward members of the audience, after which people fall. Some participants fall backward.

=== Slain in the Spirit ===
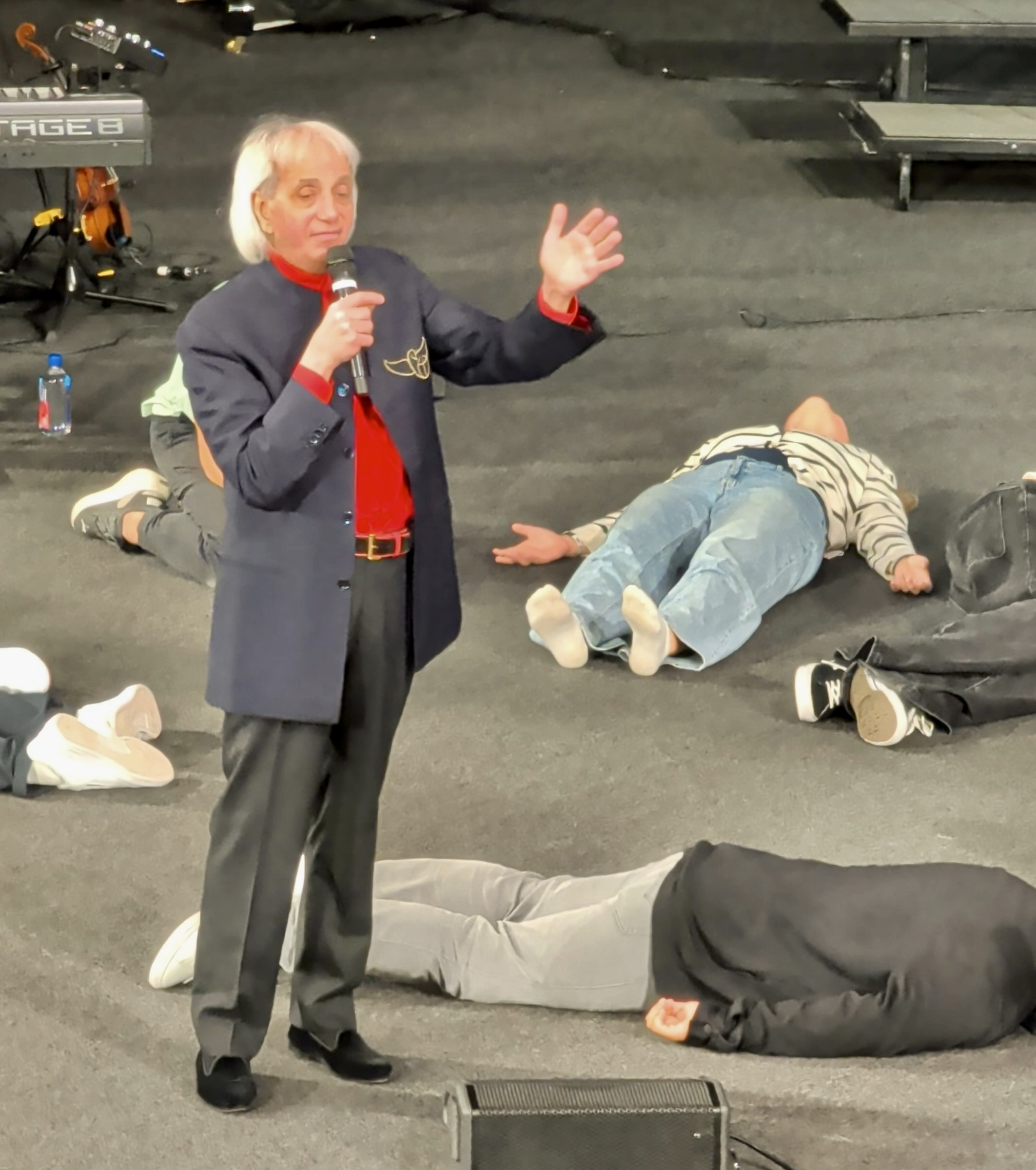
Benny Hinn preaching at Jesus Image Church in 2025. Several attendees are lying on the floor after falling during a practice commonly described as being "slain in the Spirit".

A recurring feature of Hinn’s events is the charismatic practice commonly described as being "slain in the Spirit", in which participants fall backward following prayer or physical contact on stage.

Skeptical investigator Joe Nickell, who attended one of Hinn's crusades, attributed participants' responses to expectation and suggestion rather than supernatural causes.

=== Faith healing ===
Faith healing is a central part of Hinn's ministry. At his crusades he has claimed that people were healed of conditions including blindness, cancer, and other illnesses.

Several investigations have questioned whether such claims can be independently verified. A 2003 Los Angeles Times investigation examined a number of claimed healings, including that of a legally blind boy whose apparent improvement was presented during one of Hinn's services. The boy later told the newspaper that his vision had not improved.

== Missions ==
Benny Hinn Ministries claims to support 60 mission organizations and several orphanages worldwide, as well as to house and feed over 100,000 children each year and 45,000 children on a daily basis, thanks to his donors. His ministry donated $100,000 for relief supplies for Hurricane Katrina victims in 2005 and $250,000 to the tsunami relief effort in 2007.

== Criticism and controversy ==
Hinn has been criticized for theological remarks and claims he has made during TV appearances. In 1999, he said on the Trinity Broadcasting Network that he believed dead people would be resurrected after relatives placed their hands on television sets carrying the network's programming.

=== 1987 Oklahoma lawsuit ===
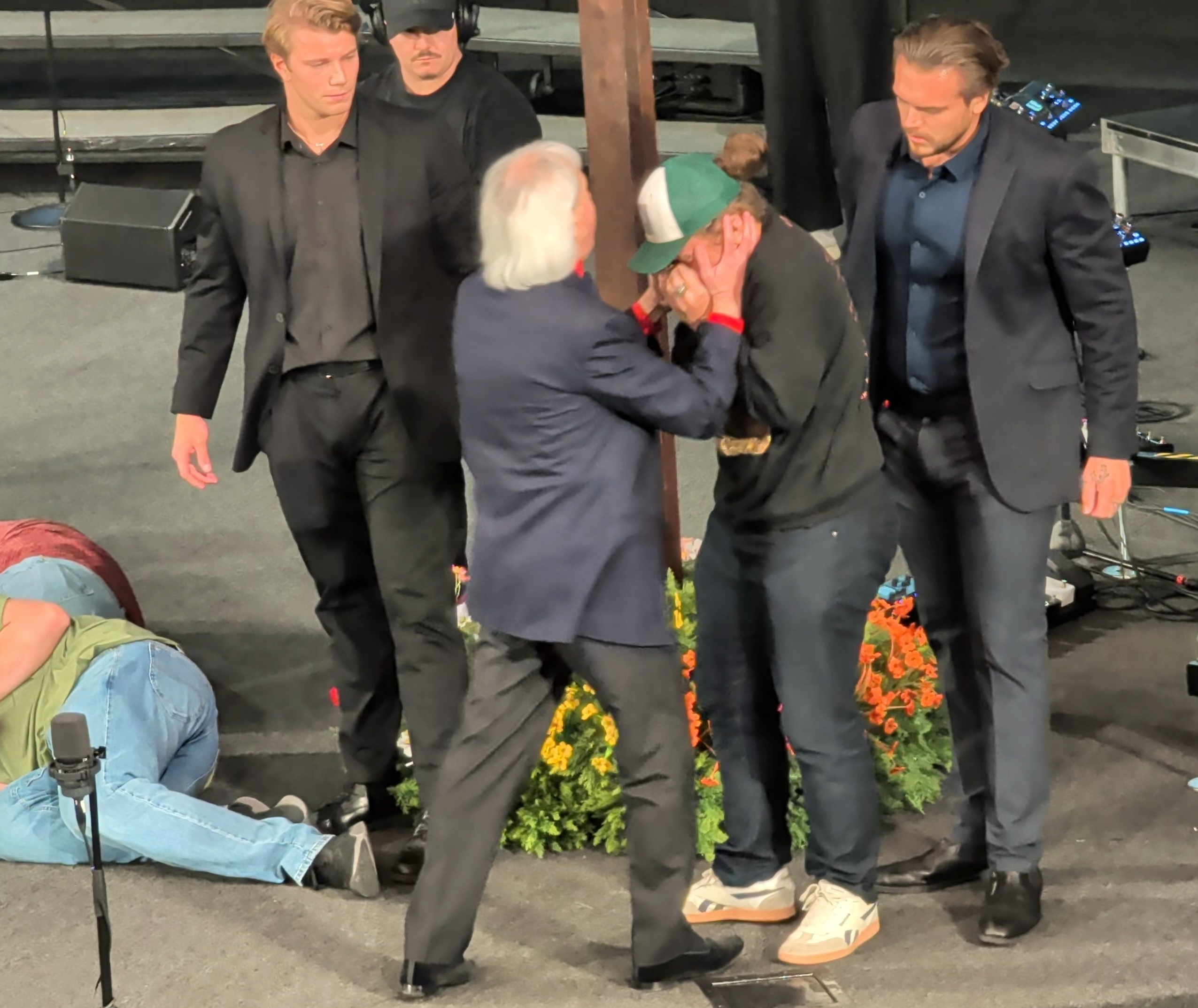
Benny Hinn places his hands on an attendee during a sermon

In 1987, the family of 85-year-old Ella Peppard filed a $5 million lawsuit against Hinn, Benny Hinn Ministries, and Faith Tabernacle Association following Peppard's death. According to The Washington Post, Peppard had attended a healing service in Oklahoma City when another attendee, whom Hinn had struck on the forehead, fell backward into her and fractured her hip. Peppard died 15 days later. Her family alleged that Hinn and those operating the service failed to provide or summon medical assistance after the injury. Church officials denied that allegation and said that Peppard had declined treatment.

=== A Question of Miracles ===
In April 2001, HBO aired the documentary A Question of Miracles, that examined healing claims made by Hinn and evangelist Reinhard Bonnke. Both Hinn and Bonnke offered full access to their events to the documentary crew, and the documentary team followed seven cases of reputed miracle healings from Hinn's crusade over the next year. Director Antony Thomas later told CNN's Kyra Phillips that they could not verify any of the healings they investigated. Thomas said in a New York Times interview that "If I had seen miracles [from Hinn's ministry], I would have been happy to trumpet it ... but in retrospect, I think they do more damage to Christianity than the most committed atheist."

=== "Do You Believe in Miracles?" ===
In November 2004, the CBC Television show The Fifth Estate broadcast and investigation titled "Do You Believe in Miracles?" on the apparent transgressions committed by Hinn's ministry.

With the aid of hidden cameras and crusade witnesses, the producers of the show demonstrated Hinn's apparent misappropriation of funds, his fabrication of the truth, and the way in which his staff chose crusade audience members to come on stage to proclaim their miracle healings. In particular, the investigation reported that attendees with visible severe disabilities are not allowed on stage; those who attempt to be in the line of possible healings are intercepted and directed to return to their seats.

At one service, hidden cameras recorded a mother carrying her daughter, Grace, who has muscular dystrophy, attempting to enter the healing line. Staff asked the mother whether Grace had already been healed and directed the pair back to their seats after being told that she had not.

Evangelist Justin Peters, who has cerebral palsy and had studied Hinn's ministry, also attempted to enter the stage line during a Toronto service. Peters was quickly intercepted as he came out of the wheelchair section in an attempt to join the line of those waiting to go onstage and was told to take a seat.

=== Ministry Watch issues "Donor Alert" ===
In March 2005, Ministry Watch issued a Donor Alert against the ministry, citing a lack of financial transparency among other possible problems. Benny Hinn Ministries is not a member of the Evangelical Council for Financial Accountability.

=== Senate investigation ===
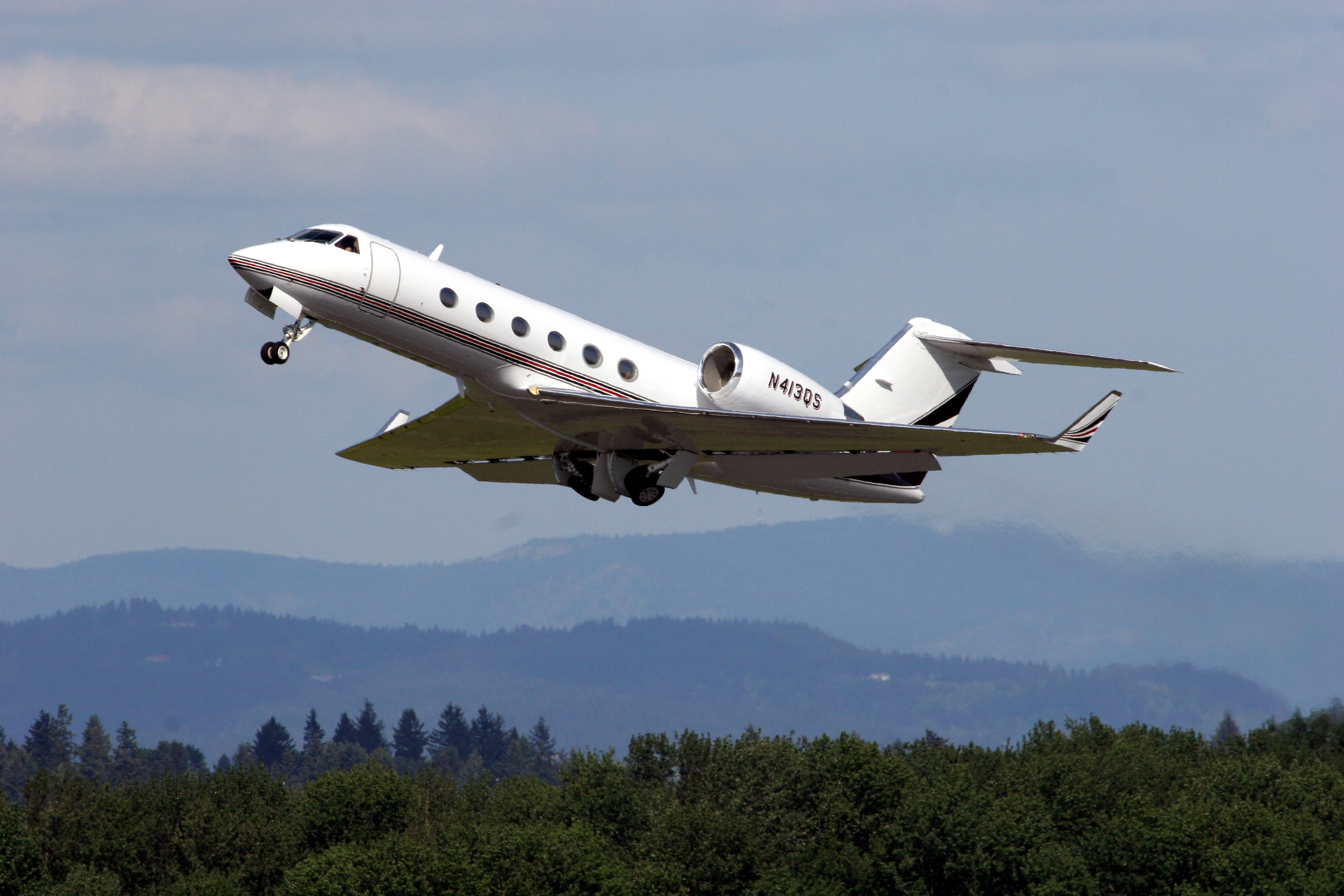
Critics accuse Hinn of using the ministry's Gulfstream G4SP jet for personal vacations funded by tax-free donations.

In 2007, United States Senator Chuck Grassley announced that the United States Senate Committee on Finance would investigate Hinn's ministry. In a letter to BHM, Grassley asked for the ministry to divulge financial information to the Senate Committee on Finance to determine if Hinn made any personal profit from financial donations and requested that Hinn's ministry make the information available. The investigation also scrutinized five other televangelists: Paula White, Kenneth Copeland, Eddie L. Long, Joyce Meyer, and Creflo Dollar. In December 2007, Hinn said he would not respond to the inquiry until 2008. The ministry subsequently responded to the inquiry, and Grassley said that "Benny Hinn [has] engaged in open and honest dialogue with committee staff. They have not only provided responses to every question but, in the spirit of true cooperation, also have provided information over and above what was requested."

The investigation concluded in 2011 with no penalties or findings of wrongdoing. The final report raised questions about personal use of church-owned luxury goods and a lack of financial oversight on the ministries' boards, which are often populated with family and friends of the televangelist. Hinn's group reported to the committee that it complied with tax regulations and had made changes in compensation and governance procedures.

=== Prosperity theology ===
In 2017, Pastor Costi Hinn, a nephew of Hinn, came forward with a testimony of his time spent in Hinn's ministry and what made him leave. In the testimony, Costi Hinn described the expensive cars and lavish houses that he and his family members owned and the luxury that surrounded their travel. Costi Hinn criticized the prosperity gospel and teachings of his uncle, writing, among other things, that healings only seemed to work in the crusades, where music created an atmosphere, and that many of their prophecies contradicted the Bible. He has since written a book on the topic titled God, Greed, and the (Prosperity) Gospel. In the book, Costi Hinn calls the prosperity gospel "damning and abusive", exploitative of the poor and vulnerable, and "arguably the most hateful and abusive kind of false teaching plaguing the church today".

In September 2019, he said that Benny Hinn no longer believed in prosperity theology and decided to stop teaching it.

== Personal life ==
Hinn married Suzanne Harthern on 4 August 1979. The couple have four children. She filed divorce papers in California's Orange County Superior Court on 1 February 2010, citing "irreconcilable differences".

In July 2010, Hinn and fellow televangelist Paula White were photographed leaving a hotel in Rome holding hands. Both Hinn and White denied allegations in the National Enquirer that the two were engaged in an affair. Hinn was sued in February 2011 by the Christian publishing house Strang Communications, which claimed that a relationship with White did occur and that Hinn had violated the morality clause of his contract with the company.

In May 2012, Hinn announced that he and Suzanne had begun reconciliation during the Christmas season of 2011, stating that the split had been caused by her addiction to prescription drugs and antidepressants and citing his busy schedule and lack of time for his wife and children. Benny and Suzanne remarried on 3 March 2013, at the Holy Land Experience theme park, in a traditional ceremony lasting over two hours and attended by approximately 1,000 well-wishers, including many visiting Christian leaders. Jack Hayford referred to the remarriage as "a miracle of God's grace". However, in July 2024, Suzanne would once again file for divorce, this time in the Hillsborough County Court in Tampa, Florida. The divorce was finalized on 19 November 2025.

== Published works ==
- Hinn, Benny (1990). Good Morning, Holy Spirit. Thomas Nelson. ISBN 0-8407-3181-7.
- Hinn, Benny (1992). The Anointing. Thomas Nelson. ISBN 0-8407-7699-3.
- Hinn, Benny (1993). Lord, I Need a Miracle. Nashville, Tennessee: Thomas Nelson. ISBN 0-8407-6251-8.
- Hinn, Benny (1993). The Blood. Lake Mary, Florida: Creation House. ISBN 0-88419-346-2.
- Hinn, Benny (1995). Welcome, Holy Spirit: How You Can Experience the Dynamic Work of the Holy Spirit in Your Life. Thomas Nelson. ISBN 0-7852-7982-2.
- Hinn, Benny (1996). This Is Your Day for a Miracle. Orlando, Florida: Creation House. ISBN 0-88419-391-8.
- Hinn, Benny (October 1996). The Biblical Road to Blessing. Nashville, Tennessee: Thomas Nelson. ISBN 0-7852-7517-7.
- Hinn, Benny (1998). Miracle of Healing. Nashville, Tennessee: J. Countryman. ISBN 0-8499-5399-5.
- Hinn, Benny (1999). Kathryn Kuhlman: Her Spiritual Legacy and Its Impact on My Life. Thomas Nelson. ISBN 0-7852-7888-5.
- Hinn, Benny (1999). He Touched Me: An Autobiography. Thomas Nelson. ISBN 0-7852-7887-7.
- Hinn, Benny (2002). Going Deeper with the Holy Spirit. Benny Hinn Ministries. ISBN 1-59024-039-1.
- Hinn, Benny (5 July 2005). Total Recovery: Supernatural Restoration and Release. Dallas, Texas: Clarion Call Marketing. ISBN 1-59574-038-4.

== See also ==
- Charismatic movement
- Kathryn Kuhlman
- List of television evangelists
- Prosperity theology
- Televangelism
- Word of Faith
- John Bevere
