= Jesus Image =

Coordinates: 28.6269°N 81.4124°W

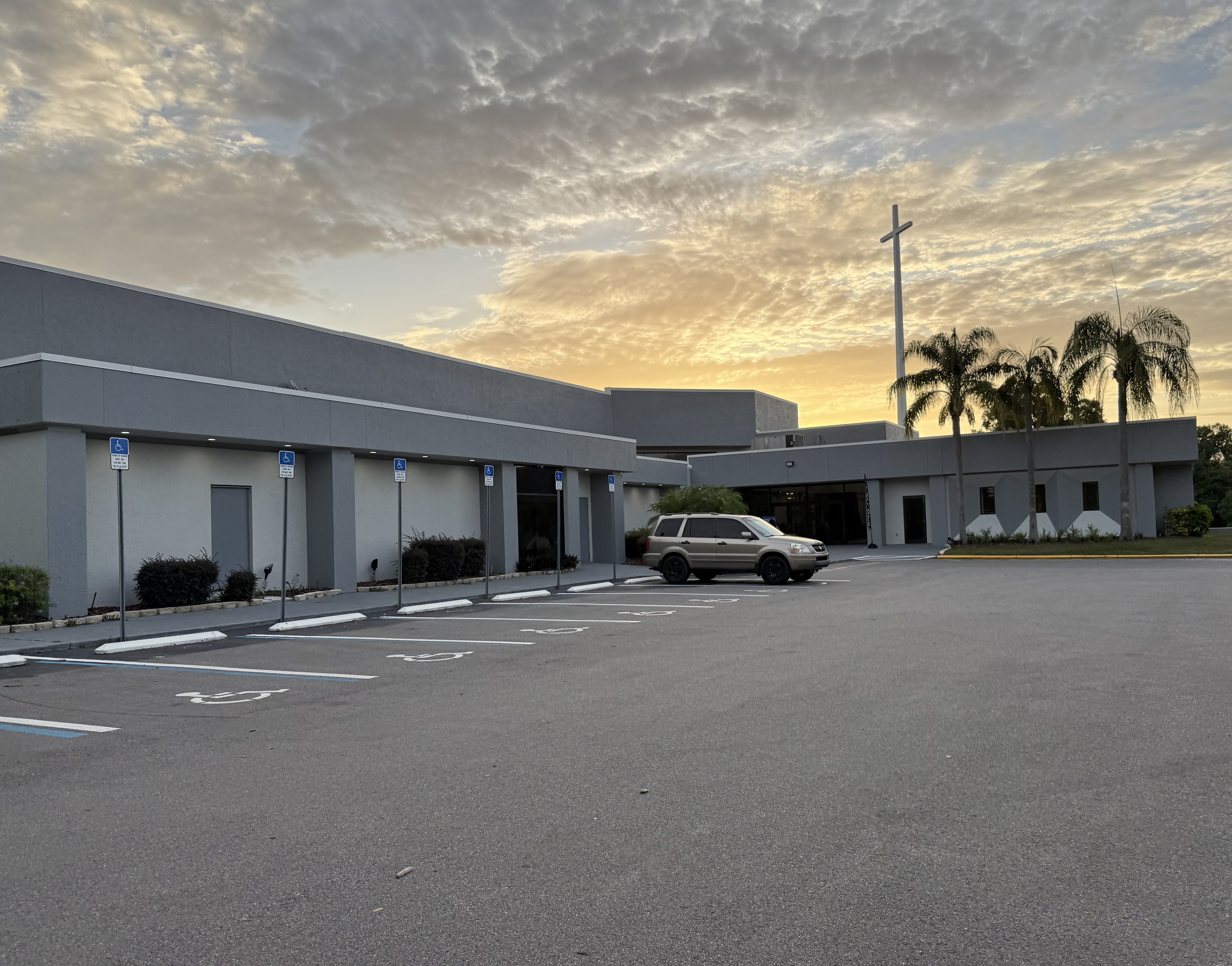
- Jesus Image
- Location: Orlando, Florida
- Country: United States
- Denomination: Nondenominational, charismatic, Pentecostal
- Website: jesusimage.tv

History
- Founded: 2007
- Founder(s): Michael and Jessica Koulianos

Jesus Image is an American charismatic, non-denominational Christian ministry and church based in Orlando, Florida. Established in 2007 by Michael Koulianos and his wife Jessica, the organization comprises a local church, a ministry training program called Jesus School, and regular worship and conference events. It is known for its practices such as faith-healing, prophecy, and revival-themed events, all of which are common practices in charismatic Christianity. Jesus Image has been criticized for its theological views and leadership culture.

== History ==
Jesus Image was founded in 2007 by evangelist Michael Koulianos, initially as an itinerant ministry.

In 2018, the organization launched a ministry training program, which it calls Jesus School. That same year, the ministry began holding weekly services in Orlando called Jesus Nights, which Koulianos later described as the beginning of Jesus Image Church.

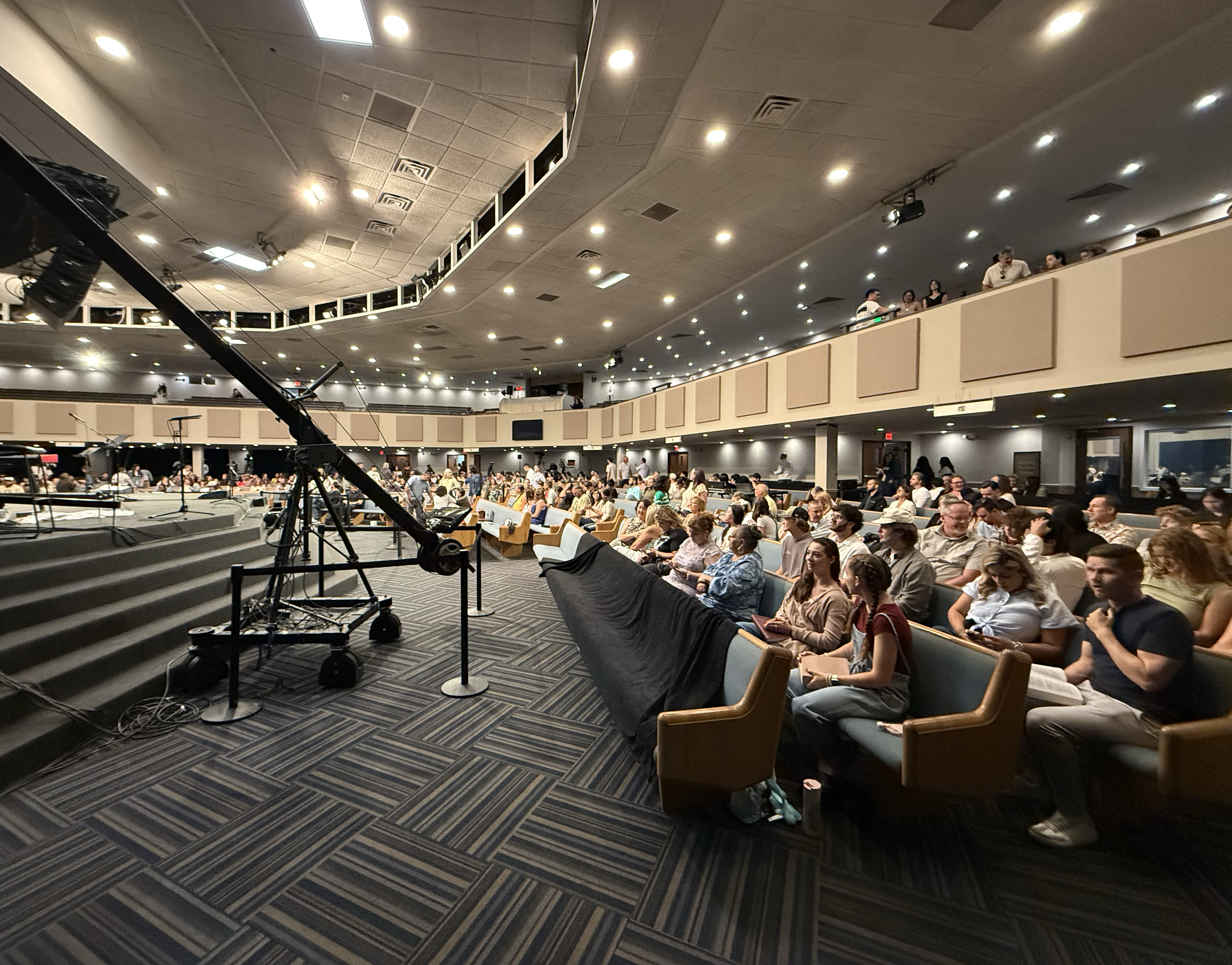
Congregants gather for a service inside the main sanctuary of Jesus Image.

In late 2021, Jesus Image launched a capital campaign called Build His House. The campaign is intended to fund the construction of a permanent facility in Orlando to house the church, Jesus School, and other ministry activities. However, both the construction plans and funding goals have shifted substantially since the inception of the campaign, with most changes coming in the form of notable increases to the fundraising target.

== Events and conferences ==
=== Regular Services ===
Jesus Image holds weekly services at its Orlando facility, along with occasional midweek worship events known as "Jesus Nights." Services are streamed online through platforms such as YouTube. Students from Jesus School are required to attend service.

=== Jesus Conference ===
Jesus Conference is a recurring Christian conference organized by the ministry in Orlando. It began in 2014 in Orlando. The 2018 conference included Benny Hinn, Heidi Baker, Daniel Kolenda, Todd White and Claudio Freidzon, among others, while the 2019 event included Freidzon and worship leaders Jeremy Riddle and Steffany Gretzinger.

=== Pastors and Leaders Conference ===
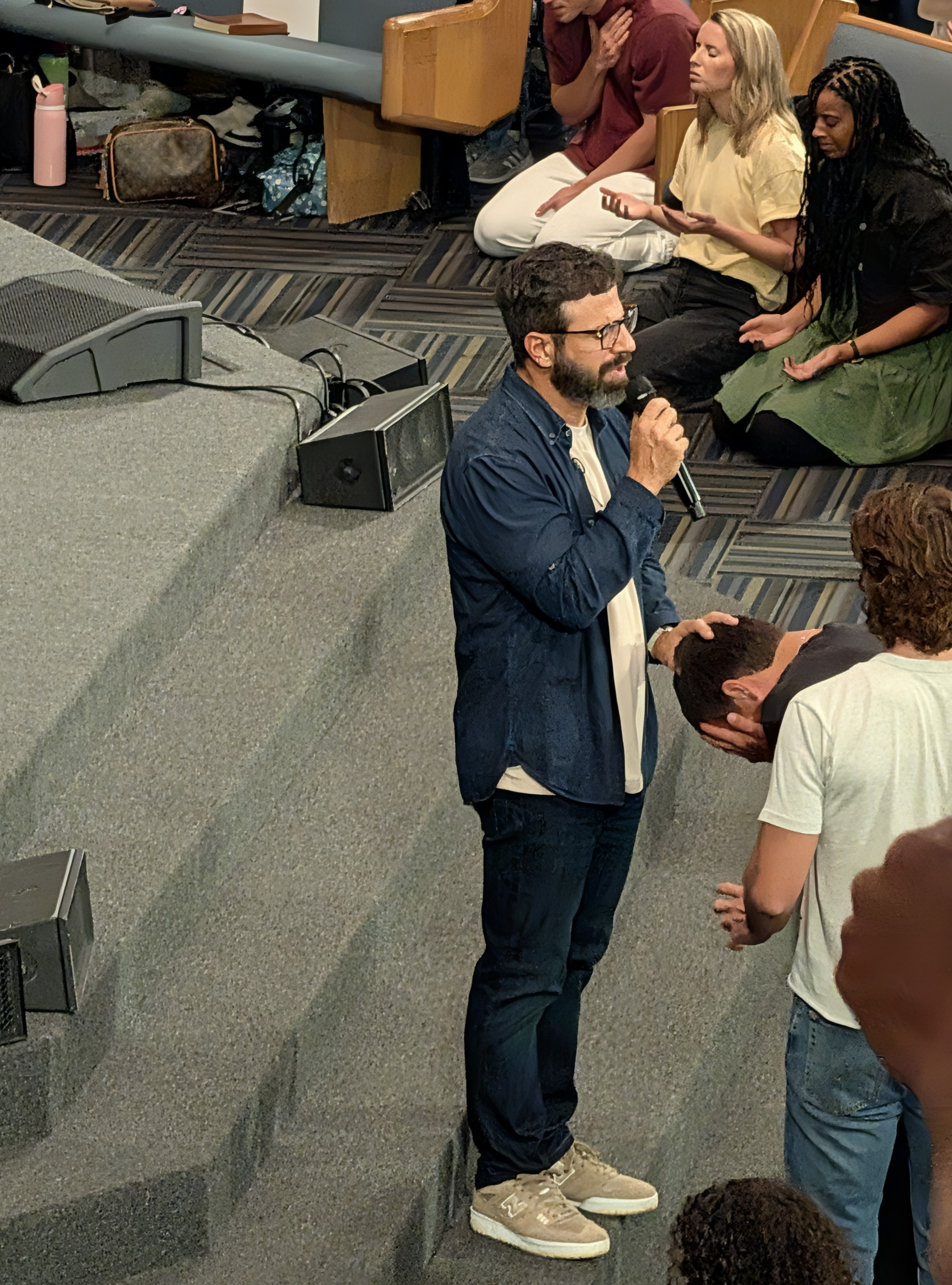
Michael Koulianos prays for an attendee during a service at Jesus Image Church.

Jesus Image holds a annual conference for pastors and Leaders. The 2023 event was held in Orlando, and included Michael Koulianos, Benny Hinn, Francis Chan, and Michael Miller. The 2025 conference was held in San Diego.

=== The Send ===
Jesus Image was one of the ministries involved in organizing The Send, an evangelistic movement that held its first stadium gathering at Camping World Stadium in Orlando on February 23, 2019. Michael Koulianos was among the event's participating ministry leaders. Charisma News reported that approximately 59,000 people attended the gathering.

CBN described The Send as a collaboration of Christian ministries intended to encourage participants to become involved in evangelism.

== Jesus School ==
Jesus Image established Jesus School in 2018 as a ministry training program. The program began with 72 students. Its curriculum includes courses on theology, worship, evangelism, and ministry, along with domestic and International missions opportunities.

Jesus School is not accredited and does not award academic degrees. Students who complete two years of its Track 2 program may receive transfer credit at universities such as Regent University through articulation agreements.

Jesus School is led by Jessica and Michael Koulianos and has had guest instructors including Benny Hinn and Steffany Gretzinger.

== Leadership ==
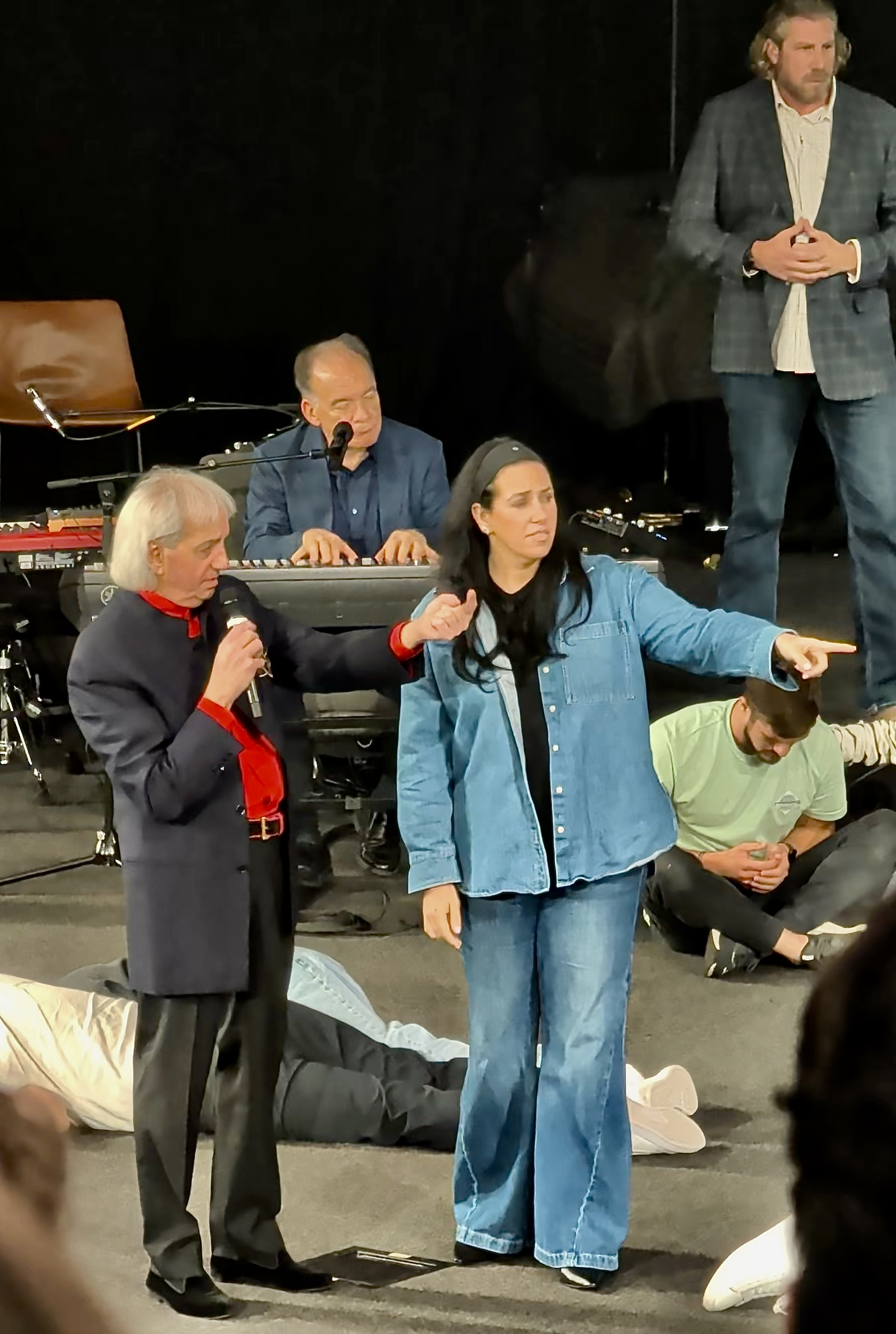
Jessica Koulianos with her father, Benny Hinn, during a service at Jesus Image Church.

=== Michael Koulianos ===
Michael Koulianos is the founder and senior pastor of Jesus Image. Before establishing the ministry, he was ordained and served as the lead pastor of World Healing Center Church, Inc. World Healing Center Church is the corporation operating as Benny Hinn Ministries. Koulianos is also the author of several books including The Jesus Book and Holy Spirit: The One Who Makes Jesus Real.

=== Jessica Koulianos ===
Jessica Koulianos co-founded Jesus Image with her husband, Michael, and is the director of Jesus School. She is the daughter of controversial televangelist Benny Hinn.

== Controversy and criticism ==
=== Copyright Dispute ===
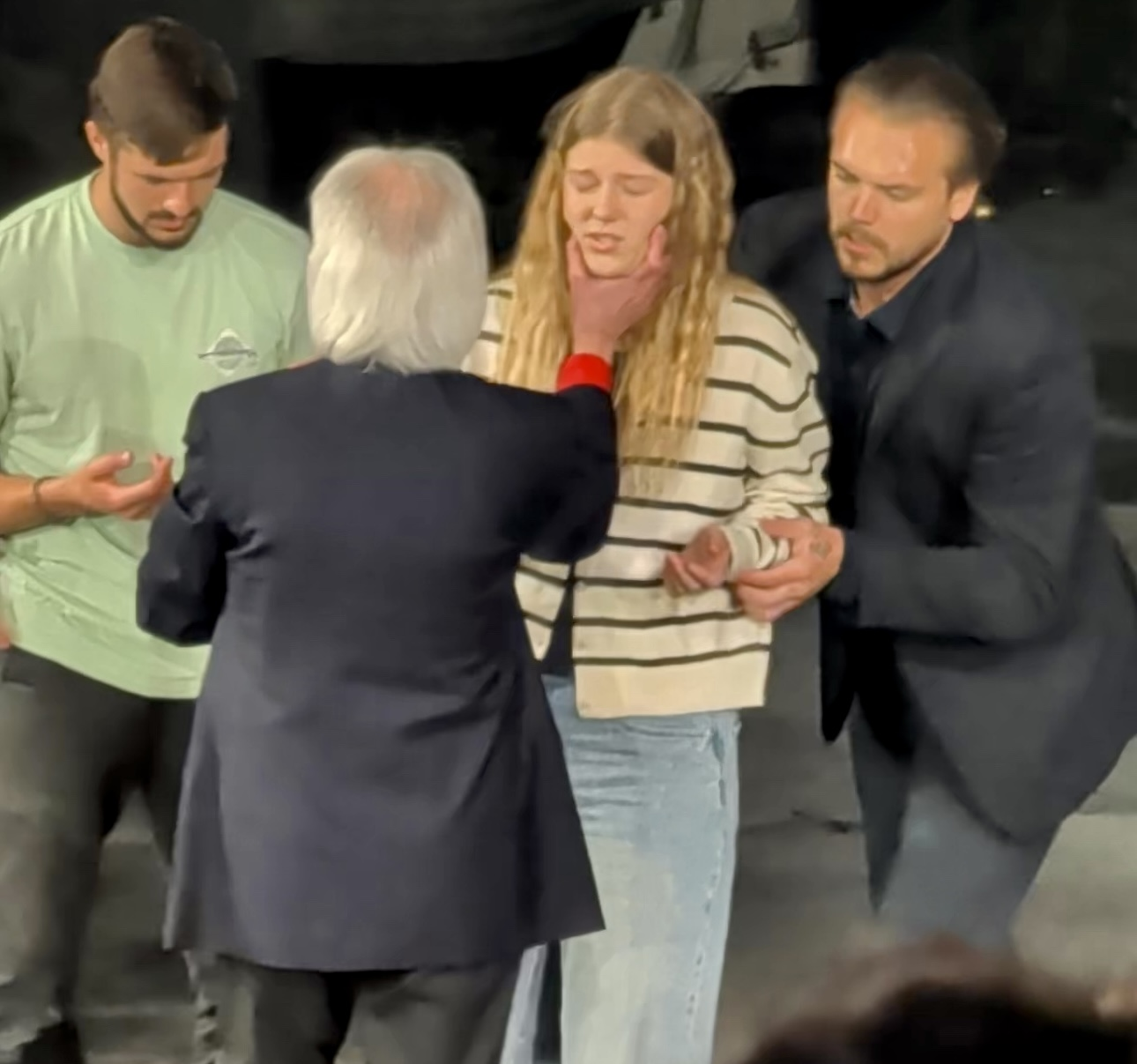
Benny Hinn places his hand on an attendee's face during a service at Jesus Image Church (2025).

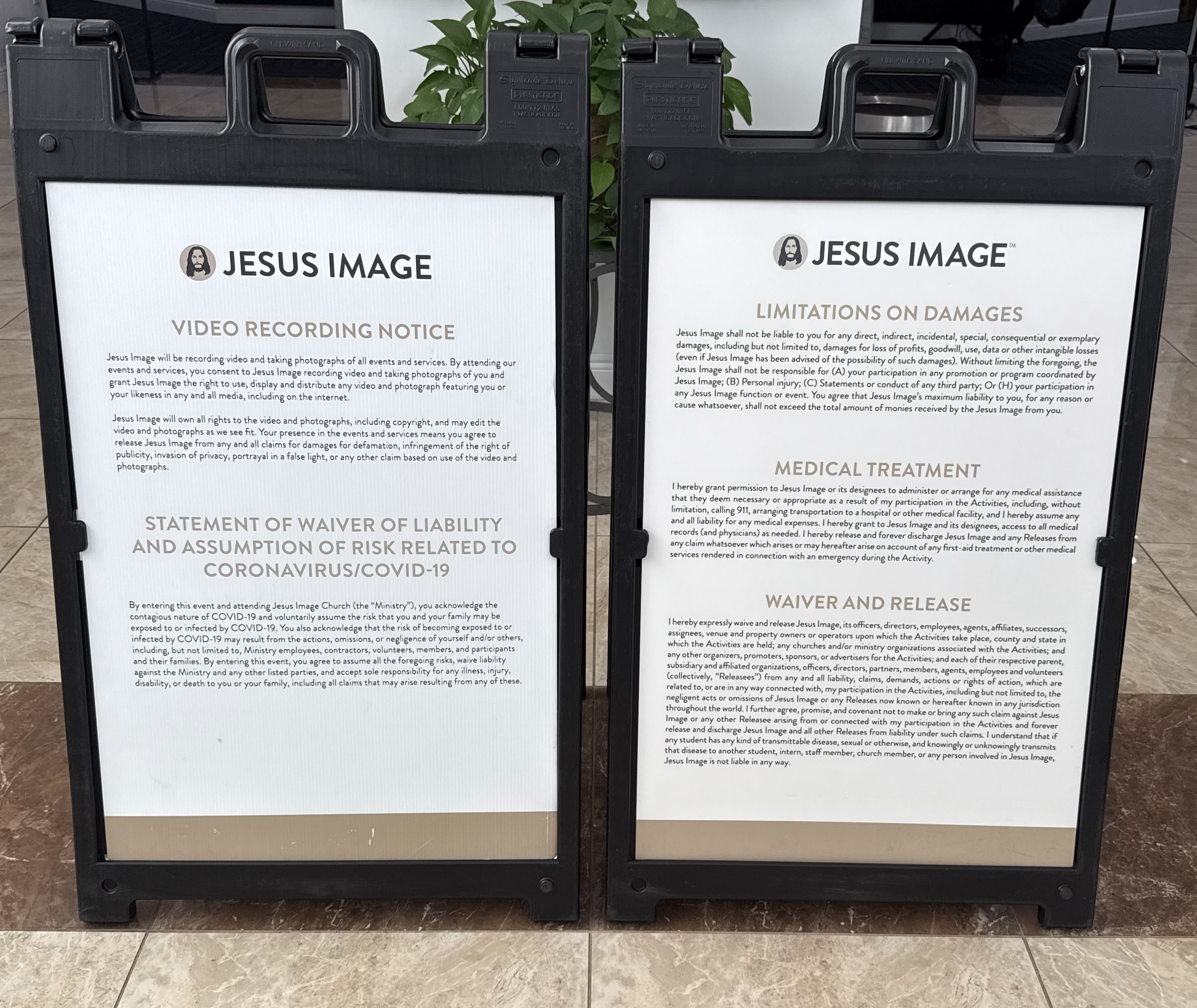
Sign posted in the lobby of Jesus Image Church outlining attendee consent, liability disclaimers, and media usage rights. It includes a clause that specifically references sexually transmitted diseases, stating that Jesus Image holds no responsibility if one attendee transmits such a condition to another.

In April 2024, pastor and YouTuber Mike Winger said that Jesus Image had made a copyright claim against his video titled The Problem with Benny Hinn, which criticized Hinn's ministry. Jesus Image later claimed that the claim had been generated automatically by YouTube and that the ministry withdrew it after becoming aware of it. Winger disputed that explanation, saying that he believed a third-party copyright service had submitted the claim.

=== Leadership culture ===
In February 2026, former Jesus Image member Joe Pasinski published an open letter criticizing the ministry's leadership culture. Pasinski said that he and his family had been involved with Jesus Image and Jesus School since 2018 and that his wife had served on staff at Jesus School.

Pasinski alleged that the ministry's emphasis on "honor" toward leadership discouraged disagreement and that members who questioned leaders feared being labeled disloyal or isolated from the community. He also alleged that some members feared retaliation or possible legal consequences for speaking critically about the ministry. In his letter, he called for an independent review of the ministry, for Michael and Jessica Koulianos to temporarily step aside during the review, and for the establishment of a representative elder board.

=== Jesus School ===
In August 2026, The Remnant Radio criticized teaching about spiritual authority that one of its hosts said had been reported to him by multiple people who attended Jesus School classes. The host said that he had received reports that Michael or Jessica Koulianos told students a story about a person who intended to testify against Benny Hinn in court, but died the night before he was supposed to do so, which he said was presented as a warning against speaking against an "anointed" leader. He went on to describe the teaching as a fear tactic designed to discourage criticism of church leadership, specifically Michael and Jessica Koulianos.

== Facilities and expansion ==
Jesus Image currently holds its weekly services and operated Jesus School at 7601 Forest City Road in Orlando, Florida. The property was previously used by organizations associated with Benny Hinn. As of 2026, Jesus Image does not own the facility and is instead operating services from the location under a lease arrangement. To support larger public events, Jesus Image rents high-capacity venues such as the Addition Financial Arena in Orlando, which seats over 9,000 attendees.

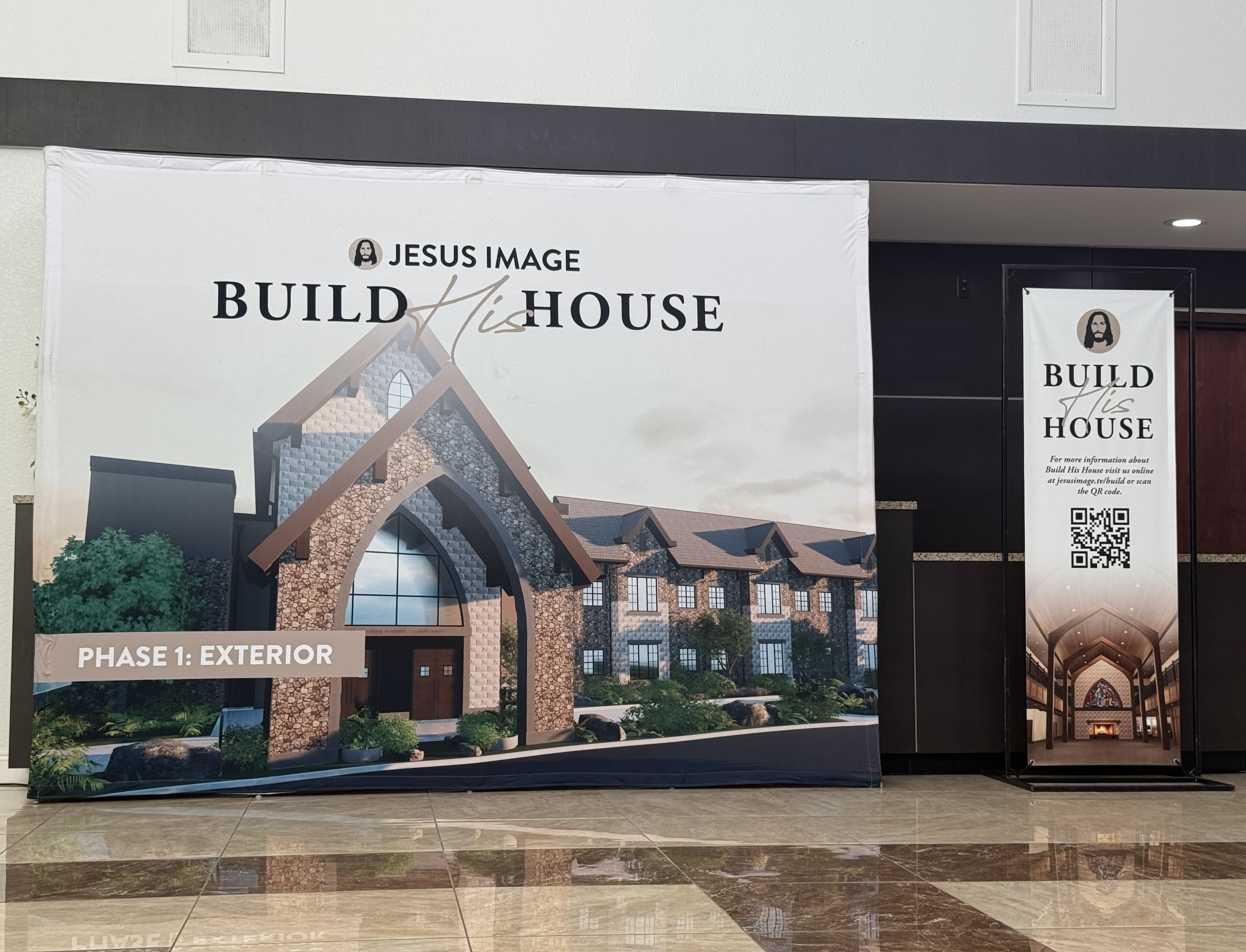
Lobby display promoting the Build His House campaign at Jesus Image Church.

Jesus Image is constructing a permanent church facility in Sanford, Florida. As part of this expansion, Jesus Image launched the Build His House fundraising initiative.

Starting in April 2024, the ministry introduced its initial fundraising goal of $22 million for “Phase 1” of the project. This phase would initially consist of a 56,000-square-foot facility for the church and Jesus School, a sanctuary and lobby, and space for Jesus Kids and Jesus School. From April 2024 to March 2026, Jesus Image incrementally raised its “Phase 1” funding goal from $22 million to $30 million, while the projected square footage also fluctuated during that period. In April 2024, the ministry’s website added a “Phase 2” goal with an estimated cost of $16 million. All references to “Phase 2” were later removed from the website in July 2025.
