= Live, Laugh, Love (disambiguation) =

Live, Laugh, Love is an inspirational phrase.

Live, Laugh, Love may also refer to:

== Music ==
- "Live, Laugh, Love," a pastiche song from Stephen Sondheim's 1971 musical Follies
- Live, Laugh, Love (Clay Walker album), 1999
  - "Live, Laugh, Love" (song), the title track off of Walker's album
- Live Laugh Love (EP), a 2010 EP by Urma Sellinger
- Live Laugh Love (Chastity Belt album), 2024
- Live Laugh Love (Earl Sweatshirt album), 2025

== Other media ==
- Live Laugh Love: The Secret History of White Christian Women and the World They Made a book by Kristin Kobes Du Mez
- Love, Live and Laugh, a 1929 American drama film
- "...lived well, laughed often, and loved much", an excerpt from the 1904 poem Success by Bessie Anderson Stanley

== Other uses ==
- The Live Love Laugh Foundation, an Indian organization that deals with mental health issues

== See also ==
- Live, Love, Larf & Loaf, a 1987 album by French Frith Kaiser Thompson
- Love, Life and Laughter (disambiguation)
