= Religious views on same-sex marriage =

Religious Institutions hold varying views on same-sex marriage. Arguments both for and against same-sex marriage are often made on religious grounds and/or formulated in terms of religious doctrine. Although many of the world's religions are opposed to same-sex marriage, the number of religious denominations that are conducting same-sex marriages has increased since 2010. Religious views on same-sex marriage are closely related to religious views on homosexuality.

== Religious support ==
=== Buddhism ===
Due to the ambivalent language about homosexuality in Buddhist teachings, there has been no official stance put forth regarding the issue of marriage between members of the same gender. There is no official Buddhist position on the issue of same-sex marriage.

In 1997, the Dalai Lama said, "We have to make a distinction between believers and unbelievers, [...] From a Buddhist point of view, men-to-men and women-to-women is generally considered sexual misconduct. [...] From society's viewpoint, mutually agreeable homosexual relations can be of mutual benefit, enjoyable and harmless."

On October 11, 1995, some religious leaders gave testimony to the Commission on Sexual Orientation and the Law in support of same-gender marriages. Robert Aitken, co-founder and teacher of the Honolulu Diamond Sangha, a Zen Buddhist society established in 1959, with centers in Manoa and Palolo, gave written testimony on the subject of same-sex marriage. Aitken explains that by applying the Four Noble Abodes (loving kindness, compassion, joy in the attainment of others, and equanimity) to the issue of same-sex marriage, he finds compassion for and with the gay or lesbian couple who wish to confirm their love in a legal marriage. Aitken cites a precept about sex which Zen Buddhists inherit from earlier classical Buddhists teachings.

It is one of the sixteen precepts accepted by all Zen Buddhist monks, nuns and seriously committed lay people. He understands this to mean that self-centred sexual conduct is inappropriate, and he vows to avoid it. He believes that self-centred sex is exploitive sex, non-consensual sex, sex that harms others. It is unwholesome and destructive in a heterosexual as well as in a homosexual context. He goes on to explain that The Legislative Reference Bureau compiled a formidable list of rights that are extended to married couples in Hawai'i, but which are denied to couples who are gay and lesbian.

He argued in 2021 that gay and lesbian unions would be "settled even more" if they were acknowledged with basic married rights. Aitken says, "A long-standing injustice would be corrected, and the entire gay and lesbian community would feel more accepted. This would stabilize a significant segment of our society, and we would all of us be better able to acknowledge our diversity. I urge you to advise the Legislature and the people of Hawai'i that legalizing gay and lesbian marriages will be humane and in keeping with perennial principles of decency and mutual encouragement."

=== Christianity ===
Support and affirmation of marriage rights for same-sex couples generally comes from certain Christian denominations that are considered theologically liberal. Some examples of religious organizations voicing their support for same-sex marriage include the:

- Metropolitan Community Church
- United Church of Christ
- United Church of Canada
- Christian Church (Disciples of Christ)
- Episcopal Church of the United States
- Anglican Church of Canada,
- Evangelical Lutheran Church In America,
- the Evangelical Lutheran Church in Canada,
- Church of Denmark (including the Church of Greenland),
- Evangelical Lutheran Church of Finland,
- Church of Sweden,
- Church of Norway,
- Protestant Church in the Netherlands,
- United Protestant Church of France,
- United Protestant Church in Belgium,
- Icelandic Church,
- Swiss Reformed Church,
- Protestant Church in Baden,
- Evangelical Lutheran Church in Bavaria,
- Evangelical Church in Berlin, Brandenburg and Silesian Upper Lusatia,
- Bremen Evangelical Church,
- Evangelical Lutheran Church in Brunswick,
- Evangelical-Lutheran Church of Hanover,
- Protestant Church in Hesse and Nassau,
- Evangelical Church of Hesse Electorate-Waldeck,
- Church of Lippe,
- Evangelical Church in Central Germany,
- Evangelical Lutheran Church in Northern Germany,
- Evangelical Lutheran Church in Oldenburg,
- Evangelical Church of the Palatinate,
- Evangelical Reformed Church (Germany),
- Evangelical Church in the Rhineland,
- Evangelical-Lutheran Church of Saxony,
- Evangelical Church of Westphalia,
- Presbyterian Church (U.S.A.),
- Methodist Church of Great Britain,
- Scottish Episcopal Church, Quakers,
- Old Catholic Church
- Quakers
- United Methodist Church,
- Unitarian Universalists church.

There are progressive congregations within mainline Christian denominations, such as More Light Presbyterians, and Dignity USA that voice support for same-sex marriage.

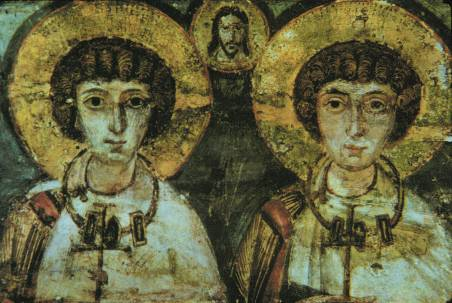
Historian John Boswell claims the 4th century Christian martyrs Saint Sergius and Saint Bacchus were united in the rite of adelphopoesis, or brother-making, which he calls an early form of religious same-sex marriage.

=== United Church of Canada ===
The United Church of Canada (600,000 members) was active in the campaign that led to legal recognition of same-sex marriages in Canada. The United Church of Canada now allows individual congregations to decide whether or not to perform these marriages. Likewise, in the Protestant Church of the Netherlands, where same-sex marriages have been legal since 2001, individual congregations decide if they will perform these marriages.

In 2000, United Church of Canada, in its 37th General Council said, "human sexual orientations, whether heterosexual, bisexual or homosexual, are a gift from God." In 2003, the Church called for the federal government to create a civil framework that treated heterosexual and same sex couples equally.

==== Episcopal Church of the United States ====
The Episcopal Church (as of 2015: 7,115 open parishes and missions; 2,009,084 active baptized members) at their 2009 General Convention declared that: "bishops, particularly those in dioceses within civil jurisdictions where same-gender marriage, civil unions, or domestic partnerships are legal, may provide generous pastoral response to meet the needs of members of this Church." On July 9, 2012, the Episcopal Church passed a resolution that was to be voted on later to approve an official liturgy for blessing same-sex unions. This liturgy, called "The Witnessing and Blessing of a Lifelong Covenant," would enable priests to bestow the church's blessing on same-sex couples; priests could refuse to perform marriages, and bishops could prohibit same-sex marriage in their diocese. Denial would come without penalty, but the priest or diocese would have to direct same-sex couples they decline to another church or priest willing to perform the ceremony. The resolution was confirmed on July 9, 2015 (three years later) on a 129 for and 26 against (with 5 abstaining) vote.

===== United Methodist Church =====
The United Methodist Church did not permit same-sex marriage or the ordination of LGBT people until May 2024. At the 2024 General Conference, 93% of delegates voted to lift existing bans on the ordination of LGBTQ+ people, and the hosting of same-sex marriages. The General Conference removed restrictions and created a series of affirmations and agreements treating all persons with respect regarding their gender identity and sexual orientation.

=== Metropolitan Community Church ===
The Metropolitan Community Church (43,000 members) sees its mission being social as well as spiritual by standing up for the rights of minorities, particularly those of lesbian, gay, bisexual, and transgender people. MCC has been a leading force in the development of Queer theology. As such, the MCC is notable for publicly supporting same-sex marriage as early as the 1960s. Notably in 1970 Troy Perry, the church's founder, filed the first lawsuit in the U.S. seeking legal recognition for same-sex marriages. Perry lost that lawsuit but launched the debate over same-sex marriage in the U.S. Today, MCC congregations around the world perform more than 6000 same-sex marriage ceremonies annually.

==== Presbyterian Church USA ====
The Presbyterian Church USA General Assembly Permanent Judicial Commission ruled in 2006 that same-sex ceremonies are not forbidden, as long as they are not considered to be the same as marriage services. Debate on the issue within the church evolved over the years. In 2000, the General Assembly had approved language for the church constitution that stated church teachings were that people were "to live either in fidelity within the covenant of marriage between a man and a woman or in chastity in singleness.," and barred church officers and property from being used for blessing or approval upon any other form of fidelity relationship, but ratification for this language was never obtained by the presbyteries. By 2014, the General Assembly passed an Authoritative Interpretation permitting pastors to sign marriage licences for same-gender couples where permitted by civil law in the states where their church was found, which took immediate effect.

On March 17, 2015, ratification by a majority of presbyteries was reached on a constitutional amendment passed by that same 2014 General Assembly, which broadened the definition of marriage in the Directory for Worship from only being between "a man and a woman," to "two people, traditionally a man and a woman," thus giving official sanction to, while not making it mandatory for, any congregation's pastor to preside over and bless marriage ceremonies for same-gender couples.

==== United Church of Christ ====
The United Church of Christ's General Synod (998,906 members) passed a resolution affirming "equal marriage rights for all people regardless of gender" in 2005. The church allows but does not require pastors to perform same-sex weddings.

=== Christian biblical scholarship ===
According to Daniel A. Helminiak, the Bible may be interpreted literally or within historical-cultural context. More literal readings of the Bible condemn homosexuality (and, by extension, gay marriage). Read in cultural context, the Bible "was not addressing our current questions about sexual ethics and does not condemn gay sex [or gay marriage]s as we understand it today." Helminiak argues that Biblical passages said to be against homosexuality (and same-sex marriages) do not actually say anything against gay and lesbian sexual relationships or identity. "The sin of Sodom was inhospitality, not homosexuality. Jude condemns sex with angels, not sex between two men. Not a single Bible text indisputably refers to lesbian sex. [...] there follows no valid conclusion whatsoever about homosexuality. Biblical figures [...] may well have been involved in homogenital relationships, seen as part of God's plan. And Jesus himself said nothing at all about homosexuality, not even when face to face with a man in a gay relationship." It has been argued that the Bible was written for a world unlike our own, and that Monogamy, for example, only became the norm in the Christian world in the last 150 years or so. Lisa Miller also argues for a move beyond literalism. However, Miller argues that the Bible supports the idea of monogamous relationships, including gay marriage. Robin Kar argues that same-sex marriage is partly the result of certain religious and spiritual developments within Judeo-Christian society, which led to love-based marriages in the West. Hence, there are now religious reasons for Christians to support "transformative" marriage for all people and to dispense with the assumption that same-sex marriage reflects encroaching secularism.

==== Examples of support using biblical teachings ====
The Metropolitan Community Church, make the claim that the word "homosexual" as found in many modern versions of the Bible is an interpolation and is not found in the original biblical texts. This argument holds that since the original authors of the Bible never mention 'homosexuals' or committed Christian homosexual couples, there cannot exist a biblical prohibition of marriage rights for them. According to the MCC, biblical texts interpreted as references to homosexuality refer only to specific sex acts and idolatrous worship which lack relevance to contemporary same-sex relationships.

Christians who support religious and legal recognition of same-sex marriage may base their belief in same-sex marriage on the view that marriage, as an institution, and the structure of the family is a biblical moral imperative that should be honored by all couples, heterosexual and homosexual alike. Supporting same-sex marriage reflects their Christ-like commitment to the equality and dignity of all people.

=== Calls for equal treatment in public facilities ===
Some same-sex married couples have challenged religious organizations that exclude them from access to public facilities maintained by those organizations, such as schools, health care centers, social service agencies, summer camps, homeless shelters, nursing homes, orphanages, retreat houses, community centers, and athletic programs. Opponents of same-sex marriages have expressed concerns that this limits their religious freedoms. For example, conservatives worry that a Christian college would risk its tax-exempt status by refusing to admit a legally married gay couple to married-student housing. Some legal analysts suggest that failure to allow equal access within their organizations may cost some religious groups their tax-exempt status. In 2014 the U.S.Supreme Court ruled in Burwell v. Hobby Lobby Stores, Inc., 573 U.S. 682 that closely held corporations can have religious exemptions to federally mandated health care, such as contraception. Ruth Bader Ginsberg in her dissent thought that "religious liberty" could be used against other minorities.

Religious arguments for and against marriage rights for same-sex couples are not always evenly divided among theologically conservative religious groups and liberal groups. While self-identified theological liberal organizations such as the Religious Society of Friends (Quakers), support same-sex marriage, other more conservative and or orthodox organizations including some Mennonite churches, the Church of the Brethren, the Old Catholic Church, and the Church of Sweden also support marriage rights for gay and lesbian persons.

=== Unitarian Universalists and Unitarians ===
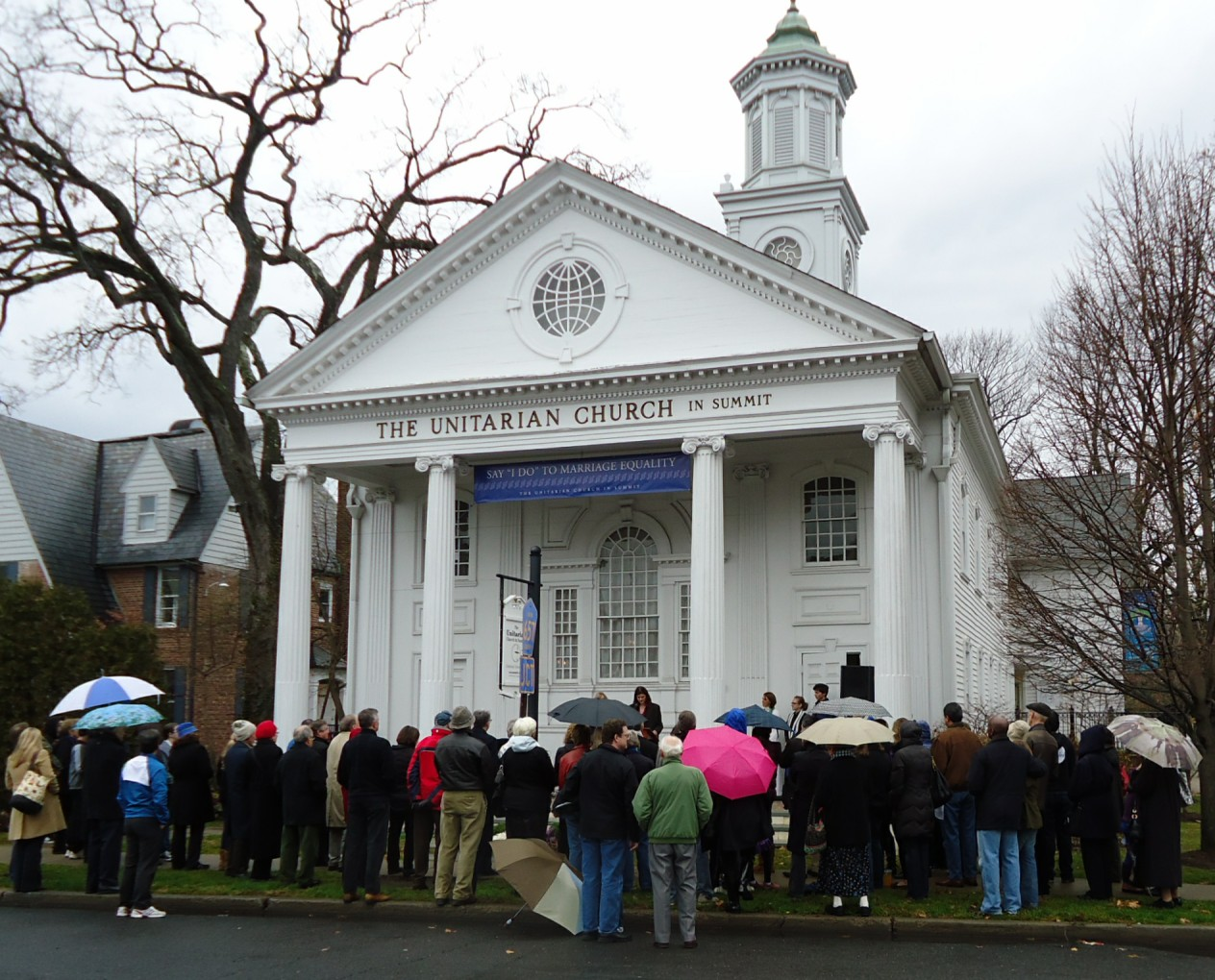
A rally at the Unitarian Church in Summit in New Jersey advocating same-sex marriage for same-sex couples in the state. The blue banner reads "Say 'I Do' to Marriage Equality".

At the 1996 United States Unitarian Universalist General Assembly, delegates voted overwhelmingly that they would perform same-sex marriage ceremonies, and the church has been performing weddings with and without state sanction ever since. Likewise Canadian Unitarian Universalist congregations perform same-sex marriages and the Canadian Unitarian Council their national organization supports this work through its Lay Chaplaincy program. Also the British Unitarian church is at the forefront of the campaign for same-sex marriage.

=== Hindus ===
There are both conservative and liberal views about homosexuality and same-sex marriages in Hinduism, similar to many other religions. A liberal view is presented by Mathematician Shakuntala Devi, in her 1977 book, The World of Homosexuals, in which she interviewed Srinivasa Raghavachariar, head priest of the Srirangam temple. He said that same-sex lovers must have been cross-sex lovers in a former life. The sex may change but the soul retains its attachments, hence the love impels these souls towards one another. In 2002, the academic Ruth Vanita interviewed a Shaiva priest who performed the marriage of two women; having studied Hindu scriptures, he had concluded, "Marriage is a union of spirits, and the spirit is not male or female" (p. 147).

As Amara Das Wilhelm, a Krishna devotee and founder of GALVA, notes in his book, Tritiya-Prakriti: People of the Third Sex, "several Gaudiya Vaishnava authorities emphasize that since everyone passes through various forms, genders and species in a series of lives, we should not judge each other by the material body but view everyone equally on a spiritual plane, and be compassionate as God is."

According to Ruth Vanita, "Indian newspapers, over the last 25 years, have reported several same-sex weddings and same-sex joint suicides, mostly by Hindu female couples in small towns, unconnected to any gay movement. Several weddings took place by Hindu rites, with some family support, while the suicides resulted from families forcibly separating lovers." According to Vanita, the phenomena of increased visibility of same-sex weddings "...suggest the wide range of Hindu attitudes to homosexuality today. The millennia-long debate in Hindu society, somewhat suppressed in the colonial period, has revived. In 2004, Hinduism Today reporter Rajiv Malik asked several Hindu swamis (teachers) their opinion of same-sex marriage. The swamis expressed a range of opinions, positive and negative. They felt free to differ with each other; this is evidence of the liveliness of the debate, made possible by the fact that Hinduism has no one hierarchy or leader. As Mahant Ram Puri remarked, "We do not have a rule book in Hinduism. We have a hundred million authorities."

=== Judaism ===
Members of Conservative Judaism and Reform Judaism support marriages for same-sex couples. The Jewish Reconstructionist Federation leaves the choice to individual rabbis.

=== Native American religion ===
Native American religions traditionally accepted same-sex marriage. This often came in the form of a Two-Spirit identity in which the Indigenous peoples of the Americas would fulfill one of many mixed gender roles.

=== Neopaganism ===
Neopagans are generally welcoming of LGBT people, and some strands celebrate gay relationships. Support is highest in Neo-Druidism, Wicca and Asatru. Some Wiccan groups perform handfastings and betrothals.

=== Views regarding Church-State separation ===
Many supporters of same sex marriages argue that, by defining the institution of marriage as between one man and one woman, the state automatically tramples upon the constitutional rights to freedom of religion. They argue that just because a majority of religious organizations may believe that gay marriages should not be granted by the state does not make it the state's obligation to observe their opinions on this matter.

The First Amendment to the United States Constitution, which is part of the United States Bill of Rights, expressly forbids laws being made "respecting an establishment of religion" and that prohibit the free exercise of religion. Thus, according to this argument, the state has no authority to define marriage as between one man and woman because there are various religions which hold that gay marriage is morally equivalent to heterosexual marriage.

Americans United for Separation of Church and State prominently expresses concern that heterosexual-only marriage laws impose a specific religious doctrine as state policy. According to them, "a marriage amendment in the Constitution [raises] important church-state and religious liberty concerns."

== Religious opposition ==
A large number of Christian groups have been vocal and politically active in opposing same-sex marriage laws in the United States. However, a 2020 study by the Public Religion Research Institute found most americans in major religious denominations supported same-sex marriage, with an estimated 70% of all US adults doing the same. Roman Catholic advocates of monogamous heterosexual marriages contend that same-sex relationships cannot be considered marriages because marriage, by definition, necessarily involves the uniting of two members of the opposite sex. Other religious arguments for an opposite-sex definition of marriage hold that same-sex relationships should not be recognized as marriages because same-gender sexual activity is contrary to God's will, is immoral, and subverts God's creative intent for human sexuality. Christian opposition to same-sex marriage also comes from the belief that same-sex marriage normalizes homosexual behavior and would encourage it, instead of encouraging resistance to same-sex attraction.

=== Christianity ===
Christian denominations and groups that have been vocal and or active in their opposition to same-sex marriages include the:

Assemblies of God (66.4 million members), Church of God in Christ (over 8 million members), the Conservative Congregational Christian Conference, the Rosedale Network of Churches, Convocation of Anglicans in North America, Hutterite Brethren, Brethren in Christ, Mennonite Church USA, Catholic Church (1.2 billion members), Russian Orthodox Church (150 million members), Seventh-day Adventist Church (17 million members), the Church of Jesus Christ of Latter-day Saints (LDS Church), Southern Baptist Convention (15.7 million members), and United Pentecostal Church International (2 million members). In 2009, a group of Christian leaders from various denominations issued the Manhattan Declaration, an "influential statement that united evangelicals and Catholic leaders in fighting abortion and gay marriage"; as of November 2010, the Declaration had been signed by over 475,000 individuals. On August 29, 2017, the Council on Biblical Manhood and Womanhood released a manifesto on human sexuality known as the "Nashville Statement". The statement was signed by 150 evangelical leaders, and includes 14 points of belief. Among other things, it states, "We deny that God has designed marriage to be a homosexual, polygamous, or polyamorous relationship."

==== Catholic Church opposition ====
According to Catholic moral doctrine, acts of sexual intimacy are only proper between a man and a woman within wedlock. Secular government recognition of any other union within the definition of "marriage" would therefore reflect a belief in the moral equivalence of acts between a husband and wife and acts between two men or two women; this belief is contrary to Catholic doctrinal teaching.

Catholic opponents also argue that inclusion of same-sex unions within the definition of marriage would also evidence rejection of the idea that, in general, it is best that children be raised by their biological mother and father, and that it is the community's interest in ensuring the well-being of children is the sole basis for the government's licensee and involvement in marriage.

Pope John Paul II, (1978 - 2005) criticized same-sex marriage when it was introduced in the Netherlands in 2001. His successor Pope Benedict XVI (2005- 2013) maintained opposition to the institution, considering it amongst "the most insidious and dangerous threats to the common good today".

==== Eastern Orthodox Christianity ====
The Greek Orthodox, Serbian Orthodox and Russian Orthodox Churches are in opposition to gay marriage. Rev. Dr. Stanley S. Harakas states, "The position of the Orthodox Church toward homosexual acts has been expressed by synodicals, canons and patristic pronouncements from the very first centuries of Orthodox ecclesiastical life. In them, the Orthodox Church condemns unreservedly all expressions of personal sexual experience which prove contrary to the definite and unalterable function ascribed to sex by God's ordinance and expressed in man's experience as a law of nature. The Orthodox Church believes that homosexual behavior is a sin".

===== Views in Scripture =====
Within the Christian tradition, religious objections to same-sex marriages are often based upon the Bible.

Some religious arguments against same-sex marriage are based upon Old Testament biblical passages such as Genesis 19:4-11, Leviticus 18:22, and Leviticus 20:13, while others are based upon New Testament biblical passages such as Romans 1, I Corinthians 6:8-10, and Jude 1:7. Conservative Christians note that the book of Leviticus contains a prohibition against male-male sexuality. While the Biblical passages mentioned above do not define the institution of marriage, Genesis 2:22-24 reads as follows: "Then the Lord God made a woman from the rib he had taken out of the man, and he brought her to the man. The man said, 'This is now bone of my bones and flesh of my flesh; she shall be called 'woman,' for she was taken out of man.' For this reason a man will leave his father and mother and be united to his wife, and they will become one flesh." This passage is quoted by Jesus in the New Testament Gospel of Matthew.

==== Evangelical opposition ====
According to Reverend Rick Warren, a pastor of the conservative Evangelical Christian Saddleback megachurch, homosexuals are people who "think they are smarter than God" and who choose "to disobey God's sexual instructions." From Warren's point of view, marriage is an ordinance from God that unites a man and a woman. James Dobson, in Marriage Under Fire and elsewhere, argues that legalization for or passive tolerance of same-sex marriages would widen the definition of families.

The ex-gay movement takes the view that I Corinthians 6:9-11 offers Christian believers freedom from the sin of homosexual behavior. Evangelical author and counselor Joe Dallas notes that the Biblical passages relating to homosexual behavior uniformly prohibit that behavior.

==== Other Churches ====
Both the Eastern Orthodox Church in America and Unification Church oppose same-sex marriage.

===== LDS Church =====
The LDS Church (17 million members), Mormonism's largest denomination, opposes same-sex marriage, and the topic has been one of the church's foremost public concerns since 1993. LDS Church involvement around same-sex marriage legislation include playing important roles in defeating same-sex marriage legalization in Hawaii (Amendment 2), Alaska (Measure 2), Nebraska (Initiative 416), Nevada (Question 2), California (Prop 22), and Utah (Amendment 3). During Prop 8 church members represented as much as 80 to 90 percent of the early volunteers petitioning voters door-to-door and 50 percent of the campaign funds in support of it. Church leaders are prohibited from employing their authority to perform same-sex marriages, and church property cannot be used for same-sex weddings or receptions. A 2017 Public Religion Research Institute survey found that over half (52%) of Latter-day Saint young adults (18–29) supported same-sex marriage while less than a third (32%) of senior church members (65+) did the same.

===== Jehovah's Witnesses =====
Jehovah's Witnesses (8.2 million members) believes God condemns sexual activity that is not between a husband and his wife. They teach that while the Bible condemns homosexual acts, it does not condone hatred of homosexuals or homophobia.

=== Islam ===
Same sex marriage is not permissible in Islamic teachings.

In Albania, Tunisia, and Turkey, there have been discussions about legalizing same-sex marriage, but without success (one reason was that the huge majority of the people in those countries and also almost all political parties are against same sex marriage).

In France, there was "an Islamic same-sex marriage" on February 18, 2012. In Paris in November 2012 a room in a Buddhist prayer hall was used by gay Muslims and called a "gay-friendly mosque", and a French Islamic website is supporting religious same-sex marriage.

A majority of American Muslims (51 percent) support same-sex marriage as of 2017, according to a survey by the Public Religion Research Institute in their "2017 American Values Atlas."

The first American Muslim in the United States Congress, Keith Ellison (D-MN) said in 2010 that all discrimination against LGBT people is wrong. He further expressed support for gay marriage stating:

"I believe that the right to marry someone who you please is so fundamental it should not be subject to popular approval any more than we should vote on whether blacks should be allowed to sit in the front of the bus."

=== Orthodox Judaism ===
Judaism, like Christianity, reflects differing views between conservative and liberal adherents. Orthodox Judaism maintains the traditional Jewish bans on both sexual acts and marriage amongst members of the same sex. The Orthodox Union in the United States supported a federal Constitutional amendment banning same-sex marriages. Research by Chana Etengoff & Colette Daiute suggest that positive reconciliations between sexual minority individuals and Orthodox Jewish family members is possible (a process referred to as theistic mediation), both with and without clinical support.

=== Theravada Buddhists ===
Mettanando Bhikkhu, a physician and Harvard Buddhist scholar notes that the Buddha did not address gender or same sex relationships, saying "the Buddha was neither supportive nor against marriage between members of the same gender."

Thai Theravada Buddhists (over 150 million members), a more conservative wing of Buddhism, is less supportive of gay rights and marriages in Thailand and other countries where Theravadic Buddhism thrive. Human rights issues have received poor attention in Theravada countries, as the culture is rooted in the belief in the Law of Karma, which is more popular among Thai Buddhists than philosophical and advanced scriptural studies in Buddhism. Many monasteries and monks encourage lay followers to see the world through the lens of karma, i.e., every person is born to pay back their sins.Bhikkhu states, "all homosexuals and sexual deviants were once offenders of the Third Precept (prohibiting sexual misconduct) _ at least in their past lives, and they must pay off their past sins in their present life." Because of the lack of interest in human rights and also the belief in the law of Karma, therefore, Thai Buddhists will likely not approve of gay marriage any time soon. However, Theravada Buddhists outside of the South-East Asian Area, are generally more supportive, or neutral, to same-sex marriage, and LGBT rights as a whole.

=== Hinduism ===
The conservative branches of Hinduism opposes homosexuality and are less supportive to gay rights. In the ancient Hindu text of Manusmriti, the act of homosexuality has been described as unclean and considered as a sin. Many Dharmaśāstra, describes such acts of having relations with "third genders" (or Hijra in modern term) as immoral actions and are considered as Sexual misconduct.

== Freedom of religion ==
One source of controversy is how same-sex marriage affects freedom of religion. There is concern that religious communities might not be legally able to decide what type of marriages to solemnize. Some same-sex married couples have challenged religious organizations that exclude them from access to public facilities maintained by those organizations, such as schools, health care centers, social service agencies, summer camps, homeless shelters, nursing homes, orphanages, retreat houses, community centers, and athletic programs. Opponents of same-sex marriage have expressed concerns that this limits their religious freedoms. For example, conservatives worry that a Christian college would risk its tax-exempt status by refusing to admit a legally married gay couple to married-student housing. Some legal analysts suggest that failure to reflect gay rights within their organizations may cost some religious groups their tax-exempt status. In addition, religious opponents of same-sex marriage express concern about several specific instances in which they contend that religious freedoms have been abridged due to legal recognition of same-sex unions, including (a) an incident in Canada (which is subject to a different set of laws concerning same-sex marriage than the United States), in which the Knights of Columbus were sued for declining to allow a same-sex wedding reception on their property; (b) removal of real property tax exemption from a New Jersey Christian organization that did not allow a civil union ceremony to be performed on their property; (c) requirements that judges and justices of the peace perform same-sex wedding ceremonies; and (d) the forced closing of Catholic adoption agencies which refused to place children in the homes of married same-sex partners.

There is also a concern that religious people might be marginalized for their beliefs about marriage. Opponents point to the way Carrie Prejean was treated during the Miss USA 2009 controversy. There are also concerns about violence and intimidation against religious people. After a vote to make same-sex marriage illegal in California, same-sex marriage supporters published names of donors to the bill and classified them based on religion and many religious symbols were targeted. Elder Dallin H. Oaks of The Church of Jesus Christ of Latter-day Saints, likened the attacks against religious people to voter intimidation against black people during the American civil rights movement. Some governments have made special provisions for religious protections within the texts of same-sex marriage laws.

Americans United for Separation of Church and State argue that by defining marriage as an opposite-sex institution, the state infringes upon the constitutional right to freedom of religion. In this view, religious groups that do wish to celebrate same-sex marriages are discriminated against when government policies do not permit their religious groups to celebrate marriages as they see fit.
