= Beth Allison Barr =

American historian

- Occupations: Historian; Author
- Title: James Vardaman Endowed Professor of History
- Spouse: Jeb Barr

Academic background
- Education: Baylor University; University of North Carolina at Chapel Hill
- Alma mater: University of North Carolina at Chapel Hill

Academic work
- Discipline: History
- Sub-discipline: European Women; Medieval England; Early Modern England; Church history
- Institutions: Baylor University
- Notable works: The Making of Biblical Womanhood; Becoming the Pastor's Wife
- Website: www.bethallisonbarr.com

Beth Allison Barr is an American historian who is currently the James Vardaman Endowed Professor of History at Baylor University in Waco, Texas. Her specialities include European women, Medieval & Early Modern England, and church history. Her 2021 book The Making of Biblical Womanhood: How the Subjugation of Women Became Gospel Truth received widespread media coverage.

== Biography ==
Barr graduated from Baylor University in 1996 with a Bachelor of Arts in history (with a minor in classics). She subsequently studied Medieval History at the University of North Carolina at Chapel Hill, receiving a Master of Arts degree in 1999 and a Doctor of Philosophy in 2004. She returned to Baylor University as a lecturer in 2002, received tenure in 2014, served as the Graduate Program Director in History from 2016 to 2019, and as an Associate Dean in the Baylor Graduate School from 2019 to 2022, and became James Vardaman Endowed Professor of History in 2021.

Barr has served as president of two academic societies: the Texas Medieval Association in 2011 and The Conference on Faith and History from 2018 to 2020. Barr has written for Christianity Today, the Washington Post, and Religion News Service. She is a regular contributor to The Anxious Bench, the popular Patheos website, on Christian history.

Barr is married to Jeb, the pastor of First Baptist Church in Elm Mott, Texas. She has two children.

== The Making Of Biblical Womanhood: How the Subjugation of Women Became Gospel Truth ==
Barr's 2021 book The Making of Biblical Womanhood: How the Subjugation of Women Became Gospel Truth addressed the ongoing debate over women in Christianity. It received widespread coverage, including in secular media such as Newsweek, The New Yorker, and NPR, as well as Christian outlets such as The Gospel Coalition. A reviewer on Premier Christianity said "This powerful book is forcing the Church to re-think what the Bible says about women". After The Council on Biblical Manhood and Womanhood criticized the book and the church where Barr's husband serves as pastor, the church received more than $15,000 in donations.

== Selected works ==
- Becoming the Pastor’s Wife: How Marriage Replaced Ordination as a Woman’s Path to Ministry (2025); Brazos Press; ISBN 9781587435898
- The Making of Biblical Womanhood: How the Subjugation of Women Became Gospel Truth (2021); Brazos Press; ISBN 9781587434709
- Faith and History: A Devotional Paperback; co-editor with Christopher Gehrz (2020); Baylor University Press; ISBN 9781481313469
- The Acts of the Apostles: Four Centuries of Baptist Interpretation; co-editor with Mikeal C. Parsons, Bill J. Leonard, and C. Douglas Weaver (2009); Baylor University Press; ISBN 9781481304139
- The Pastoral Care of Women in Late Medieval England (2008); Boydell Press; ISBN 9781843833734

== See also ==
- Kristin Kobes Du Mez
