= Conferences in medieval studies =

Regular academic conferences in medieval studies include:

- International Congress on Medieval Studies, annual conference (Kalamazoo MI, U.S.)
- International Medieval Congress, annual conference (Leeds, UK)
- Medieval Academy of America, annual conference (various locations in the US and Canada)
- International Arthurian Society, International Arthurian Congress every three years, national branches hold branch meetings in the interim years (various locations)
- Canadian Society of Medievalists, annual conference (various locations in Canada)
- UBC Medieval Workshop, annual conference (Vancouver, Canada)
- Medieval Chronicle Society, triennial conference (various locations)
- International Congress for Medieval Latin Studies, quinquennial conference (various locations)
- International Medieval Society - Paris, annual symposium (Paris, France)
- The Medieval Translator, biennial conference (various locations)
- Association internationale pour l'étude du moyen français, biennial conference (various locations)
- Société internationale pour l'étude du théâtre médiéval, triennial conference (various locations)
- The Texas Medieval Association, annual conference (various locations in Texas)
- Vagantes Conference on Medieval Studies, annual conference (various locations in North America)
- International Reynard Society, biennial conference (various locations)
- New College Conference on Medieval & Renaissance Studies, biennial conference (Sarasota, Florida)
- New England Graduate Medieval Conference, annual conference (cycles between Brown University, University of Connecticut, and Yale University)
- North Texas Medieval Graduate Student Symposium, annual conference, University of North Texas, Denton Texas
- Byzantine Studies Conference, annual conference (various locations)
- International Medieval Meeting, annual conference (Lleida, Spain)
- Medieval Colloquium, annual conference (The University of the South, Sewanee, TN)
