= The Making of Biblical Womanhood =

2021 non-fiction book by Beth Allison Barr

The Making of Biblical Womanhood: How the Subjugation of Women Became Gospel Truth
- Author: Beth Allison Barr
- Language: English
- Genre: American evangelicalism Women in Christianity
- Publisher: Brazos Press
- Publication date: April 20, 2021
- Publication place: United States
- Pages: 256
- Awards: USA Today Bestseller
- ISBN: 978-1-587-43470-9
- OCLC: 1183422579
- Website: http://bakerpublishinggroup.com/books/the-making-of-biblical-womanhood/404050

The Making of Biblical Womanhood: How the Subjugation of Women Became Gospel Truth is a book written by Beth Allison Barr and published in 2021 by Brazos Press, a division of Baker Publishing Group. The book discusses women in Christianity and argues that the restrictive position known as complementarianism is a recent development inconsistent with the historic roles of women in the church.

== Synopsis ==
The central argument of the book is that "Patriarchy may be a part of Christian history, but that doesn't make it Christian."

== Reception ==
The book received widespread coverage, including in secular media such as Newsweek, The New Yorker, and NPR, as well as Christian outlets such as The Gospel Coalition and Christians For Biblical Equality. After The Council on Biblical Manhood and Womanhood criticized the book and the church where Barr's husband serves as pastor, the church received more than $15,000 in donations.

Eliza Griswold, writing in The New Yorker, noted that "Barr's central argument is that modern evangelicals often mistake cultural forces for Biblical ones, especially in regard to the role of women."

A reviewer on Premier Christianity said "This powerful book is forcing the Church to re-think what the Bible says about women".

Kevin DeYoung gave the book a negative review in Themelios, a journal published by The Gospel Coalition, prompting Australian theologian Michael Bird to defend the author in a YouTube video.

The book was reprinted five times in less than six months. Korean and Portuguese translations are in progress, to be published in 2023.

== See also ==
- Jesus and John Wayne
