= Christian nationalism in the United States =

Christianity-affiliated religious nationalism in the U.S.

Christian nationalism is a belief that asserts that the United States was founded strictly by and for Christians and therefore should prioritize their interests in all social and political spheres. Christian nationalists in the United States advocate "a fusion of identitarian Christian identity and cultural conservatism with American civic belonging". This "pervasive ideology" is supported by ideological values and historical narratives that center on preserving and "restoring" such beliefs to preeminence within America. It has been noted to bear overlap with white supremacy, Christian supremacy, the Seven Mountain Mandate movement, and dominionism. Most researchers have described Christian nationalism as "authoritarian" and "boundary-enforcing", but recent research has focused on how libertarian, small-government ideology and neoliberal political economics have become part of the American Christian nationalist political identity.

== Beliefs ==
=== Political, social, and religious beliefs ===
Religion studies scholar Julie Ingersoll writes that the movement is a complex amalgamation of a number of concepts and traditions, with a long-term focus on theocratic, authoritarian forms of government based on Christianity. Not strictly Protestant, the movement has also had a significant conservative Catholic contingent.

Christian nationalism also overlaps with but is distinct from theonomy, with it being more populist in character. Theocratic Christians seek to have the Bible inform national laws and have religious leaders in positions of government; while in America, Christian nationalists view the country's founding documents as "divinely inspired" and supernaturally revealed to Christian men to preference Christianity, and are willing to elect impious heads of state if they support right-wing causes.

Christian nationalism supports the presence of Christian symbols in the public square, and state patronage for the practice and display of religion, such as Christmas as a national holiday, school prayer, singing "God Bless America", the exhibition of nativity scenes during Christmastide, and the Christian cross on Good Friday.

Christian nationalism also influenced the constitution of the Confederacy. The Constitution of the Confederate States explicitly mentioned God, in contrast with the United States Constitution.

"We the People of the United States, in Order to form a more perfect Union, establish Justice, insure domestic Tranquility, provide for the common defence, promote the general Welfare, and secure the Blessings of Liberty to ourselves and our Posterity, do ordain and establish this Constitution for the United States of America."

— Gouverneur Morris, Preamble to the United States Constitution (1787)

"We, the people of the Confederate States, each state acting in its sovereign and independent character, in order to form a permanent federal government, establish justice, insure domestic tranquillity, and secure the blessings of liberty to ourselves and our posterity – invoking the favor and guidance of Almighty God – do ordain and establish this Constitution for the Confederate States of America."

— Preamble to the Constitution of the Confederate States (1862)

Christian nationalism has been linked to prejudice towards minority groups. Christian nationalism has been loosely defined as a belief that "celebrate[s] and privilege[s] the sacred history, liberty, and rightful rule of white conservatives". Christian nationalism prioritizes an ethno-cultural, ethno-religious, and ethno-nationalist framing around fear of "the other", those being immigrants, racial, and sexual minorities. Studies have associated Christian nationalism with xenophobia, homophobia, misogyny, political tolerance of racists, opposition to interracial unions, support for gun rights, pronatalism, and restricting the civil rights of those who fail to conform to traditional ideals of whiteness, citizenship, and Protestantism. The Christian nationalist belief system includes elements of patriarchy, white supremacy, nativism, and heteronormativity. It has been associated with a "conquest narrative", premillennial apocalypticism, and of frequent "rhetoric of blood, specifically, of blood sacrifice to an angry God".

American Christian nationalism is based on a worldview that America is superior to other countries, and that such superiority is divinely established. It posits that only Christians are "true Americans". Christian nationalism also bears overlap with the American militia movement. The 1992 Ruby Ridge standoff and the 1993 Waco siege served as a catalyst for the growth of militia activity among Christian nationalists. Christian nationalists believe that the U.S. is meant to be a Christian nation, and that it was founded as a Christian nation, and want to "take back" the U.S. for God.

Christian nationalists feel that their values and religion are threatened and marginalized, and fear their freedom to preach their moral values will be no longer dominant at best or outlawed at worst. Experimental research found that support of Christian nationalism increased when Christian Americans were told of their demographic decline. Studies have shown Christian nationalists to exhibit higher levels of anger, depression, anxiety, and emotional distress. It has been theorized that Christian nationalists fear that they are "not living up to" God's expectations, and "fear the wrath and punishment" of not creating the country desired by God.

Some Christian nationalists also engage in spiritual warfare and militarized forms of prayers in order to defend and advance their beliefs and political agenda. According to American Studies professor S. Jonathon O'Donnell, "A key idea in spiritual warfare is that demons don't only attack people, as in depictions of demonic possession, but also take control of places and institutions, such as journalism, academia, and both municipal and federal bureaucracies. By doing so, demons are framed as advancing social projects that spiritual warriors see as opposing God's plans. These include advances in reproductive and LGBTQ rights and tolerance for non-Christian religions (especially Islam)."

=== Economic beliefs ===
Research has drawn connections between a "distinctly libertarian and neoliberal impulse within Christian nationalism" that views individual liberty and economic prosperity as a sacred right. Most Christian nationalists in the United States are supportive of entrepreneurship and capitalism, while being highly skeptical of social welfare programs. However some other Christian nationalists, such as James Fishback and Tucker Carlson, have criticized unregulated capitalism and support welfare chauvinism instead.

==== Comparison with Catholic social teaching ====
Catholic social teaching explicitly distances itself from capitalism. For example, Pope John Paul II wrote:

Catholic social doctrine is not a surrogate for capitalism. In fact, although decisively condemning "socialism", the church, since Leo XIII's Rerum Novarum, has always distanced itself from capitalistic ideology, holding it responsible for grave social injustices. In Quadragesimo Anno, Pius XI, for his part, used clear and strong words to stigmatize the international imperialism of money.

Commentators say that Christian-associated support for right-wing politicians and social policies, such as legislation which is related to immigration, gun control and poverty is best understood as Christian nationalism, rather than evangelicalism per se.

=== Attitudes towards science ===
Adherence to Christian nationalism has been associated with high levels of distrust of science, especially those parts perceived as challenging biblical authority. During the COVID-19 pandemic, Christian nationalists frequently opposed measures including lockdowns, restrictions on social gatherings and mask-wearing. In a 2020 study, it was found that "even after accounting for sociodemographic, religious, and political characteristics", Christian nationalism was a "leading predictor" that individuals "prioritize the economy and deprioritize the vulnerable" due to a "pervasive ideology that blends Christian identity with conceptions of economic prosperity and individual liberty". Christian nationalism has also been associated with belief in conspiracy theories.

Analysis of Christian nationalists in America found that "Christian nationalism is the strongest predictor that Americans fail to affirm factually correct answers". When asked about Christianity's place in American founding documents, policies, and court decisions, those who embraced Christian nationalism had more confident incorrect answers, while those who rejected it had more confident correct answers. A 2021 research article theorized that, like conservative Christians that incorrectly answer science questions that are "religiously contested", Christian nationalism inclines individuals to "affirm factually incorrect views about religion in American political history, likely through their exposure to certain disseminators of such misinformation, but also through their allegiance to a particular political-cultural narrative they wish to privilege".

=== Attitudes towards political violence ===
Christian nationalism has been linked towards support for political violence. Such support is conditioned by support for conspiratorial information sources, white identity, perceived victimhood, and support for the QAnon movement. A 2021 survey of 1,100 U.S. adults found that respondents who combined Christian nationalism with these factors exhibited increased support for political violence.

== History ==
Julie Ingersoll argues that rather than being a new movement, Christian nationalism and its origins weave back decades through the Tea Party, the new Christian right, the Moral Majority, and the old Christian right, with R. J. Rushdoony's Christian reconstructionism being another significant source of influence. She traces its origins still further back to the Antebellum South and early American Puritanism.

Historians and writers have also pointed to the mid-1800s and Joseph Smith, who founded the Latter Day Saint movement, as providing important historical context for the development of U.S. Christian nationalist ideas, due to factors such as his strong influence over the Nauvoo Legion militia and his 1844 presidential campaign that called for Restorationist Christian theodemocracy. Both those aspects of Smith and specific interpretations of Brigham Young's views and governance style also inspired the DezNat movement—a sectarian Restorationist nationalist ideology and collection of loosely-affiliated far-right Latter Day Saint movement groups.

Historian Kristen Kobes Du Mez, in her book Jesus and John Wayne, describes the rise of American evangelical preacher Billy Graham in the 1940s. His rallies, aimed at reaching youth with the gospel, also featured "patriotic hymns, color guards, and veterans' testimonies"; she describes Graham as "[preaching] a gospel of heroic Christian nationalism with unparalleled passion".

During the Cold War, church attendance reached a high point in the 1950s, which was also when the United States added phrases like under God to the Pledge of Allegiance and on currency, described at the time as a civil religion that was motivated in part to show distance from godless communism. Also during the 1950s and 1960s, religious ethics were applied to American foreign policy through figures such as John Foster Dulles and Allen Dulles, whose devoutly religious worldview held that communism was "Godless terrorism", and that the United States's role in suppressing the ideology was divinely ordained.

In the 1980s and 1990s, the religious right in America featured religious traditionalists who advocated for religious liberty, racial equality, democratic values and the separation of church and state while also working to maintain white Protestant dominance. By the mid-1990s and especially following the 9/11 attacks, religious traditionalists gave way to Christian nationalists who sought explicit state favor and the exclusion of national and racial minorities. Islamophobia soon spread to include Latinos, Asians, and other immigrants as threats to Christian democracy, and Christian nationalists embraced ethonationalist white nativism and racism. The ethno-nationalist developments saw a majority of Christian statists support the presidency of Donald Trump, the QAnon movement and the January 6 United States Capitol attack.

== Demographics ==
=== Demographic factors ===
Christian nationalism is positively correlated with older age and lower education levels. It is also correlated with lower population density and Republican representation in state legislatures, particularly in the Southern United States.

Christian nationalists are more likely to support political violence than other Americans, score higher on the right-wing authoritarianism scale, and have more extreme views against immigrants.

=== 2025 table by state and D.C. ===
Adherents plus sympathizers equals Sum column in table.

The state and D.C. links are Politics of Area links.

Support for Christian Nationalism by State and DC. Percent of adults in 2025.
Area	Adherent	Sympathizer	Sum	Skipped	Skeptic	Rejecter
All Americans	11	21	32	4	37	27
Alabama	15	26	41	4	37	18
Alaska	13	29	42	2	34	22
Arizona	10	20	30	9	36	25
Arkansas	22	32	54	3	27	15
California	7	15	22	4	41	33
Colorado	7	22	29	4	36	31
Connecticut	9	18	27	4	37	31
Delaware	16	22	38	5	36	21
District of Columbia	15	19	34	0	30	36
Florida	13	24	37	5	38	20
Georgia	16	26	42	6	32	20
Hawaii	9	20	29	0	37	34
Idaho	14	25	39	5	35	22
Illinois	9	18	27	4	39	31
Indiana	12	25	37	4	35	23
Iowa	12	20	32	7	40	20
Kansas	11	26	37	1	40	23
Kentucky	12	25	37	4	36	22
Louisiana	20	24	44	4	33	18
Maine	8	20	28	3	44	25
Maryland	9	21	30	4	34	31
Massachusetts	4	11	15	5	40	40
Michigan	10	23	33	3	37	27
Minnesota	8	20	28	6	33	33
Mississippi	24	28	52	6	32	11
Missouri	14	30	44	2	37	18
Montana	13	28	41	2	29	28
Nebraska	11	27	38	1	45	16
Nevada	6	19	25	6	39	31
New Hampshire	7	20	27	3	44	26
New Jersey	6	16	22	4	37	37
New Mexico	13	17	30	2	41	28
New York	5	16	21	6	41	32
North Carolina	13	23	36	3	32	28
North Dakota	16	26	42	2	42	14
Ohio	12	23	35	3	40	22
Oklahoma	25	24	49	2	28	21
Oregon	9	16	25	2	32	41
Pennsylvania	11	23	34	5	36	25
Rhode Island	6	21	27	0	44	29
South Carolina	16	25	41	3	36	20
South Dakota	15	27	42	1	38	19
Tennessee	14	22	36	4	39	19
Texas	14	24	38	5	36	21
Utah	9	22	31	1	46	22
Vermont	10	20	30	0	34	35
Virginia	7	23	30	5	32	34
Washington	3	15	18	5	39	38
West Virginia	15	36	51	3	29	17
Wisconsin	10	22	32	5	42	21
Wyoming	21	25	46	3	32	20

=== Breakdown and map ===
A map showing the sum of Christian nationalist "adherents" and "sympathizers" in each US state according to the Public Religion Research Institute 2025 American Values Atlas

According to the Public Religion Research Institute 2025 American Values Atlas, 32% of Americans qualify as Christian nationalism Adherents (11%) or Sympathizers (21%), compared with 64% who qualify as Skeptics (37%) or Rejecters (27%). Those who relate to Christian nationalist views were more likely to be White, Republican, and trusting of far-right news sources and Fox News. Christian nationalism is also highly correlated with positive views of Donald Trump.

A study which was conducted in May 2022 showed that the strongest base of support for Christian nationalism comes from Republicans who identify as evangelical or born-again Christians. Of this demographic group, 78% are in favor of formally declaring that the United States should be a Christian nation, versus only 48% of Republicans overall.

Age is also a factor, with over 70% of Republicans from the Baby Boomer and Silent Generations (born in 1964 or earlier) supporting the United States officially becoming a Christian nation. According to Politico, the polling also found that sentiments of white grievance are highly correlated with Christian nationalism: "White respondents who say that members of their race have faced more discrimination than others are most likely to embrace a Christian America. Roughly 59% of all Americans who say white people have been discriminated against ... favor declaring the U.S. a Christian nation, compared to 38% of all Americans."

Author Bradley Onishi, a vocal critic of Christian nationalism, has described this theologically infused political ideology as a "national renewal project that envisions a pure American body that is heterosexual, white, native-born, that speaks English as a first language, and that is thoroughly patriarchal". Commentators say that Christian-associated support for right-wing politicians and social policies, such as legislation which is related to immigration, gun control and poverty is best understood as Christian nationalism, rather than evangelicalism per se. Some studies of white evangelicals show that, among people who self-identify as evangelical Christians, the more they attend church, the more they pray, and the more they read the Bible, the less support they have for nationalist (though not socially conservative) policies. Non-nationalistic evangelicals ideologically agree with Christian nationalists in areas such as gender roles and sexuality.

=== Prevalence of views ===
Pinning down the prevalence of Christian nationalism is difficult owing to Christian nationalist beliefs going by different names and coming in different forms. Via surveys, participants' answers can be coded to figure out where an answer lands ideologically in order to see which groups align with the ideals of Christian nationalism. In the 2020 book Taking America Back for God: Christian Nationalism in the United States published by Oxford University Press, sociologists Andrew Whitehead and Samuel Perry asked the following questions to be answered on a scale of agreement:

- Should the federal government declare the United States a Christian nation?
- Should the federal government advocate Christian values?
- Should the federal government enforce strict separation of church and state?
- Should the federal government allow the display of religious symbols in public spaces?
- Is the success of the United States part of God's plan?
- Should the federal government allow prayer in public schools?

Then researchers divided supporters of Christian nationalism, estimated to be 52% of the overall American population, into two groups, "accommodators" and "ambassadors". The "accommodators" are those who subscribe to Christian nationalism but less ideologically, and made up 32% of the sample, while those fully committed to Christian nationalism, the "ambassadors", were estimated to represent 20%. The other 48% were classified as "resisters" and "rejecters", those who do not align with Christian nationalistic ideology. This data was derived from a study done in 2017. More recently, the Public Religion Research Institute found that in 2023, 10% of Americans identified as "adherents" of Christian nationalism, while 20% identified as "sympathizers". In red states, traditionally aligned with the Republican Party, these numbers rose to 14% and 24% respectively; while among Trump supporters they further rose to 21% "adherents" and 34% "sympathizers".

Another way to assess Christian nationalism comes from a study done in 2024 that explores Christian nationalism and Americans' view on citizens' rights. The study took into consideration the question often asked by the Whitehead Perry model, then asked participants to rank certain rights on a scale of most to least important. Their study found that participants who ranked gun rights, religion, or states' rights as the "most important right" aligned most with Christian nationalism, while finding freedom of the press, free speech, right to a speedy and fair trial, or protection from unlawful searches and seizures, as the "most important right" is unaligned with Christian nationalist ideals. The most significant conclusion was that Christian nationalism is associated with believing that voting is a privilege rather than a right, thus providing evidence for Christian nationalists to be aligned with policies that restrict who can vote and who is deemed a citizen.

== Movements ==
The Christian Liberty Party and the American Redoubt movement—both organized and inspired by members of the Constitution Party—are early 21st-century examples of political tendencies rooted in Christian nationalism, with the latter advocating a degree of separatism.

The New Columbia Movement is an organization in the United States that identifies as being aligned with Christian nationalism. Another group is the New Apostolic Reformation, which includes Christian nationalist themes in its goal to bring about dominionism.

== Proponents ==
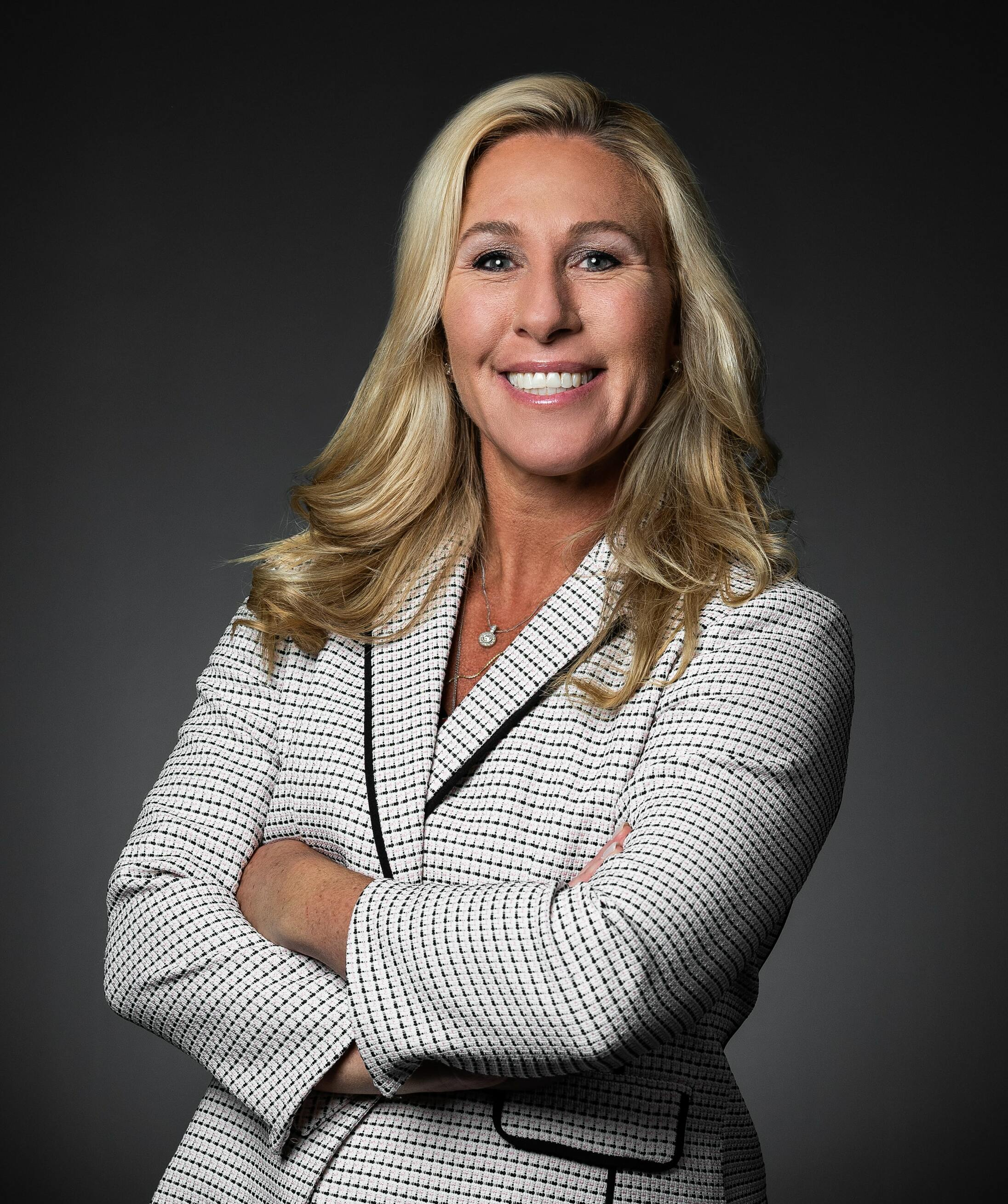
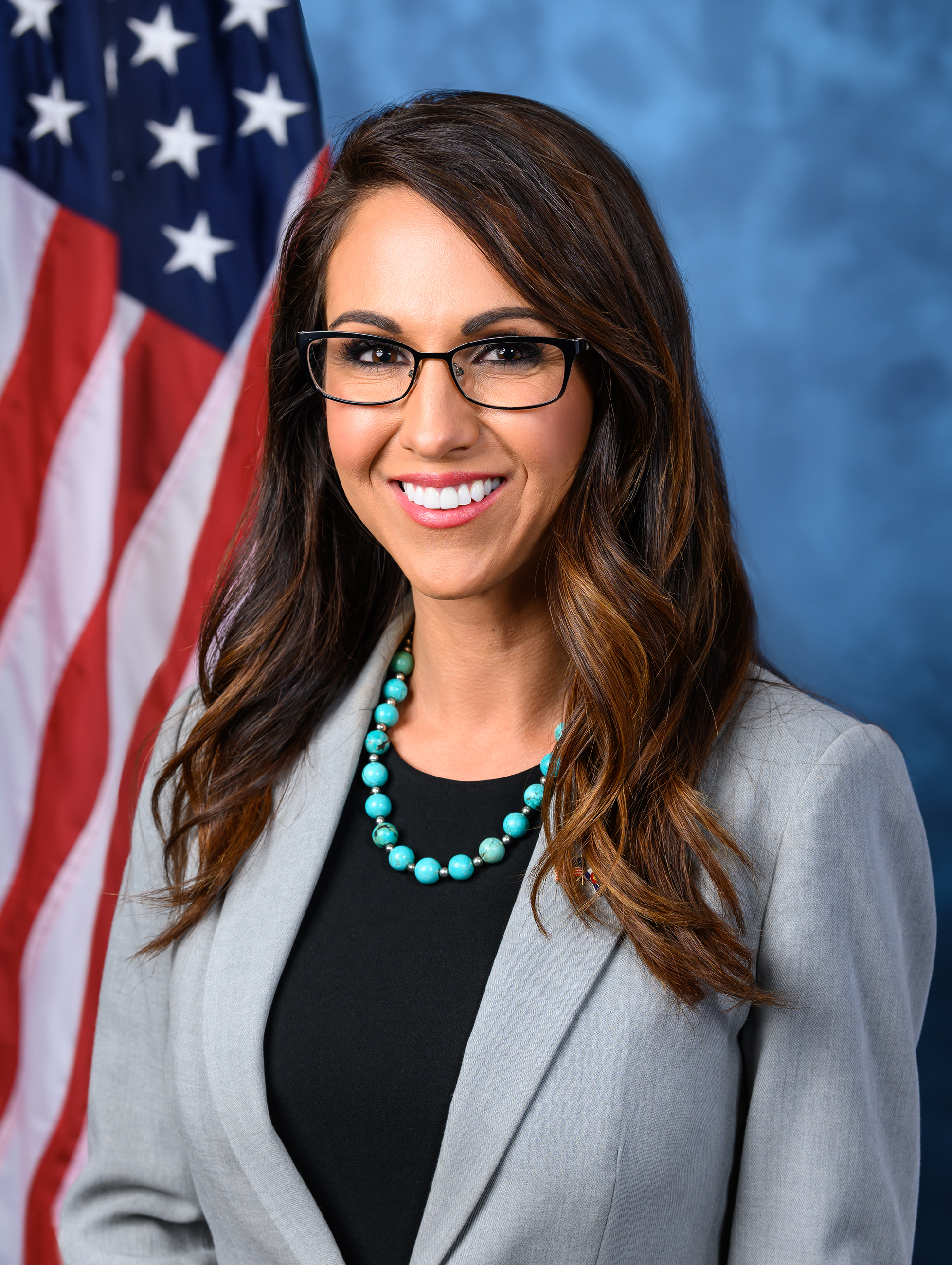
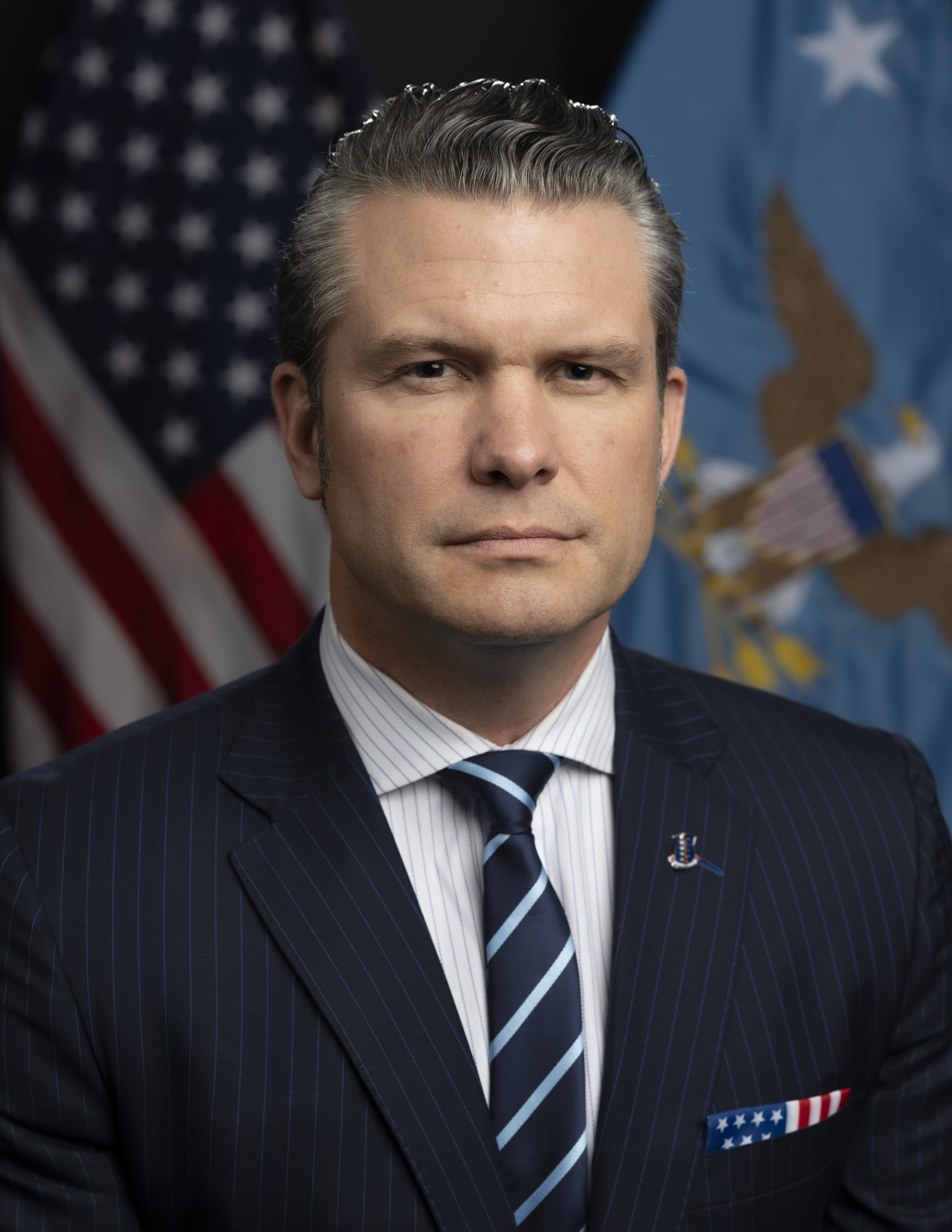
21st-century proponents of Christian nationalism in the United States include Marjorie Taylor Greene, Lauren Boebert, and Pete Hegseth.

Congresswoman Marjorie Taylor Greene has referred to herself as a Christian nationalist.

Representative Andy Ogles (TN-05) has called for a battle for a Christian nation. Fellow congresswoman Lauren Boebert also expressed support for Christian nationalism. Politician Doug Mastriano is a prominent figure in the fundamentalist Christian nationalist movement and has called the separation of church and state a myth.

Andrew Torba, the CEO of the alt-tech platform Gab, supported Mastriano's failed 2022 bid for office in order to build a grass-roots Christian nationalist political movement to help "take back" government power for "the glory of God". He has argued that "unapologetic Christian Nationalism is what will save the United States of America". Torba is a proponent of the Great Replacement conspiracy theory and he has said that the "White Genocide" should be fought by having lots of white babies. Torba also runs ChristianNationalist.com, a site that promoted Corey Mahler's podcast as "#1 Christian Nationalist podcast in the world”. Mahler has said that Adolf Hitler is in Paradise and "Tolerance for the Jews is apostasy before God". Christian nationalist pastors like Joel Webbon and Brian Sauvé and their ministries also promoted the website. Pastor Joel Webbon organized the Christian nationalist "Christ is King" event in Texas in November 2026, attended by 1,300 people and speakers included Christian nationalists like Fr. Calvin Robinson and Nick Fuentes. Robinson called for the deportation of Jewish people from the United States.

White nationalist Nick Fuentes has also expressed support for Christian nationalism. Pastor Dale Partridge is a proponent of Christian nationalism, and has stated that Nazism "terrified the Jews because it represented a powerful form of Christian nationalism".

Author Katherine Stewart is not a social or cultural movement, but rather it is a political movement with power as its ultimate goal. Stewart also notes that Florida governor Ron DeSantis has identified with and promoted this system of values in order to gain votes in his bid for political advancement. According to the Tampa Bay Times, DeSantis has also promoted a civics course for educators, which emphasized the belief that "the nation's founders did not desire a strict separation of state and church"; the teacher training program also "pushed a judicial theory, favored by legal conservatives like DeSantis, that requires people to interpret the Constitution as the framers intended it, not as a living, evolving document".

On October 12, 2024, during the Jewish holiday of Yom Kippur, tens of thousands of people attended a rally at the National Mall in Washington, D.C. It was sponsored by Jennifer Donnelly, a marketing professional, and Lou Engle and other pro-Trump members of the New Apostolic Reformation movement. Engle is described by the Southern Poverty Law Center as "an anti-LGBTQ+ extremist". A newsletter mentioned "the Lord's authority over the election process and our nation's leadership", and flyers promoted a meeting by Turning Point USA Faith.

=== January 6 US Capitol attack and election certification ===
In the wake of the January 6 attack on the Capitol, the term "Christian nationalism" has become synonymous with white Christian identity politics, a belief system that asserts itself as an integral part of American identity overall. The New York Times notes that historically, "Christian nationalism in America has ... encompassed extremist ideologies". Critics have argued that Christian nationalism promotes racist tendencies, male violence, anti-democratic sentiment, and revisionist history. Christian nationalism in the United States is also linked to political opposition to gun control laws and strong cultural support for interpretations of the Second Amendment that protect the right of individuals to keep and bear arms. Political analyst Jared Yates Sexton has said, "Republicans recognize that QAnon and Christian nationalism are invaluable tools" and that these belief systems "legitimize antidemocratic actions, political violence, and widespread oppression", which he calls an "incredible threat" that extends beyond Trumpism.

The Baptist Joint Committee for Religious Liberty and the Freedom From Religion Foundation (FFRF) released a 66-page report on February 9, 2022, titled "Christian Nationalism and the January 6, 2021 Insurrection". It chronicled the use of Christian imagery and language by protestors on January 6, detailed the "various nonprofit groups, lawmakers and clergy who worked together to adorn Jan. 6 and Donald Trump's effort to overturn his electoral loss with theological fervor", and discussed the important role that race had to play.

The Washington Post reported that God & Country, a documentary film produced by Rob Reiner, was released in early 2024 to "wake up churchgoing American Christians" to the "threat of anti-democratic religious extremism in the United States".

== Academic debate ==
Responding to media analysis about the effects of Trumpism and Christian nationalism following the 2020 U.S. presidential election, Professor Daniel Strand, writing for The American Conservative, said that there was a "superficially Christian presence at the January 6 protest" and he criticized claims that Christian nationalism played a central role in the attack on the Capitol. He cited a University of Chicago study which found that "those arrested on January 6 were motivated by the belief that the election was stolen and [influenced by] what they call 'the great replacement'" theory. Strand says the study failed to mention "any explicit religious motivation, let alone theological beliefs about America being a Christian nation".

Whether or not someone should be labeled a Christian nationalist can be contentious, with some scholars arguing that the term is applied to people who do not follow Christian principles or who simply call their political rivals demons. Ambiguity in the term's meaning can lead to confusion as to where to draw the line, with researcher Paul Djupe creating the Christian Nationalism Scale to measure how many Christian nationalist beliefs a person has. Matthew D. Taylor prefers to use the term Christian supremacy over Christian nationalism, citing the anti-democratic tendencies within the movement. Professor Whitney Phillips thinks the label is too often applied to a faction who should be referred to as "demonologists" due to the focus on claiming that liberals are satanic and inhabited by demons, which he finds too radical and dangerous to be considered Christian. Brian Kaylor believes that some of the rhetoric, such as around comparing Trump to Jesus, would historically be considered blasphemous by many Christians.

== See also ==
- Accommodationism in the United States
- American civil religion – Sociological theory
- Bible Belt – Cultural region of the United States
- Biblical inerrancy – Belief that the Bible is without error
- Christian amendment – Proposed constitutional amendments
- Christian right – Socially conservative Christian political ideology
- Christian support of Donald Trump
- Establishment Clause – Prohibits the U.S. Congress from establishing an official religion
- House Bill 71 – Louisiana law directing schools to display the Ten Commandments
- Islamic extremism in the United States
- In God We Trust – National motto of the United States and Nicaragua
- Project 2025 – Conservative political initiative in the United States
- Radical right (United States)#Trumpism – Political preference that leans towards the far-right
- Religious qualifications for public office in the United States
- Separation of church and state in the United States – Political principle in the United States
- Sola scriptura – Protestant Christian theological doctrine
- Trumpism – American right-wing to far-right populist political ideology
- Oklahoma Statewide Charter School Board v. Drummond
