= James Dobson =

American evangelical Christian psychologist and author (1936–2025)

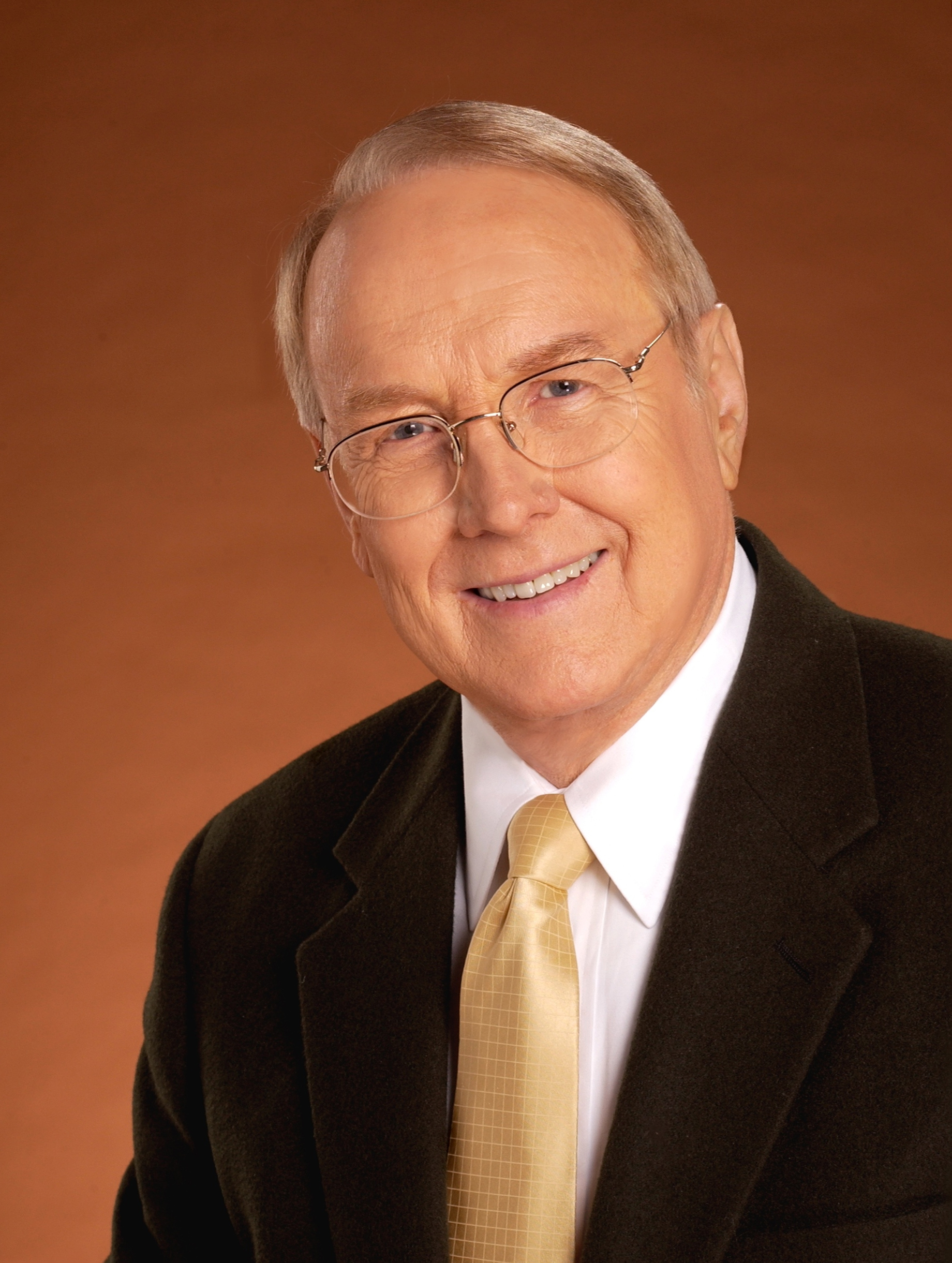
- Dobson in 2013

Personal life
- Born: James Clayton Dobson Jr. April 21, 1936 Shreveport, Louisiana, U.S.
- Died: August 21, 2025 (aged 89) Colorado Springs, Colorado, U.S.
- Spouse: Shirley Deere (m. 1960)
- Children: 2
- Notable work: Marriage Under Fire
- Education: Point Loma Nazarene University (BA); University of Southern California (MA, PhD)
- Website: www.drjamesdobson.org

Religious life
- Religion: Evangelical Christian
- Founder of: Family Research Council; Focus on the Family; Family Policy Alliance

James Clayton Dobson Jr. (Note: He is commonly referred to as "Jim Dobson".) (April 21, 1936 – August 21, 2025) was an American evangelical Christian author, psychologist and founder of Focus on the Family (FotF), which he led from 1977 until 2010. In the 1980s, he was ranked as one of the most influential spokesmen for conservative social positions in American public life. Although never an ordained minister, he was called "the nation's most influential evangelical leader" by The New York Times while Slate portrayed him as being a successor to evangelical leaders Jerry Falwell and Pat Robertson.

As part of his role in the organization he produced the daily radio program Focus on the Family, which was broadcast in more than a dozen languages and on over 7,000 stations worldwide, and heard daily by more than 220 million people in 164 countries. Focus on the Family was also carried by about 60 U.S. television stations daily. In 2010, he launched the radio broadcast Family Talk with Dr. James Dobson.

Dobson advocated for "family values"—the instruction of children in heterosexuality and traditional gender roles, which he believed are mandated by the Bible. The goal of this was to promote heterosexual marriage, which he viewed as a cornerstone of civilization that was to be protected from his perceived dangers of feminism and the LGBTQ rights movement. Dobson sought to equip his audience to fight in the American culture war, which he called the "Civil War of Values".

His writing career began as an assistant to Paul Popenoe. After Dobson's rise to prominence through promoting corporal punishment of disobedient children in the 1970s, he became a founder of purity culture in the 1990s. He promoted his ideas via his various Focus on the Family affiliated organizations, the Family Research Council which he founded in 1981, Family Policy Alliance which he founded in 2004, the Dr. James Dobson Family Institute which he founded in 2010, and a network of US state-based lobbying organizations called Family Policy Councils.

== Early life and education ==
James Clayton Dobson Jr. was born to Myrtle Georgia (née Dillingham) and James C. Dobson Sr. on April 21, 1936, in Shreveport, Louisiana. From his earliest childhood, religion played a central part in his life. He once told a reporter that he learned to pray before he learned to talk, and says he gave his life to Jesus at the age of three, in response to an altar call by his father. He was the son, grandson, and great-grandson of Church of the Nazarene ministers.

His parents were traveling evangelists; as a child, Dobson often stayed with family members while his parents were out traveling. Like most Nazarenes, they forbade dancing and going to movies. Young Jimmie Lee, as he was called, concentrated on his studies. As a teenager, he was rebellious, though he eventually found a close relationship with his father.

Dobson's mother was intolerant of "sassiness" and would strike her child with whatever object came to hand, including a shoe or belt; she once gave Dobson a "massive blow" with a girdle outfitted with straps and buckles. Dobson studied academic psychology and came to believe that he was being called to become a Christian counselor or perhaps a Christian psychologist. He attended Pasadena College (now Point Loma Nazarene University) as an undergraduate, where he met his wife, Shirley, and served as captain of the school's tennis team. Dobson graduated in 1958, served in the National Guard for six months, and began working at Children's Hospital Los Angeles. In 1967, Dobson received his doctorate in psychology from the University of Southern California in Los Angeles.

== Career ==
=== Early career ===
In 1967, he became an Associate Clinical Professor of Pediatrics at the University of Southern California School of Medicine for 14 years. At USC he was exposed to troubled youth and the counterculture of the 1960s. He found it "a distressing time to be so young" because society offered him no moral absolutes he felt he could rely upon. Opposition to United States involvement in the Vietnam War was blossoming into a widespread rejection of authority, which Dobson viewed as "a sudden disintegration of moral and ethical principles" among Americans his age and the younger people he saw in clinical practice. This convinced him that "the institution of the family was disintegrating."

Based on these experiences, in 1970 Dobson published Dare to Discipline. The book encouraged parents to assert their authority over their children, particularly by corporal punishment. Dobson saw children as rebellious and inherently sinful and believed a rejection of authority to be the source of societal problems. He wrote that "Respect for leadership is the glue that holds social organization together. Without it there is chaos, violence, and insecurity for everyone."

He spent 17 years on the staff of the Children's Hospital of Los Angeles in the Division of Child Development and Medical Genetics. For a time, Dobson worked as an assistant to Paul Popenoe and counselor at Popenoe's Institute of Family Relations, a marriage-counseling center, in Los Angeles. Popenoe counseled couples on the importance of same-race marriage and adherence to gender norms for the purpose of eugenics. Under Popenoe, Dobson published about male-female differences and the dangers of feminism. When the American Psychological Association de-pathologized homosexuality by removing it from their list of mental disorders in 1973, Dobson resigned from the organization in protest. In 1976, he took a sabbatical from USC and Children's Hospital; he never returned.

With funding from a Christian publisher, he began to broadcast his ideas on the radio and in public lectures. Saying that he feared to repeat the mistakes of his own absentee father by being away on the lecture circuit, Dobson video recorded and distributed his lectures. He sent a representative around the country to solicit funding from evangelical businessmen and distribute the videos. A video about absent fathers titled Where's Dad? had 100 million views by the early 1980s.

=== Focus on the Family ===
In 1977, he founded Focus on the Family. He grew the organization into a multimedia empire by the mid-1990s, including 10 radio programs, 11 magazines, numerous videos, basketball camps, and a program of faxing suggested sermon topics and bulletin fillers to thousands of churches every week. In 1995, the organization's budget was more than $100 million annually.

Before becoming famous for the radio ministry, he created the "Focus on the Family Film Series" released in 1978 based on his Family Life seminars.

Jimmy Carter organized a White House Conference on Families in 1979–1980 that explicitly included a "diversity of families" with various structures. Dobson objected to this, believing that only his preferred notion of the traditional family—one headed by a male breadwinner married to a female caregiver—should be endorsed by the conference. He also objected to the fact that he was not invited to the planning for the event. At Dobson's urging, his listeners wrote 80,000 letters to the White House asking for Dobson to be invited, which he eventually was. This demonstrated to Dobson his power to rally his followers for political ends.

Beginning in 1980, Dobson built networks of political activists and founded lobbying organizations that advocated against LGBTQ rights and opposed legal abortion, among other socially conservative policy goals. He nurtured relationships with conservative politicians, such as Ronald Reagan. He was among the founders of Family Research Council in 1981, a federal lobbying organization classified as a hate group, and Family Policy Councils that lobby at the level of state government. When Focus on the Family moved to Colorado Springs in 1991, the city started to be called "the Vatican of the Religious Right" with Dobson imagined as an evangelical pope.

Focus on the Family established an ex-gay program called Love Won Out in 1998. The program promoted conversion therapy, the pseudoscientific practice of attempting to make gay people straight. Dobson increased his promotion of Love Won Out in 2000 upon discovering that opposition to gay marriage was helping the Christian Right gain members and voters. State-level affiliates of FotF drafted gay marriage bans in several states, starting with Nebraska Initiative 416 in 2000. Dobson broadcast that gay marriage was turning children from faithful Christian homes against God. His arguments caused large evangelical turnouts in support of the gay marriage prohibitions, resulting in defense of marriage amendments to thirty U.S. state constitutions.

Dobson stepped down as president and CEO of Focus on the Family in 2003, and resigned from the position of chairman of the board in February 2009. Dobson explained his departure as twofold: firstly, to allow a smooth transfer of leadership to the next generation, and in this case, to Jim Daly whom he directly appointed as his replacement. And secondly, because he and Daly had divergent views on policy, "especially when it comes to confronting those who would weaken the family and undermine our faith." After he stepped down, Focus on the Family hired an orthodoxy expert to maintain Dobson's message. Free to become more explicitly political without imperiling Focus on the Family's tax exemptions, Dobson rededicated himself primarily to lobbying instead of advice to families. While Daly attempted to appeal to a new generation of evangelicals with softened messages on abortion and homosexuality, Dobson remained hard-line. Focus on the Family removed archives of Dobson's writing from their headquarters and website.

=== Ted Bundy interview ===
Dobson interviewed serial killer Ted Bundy on-camera the day before Bundy's execution on January 24, 1989. In the interview Bundy was given an opportunity to attempt to explain his actions (the rape and murder of 30 young women). Bundy claimed in the interview (in a reversal of his previous stance) that violent pornography played a significant role in molding and crystallizing his fantasies. In May 1989, during an interview with John Tanner, a Republican Florida prosecutor, Dobson called for Bundy to be forgiven. The Bundy tapes gave Focus on the Family revenues of over $1 million, $600,000 of which it donated to anti-pornography groups and to anti-abortion groups.

=== Shift to political activity ===
In 2004, Dobson founded Family Policy Alliance, a lobbying arm of his media empire. With a more permissive tax status than Focus on the Family, it was allowed to directly fundraise for political campaigns. The Alliance also coordinates the action of Dobson's network of state-based Family Policy Councils. Together, these organizations seek to encode traditional gender roles into public policy and law. They consider LGBTQ rights to be a threatening "agenda".

Throughout its existence, Dobson has attacked the President's Emergency Plan for AIDS Relief (PEPFAR), a US government program to fight AIDS worldwide. In 2006, he said that "80 percent of this money is going toward terrible programs that are immoral as well as ineffective. For example, to promote condom distribution, people associated with these government programs have dressed up like condoms and created ceramic sculptures of male genitalia." He renewed his attack in 2023, falsely claiming that PEPFAR funds abortions. Focus on the Family received a grant of $49,505 through PEPFAR in 2017 to operate an abstinence-only purity pledge program.

=== Dr. James Dobson Family Institute ===
In 2010, Dobson founded the Dr. James Dobson Family Institute, a non-profit organization that produces his radio program, Dr. James Dobson's Family Talk. He stepped away from leadership of the Dr. James Dobson Family Institute in 2022, naming Joe Waresak the new president. He continued to broadcast his radio show.

Dobson frequently appeared as a guest on the Fox News Channel.

== Personal life and death ==
Dobson and Shirley Deere were married on August 26, 1960. The couple had two children. Dobson turned control of some of Focus on the Family's youth-oriented magazine titles over to his son Ryan Dobson in 2009. He gave his daughter a golden key necklace as a gift when she voiced her commitment to sexual purity at age 10. He encouraged other parents to give similar gifts.

Dobson died at his home in Colorado Springs, Colorado, on August 21, 2025, at the age of 89.

== Awards ==
At the invitation of Presidents and Attorneys General, Dobson has also served on government advisory panels and testified at several government hearings. He was given the "Layman of the Year" award by the National Association of Evangelicals in 1982, "The Children's Friend" honor by Childhelp USA (an advocate agency against child abuse) in 1987, and the Humanitarian Award by the California Psychological Association in 1988. In 2005, Dobson received an honorary doctorate from Indiana Wesleyan University and was inducted into IWU's Society of World Changers, while speaking at the university's Academic Convocation.

In 2008, Dobson's Focus on the Family program was inducted into the National Radio Hall of Fame to controversy from secular listeners opposed to Dobson's views, along with those supporting LGBTQ rights. The National Radio Hall of Fame noted the program's status as an "internationally syndicated radio show heard on over 3,000 radio facilities in North America and in 27 languages in over 160 countries."

== Social views ==
=== Views on marriage ===
James Dobson was a proponent of marriage defined as "one where husband and wife are lawfully married, are committed to each other for life", and have a homemaker mother and breadwinner father. According to his view, women are not inferior to men because both are created in God's image, but each gender has biblically mandated roles. He recommended that married women with children under the age of 18 focus on mothering, rather than work outside the home.

Dobson could be said to have viewed marriage as a transaction in which women exchange sex for protection:

The natural sex appeal of girls serves as their primary source of bargaining power in the game of life. In exchange for feminine affection and love, a man accepts a girl as his lifetime responsibility—supplying her needs and caring for her welfare. This sexual aspect of the marital agreement can hardly be denied.

— James Dobson, Dare to Discipline (1970)

He advised wives to use their social and sexual skills to coerce their husbands into becoming good partners. By doing this, according to Dobson, women would transform male lust into love, and male destructive impulses into useful accomplishments. He regarded heterosexual marriage as the cornerstone of civilization, as women fulfilled their role of civilizing their husbands.

In his 2004 book Marriage Under Fire, Dobson suggested that heterosexual marriage rates in Denmark, Norway, and Sweden was falling due to the recognition of same-sex relationships by those countries during the 1990s. He remarked that the "institution of marriage in those countries is rapidly dying" as a result, with most young people cohabiting or choosing to remain single (living alone) and illegitimacy rates rising in some Norwegian counties up to 80%.

Dobson wrote that "every civilization in the world" had been built upon marriage. He also believed that homosexuality was neither a choice nor genetic, but was caused by external factors during early childhood. He anecdotally cited as evidence the life of actress Anne Heche, who was previously in a relationship with Ellen DeGeneres. Criticizing "the realities of judicial tyranny", Dobson wrote that "[t]here is no issue today that is more significant to our culture than the defense of the family. Not even the war on terror eclipses it."

=== Views on schooling ===
Focus on the Family supports private school vouchers and tax credits for religious schools. According to the Focus on the Family website, Dobson believed that parents were ultimately responsible for their children's education, and encourages parents to visit their children's schools to ask questions and to join the PTA so that they may voice their opinions. Dobson opposed sex education curricula that are not abstinence-only.

According to People for the American Way, Focus on the Family material has been used to challenge a book or curriculum taught in public schools. Critics, such as People for the American Way, allege that Focus on the Family encourages Christian teachers to establish prayer groups in public schools. Dobson supported student-led prayer in public schools, and believed that allowing student-led Christian prayer in schools did not violate the First Amendment to the United States Constitution.

=== Views on discipline of children ===
In his book Dare to Discipline, Dobson advocated the spanking of children as young as fifteen months and up to eight years old when they misbehave, using switches or belts kept on the child's dresser as a reminder of authority. In Dobson's opinion, parents must uphold their authority and do so consistently. Dobson said corporal punishment should end with the child asking for forgiveness and receiving a hug. After the spanking, he believed in having a "heart to heart" talk with a child, which provided an opportunity to re-bond and express love to the child. Though Dare to Discipline was not overtly political, Dobson considered his parenting techniques to be the solution to the social unrest of the 1960s. The book was a rebuttal to Benjamin Spock, whose parenting ideas were more permissive. By returning to the authoritarian parenting style popular in prior eras, Dobson hoped to preserve order, obedience, and social hierarchy. The book quickly sold over two million copies, establishing Dobson as a trusted authority among parents bewildered by the rapid changes of the era.

In The Strong-Willed Child, Dobson drew an analogy between the defiance of a family pet and that of a small child, and concludes that "just as surely as a dog will occasionally challenge the authority of his leaders, so will a little child—only more so." The Strong-Willed Child says that if authority is portrayed correctly to a child, the child will understand how to interact with other authority figures:

By learning to yield to the loving authority... of his parents, a child learns to submit to other forms of authority which will confront him later in his life—his teachers, school principal, police, neighbors and employers.

If allowed to challenge parental authority, Dobson says, children would challenge God's authority when they grew older. Hence, rebellion must be punished to protect the child's salvation. Believing that "pain is a marvelous purifier", Dobson recommended corporal punishment as the most effective way to keep the child subordinate to adults. He believed the parent should model both divine mercy and wrath to prepare the inherently sinful child for a relationship with God. Dobson warned of the dire consequences of failing to discipline one's children: "Eli, the priest, permitted his sons to desecrate the temple. All three were put to death."

He warned against "harsh spanking", as he found it unnecessary to beat a child into submission. In a 1997 book, he warns that "discipline must not be harsh and destructive to the child's spirit." Dobson considers disciplining children to be a necessary but unpleasant part of raising children which should only be carried out by qualified parents:

Anyone who has ever abused a child—or has ever felt himself losing control during a spanking—should not expose the child to that tragedy. Anyone who has a violent temper that at times becomes unmanageable should not use that approach. Anyone who secretly 'enjoys' the administration of corporal punishment should not be the one to implement it.

When asked "How long do you think a child should be allowed to cry after being punished? Is there a limit?" Dobson responded:

Yes, I believe there should be a limit. As long as the tears represent a genuine release of emotion, they should be permitted to fall. But crying quickly changes from inner sobbing to an expression of protest... Real crying usually lasts two minutes or less but may continue for five. After that point, the child is merely complaining, and the change can be recognized in the tone and intensity of his voice. I would require him to stop the protest crying, usually by offering him a little more of whatever caused the original tears. In younger children, crying can easily be stopped by getting them interested in something else.

Sociologists John Bartkowski and Christopher Ellison have stated that Dobson's views "diverge sharply from those recommended by contemporary mainstream experts" and are not based on any sort of empirical testing, but rather are nothing more than expressions of his religious doctrines of "biblical literalism and 'authority-mindedness.'" In the 1980s, Penelope Leach wrote that Dobson's approach was ineffective because, rather than establishing parental authority, spanking only communicates parental frustration and weakness.

Although childrearing experts have discredited corporal punishment, Dobson did not change his views. In 2015, he wrote that, when spanking fails to make a child obey, the problem may be that the parent is not hitting hard enough or frequently enough.

=== Views on tolerance and diversity ===
In the winter of 2004–2005, the We Are Family Foundation sent American elementary schools approximately 60,000 copies of a free DVD using popular cartoon characters (especially SpongeBob SquarePants) to "promote tolerance and diversity". Dobson contended that tolerance and diversity were "buzzwords" that the We Are Family Foundation misused as part of a "hidden agenda" to promote homosexuality. Kate Zernik pointed out Dobson asserting: "tolerance and its first cousin, diversity, 'are almost always buzzwords for homosexual advocacy.'" He said on the Focus on the Family website that "childhood symbols are apparently being hijacked to promote an agenda that involves teaching homosexual propaganda to children." He offered as evidence the association of many leading LGBTQ rights organizations, including GLAAD, GLSEN, HRC, and PFLAG, with the We Are Family Foundation as shown by links which he claims once existed on their website.

The We Are Family Foundation countered that Dobson had mistaken their organization with "an unrelated Web site belonging to another group called 'We Are Family', which supports gay youth." Dobson countered:

I want to be clear: the We Are Family Foundation—the organization that sponsored the video featuring SpongeBob and the other characters was, until this flap occurred, making available a variety of explicitly pro-homosexual materials on its Web site. It has since endeavored to hide that fact, but my concerns are as legitimate today as they were when I first expressed them in January.

In September 2005, Tolerance.org published a follow-up message advertising the DVD's continued availability, including We Are Family Foundation president Nancy Hunt's speculation that many of the DVDs may be "still sitting in boxes, unused, because of Dobson's vitriolic attack".

=== Views on homosexuality ===
In Dobson's view, homosexuality results from influences in a child's environment rather than an inborn trait. He said that homosexual behavior, specifically "unwanted same-sex attraction", has been and can be "overcome" through understanding developmental models for homosexuality and choosing to heal the complex developmental issues which led to same-sex attraction.

Focus on the Family ministry sponsored the monthly conference Love Won Out, where participants hear "powerful stories of ex-gay men and women". Parents, Families and Friends of Lesbians and Gays (P-FLAG) protested against the conference in Orlando, questioning both its methodology and supposed success. In regards to the conference, Dobson stated that

Gay activists come with preconceived notions about who we are and what we believe and about the hate that boils from within, which is simply not true. Regardless of what the media might say, Focus on the Family has no interest in promoting hatred toward homosexuals or anyone else. We also don't wish to deprive them of their basic constitutional rights. The Constitution applies to all of us.

Dobson strongly opposed the movement to legitimize same-sex marriages. In his book Bringing Up Boys, Dobson stated,

[T]he disorder is not typically 'chosen.' Homosexuals deeply resent being told that they selected this same-sex inclination in pursuit of sexual excitement or some other motive. It is unfair, and I don't blame them for being irritated by that assumption. Who among us would knowingly choose a path that would result in alienation from family, rejection by friends, disdain from the heterosexual world, exposure to sexually transmitted diseases such as AIDS and tuberculosis, and even a shorter lifespan?

Critics have stated that Dobson's views on homosexuality do not represent the mainstream views of the mental health community, with Dan Gilgoff referring to the positions of the American Psychiatric Association and the American Psychological Association on homosexuality. Sociologist Judith Stacey criticized Dobson for claiming that sociological studies show that gay couples do not make good parents. She stated that Dobson's claim "is a direct misrepresentation of my research".

Dobson objected to a bill expanding the prohibition of sexual orientation-based discrimination in the areas of "public accommodation, housing practices, family planning services and twenty other areas". He said that, were such a bill passed, public businesses could no longer separate locker rooms and bathrooms by gender, which he claimed would lead to a situation where "every woman and little girl will have to fear that a predator, bisexual, cross-dresser or even a homosexual or heterosexual male might walk in and relieve himself in their presence".

In 2017, Dobson was among the first to sign the Nashville Statement, written by the Council on Biblical Manhood and Womanhood. The statement specifies conservative evangelical views on gender roles and sexuality, condemning LGBTQ-affirming Christians: "We affirm that it is sinful to approve of homosexual immorality or transgenderism and that such approval constitutes an essential departure from Christian faithfulness and witness."

=== Views on mass shootings ===
In 2012, in a broadcast titled "A Nation Shaken by the Sandy Hook Tragedy", Dobson said that the mass shooting was a judgment by God because of American acceptance of gay marriage and legal abortion. Similarly, Dobson said the 2019 El Paso shooting and mass shootings in general happen because "the LGBTQ movement is closing in on the God-inspired and established institution of the family."

=== Views on abortion ===
Early in his career, Dobson appeared to accept abortion. He wrote a forward for a 1973 book, Sex is a Parent Affair, that takes a nonjudgmental stance toward abortion because "the Bible is silent on the subject" except for some interpretations of Exodus 21:22–23 which "may indicate a developing embryo or fetus was not regarded as a full human being". In general, the evangelical movement did not speak much about abortion until the 1980s.

Starting in the 1980s, Dobson became a major force in the anti-abortion movement. His message centered upon biblically moral mothers who sacrificed for their children; he chastised unmarried mothers or "rebellious", believing pregnancy to be a sacred duty. He broadcast interviews with women who kept pregnancies because their trust in God overcame their own emotions and desires. Dobson contended that abortion invites women to reject God, diverts women from their natural role as mothers, and prevents more Christians from coming into the world. Ending abortion, in his view, would redeem society by binding women to their divine role. Focus on the Family and its allied lobbying organizations are among the US's most powerful advocates for restrictions on abortion access.

=== Views on gender ===
Dobson viewed the gender binary as fundamental to humanity; he believed God created men and women to differ "in every cell of their bodies". The complementary differences make them well-suited to traditional gender roles. "Males and females differ biochemically, anatomically, and emotionally", according to Dobson. Men like to "hunt and fish and hike in the wilderness" while women prefer to "stay at home and wait for them". Because men have a fragile ego and women are emotionally vulnerable, "men derive self-esteem by being respected; women feel worthy when they are loved." Men and women are obligated to adhere to the "time-honored roles of protector and protected". The effects of hormonal differences, he argues, make women more suited for the home.

Dobson argued that confused gender relationships in a household result in homosexuality if a child displaces their sexual feelings onto the same-sex parent. Hence, parents should model a romance-like relationship with their opposite-sex child, according to Dobson, with the ultimate goal of steering the child toward heterosexual marriage as an adult.

Dobson encouraged "daddy–daughter dating" in which fathers and daughters set aside time for special activities together. Because he believed heterosexuality must be cultivated, Dobson intended these romanticized attachments to model proper heterosexual partnership to girls age six or younger. An employee of Dobson's created the first purity ball—a father-daughter dance event promoting female chastity—in 1998. Dobson promoted the purity balls on his radio show. Along with other fundamentalist figures such as Billy Graham, Dobson is considered a founder of purity culture, a Christian subculture in which sexual immorality by women or LGBTQ people is considered a national threat.

Dobson considered transgender people a threat, writing in 2016 that "a married man with any gumption" would defend his wife's privacy in the bathroom from "a strange-looking man, dressed like a woman". He also considered feminists a threat because they question the natural leadership of men. In his 1975 book What Wives Wish Their Husbands Knew About Women he denounces the "feminist propaganda" of strong female characters in movies, complaining when men are shown as inferior to a "confident superchick".

==== Gendered language in the Bible ====
In response to a 1997 article in World magazine claiming that the New International Version of the Bible was going to be printed with gender-neutral language, Dobson called a meeting at Focus on the Family headquarters of influential men in the religious publishing business. The group drafted the Colorado Springs Guidelines, which require Bible translations to use male-default language such as the word man to designate the human race. As a result, plans for the gender-neutral Bible version were halted. When Dobson discovered his own Odyssey Bible used gender-neutral language, he discontinued it and offered refunds. According to World, Dobson's 1997 meeting eventually led to the publication of the English Standard Version in 2001, which avoids gender-neutral language. Along with over a hundred other evangelical figures, in 2002 Dobson opposed publication of Today's New International Version because of the "political correctness" of the translation and the publisher's rejection of the Colorado Springs Guidelines.

== Political and social influence ==
Dobson's social and political opinions were widely read among many evangelical church congregations in the United States, and he accrued substantial influence in the Republican Party. Among other conservative causes, his lobbying significantly contributed to numerous state-level bans on same-sex marriage.

=== Social influence ===
Dobson's books on corporal punishment helped to legitimize the practice, providing it with theological grounding for Christian readers. When opposition to physical discipline became widespread in the 1980s and 1990s in American society, conservative Protestants emerged as perhaps the most ardent remaining supporters of corporal punishment. This support was bolstered by "authority-centered" parenting techniques advised in Dobson's books.

Dobson frequently cautioned parents to use corporal punishment in a limited way. Theologian Donald Eric Capps and psychologist Adah Maurer argued in the 1990s that, in practice, parents frequently use indiscriminate violence against children. They argue Dobson's work provides parents with self-serving theological rationalizations for their violent outbursts. Capps and Maurer conclude that the popularity of corporal punishment in this era damaged children in ways that may last into adulthood.

Throughout his career at Focus on the Family, Dobson argued for gender role instruction. He believed that gender and sexuality were not fixed from birth, but required careful cultivation. He sought to provide boys with outlets for their natural aggression, and to teach girls how to develop romantic partnerships, which they use to channel and refine male destructive impulses into civilized behavior. Thus the feminist and LGBTQ rights movements, because they seek to disturb gender roles, are a threat not only to family harmony but to national strength. To preserve pious gender roles, Dobson distributed Christian-targeted psychological advice. His daily radio program Focus on the Family was (according to his organization) broadcast in more than a dozen languages and on over 7,000 stations worldwide, and reportedly heard daily by more than 220 million people in 164 countries.

During the 1960s and 1970s effort to legalize abortion, journalism often reported the plight of women in need of abortion, such as Sherri Finkbine. Dobson, together with Francis Schaeffer and others, shifted the public conversation away from the suffering of women, toward the suffering of the fetus and the selfishness of women who seek abortion.

Through his books and broadcasts, Dobson sought to prepare parents to fight in the American culture wars, a conflict in which Dobson described that "parents of faith are at war with culture" and which he labeled a "Civil War of Values". Dobson wielded significant influence over parents and politically conservative Christians, and, in the 1990s, a reportedly significant segment of this dedicated following were women who worked inside the home.

Around two thousand radio stations aired Dobson's program to an audience of six to ten million by the early 2000s. With over two million addresses on his mailing list, his organization launched a publishing house. Richard Land called him "the most influential evangelical leader in America" at that time, saying his influence was comparable to Billy Graham in the 1960s and 1970s.

He was a founder of purity culture, a nationwide chastity movement through which he significantly shaped American attitudes about sex and gender, and Alliance Defending Freedom. Dobson was a member of the Council on Biblical Manhood and Womanhood. He supported the evangelical men's parachurch organization Promise Keepers and contributed to their 1994 book The Seven Promises of a Promise Keeper.

=== Political influence ===
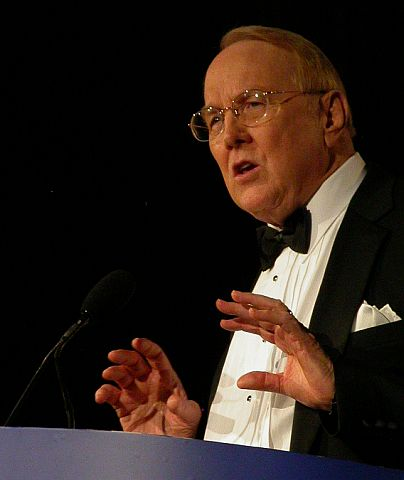
Dobson at the Values Voter Summit in Washington, D.C., October 2007

Dobson chose to exercise political influence behind the scenes, as a "political fixer". It may have helped him maintain his credibility with his audience. He never ran for office or acted as the public head of a primarily political organization.

Starting in 1980, Dobson built a network of conservative activists. In 1981, he founded the Family Research Council as a political arm through which "social conservative causes" could achieve greater political influence. Dobson was appointed by U.S. President Ronald Reagan to the National Advisory Committee on Juvenile Justice and Delinquency Prevention in 1982, where he served for two years. Through the 1980s, he coordinated the creation of Family Policy Councils in most US states, lobbying organizations that act on the level of state politics.

By the 1990s, Dobson had amassed a sizable network of conservative politicians, many of whom he met with regularly. Beginning in the same decade, Dobson and his vast activist organization helped pass state-level bans on gay marriage across the US. His top legislative goal was prohibiting gay marriage at the federal level, with a constitutional amendment. In 2005, he told his biographer "my greatest concern is for the relentless attack by homosexual activists who are determined to destroy the institution of marriage."

Dobson was an ally of Judge Roy Moore starting in the early 1990s. He rallied his audience in support of the judge in 1997 and again in 2003 because of the Moore's refusal to remove a Ten Commandments display from the Alabama Judicial Building. Viewing Moore as "a man of proven character and integrity" Dobson endorsed Moore's political campaigns until 2017, when allegations came to light of Moore's sexual misconduct toward teen girls.

In late 2004, Dobson led a campaign to block the appointment of Arlen Specter to head of the Senate Judiciary Committee because of Specter's pro-abortion rights stance. Responding to a question by Fox News personality Alan Colmes on whether he wanted the Republican Party to be known as a "big-tent party", he replied, "I don't want to be in the big tent ... I think the party ought to stand for something." In 2006, Focus on the Family spent more than a half million dollars to promote a constitutional amendment to ban same-sex marriage in its home state of Colorado.

Dobson founded a fundraising and lobbying arm of FotF called Focus on the Family Action, now called Family Policy Alliance. As a 501(c)(4) organization, it faces fewer IRS restrictions on political activity than FotF. In the organization's first six months of existence, it raised nearly nine million dollars in support of six Republican candidates for competitive US Senate seats. All six won their races. A May 2005 article by Chris Hedges in Harper's Magazine described Dobson as "perhaps the most powerful figure in the Dominionist movement" and "a crucial player in getting out the Christian vote for George W. Bush".

In November 2004, Dobson was described by the online magazine Slate as "America's most influential evangelical leader". The article stated "Forget Jerry Falwell and Pat Robertson, who in their dotage have marginalized themselves with gaffes ... Dobson is now America's most influential evangelical leader, with a following reportedly greater than that of either Falwell or Robertson at his peak ... Dobson may have delivered Bush his victories in Ohio and Florida." Further, "He's already leveraging his new power. When a thank-you call came from the White House, Dobson issued the staffer a blunt warning that Bush "needs to be more aggressive" about pressing the religious right's anti-abortion, anti-gay rights agenda, or it would "pay a price in four years". Dobson sometimes complained that the Republican Party may take the votes of social conservatives for granted, and has suggested that evangelicals may withhold support from the GOP if the party does not more strongly support conservative family issues.

However, in 2006, Dobson said that, while "there is disillusionment out there with Republicans" and "that worries me greatly", he nonetheless suggested voters turn out and vote Republican in 2006. "My first inclination was to sit this one out", but according to The New York Times, Dobson then added that "he had changed his mind when he looked at who would become the leaders of Congressional committees if the Democrats took over."

Dobson garnered national media attention once again in February 2008 after releasing a statement in the wake of Senator John McCain's expected success in the so-called "Super Tuesday" Republican primary elections. In his statement, Dobson said: "I cannot, and will not, vote for Senator John McCain, as a matter of conscience", and indicated that he would refrain from voting altogether if McCain were to become the Republican candidate, echoing other conservative commentators' concerns about the Senator's conservatism. He endorsed Mike Huckabee for president. After McCain selected an anti-abortion candidate, Sarah Palin, as his running mate, Dobson said that he was more enthusiastic in his support for the Republican ticket. When Palin's 17-year-old daughter's pregnancy was revealed, Dobson issued a press release commending Palin's stance, saying,

We have always encouraged the parents to love and support their children and always advised the girls to see their pregnancies through, even though there will of course be challenges along the way. That is what the Palins are doing, and they should be commended once again for not just talking about their pro-life and pro-family values, but living them out even in the midst of trying circumstances.

On June 24, 2008, Dobson criticized statements made by U.S. presidential candidate Barack Obama in Obama's 2006 "Call to Renewal" address. Dobson said that Obama was "distorting the traditional understanding of the Bible to fit his own world view". On October 23, 2008, Dobson published a "Letter from 2012 in Obama's America" that proposed that an Obama presidency could lead to: mandated homosexual teachings across all schools; the banning of firearms in entire states; the end of the Boy Scouts, home schooling, Christian school groups, Christian adoption agencies, and talk radio; pornography on prime-time and daytime television; mandatory bonuses for gay soldiers; terrorist attacks across America; the nuclear bombing of Tel Aviv; the conquering of most of Eastern Europe by Russia; the end of health care for Americans over 80; out-of-control gasoline prices; and complete economic disaster in the United States, among other catastrophes. In the days after the 2008 presidential election, Dobson stated on his radio program that he was mourning the Obama election, claiming that Obama supported infanticide, would be responsible for the deaths of millions of unborn children, and was "going to appoint the most liberal justices to the Supreme Court, perhaps, that we've ever had".

Dobson supported intelligent design and spoke at conferences on the subject frequently criticizing evolution. In 2007, he was one of 25 evangelicals who called for the ouster of Richard Cizik from his position at the National Association of Evangelicals because Cizik had taken a stance urging evangelicals to take global warming seriously.

On June 13, 2007, the National Right to Life Committee ousted Colorado Right to Life after the latter ran a full-page ad criticizing Dobson. On May 30, 2010, Dobson delivered the pre-race invocation at the NASCAR Coca-Cola 600 automobile race, raising criticism about his association with a sport associated with sponsors and activities which would not meet his definition of family-friendly.

At a National Day of Prayer event in the U.S. Capitol, Dobson called Barack Obama "the abortion president". He said, "President Obama, before he was elected, made it very clear that he wanted to be the abortion president. He didn't make any bones about it. This is something that he really was going to promote and support, and he has done that, and in a sense he is the abortion president." Among others, Rep. Janice Hahn complained because Dobson used the National Day of Prayer for partisan purposes. She said, "Dobson just blew a hole into this idea of being a nonpartisan National Day of Prayer. It was very disturbing to me ... and really a shame. James Dobson hijacked the National Day of Prayer—this nonpartisan, nonpolitical National Day of Prayer—to promote his own distorted political agenda."

Dobson endorsed Ted Cruz in the 2016 Republican primaries as well as Trump in the general election against Hillary Clinton. In 2016, Dobson was one of the Trump Administration's evangelical faith advisors. In 2020, Dobson worked alongside other conservative evangelicals and evangelical organizations, including Jim Daly and Focus on the Family, to support the reelection of President Donald Trump. He echoed his support of Trump throughout the impeachment proceedings earlier that year.

Dobson praised the 2022 U.S. Supreme Court case Dobbs v. Jackson Women's Health Organization, which overruled Roe v. Wade and Planned Parenthood v. Casey, saying, "Praise God! We have just received the news for which we have been praying and working!"

== Ecumenical relations ==
Dobson and Charles Colson participated in a 2000 conference at the Vatican on the global economy's impact on families. During the conference, the two Protestants met with Pope John Paul II. Dobson later told the Catholic News Service that although he had theological differences with Roman Catholicism, "when it comes to the family, there is far more agreement than disagreement, and with regard to moral issues from abortion to premarital sex, safe-sex ideology and homosexuality, I find more in common with Catholics than with some of my evangelical brothers and sisters."

In November 2009, Dobson signed an ecumenical statement known as the Manhattan Declaration calling on evangelicals, Catholics and Eastern Orthodox Christians not to comply with rules and laws permitting abortion, same-sex marriage and other matters that go against their religious consciences.

== Criticism ==
U.S. Surgeon General C. Everett Koop, a fellow evangelical Christian who wanted Dobson as an ally in his battle to stem the AIDS crisis, was deeply disappointed when Dobson embraced pseudoscientific and homophobic claims about AIDS. "The Christian activity in reference to AIDS of both D. James Kennedy and Jim Dobson is reprehensible", Koop said in 1989. He viewed the AIDS crisis as "an opportunity for Christian service" which Dobson was squandering.

In her 2020 book Jesus and John Wayne, Kristin Kobes Du Mez, a professor at Calvin University in Grand Rapids, Michigan criticizes the ideal of Christian masculinity created by Dobson, Mark Driscoll and others: "It was a vision that promised protection for women but left women without defense, one that worshiped power and turned a blind eye to justice, and one that transformed the Jesus of the Gospels into an image of their own making."

Gil Alexander-Moegerle, a former Focus on the Family executive and radio show co-host, wrote the highly critical book James Dobson's War on America in 1997. In it, he says that Dobson's loving, caring public persona is a sham; the real Dobson is racist, sexist, homophobic, materialistic, power-hungry, and shameless. He says that the Nazarene religious concept of entire sanctification is key to understanding Dobson's views: "James Dobson believes that he has been entirely sanctified, morally perfected, that he does not and cannot sin. Now you know why he and moralists like him make a life of condemning what he believes to be the sins of others. He is perfect."

Some fundamentalist Christians consider Dobson a heretic for presenting secular concepts from psychology and self-help literature as though they are justified by the Bible.

Theologian Donald Eric Capps contends that Dobson's corporal punishment techniques exploit children by turning their natural need to be loved against them. Dobson's advice to "break the will" of the child is a recipe for child abuse, according to Capps, and is antithetical to loving one's child. Capps also argues that corporal punishment may sexualize children. For evidence of this, he points to Dobson's vivid childhood recollection of being beaten with his mother's girdle. Capps believed that using physical pain to heighten a child's relationship to God is "perverted".

Dobson has been criticized for recommending conversion therapy advocate Joseph Nicolosi's methods of preventing homosexuality in children, including quoting Nicolosi's suggestion that "[a] boy's father ... to mirror and affirm his son's maleness ... can even take his son with him into the shower, where the boy cannot help but notice that Dad has a penis, just like his, only bigger."

Stephens and Giberson note, "The American Medical Association, the American Psychiatric Association, and the American Association of Marriage and Family Therapy have long rejected many of Dobson's views."

== Publications ==
Dobson authored or co-authored 36 books including:

=== Books as sole author ===
- Dobson, James C. (1970). Dare to Discipline. Tyndale House. ISBN 0-842-3063-0-7.
- Dobson, James C. (1975). What Wives Wish Their Husbands Knew About Women. Tyndale House. ISBN 0-84237-8960.
- Dobson, James (1980). Preparing for Adolescence. Vision House. ISBN 0-88449-112-9.
- Dobson, James (1982). Dr. Dobson Answers Your Questions About Raising Children. Tyndale House. ISBN 0-8423-0620-X.
- Dobson, James C. (1984). Emotions: Can You Trust Them?. Bantam Books. ISBN 0-553-25751-X.
- Dobson, James C. (1986). Dr. Dobson Answers Your Questions about Feelings and Self-Esteem. Tyndale House. ISBN 0-8423-0621-8.
- Dobson, James C. (1986). Temper Your Child's Tantrums. Tyndale House. ISBN 0-8423-6994-5.
- Dobson, James (1987). Parenting Isn't for Cowards: Dealing Confidently With the Frustrations of Child-Rearing. Word. ISBN 0-8499-0630-X.
- Dobson, James C. (1992). The Strong-Willed Child. Living Books. ISBN 0-8423-2335-X.
- Dobson, James (1995). Straight Talk: What Men Should Know, What Women Need to Understand —Rev.and exp.ed. Thomas Nelson. ISBN 0-8499-3858-9.
- Dobson, James C. (1996). The New Dare to Discipline. Tyndale House. ISBN 0-8423-0506-8.
- Dobson, James C. (1997). Solid Answers. Tyndale House. ISBN 0-8423-0623-4.
- Dobson, James C. (2000). The Complete Marriage and Family Home Reference Guide. Tyndale House. ISBN 0-8423-5267-8.
- Dobson, James (2000). Straight Talk to Men. Thomas Nelson. ISBN 0-8499-4210-1.
- Dobson, James (2000). Life on the Edge. Thomas Nelson. ISBN 0-8499-0927-9.
- Dobson, James (2001). The New Hide or Seek: Building Confidence in Your Child. Revell. ISBN 0-8007-5680-0.
- Dobson, James C. (2001). When God Doesn't Make Sense. Living Books. ISBN 0-8423-7062-5.
- Dobson, James C. (2002). Bringing Up Boys: Practical Advice and Encouragement for Those Shaping the Next Generation of Men. Tyndale House. ISBN 0-8423-5266-X.
- Dobson, James C. (2003). Parents' Answer Book. Living Books. ISBN 0-8423-8716-1.
- Dobson, James C. (2004). Romantic Love: How to Be Head Over Heels and Still Land on Your Feet. Regal Books. ISBN 0-8307-3238-1.
- Dobson, James (2004). Dr. James Dobson on Parenting. World Publishing. ISBN 0-88486-339-5.
- Dobson, James (2004). Love for a Lifetime: Building a Marriage That Will Go the Distance. Multnomah Books. ISBN 1-59052-087-4.
- Dobson, James C. (2007). Love Must Be Tough: New Hope for Families in Crisis. Tyndale House. ISBN 978-1-4143-1745-8.
- Dobson, James C. (2007). The New Strong-Willed Child. Tyndale House. ISBN 978-1-4143-1363-4.
- Dobson, James C. (2007). Stories of Heart and Home. Tyndale House. ISBN 978-1-4143-1747-2.
- Dobson, James C. (2010). Bringing Up Girls: Practical Advice and Encouragement for Those Shaping the Next Generation of Women. Tyndale House. ISBN 978-1-77036-544-5.

=== Books with others ===
- Paul C. Reisser (October 1, 1999). Melissa R. Cox; Vinita Hampton Wright (eds.). The Focus on the Family Complete Book of Baby and Child Care. Tyndale House. ISBN 0-8423-3512-9. (Foreword)
- Sutherland, Mark I.; William J. Federer; Roy Moore; James Dobson; Alan Keyes; Ed Meese; Phyllis Schlafly; Matthew D. Staver; Alan E. Sears (July 4, 2005). Judicial Tyranny The New Kings of America. Amerisearch. ISBN 0-9753455-6-7.
- Dobson, James C.; Shirley Dobson (April 16, 2007). Marriage Under Fire: Why We Must Win This Battle. Tyndale House. ISBN 978-1-4143-1756-4.
- Dobson, James C.; Shirley Dobson (April 16, 2007). Night Light A Devotional for Couples. Tyndale House. ISBN 978-1-4143-1749-6.
- Dobson, James C.; Shirley Dobson (April 20, 2007). Night Light for Parents A Devotional. Tyndale House. ISBN 978-1-4143-1751-9.
- Dobson, James C; Kurt Bruner (January 15, 2013). Fatherless. FaithWords. ISBN 978-1-4555-1311-6.
- Dobson, James C; Kurt Bruner (October 1, 2013). Childless. FaithWords. ISBN 978-1-4555-1315-4.
- Dobson, James C; Kurt Bruner (May 6, 2014). Godless. FaithWords. ISBN 978-1-4555-1316-1.

=== Notable articles and reports ===
- Dobson served on the committee which wrote the Meese Report on pornography.
- Dobson, James C. (December 12, 2006). "Two Mommies Is One Too Many". Time. Archived from the original on December 13, 2006.
