= Joel Webbon =

American Christian nationalist

- Born: 1986 (age 35-36)
- Occupations: Pastor; Political commentator; Author
- Employer: Covenant Bible Church
- Movement: Christian nationalism

Joel Webbon (born 1986) is an American far-right minister, political commentator and author. He is a self-described "patriarchal" pastor based in Georgetown, Texas known for espousing racist, misogynistic, anti-LGBTQ+, xenophobic, Islamophobic and antisemitic views, including Holocaust denial. As of 2024, he was one of the most prominent voices of the TheoBros online community.

Commonly described as a Christian nationalist, he has advocated for women losing the right to vote, called for the mass deportation of Black immigrants, and said that "marrying white women is not a universal right."

== Career ==
Webbon is the founder and co-host of the Right Response Ministries podcast and is also a senior pastor at Covenant Bible Church in Georgetown, Texas.

Bob Smietana, writing for Religion News Service, includes Webbon in his list of "Jim Crow theobros", and suggests that Webbon has turned his YouTube channel "into a bullhorn for Christian nationalism, antisemitism and white supremacy."

== Political positions ==
=== Women ===
A video of Webbon giving an hour-long sermon was posted to YouTube on September 30, 2024, with the title "So The Rest May Stand In Fear". During the sermon, he discusses how Deuteronomy 19 notes that if someone is falsely accused of a crime, then the accuser should face a punishment that is equivalent to the crime described, in order to prevent others from making false accusations. He then argues that it should be the law of the land in every country. Shifting his focus towards the United States, Webbon suggests that the #MeToo movement would "End Real Fast" if a few women who lied were publicly executed.

Webbon has said that he would change the voting system so that males such as brothers, fathers, and husbands, would vote on behalf of the family.

=== Race ===
On an episode of his podcast in 2024, Webbon said that while looking for a new cardiologist following his move to Texas, he was faced with the choice of either choosing a young Black doctor or a young White doctor and ultimately chose the White one. He explained his reasoning saying, "If there was a chance that one of them was not qualified and given a free pass, it'd be the Black guy".

In September 2025, Webbon took to his podcast to urge White parents to have "the talk" about race with their children. He started the episode off by mentioning the case of Iryna Zarutska, a Ukrainian immigrant who was fatally stabbed on a subway train in Charlotte, North Carolina. He then uses the story as an explanation for why "the talk" is necessary and urges white parents to "steer away" from "certain places and people", arguing that a crowd of Black strangers is "30 times" more dangerous than a crowd of White people. Webbon then claims that White parents are failing their parental duty if they teach their children that people of all races are the same, arguing that they are depriving their child of "factual" and "truthful" information that could save their life.

In October 2025, on an episode of his podcast Webbon argued that Black people should "see slavery as a blessing" because without it they would "live in a grass hut" adding that, reparations for them are simply getting to live in America. In the same episode he went on to say, "The greatest moment in history for any brown or Black country is the moment that the White man's ships arrive at your shore". Webbon argued that he (the white man) brings hospitals and medicine, as well as increases to life expectancy, GDP, and resources, and most importantly according to Webbon, the gospel of Jesus Christ "so that you can live longer on Earth and then go to Heaven instead of Hell". He continued on saying that White European history does not involve sin because non-European people have been "worshipping demons" while white people were "building cathedrals".

=== Immigration ===
In a two-hour episode of his podcast which was posted on November 13, 2024, Webbon called for extreme immigration enforcement measures. He called for a halt on all immigration, including legal immigration for the next 20 to 25 years. He also said that the United States needs a border wall, and that there should be guys standing on top of it. Webbon added that that if someone begins approaching the wall they can be given a warning to "back away" and that "if they don't listen to the warning they need to be shot and killed".

=== Antisemitism ===
In 2024, Webbon shared a video from pro-Adolf Hitler content creator entitled "White Boy Summer" that featured pro-Nazi imagery. Webbon subsequently claimed that he had “shared the Samuel Holden video without watching closely" and that he condemns “both Nazis and Bolsheviks/Communists. However, the latter is by far a more present threat today.”

In 2025, Webbon's pinned post on X said that “those of Jewish descent are generally marked by subversion, deceit, and greed.” Webbon said on the show of Holocaust denier Elijah Schaffer that “A decent degree of anti-Semitism is related to Jewish behavior.”

In 2026, Webbon invited neo-Nazi commentator Nick Fuentes onto his show. Webbon told Fuentes “a lot of money, a lot of time, a lot of writing, a lot of effort has gone into, you know, to really building upon, you know, and solidifying this myth that that Hitler was the worst person to ever live, and the fascism is the scariest thing that there’s ever been…. I just don’t find it compelling that he’s the worst guy ever, you know.” Webbon said that the Holocaust was "probably not as bad as we’ve been told,” and that Hitler “didn’t even know necessarily some of the things that were going on.”

Webbon delivered a speech at the "Christ is King: America After Trump” conference in Irving, Texas in November 2026 that CNN said was "rife with antisemitism, racism, and misogyny." Webbon said that “We’re done with equality. Christianity is American. Islam is not, Hinduism is not, Judaism is not.” The conference, which featured Nick Fuentes, was sponsored by NXR Studios, an organization run by Webbon.

=== Feud with Mike Huckabee ===
In a post on X, Webbon expressed support for the planned public execution of mass shooter Nidal Malik Hasan, but also suggested that US ambassador to Israel Mike Huckabee should face the same fate for being a "Judeo-Christian heretic". Huckabee responded by calling for the FBI to arrest Webbon for incitement.

== Publications ==
- The Hyphenated Heresy: Judeo-Christianity

== Bibliography ==
- Butcher, Melissa (January 20, 2026). The trouble with freedom: Love, hate and America’s future. Manchester University Press. doi:10.7765/9781526185426. ISBN 978-1-5261-8542-6.
- Butler, Kiera (July 22, 2025). "Did Christian nationalists prompt Mike Johnson's Epstein flip-flop?". Mother Jones.
- Fox, Mira (August 11, 2025). "The podcasters making antisemitism Christian again". The Forward.
- Fugelsang, John (September 9, 2025). Separation of Church and Hate: A Sane Person's Guide to Taking Back the Bible from Fundamentalists, Fascists, and Flock-Fleecing Frauds. Simon and Schuster. ISBN 978-1-6680-6691-1.
- Giatti, Ian M. (March 14, 2025). "Texas Pastor Joel Webbon claims there's 'no place' for non-Christians in American leadership". www.christianpost.com.
- Howard, Joshua (August 21, 2026). "Unholy Christendom: Christian nationalism, the appropriation of medieval history, and how medievalists can combat online misinformation". postmedieval. doi:10.1057/s41280-026-00427-z. ISSN 2040-5960.
- Moreno-Almeida, Cristina (October 31, 2025). "Of Sleeps and Cycles: Digital Disruptions and the Myth of Awakening". On_Culture (19). doi:10.22029/oc.2025.1515. ISSN 2366-4142.
- Onishi, Bradley B. (September 15, 2026). American Caesar: How Theocrats and Tech Lords Are Turning America into a Monarchy. St. Martin's Publishing Group. ISBN 978-1-250-42791-5.
- Stankorb, Sarah (February 21, 2025). "The Christian Nationalist Plot to Disenfranchise Women Voters". The New Republic. ISSN 0028-6583.
