= Love, Life and Laughter =

Love, Life and Laughter may refer to:

- Love, Life and Laughter (1923 film), a British drama
- Love, Life and Laughter (1934 film), a British comedy drama
