= Jesus and John Wayne =

Book on evangelical masculinity

Jesus and John Wayne: How White Evangelicals Corrupted a Faith and Fractured a Nation
- Editor: Daniel Gerstle
- Author: Kristin Kobes Du Mez
- Language: American English
- Genre: American evangelicalism; Christian nationalism; Masculinity and gender
- Publisher: Liveright Publishing Corporation
- Publication date: 2020
- Publication place: United States of America
- Pages: 356
- ISBN: 1-631-49573-9
- OCLC: 1120090251
- Website: kristindumez.com/books/jesus-and-john-wayne/

Jesus and John Wayne: How White Evangelicals Corrupted a Faith and Fractured a Nation is a book written by Kristin Kobes Du Mez and published by Liveright Publishing Corporation, a division of W. W. Norton & Company. The book covers the history of American evangelicalism and discusses evangelical views on masculinity.

== Background ==
The book was published in 2020 and has been printed in both hard cover and paperback. Du Mez grew up in a community of Dutch immigrants located in Sioux City, Iowa. Her father was a Reformed theologian at Dordt University and her mother was a Dutch immigrant and teacher. Du Mez began writing the book in 2005 when she began teaching at Calvin University. Du Mez was teaching a course on US history and discussing how the American ideal of masculinity has been influenced by politics, economics, and race when two male students introduced her to the John Eldredge book Wild at Heart, which prompted the project. Du Mez later put the project on hold for a few years, and started it again when the Donald Trump Access Hollywood tape was released and evangelicals came to Trump's defense. The book was published by the Liveright Publishing Corporation, a division of W. W. Norton & Company.

The title of the book comes from the Gaither Vocal Band song of the same name.

== Synopsis ==
The book begins by addressing a speech that Donald Trump gave at Dordt University in Sioux Center, Iowa, on January 23, 2016. In the speech, Trump said that he could "stand in the middle of Fifth Avenue and shoot someone" without losing his constituents' loyalties. Du Mez reflects on how she had attended Dordt and participated in worship teams on the same stage that Trump gave the speech.

The book examines white evangelical affinity for Donald Trump. Du Mez explains that white evangelical support for Donald Trump during the 2016 United States presidential election was a continuing trend rather than an exception. The book focuses on the militant masculinity that white evangelicals idealize and how it has manifested in a pattern of abuse among evangelical leaders. Du Mez criticizes mainstream evangelicals such as John Eldredge, John Piper, and James Dobson for advancing the evangelical ideal of militant masculinity.

The book includes a chapter called "Evangelical Mulligans" which discusses various sexual abuse scandals in evangelical circles. It also discusses figures such as Billy Graham and Mark Driscoll.

The book suggests that while white evangelical views on masculinity have always been in tension with the figure of a loving Jesus, they have consistently aligned with a militant John Wayne.

== Reception ==
The book was initially selling at more than 300 hardcover copies every week and by December was selling more than 900 copies a week. The book was later released in paperback, selling more than 100,000 copies and reaching number four on The New York Times Best Seller list of nonfiction paperbacks by July 2021. The book won the 2021 Orwell Award.

Kirkus Reviews called the book "An evangelical-focused anti-Trump book that carries academic weight." Publishers Weekly called the book a "lucid, potent history [that] adds a much needed religious dimension to understanding the ... American right and the rise of Trump."

== See also ==
- Christian support of Donald Trump
- Evangelicalism in the United States
- Muscular Christianity
- The Making of Biblical Womanhood
- Live Laugh Love: The Secret History of White Christian Women and the World They Made
