= Marriage Under Fire =

2004 book by James Dobson

- Author: James Dobson
- Publisher: Multnomah Publishers
- Publication date: 2004
- ISBN: 9781590524312

Marriage Under Fire: Why We Must Win This Battle is a book by Evangelical Christian leader James Dobson, published in 2004 by Multnomah Publishers. The book examines the same-sex marriage movement from an opponent's point of view. Dobson discusses the history of the movement, gives arguments against its influence, advocates for the Federal Marriage Amendment, criticizes what he views as judicial activism, and exhorts opponents to mobilize.
