= Live Laugh Love: The Secret History of White Christian Women and the World They Made =

2026 book by Kristin Kobes Du Mez

- Author: Kristin Kobes Du Mez
- Subject: Women in Evangelical Christianity
- Genre: Non-fiction
- Publisher: Liveright
- Pages: 432
- Website: kristindumez.com

Live Laugh Love: The Secret History of White Christian Women and the World They Made is a 2026 book by historian Kristin Kobes Du Mez about women in Evangelical Christianity.

The book's title is based on the common phrase "Live, Laugh, Love", and ideas which Du Mez traces back to women like Hannah Whitall Smith.

Du Mez explores how the foundation laid by these ideologies has affected politics and religion today, including the rise of Donald Trump. The book also deals with cultural topics such as the tradwife phenomenon and multi-level marketing.

Live Laugh Love follows Du Mez’s 2020 book Jesus and John Wayne, which deals with evangelical views of masculinity.
