= The Medieval Translator =

The Medieval Translator (French Traduire au Moyen Âge) is an annual volume of studies dedicated to translation in the Middle Ages and the study of translation of medieval texts. First published in 1991, it has been published since 1996 by Brepols. The volume comprises a collection of papers read at the Cardiff Conference on the Theory and Practice of Translation in the Middle Ages. The first four volumes were edited solely by Roger Ellis, who is currently a general editor, with C. Batt and R. Tixier.
