= Texas Medieval Association =

The Texas Medieval Association (also known as TEMA) is an organization for medieval studies in Texas.

Since 1986, it has served medievalists not only throughout the state of Texas, but also nationally and internationally through its conferences and publications.

A regional affiliate of the Medieval Academy of America, the Association holds an annual conference each fall somewhere in the state of Texas.

TEMA also sponsors sessions each May at the annual International Congress on Medieval Studies in Kalamazoo, Michigan, as well as each July at the International Medieval Conference in Leeds, England.
