= Kristin Kobes Du Mez =

American historian and author

- Occupations: Historian; Author
- Title: Professor of History and Gender Studies

Academic background
- Education: Dordt University; University of Notre Dame
- Alma mater: University of Notre Dame

Academic work
- Discipline: History; Gender Studies; Urban Studies
- Institutions: Calvin University
- Notable works: Jesus and John Wayne; Live Laugh Love
- Website: www.kristindumez.com

Kristin Kobes Du Mez is an American historian. She is a professor of history and gender studies at Calvin University in Grand Rapids, Michigan.

== Early life and education ==
Du Mez grew up in Iowa, and lived in Tallahassee, Florida, during high school. She earned a Bachelor of Arts degree in history and German in 1997 from Dordt College, followed by a Ph.D. in American history from the University of Notre Dame.

== Academic career ==
Du Mez taught at Williams College and at the Five College Women's Studies Research Center at Mount Holyoke College, both in Massachusetts, before moving to Calvin University in Grand Rapids, Michigan.

Du Mez's first book, A New Gospel for Women: Katharine Bushnell and the Challenge of Christian Feminism, traced the life and theology of Katharine Bushnell.

She has three children.

== Jesus and John Wayne ==
Du Mez's second book, Jesus and John Wayne: How White Evangelicals Corrupted a Faith and Fractured a Nation, published in 2020, argued that American evangelicals have worked for decades to replace the Jesus of the Gospels with an idol of rugged masculinity and Christian nationalism. It received widespread coverage, including in secular media such as The Washington Post and The Boston Globe, as well as Christian outlets such as The Gospel Coalition. In July 2021, it reached number four on The New York Times Best Seller list of nonfiction paperbacks.

=== For Our Daughters ===
On September 12, 2024, Du Mez announced the upcoming release of the film For Our Daughters, directed by Carl Byker, that draws from the last chapter of Jesus and John Wayne, documenting stories of abuse within evangelicalism. The film started streaming on YouTube September 26, 2024.

== Live Laugh Love ==
Du Mez's third book, Live Laugh Love: The Secret History of White Christian Women and the World They Made was released on September 15th, 2026. It explores the Christian white women sub-culture.

== Works ==
- A New Gospel for Women: Katharine Bushnell and the Challenge of Christian Feminism. Oxford University Press: 2015. ISBN 978-0-19-020564-5
- Jesus and John Wayne: How White Evangelicals Corrupted a Faith and Fractured a Nation. Liveright: 2020. ISBN 978-1-63149-573-1
- Live Laugh Love: The Secret History of White Christian Women and the World They Made. Liveright: 2026. ISBN 978-1-324-09097-7

== See also ==
- Beth Allison Barr
