= Premier Christianity =

UK Evangelical Christian Magazine

- Categories: Religion
- Frequency: monthly
- First issue: 1965; 61 years ago
- Company: Premier Media Group
- Country: United Kingdom
- Based in: London
- Language: English
- Website: www.premierchristianity.com
- ISSN: 1747-7395

Premier Christianity is a monthly Evangelical Christian magazine published in the United Kingdom. The magazine was started in 1965 as a newsletter with name Buzz. It was sponsored by the organization Music Gospel Outreach (MGO) and shared a similar youth-focus with MGO and the soon arriving Jesus movement and the popularity of Jesus music, which boosted evangelical youth culture in the United Kingdom.

Reaching a circulation of 31,500 in 1980, Buzz became the best-selling Christian news publication in the United Kingdom. In October 1988, publishers Elm House Christian communications, based in New Malden, Surrey relaunched the magazine as Twenty First Century Christian. Circulation fell to only 18,000 by 1989.

The name was subsequently changed to Alpha as the youth-focused publishing enterprise reoriented towards an adult audience. Youthwork magazine was launched as a supplement to Alpha and became its own independent magazine in 1992.

Acquired by Trinity Square in 1996, Alpha was rebranded Christianity.

Premier Media Group acquired Christianity in 1999. In 2001, the new publishers merged the magazine with Renewal, which they also owned, titling the combined publication Christianity and Renewal. The title changed back to Christianity in 2004 and then was updated again to Premier Christianity in 2014.
