= Christian support of Donald Trump =

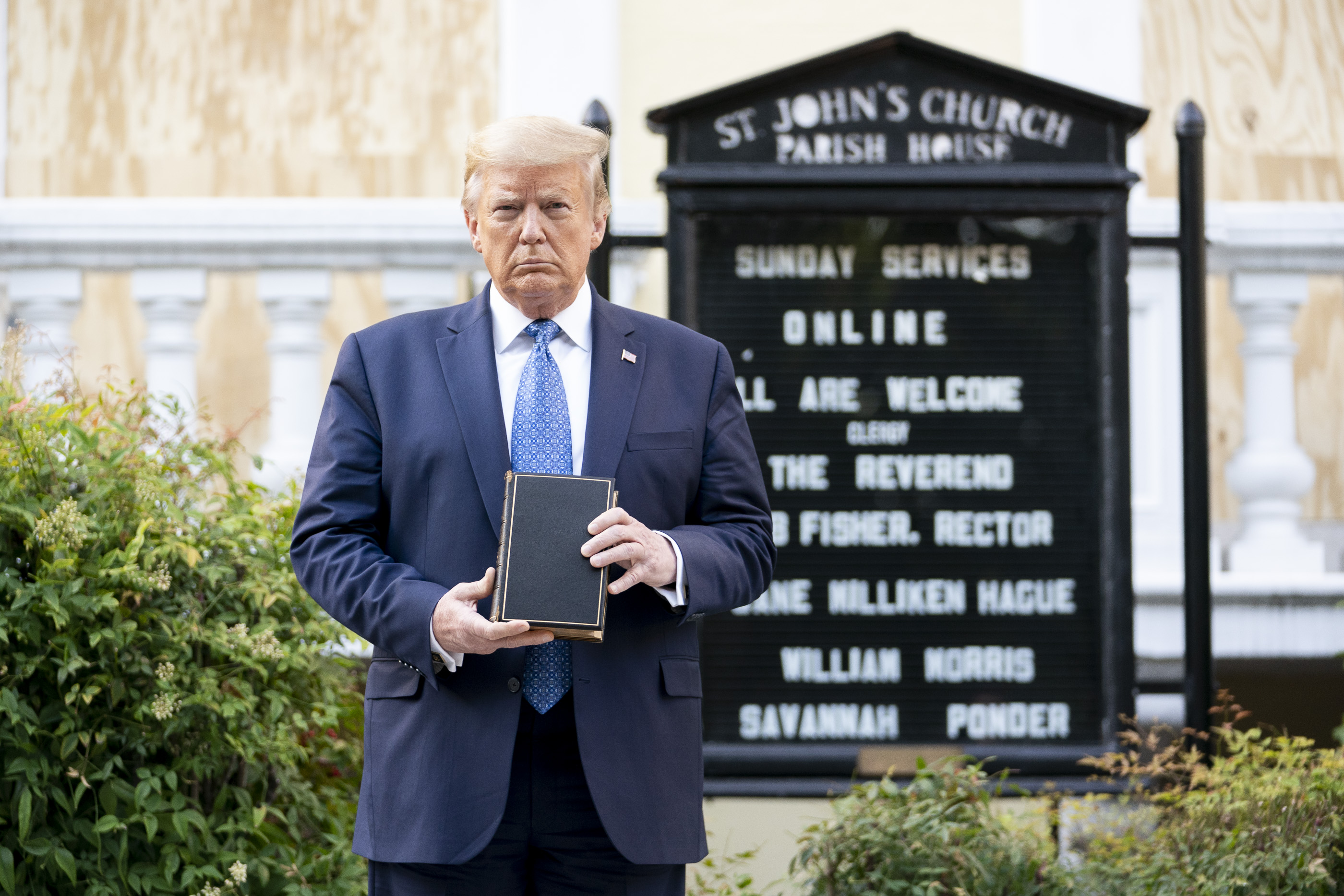
During the 2020 George Floyd protests, Trump held a photo-op at St. John's Episcopal Church, which had been defaced the night before. Law enforcement controversially cleared a path, using riot control tactics, for Trump to walk from the White House to the church. For more information, see Donald Trump photo op at St. John's Church.

Donald Trump, the 45th and 47th president of the United States, has strong support among white evangelical Christians, particularly among those who do not attend church regularly. Trump also maintains strong support with Christian nationalists, and his rallies take on the symbols, rhetoric and agenda of Christian nationalism. Trump described his 2024 presidential campaign as a "righteous crusade" against "atheists, globalists and the Marxists".

== Characteristics ==
On August 21, 2019, while gaggling with reporters at the White House, President Trump proclaims "I am the chosen one" and looks up at the sky.

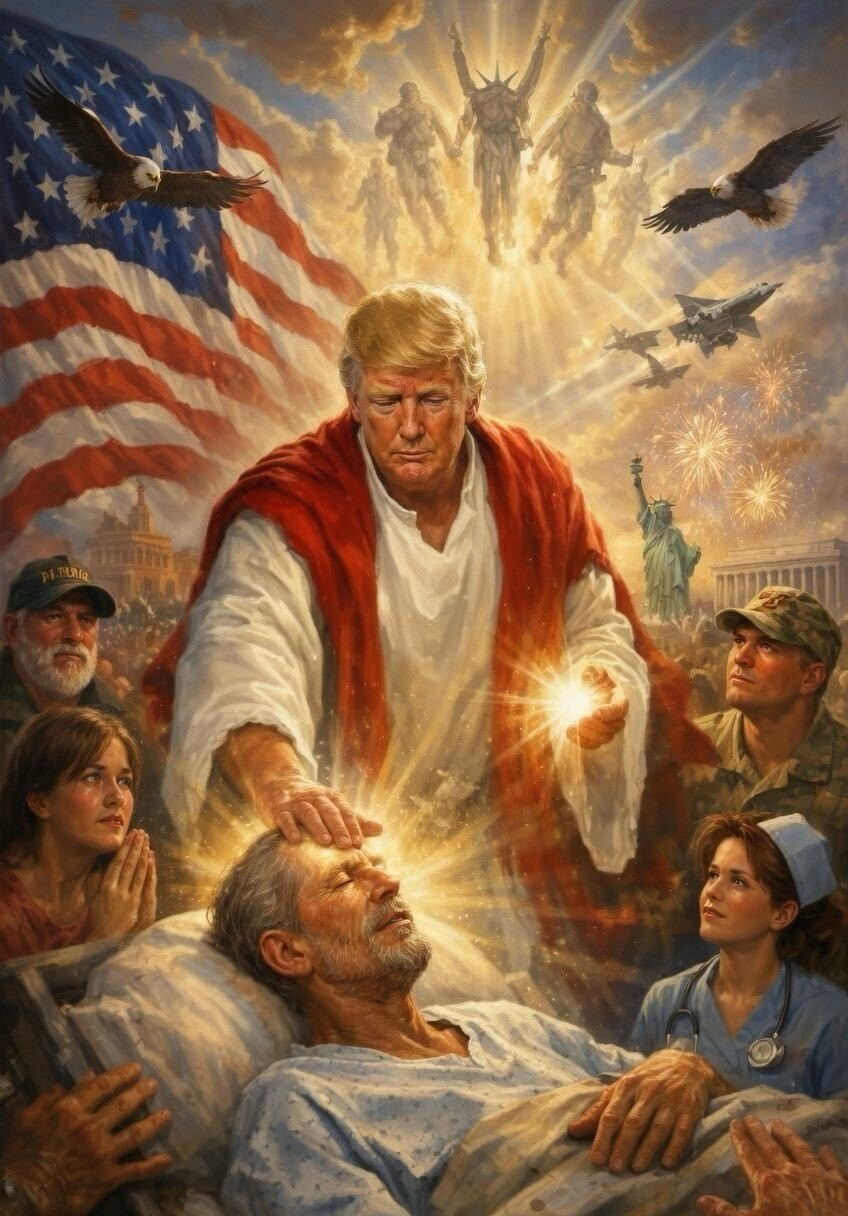
Trump posted this image to his Truth Social account on April 12, 2026. After criticism, the post was quickly deleted.

Some Christian Trump supporters view him as divinely ordained and "chosen by God", and some compare him to Jesus, with opposition to him seen as spiritual warfare. Trump shared and played a video entitled "God Made Trump" at several of his rallies, explicitly comparing him to a messianic figure in religious terms. Trump is frequently described among some of his Christian supporters as an Old Testament (Hebrew Bible) hero, with Cyrus the Great or David frequently mentioned. The New York Times describes his supporters seeing him as one of several "morally flawed figures handpicked by God to lead profound missions aimed at achieving overdue justice or resisting existential evil". This framing has been described as "vessel theology" which allows for support of Trump and excuses his prior sexual misconduct and adultery. Trump has strong support with members of the dominionist New Apostolic Reformation, and many Trump administration officials are aligned with the group.

Christian support for Donald Trump is often regarded as theologically and morally puzzling given his personal background as a thrice‑married, wealth‑oriented, reality‑television business mogul with a publicly flamboyant lifestyle - as well as his sexual assault scandals, impeachments, indictments, and lawsuits. This perceived inconsistency arises from the apparent tension between traditional Christian moral expectations—particularly within conservative evangelical and other historically orthodox Protestant circles—and the political allegiance many adherents have shown toward Trump throughout his public career and presidency.

Outside of his celebrity persona and business endeavors, Donald Trump's personal religiosity faces heavy dispute due to contrasts between his public Christian identity and observed behaviors - Critics highlight superficial knowledge, irregular practices, and a few public blunders. When asked for his favorite Bible verse during a Bloomberg interview on August 26, 2015, Trump refused to cite one replying it was "very personal" and declining specifics - when asked whether he prefers The Old or New Testament he vaguely answered "probably... equal" On July 18, 2015, during the Family Leadership Summit, Frank Luntz asked Trump if he'd ever asked God for forgiveness; Trump responded, "I'm not sure I have. I just go and try to do a better job from there. I don't think so. I think if I do something wrong, I think I just try and make it right. I don't bring God into that picture. I don't."

Donald Trump selected Mike Pence as his 2016 running mate to help bolster support among the Christian right and evangelical voters, who were skeptical of Trump's personal history. Pence, then Indiana's governor, brought impeccable credentials as a devout evangelical, vocal advocate for traditional values like opposition to abortion and same-sex marriage, and a self-described "Christian, conservative, and Republican—in that order."

Christian support for Trump has been the subject of The 'Republican Jesus' meme - which satirizes Republican policies such as Rugged Individualism, Supply-Side Economics, Nativism, and anti-immigrationism as incompatible with the actual teachings of Jesus.

In May 2021, to commemorate the 20th anniversary of the World Trade Center attack in New York, Donald Trump alongside country music singer Lee Greenwood published The 'God Bless the U.S.A. Bible'. It has the U.S. flag on its leather cover and includes texts of the Declaration of Independence, the original Constitution before amendments, The Bill of Rights, the Pledge of Allegiance, and the chorus of Greenwood's song "God Bless the USA" in Greenwood's own handwriting.

The Bible has been a subject of criticism due to idolatry, and mixing religion with political branding and personal profit for a President campaign product. Critics also argue that putting Trump's own name on a Bible, and bundling it with American Civil Religion are idolatric

The Trump Prophecy is a 2018 Christian drama film that tells the Mark Taylor, a retired firefighter from Orlando, Florida living with PTSD who claims to have received a divine message that Donald Trump would become president of the United States in April 2011 after his wife prays for him.

Don Colossus is a 22-foot golden statue of Donald Trump, unveiled at the Trump National Doral Miami. Evangelicals leaders gathered to pray in front of the statue, which critics compared to The Golden Calf from Exodus.

== Polling ==
According to 2016 election exit polls, 26% of voters self-identified as white evangelical Christians, of whom more than three-fourths in 2017 approved of Trump's performance, most of them approving "very strongly" as reported by a Pew Research Center study. In contrast, approximately two-thirds of non-white evangelicals supported Hillary Clinton in 2016, with 90% of Black Protestants also voting for her, even though their theological views are similar to those of evangelicals. According to Yale researcher Philip Gorski, "the question is not so much why evangelicals voted for Trump then—many did not—but why so many white evangelicals did." Gorski's answer was simply "because they are also white Christian nationalists and Trumpism is inter alia a reactionary version of white Christian nationalism."

A Public Religion Research Institute (PRRI) post‑2024 election survey of about 5,700 U.S. adults found that 25% of all voters agreed with the statement “God ordained Donald Trump to be the winner of the 2024 presidential election.” Among white evangelical Protestants, that figure was 60%, and among Hispanic Protestants it was 45%.

A Pew Research Center survey of roughly 6,000–8,900 adults found that about 32% of Americans said Trump's election must be part of God's plan, though only around 4–5% said God chose him because of his policies. Among white evangelicals, that share rose to about 60–63% saying his election was part of God's plan, even if not necessarily his policies.

A December 2019 survey found 21.4% of respondents said Trump was anointed; among white evangelicals it was 29%, and among white Pentecostals as high as 53%

A Premier Christian News poll from October 16, 2025, found a quarter of Americans believe Trump's rise is a part of God's plan

A Christianity Today study found 72% of white evangelical Christians approve of Trump's job performance within the first 100 days back in office, whereas majorities in other large religious groups (white nonevangelical Protestants, white Catholics, etc.) do not reach that level of approval.

However, most Americans largely believe Donald Trump is not personally religious - An April 2026 Pew Research Center survey found 70% of U.S. adults said Trump is "not too" or "not at all" religious, up 8 points from fall 2024.

== Analysis ==
Israeli philosopher Adi Ophir sees the politics of purity in the white Christian nationalist rhetoric of evangelical supporters, such as the comparison of Nehemiah's wall around Jerusalem to Trump's wall keeping out the enemy, writing, "the notion of the enemy includes 'Mexican migrants', 'filthy' gays, and even Catholics 'led astray by Satan', and the real danger these enemies pose is degradation to a 'blessed—great— ... nation' whose God is the Lord."

Theologian Michael Horton believes Christian Trumpism represents the confluence of three trends that have come together, namely Christian American exceptionalism, end-times conspiracies, and the prosperity gospel, with Christian Americanism being the narrative that God specially called the United States into being as an extraordinary if not miraculous providence and end-times conspiracy referring to the world's annihilation (figurative or literal) due to some conspiracy of nefarious groups and globalist powers threatening American sovereignty. Horton thinks that what he calls the "cult of Christian Trumpism" blends these three ingredients with "a generous dose of hucksterism" as well as self-promotion and personality cult.

Evangelical Christian and historian John Fea believes "the church has warned against the pursuit of political power for a long, long time", but that many modern-day evangelicals, such as Trump advisor and televangelist Paula White, ignore these admonitions. Televangelist Jim Bakker praises prosperity gospel preacher White's ability to "walk into the White House at any time she wants to" and have "full access to the King." According to Fea, there are several other "court evangelicals" who have "devoted their careers to endorsing political candidates and Supreme Court justices who will restore what they believe to be the Judeo-Christian roots of the country" and who in turn are called on by Trump to "explain to their followers why Trump can be trusted in spite of his moral failings", including James Dobson, Franklin Graham, Johnnie Moore Jr., Ralph Reed, Gary Bauer, Richard Land, megachurch pastor Mark Burns and Southern Baptist pastor and Fox political commentator Robert Jeffress.

For prominent Christians who fail to support Trump, the cost is a loss of presidential access and a substantial risk of criticism, a lesson learned by Timothy Dalrymple, president of the flagship magazine of evangelicals Christianity Today, and former chief editor Mark Galli, who were condemned by more than two hundred evangelical leaders for co-authoring a letter arguing that Christians were obligated to support the impeachment of Trump.

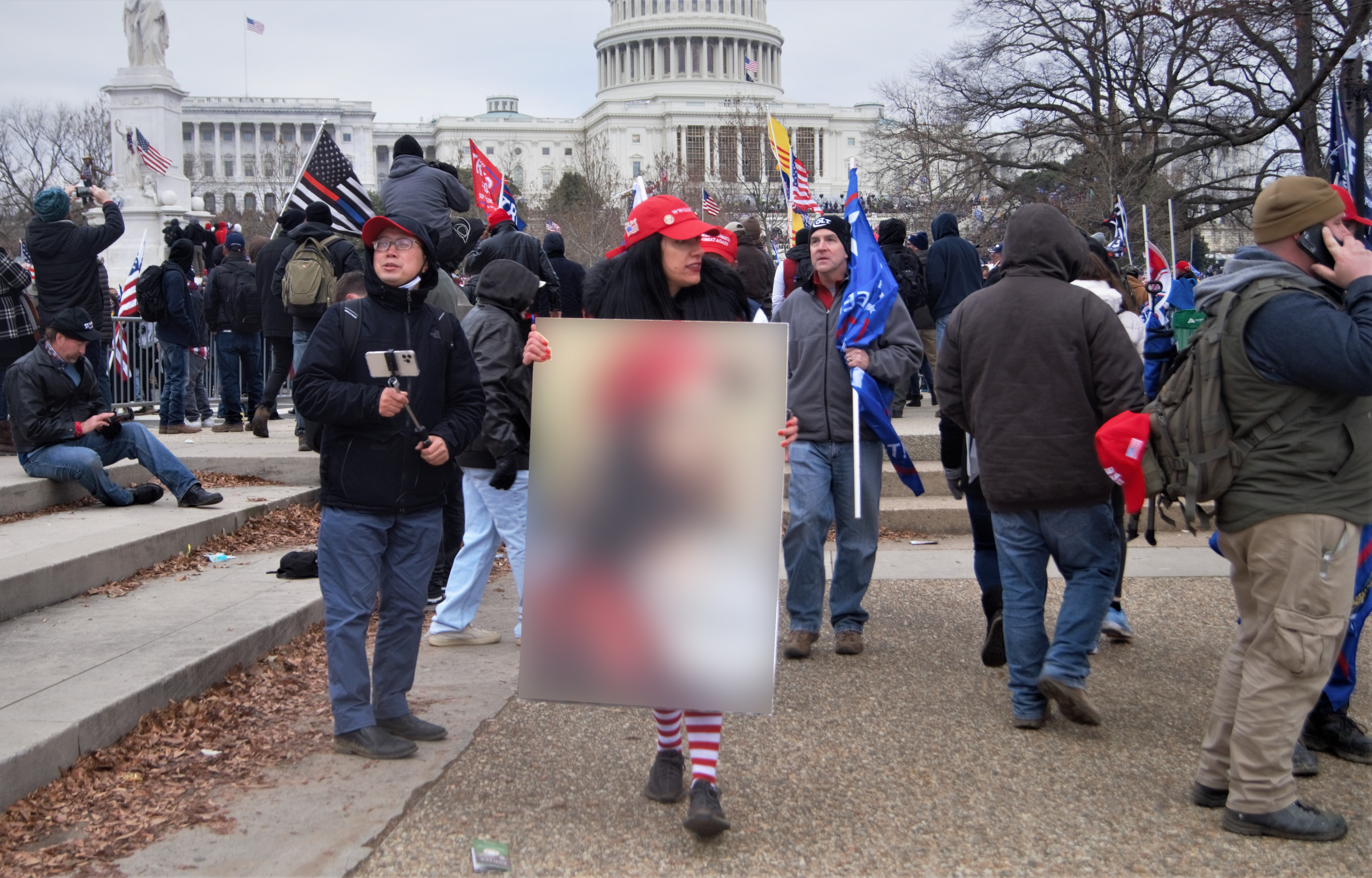
A Trump supporter carries a QAnon tagged placard with Jesus wearing a MAGA hat at the moment the U.S. Congress was violently attacked by rioters on January 6, 2021. (Note: The placard has the hashtag "#WWG1WGA" which stands for QAnon motto "where we go one, we go all". The image of Jesus was blurred due to copyright restrictions.)

External image
- Same image as above, without the blurring

Historian Stephen Jaeger traces the history of admonitions against becoming beholden religious courtiers back to the 11th century, with warnings of curses placed on holy men barred from heaven for taking too "keen an interest in the affairs of the state." Dangers to the court clergy were described by Peter of Blois, a 12th-century French cleric, theologian and courtier who "knew that court life is the death of the soul" and that despite believing that participation at court was "contrary to God and salvation," the clerical courtiers justified it with comparisons to Moses being sent by God to the Pharaoh. Pope Pius II opposed the clergy's presence at court, believing it was difficult for a Christian courtier to "rein in ambition, suppress avarice, tame envy, strife, wrath, and cut off vice, while standing in the midst of these [very] things." The history of warnings of the corrupting influence of power on holy leaders is recounted by Fea who compares it to behavior of Trump's court evangelical leaders, warning that Christians risk "making idols out of political leaders."

Jeffress claims that evangelical leaders' support of Trump is moral regardless of behavior that Christianity Today's chief editor called "a near perfect example of a human being who is morally lost and confused." Jeffress argues that "the godly principle here is that governments have one responsibility, and that is Romans 13 [which] says to avenge evil doers." This same biblical chapter was used by Jeff Sessions to claim biblical justification for Trump's policy of separating children from immigrant families. Historian Lincoln Muller explains that this is one of two interpretations of Romans 13, which has been used in American political debates since its founding, and is on the side of "the thread of American history that justifies oppression and domination in the name of law and order."

From Jeffress's reading, the government's purpose is as a "strongman to protect its citizens against evildoers", adding: "I don't care about that candidate's tone or vocabulary, I want the meanest toughest son of a you-know-what I can find, and I believe that is biblical." Jeffress, who referred to Barack Obama as "paving the way for the future reign of the Antichrist," Mitt Romney—a Mormon—as a cult follower of a non-Christian religion, and Roman Catholicism as a "Satanic" result of "Babylonian mystery religion" traces the Christian libertarian perspective on government's sole role to suppress evil back to Augustine of Hippo, who argued in The City of God against the Pagans (426 CE) that government's role is to restrain evil so Christians can peacefully practice their beliefs. Martin Luther similarly believed that government should be limited to checking sin.

Like Jeffress, Richard Land refused to cut ties with Trump after his reaction to the Charlottesville white supremacist rally, with the explanation that "Jesus did not turn away from those who may have seemed brash with their words or behavior," adding that "now is not the time to quit or retreat, but just the opposite—to lean in closer." Johnnie Moore's explanation for refusing to repudiate Trump after his Charlottesville response was that "you only make a difference if you have a seat at the table." Trinity Forum fellow Peter Wehner warns that "[t]he perennial danger facing Christians is seduction and self-delusion. That's what's happening in the Trump era. The president is using evangelical leaders to shield himself from criticism." Evangelical biblical scholar Ben Witherington believes Trump's evangelical apologists' defensive use of the tax collector comparison is false and that retaining a "seat at the table" is supportable only if the Christian leader is admonishing the president to reverse course, explaining that "[t]he sinners and tax collectors were not political officials, so there is no analogy there. Besides, Jesus was not giving the sinners and tax collectors political advice—he was telling them to repent! If that's what evangelical leaders are doing with our President, and telling him when his politics are un-Christian, and explaining to him that racism is an enormous sin and there is no moral equivalency between the two sides in Charlottesville, then well and good. Otherwise, they are complicit with the sins of our leaders."

Evangelical Bible studies author Beth Moore joins in criticism of the perspective of Trump's evangelicals, writing: "I have never seen anything in these United States of America [that] I found more astonishingly seductive and dangerous to the saints of God than Trumpism. This Christian nationalism is not of God. Move back from it." Moore warns that "we will be held responsible for remaining passive in this day of seduction to save our own skin while the saints we've been entrusted to serve are being seduced, manipulated, USED and stirred up into a lather of zeal devoid of the Holy Spirit for political gain." Moore's view is that "[w]e can't sanctify idolatry by labeling a leader our Cyrus. We need no Cyrus. We have a king. His name is Jesus." Other prominent white evangelicals have taken Christian Bible-based stands against Trump, such as Peter Wehner of the conservative Ethics and Public Policy Center and Russell D. Moore, president of the public policy arm of the Southern Baptist Convention. Wehner describes Trump's theology as embodying "a Nietzschean morality rather than a Christian one," that evangelicals' "support for Trump comes at a high cost for Christian witness," and that "Trump's most enduring legacy [may be] a nihilistic political culture, one that is tribalistic, distrustful, and sometimes delusional, swimming in conspiracy theories." Moore sharply distanced himself from Trump's racial rhetoric, stating, "The Bible speaks so directly to these issues," and, "that, really, in order to avoid questions of racial unity, one has to evade the Bible itself."

Presbyterian minister and Pulitzer prize winning author Chris Hedges thinks many of Trump's white evangelical supporters resemble those of the German Christians movement of 1930s Germany who also regarded their leader in an idolatrous way, the Christofascist idea of a Volk messiah: a leader who would act as an instrument of God to restore their country from moral depravity to greatness. (Note: For an elaboration of the fascist idea and political force of leader viewed as an anointed one, or a messiah, see: Waite, Robert G. L (1993) [1977]. The Psychopathic God. New York: Da Capo Press. pp. 31–32, 343. ISBN 0-306-80514-6.) Also rejecting the idolatry, John Fea said "Trump takes everything that Jesus taught, especially in the Sermon on the Mount, throws it out the window, exchanges it for a mess of pottage called 'Make America Great Again', and from a Christian perspective for me, that borders on—no, it is a form of idolatry."

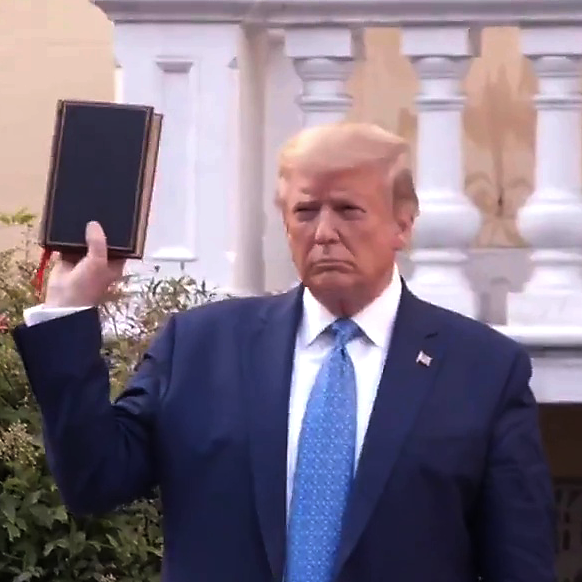
Trump uses a Bible at a photo op at St. John's church during the George Floyd protests. (Note: Multiple prominent members of the faith community including the Bishop of the diocese objected to Trump's use of the Bible as a prop. Evangelical supporters variously saw the event as proclaiming victory in a world of evil, that Trump was figuratively putting on the Armor of God, or was beginning a "Jericho walk".)

Christian theologian Greg Boyd challenges the religious right's politicization of Christianity and the Christian nationalist theory of American exceptionalism, charging that "a significant segment of American evangelicalism is guilty of nationalistic and political idolatry." Boyd compares the cause of "taking America back for God" and policies to force Christian values through political coercion to the aspiration of early Christians in the first-century Land of Israel to "take Israel back for God," which led followers to try to fit Jesus into the role of a political messiah. Boyd argues that Jesus declined, demonstrating that "God's mode of operation in the world was no longer going to be nationalistic." Boyd urges consideration of Jesus's example, asking whether Jesus ever suggested, by word or example, that Christians should aspire to gain power in the reigning government of the day, or whether he advocated using civil laws to change the behavior of sinners.

Like Fea, Boyd states he is not making the case for passive political noninvolvement, writing that "of course our political views will be influenced by our Christian faith," but rather that Christians must embrace humility and not "christen our views as 'the' Christian view." In Boyd's view, this humility requires Christians to reject social domination, the "'power over' others to acquire and secure these things," and to recognize that "the only way we individually and collectively represent the kingdom of God is through loving, Christ like [sic?], sacrificial acts of service to others. Anything and everything else, however good and noble, lies outside the kingdom of God." Horton thinks that rather than engage in what he calls the cult of "Christian Trumpism", Christians should reject turning the "saving gospel into a worldly power". Fea thinks the Christian response to Trump should instead be those used toward a civil rights movement—namely preaching hope not fear; humility, not power to socially dominate others; and responsible reading of history as in Martin Luther King Jr.'s Letter from Birmingham Jail rather than nostalgia for a prior American Christian utopia that never was.

As part of the January 6 rally, a coalition of Christian groups organized what they called the "Jericho March", a name the group now uses. Conservative Orthodox Christian writer Rod Dreher and theologian Michael Horton have argued that participants in the original march were engaging in "Trump worship", akin to idolatry. In the National Review, Cameron Hilditch described the movement as "[a] toxic ideological cocktail of grievance, paranoia, and self-exculpatory rage was on display at the 'Jericho March,' ... Their aim was to 'stop the steal' of the presidential election, to prepare patriots for battle against a 'One-World Government', and to sell pillows at a 25 percent discount. ... In fact, there was a strange impression given throughout the event that attendees believe Christianity is, in some sense, consubstantial with American nationalism. It was as if a new and improved Holy Trinity of 'Father, Son, and Uncle Sam' had taken the place of the old and outmoded Nicene version. When Eric Metaxas, the partisan radio host and emcee for the event, first stepped on stage, he wasn't greeted with psalm-singing or with hymns of praise to the Holy Redeemer, but with chants of 'USA! USA!' In short, the Jericho rally was a worrying example of how Christianity can be twisted and drafted into the service of a political ideology." Emma Green, in The Atlantic, blamed pro-Trump, evangelical white Christians and the Jericho March participants for the storming of the Capitol building on January 6, 2021, saying: "The mob carried signs and flag declaring 'Jesus Saves!' and 'God, Guns & Guts Made America, Let's Keep All Three'."

In April 2026, at an Easter lunch event, Trump's spiritual adviser Paula White-Cain caused controversy when comparing Trump to Jesus, saying: “Mr President, no one has paid the price like you have paid the price. It almost cost you your life. You were betrayed and arrested and falsely accused. It’s a familiar pattern that our lord and savior showed us”.

== See also ==
- Catholicism in the Trump administrations
- Trumpism
- Christian right
- Bible Belt
- Christian nationalism in the United States
- Separation of church and state in the United States

== Bibliography ==
=== Books ===
- Blair, Gwenda (2000). The Trumps: Three Generations of Builders and a Presidential Candidate. New York: Simon & Schuster. ISBN 0-684-80849-8.
- Boyd, Gregory (2005). The Myth of a Christian Nation: How the Quest for Political Power Is Destroying the Church. Grand Rapids, MI: Zondervan. ISBN 0-3102-8124-5.
- Fea, John (2018). Believe Me: The Evangelical Road to Donald Trump. Grand Rapids, MI: Eerdmans. ISBN 978-1-4674-5046-1.
- Jaeger, C. Stephen (1985). The Origins of Courtliness: Civilizing Trends and the Formation of Courtly Ideals. Philadelphia, PA: University of Pennsylvania Press. ASIN B008UYP8H8.
- Jeffress, Robert (2011). Twilight's Last Gleaming: How America's Last Days Can Be Your Best Days. Brentwood, TN: Worthy Publishing. ISBN 978-1936034581.
- Ophir, Adi (2020). "The Political". In Stoler, Ann Laura; Gourgouris, Stathis; Lezra, Jacques (eds.). Thinking With Balibar A Lexicon of Conceptual Practice. Idiom: Inventing Writing Theory. New York, NY: Fordham University Press. pp. 158–182. doi:10.1515/9780823288502-012. ISBN 9780823288489. S2CID 150814728.

=== Articles ===
- Bender, Michael C. (April 1, 2024). "The Church of Trump: How He's Infusing Christianity Into His Movement". The New York Times. ISSN 0362-4331.
- Bensinger, Ken (January 11, 2024). "Iowa Pastors Say Video Depicting Trump as Godly Is 'Very Concerning'". The New York Times. ISSN 0362-4331.
- Burton, Tara Isabella (March 5, 2018). "The biblical story the Christian right uses to defend Trump". Vox.
- Carless, Will (March 7, 2024). "As Trump support merges with Christian nationalism, experts warn of extremist risks". USA Today.
- "What is the QAnon conspiracy theory?". CBS News. September 29, 2020. Archived from the original on October 2, 2020.
- Cox, Ana Marie (October 12, 2016). "Russell Moore Can't Support Either Candidate". The New York Times. New York, NY. Archived from the original on April 18, 2021.
- Dreher, Rod (December 17, 2020). "Church Of Trumpianity". The American Conservative. Washington, D.C. Archived from the original on March 4, 2021.
- "Many Trump supporters believe God has chosen him to rule". The Economist. December 20, 2023.
- Galli, Mark (December 19, 2019). "Trump Should Be Removed from Office". Christianity Today. Archived from the original on December 23, 2019.
- Gorski, Philip (November 13, 2018). "Why Evangelicals Voted for Trump: A Critical Cultural Sociology". In Mast, Jason L.; Alexander, Jeffrey C. (eds.). Politics of Meaning/Meaning of Politics- Cultural Sociology of the 2016 U.S. Presidential Election. Cultural Sociology. Cham: Springer International Publishing. pp. 165–183. doi:10.1007/978-3-319-95945-0_10. ISBN 978-3-319-95945-0. S2CID 239775845. Archived from the original on February 14, 2022 – via Springer Link.
- Green, Emma (January 8, 2021). "A Christian Insurrection". The Atlantic. Archived from the original on January 25, 2021.
- Gryboski, Michael (November 8, 2012). "Texas Megachurch Pastor Says Obama Will 'Pave Way' for Antichrist". The Christian Post. Archived from the original on February 14, 2022.
- Hedges, Chris (January 3, 2020). "Onward, Christian fascists". salon. Archived from the original on December 28, 2020.
- Henderson, Bruce (August 24, 2017). "Evangelical Leader Stays on Trump Advisory Council Despite Charlottesville Response". Charlotte Observer. Archived from the original on February 15, 2021.
- Hilditch, Cameron (December 18, 2020). "Christianity as Ideology: The Cautionary Tale of the Jericho March". National Review. Archived from the original on December 20, 2020.
- Horton, Michael (December 16, 2020). "The Cult of Christian Trumpism". The Gospel Coalition. Archived from the original on February 15, 2021.
- Husser, Jason (April 6, 2020). "Why Trump is reliant on white evangelicals". The Brookings Institution. Archived from the original on March 2, 2021.
- Jeffress, Robert; Fea, John (May 26, 2016). "The Evangelical Debate Over Trump" (audio). Interfaith Voices. Archived from the original on December 24, 2021.
- Jeffress, Robert; Wehner, Peter (July 12, 2016). "Dr. Robert Jeffress and Peter Wehner Join Mike for Important Debate over Evangelical Christian Support of Trump" (audio). The Mike Gallagher Show. Archived from the original on February 15, 2021.
- Klepper, David (April 5, 2023). "Trump arrest prompts Jesus comparisons: 'Spiritual warfare'". USA Today.
- Lewis, Matt (December 12, 2020). "Bad News for Evangelicals—God Doesn't Need Donald Trump in the White House". The Daily Beast. Archived from the original on March 9, 2021 – via www.msn.com.
- Moore, Johnnie (August 24, 2017). "Evangelical Trump Adviser: Why I Won't Bail on the White House". Religion News Service. Archived from the original on February 15, 2021.
- Mullen, Lincoln (June 16, 2018). "The Fight to Define Romans 13". The Atlantic. Archived from the original on February 15, 2021.
- Perry, Samuel L.; Whitehead, Andrew L.; Grubbs, Joshua B. (April 21, 2021). "The Devil That You Know: Christian Nationalism and Intent to Change One's Voting Behavior For or Against Trump in 2020". Politics and Religion. 15 (2): 229–246. doi:10.1017/S175504832100002X. hdl:11244/334967.
- Petrovic, Phoebe (October 26, 2024). "The Genesis of Christian Nationalism". ProPublica.
- Smith, Gregory A. (April 26, 2017). "Among white evangelicals, regular churchgoers are the most supportive of Trump". Pew Research Center. Archived from the original on March 12, 2021.
- Shabad, Rebecca; Bennett, Geoff; Alba, Monica; Pettypiece, Shannon (June 2, 2020). "'The Bible is not a prop': Religious leaders, lawmakers outraged over Trump church visit". NBC News. Archived from the original on February 15, 2021.
- Shellnutt, Kate (September 6, 2017). "Should Christians Keep Advising a President They Disagree With?". Christianity Today. Archived from the original on February 15, 2021.
- Smith, Peter (May 18, 2024). "Jesus is their savior, Trump is their candidate. Ex-president's backers say he shares faith, values". AP News.
- Tashman, Brian (October 8, 2011). "Jeffress Says Satan Is Behind Roman Catholicism". Right Wing Watch. Archived from the original on September 19, 2016.
- Teague, Matthew (June 3, 2020). "'He wears the armor of God': evangelicals hail Trump's church photo op". The Guardian. Archived from the original on February 15, 2021.
- Vakil, Caroline (June 24, 2023). "Trump paints 2024 campaign as 'righteous crusade' as he rallies evangelicals". The Hill. Archived from the original on January 20, 2025.
- Wehner, Peter (January 21, 2017). "Why I Cannot Fall in Line Behind Trump". The New York Times. Archived from the original on February 13, 2021.
- Wehner, Peter (July 5, 2019). "The Deepening Crisis in Evangelical Christianity". The Atlantic. Archived from the original on April 23, 2021.
- Wehner, Peter (December 7, 2020). "Trump's Most Malicious Legacy". The Atlantic. Archived from the original on May 14, 2021.
