= Catholicism in the Trump administrations =

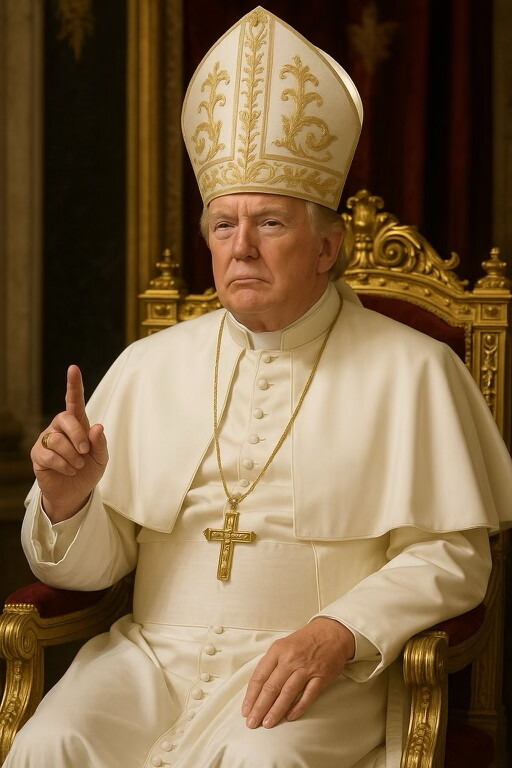
In May 2025, Trump posted an AI-generated image of himself as the pope.

Tensions have mounted between the Catholic Church and officials associated with U.S. president Donald Trump, including Trump himself, since Trump announced a campaign in the 2016 United States presidential election. Both of Trump's vice presidents, Mike Pence and JD Vance, have been associated with the Catholic Church, though Pence is a former Catholic who converted to Evangelicalism while Vance is a Catholic convert from Protestantism.

== History ==
=== Conflict between Trump and Pope Francis ===
The Catholic Church and politics in the United States have a long relationship. Since establishing his policy positions in his initial announcement running for the 2016 United States presidential election, Donald Trump's rhetoric—including promises to institute mass deportations and institute a border wall—has served in stark contrast to Pope Francis's theology. Prior to his visit to the United States, which included an address before a joint session of the United States Congress, Francis's views on immigration were noted to serve as an ideological counterweight to Trump; Politico described Francis as the "anti-Donald Trump". That month, Trump boasted about receiving more attention than Francis at a Faith and Freedom Coalition dinner in Iowa. In August, Trump expressed his intention to "scare" Francis by warning him of the Islamic State over Francis's criticism of capitalism. He later told the journalist Jake Tapper that he did not believe that Francis would disapprove of him despite his wealth.

After Francis's speech, Trump publicly disagreed with Francis on climate change. In February 2016, Trump criticized Francis as a "very political person" for visiting areas close to the Mexico–United States border while holding a theology sympathetic to immigrants. In a response viewed as a rebuke of Trump's views on immigration, Francis framed the crisis at the border as humanitarian. Francis stated that Trump, a Presbyterian, was not a Christian because of his desire to construct a border wall; Trump responded that Francis's comment was "disgraceful" and suggested that it was inevitable that the Islamic State would attack Vatican City.

=== 2024 presidential election and second Trump administration ===
In November 2024, Donald Trump defeated Kamala Harris in that year's U.S. presidential election. President Joe Biden, a member of the Latin Church, met with Pope Francis in January 2025; although the visit was described as a discussion on world peace, Biden intended to seek "relief" as his term ended, according to The New York Times.

On January 25, 2025, in an episode of the CBS News programme Face the Nation, Vice President JD Vance criticised the United States Conference of Catholic Bishops condemnation of the Trump administration's decision to allow raids by Immigration and Customs Enforcement agents in schools and churches. During the interview, Vance said "Because as a practicing Catholic, I was actually heartbroken by that statement. And I think that the U.S. Conference of Catholic Bishops needs to actually look in the mirror a little bit and recognize that when they receive over $100 million to help resettle illegal immigrants, are they worried about humanitarian concerns? Or are they actually worried about their bottom line? We're going to enforce immigration law. We're going to protect the American people."

In April 2026, Trump criticized Pope Leo XIV as someone who "likes crime"; who supports the proliferation of nuclear weapons; and who is a "very liberal person". In a post on Truth Social, he stated that Leo would not be the pope if not for his victory. The comments intensified Leo's dispute with Trump into a direct confrontation. Leo told reporters that he had "no fear" of the Trump administration. Trump later posted an ostensibly AI-generated image depicting himself as a Jesus-like figure. His attacks on Leo and the image garnered widespread criticism; Trump later deleted the image.

== Responses ==
=== Catholic response ===
Using Pope Francis's speech before the United States Congress, the advocacy organizations SumOfUs and the Franciscan Action Network released a parody of The Apprentice (2004–2017) positioning Francis against candidates in the 2016 Republican Party presidential primaries.

=== Protestant response ===
After Francis's arrival in Washington, D.C., Samuel Rodriguez, the president of the National Hispanic Christian Leadership Conference, described his presence as "quintessential heavenly pushback" to Trump.

=== International response ===
Italian prime minister Giorgia Meloni criticized Trump's comments on Leo as "unacceptable".

== See also ==
- Donald Trump and religion
- Christian support of Donald Trump
- Christian nationalism in the United States
- Holy See–United States relations
