= Emma Green (journalist) =

American journalist and writer

- Education: Georgetown University, Washington, D.C.
- Occupations: Staff writer, The New Yorker; formerly managing editor The Atlantic

Emma Green is an American journalist and writer for The New Yorker. In November 2021, she was named a staff writer for the magazine, covering topics of academia and cultural conflicts in education. Green formerly worked as a staff writer and managing editor for The Atlantic, where she covered religion and politics. She has won several awards for her writing, including Religion News Association's first-place award in religion-news analysis in 2018, and the 2020 George W. Hunt, S.J., Prize for Journalism. Green graduated from Georgetown University in 2012.

== Bibliography ==
- Green, Emma (June 5, 2023). "Is it possible to be both moderate and anti-woke? A small nonprofit launched by the journalist Bari Weiss devolves into tribalism". Annals of Activism. The New Yorker. Archived from the original on 2023-06-05. (Note: Available on website only.)

———————

Bibliography notes
