= Political positions of Mike Pence =

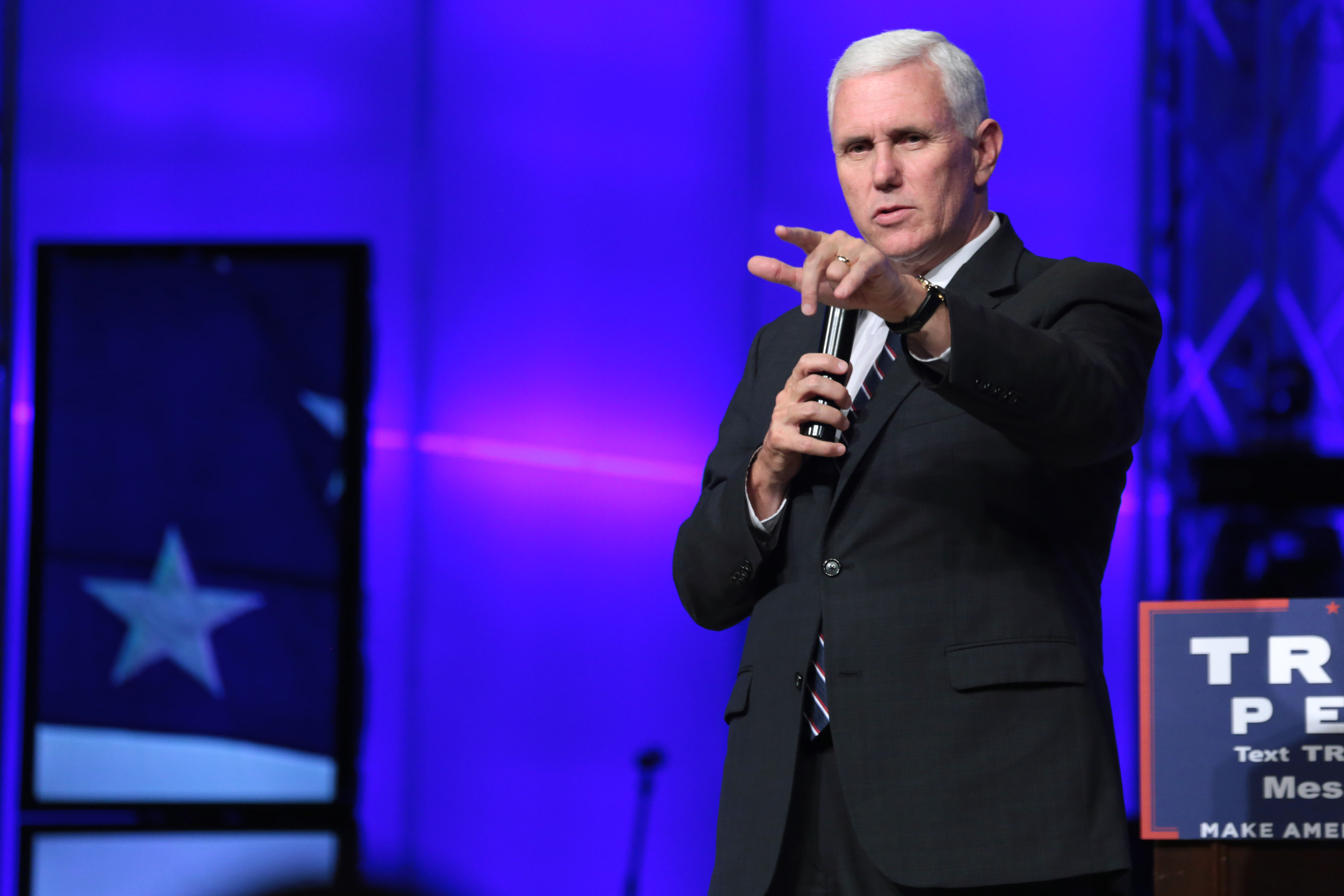
Pence speaking with supporters at a church service in Mesa, Arizona

Mike Pence served as the 48th vice president of the United States from 2017 to 2021 under President Donald Trump. A member of the Republican Party, he was previously the 50th governor of Indiana from 2013 to 2017, and a member of the House of Representatives from Indiana from 2001 to 2013.

Pence has consistently articulated views aligned with the Christian right, and in his 2016 acceptance speech for his nomination as the Republican Party's candidate for vice president, Pence stated that he is a "Christian, a conservative, and Republican, in that order".

== Abortion, sex education, and stem cell research ==
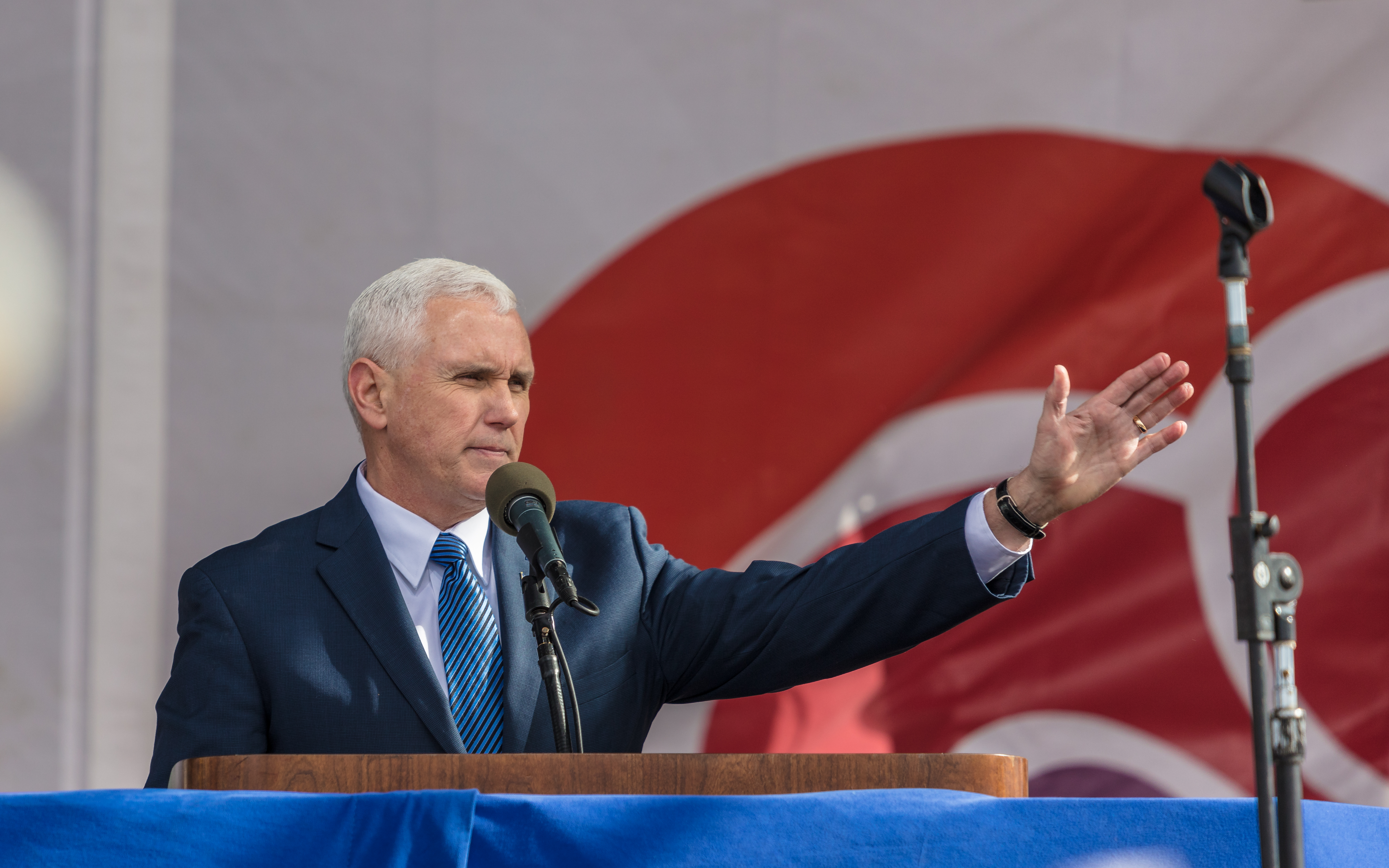
Pence speaking at the March for Life in Washington, D.C., 2017

Pence is an opponent of abortion, and his unwavering support of abortion restrictions has gained him the support of grassroots conservative activists. He began seeking to defund Planned Parenthood in 2007 and in three congressional sessions, he introduced legislation to block organizations that provide abortion services from receiving any Title X funding, even for services not related to reproductive health or family planning. Susan B. Anthony List president Marjorie Dannenfelser has praised Pence as a "pro-life trailblazer".

Pence has criticized comprehensive sex education. In 2002, he criticized a speech by then-secretary of state Colin Powell, who had said it was "important for young people ... to protect themselves from the possibility of acquiring any sexually transmitted disease" through the use of condoms. Pence called Powell's comments a "sad day" and expressed his support for abstinence education. He asserted that "condoms are a very, very poor protection against sexually transmitted diseases" and that Powell was "maybe inadvertently misleading millions of young people and endangering lives" despite the Centers for Disease Control and Prevention (CDC) assessment that when properly used they offer effective protection against sexually transmitted diseases.

Pence opposed president Barack Obama's executive order eliminating restrictions on embryonic stem-cell research, saying: "I believe it is morally wrong to create human life to destroy it for research ... I believe it is morally wrong to take the tax dollars of millions of pro-life Americans." He asserted that "scientific breakthroughs have rendered embryonic stem-cell research obsolete."

On January 27, 2017, Pence spoke at the March for Life in Washington, D.C., becoming the first vice president of the United States, and at the time, the highest-ranking U.S. official to ever speak at the annual event, until president Donald Trump spoke at the event in 2020.

Pence said in 2018 he supported an overturn of Roe v. Wade, but denied U.S. Supreme Court justice Brett Kavanaugh was nominated for that purpose. During the 2020 vice presidential debate, when moderator Susan Page asked what he would want states to do if Roe were overturned, Pence refused to endorse criminalizing abortion, instead simply referring to himself as "pro-life".

The day the Supreme Court overturned Roe in June 2022, Pence told Breitbart News: "Roe v. Wade has been consigned to the ash heap of history...Having been given this second chance for life, we must not rest and must not relent until the sanctity of life is restored to the center of American law in every state in the land."

== Social views ==
=== Race ===
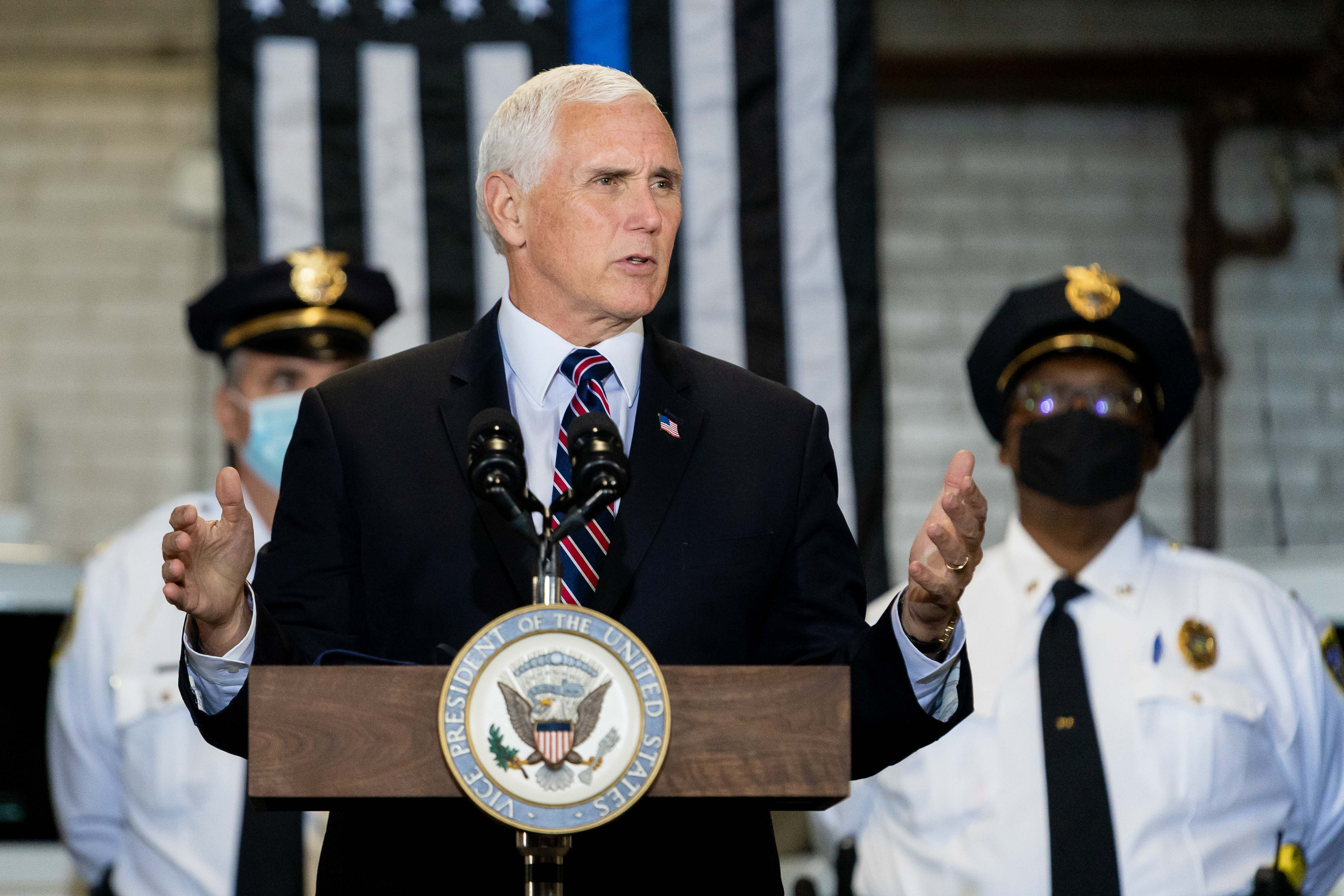
Pence speaking to police officers in Youngstown, Ohio, June 25, 2020

During Juneteenth Day of 2020, a television journalist asked Pence if he would say the words Black Lives Matter. Pence replied that all lives matter. He added that no significant U.S. group would disagree, as he saw it, about "the preciousness and importance of every human life". Pence denounced the police abolition movement when speaking to a police union rally in Philadelphia in July 2020, commenting how "we also don't need to choose between supporting our police and supporting African American families here in Philadelphia or anywhere in America. We can do both. We have done both."

=== LGBT rights ===
Pence has been a staunch opponent of efforts to expand LGBT civil rights, during both his governorship and his tenure as a member of the U.S. House of Representatives. In 2000, his congressional campaign website said, "Congress should oppose any effort to recognize homosexuals as a "discrete and insular minority" entitled to the protection of anti-discrimination laws similar to those extended to women and ethnic minorities." Also included on his website was a call for "an audit to ensure that federal dollars were no longer being given to organizations that celebrate and encourage the types of behaviors that facilitate the spreading of the HIV virus" and instead advocated that "Resources should be directed toward those institutions which provide assistance to those seeking to change their sexual behavior." Some LGBT rights advocates have cited this as evidence of Pence endorsing conversion therapy, a charge he denies.

In 2007, Pence voted against the Employment Non-Discrimination Act, which would have banned workplace discrimination on the basis of sexual orientation. Pence opposed the 2009 Matthew Shepard Hate Crimes Act, saying that Obama wanted to "advance a radical social agenda" and said that pastors "could be charged or be subject to intimidation for simply expressing a Biblical worldview on the issue of homosexual behavior." In 2009, Pence claimed that there was "no evidence of any hate crimes occurring against individuals for gender identity."

Pence has said that homosexuals should not serve in the military, saying, "Homosexuality is incompatible with military service because the presence of homosexuals in the ranks weakens unit cohesion." Pence opposed the repeal of "don't ask, don't tell", saying in 2010 that allowing gays and lesbians to openly serve in the military would "have an impact on unit cohesion".

Pence opposes both same-sex marriage and civil unions. While in the House, he said that "societal collapse was always brought about following an advent of the deterioration of marriage and family." He has advocated a constitutional same-sex marriage ban but did not champion such a proposed ban for his first year as governor.

In March 2019, former vice president Joe Biden referred to Pence as "a decent guy" during a speech at the University of Nebraska Omaha, a month before Biden announced his 2020 presidential campaign. LGBT groups, progressive leaders and celebrities strongly criticized him, with Cynthia Nixon, an actress and candidate in the 2018 New York gubernatorial election, chastising Biden on Twitter, to which Biden responded by apologizing and criticizing Pence's stance on LGBT rights. Nixon later penned an op-ed in The Washington Post calling Pence "insidious and dangerous" for his actions on LGBT rights, claiming about Biden's comments that "it's easy to say nice things about Pence when you're not personally threatened by his agenda. If Biden were being directly attacked in the same way that our community is, I think he would see Pence from a very different vantage point."

== Economic policy ==
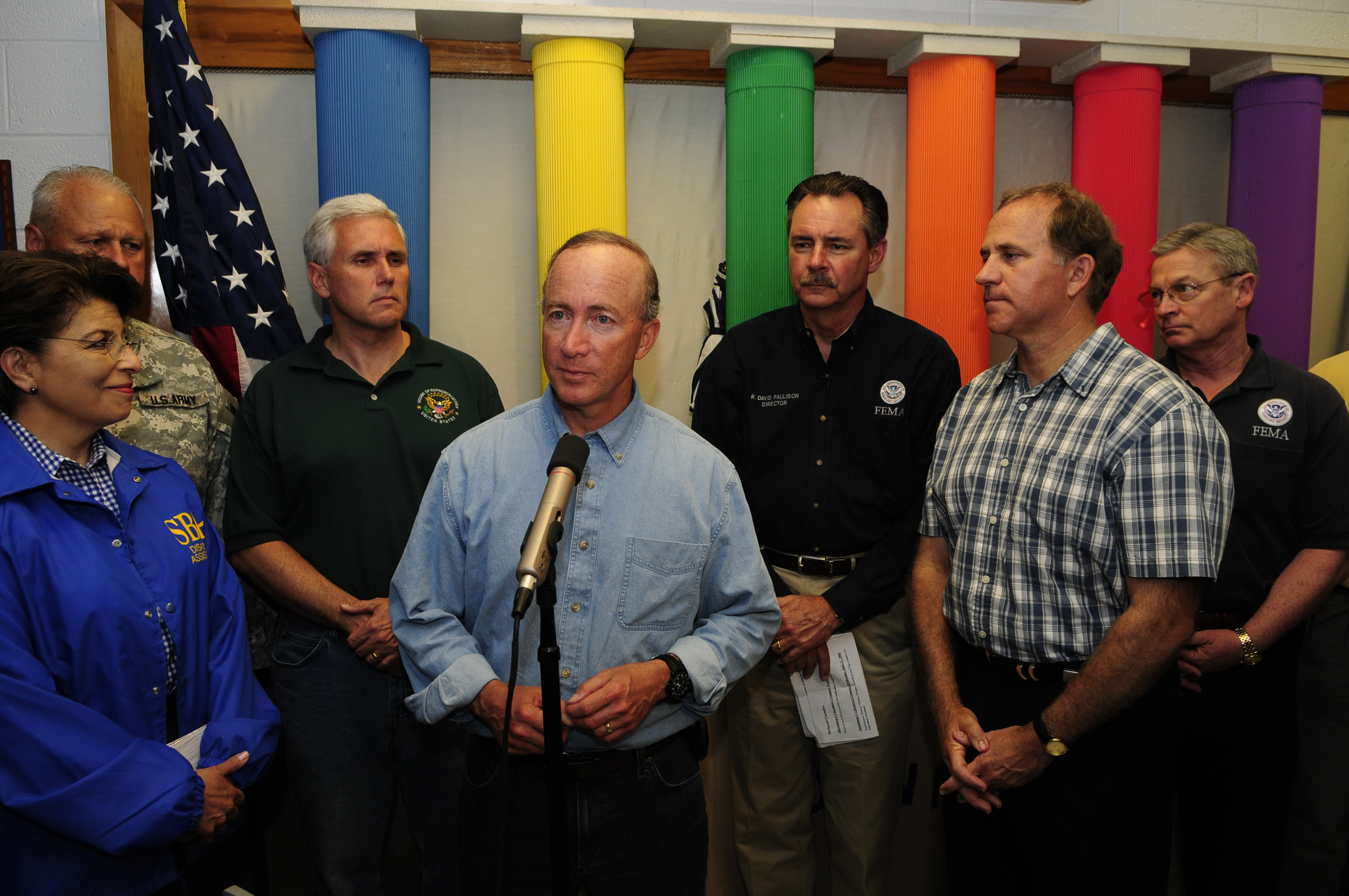
U.S. representative Pence (third from left) behind Indiana governor Mitch Daniels at a press conference, 2008

Pence was a co-sponsor of a 2011 spending limit amendment to the U.S. Constitution, which was introduced by Michigan U.S. representative Justin Amash. The amendment proposed limiting federal spending to "the average annual revenue collected in the three prior years, adjusted in proportion to changes in population and inflation". In regards to adopting the gold standard, Pence said in 2011, "the time has come to have a debate over gold and the proper role it should play in our nation's monetary affairs."

Pence proposed legislation to end the dual mandate of the Federal Reserve (maximizing employment and stabilizing prices), requiring the Fed to just focus on price stability and not full employment. He has been a proponent of a flat federal tax rate. Pence opposed the 2008 Troubled Asset Relief Program of 2008. Pence also opposed the automotive industry rescue package of 2008–2009, which guided General Motors and Chrysler through bankruptcy.

In 2007, Pence voted against raising the federal minimum wage from $5.15 to $7.25 an hour over two years, saying it would "hurt the working poor". While in the House, Pence voted against the Employee Free Choice Act ("card check"). He voted against the American Recovery and Reinvestment Act of 2009. He had publicly opposed the bill, denouncing it as a failure, and called for a federal spending freeze. Nevertheless, several months after voting against the bill, Pence privately sought $6 million in stimulus funds for projects in his district, and in 2010, hosted a job fair for stimulus-backed employers. A Pence spokesperson said that "once it became law, he had a responsibility to support local efforts to secure funding for projects that could benefit people in his district." Pence voted against the Dodd–Frank Wall Street Reform and Consumer Protection Act.

Pence was a supporter of earmark reform. He voted against the $139.7 billion Transportation–Treasury spending bill in June 2006, and in favor of a series of amendments proposed that same month by Jeff Flake which would strip other members' earmarks from the federal budget. On occasion, however, Pence secured earmarks for projects in his district.

=== Social Security ===
Pence supported president George W. Bush's unsuccessful 2005 proposal to partially privatize Social Security by allowing workers to invest part of their Social Security payroll taxes in private investment accounts and reduce the increase in benefits for high-income participants. Pence had previously proposed a similar but more aggressive reform plan than Bush's.

When asked in 2010 if he would be willing to make cuts to Social Security, Pence answered, "I think everything has to be on the table." When asked if he would raise the retirement age, he said, "I'm an all-of-the-above guy. We need look at everything on the menu."

== Health care ==
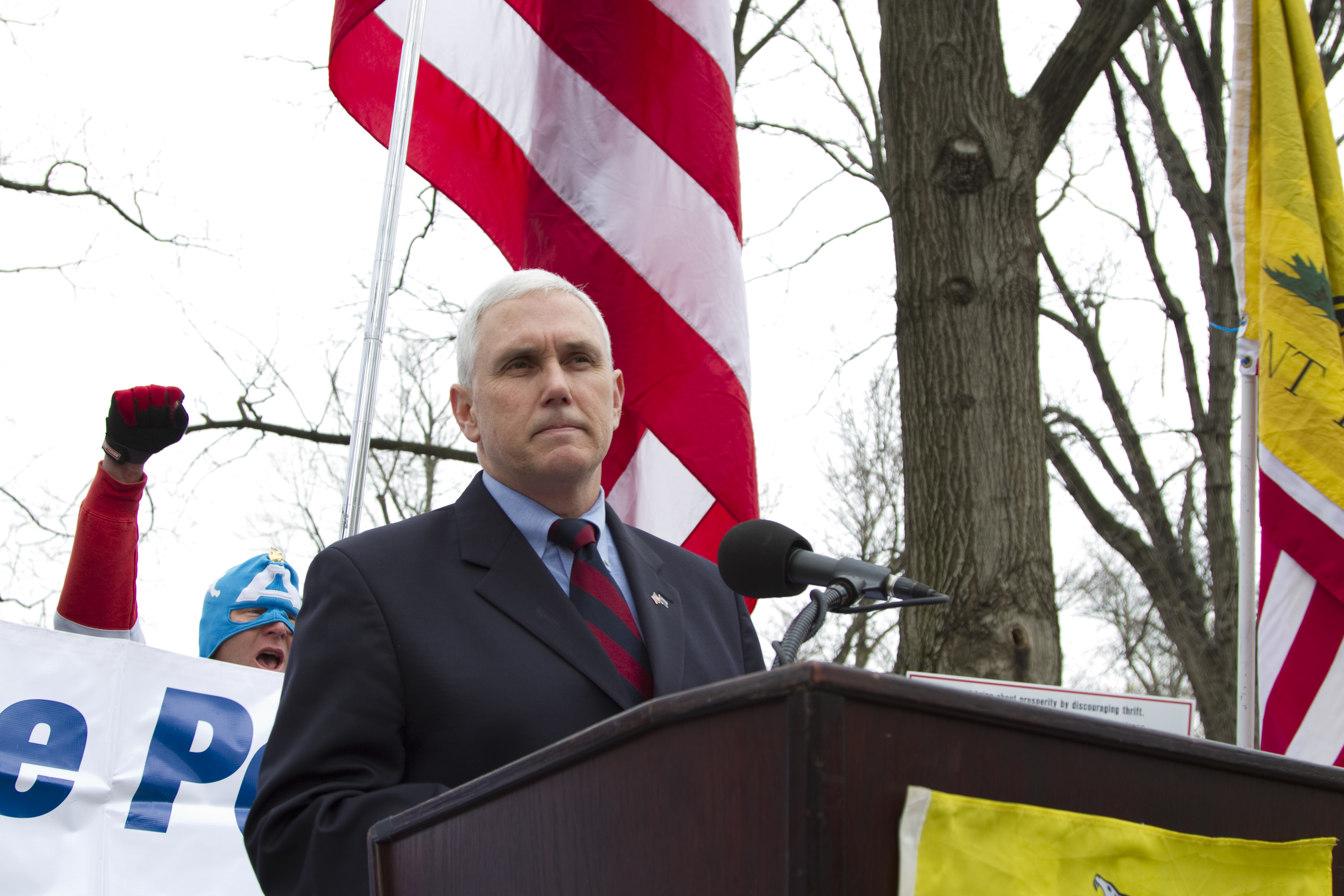
Pence speaking at a Tea Party rally, 2011

Pence voted against the act that created Medicare Part D (a prescription drug benefit) and against the Affordable Care Act (ACA). In June 2012, after the Supreme Court upheld the ACA in NFIB v. Sebelius, Pence likened the ruling to the September 11 attacks in a closed-door meeting of the House Republican Conference. He immediately apologized for making the statement.

Pence wrote an article that appeared on his 2000 congressional campaign website arguing against the tobacco settlement and tobacco regulation, saying they would create "new government bureaucracies" and encroach on private lives. He wrote, "despite the hysteria from the political class and the media, smoking doesn't kill." Pence asserted, "two out of every three smokers does [sic] not die from a smoking related illness and nine out of ten smokers do not contract lung cancer," while acknowledging that "smoking isn't good for you" and people who smoke should quit. In fact, smoking-related deaths comprise two out of three among those who smoke, twice as high as Pence claimed. In 2009, Pence voted against the Family Smoking Prevention and Tobacco Control Act, which allows the Food and Drug Administration to regulate tobacco products. According to the CDC, Pence's state of Indiana has one of the worst smoking problems in America.

Pence was slow to support a needle exchange program in Indiana to combat a major HIV outbreak related to needle-sharing among opioid drug users. While giving credit for the program's ultimate start, an AIDS research foundation director of public policy later deemed the outbreak "entirely preventable". Jerome Adams, Pence's state health commissioner, defended Pence's pace at responding to the situation. Republican state house representative Edward Clere, concerned about the rapid spread of HIV in Scott County, Indiana, urged then-governor Pence to sign an executive order to allow needle exchange programs to operate. After resisting the intervention for over two months, Pence spoke to the county sheriff, prayed for guidance, then finally capitulated in May 2015, signing an executive order that allowed such a program to address the epidemic. The rate of infection spread then slowed dramatically.

In February 2020, after conflicting statements by administration officials via television, it was announced that Pence would control all messaging from government health officials regarding the COVID-19 pandemic.

== Immigration ==
In June 2006, Pence unveiled an immigration plan (which he described as "No Amnesty Immigration reform") that would include increased border security, followed by strict enforcement of laws against hiring illegal aliens, and a guest worker program. This program would have required participants to apply from their home country to government-approved job placement agencies that match workers with employers who cannot find Americans for the job. The plan received support from conservatives such as Dick Armey, but attracted criticism from other conservatives such as Richard Viguerie and paleoconservatives such as Phyllis Schlafly and Pat Buchanan, who, as described by The New York Times, collectively viewed Pence as lending "his conservative prestige to a form of liberal amnesty".

Pence opposes birthright citizenship. Pence asserted in 2018 that the Citizenship Clause of the Fourteenth Amendment to the U.S. Constitution (which provides that "all persons born or naturalized in the United States, and subject to the jurisdiction thereof, are citizens of the United States and of the State wherein they reside") would not apply to "people who are in the country illegally". As a congressman, Pence co-sponsored a bill that would have limited citizenship to children born to at least one parent who is a citizen, immigrants living permanently in the U.S. or non-citizens performing active service in the Armed Forces.

In 2010, Pence voted against the DREAM Act, which would grant the undocumented children of illegal immigrants conditional non-immigrant status if they met certain requirements. In 2010, Pence said Arizona SB 1070, which at the time of passage in the same year was the nation's broadest and strictest anti-illegal immigration legislation, was "a good faith to try and restore order to their communities".

== Patriot Act ==
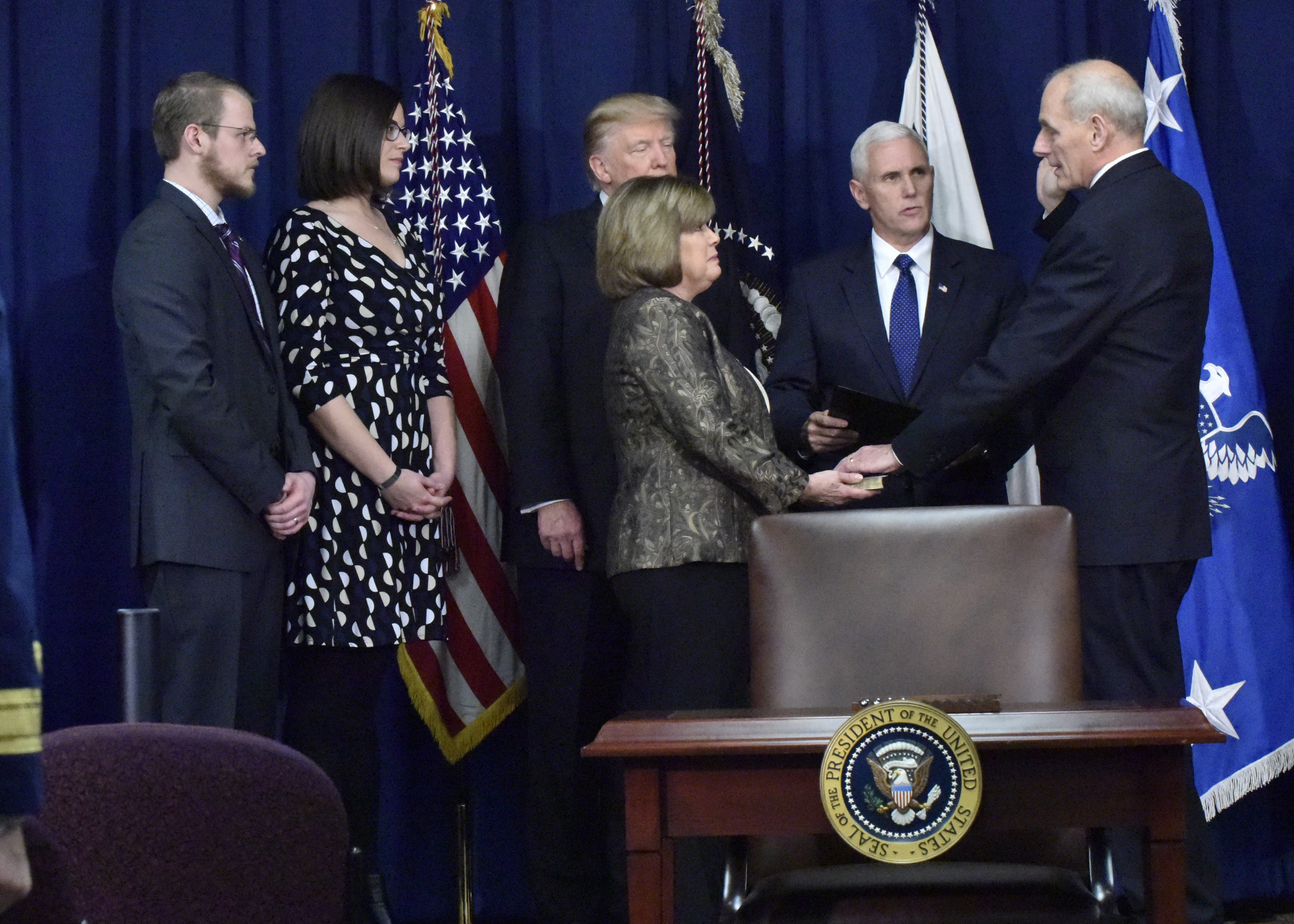
Pence swearing in John F. Kelly, January 25, 2017

Pence supported the Patriot Act on its passage in 2001, and in 2005 called the act "essential to our continued success in the war on terror here at home". He was a sponsor of legislation in 2009 to extend three expiring provisions of the Patriot Act (the library records provision, the roving-wiretap provision, and the lone-wolf provision) for an additional ten years.

== Foreign policy ==
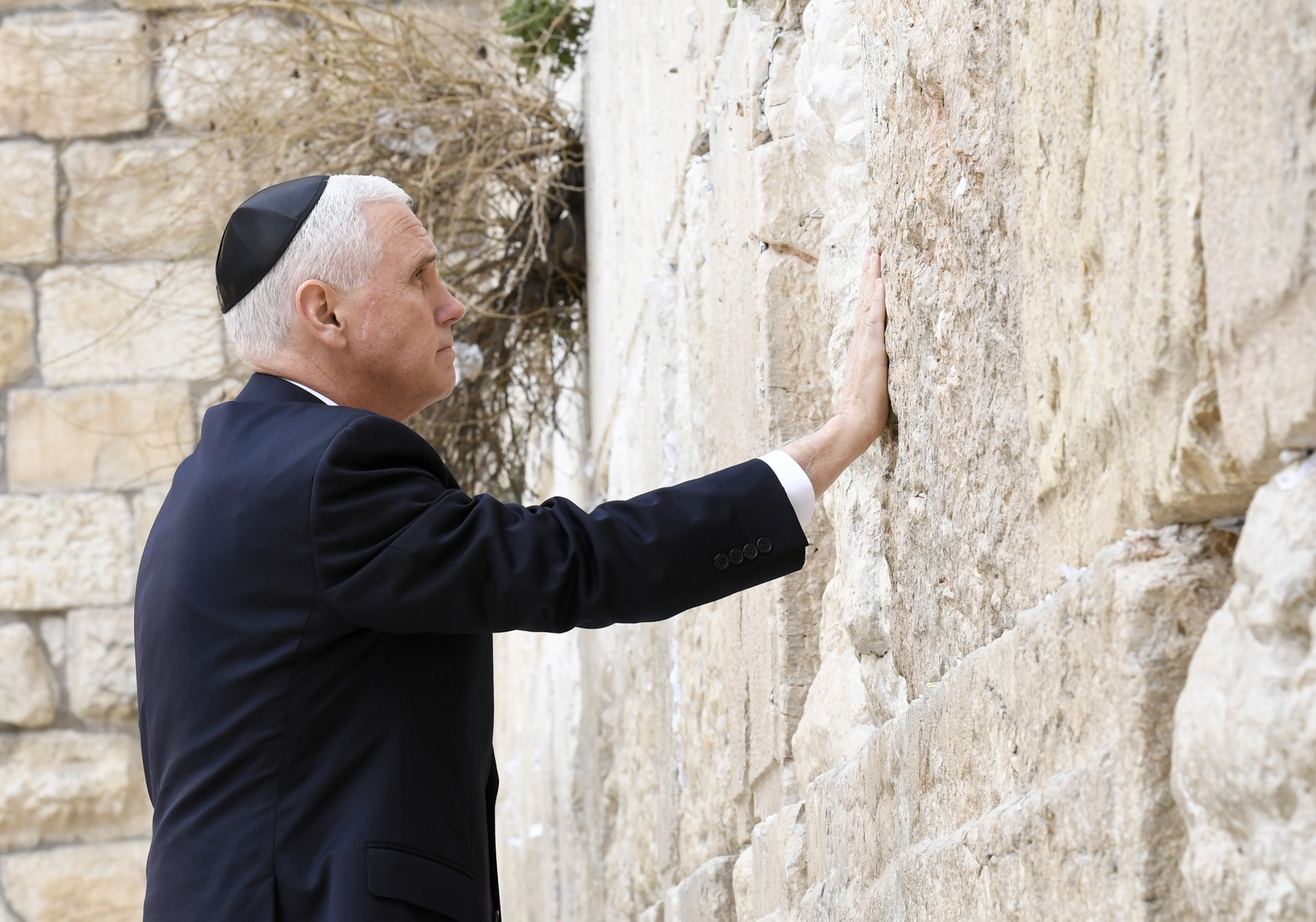
Pence at the Western Wall, January 2018

Pence supported the Iraq War Resolution, which authorized military action against Iraq. During the Iraq War, Pence opposed setting a public withdrawal date from Iraq. During an April 2007 visit to Baghdad, Pence and John McCain visited Shorja market, the site of a deadly attack in February 2007, which had claimed 61 lives. Pence and McCain described the visit as evidence that the security situation in Iraqi markets had improved. The visit to the market took place under tight security, including helicopters overhead, and The New York Times reported that the visit gave a false indication of how secure the area was because of the extremely heavy security forces protecting McCain. Pence chaired the House Foreign Affairs Subcommittee on the Middle East and was a prominent supporter of George W. Bush's Iraq War troop surge of 2007. At the time, Pence said "the surge is working" and defended the initial decision to invade in 2003.

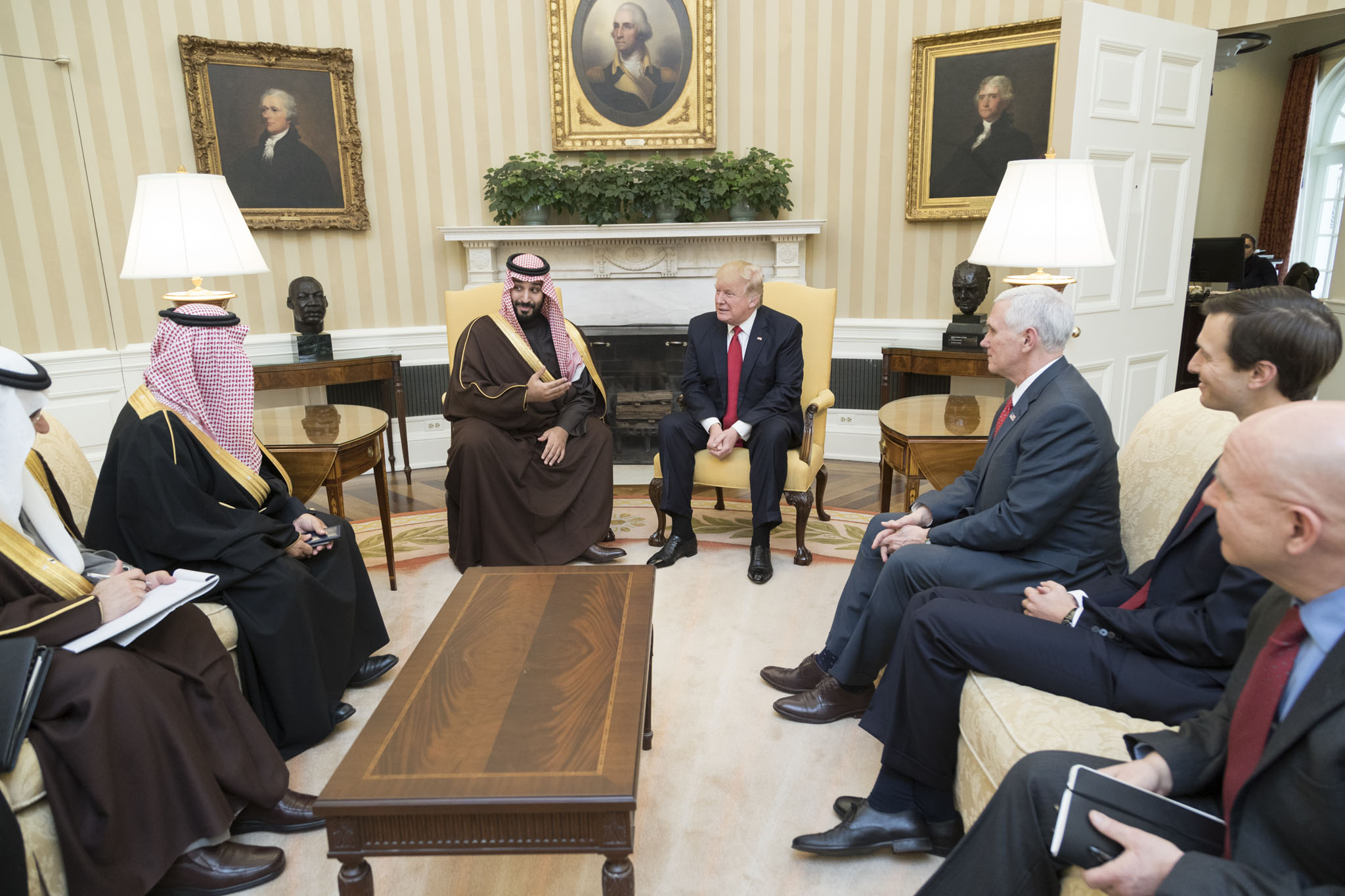
Pence and Trump with Crown Prince of Saudi Arabia Mohammad bin Salman on March 14, 2017

Pence has opposed closing the Guantanamo Bay detention camp and trying the suspected terrorists in the U.S. As an alternative, he has said the "enemy combatants" should be tried in a military tribunal.

Pence has stated his support of Israel and its right to attack facilities in Iran to prevent the Iranians from developing nuclear weapons, has defended the actions of Israel in its use of deadly force in enforcing the blockade of Gaza, and has referred to Israel as "America's most cherished ally". He visited Israel in 2014 to express his support, and in 2016 signed into law a bill which would ban Indiana from having any commercial dealings with a company that boycotts Israel. He opposes a Palestinian state.

Pence criticized Russian president Vladimir Putin and Barack Obama's alleged weak leadership, saying: "When Donald Trump and I observe that, as I've said in Syria, in Iran, in Ukraine, that the small and bullying leader of Russia has been stronger on the world stage than this administration, that's stating painful facts. That's not an endorsement of Vladimir Putin. That's an indictment of the weak and feckless leadership."

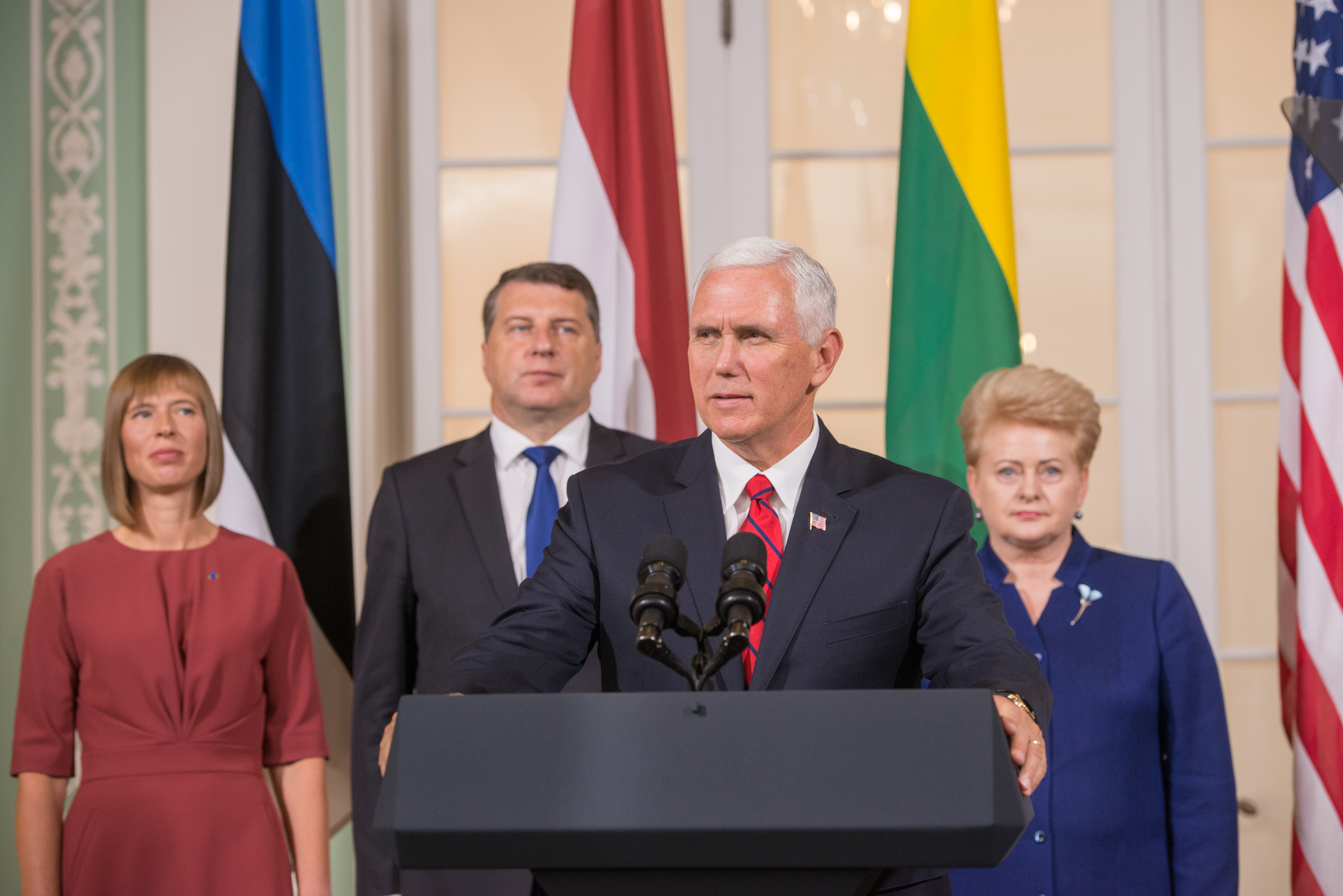
Joint press conference with the Baltic states presidents and Pence, July 31, 2017

Two weeks prior to the NATO intervention in Libya, Pence thanked the Obama administration and secretary of state Hillary Clinton for their efforts to isolate the Muammar Gaddafi regime. Pence expressed support for "a no-fly zone" and said "Gaddafi must go."

Pence condemned the "terrible savagery" against Rohingya Muslims in Myanmar, saying "The images of the violence and its victims have shocked the American people, and decent people all over the world."

Pence called on Turkish president Recep Tayyip Erdoğan to release Andrew Brunson, an American pastor detained in the post-coup purges in Turkey. On August 1, 2018, the U.S. Department of Treasury imposed sanctions on two senior Turkish government ministers who were involved in the detention of Brunson. Erdoğan said the U.S. behavior will force Turkey to look for new friends and allies.

On July 26, 2018, Pence raised the Xinjiang re-education camps issue at Ministerial to Advance Religious Freedom, saying that "Sadly, as we speak as well, Beijing is holding hundreds of thousands, and possibly millions, of Uyghur Muslims in so-called "re-education camps", where they're forced to endure around-the-clock political indoctrination and to denounce their religious beliefs and their cultural identity as the goal."

=== International trade ===
Pence "has been a longtime, aggressive advocate of trade deals" between the U.S. and foreign countries. Pence has been a supporter of the North American Free Trade Agreement, and during his tenure in the House, he voted for every free-trade agreement that came before him. Pence voted in favor of the Central American Free Trade Agreement; in favor of keeping the U.S. in the World Trade Organization; and in favor of permanent normal trade relations with China. Pence also supported bilateral free-trade agreements with Colombia, South Korea, Panama, Peru, Oman, Chile, and Singapore. Pence's strong stance in favor of free trade sharply differed from the stance of his running mate Trump, who has condemned globalization and the liberalization of trade.

Pence voted against the Trade and Globalization Act of 2007, which would have expanded Trade Adjustment Assistance to American workers adversely affected by globalization. However, in 2014, Pence called for the "swift adoption" of the Trans-Pacific Partnership, urging Indiana's congressional delegation to support the trade deal.

== Climate change ==
Pence "does not accept the scientific consensus that human activity is the primary driver of climate change". In a 2001 op-ed, Pence called global warming "a myth" and added that "the earth is actually cooler today than it was about 50 years ago". In 2006 and 2009, Pence expressed the view that it was unclear whether global warming was driven by human activity, and in 2009 he told political commentator Chris Matthews that there was a "growing skepticism in the scientific community about global warming". In 2009, Pence led the Republican effort to defeat the American Clean Energy and Security Act (Waxman-Markey), a Democratic-backed bill to cut greenhouse gas emissions (and therefore combat climate change) through a cap-and-trade system.

On September 27, 2016, however, Pence said "there's no question" that human activity affects both the climate and the environment. Pence holds a lifetime rating of four percent from the League of Conservation Voters. While in the House, Pence "voted to eliminate funding for climate education programs and to prohibit the Environmental Protection Agency from regulating greenhouse gas emissions". Pence also "repeatedly voted against energy efficiency and renewable energy funding and rules" and voted "for several bills that supported fossil fuel development, including legislation promoting offshore drilling".

== Crime and illegal drugs ==
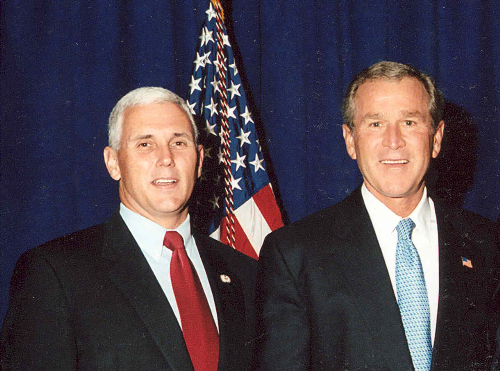
Pence and George W. Bush, 2007

Pence has questioned proposals to decrease penalties for low-level marijuana offenses in Indiana, saying the state should focus on "reducing crime, not reducing penalties". In 2013, he expressed concern that a then-pending bill to revise the state's criminal code was not tough enough on drug crimes, and successfully lobbied to limit the reduction in sentencing of marijuana offenses.

In 2016, Pence signed into law a measure that would reinstate a ten-year mandatory minimum prison sentence for certain drug offenders.

During 2014, Pence sent a letter to U.S. attorney general Eric Holder, saying Indiana would not comply with federal prison rape elimination standards because they were "too expensive". According to the Indiana Department of Correction, it would cost the state $15–20 million annually to comply with the guidelines. Pence said a number of rape prevention measures had already been "implemented".

In 2015, Pence signed Senate Bill 94 to lengthen the statute of limitations for rape—continuing for five years after sufficient DNA evidence is uncovered, enough recorded evidence is brought forth or discovered, or the offender confesses to the crime. Pence also signed Senate Bill 8 to allow the death penalty for beheadings if the victim was alive at the time of the offense.

== Gambling ==
Pence has been an advocate of federal restrictions on online gambling. In 2006, he was one of 35 cosponsors of H.R. 4411, the Goodlatte–Leach Internet Gambling Prohibition Act, and H.R. 4777, the Internet Gambling Prohibition Act.

== Campaign finance ==
Pence praised the 2010 Supreme Court ruling in Citizens United v. FEC when it was announced. He said:

Freedom won today in the Supreme Court. Today's ruling in the Citizens United case takes us one step closer to the Founding Fathers' vision of free speech, a vision that is cherished by all Americans and one Congress has a responsibility to protect. If the freedom of speech means anything, it means protecting the right of private citizens to voice opposition or support for their elected representatives. The fact that the court overturned a 20-year precedent speaks volumes about the importance of this issue.

Pence described the Bipartisan Campaign Reform Act, which regulates the financing of political campaigns, as "oppressive restrictions on free speech".

== Presidential impeachment ==
In the late 1990s, Pence supported the president Bill Clinton's impeachment. Arguing for the moral requirements of the office of the presidency, Pence wrote that an American president with "bad moral habits" can "incinerate the planet", thus nothing less than a president who represents "all of our highest hopes and ideals and values" could be accepted. Pence also brought up "staggering rates of illegitimacy and divorce", mandating that "America needs to be able to look to her First Family as role models."
