= Jericho March =

Pro-Trump prayer coalition

- Classification: Political and religious coalition
- Leaders: Robert Weaver; Arina Grossu

The Jericho March is a loose, pro-Trump, Christian coalition who pray, fast, and march for what they claim to be election integrity and transparency in response to Donald Trump's accusations of voter fraud in the 2020 presidential election, in which then-President Donald Trump lost to Joe Biden. Following this, people affiliated with the movement started fasting, praying, and marching daily around their state capitols, and sought divine intervention to overturn the election results. Other groups held their own independent events as part of the 2020–21 United States election protests.

== Background ==
Former national security advisor Michael Flynn likened the protesters at Stop the Steal events to the biblical soldiers and priests breaching the walls of Jericho in the Battle of Jericho. Organizers of Stop the Steal and church groups urged supporters of former U.S. President Donald Trump to participate in "Jericho Marches" and prayer rallies in Washington, D.C., to protest Trump's election loss and try to overturn the result.

Jericho, as mentioned in Joshua 6, was a city of false gods and corruption. Just as Joshua and the Israelites were instructed to march around Jericho seven times, during the Jericho Marches, participants walked around seven times, praying, singing songs, and blowing shofars. The group engaged in a number of peaceful protests in the past, including at the Madison, Wisconsin Capitol building in November 2020.

The group's co-founders are Robert Weaver and Arina Grossu. Weaver, an evangelical Oklahoma insurance salesman, was nominated by Trump to lead the Indian Health Service but withdrew after The Wall Street Journal reported that he misrepresented his qualifications. Grossu, who is Catholic, recently worked as a contract communications adviser at the Department of Health and Human Services.

Sociologist Brad Christerson and religion scholar Matthew D. Taylor argue that prophets such as Cindy Jacobs and Lance Wallnau in the New Apostolic Reformation (and broader Independent Network Charismatic Christianity) movement were important figures in the Jericho Marches. They claim additionally that the particular theological beliefs of this form of neo-Charismatic Christianity such as spiritual warfare shaped the events and "[provided] the religious motivation for the fight to overturn the election".

Some, such as conservative Orthodox Christian writer Rod Dreher, have argued that participants in the march were engaging in "Trump worship", akin to idolatry. In National Review, Cameron Hilditch described the movement as such:

A toxic ideological cocktail of grievance, paranoia, and self-exculpatory rage was on display at the "Jericho March," ... Their aim was to "stop the steal" of the presidential election, to prepare patriots for battle against a "One-World Government," and to sell pillows at a 25 percent discount. ... In fact, there was a strange impression given throughout the event that attendees believe Christianity is, in some sense, consubstantial with American nationalism. It was as if a new and improved Holy Trinity of "Father, Son, and Uncle Sam" had taken the place of the old and outmoded Nicene version. When Eric Metaxas, the partisan radio host and emcee for the event, first stepped on stage, he wasn't greeted with psalm-singing or with hymns of praise to the Holy Redeemer, but with chants of "USA! USA!" In short, the Jericho rally was a worrying example of how Christianity can be twisted and drafted into the service of a political ideology.

== Relation to the 2021 Capitol attack ==
Emma Green in The Atlantic blamed the Jericho March and other pro-Trump Christians for the storming of the Capitol building on January 6, 2021. In response to the events, Jericho March said:

Jericho March denounces any and all acts of violence and destruction, including any that took place at the U.S. Capitol on January 6, 2021. Jericho March has a history of totally peaceful marches and we have not, did not, and never will condone violence or destruction. Our mission is peace and prayer. It is the mission and goal of Jericho March to exercise and pray for our religious freedoms and other freedoms under the First Amendment of the Constitution of the United States.

A 2022 joint report from the Baptist Joint Committee for Religious Liberty and Freedom From Religion Foundation on the role of Christian nationalism in the event discusses the Jericho Marches, stating, "Jericho March accustomed people to marching on the halls of power, just as they did on November 14 and as they would on January 6. ...The biblical allusion made violence the implicit goal of the march. In the Bible, Joshua's army marched around Jericho for several days; the insurrectionists marched in multiple locations across the span of several weeks. Both culminated in violence."

In response to public reports of possible armed protests by violent groups through January 24, 2021, Jericho March put out a second statement temporarily suspending "local self-led marches" for the security and safety of individuals and groups on prayer marches, adding: "Jericho March asks all people of faith to continue to pray and fast for unity and peace in our nation at noon every day from wherever they are."

== Inauguration of Joe Biden ==
In the weekend before the inauguration of Joe Biden, independent prayer groups continued to hold their own peaceful prayer marches as they had done throughout. The Jericho March in South Dakota "has met at the state Capitol every Sunday since the start of December, according to Bureau of Administration spokesperson Leah Svendsen. There have been no issues or arrests involving the Jericho Group during those events, Department of Public Safety spokesman Tony Mangan said." One of the people who was interviewed said, "We're here to pray...The media has really gotten a lot of things wrong lately. We're just Americans with rosaries." A local NBC station covered the story.
