= The Trump Prophecy =

2018 Christian drama film

- The Trump Prophecy film poster
- Directed by: Stephan Schultze
- Written by: Rick Eldridge; Jimmy Hager
- Produced by: Scotty Curlee; Rick Eldridge
- Starring: Chris Nelson; Paulette Todd; Karen Boles; Don Brooks
- Cinematography: Micah Johnson
- Music by: Elliott McGrath
- Production companies: ReelWorksStudios; Film Guardian
- Distributed by: Fathom Events
- Release date: October 2, 2018
- Running time: 120 minutes
- Country: United States
- Budget: $2 million
- Box office: $671,198

The Trump Prophecy (also known as The Trump Prophecy: A Voice of Hope; A Movement of Prayer) is a 2018 Christian drama film based on a story by Orlando-based retired firefighter Mark Taylor that he named "The Commander-in-Chief Prophecy". It is a collaboration between ReelWorksStudios and Liberty University's Cinematic Arts program, and is the school's second involvement in a theatrically released motion picture after another Christian film, Extraordinary (2017). ReelWorksStudios is owned by Rick Eldridge, who produced the film, and the school's Cinematic Arts department is handled by Stephen Schultze, the film's director.

The film stars Chris Nelson as Taylor, who has post-traumatic stress disorder (PTSD) after a house fire that kills a young boy (Landon Starns). In April 2011, after a prayer from his wife (Karen Boles), he dreams that Donald Trump would one day become president of the United States. By the time near the 2016 election, Mary Colbert (Paulette Todd) learns about the message and starts a national prayer chain to make God's wish of Trump becoming president come true.

There are two parts of The Trump Prophecy: the narrative part about Taylor's experiences that makes up around three quarters of the film, and an interview segment with well-known speakers in the evangelical Christian and conservative circles of the United States.

Described by Vox as a depiction of Christian nationalism in the United States, The Trump Prophecy was released in a time when the idea that God was responsible for Trump winning the election was shared by several evangelical leaders, like Franklin Graham, Richard Land, and Robert Jeffress. It was screened in theaters only on the days of October 2 and October 4, 2018, landing at number 22 on the weekly American box office chart with $671,198 grossed. Making less than its $2,000,000 budget, the film garnered negative reviews from critics.

The Trump Prophecy's producers denied any political motive behind the film. Nevertheless, it was viewed by some Christian commentators, film critics, and Liberty University students as political propaganda. Facebook blocked advertisements for the film for being political, and a Liberty University student started an online petition trying to stop the film that was signed by more than 2,000 people.

== Plot ==
In 2005, Mark Taylor (Chris Nelson), an American Christian firefighter married to a fire dispatcher named Mary Jo (Karen Boles), carries a dead young boy (Landon Starns) out of a crackhouse fire. He has had fever dreams relating to the incident since then, which prompts his doctor (Todd McLaren) to diagnose him as having post-traumatic stress disorder. However, he is not taking his prescribed medication and retires from his position as a firefighter.

Taylor spends the next six years descending into his PTSD-infused situation, facing hypersomnia and nightmares about being taken hostage by a fire demon from hell (Darrell Nelson) while watching television to numb the illness. Mary Jo notices these episodes and prays to God to help her husband; the prayer works, as Mark dreams about a glowing orb that explodes electrical energy onto him. While hearing Donald Trump on television news, Taylor receives a message from God, which he writes down in a journal, informing him, "You're hearing the voice of president [sic]." By the time of the 2012 election, Taylor hopes God's wish will be fulfilled. However, Trump does not make it as a nominee and Barack Obama wins instead.

Taylor continues journaling accounts of his dreams and hearings from God up until the start of the 2016 United States presidential election, when he shares his writings with his doctor, Don Colbert (Don Brooks) and his wife, Mary (Paulette Todd). Mary notices a "rhythm of truth" when reading them and builds up a national prayer chain so that Trump will be president and, in turn, Taylor will be relieved of his disorder. She obtains participants by calling others via phone and instructs them to use a shofar in order to increase the chances of Trump winning the election.

Despite several news reports of the unlikelihood of Trump being elected, the miracle occurs as he wins, leaving Mark and Mary Taylor happy and relieved. Worldwide coverage of Mary Colbert's shofar group influences Israelis to start their own group of people blowing the horn. The Trump Prophecy ends with interviews of "a panel of world leaders," those being notable conservatives and evangelicals, answering political questions.

== Cast ==
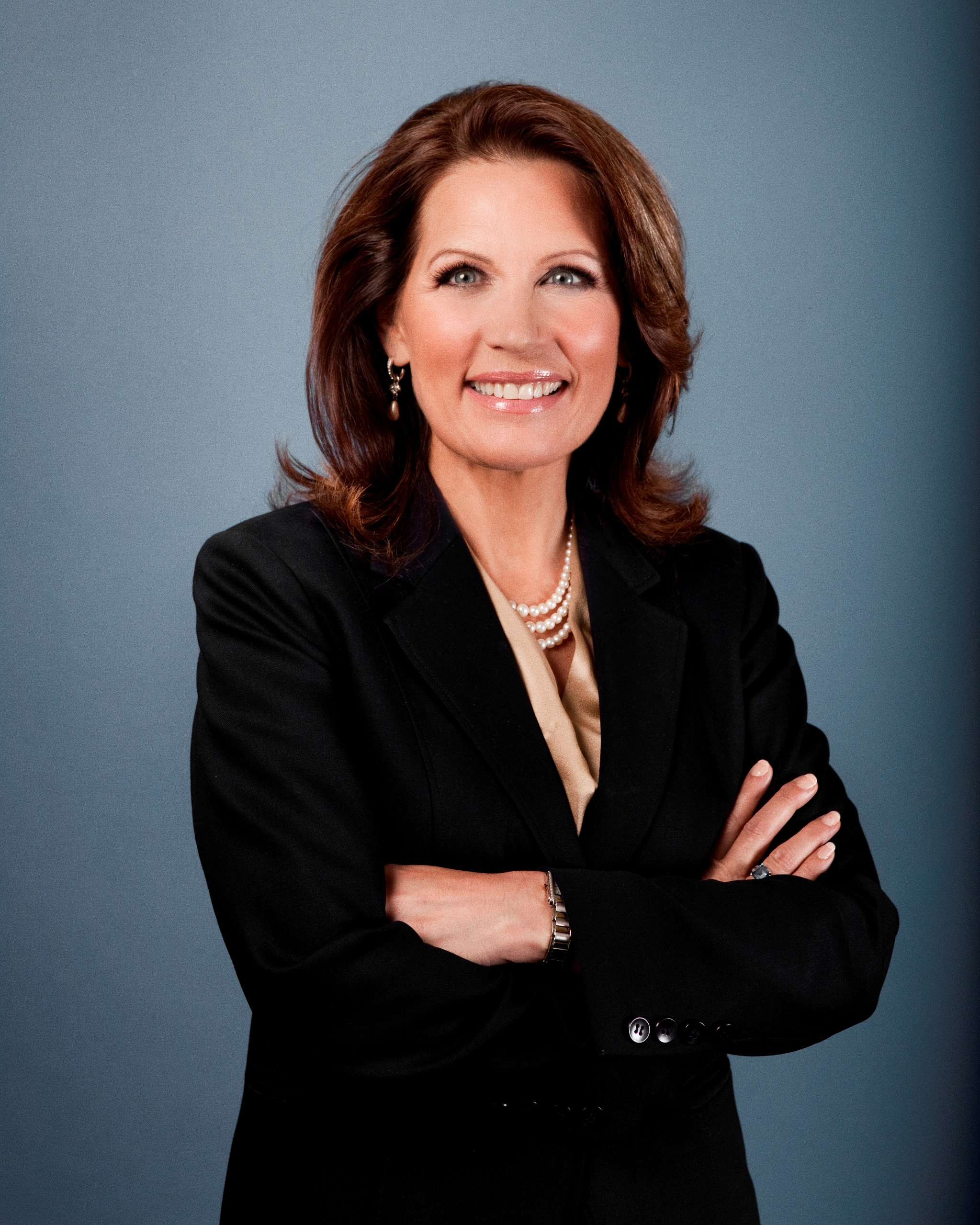
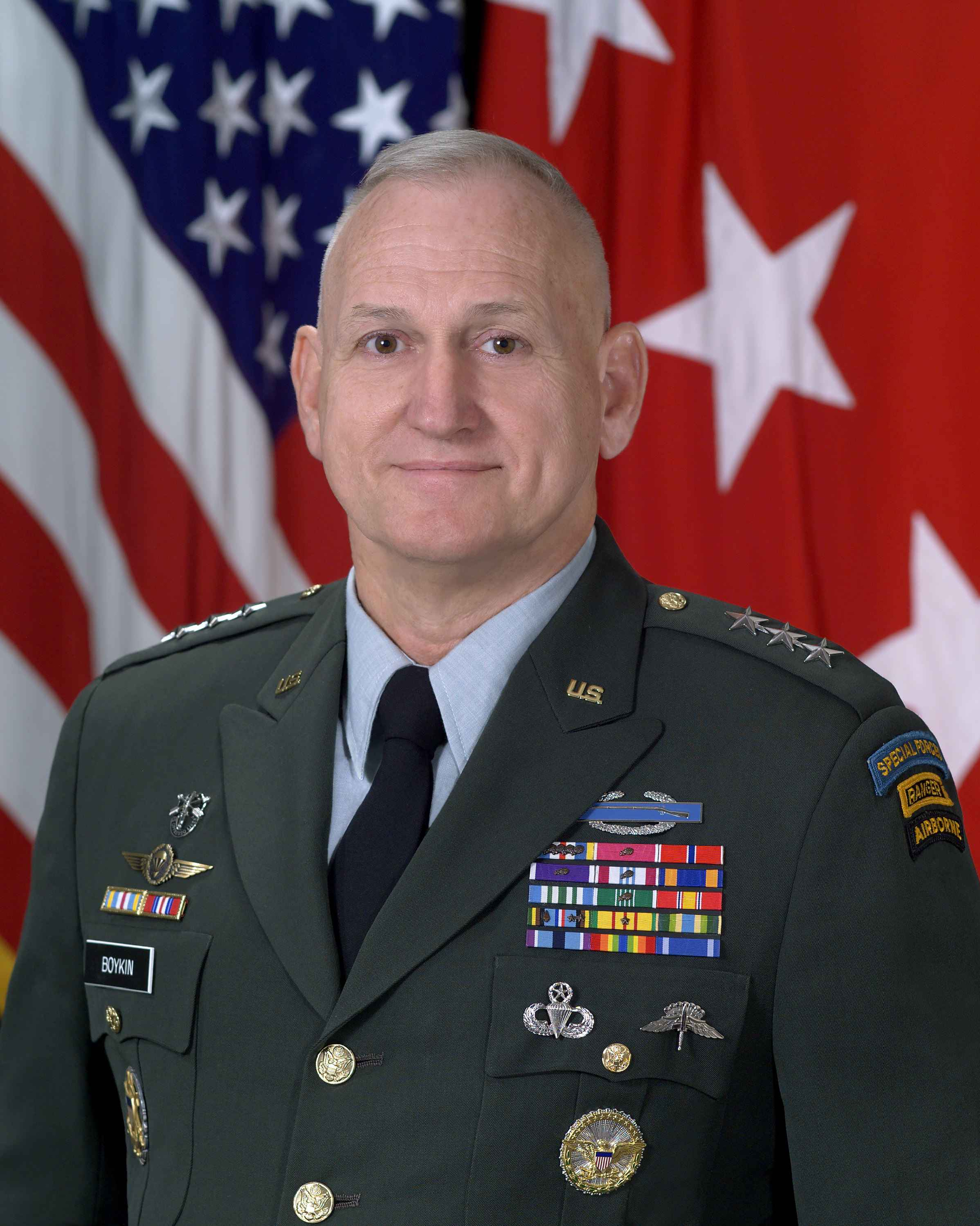
The Trump Prophecy ends with interviews of notable conservatives and evangelicals like Michele Bachmann (left) and William G. Boykin (right).
- Chris Nelson, a theater teacher at Liberty University, as Mark Taylor, a retired firefighter with PTSD who, in 2011, was told by God that businessman Donald Trump would become president.
- Paulette Todd as Mary Colbert, who starts a national prayer call service to fulfill God's wish to Taylor of making Trump president
- Karen Boles as Mary Jo Taylor, Mark's wife and a former fire dispatcher
- Don Brooks as Dr. Don Colbert, Mary Colbert's husband who is treating Mark Taylor
- Michael Johnson as Dr. Vander, another one of Mark's doctors
- Darrell Nelson as Mark's grandfather and the fire demon that repeatedly appears in Taylor's nightmares
- Paul Stober as the chief of the fire department Mark Taylor worked for
- Landon Starns as the young boy who dies in a house fire in 2005, a tragedy that traumatizes Mark Taylor to the point that he has frequent nightmares about it
- Rachel Behrmann as a heroin-addicted woman who starts the house fire by accident
- Sabrina Nelson as the young boy's sister
- Todd McLaren as a family doctor who diagnoses Mark with PTSD
- Luis Vazquez and Scotty Curlee as Taylor's firefighting colleagues
- Andy Geffken, Denise Thomas, and Austin Russell as D.J., Billye Brim, and George respectively, three of the many people Mary Colbert calls in getting participants for the prayer movement
- Michele Bachmann, David Barton, Lance Wallnau, and William G. Boykin appear as interviewees at the end of the film
- Donald Trump as himself (archival footage). The television footage used for The Trump Prophecy was from a CNN interview with him by John King on April 28, 2011.

== Background ==
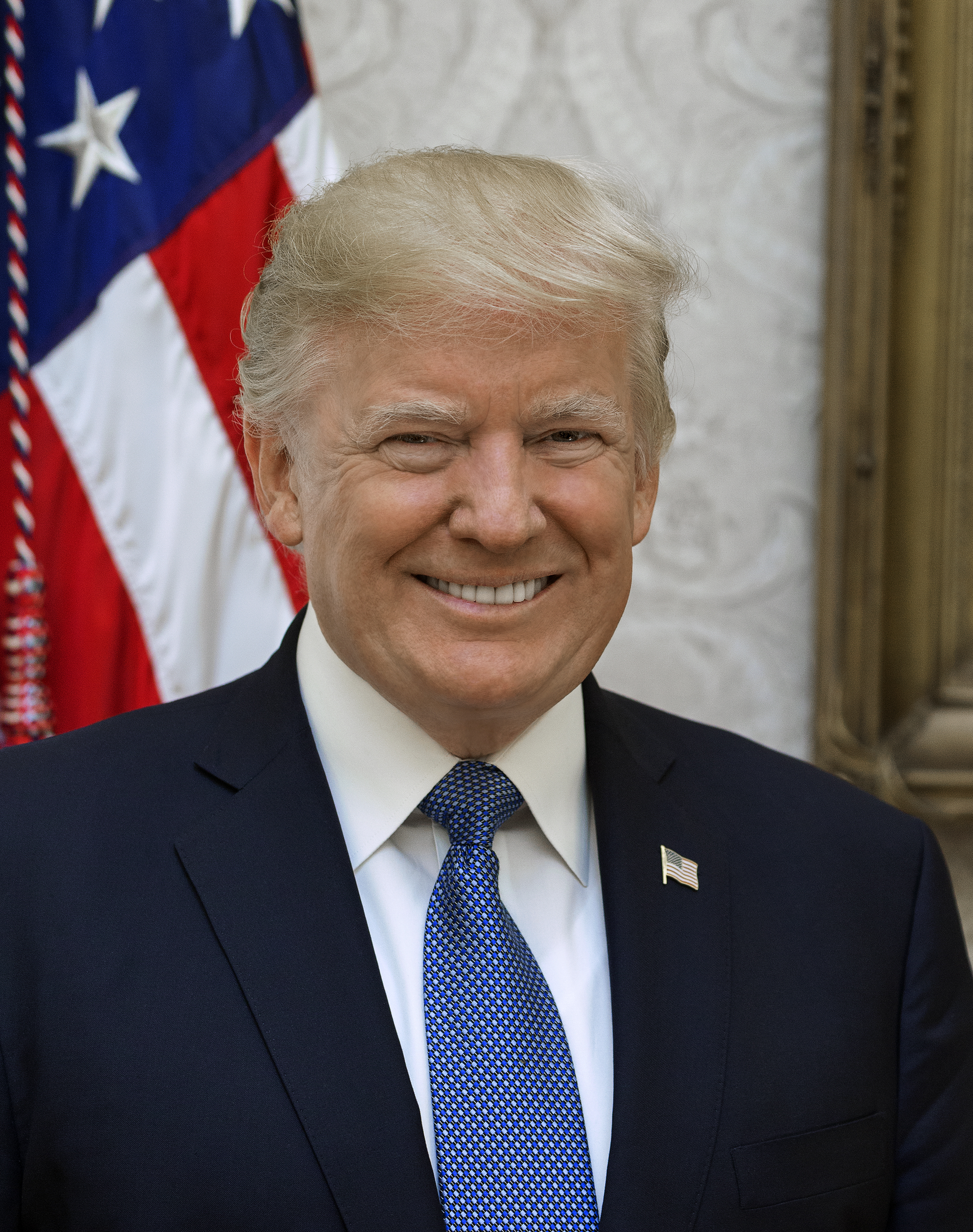
Donald Trump's official 2017 White House portrait. The Trump Prophecy is based on an Orlando firefighter's claim of receiving a message from God in 2011 predicting Trump's presidency.

Mark Taylor, a retired Orlando-based firefighter that the film follows, has claimed many prophecies on platforms like YouTube and his book The Trump Prophecies: The Astonishing True Story of the Man Who Saw Tomorrow... and What He Says Is Coming Next (2017), released by Defender Publishing on Independence Day 2017. His claims, "thoroughly characterized by war metaphors", have been described by professional writers as "radical" conspiracy theories and "outlandish". The Trump Prophecy is about one of Taylor's prophecies, which he named "The Commander in Chief Prophecy". The prophecy was that on April 28, 2011, while listening to a television interview with American businessman Donald Trump, he heard God say that "you're hearing the voice of a president" and that a stronger relationship between the United States and Israel will occur in the future.

Shortly before the 2016 election, Mary Colbert, an international ministry networker, met Taylor because her husband, Dr. Don Colbert, was treating him. Taylor gave her the journals of God's messages, and she felt they needed to be spread around to the world; thus, she started a phone-based prayer chain that garnered approximately 100,000 callers per day, a number so high it shut down two servers. Trump won, and after the 2016 election, numerous evangelical leaders such as Richard Land, Franklin Graham, and Robert Jeffress made statements that God was responsible for the Republican nominee's victory. According to HuffPost, the fact that a big Christian university like Liberty University would produce a film promoting the idea is an indicator of how widespread it was at the time of its release.

== Production ==
On Thanksgiving Day in 2017, Rick Eldridge, a troubled and legally embattled film producer and owner of the Charlotte, North Carolina–based studio ReelWorks Studios, pitched the idea of a film adaptation of Taylor's book to Stephan Schultze, who was the executive director of Liberty University's Cinematic Arts group. The program had previously been involved in the making of five feature films, as it attempted to incorporate one full-length movie every year into its curriculum. One of its past projects, Extraordinary (2017), was released in 600 theaters nationwide, making it the first film in the United States to be both theatrically distributed and produced by school students. The Cinematic Arts program first announced a film adaptation of the real-life Taylor's book The Trump Prophecies (2017) on January 26, 2018; it revealed that it was going to be named Commander and have its theatrical release date be in October.

The Trump Prophecy is a production of Rick Eldridge's ReelWorks Studios, in cooperation with the film department of Liberty University, the evangelical Christian school founded by Jerry Falwell. It was directed by Stephan Schultze, the head of Liberty University's film program, and made with the help of many of the school's film students. The film was made by 63 students, as well as school staff, and served as a spring semester project for the students, as it was shot from March to April 2018 in Lynchburg and Bedford, Virginia. $1 million was raised by Eldridge for the film's production, while another million was used for post-production and distribution, totaling the budget to $2 million. Eldridge, who had a career as a musician before working in film, wrote "The Greater Good," the film's theme song.

== Concepts ==
The Trump Prophecy's official press release marketed the film as "an inspirational message of Hope, highlighting the vast beauty and greatness of The United States [and] its electoral process." Vox journalist Tara Isabella Burton labeled The Trump Prophecy as a true portrait of Christian nationalism in the United States.

The film's focus on prophecy comes from the ideas of miracles and prophecies by a Pentecostal evangelical movement named the New Apostolic Reformation (NAR); Taylor has been described as enjoying high status in the NAR movement because of his prophecies. The NAR follows dominion theology, which states that the world must turn Christian in order for the Second Coming to occur. Several evangelicals suggest Trump's moving of the Israeli embassy, which is heavily praised by those interviewed in the end of the film, is a step towards fulfilling the dominion theology. Some of the film's interviewees, like Bachmann, Wallnau, and Barton, are NAR members, and the real-life Don Colbert has regularly appeared on shows run by NAR associates, including Ken Copeland and Jim Bakker.

A major theme in the film is its promotion of authority and hierarchy. Burton opines that the film informs its audience not to resist Trump as doing so would disrespect the real authority of God. The same type of reasoning has been used by people close to Trump, such as Jeff Sessions, Paula White, and Robert Jeffress, to excuse his actions, such as the family separation policy. The film references passages in the Bible about Cyrus the Great, which many Christian fans of Trump have compared him to. The movie's authority element extends into its presentation of domestic families, where a female submits to the permissions and demands of a male. Colbert does not start the Trump prayer chain until her husband gives permission to do so, and Mary Jo Taylor is very submissive to her husband, to the point where she gave up her fire dispatching job.

The film's praise for Trump's activity in office is only brought up in its interview segment, where they applaud his relocation of the Israeli embassy to Jerusalem. The narrative rarely presents how fit he is to become president; the only depiction of his character is that he does not share the same evangelical values as most of his supporters. When Mary Colbert asks other evangelicals to participate in the prayer chain, they admit to not being fans of the Republican candidate. This religious disconnect and the message of God that Mark Taylor receives indicates that Christians are voting for Trump not because of his qualities, but because they are following the person God chose to lead the country.

Art lecturer and writer Emily Pothast categorized The Trump Prophecy as "an accidental advertisement for a quasi-socialist utopia", as it shows American public sector workers like Mark Taylor being very wealthy and having easy and heavily encouraged access to health care by the time they retire.

== Release ==
Using promotion from channels like Fox News Radio and The Blaze, and evangelical leaders such as Jim Bakker, The Trump Prophecy was screened by Fathom Events in 1,200 theaters throughout the U.S. on October 2 and 4, 2018. Eldridge claimed that his expectations of The Trump Prophecy's commercial performance were exceeded. It was number 22 on the weekly box office chart on the week of its release, grossing $671,198. According to Eldridge, the film garnered 18,000 pre-sold tickets and, as of October 3, 2018, more than double the ticket sales. While screenings in locations such as Union Square, Manhattan, and Lynchburg, Virginia were reported by sources to have very small attendance, Eldridge reported that there were "quite a few screenings across the country that were sold out." The Trump Prophecy was issued on DVD by GVN Releasing on March 12, 2019.

== Reception ==
While audience response towards The Trump Prophecy was mediocre at best, professional journalists were much harsher on the film. Not including opinions about the film's political undertones, Pothast was disappointed that it was not as "weird and unhinged" as she hoped, and Burton criticized the filler that made up "[around] 75 minutes" of the film, such as scenes of discussions between Mark and Mary Taylor and an unresolved subplot involving Mark selling his boat. However, she also wrote that the film is essential to watch in order for non-Christians to learn the reality of American Christian nationalism. A review from The Film Magazine was a detailed summary of technical problems of the movie, not only of the amount of filler but also the "shallow and pedantic" dialogue, poor acting, "amateur" and "dull" shot composition, and the unintentionally funny visual effects.

== Controversy ==
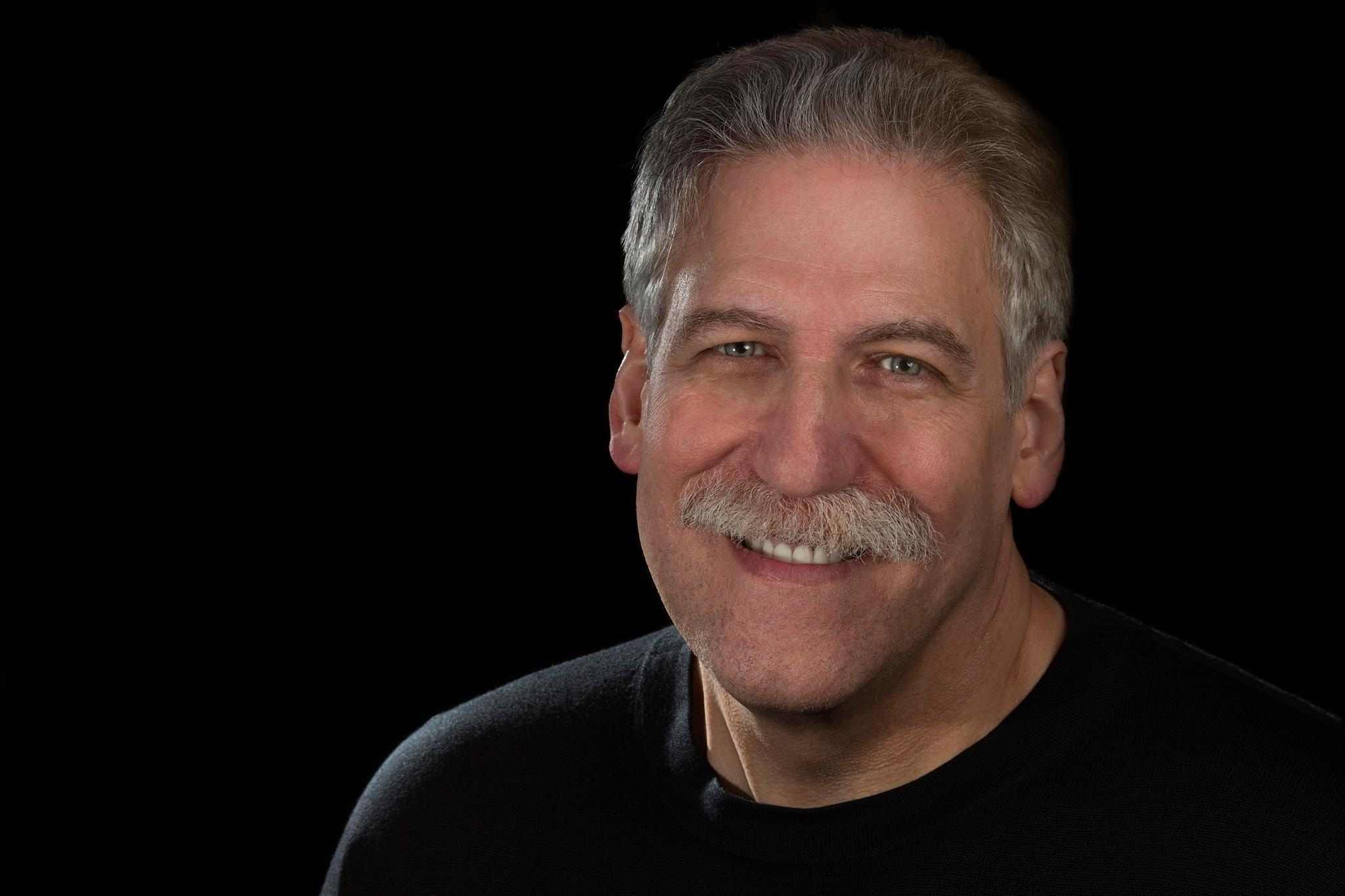
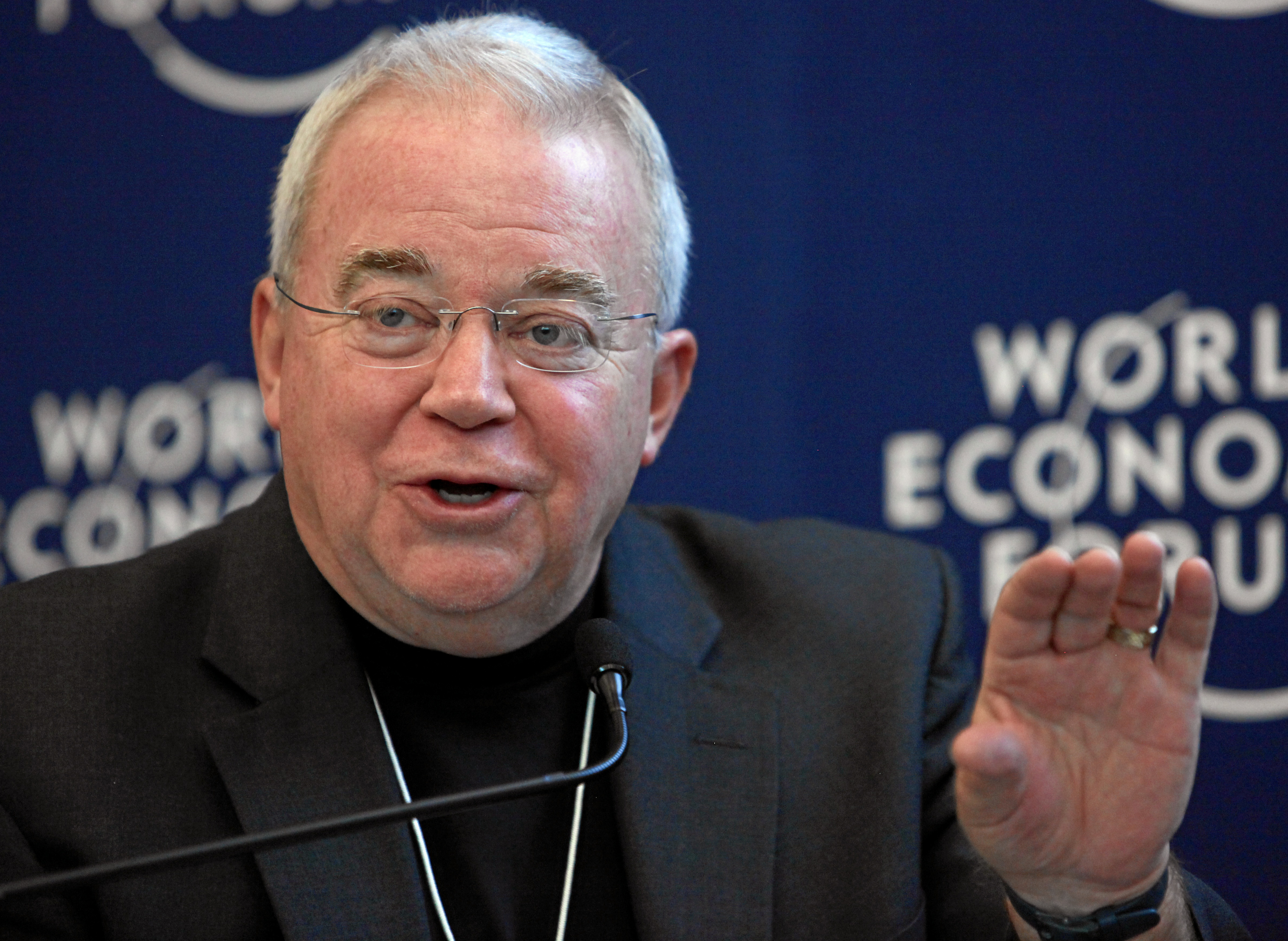
Concerns about The Trump Prophecy's effects on American politics came from Christian apologists and commentators such as Michael L. Brown (left) and Jim Wallis (right).

Due to the overwhelming support of Trump from Liberty University president Jerry Falwell Jr. and the film's release date being scheduled only a month before the midterm elections, Christian commentators such as Samuel Smith, Michael L. Brown, and Jim Wallis expressed concern about the film's possible negative effects on the American political climate before it was distributed. Brown, who believed in religious prophecy, worried that the film would inspire evangelical Christian viewers to take on a form of "hyper-patriotism" that compared America and its leadership to God, and Wallis called the message of the film "heretical".

Fox News reported on June 21, 2018 that Facebook blocked ads from ReelWorks Studios promoting The Trump Prophecy for meeting the social media platform's definition of "political" content, although Eldridge and the film's male lead, Chris Nelson, reasoned that Facebook judged the ads only by their inclusion of the word Trump.

Shortly after The Trump Prophecy's January 2018 announcement, a Liberty University student began a petition on Change.org objecting to the film. The petition's concern was that the film endorsed a man who performed actions in his office that were contrary to Jesus' teachings on helping marginalized groups of people. It also suggested that students would have a harder time finding work in more liberal-aligned companies. By the time of the film's premiere on October 2, the petition garnered 2,286 signees.

When The Trump Prophecy was released, critical reviews were published that expressed disgust with the film, as they were alarmed by the fact that Liberty University, a powerful evangelical company, invested in a film that they saw as presenting a disturbing message and legitimized the beliefs of a "radical" conspiracy theorist like Taylor. The Film Magazine described it as "a glorification of ignoring real solutions to mental illness that takes a turn into political propaganda."

The producers of The Trump Prophecy denied any controversial political motive behind the film. While Eldridge predicted the backlash The Trump Prophecy received, he explained that the film was meant to ask "a divided nation" to pray for authority because humans are "called" to do so in the Bible.
