= Brian Brennt =

American preacher, author and teacher (1964-2021)

- Born: 1964; Portland, Oregon
- Died: November 4, 2021 (aged 56–57)
- Citizenship: United States
- Education: Pacific Lutheran University (PLU)
- Occupations: Preacher, author and teacher
- Known for: Cofounder of Circuit Riders and The Send
- Website: www.brianbrennt.com

Brian Brennt (1964 – November 4, 2021) was an American preacher, author and teacher. He cofounded Circuit Riders (with Andy Byrd, of the YWAM) and The Send (with Lou Engle and others).

He died in 2021, from an autoimmune disease.

== Education ==
Brennt studied at Pacific Lutheran University (PLU), earning a degree in marketing. He reports that during his years at university, a major personal influence was Dietrich Bonhoeffer's book, "The Cost of Discipleship."

== Career ==
Before beginning his association with YWAM, Brennt started a church in Tacoma, Washington.

After ending his career as a businessman and deciding to dedicate himself full time to evangelism, Brennt went to Reinhard Bonnke's School of Evangelism. There, Bonnke himself reportedly told him that the salary he received as a church minister prevented him from pursuing a career as a missionary.

After that conversation, he decided to go to Kona, Hawaii, where one of YWAM's main campuses is located. Brennt would continue to work with the organization in subsequent years, through Circuit Riders in Huntington Beach, California.

== The prophecy ==
On an undisclosed day in 2004, Christy Brennt reportedly received a prophecy in which waves crashed against nations, which was interpreted as a need for people to know Jesus. Brian Brennt would have written down his wife's words and then saved them in a file on his computer.

Brennt says he remembered the prophecy when Donald Trump was banned from Twitter, in December 2020, as it spoke of "censorship", something very specific.

As said by Christy Brennt,

There's a wave of pandemic coming for America and the nations. There's a wave of homelessness. There's a wave of economic difficulty. There's a wave of social unrest, and then there's going to be a protest.

There's going to be an uprising that's going to come into the Capitol building, and then the American flag is going to be bent down for a period of time. Then it will come back again.

And the president is going to be silenced.

Brennt, who stated that he had not informed anyone else about the content of the prophecy, declared himself appalled by his wife's predictions, and that he had told God that he did not wish to be the bearer of such bad news, to which God had responded: "You don't need to. Let it happen, and when it happens, then declare the word."

Only in January 2021, with Lou Engle and Andy Byrd by his side, Brennt publicly read the words during an online prayer conference, along with Daniel Kolenda, Michael Koulianos and Todd White, who prayed for the viewers in Europe, Africa, Latin America and United States. According to Engle, who found the prophetic vision "stunning", "I have this sense that over the past year God has been shaking everything that can be shaken before the greatest harvest."

In January 2021, Brennt, Engle and Byrd believed harvest time had arrived.

== Selected publications ==
- Salvation Encounter (with Christy Brennt)
- Big 10 (with Christy Brennt)
- Freedom Manual (with Mike Riches)
- Culture Shift (with Christy Brennt)
- Jesus Encounter (with Andy Byrd and Holly Mosemann)
