= Michael Koulianos =

American pastor, author and YouTuber

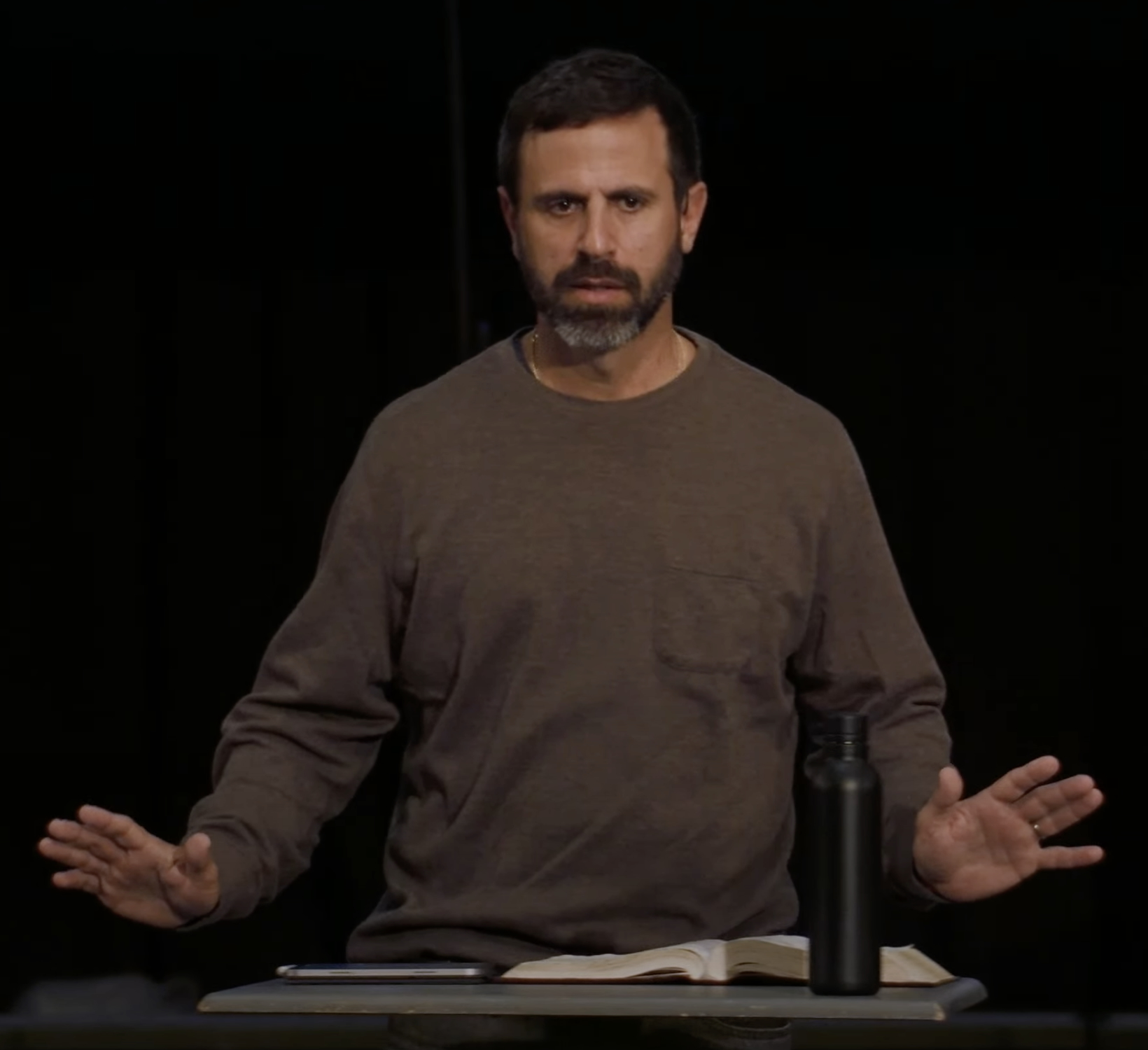
- Born: September 16, 1977 (age 48); Tarpon Springs, Florida, U.S.
- Occupations: Pastor, author, YouTuber
- Known for: Founder of Jesus Image
- Spouse: Jessica Koulianos
- Children: Theo
- Website: michaelkoulianos.org/about/

Michael Koulianos (born on September 16, 1977) is an American pastor, author and YouTuber, founder of Jesus Image and cofounder of "The Send" movement.

He currently lives in Orlando, with his wife, Jessica, and three children.

== Early life ==
Koulianos was born in Tarpon Springs, Florida. He was raised Greek Orthodox and converted to Protestantism at the age of 12. He began to preach regularly at the age of 16.

In 2004 he married his wife Jessica, and in 2005, he was ordained lead pastor of the World Healing Center Church in Orange County, California.

In 2007, he reportedly received a divine revelation and began to preach about the love of Jesus to as many people as possible. This led to the foundation of his Jesus Image organization, and later the Jesus Image Church and Jesus School in Orlando, Florida.

== Third Great Awakening ==
On March 29, 2016, Michael Koulianos talked to Lou Engle about a dream he had the night before, where he was approached by John Paul Jackson who told him that the Third Great Awakening was beginning in America, precisely at the "Azusa Now" gathering. The "Azusa Now" was a great prayer rally that took part at the Los Angeles Memorial Coliseum on April 9, 2016, and gathered more than 60,000 people.

This gathering led to another large meeting called "The Send", on February 23, 2019, at the Camping World Stadium, in Orlando, Florida. The organization was carried out by Koulianos, Andy Byrd, Brian Brennt, Daniel Kolenda, Teo Hayashi, Todd White and Lou Engle. As stated at the event webpage,

(...)it was clear this was not an event but a movement. A generation was ready to move from inspiration to action.

From this date on, "The Send" reached many countries like Brazil and Norway, with tens of thousands of people participating in the meetings.

== Participation in The Send Brazil ==
Koulianos was in Brazil in February 2020, as one of the guest preachers at the meeting The Send, which included Teo Hayashi among its organizers and was held simultaneously in Brasília and São Paulo. Before the event, Koulianos stated:

What the Lord is doing in Brazil is absolutely breathtaking. What He is doing at this time in history is unprecedented. What an honor to see Him move and sweep the nations. Thank you Jesus. This is the Jesus movement. It's here now. Saturday will be recorded in history. May we be faithful with His trust.

== Publications ==
- The Jesus Book
- Holy Spirit: the One Who Makes Jesus Real
- Jesus 365: a Daily Devotional with the Son of God
