= Meshoe =

Meshoe is a surname. Notable people with the surname include:

- Kenneth Meshoe (born 1954), South African evangelist, politician, reverend and teacher
- Olga Meshoe Washington (1981–2025), South African attorney and pro-Israel activist, daughter of Kenneth
