= Daniel Kolenda =

American missionary

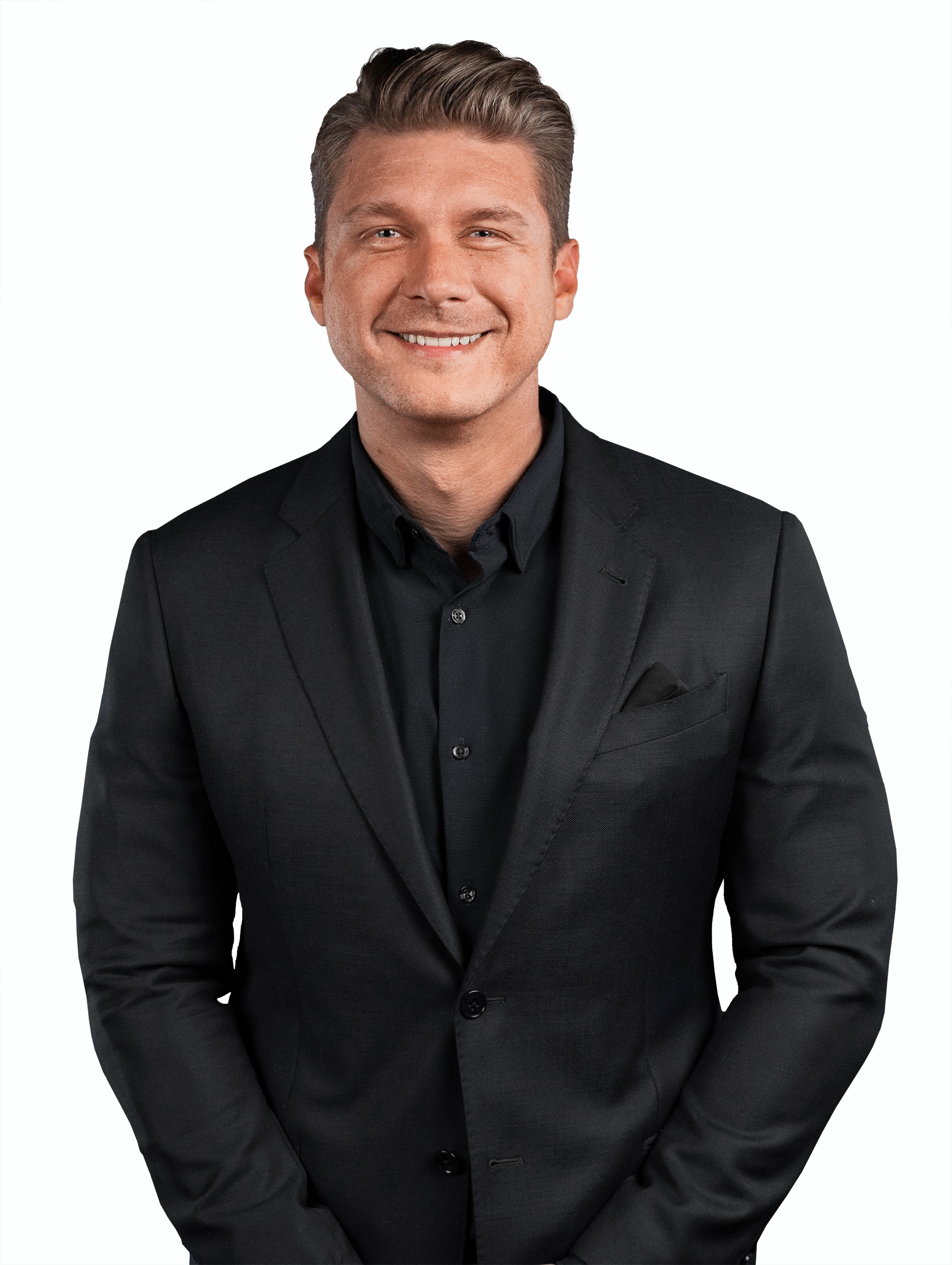
- Education: Southeastern University (Lakeland, Florida), Brownsville Revival School of Ministry (Pensacola, Florida)
- Occupations: Missionary, evangelist, author, and pastor
- Employer: Christ for all Nations (CfaN)
- Known for: President/CEO of Christ for all Nations, massive evangelistic campaigns
- Title: President and CEO of CfaN, Lead Pastor at Nations Church
- Website: danielkolenda.com

Daniel Kolenda is an American missionary, evangelist, author, and pastor, currently serving as the president and CEO of Christ for all Nations (CfaN) and the lead pastor at Nations Church in Orlando, Florida. He succeeded Reinhard Bonnke as head of CfAN in 2009 and worked side by side with Bonnke until his death in 2019.

== Biography ==
Kolenda is a fifth-generation preacher who attended the Brownsville Revival School of Ministry in Pensacola, and later graduated from the Southeastern University in Lakeland, Florida. He has led tens of millions of people to Christ through massive open-air evangelistic campaigns in some of the most difficult and remote locations on Earth.

== Career ==
Kolenda's work includes hosting two internationally syndicated television programs and authoring eight books, with bestsellers such as LIVE Before You Die and Slaying Dragons. He founded the CfaN Evangelism Bootcamp, aiming to "multiply labourers for the sake of the harvest," leading to the launch of hundreds of ministers and ministries.

== Trump, 2019 and Beyond ==
On July 6, 2019, Kolenda interviewed the prophet Jeremiah Johnson on his Christ for All Nations Facebook channel. Johnson, author of the book Trump, 2019 and Beyond, reported that he had received a vision in which Donald Trump emerged as the biblical Nebuchadnezzar, and that the church should play the role of Daniel, supporting the leader chosen by God for a new global stage of spiritual revival. During the interview, Kolenda tried to present himself impartially, denying that he was a Trump enthusiast, and that the prophecy should be understood from a spiritual point of view.

== The Send Brazil ==
In February 2020, Kolenda, with other The Send cofounders (Lou Engle, Michael Koulianos, Todd White, Brian Brennt, Teo Hayashi and Andy Byrd), was in Brazil for the first edition of The Send outside the United States. The president of Brazil, Jair Bolsonaro, made a surprise appearance and declared at the stage that he "is a believer in Jesus and that Brazil belongs to God."

About the event, Kolenda posted in his Facebook page:

God is raising up this generation to go out and be His hands and feet to spread the Gospel. The average age at all 3 stadiums was 24! #TheSend Brazil was a historical day for this country!

== COVID-19 pandemic ==
Speaking in relation to the COVID-19 pandemic, in a YouTube live on May 29, 2020 ("COVID-19 Prophetic Panel with Daniel Kolenda"), Kolenda urged his viewers not to put "their eggs in one basket", whether these were self, government or doctors. That all these baskets had holes, and that the only basket with no holes was God's. A few days earlier, on May 11, 2020, he had declared on the Christ for all Nations UK Facebook page that no sickness or disease could stand in the presence of God and called on his readers to be "a light in the darkness" and not "cower in fear like those in the world whose only hope is in science, medicine, politics and economics."

== Selected publications ==
- Live Before You Die: Wake Up to God's Will for Your Life (2012)
- The Judgment Seat of Christ (2016)
- Unlocking the Miraculous: Through Faith and Prayer (2016)
- Freedom from Debt. Biblical Keys to Financial Abundance (2017)
- Slaying Dragons: A Practical Guide to Spiritual Warfare (2019)
- Conquering Fear: A 60-Day Devotional (2020)
