= Kenneth Meshoe =

South African politician

Kenneth Meshoe MP
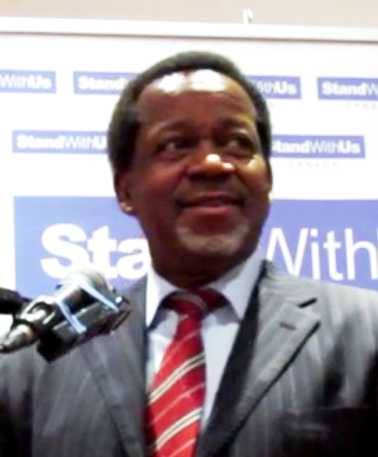
- Kenneth Meshoe in 2013

Leader of the African Christian Democratic Party
- Incumbent
- Assumed office 9 December 1993
- Preceded by: Position established

Member of the National Assembly of South Africa
- Incumbent
- Assumed office 9 May 1994

Personal details
- Born: Kenneth Rasalabe Joseph Meshoe; 18 January 1954 (age 72) Pretoria, South Africa
- Party: African Christian Democratic Party
- Spouse: Lydia Meshoe (m. 1976; died 2023)
- Children: 3 including Olga Meshoe Washington
- Education: University of the North
- Occupation: Member of Parliament
- Profession: Politician
- Committees: Portfolio Committee on International Relations and Cooperation

Kenneth Rasalabe Joseph Meshoe (born 18 January 1954) is a South African evangelist, politician, reverend and teacher. He has been serving as the inaugural leader of the African Christian Democratic Party, a Christian democratic political party, since 1993. He became a Member of Parliament in 1994 and has since been re-elected five times. He is one of the longest-serving MPs.

== Early life, education and career ==
Meshoe was born on 18 January 1954 in Pretoria, South Africa. He matriculated from high school in 1972 and went on to study at the University of the North where he obtained a Secondary Teachers Diploma in 1975. He then proceeded to work as a teacher for the next few years.

He and his wife, Lydia, joined the Christ for all Nations in 1976. In February 1980, he found employment as one of Reinhard Bonnke's associate evangelists. He completed his second-year Theological Diploma at the Shekinah Bible Institute in Kingsport in the US state of Tennessee in 1987.

He established his church, the Hope of Glory Tabernacle, in 1988, when he returned to South Africa. In 1994, the Bethel Christian College of Riverside, California, awarded him an Honorary Doctorate (Doctor of Humane Letters). He was also appointed to serve as an Associate Member on the Board of Regents of Bethel College.

== Political career ==
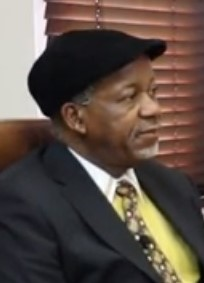
Meshoe in 2019

Meshoe established the ACDP in December 1993. The party competed in the 1994 general elections and won two seats in the newly established National Assembly. Meshoe filled one of the seats.

The party's support peaked in the 2004 general election when it won seven parliamentary seats and representation in six provincial legislatures. Meshoe was consequently re-elected as an MP. After the 2004 election, the ACDP started to decline in each election. The party managed to arrest the decline in the 2019 general election. Meshoe is currently serving his sixth term as an MP. He is a member of the Portfolio Committee on International Relations and Cooperation.

=== Political positions ===
Meshoe voted against the adoption of the final version of the South African constitution in 1996. He also opposes abortion. He voted against the legalisation of same-sex marriage in South Africa.

Meshoe has voiced support for the previous DA mayor of Nelson Mandela Bay Metropolitan Municipality, Athol Trollip. He has also spoken out on the issue of farm murders.

Meshoe has voiced support for the State of Israel, arguing against claims that Israel is an apartheid state, calling such accusations "slanderous" and "deceptive". According to Meshoe, these claims trivialise the word apartheid, and belittle the magnitude of the racism and suffering endured by non-white South Africans during the apartheid era.

== Personal life ==
Meshoe married Lydia Meshoe in 1976, with whom he went on to have three children, including Olga Meshoe Washington. Meshoe and Lydia renewed their vows in 2016. Lydia had previously served as a representative of the ACDP in the Gauteng Provincial Legislature. On 25 January 2023, the ACDP announced that Lydia had died. Reverend Meshoe remarried Wonkie Ncoco, a former ANC MP in 2024. In January 2025, Meshoe suffered another loss when his daughter Olga Meshoe Washington died from lupus.

Meshoe underwent a COVID-19 test on 22 March 2020 after he participated in a religious gathering in the Free State with five infected international guests. The ACDP deputy leader Wayne Thring announced on 27 March that Meshoe and fellow ACDP MP Steven Swart had tested positive for the virus. Meshoe did not show any symptoms, while Swart experienced flu-like symptoms. They were the first South African MPs to test positive for the virus.

Party political offices
Preceded by Position established	Leader of the African Christian Democratic Party; 1993–present	Incumbent
