= Brynamman =

Village in Carmarthenshire, Wales

Coordinates: 51.81512°N 3.87136°W

Brynamman: Welsh: Brynaman
- Location within Carmarthenshire
- Population: 2,608
- Community: Quarter Bach; Gwaun-Cae-Gurwen
- Principal area: Carmarthenshire; Neath Port Talbot
- Preserved county: Dyfed; West Glamorgan
- Country: Wales
- Sovereign state: United Kingdom
- Post town: AMMANFORD
- Postcode district: SA18
- Dialling code: 01269
- Police: Dyfed-Powys
- Fire: Mid and West Wales
- Ambulance: Welsh
- UK Parliament: Caerfyrddin; Brecon, Radnor and Cwm Tawe
- Senedd Cymru – Welsh Parliament: Carmarthen East and Dinefwr; Neath

Brynamman (Welsh: Brynaman) is a village on the south side of the Black Mountain (Y Mynydd Du), part of the Brecon Beacons National Park (Parc Cenedlaethol Bannau Brycheiniog). The village is split into Upper Brynamman and Lower Brynamman by the River Amman, which is also the boundary between the counties of Carmarthenshire and Neath Port Talbot (in the old county of Glamorganshire). Ruins of stone dwellings (possibly prehistoric), an early type of lime kiln and rectangular medieval buildings found on the mountain show that people have lived in this area for a long time. The population of Brynamman was 2,608 as of 2011; the urban area including Gwaun-Cae-Gurwen was 5,692.

Brynamman was previously known as Y Gwter Fawr (Welsh: "The Big Gutter"); The name was changed when the railway from Ammanford reached the village. George Borrow describes aspects of Gwter Fawr in the mid-19th century in his book Wild Wales published 1862. The current name is derived from "Brynamman House", the home of John Jones, builder of the railway.

Brynamman Golf Club (now defunct) first appeared in the mid-1920s. It continued into the 1930s. A feasibility study is being conducted into the reopening of Brynamman Lido, which opened in 1934 and closed in 2010.

== Ynys Dawela ==
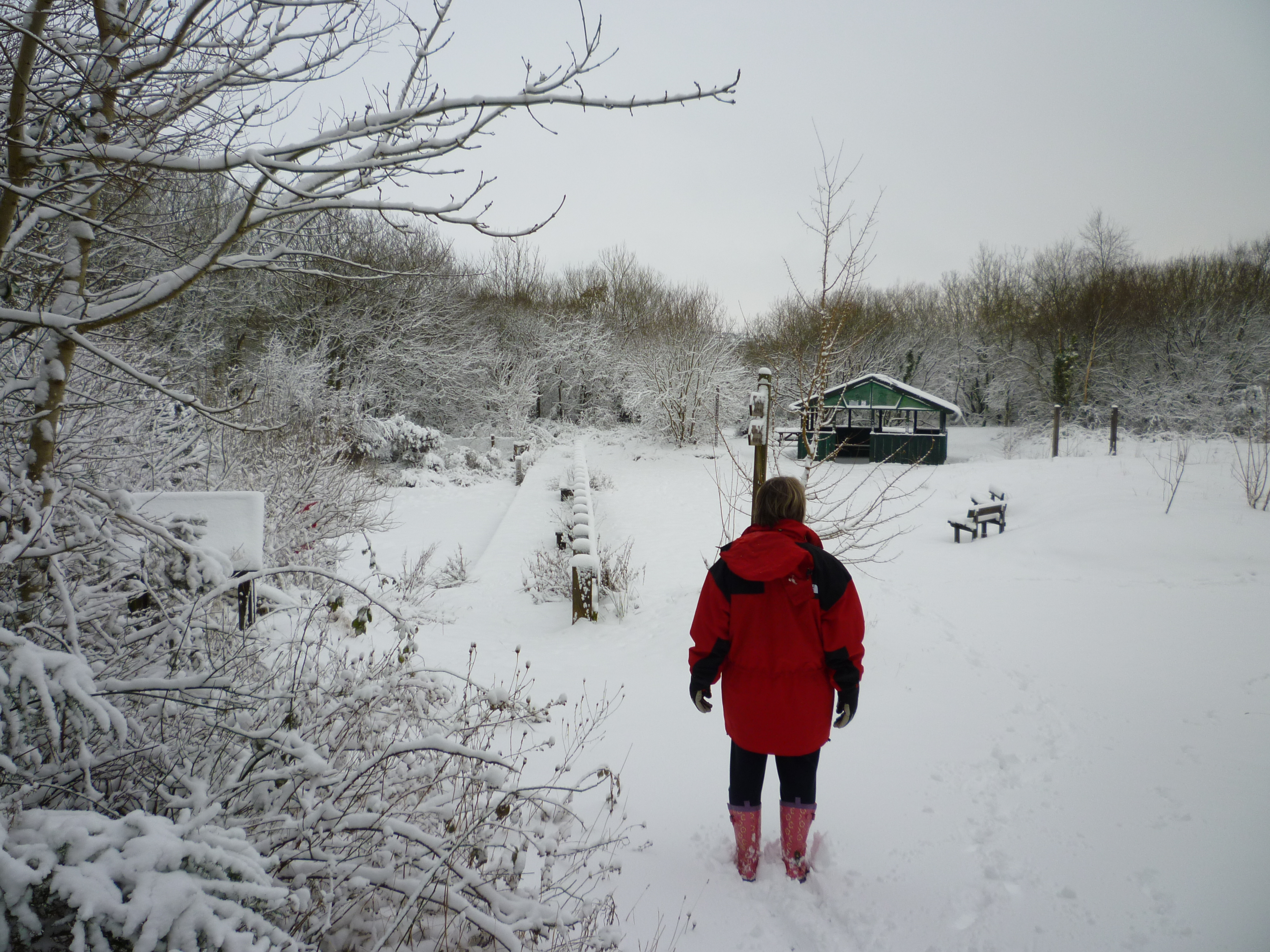
Ynys Dawela Nature Park in the snow (January 2010)

Ynys Dawela Nature Park is situated to the west of Brynamman, in the upper reaches of the Amman Valley. Its northern boundary is the Brecon Beacons National Park, and the river Amman, fringed with ancient oak woodland, forms its southern boundary. The park covers an area of 39 acres (15.8 hectares) and was once a working farm. The meadows dating from this period now support some scarce flowers, such as the Whorled Caraway and Meadow Thistle, and other wildlife, such as the marsh fritillary butterfly and dormice.

The park has a range of important habitats supporting a diverse assemblage of plant and animal life. The wet grasslands, marshy ground and ponds are particularly important to amphibians, like newts, frogs and toads. The site narrowly escaped opencast mining, before Dinefwr Borough Council secured its future by purchasing it from British Coal. Since then the park has been developed for recreational and educational use. The park is managed by Carmarthenshire County Council and supported by volunteers.

== Tregib Arms ==
The Tregib Arms in Brynamman was built c.1860. The first-ever union branch to look after the needs of Welsh anthracite miners was started in the public bar in 1891. The original certificate can be viewed in the lounge bar.

During the 1930s Welsh middleweight boxing champion Tommy Davies was a regular customer; his photo can be seen in the main bar.

== Notable people ==
- Rees Howells (1879–1950), founder of The Bible College of Wales.
- Richard Roberts (1884–1970), Anglican clergyman, Archdeacon of St Asaph
- Jack Elwyn Evans (1897–1941), rugby union and professional rugby league footballer
- Ieuan Williams (1909–1964), cricketer, right-handed batsman and wicket-keeper
- Delme Bryn-Jones (1934–2001), né Delme Jones; baritone singer
- Roy Noble OBE (born 1942), writer and radio and TV broadcaster
- Huw Ceredig (1942–2011), actor
- Dafydd Iwan (born 1943), singer and politician, president of Plaid Cymru
- Alun Ffred Jones (born 1949), politician, former TV producer, writer and director
- Jac Morgan (born 2000), professional rugby union player

== Gallery ==
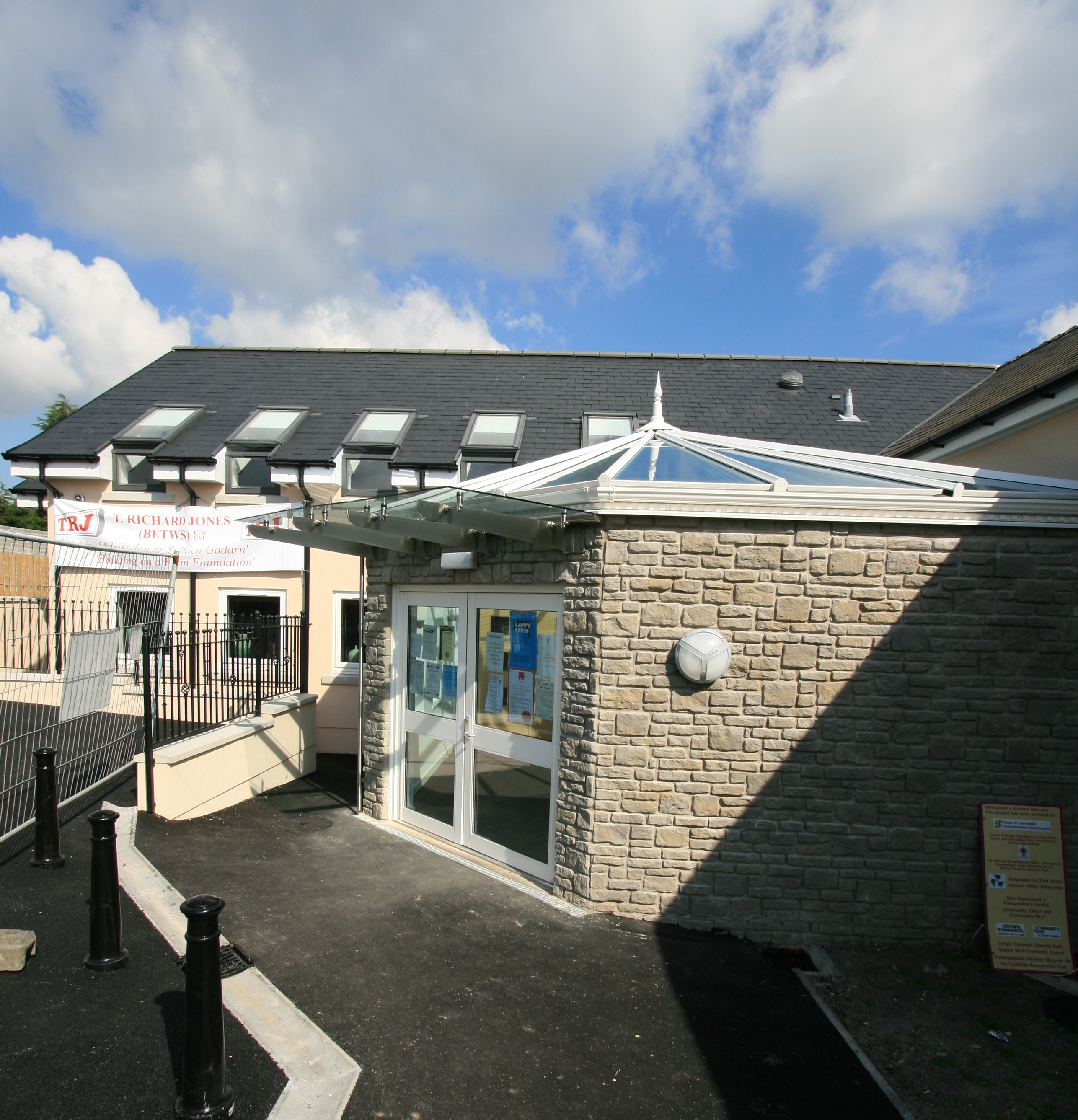
Black Mountain Centre in Brynamman

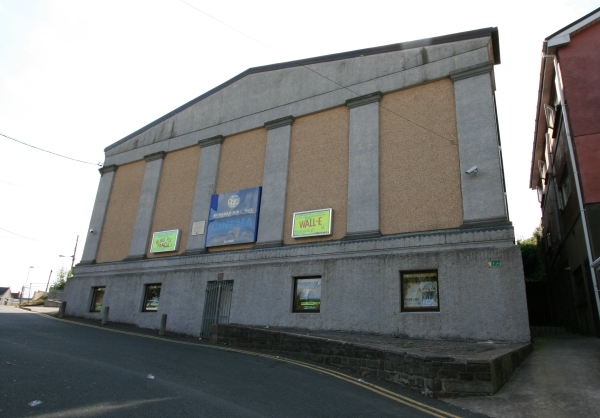
Brynamman Public Hall and Cinema (2008)

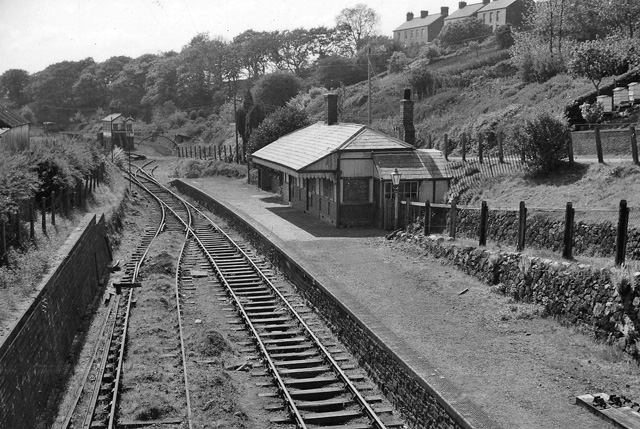
Brynamman GWR railway station (1962)

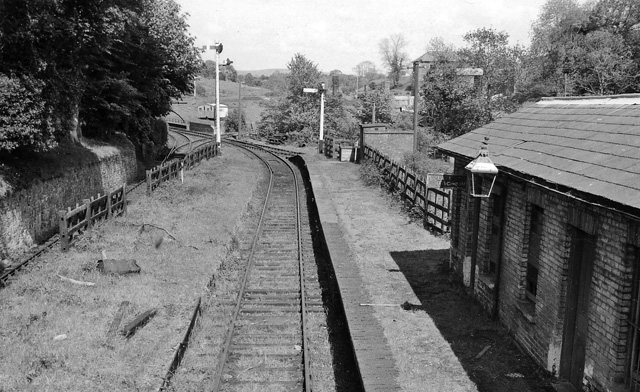
Brynamman LMS railway station (1962)

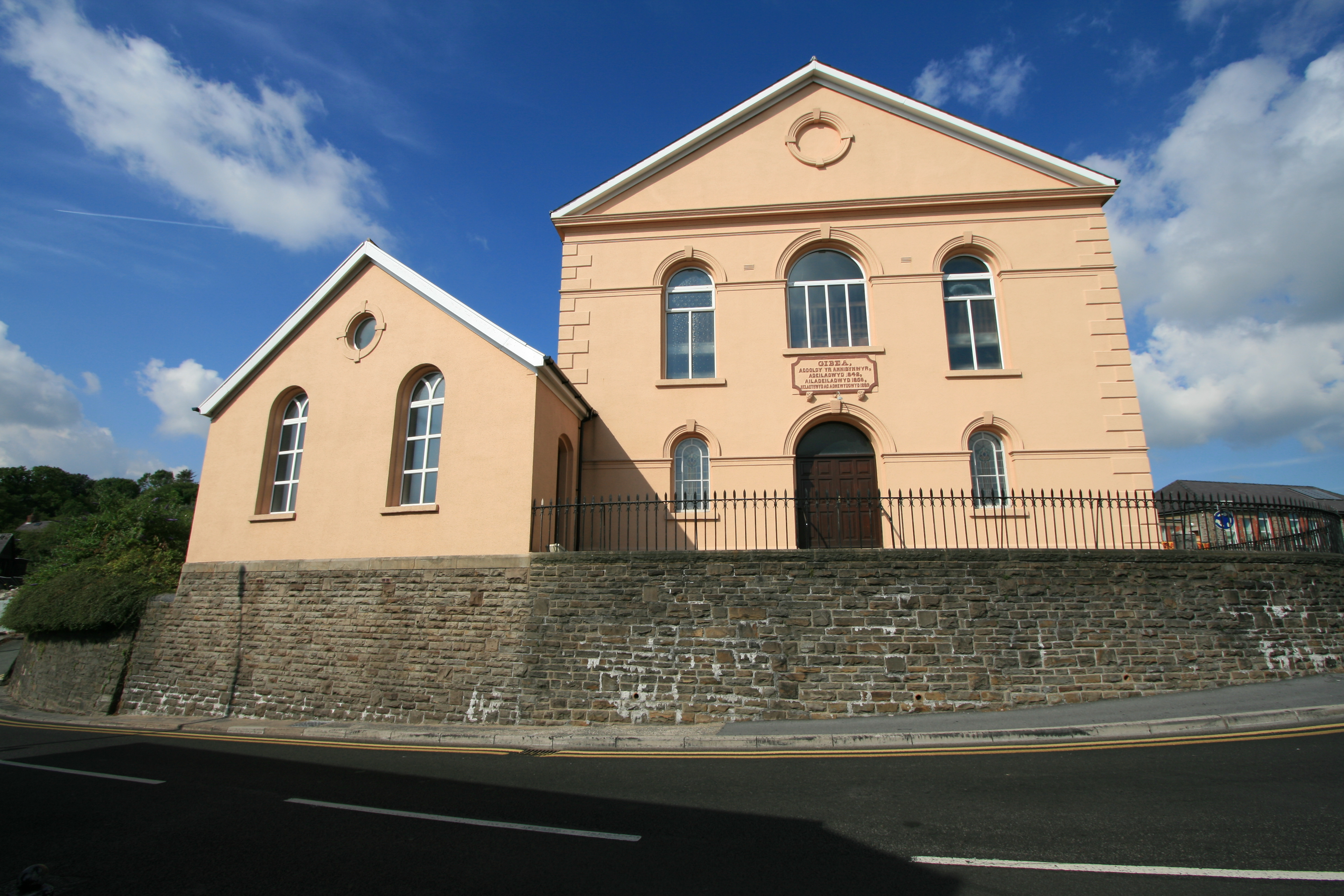
Gibea Chapel (2008)
