= Cornerstone Community Church =

Church based in Singapore

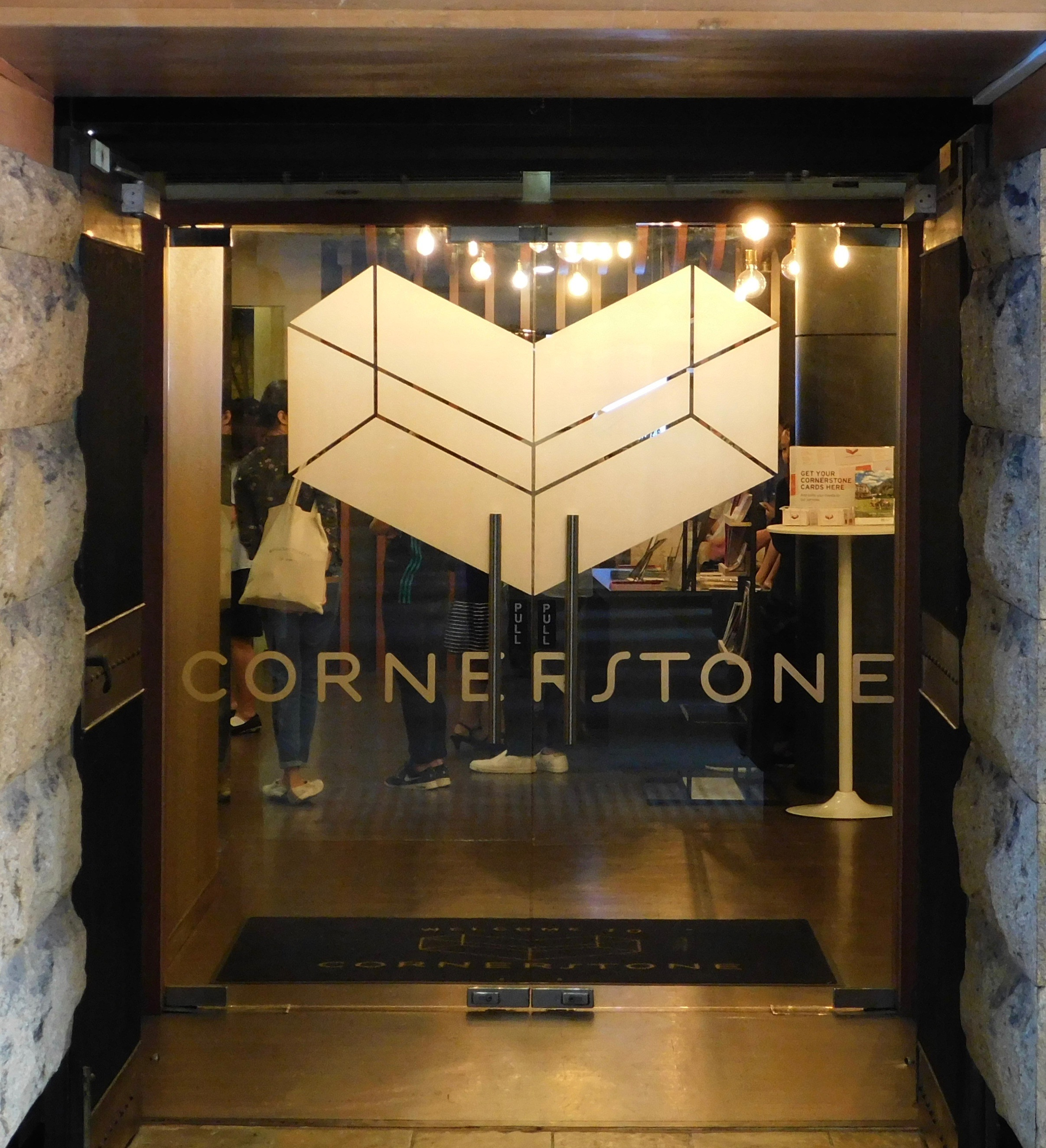
- Side entrance to church from Level 3 car park.
- Cornerstone Community Church
- 1.304457°N 103.90200°E
- Location: 11 East Coast Road, The Odean-Katong, #03-01/02, Singapore 428722
- Country: Singapore
- Denomination: Independent
- Churchmanship: Charismatic
- Website: www.cscc.org.sg

History
- Former name: Bedok Christian Centre
- Status: Church
- Founded: 1990

Cornerstone Community Church (Abbreviation: CSCC) (Chinese: 房角石教会) is an independent, Charismatic church based in Singapore. It is committed to global missions and has affiliate congregations in Kenya, Uganda, Myanmar, Pakistan, Indonesia, Australia and the Philippines. Established in 1990, the church is led by founder and senior pastor Rev. Yang Tuck Yoong.

In 2025, Cornerstone Community Church acquired two adjacent freehold units on the fourth floor of Orchard Towers for S$54.5 million. The church intends to relocate its Sunday services held at Golden Village Bugis+ to the renovated 19,289 square-foot space Orchard Towers premises, which is expected to include a 550-seater auditorium.

== History ==
Cornerstone Community Church, previously known as Bedok Christian Centre, was established in 1990 under the umbrella of the Anglican Church in Singapore. On 1 January 1994, it was renamed Cornerstone Community Church to better reflect the growing diversity of the congregation. On 2 June 1995, CSCC became an independent Charismatic church to further facilitate the spiritual calling of the parishioners. In mid-2000, the church became officially affiliated with Zion Ministerial Fellowship Inc., a ministerial fellowship based in Waverly, New York, United States.

Over the years, Cornerstone Community Church has grown to more than 5,000 members comprising ten congregations of various nationalities and languages. This includes Generations, their youth service. In 2012, CSCC helped to revitalise Bible College of Wales and the Pisgah Chapel in Swansea, Wales, an institution that intercessor, Rees Howells established in 1927.

== Cell groups ==
Cornerstone Community Church organises members into small groups known as cell groups. These groups function as the church's primary structure for community interaction. They provide regular meetings for fellowship, mutual support, and discussion of religious teaching. Cell groups also serve as a setting in which participants can take on responsibilities within the church and develop skills relevant to congregational activities.

== Missions ==
Cornerstone Community Church believes it has been called by God to be a house of prayer and to fulfil the Great Commission. Since its inception, the church has dispatched many teams overseas to proclaim the gospel. Today, CSCC has church plants in almost a dozen countries.

== Controversies ==
=== Comments on homosexuality ===
Rev. Yang was in the news after an article entitled "Gay Backlash" was published in The Straits Times on 23 July 2003.

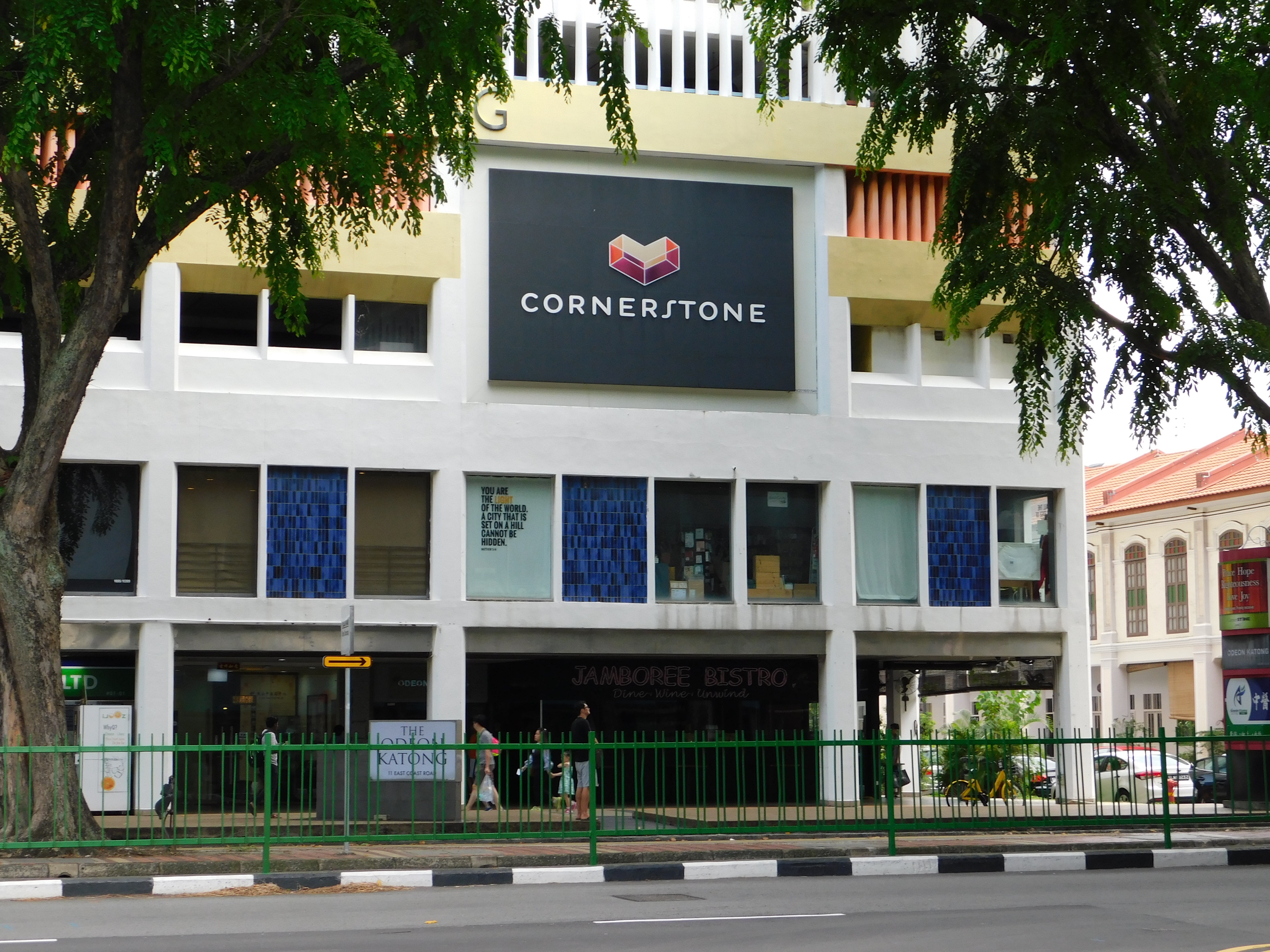
Church's signage across East Coast Road.

The article summarised the different views of Christian organisations in Singapore regarding the remarks made by then-Singaporean Prime Minister Goh Chok Tong, in which he announced the government's openness to the employment of homosexuals, despite homosexual acts still being illegal in Singapore. The article reported that Rev. Yang, together with a group of Christians, voluntary organisations and professions, met to discuss a strategy and plan of action for Christians to tackle what they termed as a "volatile situation."

In September 2003, Rev. Yang issued a statement to Time magazine whereby he accused the American publication of glamourizing an illegal and condemned lifestyle in an article which reviewed the gay scene in Singapore. He added that the people of Singapore have spoken up against the subject. No attestation, however, was provided by Rev. Yang with regard to this claim.

On 24 February 2008, Rev. Yang gave a sermon entitled "The Sin of Sodom" in which he called homosexuality an abomination. He argued that homosexuality is a spirit that is yet to prevail in Singapore because of official legislation, public opinion and conscience. He persuaded churches to stand up and oppose this "spirit," before Singapore is sent to the abyss in the same manner as Sodom. He also encouraged churches to be "bold" and "courageous," and to "take a stand." He lamented that a church that has lost the ability to influence and lobby society would be useless.

=== Anti-Muslim remarks by American preacher Lou Engle ===
In March 2018, remarks by fundamentalist American preacher Lou Engle that were made at a three-day conference organised by Cornerstone created an uproar. Engle had addressed thousands attending the conference, saying, “The Muslims are taking over the south of Spain. But I had a dream, where I will raise up the church all over Spain to push back a new modern Muslim movement.”

The church filed a police report against Rice Media, the online news startup that first reported the remarks. The church said the article was a “scurrilous attack” and that it had a “seditious tendency”. It also said the article contained serious allegations "that seek to, and has the effect of, stirring up religious tensions and promoting feelings of ill-will and hostility between Christians and Muslims".

Senior pastor Yang Tuck Yoong later said Engle's remarks were "never meant to be an indictment against Muslims or the Muslim community in Spain as a whole. Instead, he was referring to the radical Islamic insurgency, including ISIS (Islamic State in Iraq and Syria) advances into that nation with intentions of pressing its brand of militant ideology. He expressed his apologies that the choice of words used might have caused unnecessary misunderstandings, as it had not been in his intention to do so." Engle did not comply with a request by the police department to return to Singapore to cooperate with investigations.

Yang later met with the Mufti of Singapore and other Muslim community leaders to offer an apology. He said the church was unaware of Engle's controversial past and informed him that he would not be able to speak in Singapore in future.

At an interfaith visit with a mosque months later, Yang said the church had tightened protocols and procedures to ensure "something like this never happens again".

== See also ==
- Megachurch
- Bible College of Wales
- Christianity in Singapore

== News articles ==
- "Controversy over church's "prosperity gospel"". The Straits Times (online). 11 November 2015.
- "Church council's position on homosexuality "has not changed"". The Straits Times (online). 25 December 2017.
