= Olga Meshoe Washington =

South African attorney (1981–2025)

- Born: September 14, 1981; South Africa
- Died: January 6, 2025 (aged 43)
- Education: University of Pretoria
- Known for: Israel advocacy, interfaith relations
- Spouse: Joshua Washington
- Parent: Kenneth Meshoe

Olga Meshoe Washington (14 September 1981 – 6 January 2025) was a South African attorney known for her work in interfaith relations and Israel advocacy. Olga was also a Board Member and Senior staff member of IBSI, overseeing their Speakers Bureau.

== Early life and education ==
Meshoe Washington was the eldest daughter of South African politician Reverend Kenneth Meshoe, parliamentary leader of the African Christian Democratic Party. She earned her law degree from the University of Pretoria.

== Career ==
Meshoe Washington founded and directed the pro-Israel Christian lobby group DEISI (Defend, Embrace, Invest, Support Israel). She rebutted accusations of Israeli apartheid, commenting that Israeli policies were so different from South African apartheid that such comparisons were "woefully ignorant" and "trivialize what Black South Africans went through; they're erasing our experience". In 2022, she spoke at a Geneva event organized by UN Watch associated with the United Nations Human Rights Council's Pillay report. Her remarks were supported by Yair Lapid's statement denouncing the Pillay report as antisemitic. She was named one of 25 young visionaries by The Jerusalem Post, which noted how she applied her legal and corporate management expertise to impact socioeconomic development programs, non-profits, and NGOs. She served as chief operating officer of Club Z, a US Zionist youth movement. She was featured in Ari Mittleman's Paths of the Righteous: Stories of Heroism, Humanity and Hope ISBN 978-965702373-0.

== Personal life and death ==
Her husband, Joshua Washington, is the son of Dumisani Washington, the founder and CEO of the Institute for Black Solidarity with Israel (IBSI). At their wedding, tables were divided to provide kosher offerings (chopped herring and mock crayfish), or non kosher menu items (cow stomach, tripe, offal, samp and “runaway feet”).

Meshoe Washington died on 6 January 2025, a month after being diagnosed with lupus. She was 43, and survived by her husband and two sons.
