= Yang Tuck Yoong =

Singaporean pastor

- 杨德云

Personal life
- Born: Singapore

Religious life
- Religion: Non-denominational Christianity; Charismatic Christianity
- Church: Cornerstone Community Church

Yang Tuck Yoong (simplified Chinese: 杨德云; traditional Chinese: 楊德雲; pinyin: Yáng Déyún) is a Singaporean pastor associated with the charismatic movement. He is the founder of Cornerstone Community Church.

== Early life and education ==
Yang attended Catholic Junior College and was a member of its football team.

== Career ==
Yang founded Cornerstone Community Church in 1995. In April 2018, he publicly apologised to the Muslim community in Singapore, following reports that Lou Engle—a guest speaker at the Kingdom Invasion Conference organised by Cornerstone—had called Christians to "raise up the church all over Spain to push back a new modern Muslim movement". Yang is the chairman of the Alliance of Pentecostal and Charismatic Churches of Singapore (APCCS).

== Personal views ==
In an August 1991 letter to The Straits Times, Yang opined that there was a "direct link between sex and violence on the screen and criminal behaviour."

In December 2017, following President Donald Trump's announcement that the American embassy in Israel would be relocated to Jerusalem, Yang referred to the city as the "indivisible capital of Israel and that is really non-negotiable", but added that he would "never advocate violence in any measure or form as the solution to the current situation in Israel."

In January 2013, Yang urged Christians in Singapore to "make known their views" that they did not want Section 377A of the Penal Code—a law that criminalised sex between men—to be repealed. He also wrote on Cornerstone's Website: "Be ready for a sharp polarising of our society over the gay and lesbian issue. And when that happens, you better make sure you know which side you are on." However, after the Attorney-General's Chambers cautioned members of the public not to make "comments on these matters that are sub judice", Yang remarked that "whatever (the Attorney-General's Chambers) says, we will follow to the letter."

The same year, in a sermon titled "The Sin of Sodom", Yang described homosexuality as an "abomination" that was "far more rampant, militant and organised than most of us actually believe it to be." He also urged his congregation to "rise up and take a stand". In 2021, Yang rebuked LGBT-affirming churches in Singapore and stressed that "a homosexual Christian is an oxymoron."

In August 2022, Prime Minister Lee Hsien Loong confirmed that Section 377A would be repealed; Yang called the decision "extremely regrettable" and predicted that it would have a "profound impact on the culture that our children and future generations of Singaporeans will live in."
