= Ieuan Williams =

Welsh cricketer

Ieuan Williams (17 March 1909 — 3 March 1964) was a Welsh cricketer. He was a right-handed batsman and wicket-keeper who played first-class cricket for Glamorgan. He was born in Brynamman and died in Eastbourne.

Williams, who had previously played with Brynamman Cricket Club, as well as Liverpool University, struggled with his entry into first-class cricket, as in the two matches he played, he scored just ten runs. Having exited his first-class career, he completed studies in dentistry.
