= Bible College of Wales, Sketty =

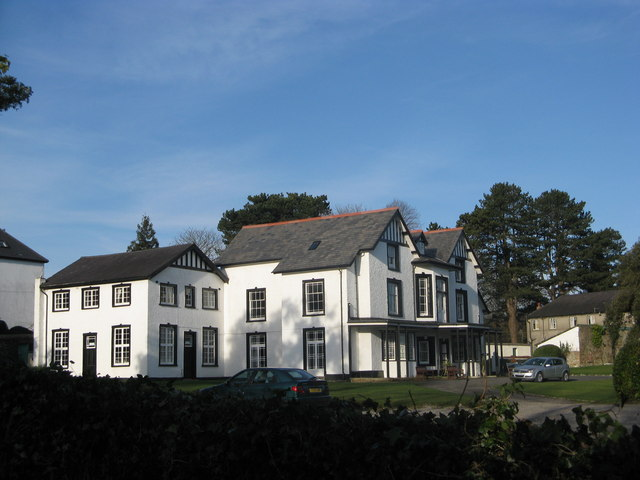
- Former names: Trinity School of Ministry
- Established: 1924; 102 years ago
- Founders: Rees Howells
- Website: www.bcwales.org

The Bible College of Wales (Trinity School of Ministry from 2009 to 2012), is a Pentecostal Bible college located along Derwen Fawr Road in Swansea, Wales. Originally based in Swansea, Wales, it was founded in 1924 by Rees Howells.

In 2009, it was relocated from Wales to England and renamed Trinity School of Ministry, run by Global Horizons. In 2012, Cornerstone Community Church, an independent Pentecostal congregation based in Singapore purchased and refurbished the property at Derwen Fawr. The college has since been reopened and runs a three-month School of Ministry programme twice a year.

The college's current director, is Pastor Yang Tuck Yoong.

== History ==
Prior to starting the Bible College of Wales, founder Rees Howells was part of a ministry in Africa from 1915 to 1920. He left this life behind him to focus on the founding of a training college that could equip the growing number of Christian converts to become missionaries and ministry workers. Inspired by the Moody Bible Institute in Chicago, Illinois, he started a Bible College in Swansea.

Despite having only two shillings when he purchased the first property for the Bible College of Wales, he eventually received gifts sufficient to make up for the shortfall. He went on to purchase four estates for the College Wales - Glynderwen, Derwen Fawr, Sketty Isaf, and Penllergaer. It formally opened at Glynderwen House, Swansea, UK in 1924.

Rees Howells was director of the college until his death in 1950. He was succeeded by his son Samuel Rees Howells who led the college until a year before his death in 2004. The college continued to run under Alan Scotland. In July 2009 the Bible College of Wales saw its last graduation. In September 2009, the college operations moved to Rugby under the name Trinity School of Ministry and was run by Global Horizons.

In December 2012, Cornerstone Community Church of Singapore purchased the Derwen Fawr site and announced intentions to establish a new Bible school on the site while retaining its original name and honouring its heritage and legacy. It was reopened and inaugurated on Whit Monday, 2015 under the new leadership.

== Accreditation ==
The BCW School of Ministry is accredited by the Accreditation Service for International Schools, Colleges & Universities to offer a diploma in ministry.

== Notable alumni ==
- Reinhard Bonnke

== Bibliography ==
- Samuel, Son and Successor of Rees Howells, by Richard Maton, ByFaith Media, 2012. Covers the story of how the Bible College of Wales was founded, and its full history.
- Samuel Rees Howells: A Life of Intercession, The Legacy of Prayer and Spiritual Warfare of an Intercessor by Richard Maton. Covering the prayers of the Bible College of Wales 1939-2002 and the move from Swansea, to Trinity School of Ministry.
- Rees Howells, Monument of Faith, History of The Bible College of Wales 1922-1932, by Mathew Backholer. Rees Howells was a man of extraordinary faith which propelled him to the forefront as the founder of The Bible College of Wales and a ministry that would touch the world.
