= Christ for all Nations =

Christian evangelistic organization

The Christ for all Nations (CfaN) is an evangelistic organization created in 1974 by German-American missionary Reinhard Bonnke and his wife, Anni, then serving in Maseru, Lesotho. From there, it spread to several other countries in Africa, having allegedly converted more than 90 million people to Christianity.

== History ==
In 1969, the Bonnkes began their evangelistic mission in the landlocked country of Lesotho, located in South Africa. After several years, in which their preaching was not very successful, Reinhard Bonnke began to feel very frustrated. However, as he reports, one day he had a dream in which the map of Africa was "washed in the precious blood of Jesus", and a voice, which he claimed was from the Holy Spirit, exclaimed: "Africa must be saved". Bonnke at first would not have taken much notice of the message, but after the dream repeated itself for four days in a row, he commented to his wife: "Anni, I think God is trying to tell me something."

From there, with the support of a small local church, Bonnke began his first crusade, but only 100 people attended this initial meeting. However, minutes after he began preaching, a man stood up in the congregation and shouted that he was healed, followed by several other attendants. The repercussion of this event brought an increasing influx of people to the next meetings, which began to fill stadiums. From then on, Bonnke began to wander from nation to nation in Africa, organizing large evangelistic crusades that became increasingly larger. CfaN then built a first mobile tent (the "Yellow Tent"), with the capacity to house ten thousand spectators; this, however, soon became small, and a larger structure, the "Big Tent", capable of receiving 30 thousand seated spectators was built; even so, it was not able to accommodate all the thousands who wanted to witness the preaching.

After its great success in Africa, CfaN expanded to Asia, holding crusades in the Philippines, Malaysia, Indonesia, Singapore and India. At a later stage, it reached Latin America, including Brazil, where the organization holds an evangelism school in Curitiba, Paraná.

=== Succession ===
In 2009, after having served for several years alongside Reinhard Bonnke, evangelist Daniel Kolenda was appointed by the founder of CfaN as president of the organization, and named as his successor. The transition was completed in 2019, following the death of Bonnke.

== Controversies ==
CfaN's preaching did not only attract supporters: in 1990, protests took place in the predominantly Muslim city of Kano, in northern Nigeria, where Bonnke had been authorized to hold one of his crusades. In the riots that followed, around eight people died, according to official data. The CfaN team had to be hurriedly removed from the crusade site by military personnel and taken to the airport in the capital, Lagos, where they left the country. After the incident, visas for CfaN to operate in Nigeria were denied for ten years. Relations with the Nigerian government only began to change favorably in 1999, with the coming to power of President Olusegun Obasanjo.

According to Professor Esther Mombo, from the Center for Christian-Muslim Relations in Eastleigh (CCMRE), Nairobi, Kenya, the impact of Bonnke's crusades and CfaN in Africa is complex, and may require researchers some time to correctly evaluate. As said Mombo, his preaching did not always foster peaceful coexistence between Christians and Muslims, but encouraged rivalry and hatred. Despite this, she concludes:

His healing ministries appeared to be strange, and to an extent a circus. Yet I am sure that through his ministry, some people met Christ and grew in faith.

=== IPIC scam ===
In 2003, CfaN was involved in a scam created by Gregory Setser, a self-declared "Christian investor" and founder of the International Product Investment Corp. (IPIC), which deceived several evangelical organizations by promising returns of 25% to 50% over periods of three to six months. The person responsible for introducing Setser into CfaN's top management, T. Thomas Henschke, was a former employee of the organization, arrested in the FBI operation that detained Setser and other associates. CfaN alleges that it was a victim of the scheme and that Setser attended only two board meetings, having made "and gave a substantial gift to the ministry", before his arrest.
