= Reinhard Bonnke =

German Pentecostal evangelist

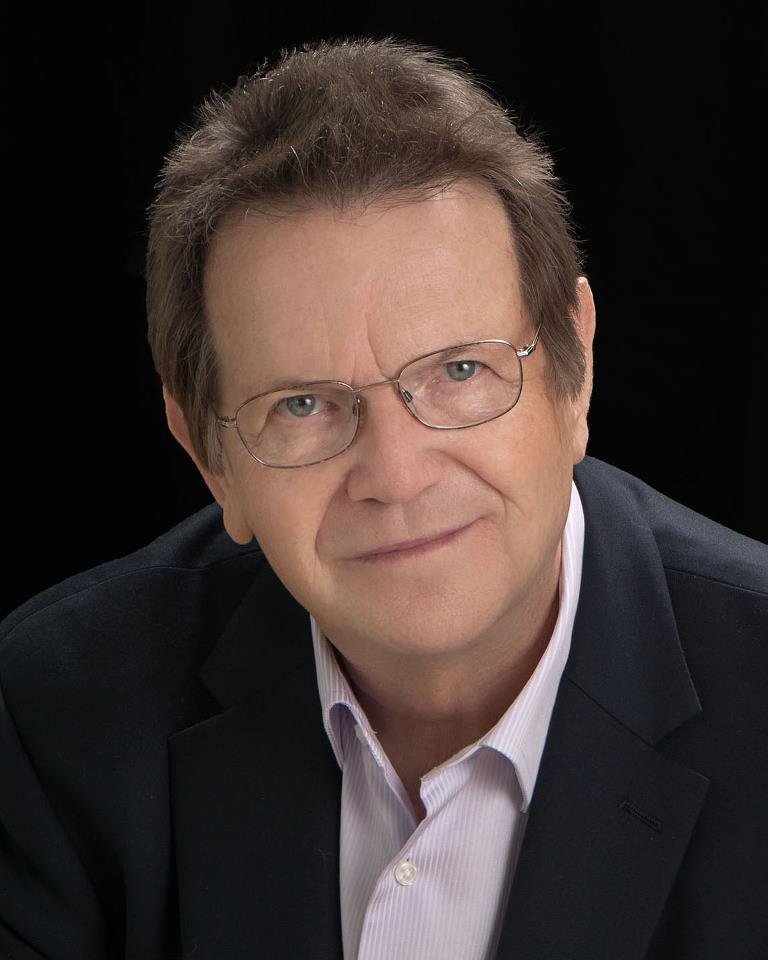
- Reinhard Bonnke
- Born: 19 April 1940; Königsberg, East Prussia, Germany
- Died: 7 December 2019 (aged 79); Orlando, Florida
- Resting place: Woodlawn Memorial Park, Gotha, Florida
- Occupation: Evangelist

Reinhard Bonnke (19 April 1940 - 7 December 2019) was a German-American Pentecostal evangelist, principally known for his gospel missions throughout Africa. Bonnke had been an evangelist and missionary in Africa since 1967. In Nigeria’s city, Lagos, in 2000, a single service is believed to have been attended by 1.6 million people. Christ for all Nations (CFAN), an organisation founded by Bonnke, claims he preached Christ to more than 79 million non believers.

== Early life ==
Reinhard Bonnke was born on 19 April 1940, in the city of Königsberg, East Prussia, Germany, the fifth son of Hermann Bonnke, an army logistics officer in the Reichswehr who fought on the Eastern Front; his paternal grandfather was August Bonnke, the owner of a windmill in Trunz, East Prussia (now Milejewo, Poland), who was healed of an unknown ailment by the evangelist Luis Graf in 1922, but died during the evacuation of East Prussia in 1945. His mother was Metaa Bonnke (née Scheffler). Bonnke had six siblings: Martin, Gerhard, Jurgen, Peter and Felicitas, his only younger sibling and his only sister.

With his mother and siblings, he was taken to Denmark during the evacuation of East Prussia and spent some years in a displaced persons centre before settling in Gluckstadt, West Germany. After his own war service, his father became a pastor in the village of Krempe. He became a born-again Christian at the age of nine after his mother spoke with him about a sin that he had committed. He sensed a call from God to serve as a missionary in Africa from the age of 10 and said that he had the experience of baptism in the Holy Spirit.

Bonnke studied at the Bible College of Wales in Swansea, Wales, UK, where he was inspired by the director, Samuel Rees Howells. In one meeting Howells spoke of answered prayer; after this meeting, Bonnke prayed, "Lord, I also want to be a man of faith. I want to see your way of providing for needs." Passing through London, he had a chance meeting with the preacher George Jeffreys. As he walked, he came across a house with a nameplate on the front that said “George Jeffreys”. He wondered if it could be the great George Jeffreys who had founded the Elim Pentecostal churches in Ireland and England. He prayed for the young student and imparted grace to him.

== African mission ==
His work in Africa began in 1967. He arrived in South Africa and almost immediately encountered the apartheid system, which he developed an antipathy towards, which in turn caused friction between him and the minister who oversaw him in South Africa. Bonnke subsequently accepted a position to oversee three churches in Lesotho, but began again from scratch after he discovered that unbiblical practices had emerged in the congregations he was to oversee.

In the first few years of his work, Bonnke encountered poor results from his evangelistic efforts and felt frustrated at the pace of his ministry. Then he had a recurring dream featuring a picture of the map of Africa being splattered with blood and heard the voice of God crying "Africa Shall Be Saved". This ultimately led him to adopt large-scale evangelism, rather than the traditional small-scale missionary approach. He rented a stadium in Gaborone, Botswana, and preached with little cooperation from local churches. The first meetings saw about 100 people attending, but this number grew swiftly.

In 1974, Bonnke founded the mission organisation Christ for all Nations (CfaN). Originally based in Johannesburg, South Africa, the headquarters were relocated to Frankfurt, Germany, in 1986. This was done primarily to distance the organisation from South Africa's apartheid policy at the time. Today CfaN has 9 offices across 5 continents.

Bonnke began his ministry holding tent meetings that accommodated large crowds. According to an account published by the Christian Broadcasting Network, in 1984 he commissioned the construction of what was claimed to be the world's largest mobile structure - a tent capable of seating 34,000; this was destroyed in a wind storm just before a major meeting and therefore the team decided to hold the event in the open air instead. According to this account, the event was subsequently attended by over 100,000 people which is far greater than the 34,000 seating capacity the tents could have contained. For various reasons, usually due to insufficient capacity, the 34,000-seat tent was only used once, in Harare, Zimbabwe, in 1986.

In addition to South Africa, Bonnke would also hold many campaigns in other African countries including Nigeria and Kenya and became known as "the Billy Graham of Africa." In the 5 February 2001 edition of Graham's Christianity Today, journalist Corrie Cutrer stated that Bonnke had set "record-breaking attendances" at recent events he held in Nigeria. Bonnke announced his "farewell gospel crusade" to be held in Lagos, Nigeria, in November 2017. Lagos is also the location of a gospel crusade held in 2000 which, according to CfaN, is the organization's largest to date, drawing an attendance of six million people in a 5-night crusade, and as much as 1.6 million attendance in one day. In 2009 Bonnke appointed his successor, Daniel Kolenda who continues to lead the ministry. In 2020, following Bonnke's death, Christ for all Nations launched the CfaN Evangelism Bootcamp. In 2022 Schools of Evangelism were started in South Africa, and Europe and Fire Camps were launched in dozens of nations on six continents. Today, more than 4,000 evangelists have been trained by Christ for all Nations and more than 91-million decisions for Christ have been counted. In 2024, in the 50th year of the ministry, CfaN is conducting 50 gospel crusades throughout the African continent.

== Persecution ==
=== Kano riots, subsequent expulsion from Nigeria, and return to the country ===
In 1991, during Bonnke's visit to Kano in Nigeria, there were riots in the city as Muslims protested over remarks he had reportedly made about Islam in the city of Kaduna on his way to Kano. A rumour was spread that Bonnke was planning to "lead an invasion" into Kano. Muslim youths gathered at the Kofar Mata Eide-ground where they were addressed by several clerics who claimed that Bonnke was going to blaspheme Islam. About 8,000 youths gathered at the Emir's palace and after noon prayers the riots ensued, during which many Christians sustained various injuries and several churches were burned. Official reports state that at least eight people were killed, although other research and reports place the number as being as much as 500 as many of the Christians who were killed were thrown into wells and the attacks were spread between multiple locations.

Despite the state governor absolving Bonnke of any blame for the incident, Bonnke's subsequent attempts to return to Nigeria were denied, as the Nigerian Embassy refused his visa applications. In 2000, a new civilian government in Nigeria was elected to power, and President Olusegun Obasanjo, a Christian, invited Reinhard Bonnke to return to the country. Bonnke returned to Nigeria and held a crusades in Benin City in the south. He would deny reports that the Northern Region of Nigeria's Council of Ulamas banned him from entering northern Nigeria.

Bonnke held many crusades in Nigeria after 2000, and conversion rates were significantly higher than in many other African nations, with one campaign achieving a conversion of 1.1 million people . Nigeria would be where his final international crusade would be held, in Lagos in 2017.

== Personal life ==
After graduating from the Bible College of Wales and returning to Germany, Bonnke led a series of meetings in Rendsburg. He began receiving speaking invitations from all around Germany and the rest of the world. Bonnke met Anni Suelze at a gospel music festival and admired the grace which she showed when a mistake led to her losing a music competition. He offered to preach at the church she attended and over time they fell in love. They married in 1964 and had three children: Kai-Uwe Friedrich, known as "Freddy", Gabrielle and Suzanne.

== Death ==
Bonnke died on 7 December 2019. The month before, he had announced on his official Facebook page that he had undergone femur surgery and needed time to "learn how to walk again". Nigerian President Muhammadu Buhari, who was Muslim, praised Bonnke for his frequent visits to Nigeria and described his death as a "great loss to Nigeria".

His appointed successor is the evangelist Daniel Kolenda.

He would be buried in Gotha, Florida's Woodlawn Memorial Park, with his memorial stone being shaped to resemble Africa.
