= African Christian Democratic Party =

Political party in South Africa

- Abbreviation: ACDP
- President: Kenneth Meshoe
- Founded: 9 December 1993
- Headquarters: Alberton, Gauteng
- Ideology: Christian right Social conservatism
- Political position: Centre-right to right-wing
- Religion: Christianity
- National affiliation: Multi-Party Charter (MPC)
- Continental affiliation: Democrat Union of Africa
- Colours: Red Turquoise
- National Assembly seats: 3 / 400
- Provincial Legislatures: 2 / 487
- Cape Town City Council: 6 / 231

Website
- www.acdp.org.za

The African Christian Democratic Party (ACDP) is a South African political party founded in 1993. It is a conservative Christian party based on Biblical principles. The leader of the party is Kenneth Meshoe.

Following the 2016 municipal elections, the ACDP joined with the much larger Democratic Alliance (DA) and several other smaller parties to form coalition governments in Nelson Mandela Bay, Johannesburg and Tshwane.

As of 2024, the ACDP has three members in the South African Parliament, and one member each in the provincial legislatures of Western Cape, and Gauteng. It also has 22 municipal councillors across the country.

In June 2024, ACDP was offered an opportunity to be part of Government of National Unity (GNU), but the party decided to stay out of the new government.

== Policy ==
The party's 2019 manifesto focused on seven social challenges, under the slogan "Unite - Build - Grow": employment, economic growth, education, health, safety & security, good governance and property rights & rural development.

The party seeks to apply Biblical principles "to build a better South Africa." Its platform is based on "the biblical standard of reconciliation, justice, compassion, tolerance, peace and the sanctity of life, the individual, the family and community."

It is anti-abortion and supports the death penalty for certain crimes.

The ACDP was the only party to vote against the adoption of the final version of the South African Constitution, for reason that it enshrined the right to elective abortion and the specific protection of sexual orientation.

Its 2000 manifesto opposed the promotion of condoms and safe sex as a way of preventing HIV transmission: "The ACDP feel strongly that the condom campaign must be abandoned and that abstinence and faithfulness in marriage must be promoted." The party supports an abstinence-only policy.

The party opposed the provision of the Criminal Law (Sexual Offences and Related Matters) Amendment Act, 2007 which reduced the homosexual age of consent from 19 to 16, making it equal to the heterosexual age of consent.

== History ==
According to newspaper reports at the time, the ACDP was founded on 9 December 1993. The party claims on its web site, however, that it was founded on 16 or 17 January 1994 (i.e. exactly one hundred days before South Africa's 1994 national elections). This is because the party's first official congress took place 100 days before the elections. The party's original manifesto included Christian norms, religious freedom, a freemarket system, and human rights under a federal governmental system.

== Election results ==
In its first election, the ACDP secured two seats in the national government. This made the ACDP the smallest of the seven parties in the national government of 1994. They also secured three seats in the provincial government. A year later, the ACDP won three seats in local government elections. From 1994 to 1999, four councillors from other political parties crossed the floor to join the ACDP.

In 1999, the ACDP won seven seats to become the sixth-largest party in Parliament. The party also won its first seat on the National Council of Provinces. On the provincial level, the party won four seats. A year later, the ACDP won 70 seats in the local government elections.

In 2004, the ACDP won 1.6% of the votes at national level and 1.59% of the votes at provincial level. They were now the seventh largest party, with seven seats in the National Assembly and eight seats at provincial level.

The party lost 50% of its support in the 2009 elections and continued to lose support in the 2014 elections, where it won three seats to slip to the ninth-largest party, as well as one provincial seat in the Western Cape.

In 2019, the party secured its best result since 2004, winning 0.84% of the votes at the national level. It became the sixth-largest party, with four seats in the National Assembly and three provincial seats: one each in Western Cape, Kwazulu-Natal and Gauteng.

=== National Assembly elections ===
Election	Total votes	Share of vote	Seats	+/–	Government
1994	88,104	0.45%	2 / 400	–	in opposition
1999	228,975	1.43%	6 / 400	▲4	in opposition
2004	250,272	1.60%	7 / 400	▲1	in opposition
2009	142,658	0.81%	3 / 400	▼4	in opposition
2014	104,039	0.57%	3 / 400	±0	in opposition
2019	146,262	0.84%	4 / 400	▲1	in opposition
2024	96,575	0.60% (Note: From 2024, seats in the National Assembly are determined by a combination of the national ballot, and the nine regional ballots. Only the national ballot figures are shown here.)	3 / 400	▼1	in opposition

=== Provincial elections ===
Election	Eastern Cape		Free State		Gauteng		KwaZulu-Natal		Limpopo		Mpumalanga		North-West		Northern Cape		Western Cape	
Election	%	Seats	%	Seats	%	Seats	%	Seats	%	Seats	%	Seats	%	Seats	%	Seats	%	Seats
1994	0.51%	0/56	0.45%	0/30	0.61%	1/86	0.67%	1/81	0.38%	0/40	0.48%	0/30	0.35%	0/30	0.40%	0/30	1.20%	1/42
1999	0.96%	0/63	0.90%	0/30	1.16%	1/73	1.81%	1/80	1.10%	1/49	1.12%	0/30	0.94%	0/33	1.53%	0/30	2.79%	1/42
2004	0.78%	0/63	1.30%	1/30	1.64%	1/73	1.78%	2/80	1.26%	1/49	1.09%	0/30	1.07%	0/33	1.88%	1/30	3.44%	2/42
2009	0.53%	0/63	0.73%	0/30	0.87%	1/73	0.68%	1/80	0.69%	0/49	0.51%	0/30	0.69%	0/33	1.00%	0/30	1.47%	1/42
2014	0.33%	0/63	0.51%	0/30	0.62%	0/73	0.44%	0/80	0.48%	0/49	0.40%	0/30	0.53%	0/33	0.57%	0/30	1.02%	1/42
2019	0.47%	0/63	0.42%	0/30	0.71%	1/73	0.48%	1/80	0.35%	0/49	0.51%	0/30	0.34%	0/33	0.73%	0/30	2.66%	1/42
2024	0.48%	0/73	0.48%	0/30	0.74%	1/80	0.32%	0/80	0.34%	0/64	0.47%	0/51	0.45%	0/38	0.38%	0/30	1.29%	1/42

=== Municipal elections ===
Election	Votes	%
1995–96	66,985	0.8%
2000		1.3%
2006	251 468	1.3%
2011	165,602	0.6%
2016	124,429	0.4%
2021	217,627	0.71%

== Logo ==
The ACDP logo symbolises the party's biblical Christian principles. The two horizontal arrows signify drawing South Africans from different view points and affiliations towards the Christian cross. The vertical arrows illustrate the directions up towards God and down towards South Africa. The red border signifies the blood of Jesus Christ.
