= Teófilo Hayashi =

Brazilian pastor (born 1980)

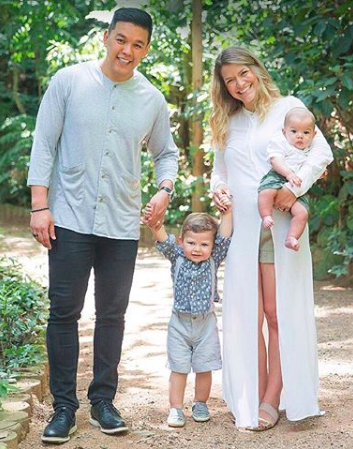
- Teo Hayashi and family
- Born: April 15, 1980 (age 45); São Paulo
- Other names: Teo Hayashi
- Citizenship: Brazil
- Occupations: Missionary, pastor, author
- Known for: Founder of the Dunamis Movement and co-founder of The Send
- Spouse: Junia Hayashi
- Children: Zack, Koa, Beni and Kaila
- Website: dunamismovement.com/site/en/teo-hayashi/

Teófilo Hayashi (April 15, 1980), best known as Teo Hayashi, is a Brazilian pastor and missionary, son and grandson of pastors. Teo Hayashi founded the Dunamis Movement in 2008, after returning from the United States, where he lived. In 2016, he participated in the event "The Call: Azusa Now" in Los Angeles, which would give rise to the movement "The Send" in 2019, of which Hayashi was one of the co-founders.

Teo Hayashi's mother, Sarah Hayashi, founded the Monte Sião Church in São Paulo, in 1977. His maternal grandparents, Hiroyuki Hayashi and Kaoru Hayashi, were missionaries and came from Japan to Brazil in 1935, with the aim of serving Japanese immigrants living in Amazonas.

== Early life ==
Teo Hayashi finished secondary school in Brazil and went to the United States to study psychology at Liberty University. It was while graduating that, according to him, he began to "deviate from the ways of the Lord." However, at the end of this period, God would have directed him to Youth With A Mission (YWAM), which he claims he had to research about, as he did not know what the organization was about. Teo Hayashi then spent three years on missions at the YWAM base in Hawaii, where he became convinced that his work should be aimed at college students, due to his own negative personal experience. He also served as a YWAM missionary in Asia, and upon returning to the United States, spent another five years working at Kingsley Fletcher Ministries.

In 2008, he abandoned his plans to remain in the United States and returned to Brazil, to serve as one of the pastors in his mother's church, Comunidade Monte Sião. In April of this same year, he founded the Dunamis Movement, with the aim of working on Gospel among young university students. It was during one of these meetings that he met his wife, Junia, with whom he had four children, Zack, Koa, Beni and Kaila.

== Beliefs ==
Teo Hayashi has a more conservative view of what the believer's role and attitudes should be in society. According to him, discussing his rejection of "hypergrace" (translated as attitudes alien to Christian conduct),

(...) relativism deconstructs and confuses the bases of faith and brings about the normalization of things that have always been absurd.

Hayashi condemns behaviors such as "consulting psychics, fortune tellers, astrology" among other things prohibited by the Bible. It also includes "listening to and dancing to music with immoral lyrics, using foul language, agreeing with abortion."

Still according to his view, the lack of a clear line separating believers from non-believers, could give rise to the "stoner Christian, the mugger Christian, the clubbing Christian, the polyamory Christian, the Christian who doesn't believe in Christ" and the like.

== The Send ==
After his participation in "The Call: Azusa Now", in 2016, Teo Hayashi became one of the organizers of "The Send" movement, preaching and mobilizing large masses of young people. Initially, the event was only held in the United States, but from 2020 onwards, it came to Brazil on the initiative of then minister Damares Alves. According to Hayashi, "The Send" is not a gospel entertainment proposal, but,

(...) a mobilization that will push young evangelicals to commit to actions. Some will embrace their school or university as a mission field, some will consider adopting an orphan and others will dedicate their lives to being sent as missionaries to a nation that has not yet been reached by the Gospel.

Hayashi does not deny that "The Send" is more than a revival movement, and that it also has an undeniable political dimension:

(...) in my way of seeing it, I believe that seeing the growth of the Evangelical Church in Brazil, seeing what the Church managed to do in favor of the transformation in Brazil's political scenario, and thinking that we are not in the revival... It's kind of like not wanting to look at what God has already started to do.

== Zion Church ==
In January 2020, the Monte Sião Church where Teo Hayashi is pastor, underwent a rebranding and was renamed "Zion Church". The global aspirations of its leadership probably explain this name change, which is highlighted on its official page welcoming the new name:

Since its foundation, the Monte Sião Church has had a calling that does not restrict this transformation to Brazil alone, but reaches out to nations and different cultures.

== Bibliography ==
- Nuvem de glória (2016) - With Sarah Hayashi
- Next level (2017)
- O Reino inabalável (2018)
- Um Poder em Movimento: Uma história do fluir Dunamis tocando gerações (2022)
