= Rees Howells =

British missionary (1879–1950)

- Born: 10 October 1879; Brynamman, Wales
- Died: 13 February 1950 (age 71); Wales

Rees Howells (10 October 1879 – 13 February 1950) was the founder of The Bible College of Wales.

Howells was born in Brynamman in Carmarthenshire, Wales. When he was 12 years old he left school and worked in a tin mill and coal mine. He later went to the USA for better financial benefits where he met a Jewish Christian named Maurice Reuben who followed Jesus Christ as the Messiah. Howells also read a book of Professor Henry Drummond. Both influences caused him to become an Evangelical Christian. Later he returned to Wales. He was affected by the 1904–1905 Welsh Revival.

On December 21, 1910, he married Elizabeth Jones and they received missionary training in Edinburgh and London. They were later missionaries in Africa. He was led down the path of intercession for many years, before seeing revival across Southern Africa from 1915 to 1920. The rise of Adolf Hitler and the outbreak of World War II also marked a period of strong activity in Howells' ministry of intercession.

The Howells had one child, a son named Samuel Rees Howells, who later became the Director of the Bible College of Wales. Samuel died on 18 March 2004.

In 1924 he founded the Bible College of Wales in Swansea, Wales. After a long period of closure the College was later purchased, refurbished and reopened by Cornerstone Community Church based in Singapore.

== Bibliography ==
- God Challenges the Dictators, Doom of the Nazis Predicted by Rees Howells, 1939, annotated 2020 by Mathew Backholer, ByFaith Media.
- Rees Howells Intercessor by Norman Grubb, Philadelphia: Christian Literature Crusade, 1952.
- The Intercession of Rees Howells by Doris M. Ruscoe, Cambridge: Lutterworth, 1983.
- Samuel Rees Howells: A Life of Intercession by Richard Maton, ByFaith Media, 2012. The story of Rees Howells and how his son Samuel followed him to become an intercessor.
- Samuel, Son and Successor of Rees Howells by Richard Maton, ByFaith Media, 2012. Covers much of the story of Rees Howells, his legacy and the influence Rees Howells had upon his son Samuel Rees Howells.
- Rees Howells’ God Challenges the Dictators, Doom of Axis Powers Predicted by Rees Howells and Mathew Backholer, ByFaith Media, 2020.
- Rees Howells, Vision Hymns of Spiritual Warfare Intercessory Declarations by Rees Howells and Mathew Backholer, ByFaith Media, 2021.
- Rees Howells, Life of Faith, Intercession, Spiritual Warfare & Walking in the Spirit by Rees Howells and Mathew Backholer, ByFaith Media, 2022.
- Rees Howells, Monument of Faith, History of The Bible College of Wales 1922-1932 by Rees Howells and Mathew Backholer, ByFaith Media, 2024.

== See also ==
- Spiritual warfare
