= Todd White (pastor) =

American pastor

Todd White is an American pastor and evangelist. He is founder and President of Lifestyle Christianity University in Watauga, Texas.

White is a former drug addict and former atheist, and dates his conversion to 2004. He is the author of Life is Short - Leave a Legacy (2020). He was criticized in the documentary American Gospel: Christ Alone and responded by calling it "demonically inspired".

In 2022, White revealed that he has a heart condition in which his heart pumps at limited capacity.

He has sparked controversy by teaching the prosperity gospel, claiming to cast out demons, and telling people to discard prescription medications.
