= The Ordinary Radicals =

Ordinary Radicals
- Theatrical release poster
- Directed by: Jamie Moffett
- Produced by: Shannon Oberg; Kevin Hackenberg
- Starring: Chris Haw; Shane Claiborne
- Release date: September 4, 2008
- Running time: 99 minutes
- Country: United States
- Language: English

The Ordinary Radicals is a 2008 documentary film directed by Philadelphia filmmaker Jamie Moffett.

== Background ==
The film follows authors Chris Haw and Shane Claiborne, co-founders of the Potter Street Community (formerly The Simple Way) of Philadelphia, Pennsylvania, on their Jesus for President: Politics for Ordinary Radicals book tour.

Claiborne and Haw began their 23 city, 11,000 mile journey in June 2008 on a refurbished school bus fueled by used vegetable oil. Before starting the book tour the crew attended the P.A.P.A (People Against Poverty and Apathy) Festival in Grand Rapids, Michigan, which is a gathering of Christian community oriented individuals who use a combination of music, workshops, and Bible studies to discuss issues concerning community, theology and peacemaking. The Festival is organized entirely by volunteers and is funded completely by donations. Next, the crew stopped at the Zondervan headquarters followed by the first stop of the book tour at megachurch Mars Hill Bible Church, where Rob Bell was the head pastor. The tour continued through the United States and Canada, stopping at several other cities and churches.

== Summary ==
The tour takes place during the 2008 U.S. presidential elections which becomes a topic of discussion for Claiborne and Haw while touring. After a speaking engagement in Pittsburgh Claiborne tells CNN during an interview in regards to the following of young evangels that the movement and tour has attracted:"This is not about going left or right, this is about going deeper and trying to understand together. Rather than endorse candidates, we ask them to endorse what is at the heart of Jesus and that is the poor or the peacemakers and when we see that then we'll get behind them".

The documentary discusses Christianity from the standpoint of social justice advocacy and outreach. Claiborne and Bell are considered to be part of the new emerging church movement. This movement which emphasizes following Jesus through non-violence, love of enemy and caring for the poor is also known as New Monasticism. New Monasticism communities, where Claiborne himself is a member, can be identified by 12 "marks". Claiborne explains that:" The marks show the common threads that connect Christian communities that might otherwise be seen as scattered anomalies, rather than vibrant cells of a body". The tour expresses the beliefs of this movement and received acknowledgments from many respected individuals and scholars in the fields of Theology and Christian left thinking. Theologian and activist, Ron Sider stated:" The book and tour's decided mix of social justice and Christian outreach form a new wave for evangelicals in the U.S." Sider is the Professor of Theology, Holistic Ministry and Public Policy at Palmer Theological Seminary in Wynnewood, Pa., and founder of Evangelicals for Social Action. As the film continues viewers are introduced to a variety of people advocating social justice. One of these individuals is Sister Margret Mckenna, who is the founder and director of New Jerusalem Now. This organization, located in North Philadelphia, is a recovery option for addicts that offers community style living and treatment for their addictions. Mckenna credits the success of the program to the community environment individuals are given when choosing New Jerusalem, the community forces individuals to change their behavior —"and changing behavior is key to recovery. In these medical models of recovery, there's no community obligation, you're just a patient. The day they get out, they use. I've heard that I don't know how many times." Other featured interviews include pastor, author, sociologist, and public speaker Tony Campolo and author Becky Garrison.

Claiborne and Haw challenge tradition thinking about Christianity and in an excerpt from their book state: “This is not a set of political suggestions for the world; this is about invoking and embodying the alternative. All of this is an invitation to join a peculiar people- those with no king but God, who practice jubilee economics and make the world new. This is not the old-time religion of going to heaven; this is about bringing heaven to the world.”

== Featuring ==
The film features and contains interviews with

- Shane Claiborne
- Chris Haw
- Jim Wallis
- Brian McLaren
- John M Perkins
- Brooke Sexton
- Rick Perlstein
- Sr. Margaret McKenna
- Logan Laituri
- Zack Exley
- Aaron Weiss
- Becky Garrison
- Lisa Sharon Harper
- Leroy Barber

== Festivals ==
The Ordinary Radicals was screened in various film festivals including Pocono Mountain Film Festival], where it was nominated for best documentary in 2009, the Fallbrook Film Festival in Bonsall, California, the Crossroads Film Festival in Jackson, Mississippi, the Garden State Film Festival, the Ion Film Festival in Dubai, UAE, the Alcolade Film Awards, the Flickerings Film Show Case, the Hoboken Film Festival, and the Okanagan Film Festival in Kelowna, BC.
