= Progressive Christianity (disambiguation) =

Progressive Christianity is a movement within Christianity.

Progressive Christianity or Progressive Christian may also refer to:

- Progressive Christianity (organization), an American Christian organization founded in 1996
- The Progressive Christian, a defunct American Christian magazine
