= Jesus for President =

2008 book by Chris Haw and Shane Claiborne

- First edition cover
- Author: Shane Claiborne, Chris Haw
- Cover artist: Chico Fajardo-Heflin, Tatiana Fajardo-Heflin
- Language: English
- Subject: American imperialism, Christian pacifism, new monasticism, self-denial, social justice
- Publisher: Zondervan
- Publication date: 2008
- Publication place: United States
- Pages: 304
- ISBN: 978-0-310-27842-9
- Dewey Decimal: 261.70973
- LC Class: BR526 .C567 2008

Jesus for President: Politics for Ordinary Radicals is a 2008 book co-written by the evangelical authors Shane Claiborne and Chris Haw, two important figures in New Monasticism. The book asserts that the countercultural themes in the ministry of Jesus, such as those of self-denial, are ignored by American Christians because they have become accustomed to exercising Christian privilege and are unwilling to give it up.

Jesus for President received generally positive reviews from critics in both secular and Christian media. David Swanson wrote a three-part review of Jesus for President in Christianity Today, in which he argues that "Claiborne and Haw make a compelling case that the church in America has become much too cozy with the state". Mark Tooley of the Institute on Religion and Democracy was heavily critical of the book, calling the book's pacifism both utopian and anti-American.

== Background ==
Jesus for President was first published in March 2008 and had sold more than 300,000 copies by that December.

Claiborne and Haw first met in the 2000s, when they were both living in different Christian intentional communities in the United States. Claiborne wrote The Irresistible Revolution: Living as an Ordinary Radical, his debut book, in 2006. Haw was a theology graduate student at Villanova University when Jesus for President was released. Claiborne said that the title of the book is not to be taken literally, and that "Jesus' political manifesto is a terrible plan for running a superpower".

Jesus for President became a bestseller. All proceeds from sales of the book went towards the Jubilee Fund, a nonprofit organization founded by Claiborne and others in support of international community projects. An audiobook edition of Jesus for President was released in 2009.

== Content ==
Jesus for President is structured as a series of loosely interrelated narratives. The book combines practical theology, biblical theology, ecclesiastical history, contemporary stories, political manifesto, and Bible stories. The book draws on both the Old and New Testaments, and includes frequent quotations from Church Fathers, such as Justin Martyr and Tertullian.

The book is intended to present an accessible account of scholarly findings regarding the New Testament's teachings on the subject of empire. Likening Jesus to an American political candidate, Jesus for President identifies Luke 4:18–19 as the commencement speech of Jesus' campaign, "Jubilee" as his campaign slogan, and the revival of ancient Jubilee economics as his platform. The book asserts that the countercultural themes in the ministry of Jesus, such as those of self-denial, are ignored by the church because the Church is more interested in conforming its members to the state than to the Kingdom of God. The book warns against the lures of political and financial power. While the book suggests that Christians should live counterculturally in accordance with Jesus' teachings, the authors do not prescribe how Christians should accomplish this task. Neither do they advocate restructuring the economic or political systems of the United States. The book promotes pacifism, criticizes the 2003 invasion of Iraq, and expounds liberation theology.

Jesus for President is divided into four chapters, the first two of which summarize the Bible from a New Monastic perspective. The summary of the Old Testament argues that the Israelites had a unique political philosophy, but that they failed to live up to its implications. The New Testament summary considers Jesus' politics and the qualities of the Christian Church. The third chapter suggests implications of this narrative for citizens of the United States, who the authors describe as members of an empire similar to that of the Romans. This chapter argues that the Book of Revelation has more to do with living faithfully in an evil empire than with eschatology. The chapter also asserts that Constantinianism had generally negative consequences for the Church. The fourth chapter tells of Christians living in countercultural ways that model divine redemption towards others. Other stories involve heterodox economics, defending the homeless, Amish forgiveness, dumpster diving, missional robotics, Martin Luther King Jr., anti-war protests, and The Simple Way.

== Tour ==
Claiborne and Haw promoted Jesus for President by going on a U.S. speaking tour of 30 cities. The tour led up to the 2008 United States presidential election, and the book tour was suggestive of a third party candidate campaign for Jesus. The authors' speeches did not attempt to sway their audiences towards or away from any particular candidates, but rather encouraged them to endorse whichever candidates supported Christian values.

CNN's senior political analyst Bill Schneider predicted that Claiborne's and Haw's "impact is likely to be that they will dilute the Evangelical support for the Republican Party and the Evangelical vote will be more up for grabs than it has in many years".

After reading and being impressed by Jesus for President, Ben Cohen of the ice cream company Ben & Jerry's met with Claiborne. They decided to launch a variety show in September 2011 called Jesus, Bombs, & Ice Cream. Coinciding with the 10th anniversary of the September 11 attacks, the show called for the military budget of the United States to be decreased.

== Reception ==
=== Secular media ===
Publishers Weekly called Jesus for President "the must-read election-year book for Christian Americans" and an "entertaining yet provocative tour of the Bible's social and economic order [that] makes even the most abstruse Levitical laws come alive for our era." In a Library Journal review, George Westerlund recommends that large libraries purchase Jesus for President, writing that the book is a good read even for readers who theologically or philosophically differ from Claiborne and Haw. Susan Campbell wrote about the book and the tour in the Hartford Courant, calling the book "bare-knuckle" and "deceptively deep".

=== Christian media ===
British Baptist minister Steve Chalke called it "a radical manifesto to awaken the Christian political imagination [to] what the Church could look like if it placed its faith in Jesus instead of Caesar." Chalke argues that the book transcends questions of voting and explores more fundamental issues, such as allegiance and faith.

American activist David Swanson wrote a three-part review of Jesus for President in Christianity Today, in which he writes that the popularity of the book is due to its "prophetic zeal and prankster's wit". Swanson argues that "Claiborne and Haw make a compelling case that the church in America has become much too cozy with the state", a case that Swanson finds to align with his own personal observations. While agreeing that the gospel should take precedence over secular affairs, Jordan Hylden of Christianity Today writes that Claiborne and Haw advocate for too great a withdrawal from secular politics. Hylden writes that he favors the arguments of Paul the Apostle and Martin Luther, who Hylden claims all reason that Christians should engage with government because God works through such institutions providentially.

Joan Braune of America, a Jesuit magazine, writes that Jesus for President implicitly supports Christian anarchism.

In December 2008, Mark Tooley, then director of the Institute on Religion and Democracy's United Methodist committee, wrote an opinion piece about Jesus for President in the conservative magazine The Weekly Standard. Tooley is critical of the book, writing, that "Claiborne insists on a narrowly reinterpreted Jesus" who is "more social critic than Resurrected Redeemer." Christopher Hitchens, an Anglo-American antitheist, wrote a response to Tooley's review in the British tabloid newspaper the Sunday Express. He argues that Claiborne and Tooley are both attempting to justify their own views by ascribing them to Jesus, with Claiborne arguing that a Jesus would have supported liberation theology and Tooley arguing that Jesus would have supported neoconservatism.

In 2012, David P. Gushee, director of Mercer University's Center for Theology and Public Life, named Jesus for President one of the five best books about patriotism, the others being Bonhoeffer's Ethics; Bruce Lincoln's Religion, Empire and Torture; Reinhold Niebuhr's Moral Man and Immoral Society; and A Testament of Hope, a collection of Martin Luther King Jr.'s speeches and writings.
