= Jamie Moffett =

American film director

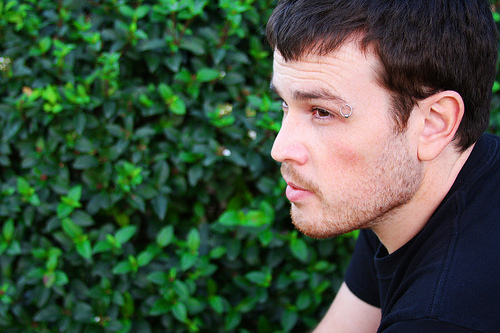
- Moffett in Florence, 2007
- Occupations: Director, producer

Jamie Moffett is an American independent motion picture director, producer, and social activist.

== Personal background ==
Moffett attended Eastern University. After graduation, Moffett co-founded The Simple Way, a non-profit organization focused on community development in Kensington, Philadelphia along with Shane Claiborne in January 1998.

== Career ==
In 2003, Moffett was nominated for a Barrymore Award in Outstanding Theatre Sound Design.

In 2008 Moffett premiered his first feature documentary film, The Ordinary Radicals, in which Moffett followed authors Shane Claiborne and Chris Haw on their 11,000 mile "Jesus for President" book tour.

Moffett's second feature, "Return to El Salvador", documents the aftermath of a 12-year civil war and the interplay between the Salvadoran people and the US politics and policies that directly influence the Central American country. Narrated by Martin Sheen, the film includes an interview of former US ambassador to El Salvador Robert White, and an endorsement by Nobel Peace Prize winner Archbishop Desmond Tutu.

== Social activism ==
Jamie Moffett has also gained media recognition for his advocacy efforts in the areas of urban poverty, crime reduction, and homelessness. He is the founder of a Philadelphia-based campaign, Kensington Renewal Initiative, which was created to garner local and statewide support to decrease drug-related crime in the low income, urban Kensington neighborhood. Moffett established his film studio across the street from The Simple Way in Kensington in 2007, and was immediately troubled by the high levels of drug activity within the vacant house behind his studio. Moffett discovered that the house and over 300 other vacant properties in the area were owned by notorious slumlord, Robert (Bob) Coyle.

After a failed attempt to purchase the blighted property from Coyle in 2007, Moffett launched the Kensington Renewal Initiative to make an official, determined effort to lessen the crime correlated to the vacant properties by working to rehabilitate the homes and resell them as owner-occupied properties. In 2012, Coyle was indicted and imprisoned with multiple counts of fraud, and the Kensington Renewal Initiative rehabilitated its first home.

Moffett explains his perspective on why he began Kensington Renewal Initiative, “The light bulb went on for me when I took a look at the city block and thought of it from a movie director’s perspective. The question became, what kind of movie do I want to be in? Do I want to be in a crazy drug-addled, post-apocalyptic nightmare or do I want to be in a great clean environment with plants and trees and flowers and kids playing?"

Moffett's Initiative takes the position that by denying loans to high credit families pursuing lower-value homes, illegal drug activity is perpetuated in dilapidated, owner-vacancy lots in urban neighborhoods like Kensington. Moffett's initiative gained the support of Senator Bob Casey, Jr. when the Senator toured the neighborhood with Moffett in October 2012. The Senator found Moffett's platform be true, and began efforts to ease this burden and increase opportunities for homeownership for low-income families.

Moffett's ultimate goal for Kensington Renewal Initiative is to develop a best-practices model from the Kensington project to be implemented to other urban areas in the United States to decrease crime by increasing the opportunities to establish owner-occupied properties in low income neighborhoods nationwide.

== Filmography ==
- Return to El Salvador (2010)
- The Ordinary Radicals: Special Topics Volume 1 - Heaven and Earth (2009)
- The Mysterious Death of Marcelo Rivera (2009)
- Cornel West: A Dialogue on Race in the Church and Society (2008)
- The Ordinary Radicals (2008)
- Another World Is Possible: Volume 3 - Creation (2007)
- Another World Is Possible: Volume 2 - Poverty (2006)
- Another World Is Possible: Volume 1 - War (2005)
