= Campolo =

Campolo is a surname. Notable people with the surname include:

- Antonio Campolo (1897–1959), Uruguayan footballer
- Bart Campolo, American humanist speaker and writer
- Placido Campolo (1693–1743), Italian painter
- Sergio Campolo (born 1972), Italian footballer
- Tony Campolo (1935–2024), American sociologist, pastor, author, and public speaker
