= Evangelical left =

Christian left movement

The Evangelical left is a Christian left movement in evangelical Christianity that affirms conservative evangelical theology and are politically progressive. It is mainly based in the US, but is also found in Latin America.

== Doctrine ==
The movement affirms conservative evangelical theology, such as the doctrines of the incarnation, atonement, and resurrection, and viewing the Bible as the primary authority for the Church. Most leaders in the movement hold a traditional view of marriage. However, in the 2010s, some leaders have stated their support for same-sex marriage, citing their biblical studies on the subject and spiritual growth as the primary purpose of marriage. Unlike other evangelicals, those on the evangelical left often support and utilize modern biblical exegesis. They often support a more progressive political platform and are concerned about issues of social justice. Many, for example, are opposed to capital punishment and are supportive of gun control, welfare programs and welcoming foreigners. In many cases, they are also pacifists.

== History ==
The origins of the movement are located in the 16th century in the Anabaptist movement which fought against The Establishment and campaigned for democracy. Other movements were significant, such as Abolitionism in the United Kingdom of the 18th century and Abolitionism in the United States of the 19th century. Some evangelicals have campaigned for women's rights, such as pastoral ordination and right to vote.

Due to the fundamentalist controversy of the early 20th century, the movement and social activism lost momentum. In the late 1940s, evangelical theologians from Fuller Theological Seminary founded in Pasadena, California, in 1947, championed the Christian importance of social activism. It experienced a new impetus in the 1960s with the foundation of the Southern Christian Leadership Conference in 1957, led by Baptist pastor Martin Luther King Jr.

During the 1960s and 1970s, the evangelical left stood for antiwar, civil rights, and anti-consumption principles while supporting doctrinal fidelity and conservative sexual morals. Sojourners magazine, founded in 1971, has been an important voice of the movement. In 1973, 53 evangelical leaders signed The Chicago Declaration of Evangelical Social Concern, which contributed to the foundation of Evangelicals for Social Action. The evangelical left had influence in electing the first born-again U.S. president, Jimmy Carter, in 1976.

== 21st century ==
In 2007, the organization Red-Letter Christians was founded by Baptist pastor Tony Campolo and Shane Claiborne with the aim of bringing together evangelicals who believe in the importance of insisting on issues of social justice mentioned by Jesus (in red in some translations of the Bible). The election of Donald Trump in 2016 led to a resurgence of the evangelical left against some of his policies. Some evangelical Christians see the phrase as political and have since changed how they name themselves.

== See also ==
- Christian anarchism
- Christian left
- Christian socialism
- Evangelical environmentalism
- Liberal Christianity
- Progressive Christianity
- Red-Letter Christians
- Social Gospel
- Sojourners
