= Evangelical Bloc =

Evangelical bloc may refer to:

- The Evangelical part of the Christian right in various countries
- The Evangelical left
- Evangelicalism in the United States § Politics and social issues
