= Eastern University (United States) =

Christian university in St. Davids, Pennsylvania, US

- Former names: Eastern Baptist Theological Seminary (1925–1952); Eastern Baptist College (1952–1972); Eastern College (1972–2001)
- Motto: Faith, Reason and Justice
- Type: Private university
- Established: 1925; 101 years ago
- Accreditation: MSCHE
- Religious affiliation: ABCUSA
- President: Ronald A. Matthews
- Faculty: 110 full-time and 282 part-time (fall 2023)
- Students: 8,729 (fall 2024)
- Undergraduates: 2,500 (fall 2024)
- Postgraduates: 6,227 (fall 2024)
- Location: St. Davids, Pennsylvania, U.S.
- Campus: 114 acres (46 ha); Suburban
- Colors: Maroon and white
- Sporting affiliations: NCAA Division III – MAC Commonwealth Conference
- Mascot: Eagle
- Website: eastern.edu
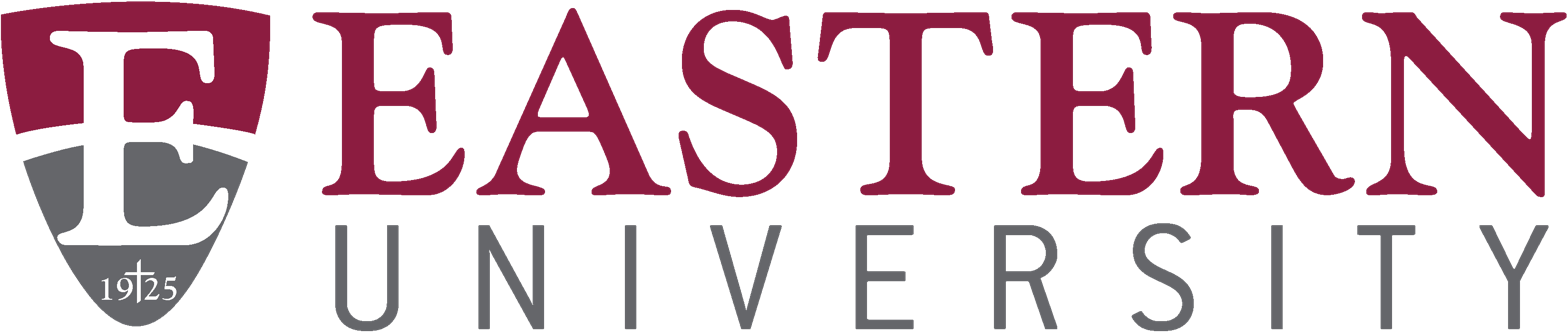

Eastern University (EU) is a private Christian university located in St. Davids, Pennsylvania, United States. Eastern has additional campus locations in Philadelphia and Ripley, West Virginia. The university offers undergraduate, graduate, and seminary programs. Eastern University is affiliated with the American Baptist Churches USA (ABCUSA), and is the parent institution of the Palmer Theological Seminary. While the university itself is affiliated with the ABCUSA, the student body, faculty, and administration are interdenominational.

== History ==
The university has its origins in the foundation of the Eastern Baptist Theological Seminary. The Seminary was founded in 1925 by six Conservative Baptist pastors from the American Baptist Publication Society in Philadelphia with the goal of providing pastors for Baptist churches who were educated on both biblical and cultural matters.

In 1932, collegiate classes were added to the curriculum for pastors at the Seminary. In 1952, the Seminary opened a separate institution, the Eastern Baptist College in Saint Davids, Pennsylvania, on the former estate of businessman Charles S. Walton. The Eastern Baptist College focused on liberal arts rather than educating and training pastors, as the Seminary continued to exist and do so separately from the College. In 1972, the college was renamed to Eastern College: A Baptist Institution.

In 2001, the Pennsylvania Department of Education granted the institution university status and it was renamed to Eastern University. In 2004, the institution's board of trustees voted to acquire the Eastern Baptist Theological Seminary, the original parent institution of the university. The following year, the seminary's name was changed to Palmer Theological Seminary in honor of its longest serving president, Gordon Palmer (1936–1948).

In November 2022, the university added sexual orientation to its anti-discrimination policy, allowing the hiring of openly LGBT employees. Following this decision, its membership in the Council for Christian Colleges and Universities was revoked.

== Campus ==
The main campus is located in on 114 acres (46 ha) of land in Radnor Township, just west of Philadelphia. It has a St. Davids postal address, but is outside of (though adjacent to) the St. Davids census-designated place.

The main campus was originally a private estate, named Walmarthon, which was owned by leather tanning businessman Charles S. Walton. The size of the campus has expanded through purchases of surrounding buildings and land. The original buildings on campus were designed by locally renowned architect David Knickerbacker Boyd, in the Mediterranean style.

The Warner Memorial Library is housed in the Harold Howard Center. The Mazie Hall African American History Room contains books and memorabilia from a local educator. The Edison Room houses several drawings and artifacts which belonged to Thomas Edison.

The Bradstreet Observatory consists of twin 14.5-foot diameter domes that house 16” diameter Meade LX200 Schmidt-Cassegrain telescopes. This addition to Eastern’s facilities created opportunities for astronomical work and research done on campus.

Eastern University's main campus is located adjacent to Villanova University's Cabrini Campus, the former site of the now-defunct Cabrini College. Eagle Road in Radnor divides the two campuses. The St. David's SEPTA Station is located approximately 0.5 miles from Eastern's main campus, where SEPTA operates the Paoli-Thorndale Line.

In addition to the main campus in St. Davids, Eastern has additional sites in Pennsylvania: Center City, Philadelphia; City Avenue, Philadelphia; and N 5th St, Philadelphia.

Eastern University also manages a campus in Ripley, West Virginia. The campus is managed in conjunction with the West Virginia Baptist Convention. Students at the West Virginia campus are enrolled in the Master of Divinity program, as it is the only program offered at the Ripley campus.

== Academics ==
Eastern University offers associate, bachelor's, master's, and doctorate degrees in more than 100 areas of study. The university also offers undergraduate, graduate and noncredit certificates. Academic programs at the institution are housed in seven schools:

- College of Arts and Humanities
- College of Business and Leadership
- College of Education
- College of Health and Sciences
- Palmer Theological Seminary
- Templeton Honors College
- Esperanza College

== Admission and demographics ==
Student body composition as of Fall 2023
Race and ethnicity	Total
White	38%
Black	28%
Hispanic	16%
Other (Note: Other consists of Multiracial Americans & those who prefer to not say.)	12%
Foreign national	5%
Asian	2%

=== Demographics ===
Eastern University enrolled nearly 10,000 students in Fall 2025, with 2,256 undergraduate students and 6,903 postgraduate students. The undergraduate student body is 62% female and 38% male. For traditional undergraduate students, the student-to-faculty ratio is 11:1.

=== Admission ===
Eastern University's overall acceptance rate in 2023 was 94%, with a 72% retention rate for first-year undergraduate students.

Eastern University is test-optional, allowing applicants to submit scores for the ACT or SAT if applicants wish to do so. These test scores are not required for admission.

== Accreditation ==
Eastern University is accredited by the Middle States Commission on Higher Education. Several programs are also accredited:

- Accreditation Council for Business Schools and Programs (ACBSP)
- Association of Theological Schools in the U.S. and Canada
- Association for Behavior Analysis International (Verified Course Sequence for Board Certified Behavior Analysts)
- Commission on Accreditation of Allied Health Education Programs
- Commission on Accreditation of Athletic Training Education
- Commission on Collegiate Nursing Education (CCNE)
- Council on Social Work Education (CSWE) for the Baccalaureate Major in Social Work
- Master’s in Psychology and Counseling Accreditation Council (MPCAC)

== Student media ==
The Waltonian is Eastern University's student-run newspaper. It is published monthly, and covers university, national, and international news.

Inklings is Eastern University's student-run literary magazine. It is published annually and features poetry, short stories, and photography.

Eastern is the magazine of Eastern University. It serves as a connection between the campus community of students, faculty, staff and administration and its alumni, trustees, friends, donors, parents and neighbors.

== Athletics ==
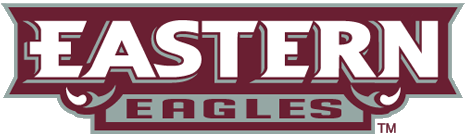
Eastern Eagles wordmark

The school's sports teams are called the Eagles and are Division III members of the National Collegiate Athletic Association (NCAA). Eastern University joined the Middle Atlantic Conferences (commonly referred to as the MAC) in 2008.

Sports include men's and women's soccer, men's and women's basketball, men's and women's volleyball, men's and women's lacrosse, men's baseball, women's field hockey, women's flag football, men's football, women's softball, men's and women's tennis, men's and women's golf, and cross country. Eastern began fielding a football team in 2022 as an NCAA Division III independent and began playing in the MAC in 2023. Women's flag football was added in the 2024–25 school year, competing in the Division III Atlantic East Conference.

In 2002, senior Andrea Collesidis broke an NCAA scoring record for women's lacrosse.

== Notable alumni ==
=== Alumni ===
- Morgan Hikaru Aiken, professional basketball player
- Imani Barbarin, writer and disability rights activist
- Tony Campolo, sociologist and pastor
- Shane Claiborne, author, prominent figure in New Monasticism movement, founder of The Simple Way
- Carolivia Herron, scholar of African-American Judaica
- Willie J. Hill Jr., bishop of the Reformed Episcopal Church
- Doug Mastriano, politician and retired military officer
- Jamie Moffett, film director, producer, and social activist
- Richard Muenz, actor and singer
- Marvin Rees, mayor of Bristol, England
- Brandon 'Scoop B' Robinson, sports writer, radio host, television personality most notably with CBS Sports Radio
- Bryan Stevenson, founder and executive director of the Equal Justice Initiative
- Regina Young, member of the Pennsylvania House of Representatives

=== Faculty ===
- Phillip Cary, philosophy professor, philosopher, Augustine scholar, and author (retired)
- Peter Enns, history of religions professor, scholar, author
- Wilson Goode, professor emeritus and former mayor of Philadelphia
- Christopher Hall, emeritus professor, Episcopalian theologian
- Ron Sider, professor, activist, author, and founder/president emeritus of Evangelicals for Social Action
