= Progressive Christianity =

Postmodern theological approach

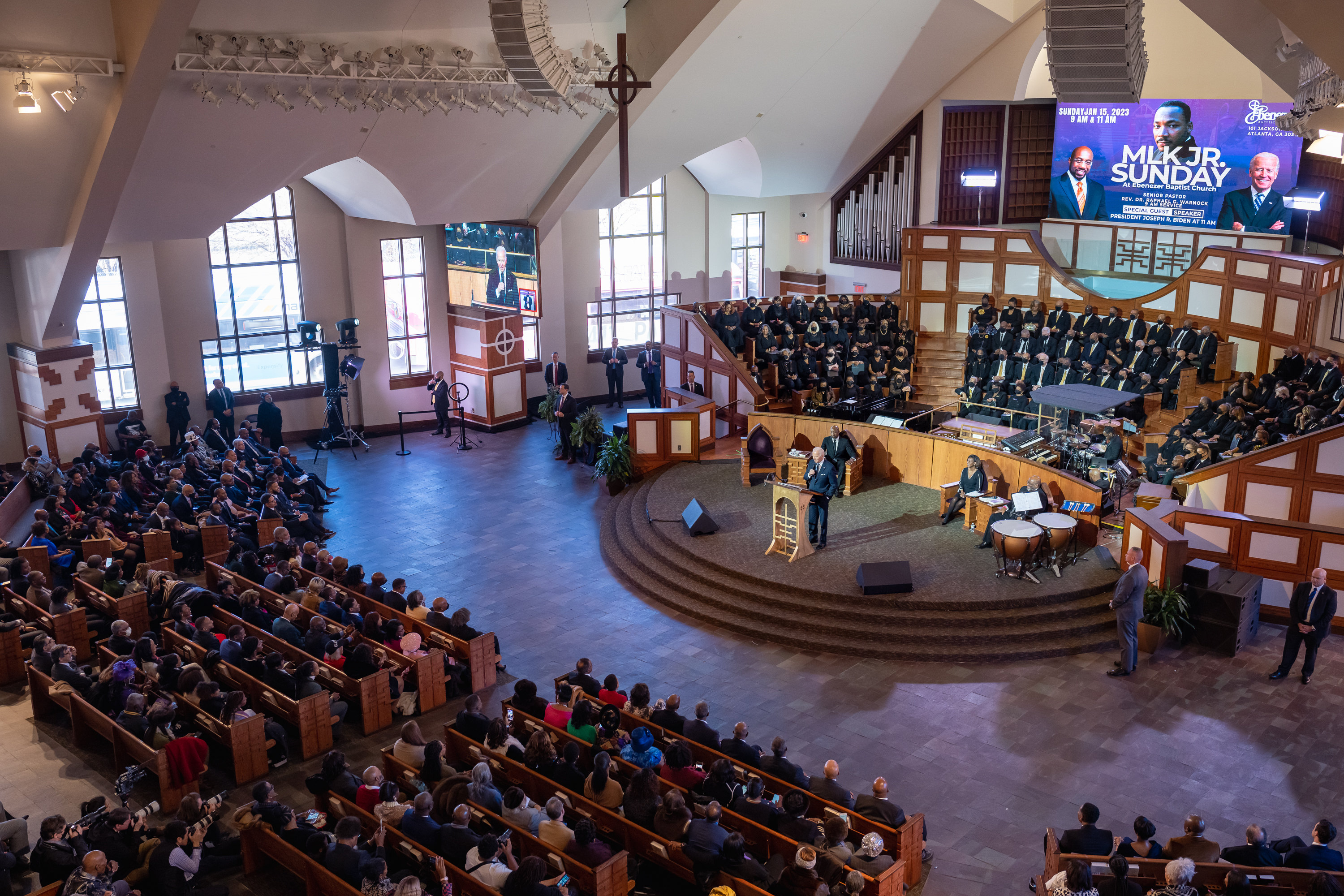
Service at Ebenezer Baptist Church in Atlanta (Georgia), affiliated with the Progressive National Baptist Convention

Progressive Christianity represents a range of related perspectives in contemporary Christian theology and practice. It is a postmodern theological approach, which developed out of the liberal Christianity of the modern era, although progressive Christians would claim that ideas relating Christianity to social justice are at the heart of the Christian message and stem from biblical themes.

Integrating and moving beyond the Enlightenment concerns of liberalism, Progressive Christianity is a postliberal theological movement.

Progressive Christianity, as described by its adherents, is characterized by a willingness to question tradition, acceptance of human diversity, a strong emphasis on social justice and care for the poor and the oppressed, and environmental stewardship of the earth. Progressive Christians have a deep belief in the centrality of the instruction to "love one another" (John 15:17) within the teachings of Jesus Christ. It is an ecumenical movement present in various Christian denominations. It is particularly influential in mainline Protestantism, with some influence among liberal and Post-Vatican II Roman Catholicism (especially those influenced by movements such as liberation theology), and American evangelicalism, particularly the emerging Church and exvangelical movements, and the evangelical left.

== History ==
=== Origins ===
The term "progressive Christianity" was coined by the German-American Lutheran pastor and scholar, John H. W. Stuckenberg:

"I favor a progressive Christianity based on the living teachings of Christ and his Apostles. I am opposed to the stagnation created by religious dogmatism and traditionalism, and wish none of my possessions to be used in the interest of this stagnation."

— John H. W. Stuckenberg, last will and testament, June 6, 1898

A priority of justice and care for the down-trodden are a recurrent theme in the Hebrew prophetic tradition inherited by Christianity. This has been reflected in many later Christian traditions of service and ministry, and more recently in the United States of America through Christian involvement in political trends such as the Progressive Movement and the Social Gospel.

Throughout the 20th century, a strand of progressive or liberal Christian thought outlined the values of a 'good society'. It stresses fairness, justice, responsibility, and compassion, and condemns the forms of governance that wage unjust war, rely on corruption for continued power, deprive the poor of facilities, or exclude particular racial or sexual groups from fair participation in national liberties. It was influential in the US mainline churches, and reflected global trends in student activism. It contributed to ecumenism and the development of the World Student Christian Federation and the World Council of Churches., and at the national level through groups such as the National Council of Churches in the US and Australian Student Christian Movement.

=== Contemporary movement ===
In 1961, a group of pastors from the National Baptist Convention, USA wishing to become more involved with civil rights founded the Progressive National Baptist Convention.

The Sojourners magazine was founded in 1971 by the Sojourners Community and was the first progressive magazine.

The Center for Progressive Christianity was founded in 1996 by Episcopal priest James Rowe Adams in Cambridge, Massachusetts, with the aim of bringing together progressive Christian organizations and churches.

In 2007, the Red-Letter Christians movement was founded by Baptist pastor Tony Campolo and Shane Claiborne in order to offer Christian resources about various social issues, such as a blog, a podcast, and conferences.

In the UK, the Progressive Christianity Britain network was founded in 2003 and has adopted eight non-credal points which reflect the nature of a Christian life explored from a progressive standpoint. The network holds group meetings in many locations around the country.

According to Archbishop Wynn Wagner of the former North American Old Catholic Church, inclusiveness and acceptance is the basic posture of progressive Christianity.

The dominance of evangelicalism in the US, particularly in its more socially conservative forms, challenged many people in mainline churches. This has enabled many Christians who are uncomfortable with conservative evangelicalism to identify themselves explicitly as "progressive Christians".

== Beliefs ==
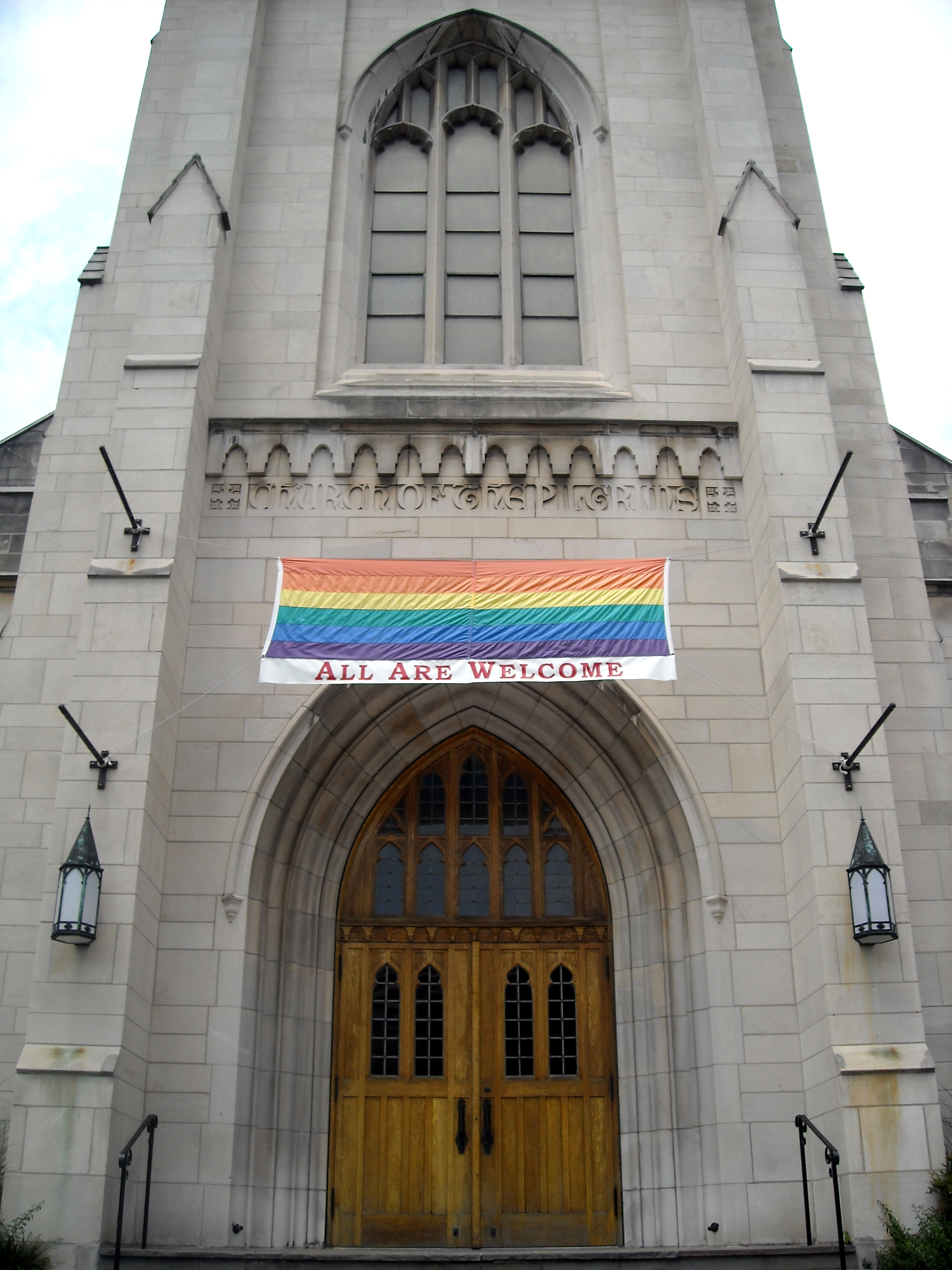
Pride flag banner hung over the entrance to the Church of the Pilgrims in Washington, D.C.

Progressive Christianity is the post-modern influenced evolution of historic mainline liberal Protestant Christianity and it is an heir to the Social Gospel movement. It draws from process theology, liberation theology, feminist theology, womanist theology, affirming theology, and eco-theology as well. Progressive Christianity focuses on promoting values such as compassion, justice, mercy, and tolerance, often through political activism. Though prominent, the movement is by no means the only significant movement of progressive thought among Christians. It draws influence from multiple theological streams, including evangelicalism, liberal Christianity, neo-orthodoxy, pragmatism, postmodern theology, and liberation theology. The concerns of feminism are also a major influence on the movement, as expressed in feminist and womanist theologies. Although progressive Christianity and liberal Christianity are often used synonymously, the two movements are distinct, despite much overlap. While there is some philosophical overlap, progressive Christianity is not synonymous with progressive politics.

The term was coined by German-American, Lutheran pastor and scholar, Rev. John H. W. Stuckenberg. "I favor a progressive Christianity based on the living teachings of Christ and his Apostles. I am opposed to the stagnation created by religious dogmatism and traditionalism, and wish none of my possessions to be used in the interest of this stagnation." (last will and testament, June 6, 1898) The term was later embraced by retired Episcopal priest Rev. Jim Adams who founded The Center for Progressive Christianity in 1996—which has since become ProgressiveChristianity.Org. That organization has promoted "The 8 Points of Progressive Christianity", and has since established the 5 Core Values of Progressive Christianity other variations include The Phoenix Confessions.

=== Environmental ministries ===
Central to this recovery of awe in the cosmos is the epic of evolution, the 14-billion-year history of the universe. Scientists (Edward O. Wilson, Brian Swimme, Eric Chaisson, Ursula Goodenough and others) initiated this story which has been perpetuated with a religion component by some liberal theologians (Gordon D. Kaufman, Jerome A. Stone, Michael Dowd, etc.).

Evolutionary evangelist and progressive minister Michael Dowd uses the term Epic of Evolution or Great Story to help construct his viewpoint of evolution theology. His position is that science and religious faith are not mutually exclusive (a form of religious naturalism). He preaches that the epic of cosmic, biological, and human evolution, revealed by science, is a basis for an inspiring and meaningful view of our place in the universe and a new approach to religion. Evolution is viewed as a religious spiritual process that is not meaningless blind chance.

== Criticism ==
Geoff Thompson argues that progressive Christianity, as represented by Gretta Vosper and John Shelby Spong, "often over-reaches its arguments". In particular, he concludes that "[i]t is very difficult to see how what [Vosper] proposes needs any church or even the minimalist, idiosyncratic definition of Christianity which she offers".

== Major festivals and conferences ==
- The Greenbelt Festival
- The Wild Goose Festival
- Christianity21 conferences
- The Lion & the Lamb Festival
- The Embrace Festival

== See also ==
- Catholic Worker Movement
- Christian anarchism
- Christian existentialism
- Christian feminism
- Christian humanism
- Christian left
- Christian socialism
- Christian Universalism
- Christian views on poverty and wealth
- Christianity and homosexuality
- Christianity and politics
- Egalitarianism
- Emerging church
- Engaged Spirituality
- Evangelical left
- Free Christians (Britain)
- Fundamentalist–Modernist controversy
- Historical-critical method
- LGBT-affirming Christian denominations
- Living the Questions, curriculum resources for progressive Christians
- Mainline Protestant
- Modernism (Roman Catholicism)
- National Union for Social Justice
- Patheos
- Peace churches
- Political theology
- Postmillennialism
- Postmodern Christianity
- Progressive Adventism
- Progressive Baptists
- The Progressive Christian, magazine published from 1823 to 2011
- Red Letter Christians
- Religious pluralism
- Rerum novarum
- Secular humanism
- Secular religion
- Social justice and injustice
- Queer theology
- Unitarianism
- Unitarian Universalism
- Women's ordination
