= Kensington Renewal Initiative =

The Kensington Renewal Initiative (KRI) is a Philadelphia-based advocacy and community development organization founded by film director, Jamie Moffett. KRI was established to create a program model to rehabilitate blighted properties and dilapidated lots and transforming them into owner occupied homes for the purpose of significantly decreasing crime and drug activity in low income, urban neighborhoods throughout the United States. At the time of KRI’s launch in 2011, the Kensington neighborhood was the poorest in Philadelphia and had the highest rates of vacant property, consequently resulting in the highest rates of violent crime and drug use in Philadelphia. As a result of the collaborative efforts of KRI and its local and state partners, residents of one block in Kensington reported a significant decrease in the volume of criminal activity in the neighborhood in 2013.

== History ==
In 2007, Moffett moved into the Kensington neighborhood to establish his film studio, Jamie Moffett Media Design and Production. Moffett recognized the high levels of drug activity within the vacant house next door to his studio, and also among the hundreds of other vacant lots throughout the neighborhood at large. Moffett discovered that hundreds of these properties were owned by notorious slumlord, Robert (Bob) Coyle. After a failed attempt to purchase the drug-ridden lot from Coyle in 2007, Moffett officially launched the Kensington Renewal Initiative to make an official, determined effort to lessen the crime correlated to the vacant properties by working to rehabilitate the homes and resell them as owner-occupied properties. In 2012, Coyle was indicted and imprisoned, and the Kensington Initiative rehabilitated its first home.

Moffett, his efforts and KRI have been featured on NPR, and NBC Philadelphia, Senator Bob Casey Jr. was a strong supporter in Kensington Renewal Initiative’s effort to promote lower mortgage rates to prospective homeowners in low-income communities of Philadelphia. After a high-profile visit to the Kensington neighborhood during the 2012 Senate race, Sen. Casey submitted a letter to the newly formed US Consumer Financial Protection Bureau, urging them to address the challenges that qualified borrowers encounter in securing mortgages in areas with low property values.

== Purpose ==
Kensington Renewal Initiative’s model for decreasing crime and drug activity in low income, urban neighborhoods takes a three- fold approach:

- Purchase and rehabilitate blighted homes for resell to owner-occupied buyers to rid neighborhoods of abandoned properties used by squatters and drug dealers.
- Partner with organizational investment partners such as Finanta to connect qualified, low income, high credit families to loan opportunities under $50,000 to become homeowners.
- Create community buy-in by organizing neighborhood cleanups, tree and flower planting events and other activities to improve the aesthetic quality of the neighborhood.
