= Imani Barbarin =

American disability rights activist

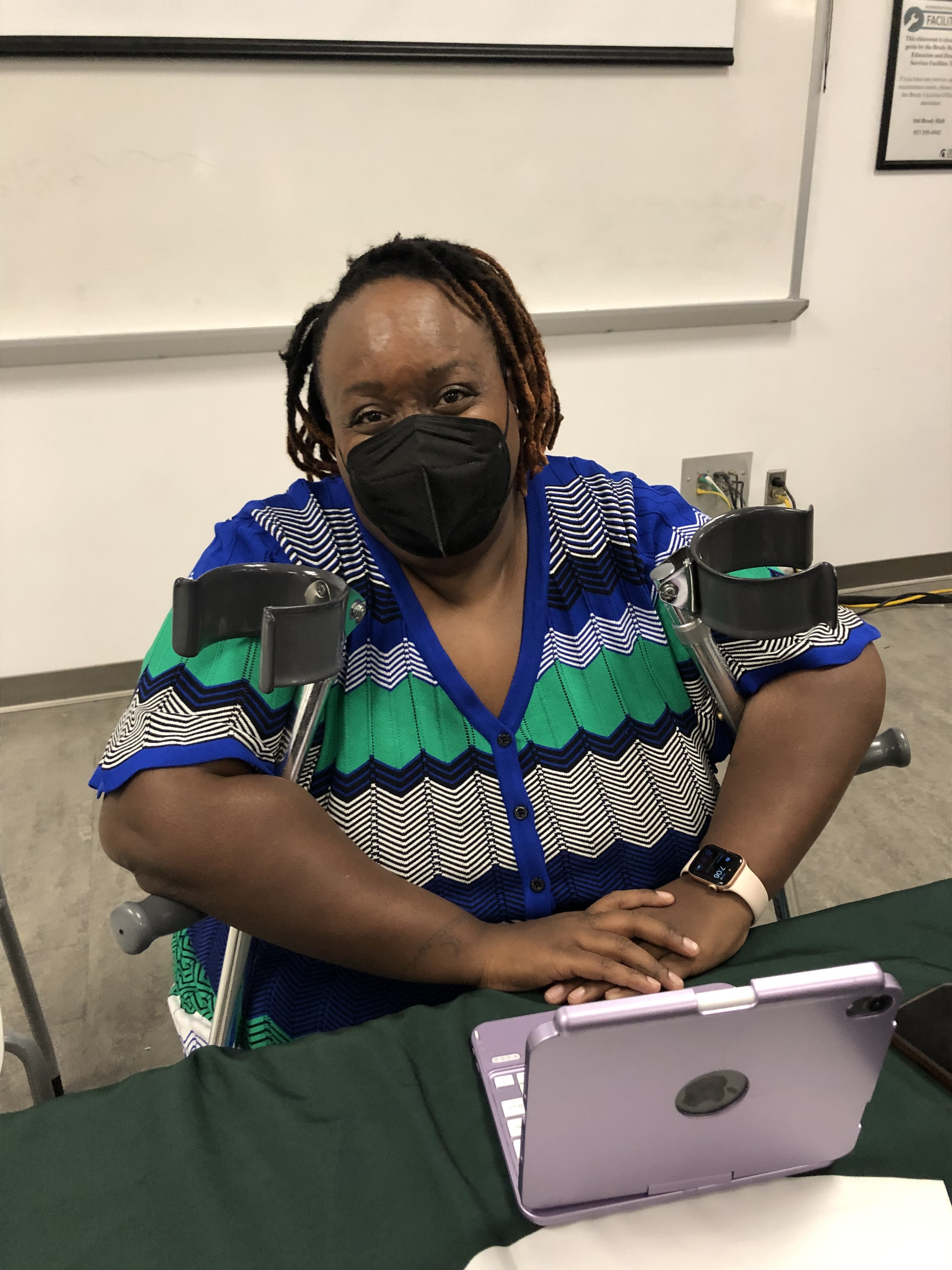
- Imani Barbarin after speaking at Michigan State University in 2024
- Born: March 1990 (age 35–36)
- Occupations: Author; TikToker; public speaker; disability rights activist

TikTok information
- Page: Crutches&Spice ♿️
- Followers: 829.3 K
- Last updated: July 15, 2026
- Website: imanibarbarin.com

Imani Barbarin (born March 1990) is an American writer, public speaker, and disability rights activist who also goes by the username Crutches and Spice. She is active on her website and on social media, such as Instagram, Twitter (X) and TikTok.

== Career ==
In 2014, Barbarin launched the website Crutches and Spice as a space for her to write about her experiences as a disabled Black woman.

=== Social media ===
On Twitter, Barbarin has spearheaded several hashtags to promote discussion of disabled issues and experiences. In 2018 she started #DisTheOscars to call attention to the lack of disabled representation. In 2019 she started #AbledsAreWeird, encouraging disabled people to share their experiences of abled individuals misunderstanding their needs and experiences. In January 2021, she started the hashtag #MyDisabledLifeIsWorthy in response to remarks by former CDC director Rochelle Walensky about the "encouraging" fact that most deaths caused by the omicron variant of COVID-19 were in disabled individuals. Barbarin joined TikTok in 2020, where she began posting both comedic and educational videos. By February 2022 she had 140,000 followers on Twitter and 370,000 followers on TikTok. In late 2022, Barbarin criticized Twitter policy changes after the company's acquisition by Elon Musk.

=== Other work ===
Barbarin works as a communications manager for a disability legal office in Philadelphia. She also writes for online newspapers and magazines and has speaking engagements at universities.

In 2020, Barbarin hosted the five-episode podcast Vote for Access, which investigated the difficulties of voting while disabled. In May 2022 she appeared on MetroFocus to discuss her push to reinstate New York City's mask mandate. In October 2022 she headlined the Midwest Bisexual Lesbian Gay Transgender Asexual College Conference alongside Schuyler Bailar. In January 2023, she was a guest on The Assignment with Audie Cornish during an episode discussing long COVID. In April 2023, she was part of the short film Unlucky in Love for the 2023 Easterseals Disability Film Challenge.

== Personal life ==
Barbarin grew up in a suburb of Philadelphia. She was diagnosed with cerebral palsy at age 2. She attended Eastern University where she earned a degree in creative writing and a minor in French. Barbarin has a masters in communication from American University of Paris. Barbarin is queer.

== Accolades ==
- 2022 – The Root 100 Honoree
