= The Simple Way =

Christian organization in Philadelphia, Pennsylvania, US

- Formation: January 1998
- Founder: Shane Claiborne and five other Eastern University graduates
- Purpose: To emulate Jesus
- Location: Kensington, Philadelphia
- Website: www.thesimpleway.org

The Simple Way is a non-profit in Philadelphia, Pennsylvania, United States.

== History ==
Shane Claiborne and five other Eastern University graduates founded an intentional community when they moved into a terraced house in the neighborhood of Kensington in January 1998. They purposely started the community in the poorest area of the city, which was a place where there were no existing local churches. They did not apply for funding from mission agencies. Since then, the community has transitioned into a local non-profit. Current activities of The Simple Way include planting gardens, running a store, and working for food security in the neighborhood. When a law was passed that prohibited distribution of food on streets in the city, The Simple Way avoided breaking the new law by instead distributing the Eucharist, which is not considered food after it has been blessed. The community is part of the New Monasticism movement.

Singer-songwriter Dar Williams has been affiliated with the community since 1999, and has held a benefit concert to raise money for it. In his book The Way of Jesus: Re-Forming Spiritual Communities in a Post-Church Age, Toby Jones writes that The Simple Way provides "an authentic, albeit human, look at living the way of Jesus". John Avant writes about The Simple Way in his book If God Were Real: A Journey into a Faith That Matters, calling the community "a pretty incredible group".

== Bibliography ==
- Avant, John (2009). If God Were Real: A Journey into a Faith That Matters. Simon & Schuster. ISBN 978-1439100851.
- Cannon, Mae Elise; John M. Perkins (2009). Social Justice Handbook: Small Steps for a Better World. InterVarsity Press. ISBN 978-0830837151.
- Elliot-Hart, Teri (2013). Seong Hyun Park; Aida Besancon Spencer (eds.). "Challenges to Discipleship in the Context of Contemporary Consumer Culture". Reaching for the New Jerusalem: A Biblical and Theological Framework for the City. Wipf and Stock. ISBN 978-1621898191.
- Guzder, Deena (2011). Divine Rebels: American Christian Activists for Social Justice. Chicago Review Press. ISBN 978-1569768709.
- Jones, Toby (2010). The Way of Jesus: Re-Forming Spiritual Communities in a Post-Church Age. Wipf and Stock. ISBN 978-1608991525.
- Mobsby, Ian; Ian Adams (2009). Steven Croft; Ian Mobsby; Stephanie Spellers (eds.). New Monasticism. Church Publishing. ISBN 978-1596272224.
- Sider, Ronald J.; Perkins, John; Tizon, F. Albert (2008). Linking Arms, Linking Lives: How Urban-Suburban Partnerships Can Transform Communities. Baker Publishing Group. ISBN 978-1441201874.
- Sweet, Leonard (2015). From Tablet to Table: Where Community Is Found and Identity Is Formed. NavPress. ISBN 978-1612917801.
- Wilson-Hartgrove, Jonathan (2008). New Monasticism: What It Has to Say to Today's Church. Brazos Press. ISBN 978-1441201362.
