= Jonathan Wilson-Hartgrove =

American Christian preacher and writer

- Citizenship: United States
- Education: Eastern University; Duke Divinity School
- Spouse: Leah Wilson-Hartgrove
- Writing career
- Language: English
- Years active: 2005-present
- Genre: Christian devotional literature
- Subject: New Monasticism
- Website: jonathanwilsonhartgrove.com

Jonathan Wilson-Hartgrove is an American Protestant Christian writer and preacher associated with New Monasticism. Immediately before the 2003 invasion of Iraq, he and his wife, Leah, were members of a Christian peacemaking team that traveled to Iraq to communicate their message to Iraqis that not all American Christians were in favor of the coming Iraq War. Wilson-Hartgrove wrote about this experience in his book To Baghdad and Beyond: How I Got Born Again in Babylon. Also in 2003, he became one of the co-founders of Rutba House, a Christian intentional community in Durham, North Carolina's Walltown Neighborhood. In 2006, he founded the School for Conversion, a popular education center committed to "making surprising friendships possible." He taught workshops there alongside his mentor and freedom teacher, Ann Atwater until she died in 2016. Wilson-Hartgrove has also worked with the Rev. William J. Barber, II to promote public faith for the common good through Moral Mondays, the Poor People's Campaign: A National Call for Moral Revival, and the Center for Public Theology and Public Policy at Yale Divinity School.

In his 2008 book Free to Be Bound: Church Beyond the Color Line (NavPress), Wilson-Hartgrove writes about racism and the central importance of racial reconciliation to Christianity. He co-wrote the 2008 book Becoming the Answer to Our Prayer: Prayer for Ordinary Radicals (InterVarsity Press) with fellow New Monastic Shane Claiborne, and published a book on what new monasticism has to say to the church, New Monasticism (Baker Books). They also collaborated on the popular daily prayer guide Common Prayer: A Liturgy for Ordinary Radicals (Zondervan).

Wilson-Hartgrove wrote God's Economy (Zondervan), published in 2009, and a study of the Benedictine practice of stability, The Wisdom of Stability (Paraclete Press), published in 2010. He published two books in 2012: The Awakening of Hope: Why We Practice a Common Faith (Zondervan) and The Rule of St. Benedict: A Contemporary Paraphrase (Paraclete Press). In 2013, he wrote a book about his experiences with hospitality called Strangers at My Door: A True Story of Finding Jesus in Unexpected Guests. During Holy Week 2015, Wilson-Hartgrove was one of approximately 400 Christian theologians and leaders who signed a public statement arguing that capital punishment in the United States should cease. He has worked closely with the Rev. Dr. William J. Barber, II in Moral Mondays and the Poor People's Campaign: A National Call for Moral Revival and is co-author of The Third Reconstruction: Moral Mondays, Fusion Politics, and the Rise of a New Justice Movement (Beacon Press). After the 2016 election, Wilson-Hartgrove began teaching about the legacy of slaveholder religion in American Christianity and published Reconstructing the Gospel: Finding Freedom from Slaveholder Religion (InterVarsity Press). In 2020, he published Revolution of Values (InterVarsity Press), a book that explores how the religious right taught Americans to misread the Bible as an endorsement of Christian nationalism and invites people of faith to re-read Scripture from the perspective of the poor and marginalized whom Jesus blessed. In 2024 he published White Poverty: How Exposing Myths About Race and Class Can Reconstruct American Democracy (Liveright) with William J. Barber, II.

== Bibliography ==
- Buschart, W. David; Kent Eilers (2015). Theology as Retrieval: Receiving the Past, Renewing the Church. InterVarsity Press. ISBN 978-0830824670.
- Byassee, Jason (2013). Discerning the Body: Searching for Jesus in the World. Wipf and Stock. ISBN 978-1621898788.
- Flanagan, Bernadette; Beverly Lanzetta (2013). Embracing Solitude: Women and New Monasticism. Wipf and Stock. ISBN 978-1606083376.
- Forman, Mary (2009). One Heart, One Soul: Many Communities. Liturgical Press. ISBN 978-0814699256.
- Gorman, Michael J. (2015). Becoming the Gospel: Paul, Participation, and Mission. William B. Eerdmans Publishing Company. ISBN 978-0802868848.
- Harvey, Jennifer (2014). Dear White Christians: For Those Still Longing for Racial Reconciliation. William B. Eerdmans Publishing Company. ISBN 978-0802872074.
- Jacobs, Alan (2010). Wayfaring: Essays Pleasant and Unpleasant. William B. Eerdmans Publishing Company. ISBN 978-0802865687.
