= Joseph T. Bayly =

American author and publishing executive (1920-1986)

Joseph Tate Bayly (5 April 1920 – 16 July 1986) was an American author and publishing executive.

== Early life and education ==
Born in Germantown, Philadelphia, Pennsylvania, Bayly earned his BA at Wheaton College, Illinois, in 1940, and then entered Faith Theological Seminary to gain his BD in 1945. In 1944, Bayly married Mary Lou DeWalt, a classmate at Wheaton College. Bayly was awarded honorary doctorates from Sterling College and Gordon–Conwell Theological Seminary.

== Career ==
Bayly was one of the original signers, in 1973, of the Chicago Declaration of Evangelical Social Concern. This document confessed the failure of evangelical Christianity to confront racism, materialism and injustice as well as acknowledging the fact that they have "encouraged men to prideful domination and women to irresponsible passivity".

He was initial east coast staff director for InterVarsity Christian Fellowship, editor of His magazine, and director of InterVarsity Press.

Bayly also served as president of both the Evangelical Press Association and the National Association of Christian Schools, and as general director of the Christian Medical Society. In addition, he contributed a monthly column to Eternity magazine.

At the time of his death, Bayly was president of David C. Cook Publishing Company of Elgin, Illinois (now located in Colorado Springs, Colorado).

== Personal life and death ==
Bayly was married to Mary Lou Bayly, and together they had seven children, three of whom died in childhood. He died on July 16, 1986 at the Mayo Clinic Hospital in Rochester, Minnesota.

== Legacy ==
Among his published works is The Gospel Blimp, which was adapted for film in 1967 and was also made into a comic book by Spire Christian Comics.

Two of Joseph's sons, David and Timothy, are Presbyterian ministers. Tim Bayly was ordained and served in the Presbyterian Church (USA), eventually transferring with his congregation into the Presbyterian Church in America. David Bayly was ordained and served in the Church of the United Brethren in Christ, later transferring into the Presbyterian Church in America. After twenty years in the PCA, Tim Bayly transferred, along with his congregation, into Evangel Presbytery. David Bayly transferred out of the Presbyterian Church in America into independency.

== Selected bibliography ==
- The Gospel Blimp (1967)
- Congo Crisis (1967)
- Out of My Mind (1970) ISBN 0-8423-4790-9
- The View from a Hearse (1973) ISBN 0-912692-01-4
- Winterflight (1981) ISBN 1-56476-786-8
- Psalms of My Life (2000) ISBN 1-56476-785-X
