= Return to El Salvador =

- Directed by: Jamie Moffett
- Written by: Julia Shields, Betsy Morgan
- Narrated by: Martin Sheen
- Release date: January 1, 2010
- Running time: 68 min
- Country: United States
- Language: English

Return to El Salvador is a 2010 documentary film directed by Philadelphia filmmaker Jamie Moffett and narrated by Martin Sheen. It chronicles the rebuilding of El Salvador in the years after the Salvadoran Civil War, and explores the impact a lasting legacy of violence and unrest has had on those who survived, fled, and are now seeking to return.

== Background ==
The Salvadorian Civil War was a 12-year conflict (from 1980 to 1992) that killed over 70,000 people and displaced nearly one-quarter of the population. The fighting, which took place between the Salvadoran Army and the leftist guerrilla organization, the Farabundo Marti National Liberation Front (FMLN), resulted in civilian deaths as the Salvadoran Army bombed and raided villages thought to be sympathetic to the FMLN. Many of these Salvadoran Army soldiers were trained and supported by the United States military at its School of the Americas (now known as WHINSEC), located in Ft. Benning, Georgia. The Revolutionary Government Junta in power targeted many well-known figures. Óscar Romero was the fourth Archbishop of San Salvador and spoke out against the poverty, social injustice, assassinations, and torture caused by the U.S.-backed El Salvadoran government. He was assassinated on 24 March 1980. Other victims included six Jesuit priests of the Universidad Centroamericana (UCA), their cook, and her daughter were also shot and killed in 1989. The El Salvadoran army had branded the university as the intelligence behind the guerilla army. Later, the military told American advisers that a guerilla operating station had been established at the university. The ensuing raid, which found no evidence of a commend post, resulted in the massacre of the priests and their two female co-workers. In 1991, Colonel Benavides and Lieutenant Mendoza of the El Salvadoran army were found guilty of the crimes. In 1992, a U.N. peace accord formally ended the El Salvadoran Civil War. The ruling government remained conservative until 2009, when Mauricio Funes won the elections to bring the left-wing FMLN into power. Before his entry into politics, Funes gained popularity through his twenty-year career in journalism, working with CNN Español and Canal 12, among other programs.

== Summary ==
Return to El Salvador explores the reconstruction of El Salvador, post-civil war. The film revisits the struggles of the nation and examines what drives over 700 Salvadorans to flee their homeland each day, often risking their lives to illegally enter countries in search of a better life for their families. The film also profiles a number of Salvadorans effected by the civil war. One couple, who fled death threats in the 1980s, finds asylum and a political platform in the United States. The film also follows a different couple who, after escaping the war, returned to El Salvador to work with churches and poor communities.

The film also interviews a family that speaks about their continued hunt for the truth about a murdered anti-mining activist, Marcelo Rivera. Rivera began speaking out against a mining project proposal by the Pacific Rim Company before his death. On June 18, 2009, Rivera's body was found at the bottom of a well. Although the police and attorney general inferred that Rivera had been drinking and was killed by blows to the head from gang members, Rivera's family maintain that he did not drink. The formal autopsy also showed the cause of death to be strangulation, not blunt force trauma. Moffett's film suggests a correlation between the way in which Rivera was killed and the death squad murders of the civil war, suggesting that El Salvadoran history may be repeating itself.

On the official website, Return to El Salvador is described as such:

"[The] film explores the hopes of the Salvadoran people and walks with them in their journey. Return to El Salvador represents the power and audacity of solidarity and challenges North Americans to question the global impact of their government on struggling nations."

== Publicity and screenings ==
The film has been featured in many periodicals and news sites, including Philadelphia City Paper, Washington City Paper, The Toronto Sun, The Kansas City Star, and The Huffington Post. Return to El Salvador has also been highlighted on several television programs and radio stations, including Oprah Radio. The film was screened at the 3rd Philadelphia Independent Film Festival and in other major U.S. cities such as Washington, D.C. and Kansas City. The movie also toured Canada, screening in the cities of Toronto, Ottawa, Mississauga, Halifax, Vancouver, and Edmonton.

== Featuring ==
- Martin Sheen: Narrator
- Hector Antonio Garcia Berrios: Himself
- Dean Brackley: Himself
- Monsenor Rosa Chavez: Herself
- Deysi Chene: Herself
- Maria Guardado: Herself
- Julio Hernandez: Himself
- Dr. Salvador Eduardo Menendez Leal: Himself
- Wilfredo Medrano: Himself
- David Morales: Himself
- Raul Moreno: Himself
- Betsy Morgan: Herself
- Ron Morgan: Himself
- Alex Orantes: Himself
- Ruth Orantes: Herself
- Marina Pena: Herself
- Corinna Ramos: Herself
- Luis Ramos: Himself
- Sonia Ramos: Herself
- Dr. Luz Estrella Rodriguez: Herself
- Oscar Cesar Rodriguez: Himself
- Luis Romero: Himself
- Dr. Claudia Tamara Rivera Schettin: Herself
- Robert E. White: Himself
