= Chris Haw =

American Catholic theologian and professor (born 1981)

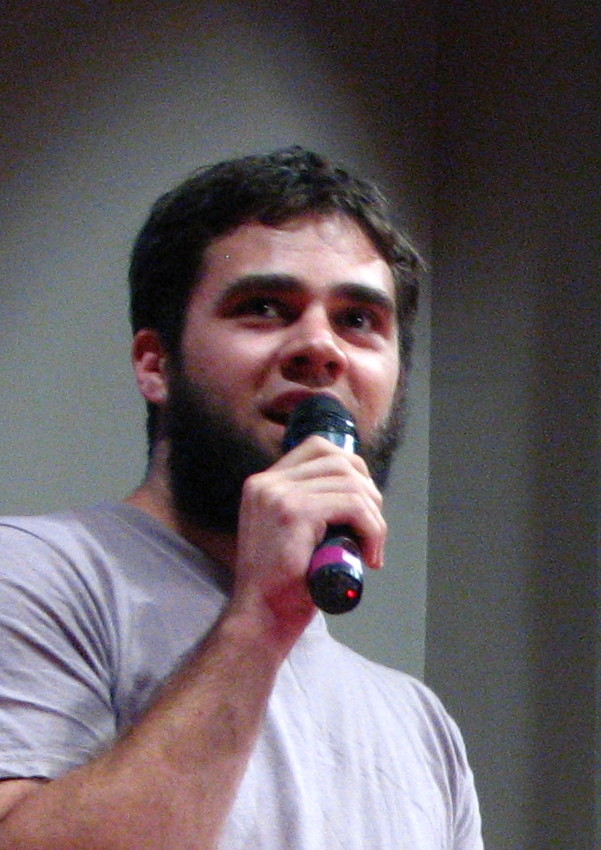
- Haw in 2008
- Born: 1981 (age 44–45); Chicago metropolitan area
- Education: Villanova University
- Occupation: Writer
- Spouse: Cassie Haw
- Children: Simon Haw
- Writing career
- Language: English
- Years active: 2008–present
- Genre: Christian devotional literature
- Subjects: New Monasticism; Self-denial; Social justice
- Notable works: Jesus for President; From Willow Creek to Sacred Heart
- Website: www.chris-haw.com

Chris Haw (born 1981) is an American Catholic theologian and professor.

== Biography ==
Haw was baptized into the Catholic Church and attended Catholic churches as a child until his mother started attending Willow Creek Community Church, after which he began attending there as well.

In 2004, Haw founded Camden Community House, a Christian intentional community in Camden, New Jersey, composed of people who seek to emulate early Christians by being actively involved in their community and by sharing their wealth among the community.

He then studied theology at Villanova University and spent a semester in Belize, studying Christian views on environmentalism.

In 2008, he co-wrote Jesus for President: Politics for Ordinary Radicals with Shane Claiborne, whom he met at Willow Creek.

Haw graduated from Villanova in 2009 with an MA in theology and later studied for a PhD at Notre Dame.

=== Book on reversion to Catholicism ===
From Willow Creek to Sacred Heart
- Author: Chris Haw
- Language: English
- Subject: Catholicism; Evangelicalism; Religious conversion Willow Creek Community Church
- Genre: Autobiography; Christian apologetics Christian devotional literature
- Published: 2012 (Ave Maria Press)
- Publication place: United States
- Pages: 234
- ISBN: 978-1-59471-292-0
- Dewey Decimal: 248.2/42092 B
- LC Class: BX4705.H3337A3 2012

From Willow Creek to Sacred Heart: Rekindling My Love for Catholicism is a book of Christian apologetics by Haw that documents his transitions from Catholicism to evangelicalism and back again. The book was published by Ave Maria Press in 2012. The first half of the book is autobiographical, while the second half is a defense against evangelical criticisms of Catholicism.

William T. Cavanaugh, who teaches Catholic studies at DePaul University, wrote the afterword for the book. In a National Catholic Reporter review, Tom Roberts compares From Willow Creek to Sacred Heart to Kaya Oakes' Radical Reinvention: An Unlikely Return to the Catholic Church, calling them both "very smart books". Fox News Channel interviewed Haw about From Willow Creek to Sacred Heart. In his book Reborn on the Fourth of July: The Challenge of Faith, Patriotism & Conscience, Logan Mehl-Laituri writes about From Willow Creek to Sacred Heart, saying that he "cannot recommend it highly enough". A Publishers Weekly reviewer suggests that the book will interest Protestants and Catholics alike because it provides an opportunity for both groups to learn and reflect on their spiritual lives. LaVonne Neff, in The Christian Century, says that "Haw does an exceptionally fine job of uniting theology, personal narrative and contemporary social realities".

=== Teaching ===
In 2018, Haw was hired as a theology professor at the University of Scranton.

== Personal life ==
Haw and his wife, Cassie, have a son and a daughter.

== Official website ==
http://www.chris-haw.com/
