= The Irresistible Revolution =

2006 book by Shane Claiborne

- Author: Shane Claiborne
- Language: English
- Genre: Non-fiction
- Publisher: Zondervan
- Publication date: 1 February 2006
- Publication place: United States
- Media type: Print (Paperback)
- Pages: 367 pp
- ISBN: 0-310-26630-0

The Irresistible Revolution: Living as an Ordinary Radical is a book by Shane Claiborne published in 2006. It describes and advocates what the author argues to be a truly Christian lifestyle.

== Summary ==
The author draws on his personal experience, including time spent in Calcutta, India with Mother Teresa, a trip with a Christian Peacemaker Team to Iraq during the 2003 US-led bombing campaign, and life in a communal house, The Simple Way, in Philadelphia, to describe the way he feels Christians ought to be living, the ways in which many currently are not, and the ways in which many are beginning to do so, the Revolution referenced in the title. The lifestyle Claiborne proposes rejects materialism and nationalism and emphasizes living in loving and close community with Christians and non-Christian, a voluntary redistribution of wealth along the lines of Early Christianity, and socially and environmentally conscious consumer choices, all based on love for God and love for all humans.

Claiborne's writing style relies heavily on personal anecdotes and quotations from Mother Teresa, Martin Luther King Jr., theologians and writers such as Walter Wink, John Howard Yoder, Francis of Assisi, and C.S. Lewis, as well as The Bible.

The book begins with a foreword by Jim Wallis.
