= Red-Letter Christians =

Non-denominational movement within Christianity

Red-Letter Christians is a non-denominational movement within Evangelical Christianity. "Red-Letter" refers to New Testament verses and parts of verses printed in red ink, to indicate the words attributed to Jesus without the use of quotation marks.

== History ==
The organization was founded by Tony Campolo and Shane Claiborne in 2007 with the aim of bringing together evangelicals who believe in the importance of insisting on issues of social justice mentioned by Jesus (in red in some translations of the Bible). They believe Christians should be paying attention to Jesus's words and example by promoting biblical values such as social justice issues. These issues include the fight against poverty, the defense of peace, building strong families, respecting human rights and welcoming foreigners.

It opened a chapter in the UK in 2019, and the organization had 120 social organizations and partner churches in the United States, the United Kingdom and Chile as of 2020.

== See also ==
- Evangelical left – Christian left movement
- Christian humanism – Type of humanism
- Christian values – Ethics derived from Jesus Christ's ministry
- Christian democracy – Christian socioeconomic model
  - Distributism – Economic theory promoting local control
  - Social credit – Distributive economic theory
- Jesuism – Religious belief
- Jesus Seminar – American biblical research project
- Ministry of Jesus
- New Covenant theology – Belief that Jesus Christ is the central focus of the Bible
- Progressive Christianity – Postmodern theological approach
- Sojourners – Progressive magazine published in the United States
