= Brandon "Scoop B" Robinson =

Sports journalist (born 1985)

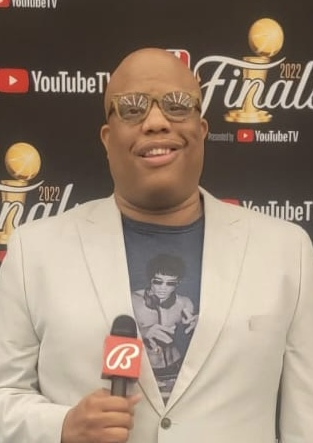
- Robinson in 2023
- Born: May 28, 1985 (age 41); Newark, New Jersey, U.S.
- Education: Hofstra University; Eastern University
- Occupations: Sportswriter, journalist, columnist, sports analyst, editor, podcast host
- Years active: 1997–present
- Known for: Radio, television, journalism
- Website: scoopb.com

Brandon Robinson, known professionally as Brandon "Scoop B" Robinson, is an American television host, executive producer, sportswriter and NBA Insider. He is the co-founder of Scoop B Radio, a media, marketing and production entity. He has been a columnist at CBS and a television analyst at Bally Sports Network.

== Early life and education ==
Born in Newark, New Jersey, Robinson grew up in both Essex County, New Jersey and in the borough of Manhattan in New York City.

He is an alum of Don Bosco Preparatory High School, where he was sports editor of the Ironman newspaper. He completed his Bachelor of Arts (BA) from Eastern University and graduated with a master's degree in journalism from Hofstra University. He was sports editor of Eastern's Waltonian newspaper, and the public address announcer of Eastern's soccer, volleyball, basketball and lacrosse teams.

Robinson's interest in sports began in the 1990s while working in his family's shoe businesses, Men's Walker and The Athlete’s Foot, in Harlem.

== Career ==
Robinson began his career at the age of 12, co-hosting Nets Slammin' Planet on the now-defunct Radio AAHS (later AAHS World Radio).

Over the years, Robinson contributed as a writer to sports and entertainment magazines such as Regal Sports Radio's D & Davis Show, Slam magazine, The Source, Billboard, CBS Local Sports, Respect., Vibe, Jet, and Ebony. He has appeared regularly as a sports contributor on television and radio programming, including Sirius XM radio Arise News, Complex, and ESPN.

After leaving The Source in 2015, he hosted a sports show on CBS Radio called Brown and Scoop, and also served as a sports columnist for the network.

Robinson became managing editor and columnist at Respect magazine, where his writing tackled the intersection of sports, entertainment, lifestyle and politics. In March 2018, he became a senior writer at Basketball Society. He also contributed to Heavy as a senior sports writer.

In May 2021, he joined Bally Sports Network as a National NBA Insider.

== See also ==
- List of people from Harlem
