= Edward R. Dalglish =

American Biblical scholar and professor

Edward Russell Dalglish (1909–2001) was an American Biblical scholar and professor of the Old Testament.

== Education ==
Dalglish earned his Bachelors in 1931 from Columbia University, and his Masters in 1946 from Union Theological Seminary in the City of New York, before earning his Ph.D. from Columbia. He also went on to further postgraduate work at Harvard University, Episcopal Theological Seminary, University of London, and University of Heidelberg.

== Career ==
After pastoring a church for 10 years, Dalglish joined the faculty at Gordon Divinity School in 1946, where he served as professor of religion until 1952. While at Gordon, he was the chair of the committee that founded the Evangelical Theological Society. From 1952 until 1966, Dalglish served as professor of Old Testament and Hebrew at Eastern Baptist Theological Seminary. During this time, he joined the team that originally translated the New American Standard Bible. In 1966, Dalglish joined the faculty at Baylor University, eventually becoming the director of major library acquisitions for Baylor.

In 2000, Dalglish was the recipient of the "Herbert H. Reynolds Retired Faculty Award." He was hospitalized that same year and died the following year.

== Publications ==
- 400 articles in The Interpreter's Dictionary of the Bible (IDB)
- 100 articles in the Wycliffe Bible Dictionary
- Psalm Fifty-One in the Light of Ancient Near Eastern Patternism (1962) ISBN 90-04-00429-7
- The Great Deliverance: Studies in the Book of Exodus (1977) ISBN 0-8054-1214-X
- Jeremiah, Lamentations in Volume 11 of Layman's Bible Book Commentary, with Edward H. Dalglish (1983) ISBN 0-8054-1181-X
