= Becky Garrison =

American religious satirist and author

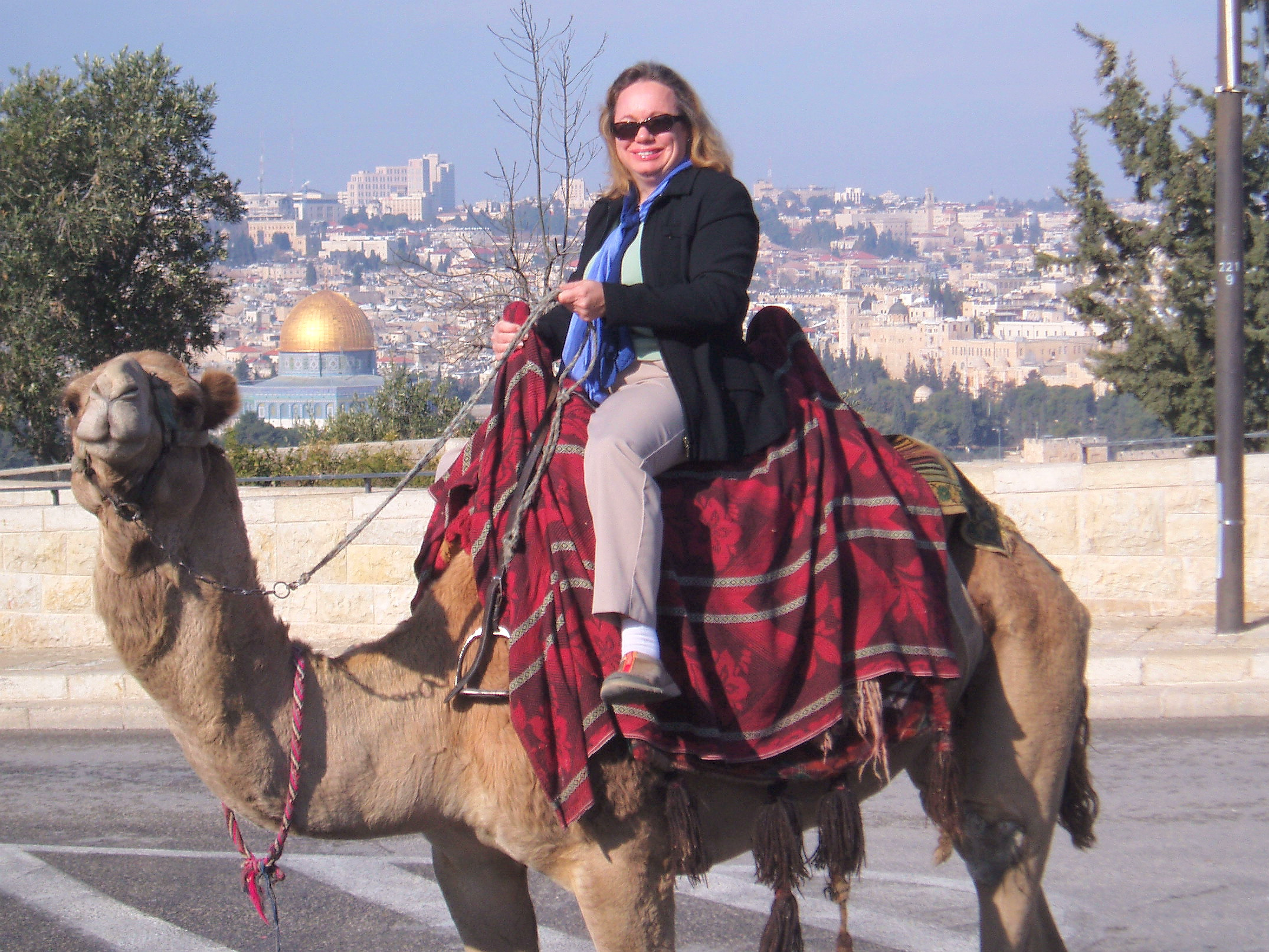
- Garrison, photographed in 2007
- Occupation: Writer
- Writing career
- Subject: religion
- Website: www.beckygarrison.com

Becky Garrison is an American author, journalist, religious satirist and storyteller. She is a 2013 recipient of a Knight Grant for Reporting on Religion and American Public Life. She was a senior contributing editor for The Wittenburg Door, from 1994 to 2008. With the site's relaunch in 2021, she serves on the Door's Board of Directors and contributes to The Door's Substack. Additional recent writing credits include work for The Alcohol Professor, Edible Seattle, Northwest Travel & Life, Spirituality & HealthOnly Sky Media, SIP, and The Grapevine Magazine (also Beverage Master). She is a member of the Authors Guild.

== Education ==
Garrison earned a bachelor's degree in theater arts at Wake Forest University. She received an M.Div. from Yale Divinity School and an M.S.W. from Columbia University.

== Books ==
- Gaslighting for God: A Satirical Guide to Saving Yourself from Spiritual Narcissists. Lake Drive Books. ISBN 978-1957687711. January 27, 2026.
- Jesus Died for This?: A Satirist Searches for the Risen Christ. Lake Drive Books. ISBN 9781957687575. 2025.
- Washington Distilled: A History. The History Press. 2024.
- Love, Always: Partners of Trans People on Intimacy, Challenge and Resilience, editor. Transgress Press. 2015. ISBN 978-0986084409.
- Roger Williams's Little Book of Virtues. Wipf & Stock. 2020. ISBN 978-1532696541.
- Ancient Future Disciples: Meeting Jesus in Mission-Shaped Ministries. Seabury Books. 2011. ISBN 978-1-59627-231-6.
- Starting from Zero with $0: Building Mission-Shaped Ministries on a Shoestring. Seabury Books. 2010. ISBN 978-1-59627-125-8.
- The New Atheist Crusaders and Their Unholy Grail. Thomas Nelson. 2008. ISBN 978-0-8499-1972-5.
- Rising from the Ashes: Rethinking Church. Seabury Books. 2007. ISBN 978-1-59627-062-6.
- Red and Blue God, Black and Blue Church. Jossey-Bass. 2006. ISBN 978-1-118-10411-8.
