= Progressive Christianity (organization) =

Organization

- Formation: 1996
- Headquarters: Gig Harbor, Washington
- Region served: United States
- Website: progressivechristianity.org

Progressive Christianity, formerly known as The Center for Progressive Christianity (TCPC), is an ecumenical Progressive Christian network of affiliated congregations, informal groups, and individuals in United States.

== History ==
It was founded in 1996 by retired Episcopal priest James Rowe Adams in Cambridge, Massachusetts.

In 2010, it was renamed Progressive Christianity.

== Beliefs ==
Most affiliates generally view religious belief as a process or journey—a searching for truth rather than establishing truth. Liberal Christians or post-Christians who stress justice and tolerance above creeds may also be attracted to the movement. The Center for Progressive Christianity has also during its growth with the progressive Christian movement in the United States inspired an offshoot in the British Progressive Christianity Network.

== Criticism ==
More conservative Christian organizations and movements have singled out Progressive Christianity for criticism on theological grounds. Other criticism is politically focused coming from members of the Christian right who disagree with socially liberal aspects of the organization's political stances. Albert Mohler president of the Southern Baptist Theological Seminary has said of Progressive Christianity, "Christians should see The Center for Progressive Christianity, not as posing a threat to Christianity itself, but as exposing the basic hatred of biblical truth that drives those on the theological left."

== See also ==
- Progressive Christianity
