= Bart Campolo =

American writer

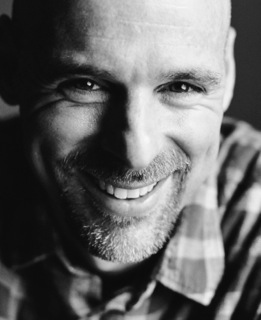
- Bart Campolo 2010
- Born: April 2, 1963 (age 63); Philadelphia, Pennsylvania, U.S.
- Education: Haverford College; Brown University (BA)
- Occupations: Author, podcaster, public speaker, chaplain
- Spouse: Marty Thorpe Campolo
- Relatives: Tony Campolo (father)
- Writing career
- Subjects: Humanism, religion
- Website: bartcampolo.org

Bart Campolo (born April 2, 1963) is an American humanist speaker and writer. He is the son of Tony Campolo, and was a pastor before transitioning from Christianity to secular humanism. Campolo is the co-founder of Mission Year and the author of several books including Kingdom Works: True Stories of God and His People in Inner City America and Things We Wish We Had Said, which he co-wrote with his father. His most recent book, Why I Left, Why I Stayed, also co-written with his father, is a reflection on both men's "spiritual odysseys and how they evolved when their paths diverged." He was the first Humanist Chaplain at the University of Southern California.

== Early life and education ==
Bart Campolo was born April 2, 1963, in Philadelphia. He was named for the Swiss Reformed theologian Karl Barth. Campolo attended Haverford College before completing a B.A. in Religious Studies from Brown University.

== Ministry work ==
In 1999, Campolo and his wife, Marty, founded Mission Year, an urban Christian ministry program. It was born out of the merger of their first organization, Kingdomworks, and Campolo's father's Evangelical Association for the Promotion of Education.

Following a cycling accident during the summer of 2011, Campolo announced that he no longer believed in God and has become a secular humanist. Campolo decided that "He’d help [people] accept that we’re all going to die, that this life is all there is and that therefore we have to make the most of our brief, glorious time on earth." He became the first Humanist chaplain at the University of Southern California.

Campolo gave a talk at the first 5 Talent Academy teaching event in Richmond, VA, on October 1, 2009.

Campolo has spoken at several atheist and secular events including Atheists United, Houston Oasis, Atheist Community of San Jose, Secular Student Alliance, and Sunday Assembly Los Angeles.

== Writing and religious commentary ==
Bart Campolo sparked controversy after publishing an article in The Journal of Student Ministries (in the September/October 2006 issue) titled "The Limits of God's Grace". This article, which argues that God is not currently in control of the universe and will eventually utterly triumph over evil, was perceived as heretical by evangelical Christians, most notably by Christianity Today, who drew comparisons between Campolo and Ivan Karamazov.

Campolo engaged in conversations with his evangelical father after becoming a secular humanist. They co-authored a book exploring the issues at the center of these conversations, and a documentary film (Leaving My Father's Faith) was released in 2018 which features the conversations between them and tell the story of Bart's journey out of faith.

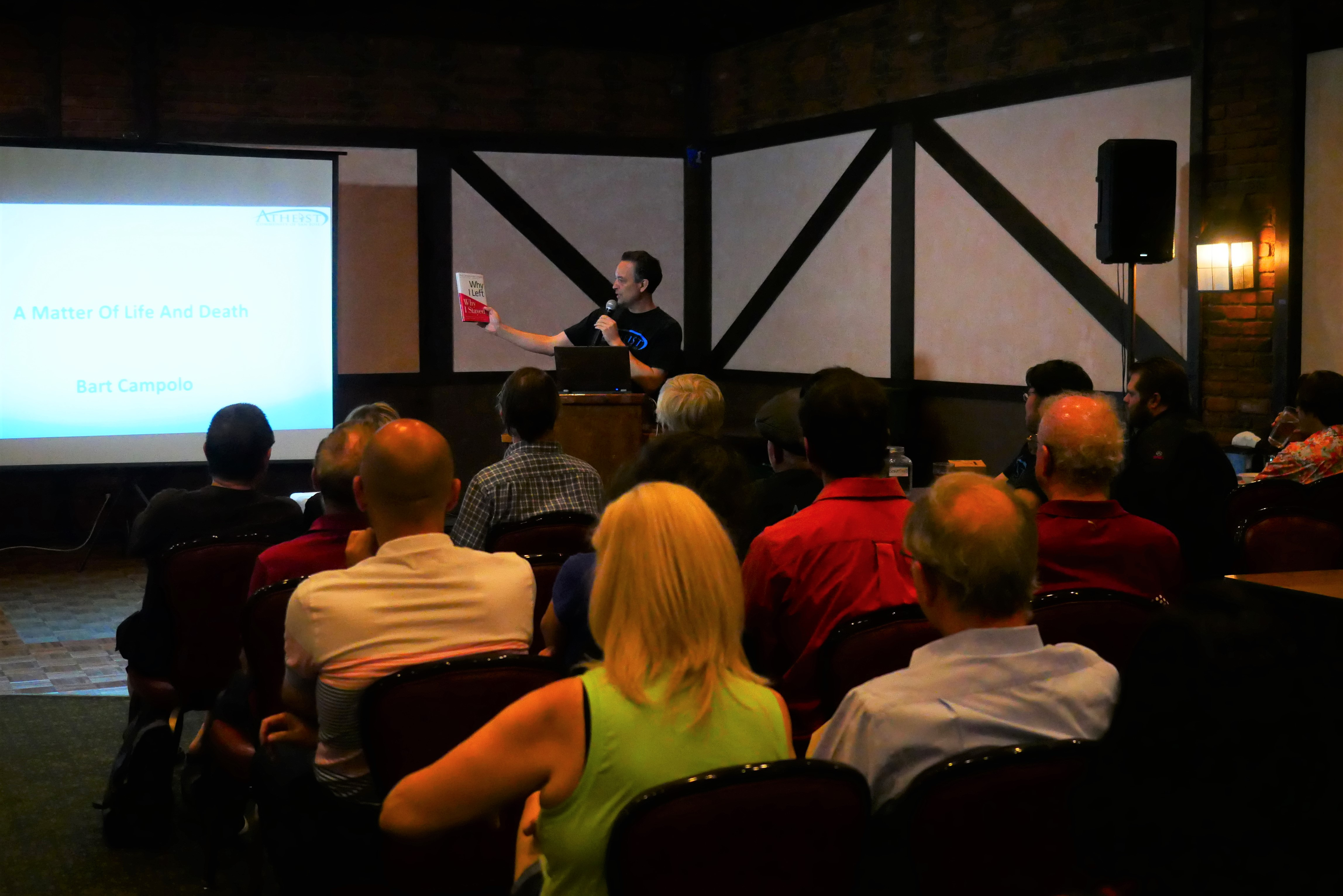
Campolo lecture to the Atheist Community of San Jose

Campolo is the host of the Humanize Me! podcast, first released on February 1, 2016. The podcast centers around encouraging people to help others selflessly. As of April 2018, Campolo has published 65 episodes of Humanize Me!

== Published works ==
- Anthony Campolo; Bart Campolo (Aug 1989). Things We Wish We Had Said: Reflections of a Father and His Grown Son (1st ed.). Dallas: Word Pub. ISBN 9780849906855.
- Bart Campolo (2000). Kingdom Works: True Stories about God and His People in Inner City America. Ann Arbor, Michigan: Servant Publications. ISBN 9781569551950.
- Bart Campolo (Feb 2001). Kingdom Works: True Stories about God and His People in Inner City America. Ann Arbor, Michigan: Vine Books. ISBN 9781569551950.
- Bart Campolo (Sep 2006). "The Limits of God's Grace" (PDF). The Journal of Student Ministries. Archived from the original on 19 October 2007.
- Anthony Campolo; Bart Campolo (21 Feb 2017). Why I Left, Why I Stayed: Conversations on Christianity Between an Evangelical Father and His Humanist Son. New York: HarperOne. ISBN 9780062415370.
