= Palmer Theological Seminary =

Baptist seminary in St. Davids, Pennsylvania, U.S.

Coordinates: 40.0533°N 75.3689°W

- Former name: Eastern Baptist Theological Seminary
- Motto in English: "The whole gospel, for the whole world, through whole persons."
- Type: Private
- Established: 1925
- Parent institution: Eastern University
- Affiliations: American Baptist Churches USA
- Provost: Kenton Sparks
- Dean: Kimberlee A. Johnson
- Academic staff: 5
- Students: 218 (126.70 FTE)
- Location: St. Davids, Pennsylvania, United States
- Website: palmerseminary.edu

Palmer Theological Seminary is a Baptist seminary in St. Davids, Pennsylvania. It is affiliated with the American Baptist Churches USA. It was founded in 1925 as Eastern Baptist Theological Seminary. Its parent institution is Eastern University.

== History ==
The seminar was founded as Eastern Baptist Theological Seminary in 1925 in Philadelphia by six Conservative Baptist ministers from the American Baptist Publication Society. In 1932, a collegiate department was founded. Originally located on Rittenhouse Square, it moved in 1940 to Wynnewood, Pennsylvania, just across the street from the city boundary.

The seminary originally established a collegiate division to prepare some students for the academic rigor of seminary-level courses. This evolved in 1952 into Eastern Baptist College, since 2002 Eastern University in St. Davids, Pennsylvania near Valley Forge and further west on the Philadelphia Main Line from Philadelphia. In 2004, Eastern Baptist Theological Seminary re-merged with Eastern University, now as a subsidiary. The following year, the seminary changed its name to Palmer Theological Seminary in honor of its longest serving president (1936–48), Gordon Palmer. In 2010, the University also established the Smith School of Christian Ministries to oversee certain programs.

In 2012, the seminary moved from the Wynnewood campus to an interim location at the American Baptist Missions Center in nearby King of Prussia, Pennsylvania. In June 2016, the seminary moved to the main campus of Eastern University in St. Davids, Pennsylvania.

Over the years, the seminary has combined evangelical theology with the affirmation of women in ministry and commitment to social justice and ethnic diversity. From the beginning, the Seminary welcomed female students. The Seminary continues to affirm its founding motto, "The Whole Gospel for the Whole World."

== Musical discoveries at the seminary ==
In July 2005, an 80-page Beethoven manuscript of a piano four hands version of the Grosse Fugue was discovered in the library archives by one of the librarians. The manuscript was authenticated by Jeffrey Kallberg at the University of Pennsylvania and by Stephen Roe, head of Sotheby's Manuscript Department. Lost from view for well over 100 years, it is thought by some to be one of the most important musicological finds in recent years. The event paralleled the earlier find on July 31, 1990, of a Mozart manuscript, which had been donated to the seminary in 1951 by Marguerite Treat Doane (daughter of noted hymnist William Howard Doane). It was rediscovered along with some lesser manuscripts of the same period. The Beethoven manuscript was auctioned by Sotheby's in London on December 1, 2005 for US$1.72 million to an anonymous bidder later revealed to be Bruce Kovner.

== Notable faculty and alumni ==
- Ron Sider, professor and founder of Evangelicals for Social Action
- Craig Keener, professor and author of the bestselling IVP Bible Background Commentary (New Testament)
- Barry Black, alumnus and United States Senate Chaplain
- Bernard Ramm, alumnus, author, theologian, professor
- Carl F. H. Henry, evangelical theologian, author, first editor-in-chief of Christianity Today
- Tony Campolo, alumnus, speaker, bestselling author, and social activist
- Michael A. O'Donnell, alumnus, speaker, and author
- Thaddeus Kirkland, Mayor of Chester, Pennsylvania and former Pennsylvania State Representative
- Jay Smith, Christian apologist
- Edward R. Dalglish, Old Testament Teacher,
- Gaddala Solomon, a student of Edward R. Dalglish and Baptist Pastor from India
