= The Chicago Declaration of Evangelical Social Concern =

1973 document

"The Chicago Declaration of Evangelical Social Concern" is a document drafted in 1973 by several evangelical faith leaders, and signed by 53 signatories. Concerned with what they saw as a diversion between Christian faith and a commitment to social justice, the "Chicago Declaration" was written as a call to reject racism, economic materialism, economic inequality, militarism, and sexism. Under the leadership of Ron Sider, The "Chicago Declaration" became the founding document for Christians for Social Action (formerly "Evangelicals for Social Action"), a think tank which seeks to develop biblical solutions to social and economic problems through incubating programs that operate at the intersection of faith and social justice.

== History ==
At the first Calvin College conference on politics that Paul B. Henry organized in the spring of 1973, several organizers, including David Moberg, Rufus Jones, and Paul Henry, decided to call a weekend workshop over Thanksgiving, 1973. The committee invited a broad range of evangelical leaders to come and talk about the need for strengthening evangelical social concern. Nearly forty individuals attended: older evangelicals like Carl F. H. Henry, Frank Gaebelein; younger evangelicals like Jim Wallis, John Perkins, Sharon Gallagher, Rich Mouw, and Ron Sider. Perhaps fittingly, they held their meeting at the YMCA on Wabash Avenue in Chicago.

The assembled individuals wrote and signed "The Chicago Declaration of Evangelical Social Concern", confessing the failure of evangelical Christianity to confront injustice, racism, and discrimination against women, and pledging to do better.

"The Chicago Declaration of Evangelical Social Concern" became the founding document for Evangelicals for Social Action, which was founded in 1974.

Dick Ostling of Time magazine wrote that it was probably the first time in the 20th century that forty evangelical leaders spent a whole weekend discussing social action. Writing for the Chicago Sun Times, Roy Larson declared that someday, ecclesiastical historians would write that "the most significant church-related event of 1973" occurred at this gathering.

As Christianity Today noted on the 30th anniversary of the declaration, the conference's stated purpose wouldn't register as surprising today, when evangelicals from all different political stripes agree that at least some form of social justice is a central tenet of the Christian faith. But "...Thirty years ago, only a frustrated minority—like those at the Chicago meeting—thought so..."

== Signatories ==
- John F. Alexander
- Joseph Bayly
- Ruth L. Bentley
- William Bentley
- Dale Brown
- James C. Cross
- Donald Dayton
- Roger Dewey
- James Dunn
- Daniel Ebersole
- Samuel Escobar
- Warren C. Falcon
- Frank Gaebelein
- Sharon Gallagher
- Theodore E. Gannon
- Art Gish
- Vernon Grounds
- Nancy Hardesty
- Carl F. H. Henry
- Paul B. Henry
- Clarence Hilliard
- Walden Howard
- Rufus Jones
- Robert Tad Lehe
- William Leslie
- C. T. McIntire
- Wes Michaelson
- David O. Moberg
- Stephen Mott
- Richard Mouw
- David Nelson
- F. Burton Nelson
- William Pannell
- John M. Perkins
- William Petersen
- Richard Pierard
- Wyn Wright Potter
- Ron Potter
- Bernard Ramm
- Paul Rees
- Boyd Reese
- Joe Roos
- James Robert Ross
- Eunice Schatz
- Ronald J. Sider
- Donna Simmons
- Lewis Smedes
- Foy Valentine
- Marlin Van Elderen
- Jim Wallis
- Robert E. Webber
- Merold Westphal
- John Howard Yoder
