= Self-denial =

Act or mindset of putting things above one's own needs

Self-denial (related but different from self-abnegation or self-sacrifice) is an act of letting go of the self as with altruistic abstinence – the willingness to forgo personal pleasures or undergo personal trials in the pursuit of the increased good of another. Various religions and cultures take differing views of self-denial, some considering it a positive trait and others considering it a negative one. According to some Protestants, self-denial is considered a superhuman virtue only obtainable through Jesus. Some critics of self-denial suggest that self-denial can lead to self-hatred.

== Positive effects ==
There is evidence that short-term fasting (denying oneself food temporarily) can have positive effects on health. More broadly, self-denial has also been linked to inhibitory control and emotional self-regulation, which research suggests can be of benefit. Similarly, just as scarcity can lead people to focus on enjoying an experience more deeply, self-denial can enhance appreciation. This is particularly relevant because people tend to grow accustomed to material goods through hedonic adaptation, making them less likely to savor everyday pleasures.

== Negative effects ==
Others argue self-denial involves avoidance and holding back of happiness and pleasurable experiences from oneself that is only damaging to other people. Some argue it is a form of micro-suicide because it is threatening to an individual's physical health, emotional well-being, or personal goals.

== Religion and self-denial ==
Self-denial can constitute an important element of religious practice in various belief systems. An exemplification is the self-denial advocated by several Christian confessions where it is believed to be a means of reaching happiness and a deeper religious understanding, sometimes described as 'becoming a true follower of Christ'. The foundation of self-denial in the Christian context is based on the recognition of a higher God-given will, which the Christian practitioner chooses to adhere to, and prioritize over his or her own will or desires. This can in daily life be expressed by renunciation of certain physically pleasurable, yet from a religious stand-point inappropriate activities, sometimes referred to as 'desires of the flesh', which e.g. could entail certain sexual practices and over-indulgent eating or drinking. In the Christian faith, Jesus is often mentioned as a positive example of self-denial, both in relation to the deeds performed during his life, as well as the sacrifice attributed to his death.

== See also ==
- Altruistic suicide
- Asceticism
- Atlas personality
- Generosity
- Human sacrifice
- John 15 (Section 13)
- Journey of self-discovery
