= Ron Sider =

Canadian-American theologian (1939–2022)

- Born: September 17, 1939; Stevensville, Ontario, Canada
- Died: July 27, 2022 (aged 82)
- Education: University of Waterloo; Yale University
- Occupations: Theologian, activist

Ronald James Sider (September 17, 1939 – July 27, 2022) was a Canadian-born American theologian and social activist. He was the founder of Evangelicals for Social Action, an evangelical left think tank.

Sider was a founding board member of the National Religious Partnership for the Environment. He was the Distinguished Professor of Theology, Holistic Ministry and Public Policy at Palmer Theological Seminary in St. Davids, Pennsylvania.

== Early life and education ==
Sider was born on 17 September 1939 in Stevensville, Ontario, to Ida Cline and James Cider, a farmer and Brethren in Christ pastor. His experience at church initiated his interest in social activism. Sider graduated from secondary school at Niagara Christian College (Now Niagara Christian Collegiate) in Fort Erie, Ontario, in 1953 and became the first in his family to go to college. Sider attended the Waterloo Lutheran University, in Waterloo, Ontario, and received a BA in European history in 1962. While at Waterloo, he joined InterVarsity Christian Fellowship and set his sights on a career in academia.

== Career ==
Upon graduating from Yale University with an M.A. (history, 1963), B.D. (divinity, 1967), and PhD (history, 1969), he expected to teach early modern European history on secular university campuses, and continue his Christian apologetic work for IVCF. In 1968, Sider accepted an invitation from Messiah College to teach at its newly opened Philadelphia Campus in North Philadelphia.

The racism, poverty, and evangelical indifference he observed at close hand made a deep impression that led him to write the book, Rich Christians in an Age of Hunger.

What Sider saw as the injustice of poor, majority-minority urban neighborhoods motivated him to work toward developing a biblical response to social injustice. He brought together a network of similarly concerned evangelicals, which in 1973 became the Thanksgiving Workshop on Evangelical Social Concern. It was this conference that issued The Chicago Declaration of Evangelical Social Concern. Twenty years later, a similar gathering of evangelical leaders resulted in the Chicago Declaration II: A Call for Evangelical Renewal. In 2004 he was a signatory of the "Confessing Christ in a World of Violence" document.

By 1984 he had become a member of Oxford Circle Mennonite Church, Philadelphia, and spoke at the World Mennonite Conference on peacekeeping where he advocated a Christian pacifist perspective.

Sider added his signature to a full-page advertisement in the December 5, 2008, edition of The New York Times, which condemned violence and intimidation against religious institutions and their followers following the passage of Proposition 8. The ad emphasized that "violence and intimidation are always wrong, whether the victims are believers, gay people, or anyone else." Alongside him, twelve other religious and human rights activists from various faiths also signed the ad, acknowledging their differences on key moral and legal issues, including Proposition 8.

== Publications ==
Sider published over 30 books and wrote over 100 articles in both religious and secular magazines on a variety of topics including the importance of caring for creation as part of biblical discipleship.

In 1977, Sider's Rich Christians in an Age of Hunger, was published. Hailed by Christianity Today as one of the one hundred most influential books in religion in the 20th century, it went on to sell over 400,000 copies in many languages. He later authored Good News Good Works (published by Baker Book House), a call to the church to embrace evangelical left beliefs. Its companion book tells stories about ministries that brought both evangelism and social transformation together.

Completely Pro-Life, published in the mid-1980s, calls on Christians to take a consistent life ethic opposing abortion, capital punishment, nuclear weapons, hunger, and other conditions that Sider sees as anti-life. Cup of Water, Bread of Life was published in 1994. Living Like Jesus (1999) has been called Sider's Mere Christianity. Just Generosity: A New Vision for Overcoming Poverty in America (1999, 2007) offered a vision for reducing poverty in the United States. Churches That Make a Difference (2002) with Phil Olson and Heidi Rolland Unruh provided concrete help to local congregations seeking to combine evangelism and social ministry. Sider's later publications included Fixing the Moral Deficit: A Balanced Way to Balance the Budget (2012); Just Politics: A Guide for Christian Engagement (2012); The Early Church on Killing: A Comprehensive Sourcebook on War, Abortion, and Capital Punishment (2012); The Spiritual Danger of Donald Trump: 30 Evangelical Christians on Justice, Truth, and Moral Integrity (2020).

== Ecumenical relations ==
In August 2009, Sider signed a public statement encouraging all Christians to read, wrestle with, and respond to Caritas in Veritate, the social encyclical by Pope Benedict XVI. Later that year, he also gave his approval to the Manhattan Declaration, calling on Christians not to comply with rules and laws permitting abortion, same-sex marriage and other matters that go against their religious consciences.

== Criticism ==
Sider's opponents typically criticize his ideas as consisting of bad theology and bad economics. The most thorough critiques come from the American Christian right, specifically from Christian Reconstructionists. David Chilton's book, Productive Christians in an Age of Guilt Manipulators (1986), with a foreword by Gary North, argues that Sider's book takes a position contrary to the biblical teachings on economics, poverty, and giving, and that the economic model it provides is untenable.

Sider significantly revised the book for the twentieth anniversary edition, and, in an interview with Christianity Today magazine said, "I admit, though, that I didn't know a great deal of economics when I wrote the first edition of Rich Christians. In the meantime, I've learned considerably more, and I've changed some things as a result of that. For example, in the new, twentieth-anniversary edition, I say more explicitly that when the choice is democratic capitalism or communism, I favor the democratic political order and market economies."

== Family ==
Sider was the child of a Canadian Brethren in Christ pastor. He attended Oxford Circle Mennonite Church, was the father of three and lived in Lansdale, Pennsylvania, with his wife Arbutus, a retired family counselor. They celebrated their 50th wedding anniversary in 2011, and they had six granddaughters. Sider's son Theodore is a tenured professor of philosophy at Rutgers who has published over 50 scholarly articles and three books with Oxford University Press.

== See also ==
- List of University of Waterloo people
