= Shane Claiborne =

American Christian organization founder and activist

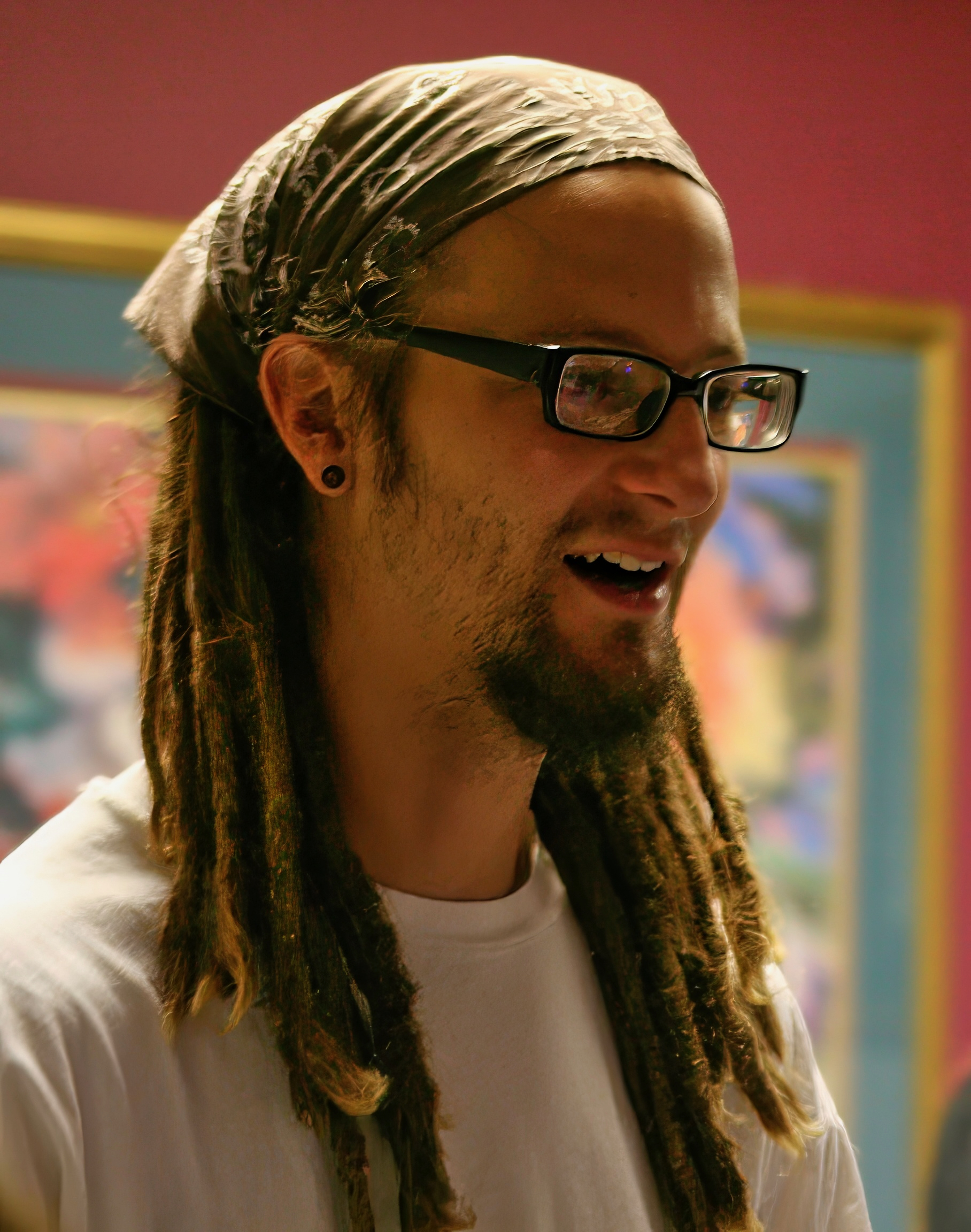
- Claiborne in 2008
- Born: Shane Claiborne; July 11, 1975 (age 51); East Tennessee, U.S.
- Occupations: Founder, writer, organizational leader, activist
- Spouse: Katie Jo Brotherton (m. 2011)
- Writing career
- Language: English
- Notable work: The Irresistible Revolution (2006)
- Movement: New Monastic movement
- Website: shaneclaiborne.com

Shane Claiborne (born July 11, 1975) is an American evangelical Christian and founder, an author and organizational leader. He is one of the founders of the non-profit organization, The Simple Way, in Philadelphia, Pennsylvania, cofounder of the Red-Letter Christians, and has been described as a founder, as well, of the New Monastic movement. Moreover, Claiborne is referred to in the press as an activist, given his advocacy for nonviolence and service to the poor. Among other writings, he is the author of the book, The Irresistible Revolution: Living as an Ordinary Radical (2006).

== Early life and education ==
Claiborne was born July 11, 1975, and grew up in Maryville, Tennessee. His father, who was a Vietnam War veteran, died when Shane was 9 years old. During his childhood, he attended a Methodist church. After being invited to a Pentecostal church by high school friends, he became a Christian and was baptized. He studied sociology and youth ministry at Eastern University and obtained a Bachelor of Arts in 1997.

During his studies, Claiborne worked alongside Mother Teresa during a 10-week term in Calcutta. He has written about how his work with Mother Teresa impacted him and made him realize the need to support a consistent life ethic, to protect all human life from conception to natural death. He spent three weeks in Baghdad with the Iraq Peace Team (IPT), a project of Voices in the Wilderness and Christian Peacemaker Teams. He was witness to the military bombardment of Baghdad as well as the militarized areas between Baghdad and Amman. As a member of IPT, Claiborne took daily trips to sites where there had been bombings, visited hospitals and families, and attended worship services during the war.

== Career ==
After his studies, he reports in interview that he served at Willow Creek Community Church in Chicago. He went on to found The Simple Way—"a small organization supporting neighbors in building a neighborhood where... all belong and thrive"—in 1998, with Joe Strife, Jamie Moffet, Brooke Sexton, and Michelle and Michael Brix, fellow graduates of Eastern University, in Kensington, Philadelphia.

He is a board member for the nationwide Christian Community Development Association. In 2006, he published The Irresistible Revolution: Living as an Ordinary Radical, a plea for Christian voluntary simplicity and social justice. With Tony Campolo, he founded Red-Letter Christians in 2007, aiming to bring together evangelicals who believe in the importance of insisting on issues of social justice mentioned by Jesus, that name deriving from a convention of printing the words of Jesus in red ink in some Bible editions.

On June 20, 2007, a seven-alarm fire at the abandoned warehouse across the street destroyed The Simple Way Community Center where Claiborne lived. He lost all of his possessions in the fire. The Simple Way immediately set up funds to accept donations to help those who lost their homes in the fire.

In June 2008, with Chris Haw, he visited churches and community centers in cities across the United States in a refurbished used vegetable oil fuel school bus, labeled "Jesus for President", to give talks on Christian social justice. In September, they released the book Jesus for President: Politics for Ordinary Radicals. In 2008, he was featured in the documentary The Ordinary Radicals. He co-directed the three volume Another World is Possible DVD series. Claiborne wrote the foreword to Ben Lowe's 2009 book Green Revolution: Coming Together to Care for Creation.

In 2011 he has appeared as both a guest and co-host of the TV show Red-Letter Christians with Tony Campolo. That year also, he declared his unwillingness to pay taxes to fund U.S. military activity. He withheld a portion of his income taxes meant to correspond to the percentage of the federal budget spent on the military, donating that money instead to charity. He wrote a public letter to the Internal Revenue Service to explain his decision. On January 26, 2016, he released the book Executing Grace: How the Death Penalty Killed Jesus and Why It's Killing Us. It makes a case for the abolition of the death penalty through social and spiritual arguments.

In 2023, he published the book Rethinking Life: Embracing the Sacredness of Every Person, a book that calls for extending the Christian definition of the "pro-life" movement to issues other than the fight against abortion, such as gun violence, poverty, the death penalty and openness to immigration.

== Published works ==
- Beating Guns: Hope for People Who Are Weary of Violence, with Michael Martin (Grand Rapids: Brazos Press, 2019) ISBN 978-1-58-743413-6
- Executing Grace - How the Death Penalty Killed Jesus and Why It's Killing Us (HarperCollins, 2016) ISBN 978-0-06-234737-4
- The Irresistible Revolution - Updated and Expanded 10th Anniversary Edition (Grand Rapids: Zondervan, 2016) ISBN 0-310-34370-4
- Common Prayer: A Liturgy for Ordinary Radicals, with Jonathan Wilson-Hartgrove and Enuma Okoro (Grand Rapids: Zondervan, 2010) ISBN 0-310-32619-2
- "What If Jesus Meant All That Stuff?" (Esquire Magazine, November 18, 2009)
- Follow Me To Freedom: Leading and Following as an Ordinary Radical, with John Perkins (Regal Books, 2009) ISBN 0-8307-5120-3
- Jesus for President: Politics for Ordinary Radicals, with Chris Haw (Grand Rapids: Zondervan, 2008) ISBN 0-310-27842-2
- Becoming the Answer to Our Prayers: Prayer for Ordinary Radicals, with Jonathan Wilson-Hartgrove (InterVarsity, 2008) ISBN 0-8308-3622-5
- The Irresistible Revolution: Living as an Ordinary Radical (Grand Rapids: Zondervan, 2006) ISBN 0-310-26630-0
- Iraq Journal 2003 (Doulos Christou, 2006) ISBN 0-9744796-7-5

== Awards and recognition ==
In 2010, Claiborne received an honorary doctorate from Eastern University.

== Personal life ==
As of January 2020, Claiborne was stating to reporters that he was a member of an Anabaptist church.

Claiborne married Katie Jo Brotherton on May 7, 2011.

== See also ==
- Simple living
