= Tony Campolo =

American sociologist and pastor (1935–2024)

The Reverend Tony Campolo
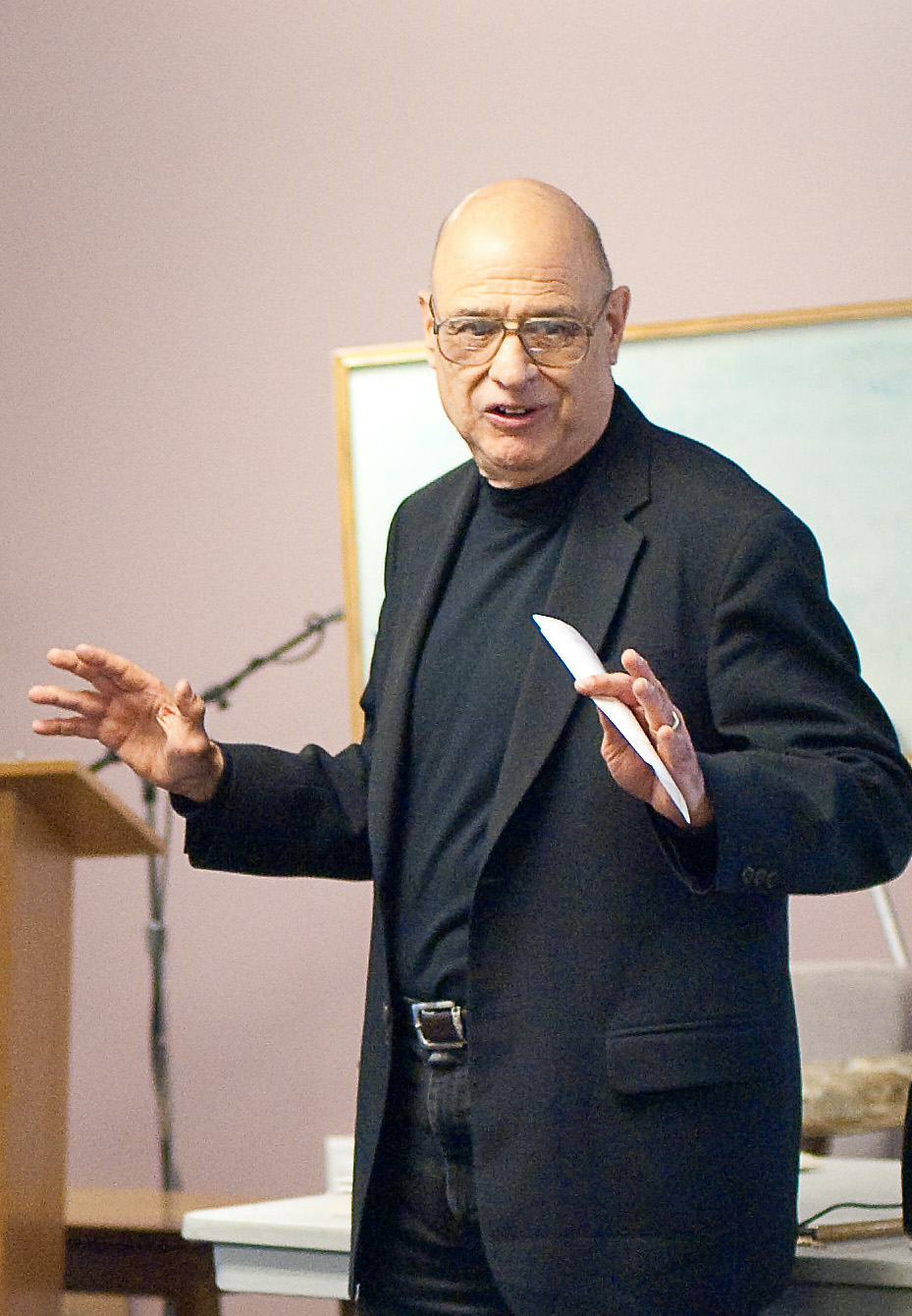
- Tony Campolo visits the Leadership and Spiritual Formation Doctor of Ministry cohorts at Cannon Beach, Oregon
- Church: St. John's Baptist Church in Philadelphia

Orders
- Ordination: 1957

Personal details
- Born: Anthony Campolo Jr. February 25, 1935 Philadelphia, Pennsylvania, U.S.
- Died: November 19, 2024 (aged 89) Bryn Mawr, Pennsylvania, U.S.
- Denomination: Baptist (American Baptist Churches USA)
- Occupation: Associate Pastor of the St. John's Baptist Church in Philadelphia, since 2019, Professor emeritus of Sociology at Eastern University in St David's, Pennsylvania; Evangelical Association for the Promotion of Education (EAPE)
- Education: B.A. at Eastern College, BD and MDiv at Eastern Baptist Theological Seminary; PhD, Temple University (Sociology)

Anthony Campolo Jr. (February 25, 1935 – November 19, 2024) was an American sociologist, Baptist pastor, author, public speaker, and spiritual advisor to U.S. President Bill Clinton. Campolo was an influential leader in the evangelical left. Campolo was a popular commentator on religious, political, and social issues, and had been a guest on programs such as The Colbert Report, The Charlie Rose Show, Larry King Live, Nightline, Crossfire, Politically Incorrect and The Hour.

== Early life and education ==
Campolo was born to an Italian-American family in Philadelphia on February 25, 1935. He studied at Eastern College and obtained a Bachelor of Arts in 1956. He was ordained a Baptist pastor in 1957. He also studied theology at Palmer Theological Seminary and obtained a Bachelor of Divinity in 1960 and a Master of Divinity in 1961. He studied sociology in Temple University and obtained a Doctor of Philosophy in 1968.

== Career ==
In 1964, Campolo became professor of sociology at Eastern University in St. David's, Pennsylvania. For ten years, he also taught at the University of Pennsylvania.

He became an associate pastor of the Mount Carmel Baptist Church in West Philadelphia, which is affiliated with both the National Baptist Convention, USA, Inc. and the American Baptist Churches USA.

In 1969, he founded the Evangelical Association for the Promotion of Education (EAPE), which works to help "at-risk" youth in the U.S. and Canada, and has helped to establish several schools and universities.

In 1976, Campolo ran as the Democratic candidate for the U.S. House of Representatives in Pennsylvania's 5th district, but lost to incumbent Republican Dick Schulze.

Campolo was the subject of an informal heresy hearing in 1985 brought about by several assertions in his 1983 book A Reasonable Faith, particularly his claim that, "Jesus is actually present in each other person". The book became a hot button issue, and caused Campus Crusade for Christ and Youth for Christ to block a planned speaking engagement by Campolo. The Christian Legal Society empowered a "reconciliation panel", led by noted theologian J. I. Packer, to examine the issue and resolve the issue. The panel examined the book and questioned Campolo. The panel issued a statement saying that although it found Campolo's statements "methodologically naïve and verbally incautious", it did not find them to be heretical.

In 1998, he became a spiritual adviser to President Bill Clinton.

In 2007, with Shane Claiborne, he founded Red-Letter Christians, with the aim of bringing together evangelicals who believe in the importance of insisting on issues of social justice mentioned by Jesus (in red in some translations of the Bible). He also became a leader of the Red-Letter Christian movement, which aims to put emphasis on the teachings of Jesus.

In March 2011, Campolo began hosting the TV show Red Letter Christians, aired on JC-TV. This weekly half-hour talk show features interviews with leaders in the Red-Letter Christian movement.

On January 14, 2014, Campolo announced his plans to retire from leading the EAPE and to close that ministry, the extra money in the ministry being distributed to offshoot ministries started by EAPE.

== Views on religion and politics ==
Although Campolo associated himself with the Democratic Party and several other modern liberal groups and causes, he publicly stated his opposition to abortion. Campolo held a consistent life ethic stance in opposition to any human situation that leads to the termination of life including warfare, poverty/starvation (as caused by extreme wealth inequalities), capital punishment, and euthanasia.

Starting in the late 1980s, Campolo's left-leaning political beliefs began to put leaders of the Christian right, such as Gary Bauer and Jerry Falwell, at odds with him. Despite his criticisms of political conservatives in the evangelical community, Campolo also criticized the more liberal mainline Christian denominations.

Along with his wife, Peggy Campolo, he participated in very public debates and discussions about the place of lesbians and gays within church and society. Campolo formerly contended that homosexuality was a sin in practice, although not in orientation, while his wife disagreed, holding that committed, monogamous homosexual practice was not a sin; she supports full equality for LGBT people. Regarding marriage, he stated that all couples should have the right to a civil union with all the legal rights that are associated with such a contract.

On June 8, 2015, Campolo released a statement changing his position on the issue of gay relationships, and stating that he now supports blessings of same-sex marriage. He cited several reasons including the institution of marriage primarily being about spiritual growth instead of procreation, what he had learned through his friendships with gay Christian couples, studies of the Bible and past examples of exclusionary church traditions, like slavery, practiced "by sincere believers, but most of us now agree that they were wrong."

Campolo offered the benediction on the second night of the 2016 Democratic National Convention in Philadelphia, including in his prayer "We are a nation that needs healing. Break down the barriers of race and ethnicity that separate us. Cure the sexism and homophobia that denies the dignity of so many of our fellow Americans. Help us to overcome our fears of refugees and show us how to love our enemies and overcome evil with good."

In 2018, he participated in a "Red Letter Revival" in Lynchburg, Virginia, intended to highlight the connection between Evangelical Christianity and concern for social justice. Describing the Red-Letter Christian movement that organized that revival, he said:

"We want to be people of Jesus. That does have political implications. You can't go to the New Testament without sensing Jesus' commitment to the poor. … We basically see ourselves as committed to them. And that list in the 25th chapter of Matthew talks about welcoming the alien. Those aligning with Donald Trump are aligning with an anti-refugee mindset. We feel if we are reading the scriptures honestly, we are to receive the alien. I guess we are progressive in the sense that … we are opposed to the view of women that puts them in a submissive position. We are saying we don't really buy that. … I can understand why we are called "progressive evangelicals" because we stand over and against the kind of reactionary points of view that are being established by evangelicals across the country."

== Personal life ==
Campolo married Peggy Davidson on June 7, 1958. Their daughter was born in 1960 and their son was born in 1963. His son, Bart Campolo, is a former evangelical preacher who left Christianity and transitioned to secular humanism. The two engaged in an ongoing conversation since Bart announced to him that he no longer believed in God. They co-authored a book exploring the issues at the heart of this conversation, and a documentary film (Leaving My Father's Faith) was released in 2018 which features the conversations between them and tell the story of Bart's journey out of faith.

=== Illness and death ===
In June 2020, Campolo had a stroke which left him partially paralyzed. He died from heart failure at his home in Bryn Mawr, Pennsylvania, on November 19, 2024, at the age of 89.

== Awards and honors ==
=== Honorary degrees ===
- 2006: Doctor of Humane Letters, Eastern University

== Published works ==
- The Success Fantasy. Victor Books. 1980. ISBN 0882077961.
- The Power Delusion: A Serious Call to Consider Jesus' Approach to Power. Victor Books. 1983. ISBN 0882072927.
- A Reasonable Faith: Responding to Secularism. Word Books. 1983. ISBN 9780849903250.
- Ideas for Social Action: A Handbook on Mission and Service for Christian Young People. Youth Specialties. 1983. ISBN 9780910125031.
- You Can Make a Difference. Word Books. 1984. ISBN 9780849929793.
- It's Friday, But Sunday's Comin'. Word Books. 1984. ISBN 9780849903694.
- We Have Met the Enemy, and They are Partly Right. Jarrell. 1985. ISBN 9780849903687.
- Seven Deadly Sins. Victor Books. 1987. ISBN 9780896935334.
- Who Switched the Price Tags?. Thomas Nelson. 1987. ISBN 9780849930881.
- 20 Hot Potatoes Christians Are Afraid to Touch. Word Publishing. 1988. ISBN 9780849906558.
- Growing Up in America: A Sociology of Youth Ministry. Youth Specialties. 1989. ISBN 9780310524700.
- Things We Wish We Had Said: Reflections of a Father and His Grown Son. Word Publishing. 1989. ISBN 9780849906855. (co-written with Bart Campolo)
- Wake Up America! Answering God's Radical Call While Living in the Real World. HarperCollins Canada. 1991. ISBN 9780062520227. (Later published as Campolo, Anthony; Campolo, Tony (1993). Stand Up and Be Counted. Marshall Pickering. ISBN 0551027940.)
- How to be Pentecostal Without Speaking in Tongues. Word Publishing. 1991. ISBN 9780849908842.
- Sociology Through the Eyes of Faith. HarperCollins. 1992. ISBN 9780060613150. (co-written with David A. Fraser)
- How to Rescue the Earth Without Worshiping Nature: A Christian's Call to Save Creation. Thomas Nelson. 1992. ISBN 9780840777720.
- Everything You've Heard Is Wrong. Word Publishing. 1992. ISBN 9780849909344.
- The Kingdom of God Is a Party: God's Radical Plan for His Family. Thomas Nelson. 1992. ISBN 9780849933998.
- Carpe Diem (Seize the Day). Word Publishing. 1994. ISBN 9780849910081.
- Is Jesus a Republican Or a Democrat? And 14 Other Polarizing Issues. Word Publishing. 1995. ISBN 9780849910098. (Later published as Was Jesus a Moderate? And 14 Other Polarizing Issues. Thomas Nelson Incorporated. February 1996. ISBN 978-0-8499-3917-4.)
- Can Mainline Denominations Make a Comeback?. Judson Press. 1995. ISBN 9780817012342.
- Following Jesus Without Embarrassing God. Word Publishing. 1997. ISBN 1568656343.
- Let Me Tell You a Story: Life Lessons from Unexpected Places and Unlikely People. Thomas Nelson. 2000. ISBN 9780849942051.
- Revolution and Renewal: How Churches are Saving Our Cities. Westminster John Knox Press. 2000. ISBN 9780664221980.
- Which Jesus?: Choosing Between Love & Power. Word Publishing. 2002. ISBN 9780849944031.
- Survival Guide for Christians on Campus: How to be Students and Disciples at the Same Time. Howard Books. 2002. ISBN 9781582292366. (co-written with William Willimon)
- Adventures in Missing the Point: How the Culture-controlled Church Neutered the Gospel. Youth Specialties. 2003. ISBN 9780310253846. (co-written with Brian D. McLaren)
- Speaking My Mind: The Radical Evangelical Prophet Tackles the Tough Issues Christians Are Afraid To Face. Word Publishing. 2004. ISBN 9780849918179.
- The Church Enslaved: A Spirituality of Racial Reconciliation. Fortress Press. 2005. ISBN 9781451414646. (co-written with Michael Battle)
- Letters to a Young Evangelical. Basic Books. 2006. ISBN 9780465008315.
- The God of Intimacy and Action: Reconnecting Ancient Spiritual Practices, Evangelism, and Justice. Wiley. 2007. ISBN 9780787987411. (co-written with Mary Albert Darling)
- Red Letter Christians: A Citizen's Guide to Faith and Politics. Gospel Light. 2008. ISBN 9780830745296.
- Stories That Feed Your Soul. Gospel Light. 2010. ISBN 9780830747757.
- Connecting Like Jesus. Jossey-Bass. 2010. ISBN 9780470431023. (co-written with Mary Albert Darling)
- Red Letter Revolution: What If Jesus Really Meant What He Said?. Thomas Nelson. 2012. ISBN 9781400204182. (co-written with Shane Claiborne)
- Pilgrim: A Theological Memoir. Eerdmans. 2025. ISBN 9780802884947. (co-written with Steve Rabey)
