= New Monasticism =

American Christian movement

New Monasticism is a diverse movement, not limited to a specific religious denomination or church and including varying expressions of contemplative life. These include evangelical Christian communities such as "Simple Way Community" and Jonathan Wilson-Hartgrove's "Rutba House," European new monastic communities, such as that formed by Bernadette Flanagan, spiritual communities such as the "Community of the New Monastic Way" founded by feminist contemplative theologian Beverly Lanzetta, and "interspiritual" new monasticism, such as that developed by Rory McEntee and Adam Bucko. These communities expand upon traditional monastic wisdom, translating it into forms that can be lived out in contemporary lives "in the world."

== Origins ==
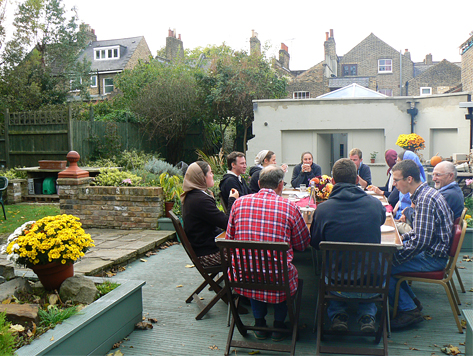
Members of the Anabaptist Christian Bruderhof Communities live, eat, work and worship communally.

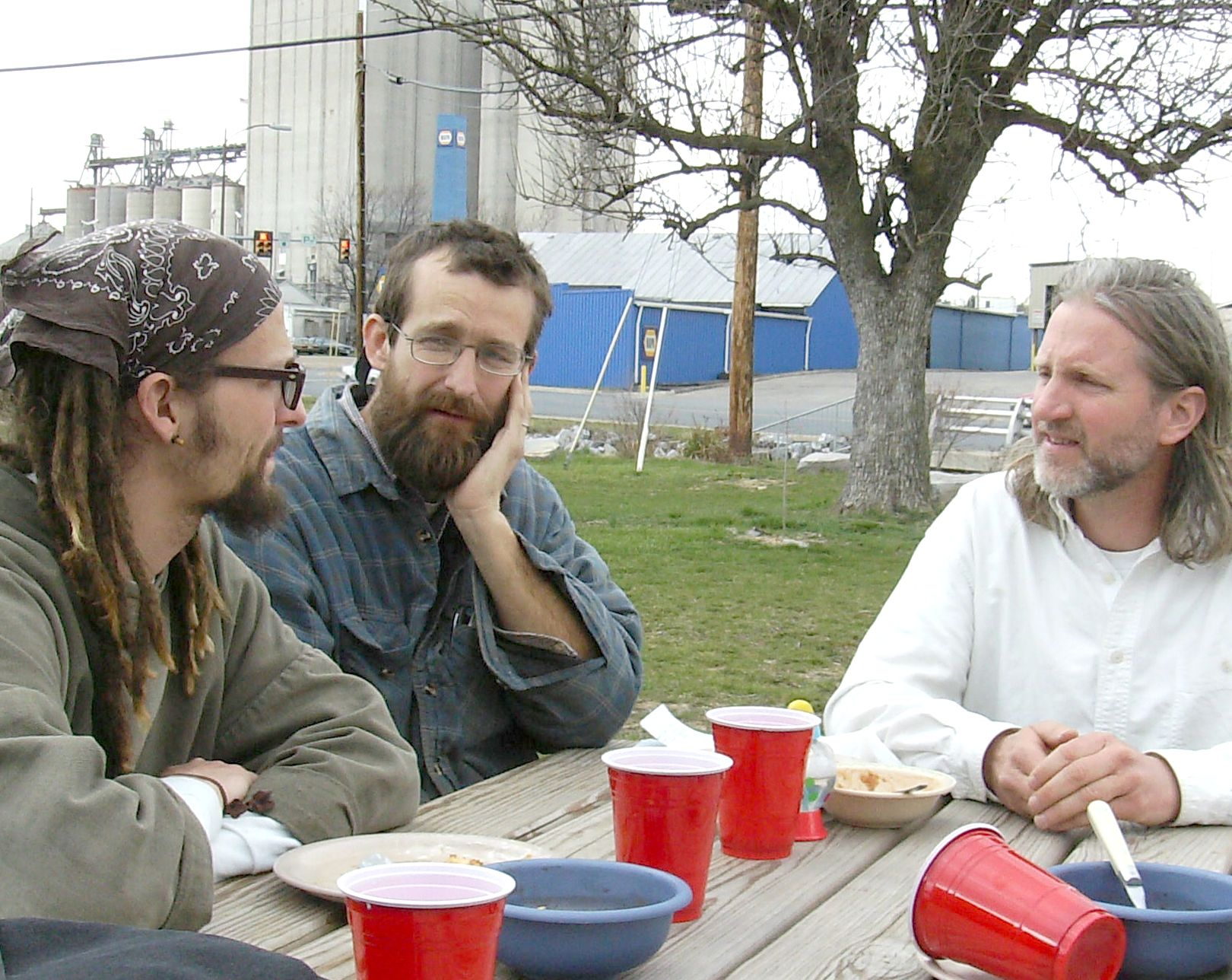
New monastic Shane Claiborne with Ron Copeland and Brian Farrell at Our Community Place, Harrisonburg, Virginia, 2008

The origin of the new monastic movement is difficult to pinpoint. Some communities now identified with new monasticism have been in existence since the 1970s and 80s in the UK. Other well-known communities, such as the Simple Way in Philadelphia, formed in the mid-90s. Bede Griffiths, a Catholic Camaldolese Benedictine monk who oversaw a Christian Ashram in India from 1968 to 1993, spoke often of the future of monasticism as being a '"lay movement"', and developed a vision for new monastic life. Raimon Panikkar outlined the idea of a '"new monk"' in a series of lectures in 1980 given to a group of western and eastern monastics as well as non-monastic lay contemplatives at Holyoke, MA, which were subsequently published in the book Blessed Simplicity: The Monk as Universal Archetype. In the early 1980s, contemplative feminist theologian Beverly Lanzetta started the '"Community of the New Monastic Way"', a non-denominational new monastic community still in existence today. Recently, various new monastic communities have appeared in Ireland and increasingly across the United States, including '"interspiritual"' new monastic communities, connected to the lineage of Bede Griffiths, such as that seen in the Foundation for New Monasticism.

== Protestant forms ==
The notion and terminology of Protestant "new monasticism" was developed by Jonathan Wilson in his 1998 book called Living Faithfully in a Fragmented World. Wilson was, in turn, building on ideas of theologian Dietrich Bonhoeffer, who said in 1935: "the restoration of the church will surely come only from a new type of monasticism which has nothing in common with the old but a complete lack of compromise in a life lived in accordance with the Sermon on the Mount in the discipleship of Christ." Wilson also built on ideas of philosopher Alasdair MacIntyre. Noting the decline of local community that could sustain the moral life, MacIntyre ended his book After Virtue, by voicing a longing for "another... St. Benedict." By this, he meant someone in the present age to lead another renewal of morality and civility through community. Wilson identified with that longing in his own book, but outlined a vision to carry it forward within the Protestant Christian tradition.

Calling the vision a "new monasticism", he proposed four characteristics that such a monasticism would entail: (1) it will be "marked by a recovery of the telos of this world" revealed in Jesus, and aimed at the healing of fragmentation, bringing the whole of life under the lordship of Christ; (2) it will be aimed at the "whole people of God" who live and work in all kinds of contexts, and not create a distinction between those with sacred and secular vocations; (3) it will be disciplined, not by a recovery of old monastic rules, but by the joyful discipline achieved by a small group of disciples practicing mutual exhortation, correction, and reconciliation; and (4) it will be "undergirded by deep theological reflection and commitment," by which the church may recover its life and witness in the world.

The middle months of 2004 became a defining moment for the movement, when there was a gathering of a number of existing communities and academics in Durham, North Carolina, where they drew together something like a "rule of life," referred to as the "12 marks" of new monasticism. The gathering took place at a new monastic community called "Rutba House," of which some founding members were Jonathan and Leah Wilson-Hartgrove. Not coincidentally, Leah Wilson-Hartgrove is the daughter of Jonathan Wilson whose writing has galvanized the movement.

Building on the work of MacIntyre, Rod Dreher published a book in 2017 called The Benedict Option. In this he outlines a strategy for western Christians to survive the influence of a hostile society. He identifies order, prayer and work, stability, community, hospitality and balance as tools for living a Christian life. Dreher points to intentional communities such as Trinity Presbyterian Church in Charlottesville, the Bruderhof, or the School for Conversion as examples of the Benedict Option being lived out today.

=== Common themes ===
==== Values ====
Most Protestant new monastic communities emphasize the following:

- Thoughtful, prayerful, and contemplative lives
- Communal life (expressed in a variety of ways depending on the community)
- A focus on hospitality
- Practical engagement with the poor

==== "Twelve Marks" ====
The "Twelve Marks" of new monasticism express the common thread of many new monastic communities. These "marks" are:

1. Relocation to the "abandoned places of Empire" [at the margins of society]
2. Sharing economic resources with fellow community members and the needy among us
3. Hospitality to the stranger
4. Lament for racial divisions within the church and our communities combined with the active pursuit of a just reconciliation
5. Humble submission to Christ's body, the Church
6. Intentional formation in the way of Christ and the rule of the community along the lines of the old novitiate
7. Nurturing common life among members of an intentional community
8. Support for celibate singles alongside monogamous married couples and their children
9. Geographical proximity to community members who share a common rule of life
10. Care for the plot of God's earth given to us along with support of our local economies
11. Peacemaking in the midst of violence and conflict resolution within communities along the lines of Matthew 18
12. Commitment to a disciplined contemplative life

==== Differences from traditional Christian monasticism ====
The movement differs from other Christian monastic movements in many ways.

- Traditional monastic vows of celibacy, poverty, and obedience are not normally taken, as with members of traditional monastic orders, such as the Benedictines, Cistercians, Carthusians, and Basilians.
- Communities do not always live in a single place, but geographic proximity is emphasized by the movement.
- The movement allows married couples. Most traditional forms of Christian religious life do not admit married couples. (Certain centuries-old Catholic, Lutheran and more recent Anglican groups, known as "third," "secular," or "lay" orders, also admit married individuals who profess the spirituality of the order (including the Franciscans and Dominicans), but these are neither new nor monastic.) This, however, does not apply to much newer movements in the Catholic Church that accept married couples even into their core governance structures, of course. Check new communities such as Verbum Dei Missionary Fraternity, etc. Missionary married couples there profess spirituality of the community there too. Furthermore, members do not wear habits.
- Not all new monastic orders have religious garb and those which do will not normally require members to wear religious habits. This is somewhat similar to traditions among the long-established Catholic third orders, whose members may wear some form of the religious habit of the order with which they are associated.

== Other forms ==
=== Bede Griffiths ===
Catholic Camaldolese Benedictine monk Bede Griffiths spoke of monastic life being essentially a lay calling, and saw the future of monastic life in lay communities. "The monk is a lay person…An order of monastics is essentially a lay order. Some monks may live in monasteries, but increasingly the majority will live in their own homes or form small communities—a monastic order in the world." He went on to express a new vision for monastics, one in which communities and individuals live spiritual lives independent of religious organizations or institutions, independent of celibacy and overarching rules and dogmas—free to follow their own conscience and guidance of the Holy Spirit in living a sacred life, yet united in the common cause of building a sacred world. A good summary of Fr. Bede's thought on these matters is found in The New Creation in Christ. Fr. Bede also wrote many other books on contemplative life, inter-religious experience and exploration, and the relationship between science and religion.

=== The "New Monk" ===
Raimon Panikkar explicated a vision of the "new monk" during a series of lectures given to western and eastern monastic from various religious traditions and lay contemplatives in 1980 at Holyoke, MA, these lectures were subsequently published as Blessed Simplicity: The Monk as Universal Archetype. There Panikkar said the traditional monk is "only one way of realizing [this] universal archetype. … If the monastic dimension exists at least potentially in everybody, the institution of monasticism should be equally open to everybody. … The monastery, then, would not be the 'establishment' of the monks, but the schola Domini, the school where that human dimension is cultivated and transmitted. … Here appears the consequence of our distinction between the monk as archetype, i.e., the monk as a paradigm of religious life, against the archetype of the monk, i.e., the human archetype lived out by the monks, but which may also be experienced and lived today in different ways."

=== The Community of a New Monastic Way ===
The Community of a New Monastic Way was co-founded by Beverly Lanzetta, a theologian, contemplative scholar, and teacher of contemplative wisdom traditions.

Central to Lanzetta's scholarship and teaching is the mystical path of the feminine, which she calls via feminina. She writes: "As a distinct spirituality, via feminina is attentive to the multiple wisdoms of body, psyche, and soul, placing primary importance on healing those social factors - whether gender, culture, race, sexual orientation, religious belief, etc. - that stigmatize persons, rob them of dignity, wound their souls, and betray the highest aspirations of religious life. It thus is an invitation to divest one's being of subtle forms of injustice imbedded in the categories that define the religious life - redemption, salvation, nirvana, samadhi, soul, god - as well as in the processes of mystical ascent - purification, great death, annihilation, union - and hinder the full integration and liberations of the self."

Lanzetta's vision of intimate wholeness is articulated in her various works, which include her booksThe Monk Within: Embracing a Sacred Way of Life Emerging Heart: Global Spirituality and the Sacred, Path of the Heart: A Spiritual Guide to Divine Union and Radical Wisdom: A Feminist Mystical Theology.

The Community of a New Monastic Way is one of many spiritual initiatives which articulate Lanzetta's belief that the contemplative dimension of new monastic life both proceeds and goes beyond the religious traditions themselves. The Community of a New Monastic Way became officially known as such in 2008, having formed over the course of decades. In 2008, eight people took vows as new monks after completing a formal process created, initiated, and taught by Lanzetta. The community has since grown to include 18 members and exists outside of any religious structure, with members living all over the United States, gathering throughout the year for community practice.

=== Interspiritual ===
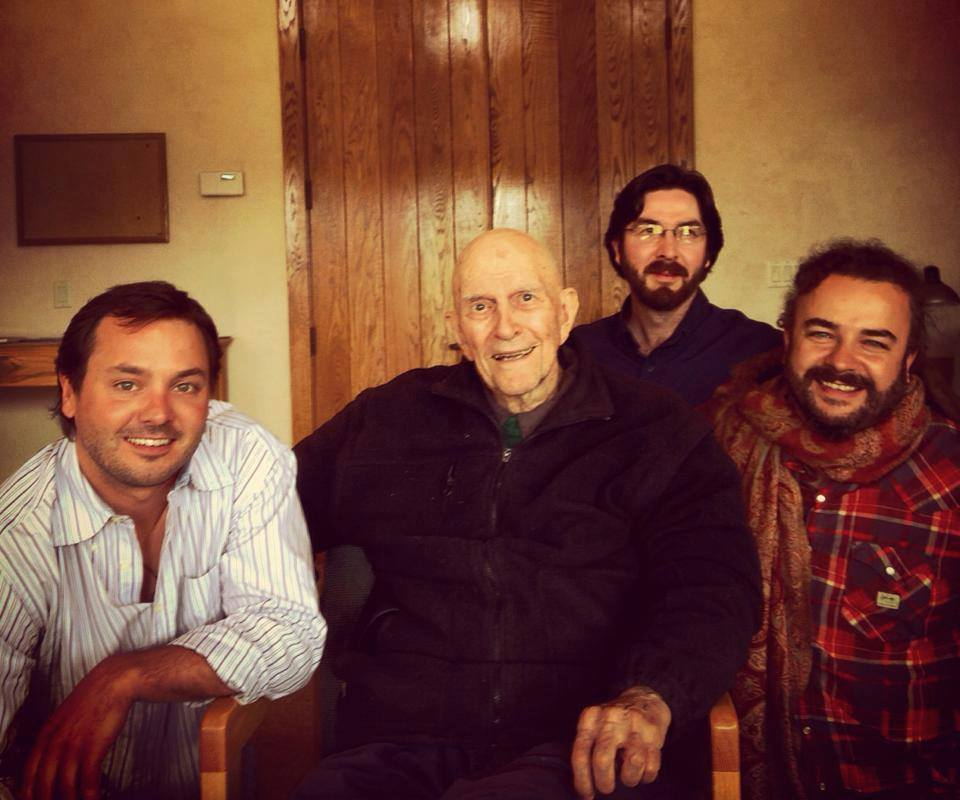
New Monastics Rory McEntee, Netanel Miles-Yepez, and Adam Bucko with Father Thomas Keating at St. Benedict's monastery, Snowmass, Colorado, 2014

Inspired by the new monastic forms of Bede Griffiths and Raimon Panikkar, and in partnership with Catholic monks Father Thomas Keating and Brother Wayne Teasdale, an "interspiritual" movement of new monasticism has formed around the work of young spiritual leaders and social activists in partnership with traditional monastics. This form of new monasticism is expressed and developed in Rory McEntee and Adam Bucko's The New Monasticism: An Interspiritual Manifesto for Contemplative Life. Other collaborators include Episcopal priest Matthew Wright, Sufi lineage holder Pir Netanel Miles-Yepez, David and Tamara Milliken and their "InnerSky Community", V.K. Harber's work, and others.

Brother Wayne Teasdale coined the words interspiritual and interspirituality, which he described in his books The Mystic Heart: Discovering a Universal Spirituality in the World's Religions and A Monk in the World: Cultivating a Spiritual Life as a new orientation of religious and spiritual life with the following elements:

- It will be an enhanced understanding of the inner life through assimilating the psychological, moral, aesthetic, spiritual, and literary treasures of the world's religions. Each tradition will define itself in relation to every other viable tradition of the inner life; each will take into account the totality of the spiritual journey
- It is deeply concerned with the plight of all those who suffer, wherever they are...
- It follows a strict adherence to ecological justice ...
- It doesn't just depend on books or spiritual reading, but looks to art, music, and movies ... universal languages of vast sacred potential ... to nourish contemplative life...
- It recognizes that we are part of a much larger community ... the human, the earth, the solar system, our galaxy, and the universe itself...
- Intermysticism [or interspirituality] is the deepest expression of the religious dimension of human life. It is the actual religion of each one of us when we arrive at the point of spiritual maturity.

The Universal Order of Sannyasa (UOOS) uses the term "neoteric monasticism" to self-identify their interspiritual form of new monasticism, and "NeMon" is an abbreviated term designating a "neoteric monastic", according to UOOS's group description on Facebook.

==== The Nine Vows ====
In McEntee and Bucko's The New Monasticism: An Interspiritual Manifesto for Contemplative Life, they describe the "Nine Vows of the New Monastic", which were based on Brother Wayne Teasdale's "Nine Elements of Spiritual Maturity" and developed by the Rev. Diane Berke.

1. I vow to actualize and live according to my full moral and ethical capacity.
2. I vow to live in solidarity with the cosmos and all living beings.
3. I vow to live in deep nonviolence.
4. I vow to live in humility and to remember the many teachers and guides who assisted me on my spiritual path.
5. I vow to embrace a daily spiritual practice.
6. I vow to cultivate mature self-knowledge.
7. I vow to live a life of simplicity.
8. I vow to live a life of selfless service and compassionate action.
9. I vow to be a prophetic voice as I work for justice, compassion and world transformation.

== See also ==
- L'Arche
- Dorothy Day
- Bruderhof
- Catherine Doherty
- Jesuism
- Movement for a New Society
- New religious movement
- Radical orthodoxy
- Tolstoyan movement
- Catholic Worker Movement
- Little Portion Hermitage

== Bibliography ==
- Mike Broadway and Isaac Villegas, "A New Monasticism", Radix vol. 31 no. 4 (2005): pp12–28.
