= Deckman =

Deckman is a surname. Notable people with the surname include:

- Joseph H. Deckman (born 1969), American businessman and lacrosse player and coach
- Melissa Deckman, American political scientist
- Tom Deckman (born 1979), American actor
