= The End of White Christian America =

- Author: Robert P. Jones
- Language: English
- Published: 2016
- Publisher: Simon & Schuster
- Publication place: United States
- Media type: print; e-book; audiobook
- ISBN: 978-1-5011-2229-3 (hardcover)

The End of White Christian America is a 2016 American non-fiction book by Robert P. Jones, CEO of the Public Religion Research Institute.

== Summary ==
The book looks at the political and cultural changes of an America that is no longer an evangelical majority white Christian nation.

Robert P. Jones’s central finding is that “White Christian America” is not simply a demographic category but a historical regime of cultural and political dominance built primarily by white Protestants, and that this regime has now passed its peak and entered terminal decline. The book argues that the United States is no longer a majority white Christian nation, and that many of the nation’s recent cultural conflicts are best understood as reactions to that loss of status rather than isolated disputes over policy or morality. Jones’s basic claim is not that white Christians have disappeared, but that they can no longer assume they are the country’s defining norm.

=== Core Argument ===
Jones defines White Christian America as the overlapping world of white mainline and white evangelical Protestants that, for much of American history, shaped the nation’s moral language, institutions, and political self-understanding. He emphasizes that this world was historically powerful enough to treat its own values as synonymous with American values, even though it always rested on exclusion, especially in relation to slavery, segregation, Catholics, Jews, and later religious minorities and the nonreligious. In his framing, the “end” of White Christian America is not a claim that Christianity is ending in the United States, but that white Protestant Christianity no longer occupies the center of national life.

The book’s strongest interpretive move is to connect demographic change with cultural anxiety. Jones argues that changes in immigration, birth rates, and religious disaffiliation among younger Americans have sharply reduced the proportion of white Christians, while also reducing their ability to set the terms of public debate. He insists that this shift explains why issues such as same-sex marriage, religious liberty, the election of Barack Obama, and racial conflict often triggered unusually intense or apocalyptic reactions among many white Christians. The book is therefore both a history of decline and a sociology of resentment.

=== Historical Rise ===
Jones presents White Christian America as a long-lived system that helped organize civic life from the colonial period into the late twentieth century. He describes churches as architectural and institutional centers of public life, and he uses buildings such as the United Methodist Building in Washington and the Interchurch Center in New York to symbolize the rise, confidence, and eventual contraction of white Protestant influence. These structures were built as monuments to Protestant power, but over time they became signs of a lost era and had to be repurposed for more pluralistic uses.

A major part of his historical account is the split between mainline and evangelical Protestantism. Mainline Protestants, especially in the North and Midwest, embraced ecumenism, internationalism, interfaith dialogue and modernist adaptations to science and social change, while evangelicals, especially in the South, defended biblical literalism, moral conservatism, and later Neoconservative politics. Jones argues that these two branches competed for leadership of the same larger white Protestant cultural world, even though they differed in class, geography, theology, and political style.

=== Institutional Decline ===
Jones’s evidence for decline is both institutional and demographic. He notes that white Protestants stopped being a national majority in 1993, and that even when white Catholics are included, white Christians as a whole now make up less than half the country. He also shows that younger adults are dramatically less likely than older Americans to identify as white Christians and much more likely to be religiously unaffiliated. For Jones, this generational pattern matters because it suggests that White Christian America is not merely shrinking temporarily but losing its future reproduction.

The book also traces the weakening of institutions that once anchored white Protestant public authority. The Federal Council of Churches, the National Council of Churches, denominational headquarters, and evangelical publishing and broadcasting networks all represent attempts to preserve influence in the face of broader social change. Jones’s account of the Interchurch Center and the Crystal Cathedral shows that even the most ambitious institutional projects could not withstand demographic diversification, internal fragmentation, or financial pressures. In this sense, the collapse of institutional centrality mirrors the collapse of cultural centrality.

=== Politics and Nostalgia ===
One of Jones’s key findings is that the political behavior of white Christians increasingly reflects nostalgia for a past in which they expected to lead the nation. He links the rise of the Christian Right, the Moral Majority, the Tea Party, and later conservative backlash to a sense of dispossession rather than simple ideology. White Christian America, in his view, responded to pluralization by trying to preserve its former status through partisan mobilization, especially within the Republican Party. But those efforts were increasingly defensive, because the broader population no longer shared the assumption that white Protestant moral norms should govern public life.

Jones is especially interested in how white Christians reacted to Barack Obama’s presidency. He treats the intense challenges to Obama’s legitimacy, citizenship, and religiosity as evidence of a deeper cultural crisis among whites who saw him as outside White Christian America. That reaction, combined with fights over immigration, national identity, and “real America,” reveals how thoroughly racial and religious status are intertwined in contemporary politics. The political lesson of the book is that many post-2008 conflicts are not just partisan disagreements but symptoms of an older regime losing its authority.

=== Family and Sexuality ===
Jones also argues that same-sex marriage became a symbolic battleground because it represented a direct challenge to the moral order White Christian America had long taken for granted. White evangelical Protestants in particular made opposition to gay marriage a defining cause, while many mainline Protestants moved toward acceptance. He sees this divergence not only as a theological disagreement but as proof that white Protestantism can no longer function as a single moral bloc.

The book suggests that the struggle over family values exposed a generational gap inside White Christian America itself. Younger white Christians were more likely to accept LGBTQ+ rights and less willing to identify religion with a conservative social program, while older members often interpreted those changes as moral collapse. Jones reads this as another sign that the old world is losing its internal coherence. The conflict over sexuality thus becomes a proxy for the broader collapse of a once-dominant social consensus.

=== Race and segregation ===
Race is central to Jones’s argument, not incidental. He repeatedly stresses that White Christian America’s power was built in part through accommodation to slavery and, later, toleration or defense of segregation. The book argues that the moral authority of white Protestantism was compromised from within by racial exclusion, even as its institutions helped define American public life. This history matters because the decline of White Christian America is also the decline of an order that never fully faced its own racial legacy.

Jones connects this legacy to contemporary racial conflict, especially white reactions to police violence and black protest movements. He argues that many white Christians interpreted such events as isolated incidents, while nonwhite Americans saw them as part of a broader structure of injustice. The result is a widening gap in moral perception, one that cannot be explained simply by partisanship. In his telling, the end of White Christian America requires white Christians to confront the racial history that sustained their former dominance.

=== The Book's Conclusion ===
Jones does not write as a celebrant of White Christian America’s fall. Instead, he presents the transition as morally serious and politically consequential. His closing claim is that white Christians face a choice: they can retreat into defensive enclaves and continue “defensive offensives,” or they can adapt by entering a more pluralistic America with humility and coalition-building. He suggests that the descendants of White Christian America will remain influential, but their influence will depend on partnership rather than presumed authority.

The final finding is therefore prospective as much as retrospective. Jones argues that the country’s new religious landscape is more diverse, more secular, and less organized around white Protestant assumptions than at any time in American history. That transformation has already changed politics, public morality, and institutional life, and it will continue to do so. The book’s main conclusion is that the era when white Protestants could assume they were the nation’s default cultural managers is over.

In sum, The End of White Christian America argues that white Protestant dominance was historically real, institutionally deep, and culturally pervasive, but that it has now been overtaken by demographic pluralism, secularization, and racial diversification. Jones’s book is not simply a lament; it is an attempt to explain why the old order is disappearing and why so many of its descendants experience that change as crisis. Its key contribution is to show that many contemporary American conflicts are best understood as aftershocks of the collapse of a once-dominant religious and racial regime.

== Accolades ==
The End of White Christian America won the 2019 Grawemeyer Religion Award.

== See also ==
- Religion in the United States
- America's Original Sin - 2015 book by Jim Wallis similar in content
- Donald Trump
