= Spamalot =

Musical comedy play by John Du Prez and Eric Idle

- Broadway promotional poster
- Music: John Du Prez; Eric Idle
- Lyrics: Eric Idle
- Book: Eric Idle
- Basis: Monty Python and the Holy Grail by Monty Python
- Premiere: 21 December 2004: Shubert Theatre, Chicago
- Productions: 2004 Chicago; 2005 Broadway; 2006 West End; 2008 1st North American tour 2009 2nd North American tour 2010 1st UK tour 2012 West End revival 2013 3rd North American tour 2015 2nd UK tour 2017 Third UK tour 2023 Broadway revival 2025 4th North American Tour; 2026 Australian Tour
- Awards: Tony Award for Best Musical; Grammy Award for Best Musical Show Album

Spamalot (also known as Monty Python's Spamalot: A New Musical (Lovingly) Ripped Off from the Motion Picture Monty Python and the Holy Grail) (Note: Sometimes the word "new" is omitted from the title.) is a musical with music by John Du Prez and Eric Idle, and lyrics and a book by Idle. Based on the 1975 film Monty Python and the Holy Grail, the musical offers a highly irreverent parody of Arthurian legend, with the title being a portmanteau of Spam and Camelot.

The original 2005 Broadway production directed by Mike Nichols received 14 Tony Award nominations, winning in three categories, including Best Musical. During its initial run of 1,575 performances, the production was seen by more than two million people and grossed over $168 million. Tim Curry starred as King Arthur in the original Broadway and West End productions. It was one of eight UK musicals commemorated on Royal Mail stamps, issued in February 2011.

A film adaptation, directed by Casey Nicholaw from a script by Idle, was announced. Idle later stated on Twitter that the film would not be made due to his former Monty Python colleagues vetoing the project.

== Synopsis ==
=== Before the show ===
A recording encourages members of the audience to "let your cell phones and pagers ring willy-nilly," and comments that they should "be aware there are heavily armed knights on stage that may drag you on stage and impale you." This was recorded by Eric Idle.

=== Act I ===
A historian narrates a brief overview of medieval England. In a miscommunication between the actors and the narrator, the actors sing an introductory song about Finland ("Fisch Schlapping Song"). The Historian returns, irritated, and tells the frolicking Finns that he was talking about England, not Finland. The scene immediately changes to a dreary, dark village with penitent monks in hooded robes chanting Latin and hitting themselves with wooden boards ("Monk's Chant"). King Arthur travels the land with his servant, Patsy, who follows him around banging two coconut shells together to make the sound of a horse's hooves as Arthur "rides" before him. Arthur aims to recruit Knights of the Round Table to join him in Camelot ("King Arthur's Song"). Arthur and Patsy encounter a pair of sentries who begin debating the probability of finding a coconut in a non-tropical climate.

Robin, a collector of plague victims, and Lancelot, a handsome and hot-tempered man, meet as Lancelot attempts to dispose of the sickly Not Dead Fred. Although a plague victim, the man insists that he is not dead yet and he can dance and sing. He begins performing a dance number, but is soon knocked unconscious with a shovel by an impatient Lancelot ("He Is Not Dead Yet"). Lancelot and Robin agree to become Knights together; Lancelot wants to fight in battles, and Robin wants to sing and dance professionally. Not Dead Fred revives, declaring he will serve as Robin's musician, only to be promptly killed by Lancelot.

While attempting to recruit a peasant named Dennis Galahad, Arthur explains that he became King of England because the Lady of the Lake gave him Excalibur, the sword given only to the man fit to rule England. However, Dennis and his mother, Mrs. Galahad, are political radicals and say that any king who has not been elected by the people has no legitimate right to rule over them. To settle the issue, Arthur asks the Lady of the Lake and her "Laker Girls" (named after the cheerleading squad) to appear before Dennis ("Come with Me"). Cheered on by the girls ("Laker Girls Cheer"), the Lady of the Lake turns Dennis into Sir Galahad; together they sing a generic Broadway love song ("The Song That Goes Like This"). Arthur knights Galahad, and subsequently Robin and Lancelot. Together with Sir Bedevere and the "aptly named" Sir Not-Appearing-In-This-Show, a knight resembling Don Quixote who promptly apologises and leaves, they become the Knights of the Round Table ("All for One").

Arthur and the four knights gather in Camelot, a deliberately anachronistic place resembling Las Vegas's Camelot-inspired Excalibur resort, complete with showgirls, oversized dice and the Lady of the Lake as a lounge singer reminiscent of Liza Minnelli ("Knights of the Round Table"/"The Song That Goes Like This (Reprise)"). In the midst of their revelry, they are contacted by God, (Note: A recording voiced by John Cleese in the original Broadway production, Eric Idle in the UK tour, and Steve Martin in the 2023 Broadway revival.) who tells them to locate the Holy Grail.

Urged on by the Lady of the Lake ("Find Your Grail"), the knights set off. They travel throughout the land until they reach a castle, only to be viciously taunted by lewd French soldiers. Bedevere comes up with the idea to retaliate by sending them a large wooden rabbit in the style of the Trojan horse; however, the knights realize after the fact that they forgot to hide inside the rabbit before the French soldiers took it in. Defeated, they leave in a hurry when the French soldiers begin taunting them again, sending cancan dancers after them and throwing barnyard animals at them ("Run Away!"). Arthur and his followers manage to run into the safety of the wings before the French soldiers catapult the Trojan rabbit back at them.

=== Act II ===
The knights are separated after the French soldiers' attack. In a forest, Arthur and Patsy meet the terrifying Knights Who Say "Ni!", who demand a shrubbery. Arthur has no idea where to find a shrubbery, but Patsy cheers him up ("Always Look on the Bright Side of Life") and they find a shrubbery shortly after. Sir Robin wanders the forest with his minstrels ("Brave Sir Robin"), and they encounter the Black Knight, who scares Robin away. Arthur then encounters the Black Knight and defeats him by cutting off both his arms and legs, impaling his still-alive torso on a door, and leaving to give the shrubbery to the Knights Who Say "Ni!".

Arthur and Robin reunite. The Knights Who Say "Ni!" accept the shrubbery and then demand that Arthur put on a musical and bring it to Broadway. (Note: In the British production, the musical must be produced for the West End.) Robin insists that it would be impossible to accomplish this next task, since a successful Broadway musical requires the involvement of Jewish people ("You Won't Succeed on Broadway"). Robin proves his point in a wild production number filled with Ashkenazi Jewish cultural references, a list of Jewish celebrities known for their work on Broadway, and a Fiddler on the Roof parody involving a bottle dance with Grails instead of bottles. Arthur and Patsy promptly set off in search of Jews. (Note: In countries that don't have a tradition of Jews in the theatre, the lyrics of "You Won't Succeed on Broadway" are sometimes changed to instead describe the high production standards and acting talent needed to stage a successful musical in that country. For example, in the South Korean version, Sir Robin sings about recent successful musicals that were staged in Seoul during the previous decade. Meanwhile, members of the ensemble appear onstage dressed as various characters from those musicals. Among these characters are a cat from Cats, Kenickie from Grease, Kim from Miss Saigon, the Phantom from The Phantom of the Opera, and Velma Kelly from Chicago.)

While the Lady of the Lake laments her lack of stage time ("Diva's Lament (What Ever Happened to My Part?)"), Sir Lancelot receives a letter of distress from someone who is being forced into an arranged marriage. He is very surprised to find that the supposed "damsel in distress" is actually an effeminate young man named Prince Herbert ("Where Are You?"). Herbert asks Lancelot to help him escape. Herbert's music-hating father, the King of Swamp Castle, cuts the rope that Herbert is using to climb out of the window, and Herbert falls to his apparent death. Lancelot is a bit puzzled at the king's actions, but discovers that his squire Concorde saved Herbert at the last minute. When Herbert begins to explain, in song, how he was saved, the king charges at Herbert with a spear, preparing to kill him. Lancelot steps in to save Herbert, then gives a tearful, heartfelt speech to the king about sensitivity on Herbert's behalf. The king correctly guesses that Lancelot is homosexual, and Herbert helps Lancelot accept his sexuality in a disco number ("His Name Is Lancelot").

Arthur begins to give up hope of ever putting on a Broadway musical and laments that he is alone, ignoring Patsy ("I'm All Alone"). The Lady of the Lake appears and tells Arthur that he and the Knights have been in a Broadway musical all along. (Note: In some productions she also points out Patsy's presence, to which Arthur claims that he sees Patsy as family and thus does not always consider him a separate person.) The Lady of the Lake tells Arthur that to end the musical, he must find the Grail and marry someone. Arthur proposes to the Lady of the Lake, and she happily accepts. They plan to marry after Arthur finds the Grail ("Twice in Every Show").

The knights reunite, recruit Sir Bors, and meet Tim the Enchanter, a pyromancer who warns them of the danger of a killer rabbit. When the rabbit bites off Bors' head, Arthur uses the Holy Hand Grenade of Antioch against it, knocking down a nearby hill and revealing that the "evil rabbit" was actually a puppet controlled by a surprised puppeteer. A large stone block showing a combination of letters and numbers is also revealed. After pondering the final clue, a confused Arthur asks God for help. A large hand points to the audience and Arthur realises that the letters and numbers refer to a seat number in the audience. The grail is "found" under the seat, and the person sitting in the seat is invited on stage to be rewarded with a small trophy shaped like the Monty Python foot and a polaroid photo ("The Holy Grail"). Arthur marries the Lady of the Lake, who reveals that her name is Guinevere, and Lancelot marries Herbert, who finally gets a chance to sing without interruption from his father. Sir Robin decides to pursue a career in musical theatre. The King of Swamp Castle attempts to interrupt the finale and stop the singing, but Lancelot knocks him unconscious with a shovel. After the bows at curtain call, the company invites the audience to partake in a sing-along of "Always Look on the Bright Side of Life". ("Act 2 Finale / Always Look on the Bright Side of Life (Company Bow)").

== Musical numbers ==
Eric Idle wrote the musical's book and lyrics and collaborated with John Du Prez on the music, except for "Finland", which was written by Michael Palin for Monty Python's Contractual Obligation Album; "Knights of the Round Table" and "Brave Sir Robin", which were composed by Neil Innes for Monty Python and the Holy Grail; and "Always Look on the Bright Side of Life", which was originally written by Idle for the film Monty Python's Life of Brian.

Act I

- Overture – Orchestra
- "Fisch Schlapping Song" – Mayor, Ensemble
- "Monk's Chant" – Monks
- "King Arthur’s Song" – King Arthur, Patsy**
- "He Is Not Dead Yet" – Not Dead Fred, Lancelot, Robin, Men
- "Come with Me" – Lady of the Lake
- "Laker Girls Cheer" – King Arthur, Patsy, Laker Girls
- "The Song That Goes Like This" – Galahad, Lady of the Lake, Women
- "All for One" – King Arthur, Patsy, Robin, Lancelot, Galahad, Bedevere
- "Knights of the Round Table/The Song That Goes Like This (Reprise)" – King Arthur, Patsy, Lancelot, Robin, Galahad, Bedevere, Lady of the Lake, Company
- "Find Your Grail" – Lady of the Lake, King Arthur, Company
- "Run Away!" – The French Taunter, French Guards, King Arthur, Patsy, Robin, Lancelot, Galahad, Bedevere, Company

Act II

- "Always Look on the Bright Side of Life" – Patsy, King Arthur, Men
- "Brave Sir Robin" – Minstrels
- "You Won't Succeed on Broadway" – Robin, Ensemble‡
- "Diva's Lament (What Ever Happened to My Part?)" – Lady of the Lake
- "Where Are You?" – Prince Herbert
- "His Name Is Lancelot" – Lancelot, Prince Herbert, Men
- "I'm All Alone" – King Arthur, Patsy, Men
- "Twice in Every Show" - King Arthur, Lady of The Lake
- "The Holy Grail" – King Arthur, Patsy, Lancelot, Robin, Galahad, Bedevere**
- "Finale" – Herbert, Lancelot, Robin, King Arthur, Lady of the Lake, Company
- "Always Look on the Bright Side of Life (Company Bow)" – Company

**Does not appear on the original cast album.

=== Notes ===
The song "You Won't Succeed on Broadway" was changed to "You Won't Succeed in Showbiz" for the London production and later replaced with the "Star Song" on the UK tour.

"The Cow Song", a song for the French Cow (portrayed by Sara Ramirez) that was cut after the Chicago run, was recorded during the sessions for the original cast album. The track was eventually released for the 20th anniversary edition of the original cast album in 2025.

== Characters ==
=== Court of Camelot ===
- King Arthur of Britain
- Sir Lancelot the Homicidally Brave
- Sir Robin, the Not-Quite-So-Brave-as-Sir-Lancelot-Who-Slew-the-Chicken-of-Bristol-and-Who-Had-Personally-Wet-Himself-at-the-Battle-of-Baden-Hill
- Sir Dennis Galahad, the Dashingly Handsome
- Sir Bedevere, the Strangely Flatulent
- Patsy, King Arthur's trusty servant/steed and constant companion
- Concorde, Lancelot's trusty servant/steed
- Brother Maynard, Camelot's clergyman
- Sir Bors
- Sir Not-Appearing-In-This-Show, dressed as Don Quixote

=== Other characters ===
- The Lady of the Lake (a.k.a. Guinevere)
- Not Dead Fred
- Robin's Lead Minstrel
- The King of Swamp Castle (a.k.a. Herbert's Father)
- Prince Herbert
- French Taunters
- The Black Knight
- The Head Knight Who Says "Ni!"
- Tim the Enchanter
- Mrs. Galahad
- The Killer Rabbit of Caerbannog
- Swamp Castle Guards
- Two Sentries
- Historian: the Narrator
- The Laker Girls
- Knights of the Round Table
- Robin's Minstrels
- God
- Holder of the Holy Grail

=== Doubling of parts ===
In tribute to the film, where six actors played the majority of the male parts (and a few female ones), several actors play multiple roles; the only major characters not doubling are Arthur and the Lady of the Lake. In the Broadway production, the following doubling is used:

- Lancelot/2nd Sentry/The French Taunter/Knight of Ni/Tim the Enchanter
- Robin/1st Sentry/Brother Maynard/2nd Guard
- Galahad/King of Swamp Castle/Black Knight
- Patsy/Mayor of Finland/1st Guard
- Bedevere/Mrs Galahad/Concorde
- The Historian/Prince Herbert/Not Dead Fred/Lead Minstrel/The French Taunter's Best Friend

Sara Ramirez doubled as a witch and a cow in the Chicago previews, but both parts were cut during the pre-Broadway run. Several pairs of characters originally played by the same Monty Python member were reduced to one: the Dead Collector and Sir Robin (Idle), the Large Man with a Dead Body and Sir Lancelot (Cleese), and Dennis the Politically-Active Peasant and Sir Galahad (Michael Palin). In the 2023 production, the actor playing the Historian does not portray the French Taunter's best friend, but instead plays a mime, as well as a baby and a nun.

== Notable casts ==
| Role | Broadway | West End | West End Revival | Kennedy Center | Broadway Revival | Australian Tour |
| Role | 2005 | 2006 | 2012 | 2023 | 2023 | 2026 |
|---|---|---|---|---|---|---|
| King Arthur | Tim Curry | Tim Curry | Marcus Brigstocke | James Monroe Iglehart | James Monroe Iglehart | Stephen Curry |
| The Lady of the Lake | Sara Ramirez | Hannah Waddingham | Bonnie Langford | Leslie Rodriguez Kritzer | Leslie Rodriguez Kritzer | Jaz Flowers |
| Sir Lancelot | Hank Azaria | Tom Goodman-Hill | Kit Orton | Alex Brightman | Taran Killam | Jesse Vasiliadis |
| Patsy | Michael McGrath | David Birrell | Todd Carty | Matthew Saldivar | Christopher Fitzgerald | Jamie Rolton |
| Sir Robin | David Hyde Pierce | Robert Hands | Rob Delaney | Michael Urie | Michael Urie | Gareth Isaac |
| Sir Galahad | Christopher Sieber | Christopher Sieber | Jon Robyns | Nik Walker | Nik Walker | Ethan Jones |
| Prince Herbert | Christian Borle | Darren Southworth | Adam Ellis | Rob McClure | Ethan Slater | Nick White* |
| The Historian | Christian Borle | Darren Southworth | Adam Ellis | Rob McClure | Ethan Slater | Nick White* |
| Sir Bedevere | Steve Rosen | Tony Timberlake | Robin Armstrong | Jimmy Smagula | Jimmy Smagula | Noah Skape |

*credited as "Man of many characters"

=== Notable cast replacements ===
==== Broadway (2005–2009) ====
- King Arthur: Simon Russell Beale, John Bolton, Harry Groener, Jonathan Hadary, Stephen Collins, Michael Siberry, John O'Hurley
- Sir Lancelot: Steve Kazee, Alan Tudyk, Rick Holmes
- Sir Robin: Martin Moran, Clay Aiken, Robert Petkoff
- The Lady of the Lake: Lauren Kennedy, Marin Mazzie, Hannah Waddingham, Merle Dandridge
- Patsy: David Hibbard, Drew Lachey
- Sir Galahad: Lewis Cleale, Bradley Dean
- Sir Bedevere: Brad Oscar
- Prince Herbert: Tom Deckman

==== West End (2006–2009) ====
- King Arthur: Simon Russell Beale, Alan Dale, Peter Davison, Sanjeev Bhaskar
- Sir Lancelot: Bill Ward
- The Lady of the Lake: Marin Mazzie, Nina Söderquist
- Sir Galahad: Michael Xavier

==== West End Revival (2012–2014) ====
- King Arthur: Stephen Tompkinson, Joe Pasquale, Les Dennis, Richard McCourt
- The Lady of the Lake: Anna-Jane Casey, Carley Stenson
- Sir Lancelot: Daniel Boys
- Patsy: Warwick Davis, Dominic Wood

==== Broadway Revival (2023–2024) ====
- Sir Lancelot: Alex Brightman
- Sir Robin: Jonathan Bennett

== Production history ==
=== Chicago (2005) ===
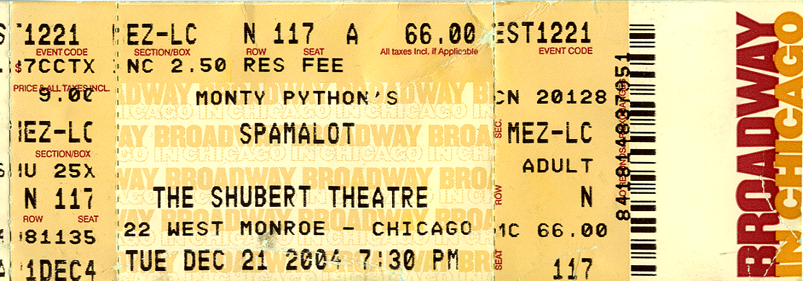
A ticket from the first preview show

Previews of the show began in Chicago's Shubert Theatre (now the CIBC Theatre) on 21 December 2004; the show officially opened there on 9 January 2005.

Two musical numbers were dropped from Act One while the production was still in Chicago. During the scene set in the "Witch Village", the torch song "Burn Her!" was originally performed by Sir Bedevere, The Witch, Sir Robin, Lancelot and Villagers. At the French Castle, "The Cow Song", in a parody of a stereotypical film noir/cabaret style, was performed by The Cow and French Citizens. Before the two songs were cut in Chicago, the lead vocals in both songs were sung by Sara Ramirez. This gave the Lady of the Lake six songs in Act One, but no further appearances until scene five in Act Two, for "The Diva's Lament".

=== Broadway (2005–2009) ===
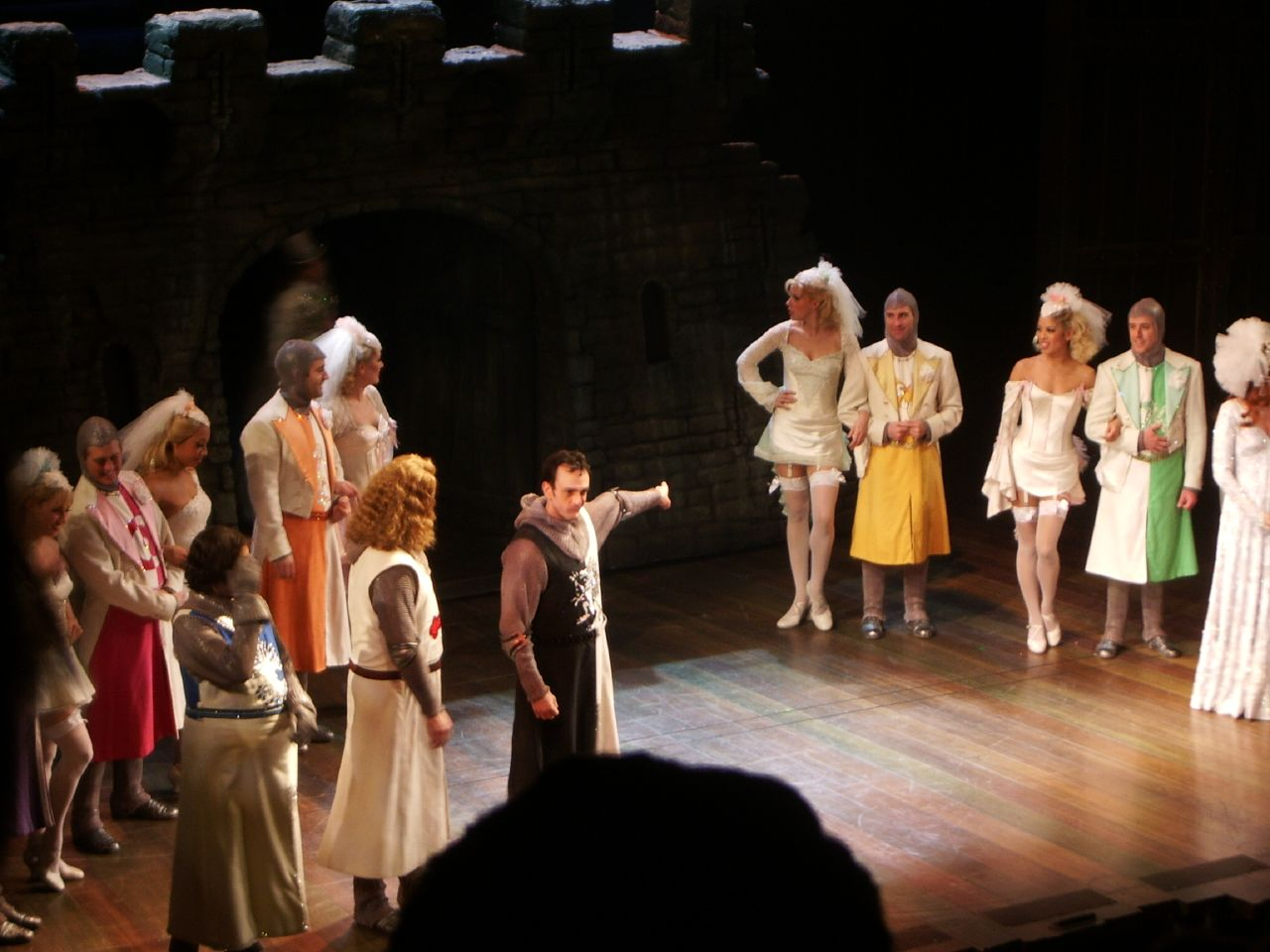
Hank Azaria in the Broadway production of Spamalot.

The musical previewed on Broadway, at New York's Shubert Theatre, beginning 14 February 2005, ahead of an official opening on 17 March. Mike Nichols directed, and Casey Nicholaw choreographed. The production won the Tony Award for Best Musical and was nominated for 14 Tony Awards at the 59th Tony Awards. The show played its final performance on 11 January 2009 after 35 previews and 1,575 performances; it was seen by more than two million people and grossed over $168 million, recouping its initial production costs in under six months.

The original Broadway cast included Tim Curry as King Arthur, Michael McGrath as Patsy and other roles (e.g., the lazy Castle Guard and the Mayor of Finland), David Hyde Pierce as Sir Robin and other roles (e.g., Brother Maynard and the daft Castle Guard), Hank Azaria as Sir Lancelot and other roles (e.g., the French Taunter, Knight of Ni, and Tim the Enchanter), Christopher Sieber as Sir Galahad and other roles (e.g., the Black Knight and Prince Herbert's Father), and Sara Ramirez as the Lady of the Lake. It also included Christian Borle as Prince Herbert and other roles (e.g., the Historian and Not Dead Fred), Steve Rosen as Sir Bedevere and other roles (e.g., Concorde and Dennis's Mother) and John Cleese as the (recorded) Voice of God.

=== West End (2006–2009) ===
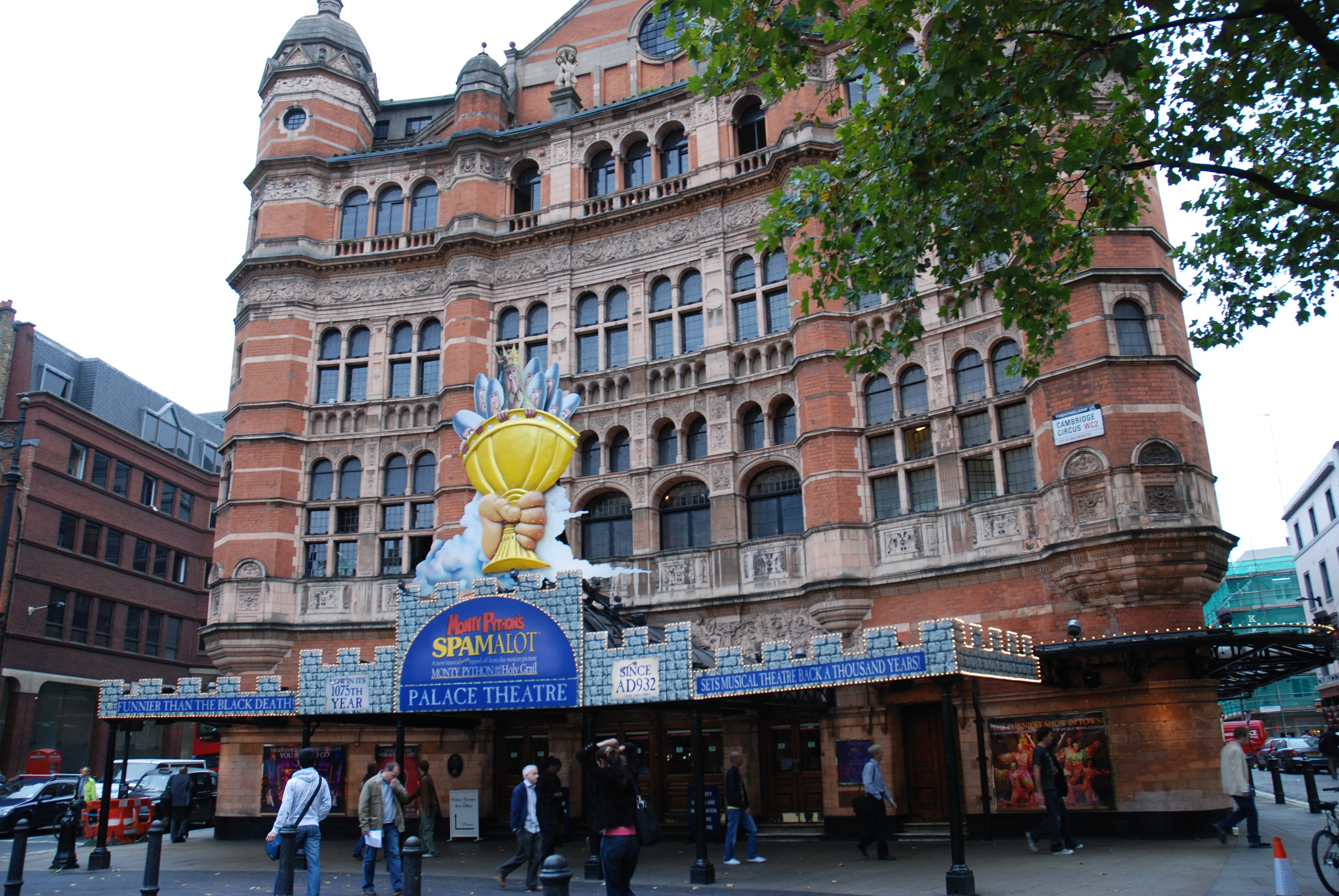
Spamalot showing at the Palace Theatre in October 2008

A London production opened at the Palace Theatre on Shaftesbury Avenue in the West End, commencing 30 September 2006 (London premiere 16 October). Tim Curry and Christopher Sieber reprised their roles from the Broadway production. They were joined by Hannah Waddingham as the Lady of the Lake, Tom Goodman-Hill as Sir Lancelot, Robert Hands as Sir Robin, David Birrell as Patsy, Tony Timberlake as Sir Bedevere and Darren Southworth as Prince Herbert. The London production closed on 3 January 2009.

=== First national tour (2006–2009) ===
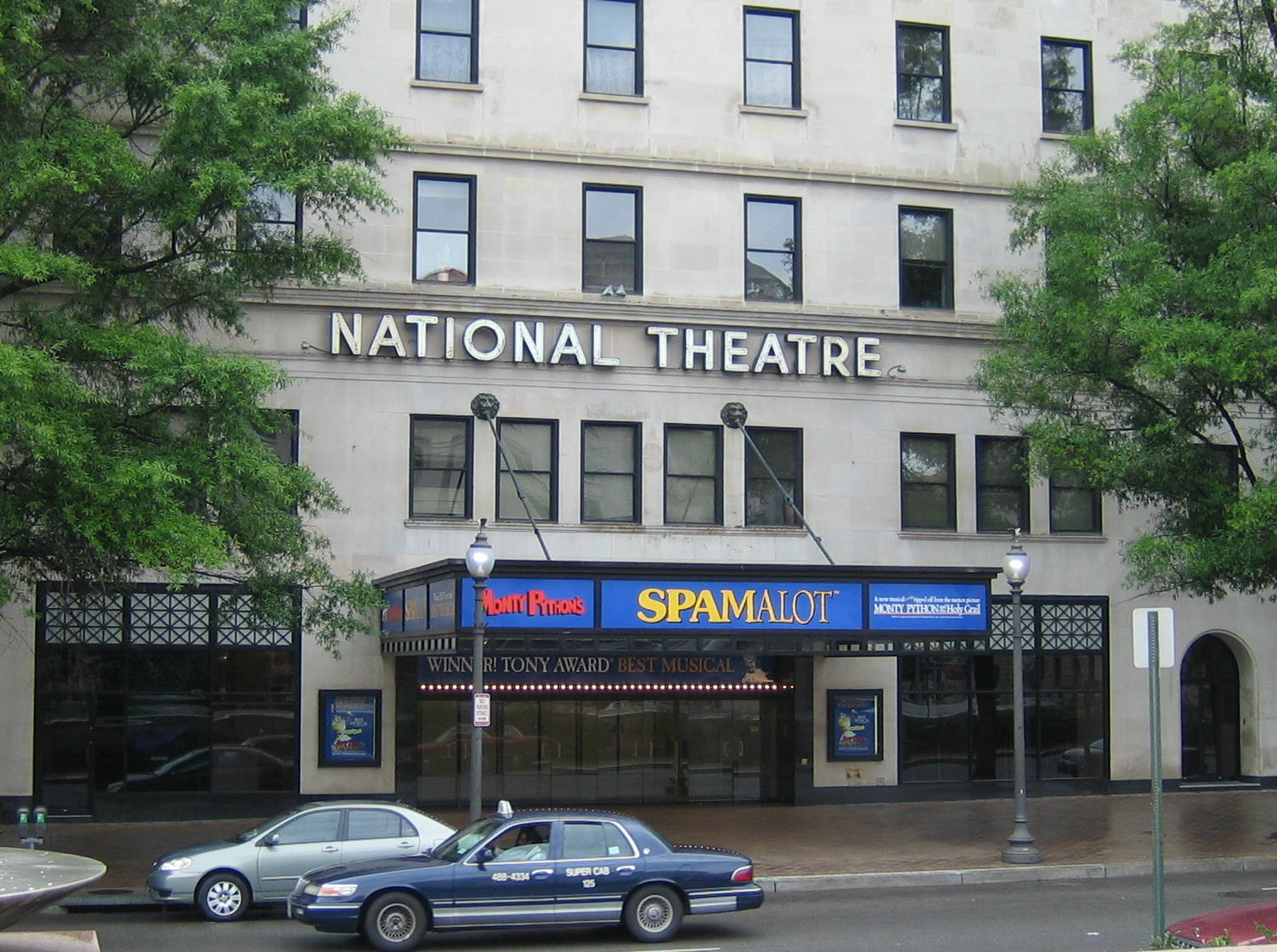
Spamalot's North American tour took it to Washington, D.C.'s National Theatre in May 2006.

A North American tour commenced in spring 2006, and the cast included Michael Siberry as King Arthur (replaced by Gary Beach in 2008), Jeff Dumas as Patsy, Richard Holmes as Lancelot, Bradley Dean as Galahad (replaced by Ben Davis in 2008), and Tom Deckman as The Historian. Richard Chamberlain later joined the tour as King Arthur. The tour continued through the summer 2009, and played its final performances at the Segerstrom Hall in Costa Mesa where it closed on 18 October 2009.

=== Las Vegas (2007–2008) ===
A production of the musical began in Las Vegas, Nevada, previewed on 8 March 2007 and opened on 31 March 2007 at the Wynn Las Vegas in the newly renamed Grail Theater. As with other Las Vegas transfers of Broadway musicals, including The Phantom of the Opera, Spamalot was condensed to run in ninety minutes without an intermission. Among the cuts were the song "All For One", most of the song "Run Away", the Knights of Ni receiving their shrubbery, and the "Make sure he doesn't leave" scene with Prince Herbert's guards.

Actor John O'Hurley starred as King Arthur, with J Anthony Crane playing Lancelot. Due to the Las Vegas production, the North American touring company would not perform in California, Arizona, or Nevada. Although initially contracted to run for up to ten years its final performance was on 18 July 2008.

=== UK tour (2010–2012) ===
A UK tour scheduled for later in 2009 was initially postponed, the producers commenting "Due to unforeseen circumstances the UK Tour of Spamalot will not be taking place as scheduled in 2009", but eventually started at the New Wimbledon Theatre on 29 May – 5 June 2010. Phill Jupitus played King Arthur in the UK tour. Todd Carty played Patsy, assistant to King Arthur for the duration of the tour. Marcus Brigstocke made his musical theatre debut as King Arthur following Jupitus' departure. Jodie Prenger, Hayley Tamaddon, Amy Nuttall and Jessica Martin shared the role of The Lady of the Lake.

The UK tour also featured for the first time a re-working of the song "You Won't Succeed on Broadway" which has been renamed "You Won't Succeed in Showbiz". The theme of the song has been changed from poking fun at the need for Jewish input into Broadway productions and instead mocks the cross over of celebrities in musicals and reality television competitions such as The X Factor. It notably pokes fun at reality TV celebrities including Simon Cowell, Cheryl Cole and Susan Boyle (who is shot by Sir Robin when she begins to sing).

After the West End revival (2012-14), the production toured again from April 2015 starring Joe Pasquale, Todd Carty and Sarah Earnshaw.

=== Second and third national tours (2010–2013) ===
A second North American tour launched on 24 September 2010 from Waterbury, Connecticut, and ended 26 June 2011 in Dallas, Texas. This tour featured a non-Equity cast that included Caroline Bowman as the Lady of the Lake. Another non-Equity North American tour was undertaken in 2013.

=== West End revival (2012–2014) ===
The touring production played a limited seven-week run in the West End during the summer of 2012 at the Harold Pinter Theatre. Marcus Brigstocke shared the role of King Arthur with Jon Culshaw for those seven weeks, with Bonnie Langford playing Lady of the Lake. The production moved to the Playhouse Theatre on 14 November 2012, and ran until 12 April 2014. During 2013 a number of celebrities each played the part of God for a week in aid of charity, including Professor Brian Cox, Gary Lineker, Barbara Windsor, Brian May and Michael Palin.

Other notable cast members during the run of the West End revival included Stephen Tompkinson, Joe Pasquale, Les Dennis and Richard McCourt as King Arthur, Anna-Jane Casey and Carley Stenson as Lady of the Lake, Warwick Davis and Dominic Wood as Patsy, Daniel Boys as Sir Lancelot, Jon Robyns as Sir Galahad and Rob Delaney as Sir Robin.

=== Hollywood Bowl (2015) ===
A three evening performance at the Hollywood Bowl was undertaken in 2015, with Eric Idle appearing in the role of The Historian, and other cast members including Christian Slater, Jesse Tyler Ferguson, Craig Robinson, Merle Dandridge, Warwick Davis, Kevin Chamberlin and Rick Holmes. The script was updated and included many Los Angeles specific jokes.

=== Kennedy Center and Broadway revival (2023) ===
The Kennedy Center for Performing Arts staged Spamalot in the Eisenhower Theater as part of their Broadway Center Stage series from May 12-23, 2023. Directed and choreographed by Josh Rhodes, the production starred James Monroe Iglehart as King Arthur, Alex Brightman as Sir Lancelot, Leslie Rodriguez Kritzer as the Lady of the Lake, Rob McClure as The Historian/Prince Herbert, Michael Urie as Sir Robin, Nik Walker as Sir Galahad, Matthew Saldivar as Patsy, and Jimmy Smagula as Sir Bedevere. The production featured the original script with new jokes, such as a reference to then-Congressman George Santos in "You Won't Succeed on Broadway," a Fiddler on the Roof reference replacing Robin's piano playing in the same song, and DC-related ad libs.

It was announced on August 2, 2023, that the Kennedy Center production would transfer to Broadway at the St. James Theatre, with previews scheduled to begin October 31 before a November 16 opening. Iglehart, Kritzer, Urie, Smagula, and Walker reprised their roles from the Kennedy Center, joined by Christopher Fitzgerald as Patsy and Ethan Slater as The Historian/Prince Herbert. The production opened with Taran Killam playing Lancelot; Brightman reprised his role after Killam left the production in January 2024. Urie played his final performance as Sir Robin on January 21, 2024. On January 23, Jonathan Bennett made his Broadway debut as Sir Robin. The production closed on April 7, 2024. A national tour was planned to begin performances in the autumn of 2025.

=== North American Revival Tour (2025) ===
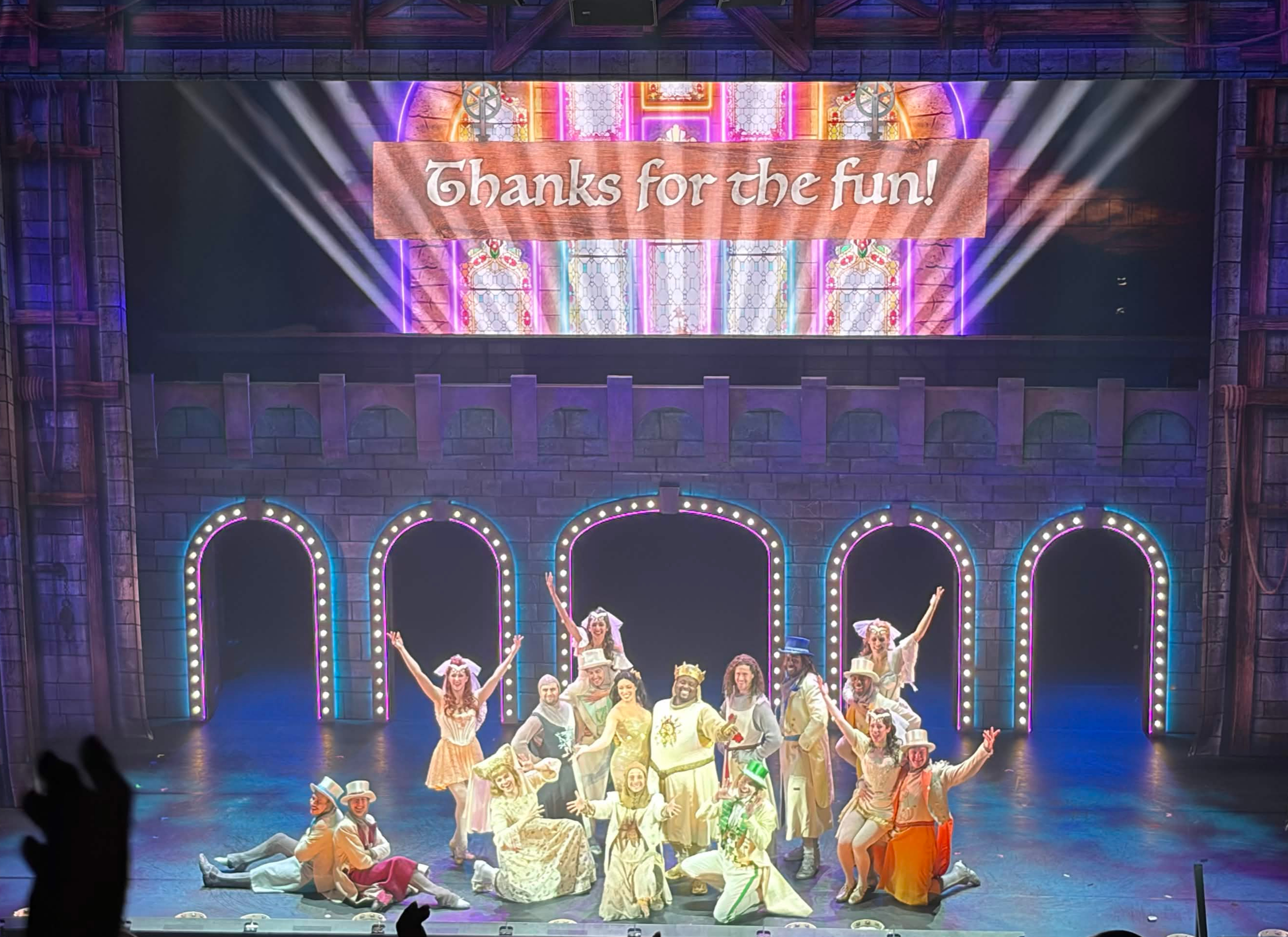
Spamalot in 2026 at the Golden Gate Theatre in San Francisco, California.

The fourth National tour, directed by Josh Rhodes, was launched on December 1st, 2025. The tour started at Connor Palace in Cleveland, Ohio and will plan to end at the Kravis Center for the Performing Arts in West Palm Beach, Florida The cast for the 2025 tour consists of Major Attaway as King Arthur, Sean Bell as Sir Robin, Chris Collins-Pisano as Sir Lancelot, Ellis C Dawson III as Sir Bedevere, Leo Roberts as Sir Galahad, and Amanda Robles as The Lady of the Lake.

At the Los Angeles, California show at the Hollywood Pantages Theatre, Eric Idle was on stage as a special guest for a short period at near the end of the show.

=== International productions ===
A new Australian production started in Melbourne in November 2007 at Her Majesty's Theatre, with the official premiere on 1 December. The cast featured Bille Brown as King Arthur, Ben Lewis as Sir Galahad, Stephen Hall as Sir Lancelot and Mark Conaghan as Prince Herbert. The Australian production closed on 5 April 2008, due to lack of ticket sales and no tour followed. In October 2014, Harvest Rain Theatre Company under the direction of producer Tim O'Connor staged a production of Spamalot with a cast list including Jon English as King Arthur, Simon Gallaher as Patsy, Julie Anthony as the Lady of the Lake, Frank Woodley as Sir Robin, Chris Kellett as Sir Lancelot, Stephen Hirst as Galahad and Shaun McCallum as Sir Bedevere. The production was presented at the Queensland Performing Arts Centre in Brisbane. Beginning in September 2026, production company Drew Anthony Creative ran a production in Melbourne and Sydney. This version starred Stephen Curry as King Arthur, Jaz Flowers as the Lady of The Lake, Jamie Rolton as Patsy, Gareth Isaac as Sir Robin, Noah Skape as Sir Bedevere, Jesse Vasiliadis as Sir Lancelot, Ethan Jones as Sir Galahad, and Nick White as "man of many characters".

The first translated production, in Spanish, ran at Teatre Victòria, Barcelona from 9 September 2008 to 10 May 2009. Directed by Catalan Comedy Group Tricicle and choreographed by Francesc Abós, the cast included Jordi Bosch as King Arthur and Marta Ribera as the Lady of the Lake. The production moved to Madrid in September 2009 A German production premiered in January 2009 at the Musical Dome in Cologne. The Hungarian production in Madach Theatre, Budapest premiered on 29 September 2009 with three casts, each actor taking up multiple roles. The Swedish production opened at the Malmö Nöjesteater in Malmö on 24 September 2010, with a cast including Johan Wester as King Arthur and Johan Glans as Sir Robin. The production moved to Oscarsteatern in Stockholm on 15 September 2011 where it played through 29 April 2012. Nina Söderquist, who starred as Lady of the Lake in the West End production was intended to reprise her role, but became pregnant. She joined the show when it moved to Stockholm, along with Henrik Hjelt as Sir Belvedere. In May 2011, the original UK touring production played at Politeama Rossetti in Trieste. Eric Idle attended the opening night on 24 May.

The Mexican premiere of the show was in July 2011 in Mexico City. The show ran for over 500 performances across the country. The Japanese production ran from 9 to 22 January 2012 at the Akasaka Blitz theater in Tokyo before playing Morinomiya Piloti Hall in Osaka from 2 February to February to 6 February. The production featured Yūsuke Santamaria as King Arthur, Aya Hirano as the Lady of the Lake, Magy as Patsy, Yuya Matsushita as Sir Galahad and Tsuyoshi Muro as Prince Herbert. The South Korean production was presented by OD Musical Company, and CJ Entertainment's Performing Arts division (now a part of CJ E&M); incidentally, CJ CheilJedang, the sister company of CJ Group's entertainment business, manufactures Spam products under license since 1987. It played from 1 October to 28 December 2010, with Yesung of Super Junior and Park In-bae rotating as Sir Galahad. A Norwegian production ran from September to December 2012, with a cast featuring Atle Antonsen as King Arthur, Trond Espen Seim as Sir Lancelot, Anders Baasmo Christiansen as Sir Robin, Espen Beranek Holm as Sir Belvedere and Trond Fausa Aurvåg as Prince Herbert. A Serbian production at Sava Centar in Belgrade had a cast including Nikola Kojo as King Arthur, Nikola Đuričko as Sir Lancelot and Gordan Kičić as Sir Robin.

A production of the show was included in the 2023 season of the Stratford Festival in Stratford, Ontario, Canada with a cast featuring Jonathan Goad as King Arthur, Eddie Glen as Patsy, Aaron Krohn as Sir Lancelot, Trevor Patt as Sir Robin, Liam Tobin as Sir Galahad and Jennifer Rider-Shaw as the Lady of the Lake. This production was directed by Lezlie Wade.

== Title ==
Book-writer and lyricist Eric Idle explained the title in a February 2004 press release:

I like the title Spamalot a lot. We tested it with audiences on my recent US tour and they liked it as much as I did, which is gratifying. After all, they are the ones who will be paying Broadway prices to see the show. It comes from a line in the movie which goes: "we eat ham, and jam, and Spam a lot."

== Reactions by Monty Python members ==
I'm making them money, and the ungrateful bastards never thank me. Who gave them a million dollars each for "Spamalot"?

— Eric Idle

The show has had mixed reactions from Idle's former colleagues in Monty Python.

Terry Gilliam, in an audio interview, describes it as "Python-lite". He later told the BBC News, "It helps with the pension fund, and it helps keep Python alive. As much as we'd like to pull the plug on the whole thing it carries on – it's got a life of its own."

Terry Jones – who co-directed the original film with Gilliam – expressed his opinions forthrightly in May 2005: "Spamalot is utterly pointless. It's full of air … Regurgitating Python is not high on my list of priorities." However, when asked whether he liked Spamalot during an interview with Dennis Daniel on 98.5 WBON-FM The Bone shortly after the musical's opening on Broadway, Jones said, "Well, I thought it was terrific good fun. It's great to see the audience loving it. I suppose I had reservations as far as … well … the idea of doing scenes from a film on stage. I just don’t get the point of it. They do them terribly well … I mean, they really are good … but I just quite don’t understand what that's about. It isn’t really 'Python.' It is very much Eric." Jones went on to say, "I think the best parts of the musical are the new things. For instance, when they do the Andrew Lloyd Webber take-off and this girl comes in and sings 'Whatever [sic] Happened to My Part' since she hasn’t appeared since the opening number and she's really furious! That is one of the great moments where the show really comes alive for me."

In an October 2006 interview, Michael Palin said, "We’re all hugely delighted that Spamalot is doing so well. Because we’re all beneficiaries! It's a great show. It's not 'Python' as we would have written it. But then, none of us would get together and write a 'Python' stage show. Eric eventually ran out of patience and said, 'Well, I’ll do it myself then.' He sent us bits and songs and all that and we said, 'Yeah, that's all right, have a go.' But its success is so enormous that it took us all by surprise, including Eric, and now we’re just proud to be associated with it, rather pathetically."

When asked by a Las Vegas Review-Journal reporter in 2008 if he had to be persuaded to provide the recorded voice of God in the musical, John Cleese said, "Yeah, that's right. And in the end I think Spamalot turned out splendidly. It's had a tremendous run. I defy anyone to go and not have a really fun evening. It's the silliest thing I’ve ever seen and I think Eric did a great job."

The last verse of the "Finland"/"Fisch Slapping Dance" was incorporated into a Spam sketch for the 2014 reunion show Monty Python Live (Mostly).

== Critical reception and box-office ==
The original production was a financial success. Variety reported advance ticket sales of $18 million, with ticket prices ranging from $36 to $179.

The show proved to be an early success when moving to London's West End. After high advance ticket sales the show's run was extended by four weeks, four months before the run commenced. The play makes many references to the film and other material in the Python canon, including a line from "The Lumberjack Song", nods to "Ministry of Silly Walks", the "Election Night Special" and "Dead Parrot sketch" routines, a bar from "Spam" worked into "Knights of the Round Table", a rendition of the song "Always Look on the Bright Side of Life" from the film Monty Python's Life of Brian (1979), and the "Fisch Schlapping Song" which is a reference to both "The Fish-Slapping Dance" and the song "Finland". Another reference is actually part of the Playbill of the show; there are several gag pages about a musical entitled "Dik Od Triaanenen Fol (Finns Ain't What They Used to Be)". This gag programme was written by Palin, and echoes the faux-Swedish subtitles in the credits of the original Grail Python film.

Spamalot makes various references to other musicals and musical theatre in general, such as: "The Song That Goes Like This" (a spoof of Andrew Lloyd Webber productions and many other Broadway power ballads); "What Ever Happened to My Part" reminiscent of "And I Am Telling You I'm Not Going" from Dreamgirls, the knights doing a dance reminiscent of Fiddler on the Roof, and another reminiscent of West Side Story (including the music); Sir Lancelot's mimicking of Peter Allen in "His Name Is Lancelot"; the character of Sir Not-Appearing-In-This-Show being Man of La Mancha's Don Quixote; a member of the French "army" dressed as Éponine from Les Misérables; and a line pulled from "Another Hundred People" from Stephen Sondheim's Company by the "damsel" Herbert.

The show has not escaped criticism. In Slate, Sam Anderson wrote, "Python was formed in reaction to exactly the kind of lazy comedy represented by Spamalot — what Michael Palin once described as the 'easy, catch-phrase reaction' the members had all been forced to pander in their previous writing jobs... Spamalot is the gaudy climax of a long, unfunny tradition of post-Python exploitation – books, actions figures, video games – that treats the old material as a series of slogans to be referenced without doing any of the work that made the lines so original in the first place."

About the West End version, Charles Spencer wrote in the Daily Telegraph that "It's a wonderful night, and I fart in the general direction of anyone who says otherwise" (echoing a joke from the show). According to Paul Taylor in The Independent, "it leaves you that high and weak with laughter, thanks not just to the Python provenance of the basic material but to the phenomenal speed, wit, cheek and showbiz knowingness of the direction, which is by the great veteran, Mike Nichols". Michael Billington in the Guardian was less enthusiastic, though, stating "while I'm happy to see musicals spoofed, the show's New York origins are clearly exposed in a would-be outre number which announces 'we won't succeed in show business if we don't have any Jews': a Broadway in-joke that has little purchase this side of the Atlantic." Billington adds, "With hand on heart, I'd much rather watch Lerner and Loewe's Camelot than Eric Idle's smart-arsed Spamalot."

=== Coconut orchestra world record ===
On 22 March 2006, to mark the first anniversary of the official Broadway opening, the "World's Largest Coconut Orchestra", 1,789 people clapping together half coconut shells, performed in Shubert Alley, outside the theatre. The claim was officially recognised by the Guinness Book of World Records. This record was broken by 5,877 people in Trafalgar Square at 7 pm on 23 April 2007, led by the cast from the London production, along with Jones and Gilliam, with the coconuts used in place of the whistles in "Always Look on the Bright Side of Life". This formed part of London's St George's Day celebrations that year and was followed by a screening of Monty Python and the Holy Grail.

=== Other ===
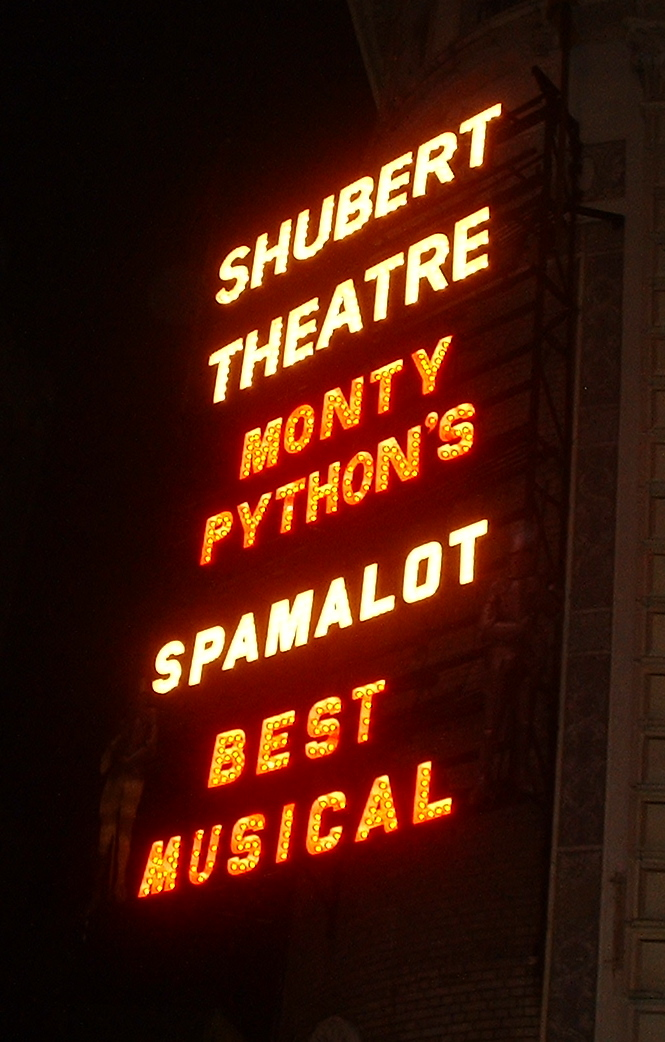
A sign at the Shubert Theatre advertising the show's Best Musical award

In 2006, the London cast of Spamalot performed excerpts at the Royal Variety Performance.

On 10 March 2007, Spamalot partnered with HP Sauce (the classic British brown sauce, now made in the Netherlands following a contentious decision to close its factory in Birmingham, England) to produce 1,075 limited edition bottles featuring a unique Spamalot take on the classic HP design. The bottles were available exclusively via Selfridges, London and came in a presentation box with a numbered certificate. 1,075 was chosen to celebrate, absurdly, "1,075 years of the show running in London".

In July 2007 it was announced that the London production would solve the problem of replacing Hannah Waddingham as the Lady of the Lake through a TV talent show in Sweden. The programme, called West End Star, which began airing on TV3 on 8 December 2007, announced Nina Söderquist as the winner on 2 February 2008. Söderquist took up the role of the Lady of the Lake, with a standing ovation, on 11 February 2008.

=== DVD ===
Portions of the Spamalot original cast recording were featured (with accompanying Flash animation) as a special feature in the 2006 "Extraordinarily Deluxe Two-Disc Edition" DVD re-release of Monty Python and the Holy Grail.

== Awards and nominations ==
In the original Broadway production, in the song "The Diva's Lament", Sara Ramirez sang the line, "I've no Grammy, no reward/I've no Tony Award." Ironically, the show's original cast album won the Grammy Award for Best Musical Theater Album at the 48th Annual Grammy Awards in 2006 and Ramirez won the Tony for Best Featured Actress at the 59th Tony Awards in 2005. The two awards led to a minor change to the song. Initially, the line became "My Tony Award/won't keep me out of Betty Ford's". When Lauren Kennedy took over for Sara Ramirez, it became "My predecessor won awards/and now she's in Betty Ford's", but was later changed to "All our Tony Awards/won't keep me out of Betty Ford's." In the touring production, Pia Glenn sings "All our goddamn awards/won't keep me out of Betty Ford's." For a change, Hannah Waddingham in the West End production sang "I'm as depressed as I can be/I've got constant PMT".

The touring production has garnered Boston's Elliot Norton Award for Outstanding Visiting Production.

=== Original Broadway production ===
| Year | Award | Category | Nominee | Result |
|---|---|---|---|---|
| 2005 | Tony Award | Best Musical | | Won |
| 2005 | Tony Award | Best Book of a Musical | Eric Idle | Nominated |
| 2005 | Tony Award | Best Original Score | John Du Prez and Eric Idle | Nominated |
| 2005 | Tony Award | Best Performance by a Leading Actor in a Musical | Hank Azaria | Nominated |
| 2005 | Tony Award | Best Performance by a Leading Actor in a Musical | Tim Curry | Nominated |
| 2005 | Tony Award | Best Performance by a Featured Actor in a Musical | Michael McGrath | Nominated |
| 2005 | Tony Award | Best Performance by a Featured Actor in a Musical | Christopher Sieber | Nominated |
| 2005 | Tony Award | Best Performance by a Featured Actress in a Musical | Sara Ramirez | Won |
| 2005 | Tony Award | Best Direction of a Musical | Mike Nichols | Won |
| 2005 | Tony Award | Best Choreography | Casey Nicholaw | Nominated |
| 2005 | Tony Award | Best Orchestrations | Larry Hochman | Nominated |
| 2005 | Tony Award | Best Scenic Design | Tim Hatley | Nominated |
| 2005 | Tony Award | Best Costume Design | Tim Hatley | Nominated |
| 2005 | Tony Award | Best Lighting Design | Hugh Vanstone | Nominated |
| 2005 | Drama Desk Award | Outstanding Musical | | Won |
| 2005 | Drama Desk Award | Outstanding Book of a Musical | Eric Idle | Nominated |
| 2005 | Drama Desk Award | Outstanding Actor in a Musical | Hank Azaria | Nominated |
| 2005 | Drama Desk Award | Outstanding Actor in a Musical | David Hyde Pierce | Nominated |
| 2005 | Drama Desk Award | Outstanding Featured Actor in a Musical | Christian Borle | Nominated |
| 2005 | Drama Desk Award | Outstanding Featured Actor in a Musical | Michael McGrath | Nominated |
| 2005 | Drama Desk Award | Outstanding Director of a Musical | Mike Nichols | Nominated |
| 2005 | Drama Desk Award | Outstanding Choreography | Casey Nicholaw | Nominated |
| 2005 | Drama Desk Award | Outstanding Orchestrations | Larry Hochman | Nominated |
| 2005 | Drama Desk Award | Outstanding Lyrics | Eric Idle | Won |
| 2005 | Drama Desk Award | Outstanding Set Design | Tim Hatley | Nominated |
| 2005 | Drama Desk Award | Outstanding Costume Design | Tim Hatley | Won |
| 2005 | Drama League Award | Distinguished Performance | Sara Ramirez | Nominated |
| 2005 | Theatre World Award | | Hank Azaria | Won |
| 2006 | Grammy Award | Best Musical Show Album | | Won |

=== Original London production ===
| Year | Award | Category | Nominee | Result |
|---|---|---|---|---|
| 2007 | Laurence Olivier Award | Best New Musical | | Nominated |
| 2007 | Laurence Olivier Award | Best Actor in a Musical | Tim Curry | Nominated |
| 2007 | Laurence Olivier Award | Best Actress in a Musical | Hannah Waddingham | Nominated |
| 2007 | Laurence Olivier Award | Best Performance in a Supporting Role in a Musical | Tom Goodman-Hill | Nominated |
| 2007 | Laurence Olivier Award | Best Set Design | Tim Hatley | Nominated |
| 2007 | Laurence Olivier Award | Best Costume Design | Tim Hatley | Nominated |
| 2007 | Laurence Olivier Award | Best Lighting Design | Hugh Vanstone | Nominated |

=== 2023 Kennedy Center production ===
| Year | Award | Category | Nominee | Result |
|---|---|---|---|---|
| 2024 | Helen Hayes Award | Outstanding Production - Musical | | Nominated |
| 2024 | Helen Hayes Award | Outstanding Choreography in a Musical | John Rhodes | Nominated |
| 2024 | Helen Hayes Award | Outstanding Musical Direction | John Bell | Nominated |
| 2024 | Helen Hayes Award | Outstanding Director of a Musical | Josh Rhodes | Nominated |
| 2024 | Helen Hayes Award | Outstanding Ensemble in a Musical | | Nominated |
| 2024 | Helen Hayes Award | Outstanding Supporting Performer in a Musical | Michael Urie | Nominated |
| 2024 | Helen Hayes Award | Outstanding Supporting Performer in a Musical | Rob McClure | Nominated |
| 2024 | Helen Hayes Award | Outstanding Supporting Performer in a Musical | Leslie Rodriguez Kritzer | Nominated |

=== 2023 Broadway revival ===
| Year | Award | Category | Nominee | Result |
|---|---|---|---|---|
| 2024 | Tony Award | Best Featured Actress in a Musical | Leslie Rodriguez Kritzer | Nominated |
| 2024 | Drama Desk Award | Outstanding Featured Performance in a Musical | Leslie Rodriguez Kritzer | Nominated |
| 2024 | Drama League Award | Outstanding Revival of a Musical | | Nominated |
| 2024 | Drama League Award | Distinguished Performance | Leslie Rodriguez Kritzer | Nominated |
| 2024 | Outer Critics Circle Awards | Outstanding Revival of a Musical | | Nominated |
| 2024 | Outer Critics Circle Awards | Outstanding Featured Performer in a Broadway Musical | Leslie Rodriguez Kritzer | Nominated |

== Television ==
A special edition of The South Bank Show was a television documentary on the history of Spamalot. It features numerous segments with Eric Idle and John Du Prez explaining the process of writing the songs, plus interviews with UK and US cast members. It included scenes from the rehearsal of the West End show, and was first broadcast on 15 October 2006.

== Cancelled film adaptation ==
In May 2018, 20th Century Fox announced a film adaptation was in the works with Idle writing the script and Casey Nicholaw attached to direct. The film was reportedly fast-tracked with casting announced soon and shooting to begin in early 2019. The next month it was reported that the studio was looking to cast Benedict Cumberbatch as King Arthur, Peter Dinklage as his servant Patsy and Tiffany Haddish as the Lady of the Lake. Cumberbatch was taken out of consideration due to his involvement in Doctor Strange in the Multiverse of Madness.

At the time of the release of his memoir Always Look on the Bright Side of Life: A Sortabiography in December 2019, Idle said in an interview with the Los Angeles Times that "(the movie is) all ready to go" and that it "is not very expensive". He cited the acquisition of 21st Century Fox by Disney as a factor to the film's delay, saying it caused "everything (to come) to a grinding halt". He also stated in an interview around the same time with WBUR-FM that Haddish is still being offered the role of the Lady of the Lake, and that the script has "mostly been solved".

On 6 January 2021, it was announced that the project would move to Paramount Pictures and that it was set to begin pre-production, with Nicholaw officially confirmed to direct from Idle's script. On 28 February 2023, Idle said on Twitter that the film would not be happening due to the veto of his former Monty Python colleagues.

== Lawsuit ==
In 2013, the Pythons lost a legal case to Mark Forstater, the producer of Monty Python and the Holy Grail, over royalties for Spamalot. He was paid 1/14 of the portion of the profits paid to the Pythons. The court ruled that he was a full Python partner and was to be paid 1/7 of the portion paid to the Pythons. They owed a combined £800,000 in legal fees and back royalties to Forstater, prompting them to produce Monty Python Live (Mostly).
