= Adam Russell Taylor =

American activist, speaker, and non-profit executive

- Education: Virginia Union University; Emory University; Harvard Kennedy School

Adam Russell Taylor is president of Sojourners, a Christian nonprofit organization focused on the biblical call to social justice. He is also the author of A More Perfect Union: A New Vision for Building the Beloved Community and Mobilizing Hope: Faith-Inspired Activism for a Post Civil Rights Generation. Taylor is ordained in the American Baptist Church and Progressive National Baptist Convention.

== Early career and education ==
Taylor previously served as the vice president in charge of advocacy at World Vision U.S., as well as the executive director at Global Justice. He also led the Faith Initiative at the World Bank Group.

From 2009 to 2010, Taylor was a White House Fellow, serving in the White House Office of Cabinet Affairs, Intergovernmental Affairs, and Public Engagement. Taylor is also a member of the inaugural class of the Aspen Institute Civil Society Fellowship.

Taylor is a graduate of Emory University, the Harvard University Kennedy School of Government, and the Samuel DeWitt Proctor School of Theology.

== Sojourners ==
Taylor has been president of Sojourners since November 2020. He is the first president since founder Jim Wallis, and the organization's first African-American president. He formerly served as the chair of the board and as the senior political director and executive director.

As president of Sojourners, Taylor regularly appears as a speaker at colleges and universities, denominational meetings, faith conferences, and other gatherings.

=== Advocacy ===
Taylor's work largely focuses on issues such as racial justice, economic justice, voting rights, global development and human rights, and immigration, as well as building Martin Luther King Jr.'s and other civil rights leaders' vision of the Beloved Community.

Taylor is involved with several advocacy groups, including the Circle of Protection, a coalition of church leaders working to address poverty and hunger through advocacy work. Together, the church bodies in the Circle of Protection have close to 100 million members. In February 2021, the Circle of Protection sent a letter to the Biden administration and members of Congress calling for another round of COVID-19 relief legislation. When sending out that letter, Taylor said, "The moral obligation of this nation to combat the pandemic is a moral imperative for Christians." Taylor is also involved with the Faiths4Vaccines campaign, a multifaith coalition of religious leaders and medical professionals working to resolve gaps in vaccine outreach.

==== Black Lives Matter movement ====
Following the murder of George Floyd, Taylor wrote, "As a father of two black sons, I can’t breathe today because I refuse to accept a law enforcement system that so often treats black bodies as being presumed guilty or an immediate danger." On June 2, 2020, he and Wallis criticized then-President Donald Trump for tear gassing peaceful protestors in order to take a picture holding a Bible in front of St. John's Episcopal Church.

In July 2021, Taylor called for a "modern-day equivalent of the Freedom Summer," arguing that American democracy was at stake.

==== 2020 election and aftermath ====
Taylor helped to lead Sojourners' Lawyers & Collars initiative, which, through a partnership with the Skinner Leadership Institute and the National African-American Clergy Network, mobilized faith leaders to advocate for voting rights and act as a moral presence at voting sites across the country. On Election Day, he served as a poll chaplain in Philadelphia.

In response to the 2020 United States presidential election results, Taylor said, "We look forward to working with the new Administration to boldly address the COVID pandemic, systematic racism, economic justice, and climate change as core matters of faith even as we work together to heal our nation from deep polarization."

Following the 2021 United States Capitol attack, Taylor said, "Jan. 6 was a wake-up moment for many within the church about the poisonous danger of white supremacy and Christian nationalism, including among many more conservative Christians." On January 7, 2021, he and Wallis called for Trump to be removed from office.

== Personal life ==
Taylor is married to Sharee Mckenzie Taylor. Together, they have two children. Taylor is a member of Alpha Phi Alpha fraternity and serves in ministry at the Alfred Street Baptist Church in Alexandria, VA.
