= Public Religion Research Institute =

American nonprofit that conducts public opinion polls

- Established: 2009; 17 years ago
- CEO: Melissa Deckman
- Address: 1023 15TH ST NW, 9th Floor; Washington, D.C. 20005
- Location: Washington, D.C., U.S.
- Website: prri.org

The Public Religion Research Institute (PRRI) is an American nonprofit, nonpartisan research and education organization that conducts public opinion polls on a variety of topics, specializing in the quantitative and qualitative study of political issues as they relate to religious values. Studies and data produced by the PRRI have been used in a variety of peer-reviewed scholarly analyses of religion and American culture, including studies on economic inequality and questions of redistribution, attitudes toward immigration, attitudes toward climate change, and religious attitudes toward social prejudice.

== Major research ==
In 2014, PRRI launched the American Values Atlas, an interactive online tool that provides information about religious, political and demographic composition for all 50 states and particular issues.

== Robert P. Jones ==
Robert P. Jones is the founder of PRRI. He previously served as assistant professor of Religious Studies at Missouri State University. Jones holds a Ph.D. in Religion from Emory University and a M.Div. from Southwestern Baptist Theological Seminary. He is the author of The End of White Christian America (2016), which won the 2019 Grawemeyer Award in Religion. Jones is also the author of the 2020 book White Too Long: The Legacy of White Supremacy in American Christianity.
