= Sojourners =

Progressive magazine published in the United States

- May 2011 cover of Sojourners
- Editor-in-Chief Editor: Julie Polter; Jim Rice
- President: Adam Russell Taylor
- Categories: Christian magazines
- Frequency: Monthly
- Publisher: Sojourners
- Founded: 1971
- Country: United States
- Based in: Washington, D.C.
- Language: English
- Website: sojo.net
- ISSN: 0364-2097

Sojourners is a progressive monthly magazine and daily online publication of the American Christian social justice organization Sojourners, which arose out of the Sojourners Community. It was first published in 1971 under the original title of The Post-American. The magazine and online publication feature reporting, commentary, and analysis on Christianity and politics, the church and social issues, social justice, and Christian living. Articles frequently feature coverage of fair trade, interfaith dialogue, peacemaking, and work to alleviate poverty. The offices of the magazine are in Washington, D.C.

Julie Polter has served as editor-in-chief since September 2022. She followed Sandi Villarreal, who was named in August 2020. Adam Russell Taylor succeeded founder Jim Wallis as president in November 2020.

== History ==
Sojourners magazine was originally published in 1971 under the name The Post American, coming out of the Sojourners Community. The name was changed to Sojourners in 1975, when the community moved from Trinity Evangelical Divinity School in Deerfield, Illinois, to Columbia Heights in Washington, D.C. The mission of Sojourners is "to articulate the biblical call to social justice, inspiring hope and building a movement to transform individuals, communities, the church, and the world."

The magazine was originally published quarterly, then every other month, and since January 2004 has been published eleven times per year, with a single issue published for September and October.

The Sojourners Collection is maintained by Wheaton College in its archives and special collections. Collected materials include magazine issues, correspondence, original manuscripts and administrative papers, as well as information on the Sojourners Community, founder Wallis, and other communities and organizations affiliated with the publisher.

== Other activities ==
Along with the magazine, Sojourners also produces a website, sojo.net.

In 2010, Wallis was interviewed in episode six of God in America, a documentary featured on PBS from Frontline and American Experience.

Sojourners CEO Wallis served as a member of President Barack Obama's Advisory Council on Faith-Based and Community Partnerships, which advises the president and White House staff on a range of concerns. Sojourners has organized high-level meetings with the White House and political leaders on both sides of the aisle.

== Recent work ==
=== Responding to the global economic crisis ===
Wallis's latest book, published in January 2010, is Rediscovering Values: On Wall Street, Main Street and Your Street. As part of his nationwide book tour, Wallis was interviewed on The Daily Show with Jon Stewart, Morning Joe on MSNBC, and PBS's The Tavis Smiley Show. The Jon Stewart interview and the first chapter of Wallis's book, "Sunday School with Jon Stewart", are on their sojo.net website.

=== Immigration reform ===
Sojourners is leading faith groups in support of comprehensive immigration work through its Christians for Comprehensive Immigration Reform campaign. As a June 2010 Brookings Institution panel on "Religious Activism and the Debate over Immigration Reform" affirmed, "largely because of the activism of these religious groups, immigration has remained on a legislative agenda crowded with other pressing domestic concerns." A Sojourners letter to President Obama – calling for leadership on immigration reform that reflects the nation's best values – was signed by more than 40 prominent faith leaders and 28 national organizations. Sojourners was one of the primary faith organizers of the March 21, 2010, national immigration rally that brought 200,000 people to Washington, D.C. As part of a coalition of evangelical groups, Sojourners came out in full support for a path to citizenship for illegal immigrants as part of any immigration reform legislation in the United States on March 18, 2013. Wallis stated that it was part of a "sea change" in the evangelical community, driven in part by the increasing numbers of immigrants in congregations. He went on to state that evangelical leaders have concluded that "we don't believe there are second-class images of God, and therefore we don't believe in a second-class status for people who are willing to follow an earned path to citizenship."

=== Climate change, green energy, and the Gulf oil spill ===
Sojourners urged constituents to reduce energy use and advocate for laws that hold polluters accountable, support green energy technology, and prioritize people and the planet above corporate interests. It mobilized its grassroots base and engaged in advocacy at the highest levels in support of action to stop climate change. Faith leaders called for increasing funding from Congress to help the most vulnerable communities worldwide who are affected by climate change. Wallis led a delegation of faith leaders who traveled to the Gulf of Mexico for a listening tour sponsored by the Sierra Club. A reporter from CNN participated in the delegation and covered the Gulf Coast tour.

=== LGBTQ ===
In 2011, the Sojourners website, sojo.net, rejected a Mother's Day advertisement from Believe Out Loud that featured a same-sex couple.

Author Becky Garrison wrote that she "lost [her] position on the Sojourners masthead for protesting their rejection of an LGBT welcome ad."

However, in 2013, editor-in-chief Jim Wallis, said: "Marriage needs some strengthening. Let's start with marriage, and then I think we have to talk about, now, how to include same-sex couples in that deeper understanding of marriage".

=== Countering extremism ===
Wallis and other faith leaders played an important behind-the-scenes role in preventing the Quran burning by pastor Terry Jones on September 11, 2010. Wallis's opinion piece in The Washington Post's "Sunday Outlook" section describes the role he and other faith leaders played. The article also highlights how the welcoming stance of a church in Tennessee had global implications in Pakistan and what that could teach us about interfaith understanding and fighting terrorism. The column was reprinted in newspapers globally, including in publications with predominantly Muslim audiences.
