= Joy Carroll Wallis =

British Anglican priest

Joy Carroll Wallis is an English Anglican priest who was a vicar in London for 10 years. She was one of the first women ordained as priest in the Church of England in 1994.

In 1997, Carroll married American theologian and writer Jim Wallis. They have two sons, Luke and Jack.

Wallis was adviser, inspiration and role model for Richard Curtis' television series The Vicar of Dibley. Her book, Beneath the Cassock: the Real-life Vicar of Dibley, describes her life as a vicar. She later wrote another autobiography, The Woman Behind the Collar. After moving to the United States, she was licensed as a priest of the Episcopal Church.

== Publications ==
- "The Importance of The Vicar of Dibley"
- Carroll, Joy (2002). Beneath the Cassock: The Real-life Vicar of Dibley. London: HarperCollins. ISBN 0007122071. OCLC 50783852.
- Wallis, Joy Carroll (2004). The Woman Behind the Collar: The Pioneering Journey of an Episcopal Priest. New York City: Crossroad. ISBN 0824522656. OCLC 53814103.
