= God's Politics =

2005 book by Jim Wallis

God's Politics: Why the Right Gets It Wrong and the Left Doesn't Get It
- Author: Jim Wallis
- Language: English
- Genre: Non-fiction
- Publication date: 2005
- Publication place: United States

God's Politics: Why the Right Gets It Wrong and the Left Doesn't Get It is a 2005 book by author Jim Wallis. The book focuses on the role of religious hypocrisy in politics, and critiques both the so-called "religious right" and the "secular left" while noting that the vast majority on the "left" have families who embrace both family values and religion. His criticism includes quotations from the Bible, as he accuses U.S. President George W. Bush and many at Fox News such as Bill O'Reilly and Sean Hannity of practicing bad theology, noting that Jesus was strictly nonviolent particularly when it comes to invading other countries such as Iraq where over 600,000 civilians are estimated to have been killed due to the U.S. invasion, while Jesus said more about social justice while he never said anything against homosexuality. He defends religion in general, and challenges organizations such as the American Civil Liberties Union for overreacting to public displays of religion, although the Founding Fathers of the U.S. clearly intended separation of church and state.
