= Sojourners Community =

American residential Christian community

The Sojourners Community is an intentional community that was started in the early 1970s by a group of students at Trinity Evangelical Divinity School. The founders had the desire to further explore the relationship between their orthodox Protestant faith and the social crisis that surrounded them, particularly around the Vietnam War. In the fall of 1971, they began publishing the Post American, a newspaper that expressed the group's commitment to the faith and ideas about social change. The Sojourners Community is most widely known for Sojourners magazine and for the writing and speaking of its founding member Jim Wallis.

== History ==
In the summer of 1971, the group organized an intentional community in Rogers Park, Illinois. However, in 1974, the community disintegrated. The remaining members decided to move to the inner-city neighborhood of Columbia Heights, Washington, D.C., where they could better address urban problems and national politics. Combining their assets and incomes, the group gradually established households and a network of social outreach programs. The community lived together in these common households, shared a common purse, formed a worshiping community, got involved in neighborhood issues, organized national events on behalf of peace and justice and continued to publish Sojourners magazine. The vestige of the Sojourners' intentional living community remains its intern community, a group of individuals who are hired as year-long interns and who live together in intentional Christian community for that year as part of the internship experience.

Other Evangelicals have critiqued the Sojourners Community due to their combination of strict evangelical Protestant beliefs (though the Sojourners living community and wider organizational network has also long included mainline Protestants and Catholics) and radical "social priorities [which] run in markedly different directions". Also, Sojourners differentiates from other evangelicals in its condemning of militarism, corporate excesses, and the exploitation of people in the Third World. However, other social critiques are similar to those of other evangelicals on issues such as condemning of abortion (as part of a wider pro-life stance that includes protection of life from conception to grave, i.e. anti-war and anti-hunger stances). Sojourners advocates economic justice and expanded services for the poor.
