= Knights Who Say "Ni!" =

Monty Python characters

The head knight, as portrayed by Michael Palin

The Knights Who Say "Ni!", also called the Knights of Ni, are a band of knights encountered by King Arthur and his followers in the 1975 film Monty Python and the Holy Grail and the play Spamalot. They demonstrate their power by shouting "Ni!" (pronounced /niː/ NEE), terrifying the party, whom they refuse to allow passage through their forest unless appeased through the gift of a shrubbery.

== Description ==
The knights appear silhouetted in a misty wood, wearing robes and horned helmets; their full number is never apparent, but there are at least six. The leader of the knights, played by Michael Palin, is the only one who speaks to the party. He is nearly double Arthur's height, and wears a great helm decorated with long antlers. The other knights are large, but of human proportions, and wear visored sallet helmets decorated with cow horns. The knight explains that they are the "keepers of the sacred words 'Ni', 'Peng', and 'Neee-Wom'". Arthur confides to Sir Bedivere, "those who hear them seldom live to tell the tale!"

== Tasks ==
The knights demand a sacrifice, and when Arthur states that he merely wishes to pass through the woods, the knights begin shouting "Ni!", forcing the party to shrink back in fear. After this demonstration of their power, the head knight threatens to say "Ni!" again unless the travellers appease them with a shrubbery; otherwise they shall never pass through the wood alive. When Arthur questions the demand, the knights again shout "Ni!" until the travellers agree to bring them a shrubbery, which the head knight specifies must be "one that looks nice. And not too expensive."

To fulfill their promise to the Knights of Ni, the party visits a small village, where Arthur and Bedivere ask an old crone where they can obtain a shrubbery. The woman questions them, and Arthur admits that it is for the Knights Who Say "Ni!", whereupon she refuses to cooperate. Arthur then threatens to say "Ni!" to the old woman unless she helps them, and when she still refuses, begins shouting "Ni!". Bedivere has trouble saying the sacred word, which he pronounces "Nu!" until Arthur demonstrates the correct technique. As the crone shrinks back from their combined assault, they are interrupted by Roger the Shrubber, who laments the lack of law and order that allows ruffians to say "Ni!" to an old woman. Arthur obtains a shrubbery from Roger, and brings it to the Knights of Ni.

The head knight acknowledges that "it is a good shrubbery", but asserts that the knights cannot allow Arthur and his followers to pass through the wood because they are no longer the Knights Who Say "Ni!", now being the Knights Who Say "Ekke Ekke Ekke Ekke Ptang Zoo Boing!", (Note: There are several slight variations in spelling based on different sources; this spelling is based on the film subtitles, which give "Zoo" rather than "Zoom"; the end of this word is indistinctly pronounced in the film. The subtitles only include three "Ekkes", but four can definitely be heard in the dialogue. This line appears to have been semi-improvisational, and may differ from the original script and later versions, with "Ni!" sometimes being added at the end. Despite the head knight's pronouncement of the new name, some of the other knights still chatter "Ni!" in the background.) and must therefore give Arthur a test. Unable to pronounce the new name, Arthur addresses them as "Knights who until recently said 'Ni!'", inquiring as to the nature of the test.

The head knight demands another shrubbery, to be placed next to but slightly higher than the first; and then Arthur "must cut down the mightiest tree in the forest—with a herring!" The knight presents a herring to be used. Arthur objects, asserting that "it can't be done!" upon which the knights recoil as though in fear and pain. It soon emerges that the knights are unable to withstand the word "it", which Arthur's party is unable to avoid saying. The knights are soon incapacitated by the word, which even the head knight cannot stop repeating, allowing Arthur, Bedivere, and their squires to make their escape.

In Spamalot, Arthur, accompanied only by his squire Patsy, meets the knights, who make the same initial demand for a shrubbery. Afterwards, the head knight demands that Arthur and Sir Robin put on a musical, but not one by Andrew Lloyd Webber, whose name causes the Knights Who Say "Ni!" to scream in pain the way the word "it" does in the film.

== Film notes ==
In the original screenplay, it was suggested that the head knight be played by "Mike standing on John's shoulders". In the DVD commentary for the film, Michael Palin states that their use of the word "Ni!" was derived from The Goon Show. Later, Palin gave another inspiration—his history teacher at Shrewsbury School, Laurence Le Quesne, who had the habit of saying "Ni" while searching for books. Upon Arthur's return, the knights were to have said, "Neeeow...wum...ping!"

== Contemporary scholarship ==
The Knights who say "Ni!" have been cited as an example of intentional disregard for historical accuracy in neo-medievalism, which may be contrasted with the casual disregard for historical accuracy inherent in more traditional works of the fantasy genre. However, in Medievalisms: Making the Past in the Present, the authors suggest that the original characters of Monty Python and the Holy Grail actually represent medievalism, rather than neo-medievalism, as many of the film's details are in fact based on authentic medieval texts and ideas. With respect to the Knights who say "Ni!", the authors suggest that Sir Bedivere's difficulty pronouncing "Ni!", despite its levity, "carries a very learned joke about the difficulties of pronouncing Middle English", alluding to the Great Vowel Shift, which occurred in English during the late medieval period.
