= America's Original Sin =

2015 book

America's Original Sin: Racism, White Privilege, and the Bridge to a New America
- First edition (with image of Edmund Pettus Bridge)
- Author: Jim Wallis
- Language: English
- Subject: Race in the United States
- Publisher: Baker Publishing Group
- Publication date: 2015
- Publication place: United States
- Media type: Print, eBook

America's Original Sin: Racism, White Privilege, and the Bridge to a New America is a 2015 book by Jim Wallis.

== Summary ==
The book calls for Americans to overcome racism in the United States, issuing an appeal rooted in fundamental Christian values. It argues in favor of telling the truth about the American past, suggesting that this is essential to national redemption. The book also discusses the concept of white privilege, arguing that it constitutes a sin.

== See also ==
- Dear White People
- Black Lives Matter
- White People – 2015 film exploring white privilege
