= Tom Deckman =

American stage and screen actor

- Born: January 26, 1979 (age 47); Rochester, New York
- Education: McQuaid Jesuit High School; Fordham University
- Occupation: actor
- Awards: 2007 nominated, Helen Hayes Award, Best Supporting Actor for Spamalot
- Website: www.tomdeckman.com

Tom Deckman is an American stage and screen actor. He is a member of Actors' Equity Association.

He played The Historian, Not Dead Fred, French Guard, Minstrel, and Prince Herbert in the Broadway production of Monty Python's Spamalot.

He played Thurio and Cupid in Two Gentlemen of Verona (musical) at Shakespeare Theatre Company's Harman Hall (2012). Previously, he played: on Broadway in Monty Python's Spamalot (Sam S. Shubert Theatre) and Good Vibrations (Eugene O'Neill Theatre); at Carnegie Hall in South Pacific in Concert (2005–2006); at City Center Encores! Bye Bye Birdie (musical) (2004); at New York's York Theatre in Best Foot Forward (Musicals in Mufti Concert, 2004). He appeared in the world premiere of It Should Have Been You (directed by David Hyde Pierce) at the George Street Playhouse (2011), and at the New York City Opera in Dead Man Walking. He also performed in Good Vibrations in regional theater (2004–2005). He has also appeared at the Downstairs Cabaret Theatre (in Grease), Goodspeed Opera House, Bay Street Theatre (Hair), Fulton Opera House (Into the Woods), and Orpheum Theatre (San Francisco) (White Christmas). He has been seen on television in Salon Confidential, Blue Bloods, Sex and the City, Law and Order: SVU, and Hope and Faith.

He also appeared in a teen.com web series, Haute and Bothered (2009).

Deckman performed Characters I coulda nailed! solo, once, July 5, 2010 at Pope Auditorium, Lincoln Center. It was to benefit the Fordham Alumni Theatre Company. He is a teacher at the Harley School in Brighton, New York.

Appearances on the stage
Play	Role(s)	Remarks	Venue	Where	When
Two Gentlemen of Verona (musical)	Thurio, Cupid	concert staging	Shakespeare Theatre Company, Sidney Harman Hall	Washington, DC	January 27–29, 2012
It Shoulda Been You	(Walt/Uncle Morty)		George Street Playhouse	New Brunswick, NJ	October 4 - November 6, 2011
How to Succeed in Business Without Really Trying	(Bud Frump)		Goodspeed Musicals, Goodspeed Opera House	East Haddam, CT	September 24 - November 28, 2010
What May Fall	(performer)		Pope Auditorium at Fordham University	New York, NY	July 24–31, 2010
Irving Berlin's White Christmas	(Mike Nulty)		7 cities in 5 states	United States	November 1, 2009 - January 10, 2010
Spamalot First National Tour	(Historian / Not Dead Fred / FrenchGuard / Minstrel / Prince Herbert)		33 cities in 24 states	United States	March 7, 2006 - October 18, 2009
Into the Woods	(Jack)		Fulton Theatre	Lancaster, PA	September 8–25, 2005
Monty Python's Spamalot	(Prince Herbert / Minstrel / French Guard / Not Dead Fred / Historian)		Shubert Theatre	New York, NY	February 14, 2005 - January 11, 2009
Good Vibrations	(Ensemble / Giggles Manager / Class President)		Eugene O'Neill Theatre	New York, NY	February 2 - April 24, 2005
Bye Bye Birdie	(performer)		City Center Encores! Great American Musicals in Concert, New York City Center Mainstage Theater	New York, NY	2004
Hair: The American Tribal Love-Rock Musical	(Woof)		Bay Street Theatre	Sag Harbor, NY	June - August, 2001
