= Melissa Deckman =

American political scientist

- Education: St. Mary's College of Maryland; American University
- Scientific career
- Fields: Political science
- Workplaces: American University; Washington College

Melissa Deckman is an American political scientist. She is the Louis L. Goldstein Professor of Public Affairs at Washington College, where she has also been Chair of the Political Science Department. She studies religion, gender, and American politics. Her research includes books on women and politics, the political activities of clergy members in the United States, and the role of women in the Tea Party movement. She is the CEO of the Public Religion Research Institute.

== Career ==
In recent years, Deckman published the book on School board battles: The Christian right in local politics. In School board battles, Deckman studies the Christian right movement that fielded local school board candidates in an attempt to combat what it saw as a left-wing political bias in American public school districts. She employs both a cross-sectional national survey of 671 school board candidates, of whom 127 were affiliated with the Christian right movement, as well as case studies in Garrett County, Maryland, and Fairfax County, Virginia, to study the differences between the Christian right candidates and other candidates. Although Deckman's study confirmed certain differences between candidates who were not affiliated with the Christian right and those who were, it also contradicted the conventional wisdom that Christian right candidates were dramatically different from other candidates, particularly with respect to the funding of and motivation for their campaigns.

In 2005, Deckman published Women with a mission: Gender, religion, and the politics of women clergy with Sue E. S. Crawford and Laura R. Olson. The authors present data on the political activities of clergy members and rabbis, including 54 interviews conducted in Indianapolis, Omaha, Milwaukee, and Washington D.C. supplemented by data from the national survey of clergy members in the 2000 Cooperative Clergy Project, to study the political role of clergy and how gender affects this role. They demonstrate that women members of the clergy tend to be politically motivated by progressive goals such as social justice and fighting discrimination. They also study the relationship between the clergy members' political roles and that of their religious denomination and congregation.

Deckman co-authored the 2006 book Women and politics: Paths to power and political influence together Julie Dolan and Michele Swers, a textbook on women and politics that had been published in four editions by 2019. Deckman was also the co-editor with Joseph Prud'homme of Curriculum and the culture war: When and where is the Bible appropriate in public schools?, published in 2014.

From 2012 to 2014, Deckman was an affiliated scholar of the Public Religion Research Institute, and starting in 2013 was a member of its board of directors.

Deckman published another book, Tea party women: Mama grizzlies, grassroots leaders, and the changing face of the American right, in 2016. Tea party women studies how women became leaders in the American Tea Party movement through the Mama grizzly archetype associated with Sarah Palin. Through detailed interviews with women involved in Tea Party activism, Deckman argues that the Tea Party functioned as a novel mechanism for women to enter Republican Party politics despite other barriers to their participation.

In recent years, Deckman has published a book on "The politics of Gen Z: How the Youngest Voters will Shape our Democracy" in 2024. She looks into how in recently, Gen Z, those born between 1997 and 2012, have been affected by the widespread political changes that have taken place in the United States.

Deckman has been quoted, or her work has been cited, in news outlets like The New York Times, The Washington Post, The Baltimore Sun, and Vox.

== Selected works ==
- "Balancing work and family responsibilities: Flextime and child care in the federal government", Public Administration Review, with Marni Ezra (1996)
- School board battles: The Christian right in local politics (2004)
- Women with a mission: Gender, religion, and the politics of women clergy, with Sue E. S. Crawford and Melissa M. Deckman (2005)
- Women and politics: Paths to power and political influence, with Julie Dolan and Michele Swers (2006)
- Tea party women: Mama grizzlies, grassroots leaders, and the changing face of the American right (2016)
