= Portrayals of God in popular media =

Portrayals of God in popular media have varied from a white-haired old man in Oh, God! to a woman in Dogma, from an entirely off-screen character to a figure of fun. According to trinitarian Christianity, Jesus Christ is God, so cultural depictions of Jesus in film and television also portray God.

== Religious views on portraying God ==
Islam and Judaism both prohibit pictorial representations of God. However, television and Hollywood cinema emerged from a largely Christian tradition—whilst it shared the prohibition on idolatry was more relaxed about religious iconography—and the many cultural depictions of God in that tradition that preceded the invention of television and cinema.

Whilst even the humorous portrayals of God are rarely irreverent, portraying God is not without controversy. The animated television series God, the Devil, and Bob portrayed God as being a beer-swilling, ex-hippie character who closely resembled The Grateful Dead guitarist Jerry Garcia, which raised objections from fundamentalist Christian groups in the United States, causing the show to be pulled from broadcasting in the United States after just 3 episodes (although the entire series was broadcast in the United Kingdom).

One of the last films that British activist Mary Whitehouse campaigned against was Irvine Welsh's The Granton Star Cause, which portrayed God as drunken and abusive. Ironically, the campaign backfired, only serving to advertise the film more widely.

== Casting and acting the role of God ==
The role of God is a difficult one to play, and also a difficult one to cast. The casting of Alanis Morissette as God in Dogma was influenced by the singer's own public dialogue with her faith, as expressed in her songs. Ella Shohat observes that God is a "rare challenge" for actors, raising the questions of how a method actor could possibly prepare for the part, and what possible personal feelings or experiences an actor could draw upon to portray a character that is omniscient, omnipotent, and the creator of the universe.

God has largely been cast as white and male, Morgan Freeman, Alanis Morissette, Ken Jeong and Jamie Foxx being exceptions to this, that line up alongside William Keighley's 1936 film The Green Pastures, where all characters, including God, are played by African American actors (Rex Ingram in the case of what the film calls "De Lawd"). The opening prologue of that film included what amounted to a disclaimer to make the film palatable to the white audiences in the United States of the time, asserting that:

God appears in many forms to those who believe in him. Thousands of Negroes in the Deep South visualize God and Heaven in terms of people and things they know in their everyday life. The Green Pastures is an attempt to portray that humble, reverent conception.

— The Green Pastures

A similarly unusual piece of casting is seen in Lars von Trier's 1996 film Breaking the Waves, where God is a woman and identical to the film's protagonist.

Whilst in silent films, the voice of God was simply an on-screen written caption, in the talkies, God's voice has presented a particular casting challenge, in biblical epics especially, since vocal intonation and accent carry implications of class, gender, and race. Although in both the Bible and the Qur'an God speaks, that voice is nowhere described. A filmmaker thus faces a choice about the voice to use, with no scriptural guidance to work from. This conflicts with the filmmaker's perceived task, in the case of biblical epics, of presenting scripture without interpretation or exegesis.

God's voice is generally cast in biblical epics and similar films to provide a sense of authority. It is deep, resonant, and masculine, and usually the American English of Southern California (sometimes with a touch of British English). One unique approach used by the film Switch, was to have God as two voices, one male and one female, speaking simultaneously. Director John Huston provided the voice of God in his 1966 epic The Bible: In the Beginning.

== Different portrayals ==
God has in fact been portrayed in film ever since the days of silent cinema, in biblical epics, experimental films, everyday dramas, and comedies. A cantankerous animated God instructs King Arthur and his knights with their mission in the 1975 comedy Monty Python and the Holy Grail. Robert Mitchum portrayed a cigar-smoking, American, God in Frédéric Fonteyne's 1992 comedy Les Sept péchés capitaux. A suicidal supreme being identified as "God Killing Himself" expires in an act of self-disembowelment in E. Elias Merhige's 1989 avant-garde feature Begotten. In Carlos Diegues' 2003 film Deus é Brasileiro, God is a down-to-Earth character, exhausted from his labours, who is resting in the northeast of Brazil.

God as a character is often mentioned or intervenes in the plot of the CW show Supernatural, and eventually served as the series' ultimate villain. He seems as a loving, smart, serious, strategic, all-seeing, father, who observes events play out, but ignores them unless he absolutely needs to fix something. God has also been portrayed by actor Dennis Haysbert in the DC Comics-based show Lucifer starting in 2020 and 2021.

=== Oblique portrayals ===
One new portrayal of God was in the television series Joan of Arcadia. In that series, God is portrayed, in accordance with the programme's theme song (Joan Osborne's "One of Us"), as simply a proverbial "stranger on a bus". God is portrayed as taking on human form in various shapes, from a piano tuner to a telephone repairman. Neuhaus characterizes this portrayal as an "unknowable but visible God, who sees and is seen and is among us always, in all forms, participating in our everyday life but not interfering with humanity's free will, and who nonetheless calls us into service". This portrayal was criticized in the first series for being ecumenical, almost to the point of being secular. The creator, Barbara Hall, set out how God would be portrayed in some directives to the series' writers, named the "Ten Commandments of Joan of Arcadia". Thus, in the words of Amber Tamblyn, Joan of Arcadia is "not religious, we're philosophical". Neuhaus deduces that this portrayal of God was partly motivated by the fact that Joan of Arcadia is a television show, a product that has to appeal to a broad range of viewers. Thus, as portrayed in the show, God does not call for proselytisation. Similarly, the portrayal of God is prepared to poke fun at Christian doctrine. Further, Joan of Arcadia's God spurns the supernatural.

A more oblique portrayal of God occurs in the television series Wonderfalls, where God appears not as a person but as a series of inanimate objects that lead the series's protagonist to perform good works in other people's lives. The word "God" is never mentioned in the show in relation to these encounters.

=== Off-screen portrayals ===
Some portrayals of God are entirely off-screen. For example, the God who gives the stone tablets to Moses in The Ten Commandments is, in Paul Schrader's commentary to the film, "off-screen to the right". Such biblical epics have less trouble with this obliquity than non-biblical works. This is because whilst there is no visual representation of God himself in the source text that such films are based upon, there are visually representable elements that can be used, from burning bushes to clouds and fire, in the manifestations of God. So, whilst biblical epics are constrained by their source text to aniconism, they are not denied spectacle.
