= Jim Wallis =

American activist and Evangelical writer

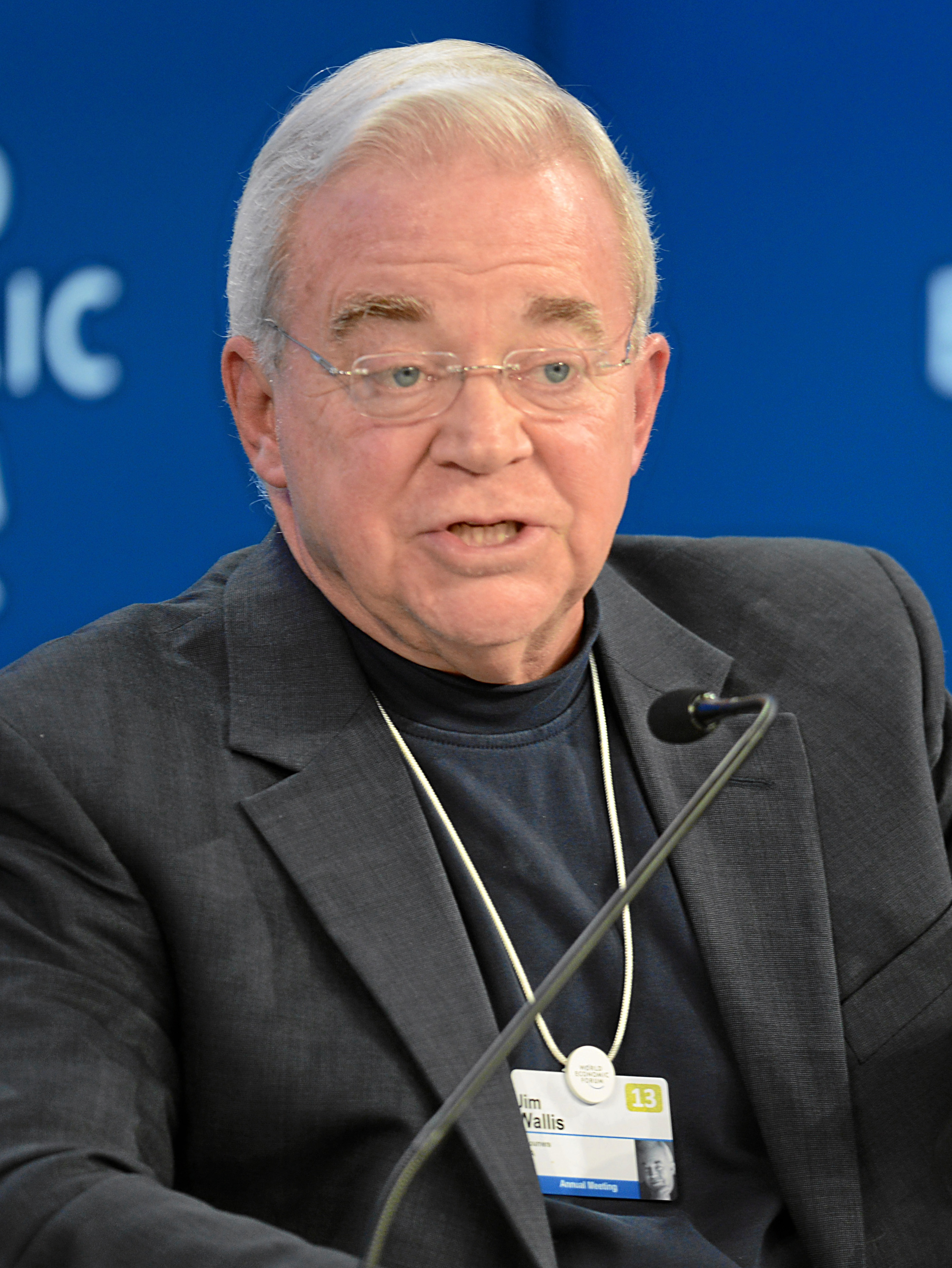
- Wallis at 2013 World Economic Forum Annual Meeting

Personal life
- Born: James E. Wallis Jr. June 4, 1948 (age 78) Detroit, Michigan, U.S.
- Spouse: Joy Carroll
- Education: Michigan State University; Trinity Evangelical Divinity School

Religious life
- Religion: Christianity

James E. Wallis Jr. (born June 4, 1948) is an American theologian, writer, teacher and political activist. He is best known as the founder and former editor of Sojourners magazine and as the founder of the Washington, D.C.–based Christian community of the same name. In 2021, Wallis joined Georgetown University as the inaugural Archbishop Desmond Tutu Chair in Faith and Justice. He also leads the Center on Faith and Justice at Georgetown. Wallis is known for his advocacy on issues of peace and social justice. Although Wallis actively eschews political labels, he describes himself as an evangelical and is often associated with the evangelical left and the wider Christian left. He worked as a spiritual advisor to President Barack Obama. He is also a leader in the Red-Letter Christian movement.

== Early life ==
James E. Wallis Jr. was born in Detroit, Michigan, the son of Phyllis (née Morrell) and James E. Wallis Sr. He was raised in a traditional Plymouth Brethren family. As a young man Wallis became active in Students for a Democratic Society and the civil rights movement. Wallis graduated from Michigan State University and attended Trinity Evangelical Divinity School in Illinois, where he joined with other young seminarians in establishing the community that eventually became Sojourners. The journal Sojourners originated in Deerfield, Illinois, as The Post American in 1971.

== Theology ==
Wallis wrote in 1974 that, "The new evangelical consciousness is most characterized by a return to biblical Christianity and the desire to apply biblical insights to the need for new forms of sociopolitical engagement."

A reviewer of Wallis's 1976 book Agenda for Biblical People summarized the Christological basis of Wallis's political theology:

Christ's life, death, and resurrection have brought victory over 'the powers.' He shattered the myth of their absolute authority by demonstrating his freedom in relation to them. He challenged their rule and would not submit to them. Indeed, the fallen powers were so exposed and threatened by Christ's actions that they acted in collusion to kill him. The cross symbolizes that freedom in which death is swallowed up in victory. Christ's resurrection vindicates his manner of life and death, seats his victory, and allows others to live freely and humanly in the midst of 'the powers' by their 'being in Christ.' This must be the proclamation and witness of the church of Jesus Christ. The church is a new force in history which is a sign to 'the powers' that their dominion has been broken. The very presence of a body of people who exercise their moral independence is an essential element for Wallis because 'without a visible and concrete demonstration of independence, all the church's outward attacks upon the institutions of the world will be doomed to failure.'

Writing in Sojourners in 1980, Wallis said, "Proclamation of the gospel, charismatic gifts, social action, and prophetic witness alone do not finally offer a real threat to the world as it is, especially when set apart from a community which incarnates a whole new order. It is the ongoing life of a community of faith that issues a basic challenge to the world as it is, and offers a viable and concrete alternative. The church must be called to be the church, to rebuild the kind of community that gives substance to the claims of faith."

== Political and social influence ==
Wallis was invited by Sen. Harry Reid (D-NV) to give the Democrats' weekly radio address on Saturday, December 2, 2006. He spoke about the importance of moral leadership in Washington and touched on a variety of social concerns. In February 2007, he wrote in Time about the post-Religious Right era and the resurgence of mainstream Christianity, with evangelicals "deserting the Religious Right in droves". Wallis has served on the Advisory Council to President Barack Obama's Office of Faith-Based and Neighborhood Partnerships. He served as a spiritual adviser to President Obama.

In addition to President Obama, Wallis has developed personal friendships with former British Prime Minister Gordon Brown and former Australian Prime Minister Kevin Rudd. In his 2010 book Rediscovering Values, Wallis writes, "I consider Rudd one of the most hopeful young political leaders in the world today, a committed Christian who seeks to apply his faith to his public service; we consider each other good friends."

In discussing the 2004 American presidential elections, Wallis said "Jesus didn't speak at all about homosexuality. There are about 12 verses in the Bible that touch on that question. Most of them are very contextual. There are thousands of verses on poverty. I don't hear a lot of that conversation."

Regarding same-sex marriage, Wallis made the following remarks in 2008: "I don't think the sacrament of marriage should be changed. Some people say that Jesus didn't talk about homosexuality, and that's technically true. But marriage is all through the Bible, and it's not gender-neutral. I have never done a blessing for a same-sex couple. I've never been asked to do one. I'm not sure that I would. I want churches that disagree on this to have a biblical, theological conversation and to live with their differences and not spend 90 percent of their denominational time arguing about this issue when 30,000 children are dying every single day because of poverty and disease". In a 2013 interview, Wallis changed his position and declared his support for same-sex marriage. He said: "Marriage needs some strengthening. Let's start with marriage, and then I think we have to talk about, now, how to include same-sex couples in that deeper understanding of marriage".

In a 2008 interview with Christianity Today, Wallis expressed strong support for abortion reduction, adding that "I don't think that abortion is the moral equivalent issue to slavery that Wilberforce dealt with. I think that poverty is the new slavery. Poverty and global inequality are the fundamental moral issues of our time. That's my judgment." A 2008 Newsweek article states that "Jim Wallis devoted a significant chunk of his latest book, 'The Great Awakening,' to outlining his views on abortion. The evangelical leader wrote in favor of 'protecting unborn life in every possible way, but without criminalizing abortion.'" Wallis added, "Everybody tends to agree that preventing unwanted pregnancies is a good thing. I'm saying, let's take it to the next step and say that abortion reduction is a good thing too. It's about providing options—not taking away a woman's right to choose, but making things like adoption easier."

In August 2009, Wallis signed a public statement encouraging all Christians to "read, wrestle with, and respond to Caritas in Veritate", the social encyclical by Pope Benedict XVI. A few months earlier, it was speculated that Wallis might have been chosen for the post of Vatican ambassador, but theologian Miguel H. Diaz was selected instead.

Wallis supported President Obama's health care legislation, and reportedly signed a letter urging that the legislation be passed even if it did not contain language explicitly banning federal funding for abortion.

In 2009, Wallis issued the following malediction upon Sarah Palin in the context of the healthcare reform debate in the United States:

Sarah, you're the one who is acting in an 'evil' way... You are speaking like a demagogue in the worst tradition of those who knowingly distort and deceive, for their own political purposes. You want to stoke people's worst fears and then, hopefully, they will look to someone like you to be their leader. You're not stupid after all. You know that neither President Obama, nor anyone else in this health-care debate, would deny health care for your parents or child, and that none of the ideas being debated would suggest that... Please don't invoke your 'Christian faith' anymore and embarrass the people of God even further. May your efforts to scare Americans during this important debate fail. May your political future also fail, and may your star fall as fast as it rose just a few months ago—because we now know who you really are.

In 2010, Wallis admitted to accepting money for Sojourners from philanthropist George Soros after initially denying having done so. When conservative writer Marvin Olasky pointed this out, and that Soros also financed groups supporting abortion, atheism, and same-sex marriage, in a World magazine column, Wallis said, "Glenn Beck lies for a living. I'm sad to see Marvin Olasky doing the same thing"; he subsequently apologized to Olasky for the comments. In 2011, Wallis acknowledged that Sojourners had received another $150,000 from Soros's Open Society Foundations.

Regarding the Occupy Wall Street movement, Wallis wrote, "The Occupiers' desire for change and willingness to take action to do something about it should be an inspiration to us all."

In 2017, Wallis criticized what he called the "cultural left" influence in the Democratic Party. He criticized Hillary Clinton and the Democratic Party for failing to embrace a "middle ground" approach to abortion. He stated that both Clinton and Donald Trump were "flawed choices" in the 2016 United States presidential election, but he also understood why many conservative Christians were unwilling to vote for Clinton due to her support for access to abortion. He also criticized Clinton's refusal to say that abortion should be "rare".

Wallis endorsed Democratic presidential nominee Kamala Harris in the 2024 presidential election.

=== Activism ===
As of March 2009, Wallis had been arrested 22 times for acts of civil disobedience. He was involved in antiwar activism during the Vietnam War, and wrote in 1974 that it was a "brutal, criminal war."

In spring of 2011, Wallis participated in a liquid-only fast in light of the congressional budget compromise. During the fast, Wallis said "The budget issue really energized and mobilized the faith community… It is our vocation as the people of God to protect the poorest and most vulnerable." Wallis is said to have coined the phrase “a budget is a moral document.” In December 2013, Jim Wallis penned an op-ed in Huffington Post discussing SEIU's Fast for Families. Faith leaders and young Dreamers alike completed the 22-day fast to “remind [political] leaders what is really at stake in the fight for immigration reform.”

In October 2014, Wallis was among the Christian, Jewish, and Muslim clergy arrested for disturbing the peace after a planned act of civil disobedience outside the police headquarters in Ferguson, Missouri, following the shooting death by police of Michael Brown. About his experience at Ferguson, Wallis said “It’s not just about admitting wrongdoing but also committing to making changes that prevent further harm from being done, and there has not even been any admitting of wrongdoing yet by any of the powers that be in Ferguson.”

== Writings and awards ==
Wallis is the author of multiple books, including The Great Awakening. Reviving Faith & Politics in a Post-Religious Right America (2008), God's Politics: Why the Right Gets It Wrong and the Left Doesn't Get It (2005), Faith Works: How Faith Based Organizations Are Changing Lives, Neighborhoods, and America (2000), The Soul of Politics: Beyond "Religious Right" and "Secular Left" (1995) and Call to Conversion (1981, revised 2005).

His 2015 book America's Original Sin, deals with systemic racism in the United States.

== Personal life ==
Wallis is married to Joy Carroll Wallis, who was one of the first female priests in the Church of England and upon whom the title character in the BBC sitcom The Vicar of Dibley was partially based. They have two sons. Jim Wallis has coached their Little League teams.

== Publications ==
- Agenda for Biblical People, Harper & Row (1976) ISBN 978-0-06-069236-0.
- The Call to Conversion, Harper & Row (1981) ISBN 978-0-06-069242-1, HarperCollins (Rev. ed., 2005) ISBN 978-0-06-084237-6.
- The New Radical, Lion Books (1983)
- Waging Peace: A Handbook for the Struggle to Abolish Nuclear Weapons (editor), Harper & Row (1982) ISBN 978-0-06-069240-7.
- The Soul of Politics: A practical and prophetic vision of change, Fount/HarperCollins (1994) ISBN 978-0-15-600328-5, Tandem Library ISBN 978-1-4177-0619-8.
- Who Speaks for God? A New Politics of Compassion, Community and Civility, Delacorte (1996) ISBN 978-0-385-31690-3, Random House (1997) ISBN 978-0-385-31693-4
- Faith Works: Lessons from the Life of an Activist Preacher, Random House (2000) ISBN 978-1-879290-23-5 (Rev. ed. with new subtitle: How to Live Your Beliefs and Ignite Positive Social Change, 2005)
- God's Politics: Why the Right Gets It Wrong and the Left Doesn't Get It HarperOne (2005) ISBN 978-0-06-055828-4.
- Living God's Politics: A Guide to Putting Your Faith into Action HarperOne (2006) ISBN 978-0-06-111841-8.
- The Great Awakening: Reviving Faith and Politics in a Post-Religious Right America HarperOne (2008) ISBN 978-0-06-055829-1.
- Rediscovering Values: On Main Street, Wall Street, and Your Street, Howard Books (2010) ISBN 978-1-4391-8312-0.
- On God's Side: What Religion Forgets and Politics Hasn't Learned (2013)
- America's Original Sin (2015)
- Christ in Crisis?: Why We Need to Reclaim Jesus (2019)

== See also ==
- Engaged Spirituality
- Evangelical left
- Progressive Christianity
- Social Gospel
