= Colts Catastrophe =

Unsuccessful trick play in American football

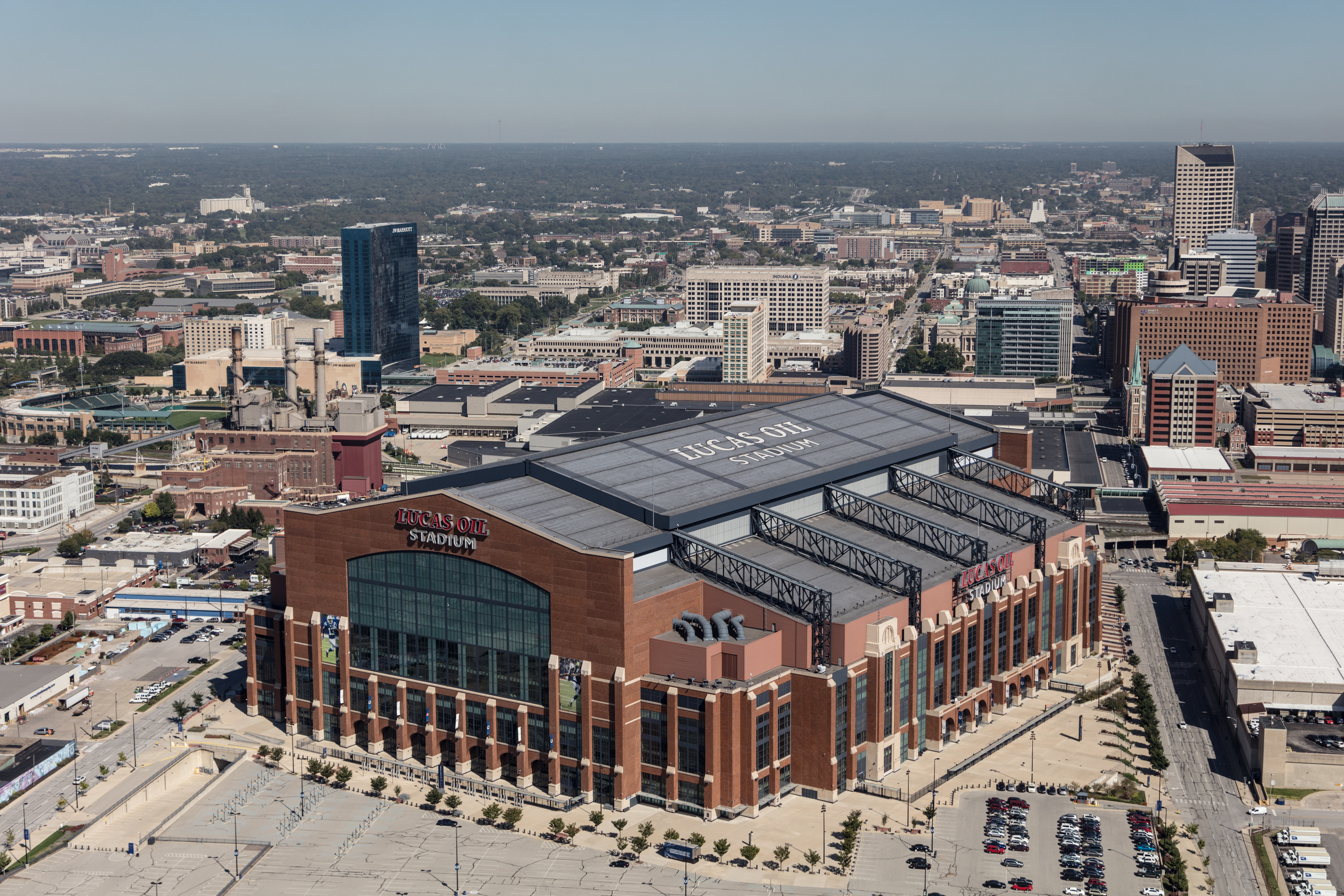
- Lucas Oil Stadium, the site of the game
New England Patriots (4–0)	Indianapolis Colts (3–2)
34	27
Head coach: Bill Belichick	Head coach: Chuck Pagano
	1	2	3	4	Total
NE	7	13	7	7	34
IND	7	14	0	6	27
- Date: October 18, 2015
- Stadium: Lucas Oil Stadium; Indianapolis, Indiana
- Favorite: Patriots by 9.5
- Referee: Tony Corrente
- Attendance: 66,726

TV in the United States
- Network: NBC
- Announcers: Al Michaels, Cris Collinsworth

The Colts Catastrophe was an unsuccessful National Football League (NFL) trick play attempted by the Indianapolis Colts against the New England Patriots on October 18, 2015. It occurred near the end of the third quarter in the teams' Week 6 game of the 2015 NFL season.

The play was called during a Colts' fourth down on their 37-yard line, with three yards needed for a new set of downs. A fake punt, it saw most of the Colts players (including punter Pat McAfee) move from their positions to line up on the other side of the field, leaving only upback Colt Anderson set to take the snap from gunner Griff Whalen. With the Colts' unusual formation alerting the Patriots to the fake punt before the play began and Anderson virtually unprotected by his teammates, Anderson was almost immediately tackled for a loss after the ball was snapped and New England took over on downs. An illegal formation penalty was also called on the Colts, which the Patriots declined. The Patriots scored a touchdown on the ensuing drive, helping seal their eventual 34–27 victory.

According to McAfee, the play was intended to trick the Patriots into being penalized for having too many men on the field or going offside, which would have resulted in a Colts first down. McAfee said Indianapolis planned on letting the play clock run out after it failed to draw a New England penalty, but a "communications breakdown" led to the ball being snapped. It is regarded as one of the worst trick plays in NFL history due to its poor execution and outcome.

== Background ==
The Colts and Patriots were perennial playoff contenders who had developed an intense rivalry over the years. The Patriots had most recently blown out the Colts in the 2014 AFC Championship Game (before subsequently winning Super Bowl XLIX), in a game marked by the Deflategate scandal. This Week 6 Sunday Night Football game was the first meeting between the two teams since the scandal.

The game featured a back-and-forth first half in which Patriots quarterback Tom Brady threw one touchdown pass and Colts quarterback Andrew Luck threw two. With strong running games and accurate kickers on each side, the Colts led the close contest by only a single point at halftime, 21–20. After Brady threw a touchdown pass to Rob Gronkowski on the Patriots' first drive of the third quarter, the teams traded punts for several possessions. When a Colts possession stalled at their own 37 yard line, the team chose to call for a trick play.

== The play ==
With 1:14 remaining in the third quarter, facing a fourth down with three yards to go on their own 37-yard line, the Colts lined up in a punt formation, with punter Pat McAfee in his usual position. After several moments, most of the Colts' punt team began jogging toward the Indianapolis sideline, but stopped and lined up in an imitation of their punt formation near the outer hash mark. Upback Colt Anderson jogged with them, then ran back toward the ball and lined up as quarterback behind gunner Griff Whalen, who had positioned himself as the new center and was prepared to snap the ball.

The Patriots players initially followed the Colts toward their sideline, but some remained in the area near the ball. Brandon Bolden and Jon Bostic positioned themselves on either side of Whalen in what would normally be called the A-gaps. Whalen snapped the ball with one second remaining on the play clock, and Bolden was immediately on top of Anderson, wrestling him to the ground with the assistance of Tarell Brown for a loss of two yards.

A penalty flag was thrown on the Colts, which referee Tony Corrente announced as an illegal formation penalty, explaining, "The whole right side of the line was not on the line of scrimmage." Patriots coach Bill Belichick declined the penalty, giving the Patriots the ball at the Indianapolis 35-yard line.

New England scored a touchdown on the ensuing drive and went on to win the game 34–27.

2015 Week Six: New England Patriots at Indianapolis Colts – Game summary

Quarter	1	2	3	4	Total
Patriots	7	13	7	7	34
Colts	7	14	0	6	27

at Lucas Oil Stadium, Indianapolis, Indiana

- Date: October 18, 2015
- Game time: 8:30 p.m. EDT/7:30 p.m. CDT
- Game weather: Played indoors (retractable roof closed)
- Game attendance: 66,726
- Referee: Tony Corrente
- TV announcers (NBC): Al Michaels, Cris Collinsworth and Michele Tafoya
- Boxscore, NFL.com Recap

Game information

First quarter

- IND – Donte Moncrief 5-yard pass from Luck (Adam Vinatieri kick)
- NE – Julian Edelman 12-yard pass from Brady (Stephen Gostkowski kick)

Second quarter

- NE – Gostkowski 40-yard FG
- IND – Mike Adams 14-yard interception return (Vinatieri kick)
- NE – Blount 38-yard run (Gostkowski kick)
- IND – Hilton 3-yard pass from Luck (Vinatieri kick)
- NE – Gostkowski 35-yard FG

Third quarter

- NE – Rob Gronkowski 25-yard pass from Brady (Gostkowski kick)

Fourth quarter

- NE – Blount 11-yard pass from Brady (Gostkowski kick)
- IND – Griff Whalen 18-yard pass from Luck (Vinatieri kick blocked)

Top passers

- NE – Tom Brady – 23/37, 312 YDS, 3 TD, INT
- IND – Andrew Luck – 30/50, 312 YDS, 3 TD

Top rushers

- NE – LeGarrette Blount – 16 CAR, 93 YDS, TD
- IND – Frank Gore – 13 CAR, 78 YDS

Top receivers

- NE – Danny Amendola – 7 REC, 105 YDS
- IND – T. Y. Hilton – 6 REC, 74 YDS, TD

== Reaction ==
Color commentator Cris Collinsworth cut himself off in mid-thought when the Colts began moving. He and play-by-play announcer Al Michaels reacted to the play with hesitation and confusion.

Collinsworth: Uh-oh.
Michaels: Yeah. Now we've got... on a 4th down and 3... you got Griff Whalen ready to take the snap. He'll snap it, actually Colt Anderson is behind him.
[At this point the ball is snapped.]
Collinsworth: What. The. Heck?
Michaels: And... w-what in the world. Flag is down. You tell me.
Collinsworth: I thought maybe they were trying to get them to jump offsides.

A nonplussed Collinsworth spent several moments trying to analyze the play, making statements such as, "That was insane," "I've never seen anything more bizarre than that," and "What was the plan?" to which Michaels replied "I don't know. It's completely nuts."

Scott Allen of The Washington Post compared the play to the Washington Redskins's swinging gate play in 2009.

== McAfee's explanations ==
On October 25, 2018, and later on October 18, 2019—the fourth anniversary of the play—punter McAfee provided a detailed explanation of the play on The Pat McAfee Show. According to McAfee, the play was designed to trick the Patriots into committing a penalty. The shift of the special teams players was intended to fool the Patriots into thinking the Colts were about to send the offense back onto the field; the hope was the Patriots would send their defense out on the field, allowing the Colts to catch them with too many men on the field. In this case, the resulting five-yard penalty would give the Colts enough yards for a first down. If that failed, the Colts would simply wait for the play clock to expire, take the five-yard delay of game penalty, and punt normally on the next play.

McAfee claimed that the play was executed flawlessly during practice, but Whalen was not involved in the practice drills. The player who had initially been assigned the role of snapper, McAfee said, was deactivated on Saturday due to illness, leaving Whalen only a day or so to learn the play. As a result, Whalen read in the playbook that he should snap the ball if the quarterback for the play gets under center. Pagano had apparently told Anderson before the play that he was to use a hard count to try to draw them offside should they fail to catch the defense with too many men on the field. This would also give a first down if successful and was still intended to lead to a delay of game if the Patriots did not commit either penalty. Whalen was unaware of this last-minute change to the play; McAfee noted that even the other players on the field were not expecting Anderson's hard count. Per McAfee, Whalen was not intended to snap the ball at all during the play. Similarly, Pagano attributed a "communications breakdown" for the play's failure.

== Legacy ==
The Colts finished the year 8–8, one game behind the AFC South champion Houston Texans, beginning a three-year playoff drought. Coach Chuck Pagano was fired in 2017 after two subsequent non-winning seasons.

Football fans on Twitter reacted with strong statements of contempt directed toward the Colts. Internet memes that spread in the immediate aftermath featured Luck, Pagano, and other Colts figures cast as the Three Stooges, along with Hillary Clinton and other political characters.

On the NFL Network's "Top 10 Worst Plays" episode, the Colts Catastrophe was ranked number six.

The Colts Catastrophe was referenced in the SB Nation video "The Worst Trick Play", which deemed the swinging gate play attempted by the Washington Redskins against the New York Giants to be worse. Commentator Will Buikema noted the Colts were seeking to draw a penalty instead of attempting a fake punt, while the Redskins intended to run their play, even after the Giants called a timeout that effectively prevented the Redskins from catching them off-guard.

== See also ==
- Colts–Patriots rivalry
- Deflategate
- List of nicknamed NFL games and plays
