= Colts–Patriots rivalry =

National Football League rivalry

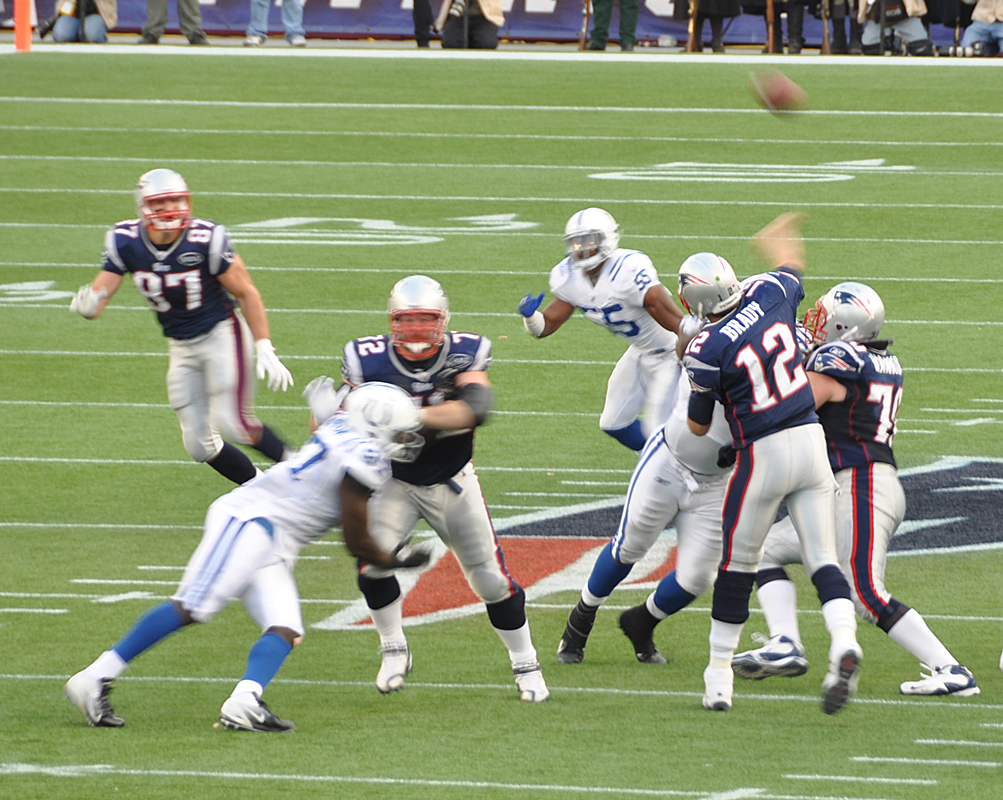
- Patriots' quarterback Tom Brady throwing a pass in a 2011 game against the Colts

- Indianapolis Colts New England Patriots
- Location: Indianapolis, Boston
- First meeting: October 4, 1970; Colts 14, Patriots 6
- Latest meeting: December 1, 2024; Colts 25, Patriots 24
- Next meeting: 2027
- Stadiums: Colts: Lucas Oil Stadium; Patriots: Gillette Stadium

Statistics
- Total meetings: 85
- All-time series: Patriots: 53–32
- Regular season series: Patriots: 49–31
- Postseason results: Patriots: 4–1
- Largest victory: Colts: 31–0 (1972); Patriots: 42–3 (1974)
- Most points scored: Colts: 40 (2005); Patriots: 59 (2012)
- Longest win streak: Colts: 3 (1970–1971, 2005–2006); Patriots: 8 (2010–2018)
- Current win streak: Colts: 2 (2023–present)

Post-season history
- 2003 AFC Championship: Patriots won: 24–14; 2004 AFC Divisional: Patriots won: 20–3; 2006 AFC Championship: Colts won: 38–34; 2013 AFC Divisional: Patriots won: 43–22; 2014 AFC Championship: Patriots won: 45–7

The Colts–Patriots rivalry is a National Football League (NFL) rivalry between the Indianapolis Colts and New England Patriots.

As the Colts play in the AFC South and the Patriots are in the AFC East, the two teams do not play every year; instead, they play at least once every three years and at least once every six seasons at each team's home stadium due to the NFL's rotating division schedules during which their divisions are paired up, sometimes more often if the two teams finish in the same place in their respective divisions or meet in the playoffs.

It is considered one of the most famous rivalries in the NFL from the 2000s due to the teams posting numerous winning seasons during the decades as well as it being the height of the rivalry between Tom Brady and Peyton Manning, even though the rivalry began in 1970 when the AFL and NFL merged. While the Patriots were the unquestioned lords of the NFL during the 2000s, the Colts were one of the few teams that could reasonably challenge the Patriots, especially with their higher winning percentage and 2006 season Super Bowl victory. The two teams have combined for seven Super Bowl victories (six by the Patriots) and eleven AFC Championships (nine by the Patriots) since 2001. The Colts and Patriots were AFC East division rivals from 1970 to 2001 (dating prior to the Colts' move from Baltimore to Indianapolis), but their intensified enmity was not prevalent until Indianapolis was moved into the newly formed AFC South following the 2001 season as part of the NFL's realignment. The Patriots hold a lead in points scored, 2,112 to 1,602 for the Colts. In 2020, CBS ranked this rivalry as the No. 1 NFL rivalry of the 2000s.

The modern matchup spanning the period of 2001–2011 was usually headlined as a contest between quarterbacks Peyton Manning and Tom Brady, who together won six NFL MVP awards in eight years (2003–10; four by Manning). In September 2001 Brady received his first start against the Colts after an injury to then-starter Drew Bledsoe, and proceeded to defeat the Colts in his first six games against them in the next years, including the 2003 AFC Championship Game and a 2004 AFC Divisional playoff game. The 2004 Divisional game was notable as the Patriots held a record holding Colts offense to 3 points on snowy cold night in Foxborough. The Colts won the next three matches, notching two regular season victories and a win in the 2006 AFC Championship Game on the way to their win in Super Bowl XLI. Since then, the Patriots have won ten out of the next fourteen games from 2007 to 2023. The quarterback angle of the rivalry changed in 2012 following Manning's release from the team, and with the surge to success of Colts rookie Andrew Luck. The rivalry gained momentum again in February 2018, when Patriots offensive coordinator Josh McDaniels, who had agreed to become the head coach of the Colts, went back on his word and decided to stay on as a coordinator in New England. The Patriots beat the Colts every single game in the 2010s, going 8–0 (including 2–0 in the postseason in 2013 & 2014). The streak ended in 2021 in a 27–17 Colts victory.

The Patriots lead the overall series, 53–32. The two teams have met five times in the playoffs, with the Patriots holding a 4–1 advantage.

== Notable games ==
- August 13, 1967 (preseason):

The 1967 football season for both the NFL and the American Football League opened with the agreement for the pending merger of the two leagues already in place. On August 13, 1967, the Boston Patriots hosted the Baltimore Colts at Harvard Stadium. The Colts won 33–3.

- October 4, 1970:

The Patriots and Colts met for the first time in NFL regular-season play at Harvard Stadium in week three of the 1970 season. The Colts jumped to a 7–0 lead in the first quarter, but the Patriots closed to a 7–6 fourth-quarter score on two Gino Cappelletti field goals. On following series, Johnny Unitas, who relieved starter Earl Morrall, finished off the Patriots with a 55-yard touchdown pass and a 14–6 Colts win.

- November 14, 1976:

Battling the Colts for the AFC East title, the Patriots traveled to Baltimore with a 6–3 record (including a 27–13 Colts victory in Foxborough in week one of the season). The Patriots picked off Bert Jones twice, leading to a 21–14 win. The win accelerated a six-game winning streak for the Patriots and their first playoff berth since 1963.

- September 18, 1978:

The Colts had been AFC East champs the previous three seasons, but were minus many of their best players due to trades and injuries, including Bert Jones and starting cornerbacks Nelson Munsey and Norm Thompson. They were 0–2 and 18-point underdogs when they traveled to Foxboro to play the Patriots on Monday Night Football. It was a sloppy game for three quarters, with New England leading 13-7 heading into the final period. As it started raining hard, Baltimore came to life behind running back Joe Washington, making his first start with the team after an off-season trade from San Diego. First he threw a 54-yard touchdown pass on a halfback option to Roger Carr. Later he caught a 23-yard touchdown pass from Bill Troup. After Troup and Carr connected for a 67-yard score, the Colts led 27–13 with eight minutes to play. The Patriots came back to score twice on runs by Steve Grogan and Sam Cunningham sandwiched around a successful onside kick to tie the game with 1:32 left. But Washington fielded the bouncing ensuing kickoff and darted 90 yards across the shimmering rain-soaked field for the touchdown to give Baltimore the stunning 34–27 win, causing Howard Cosell to exclaim, "What a football game this turned out to be!"

- October 9, 1983:

The Patriots lost to the Baltimore Colts 12–7 in Baltimore; it turned out to be the final meeting between the Patriots and the Baltimore Colts, as the team moved to Indianapolis in 1984. It was also New England's last game in Baltimore until the Baltimore Ravens debuted in 1996.

- November 18, 1984:

In their first meeting at Indianapolis, the Patriots made their first trip to the Hoosier Dome and defeated the Colts 50–17. The win was the second for new coach Raymond Berry, a former Colts receiver.

- November 15, 1992:

The 4–5 Colts hosted the 0–9 Patriots and the two teams lit up the Hoosier Dome scoreboard in an overtime thriller. The game lead tied or changed 10 times and the Patriots scored twice off Jeff George interceptions. Patriots kicker Charlie Baumann accounted for the Patriots' final nine points of a 37–34 overtime triumph that came amid illness to coach Dick McPherson.

- September 19, 1999:

Peyton Manning made his second career trip to Foxborough and led the Colts to a 28–7 halftime lead. The Patriots, behind Drew Bledsoe, scored 17 unanswered points in the fourth off Colt turnovers and the game-winning Adam Vinatieri field goal came in the final thirty seconds.

- December 12, 1999:

The Colts hosted the Patriots, holding a 10–2 record to New England's 7–5. The Colts earned a 20–15 win despite 344 passing yards from Drew Bledsoe. It was the first for Manning over New England after three straight losses and the first win over the Patriots for the Manning family (Peyton's dad Archie was 0–3 lifetime against the Patriots with the New Orleans Saints and Houston Oilers.)

- September 30, 2001:

Week three of the 2001 season, Tom Brady made his first NFL start when the 2–0 Colts came to Foxborough. The Colts were defeated 44–13 as Peyton Manning threw three interceptions, two returned for touchdowns. On October 21, New England traveled to the RCA Dome and won 38–17, where Patriot David Patten became the first player since Walter Payton in 1979 to score touchdowns three separate ways: throwing a 60-yard pass to Troy Brown, a 91-yard reception from Brady, and a rushing score.

- November 30, 2003:

The first meeting since divisional realignment put the Colts into the now-second year AFC South, the two clubs sported 9–2 records, the latest into a season two teams with such records had met. The Patriots erupted to a 31–10 lead in the third quarter. Peyton Manning rallied the Colts back, throwing three touchdowns to tie the game, however the Patriots clawed back to a 38–34 lead. The Colts drove to the Patriots' 2-yard line in the final minute, only to be stopped on four downs.

- November 7, 2005:

Heading into the Monday Night fight between the Colts (7–0) and the two-time defending Super Bowl champion Patriots (4–3), QB Peyton Manning was winless against New England in Foxborough (0–7). The Colts beat the Patriots, 40–21. In the game's closing minutes, veteran QB Doug Flutie replaced Brady, and Colts president Bill Polian was heard in the press box yelling "break his leg!"

- 2006 AFC Championship Game:

The Colts and Patriots met in their first AFC Championship game since 2003, a game in which New England won en route to their third Super Bowl Championship in four years. The Patriots and Colts were both unable to earn a first-round bye at the end of the 2006 season, the first time in the series history that they had met in the playoffs after both played in the Wild Card round. New England was coming off of wins over the Jets and Chargers, and finished the 2006 season with a 12–4 record. The Colts were also 12–4, but finished ahead of the Patriots by virtue of their head-to-head win over them during the regular season in Foxborough. The Colts were coming off wins over the Chiefs and Ravens. In this game, the Patriots ran out to a 21–3 lead in the second quarter, but the Colts would pull off a fierce comeback to win 38–34, the largest comeback win in conference championship history at the time. With 1 minute remaining in the game, Joseph Addai rushed in for a touchdown from 3 yards out to give the Colts the lead. The game was sealed with an interception by Marlin Jackson with 14 seconds remaining, sending the Colts to the Super Bowl, which they won 29–17 over the Chicago Bears. The 15-point comeback in the second half by Indianapolis was the largest in conference championship history until it was broken 8 years later in the 2014 NFC Championship game, in which the Seahawks came back from 16 points down to beat the Packers 28–22 in overtime.

- November 4, 2007:

The 8–0 Patriots faced the 7–0 Colts in the RCA Dome, the latest in a season that two undefeated teams had ever faced off. The Patriots had scored over 34 points in every game but the Colts defense stifled the Patriots' attack and Indianapolis clawed to a 20–10 lead in the fourth. But a 58-yard Tom Brady bomb to Randy Moss was caught at the Colts' 3-yard line, leading to a Wes Welker touchdown catch. After stopping Manning and forcing a punt, a strong kick return by Welker set up a three-play touchdown drive highlighted by a 32-yard catch by Donté Stallworth and a Kevin Faulk touchdown catch. Manning was hit and threw the ball into the hands of Rosevelt Colvin on the next Colts drive and the Patriots ran out the remaining clock for the 24–20 win. This win was number nine in the Patriots' 16–0 regular season.

- November 15, 2009 (4th and 2 Game):

The undefeated Indianapolis Colts again played the 6-2 New England Patriots in what was Tom Brady's first start at Lucas Oil Stadium. With 4:12 left in the fourth quarter, the Patriots had pulled away 34–21. A pass interference call against New England set up a four-yard touchdown run by Colts RB Joseph Addai with 2:23 left. Leading 34–28, but backed up on their own 28-yard-line and needing to reach the 30-yard-line for a first down, Patriots coach Bill Belichick elected to go for it on 4th and 2 instead of punting. Brady completed a pass to halfback Kevin Faulk, but Faulk appeared not to make a clean catch and was immediately driven backwards. Officials determined that Faulk had not secured possession of the ball until he was short of the first down marker, resulting in a turnover on downs, and giving Manning and the Colts the ball on the Patriots' own 29-yard line with two minutes remaining. After three plays, Manning completed a one-yard touchdown pass to Reggie Wayne, making the score even at 34–34 with 13 seconds left. Kicker Matt Stover, filling in for Adam Vinatieri, made the extra point to make the score 35-34 and secured the victory for Indianapolis.

Belichick obliquely criticized the ball-spot on the play in his Monday morning press conference. Nevertheless, his decision was highly criticized by the media. Jarrett Bell of USA Today claimed the coach had "outsmarted himself," while Bill Simmons, ESPN.com writer and Patriots fan, asked "What the fuck was Belichick thinking" and compared the entire ordeal to "riding in the passenger seat of a friend's car and watching helplessly as he plows over a pedestrian".

- November 21, 2010:

The 6-3 Colts traveled to New England for the first time since 2006 and New England won its first home game against Indianapolis since a playoff game in 2004. Manning and his Colts were down by 17 in the 4th quarter and came back to reduce the New England lead to 31–28 with a few minutes left. Manning led the drive down the field, but a terrible play call would occur, as had happened in the previous year's matchup. With the Colts already in great field goal range (24-yard line of New England), Manning was intercepted by James Sanders with 32 seconds left; it was Manning's third pick of the game and the 31-28 New England win put the Patriots to 8-2 while the Colts fell to second in the AFC South with a 6–4 record. The game turned out to be the last game ever between the Patriots and Manning as a member of the Colts; he would miss the 2011 season due to neck surgery and was released; he then signed with the Denver Broncos and faced the Patriots in his first season there.

- 2013 AFC Divisional Playoffs:

Because the division-rival Texans won the AFC South with the Patriots winning the AFC East, there was no regular season meeting in 2013 between both teams for the first time since 2002, the first year of the NFL's current division alignment. Both teams won division titles in 2013 and with a stunning comeback win over Kansas City combined with San Diego's playoff win over Cincinnati, the Colts met the Patriots in the AFC Divisional round on January 11, 2014. The Patriots and Colts played a tight game until the Patriots scored 21 unanswered points in the fourth quarter to win 43–22. LeGarrette Blount erupted to 166 rushing yards and four touchdowns while Tom Brady reached 6,000 postseason passing yards with 198. Andrew Luck threw for 331 yards and two touchdowns but was intercepted four times for the second consecutive game, twice by Alfonzo Dennard. The Patriots would go on to lose the AFC Championship Game 26–16 against Peyton Manning and the Denver Broncos.

- 2014 AFC Championship Game:

The Patriots defeated the Colts 45–7 in the AFC Championship Game at Gillette Stadium on January 18, 2015, following Indianapolis playoff wins over Cincinnati and Denver and New England's divisional round win over Baltimore. With the victory the Patriots moved on to defeat the Seattle Seahawks in Super Bowl XLIX to win their fourth championship. New England's victory has been controversial, as the Patriots were alleged to have deliberately or negligently underinflated footballs used in the game, which has been dubbed "Deflategate". The controversy was addressed by Bill Belichick in a snap press conference a week before Super Bowl XLIX and took a bizarre turn when Adam Schefter reported a league employee was fired after this game for stealing footballs and illegally selling them.

- October 18, 2015 - Colts Catastrophe:

With 1:14 remaining in the third quarter on their own 37-yard line, leading 21–20, the Colts lined up with Pat McAfee to punt. Then most of the Colts jogged toward the Indianapolis sideline, before stopping in punt formation near the outer hash mark. Colt Anderson jogged with them, then ran back toward the ball and lined up as quarterback behind Griff Whalen to receive the snap. Most of the Patriots players followed the Colts toward their sideline, but Brandon Bolden and Jon Bostic stayed on either side of Whalen, who snapped the ball with one second remaining on the play clock, and Bolden was immediately on top of Anderson, wrestling him to the ground with the assistance of Tarell Brown for a loss of two yards. A penalty flag was thrown on the Colts and referee Tony Corrente announced, "The whole right side of the line was not on the line of scrimmage." Patriots coach Bill Belichick declined the penalty, giving the Patriots the ball at the Indianapolis 35-yard line. New England scored on a Tom Brady pass to Rob Gronkowski and went on to win 34–27.

- December 18, 2021:

The 9–4 Patriots traveled to Indianapolis to take on the 7–6 Colts in the first meeting between the two franchises in the post-Tom Brady era. With former Colts franchise QB Andrew Luck now retired as well, this was the first meeting since 1997 to not feature Brady, Luck, or Peyton Manning. With both teams starting new QBs in Carson Wentz for the Colts and Mac Jones for the Patriots, Indianapolis stormed out to a 17–0 halftime lead behind stout defensive play and a blocked punt returned for a touchdown by the Colts' E. J. Speed. However, aided by a Colts missed field goal and crucial interception by Wentz in the second half, Jones and the Patriots stormed back to make it a 20–17 game before Colts' running back Jonathan Taylor sealed the game for good with a 67-yard touchdown run in the final three minutes of the game and the Colts would win 27–17. Taylor, who came into the game leading the league in rushing, finished with 29 carries for 170 yards and his 17th rushing touchdown of the year, which gave him the Colts' single-season franchise record for rushing touchdowns. Jones would complete 26 of 45 pass attempts for 299 yards and two touchdowns, but also had two interceptions. Wentz, meanwhile, completed only 5 of 12 pass attempts for 57 yards, one touchdown, and an interception. This was the Colts' first win over the Patriots since 2009, after going 0–8 against New England in the 2010s.

== Season-by-season results ==
Baltimore/Indianapolis Colts vs. New England Patriots Season-by-Season Results
1970s (Colts, 11–9)

Season	Season series	at Baltimore Colts	at Boston/New England Patriots	Overall series	Notes
1970	Colts 2–0	Colts; 27–3	Colts; 14–6	Colts; 2–0	AFL–NFL merger. Both teams were placed in the AFC East. The Colts win Super Bowl V. The week four game is the lone meeting at Harvard Stadium.
1971	Tie 1–1	Patriots; 21–17	Colts; 23–3	Colts; 3–1	The Patriots changed the name to "New England Patriots," opening Foxboro Stadium (then known as Schaefer Stadium). New England scores the game-winning touchdown in the season finale at Baltimore on an 88-yard pass from Jim Plunkett to Randy Vataha, costing the Colts the AFC East championship.
1972	Colts 2–0	Colts; 31–0	Colts; 24–17	Colts; 5–1	Game at Foxborough is Patriots' first appearance on Monday Night Football.
1973	Tie 1–1	Colts; 18–13	Patriots; 24–16	Colts; 6–2	
1974	Patriots 2–0	Patriots; 27–17	Patriots; 42–3	Colts; 6–4	
1975	Tie 1–1	Colts; 34–21	Patriots; 21–10	Colts; 7–5	
1976	Tie 1–1	Patriots; 21–14	Colts; 27–13	Colts; 8–6	Both teams finished with 11–3 records, but the Colts clinched the AFC East based on a better division record.
1977	Tie 1–1	Colts; 30–24	Patriots; 17–3	Colts; 9–7	In Baltimore, Colts overcame a 21–3 second-half deficit and won the AFC East championship with their win.
1978	Tie 1–1	Patriots; 35–14	Colts; 34–27	Colts; 10–8	Joe Washington puts on a spectacular performance in a driving rainstorm at Foxboro on Monday Night Football in week three.
1979	Tie 1–1	Colts; 31–26	Patriots; 50–21	Colts; 11–9	

1980s (Patriots, 13–6)

Season	Season series	at Baltimore/Indianapolis Colts	at New England Patriots	Overall series	Notes
1980	Patriots 2–0	Patriots; 37–21	Patriots; 47–21	Tie; 11–11	
1981	Colts 2–0	Colts; 23–21	Colts; 29–28	Colts; 13–11	In Indianapolis, Colts' win snapped their 14-game losing streak. Their two victories over the Patriots were the only wins of their 1981 season, coming in the first and last games of the season.
1982	Patriots 1–0	Patriots; 24–13	Canceled	Colts; 13–12	Debut for coaches Ron Meyer (Patriots) and Frank Kush (Colts). The game in Foxboro was canceled due to Players strike, reducing the season to 9 games.
1983	Colts 2–0	Colts; 12–7	Colts; 29–23 (OT)	Colts; 15–12	The game in Foxboro is the first overtime meeting in the series, with Colts LB Johnie Cooks scoring the game-winning touchdown on a fumble return. The game in Baltimore is the last meeting in the series there. Baltimore ends its series 15-12.
1984	Patriots 2–0	Patriots; 50–17	Patriots; 16–10	Colts; 15–14	The first games of the series were between Indianapolis and New England. Indianapolis game opens the RCA Dome (previously known as the Hoosier Dome).
1985	Patriots 2–0	Patriots; 38–31	Patriots; 34–15	Patriots; 16–15	The Patriots take the first lead in the series. Patriots lose Super Bowl XX.
1986	Patriots 2–0	Patriots; 30–21	Patriots; 33–3	Patriots; 18–15	Former Patriots coach Ron Meyer was named Colts coach after Indianapolis lost its first 13 games.
1987	Tie 1–1	Colts; 30–16	Patriots; 24–0	Patriots; 19–16	
1988	Tie 1–1	Colts; 24–21	Patriots; 21–17	Patriots; 20–17	
1989	Patriots 2–0	Patriots; 23–20 (OT)	Patriots; 22–16	Patriots; 22–17	

1990s (Patriots, 14–6)

Season	Season series	at Indianapolis Colts	at New England Patriots	Overall series	Notes
1990	Tie 1–1	Patriots; 16–14	Colts; 13–10	Patriots; 23–18	Patriots' win was their only win in the 1990 season, as they went on a 14-game losing streak to finish the season.
1991	Patriots 2–0	Patriots; 16–7	Patriots; 23–17 (OT)	Patriots; 25–18	Patriots' win in Indianapolis ended their 14-game losing streak. In New England, Patriots overcame a 17–3 fourth-quarter deficit. One season after the Patriots finished 1–15, the Colts matched the humiliating feat by finishing 1–15 this season.
1992	Tie 1–1	Patriots; 37–34 (OT)	Colts; 6–0	Patriots; 26–19	Patriots' get their first win of the season after an 0–9 start. it would also be their only road win that season.
1993	Tie 1–1	Colts; 9–6	Patriots; 38–0	Patriots; 27–20	Game in Foxboro is Patriots' QB Drew Bledsoe's first start in the series.
1994	Patriots 2–0	Patriots; 12–10	Patriots; 28–13	Patriots; 29–20	
1995	Colts 2–0	Colts; 10–7	Colts; 24–10	Patriots; 29–22	The Colts' first season sweep since 1983. Only a regular season sweep for the Colts-based Indianapolis as AFC East rivals. Indianapolis clinches a playoff berth with a home victory in the regular-season finale.
1996	Patriots 2–0	Patriots; 27–9	Patriots; 27–13	Patriots; 31–22	Patriots lose Super Bowl XXXI. Bill Parcells leaves the Patriots after four seasons to coach the Jets.
1997	Patriots 2–0	Patriots; 31–6	Patriots; 20–17	Patriots; 33–22	
1998	Patriots 2–0	Patriots; 21–16	Patriots; 29–6	Patriots; 35–22	Peyton Manning makes the first start of the series for the Colts.
1999	Tie 1–1	Colts; 20–15	Patriots; 31–28	Patriots; 36–23	In New England, Patriots overcame a 28–7 second-half deficit.

2000s (Patriots, 8–6)

Season	Results	Location	Overall series	Notes
2000	Patriots; 24–16	Foxboro Stadium	Patriots; 37–24	Bill Belichick's first meeting vs. Colts as Patriots coach.
2000	Colts; 30–23	RCA Dome	Patriots; 37–24	Last start in the series for Drew Bledsoe.
2001	Patriots; 44–13	Foxboro Stadium	Patriots; 39–24	Tom Brady's first start in the series. Tom Brady–Peyton Manning rivalry begins. The last meeting in the series as division rivals was at Foxboro Stadium.
2001	Patriots; 38–17	RCA Dome	Patriots; 39–24	Last meeting as AFC East rivals. Patriots win Super Bowl XXXVI.
2003	Patriots; 38-34	RCA Dome	Patriots; 40–24	
2003 playoffs	Patriots; 24–14	Gillette Stadium	Patriots; 41–24	AFC Championship Game. It's the first postseason meeting and the first meeting at Gillette Stadium in the series. Peyton Manning gets intercepted four times. Patriots go on to win Super Bowl XXXVIII.
2004	Patriots; 27–24	Gillette Stadium	Patriots; 42–24	NFL Kickoff Game.
2004 playoffs	Patriots; 20–3	Gillette Stadium	Patriots; 43–24	AFC Divisional playoffs. Patriots go on to win Super Bowl XXXIX.
2005	Colts; 40–21	Gillette Stadium	Patriots; 43–25	
2006	Colts; 27–20	Gillette Stadium	Patriots; 43–26	
2006 playoffs	Colts; 38–34	RCA Dome	Patriots; 43–27	AFC Championship Game. Colts overcome a 21–3 deficit. Colts go on to win Super Bowl XLI.
2007	Patriots; 24–20	RCA Dome	Patriots; 44–27	Game was dubbed "Super Bowl XLI½" with the Patriots entering at 8–0 and the Colts at 7–0. Patriots’ win handed the Colts their first loss of the season and ended their 13-game home winning streak. Last matchup played at RCA Dome. Patriots lose Super Bowl XLII.
2008	Colts; 18–15	Lucas Oil Stadium	Patriots; 44–28	First meeting at Lucas Oil Stadium. The only time from 2001–2018 that Brady didn't start for the Patriots.
2009	Colts; 35–34	Lucas Oil Stadium	Patriots; 44–29	Colts overcame a 31–14 fourth-quarter deficit. Colts lose Super Bowl XLIV.

2010s (Patriots, 8–0)

Season	Results	Location	Overall series	Notes
2010	Patriots; 31–28	Gillette Stadium	Patriots; 45–29	This is the last meeting for Peyton Manning as a Colt.
2011	Patriots; 31–24	Gillette Stadium	Patriots; 46–29	Patriots lose Super Bowl XLVI at Colts' Lucas Oil Stadium. The Colts finished with the NFL's worst record (2–14) due to Manning missing the entire season following neck surgery.
2012	Patriots; 59–24	Gillette Stadium	Patriots; 47–29	First start for Andrew Luck in the series.
2013 playoffs	Patriots; 43–22	Gillette Stadium	Patriots; 48–29	AFC Divisional playoffs.
2014	Patriots; 42–20	Lucas Oil Stadium	Patriots; 49–29	
2014 playoffs	Patriots; 45–7	Gillette Stadium	Patriots; 50–29	AFC Championship Game. "Deflategate" controversy. Patriots go on to win Super Bowl XLIX.
2015	Patriots; 34–27	Lucas Oil Stadium	Patriots; 51–29	This game is best remembered for the Colts' ill-fated fake punt attempt (later known as the "Colts Catastrophe") late in the third quarter.
2018	Patriots; 38–24	Gillette Stadium	Patriots; 52–29	It's the last start for both Andrew Luck and Tom Brady in the series. Patriots win Super Bowl LIII.

2020s (Colts, 3–1)

Season	Results	Location	Overall series	Notes
2021	Colts; 27–17	Lucas Oil Stadium	Patriots; 52–30	First start for Mac Jones in the series. Jonathan Taylor sets Colts single-season franchise record for most rushing touchdowns during the game. The first victory for the Colts in the rivalry since 2009.
2022	Patriots; 26–3	Gillette Stadium	Patriots; 53–30	Colts fired head coach Frank Reich following this game.
2023	Colts; 10–6	Deutsche Bank Park	Patriots; 53–31	Game in Frankfurt, Germany as part of NFL International Series, officially a Patriots home game.
2024	Colts; 25–24	Gillette Stadium	Patriots; 53–32	Colts' first win at Gillette Stadium since the 2006 season.

Summary of results

Season	Season series	at Baltimore/Indianapolis Colts	at Boston/New England Patriots	Notes
Regular season	Patriots 49–31	Patriots 22–17	Patriots 27–14	The Colts went 8–6 in games played in Baltimore and 1–0 in Frankfurt, which was officially a Patriots home game.
Postseason	Patriots 4–1	Colts 1–0	Patriots 4–0	AFC Divisional: 2004, 2013; AFC Championship: 2003, 2006, 2014
Regular and postseason	Patriots 53–31	Patriots 22–18	Patriots 31–14	

== Connections between the teams ==
- Upton Bell was personnel director of the Colts in their first two Super Bowl appearances (III and V) and in 1971 took over as GM of the Patriots on the recommendation of Colts team owner Carroll Rosenbloom. Bell clashed with coach John Mazur because Mazur objected to Bell's policy of picking up waiver-wire free agents for him to train during the season. Eventually the two all but stopped speaking (the corridor between their two offices at Schaefer Stadium became known as "the DMZ") and Bell wanted to fire Mazur; the Patriots' board of directors agreed to the move provided the Patriots lost to the Colts by more than seven points in the 1971 season finale. Bell expected the Colts to win, since he knew the Colts team having helped build it, but instead of losing, Jim Plunkett's 88-yard touchdown pass caught by Randy Vataha made for a 21-17 Patriots win. Bell was heard furiously screaming for Vataha not to score, for the win guaranteed Mazur would continue as coach for 1972. Mazur and Bell were both released in the 1972 season.
- Ron Meyer coached the Patriots from 1982 until mid-October 1984. He became coach of the Colts in December 1986 until October 1991, leading the team to a 36–35 record and one playoff appearance, in the 1987 AFC Divisional Playoffs where the Colts lost 38–21 to the Cleveland Browns. Meyer was fired after the Colts lost their first five games of 1991. His record against the Patriots in nine games was 3–6.
- Before leading the Patriots to nine Super Bowl appearances and six Super Bowl wins as head coach, Bill Belichick's first job in the National Football League was as an assistant with the Baltimore Colts in 1975 under head coach Ted Marchibroda. In 1996, Belichick, then the head coach of the Cleveland Browns, returned to Baltimore following the Browns relocation but was fired shortly after the move. He was replaced by Marchibroda, who had just completed a four-season stint with the Indianapolis Colts. Belichick then took his first job with the Patriots, becoming an assistant under head coach Bill Parcells for the 1996 season.
- Kicker Adam Vinatieri made the iconic winning field goal against the St. Louis Rams in Super Bowl XXXVI with the Patriots and also played with them in three other Super Bowls (XXXI, XXXVIII, and XXXIX), winning three in total out of four. After the 2005 season, the Patriots chose not to place the franchise tag on Vinatieri as they had the year before, allowing him to become a free agent. He joined the Colts in 2006 and won the subsequent Super Bowl with them to earn his fourth ring. He was injured during the 2009 season, and did not play in Super Bowl XLIV, which the Colts lost 31–17 to the New Orleans Saints.
- Raymond Berry was one of the most famous receivers in Colts history when they played in Baltimore. He joined the Patriots coaching staff under Chuck Fairbanks and became head coach in 1984; among his first wins was a 50–17 triumph versus the Colts in New England's first ever trip to Indianapolis. Berry went 10–2 against the Colts as Patriots head coach, including season sweeps in 1984-86 and 1989.
- Jim E. Mora worked for the Patriots in 1982 under head coach Ron Meyer and became Colts head coach from 1998 to 2001; his record against the Patriots was 2–6.
- In 2009, the Colts finished the regular season 14–2 with the best record in the NFL, and an AP MVP award for starting quarterback Peyton Manning, while the Patriots finished the season 10-6 receiving the No. 3 seed. The exact reverse would occur the following season, with the Patriots' starting quarterback Tom Brady winning AP MVP honors. None of the teams though, would win a Super Bowl. The 2009 Colts were defeated by the New Orleans Saints in Super Bowl XLIV while the 2010 Patriots were knocked out in the Divisional Playoffs by Mark Sanchez and divisional rival New York Jets, who had narrowly defeated the Colts 17–16 in the Wild Card round a week earlier on a last-second field goal.
- The Patriots played Super Bowl XLVI at Lucas Oil Stadium, the Colts' home field and were defeated by the New York Giants and quarterback Eli Manning, the younger brother of Peyton Manning. Manning and the Giants previously beat the Patriots in Super Bowl XLII. The majority of Colts fans rooted for Eli Manning and the Giants over their arch-rivals.
- Joseph Addai was the starting running back for the Colts for the most part from 2006 to 2011. After the 2011 season, he was released and then signed a one-year contract with the Patriots in May 2012; however he was cut before taking a snap in 2012 training camp.
- Austin Collie played his first four years in the NFL with the Colts, catching 173 passes for sixteen touchdowns (118 of his catches and fifteen of his touchdowns were from Manning); Collie signed with the Patriots in 2013; in his first game two late catches for first downs set up the game-winning score for the Patriots against New Orleans. He was released during the season but re-signed in December for the 2013 playoffs; his 15-yard catch late in the fourth quarter of the divisional playoff against the Colts set up a late Stevan Ridley touchdown.
- Deion Branch was a two-time Super Bowl Champion with the Patriots during his time with the team from 2003 to 2005, and was the MVP of Super Bowl XXXIX. He also played in one other Super Bowl for the Patriots after returning for three seasons from 2010 to 2012. On January 6, 2014, five days before the Colts were set to play the Patriots in a Divisional round game, Branch signed with Indianapolis. He was inactive during the Colts 43-22 playoff loss.
- Reggie Wayne played his first fourteen seasons (2001–14) with the Colts; against the Patriots he caught 67 passes on 118 targets for 897 yards and five touchdowns; his touchdown with thirteen seconds to go won the 4th and 2 game for the Colts in 2009. On August 24, 2015, Wayne signed a one-year, $3 million contract with the Patriots but was released from the team after a request from Wayne on September 5, 2015.
- Quarterback Jacoby Brissett was drafted by the Patriots in 2016 and played in three games in that season with wins over the Dolphins coming off the bench and against the Texans as starter. After a five-touchdown performance against the NY Giants in the 2017 preseason with the Patriots he was traded to the Colts for receiver Phillip Dorsett after a season-ending ACL tear to Patriots' star receiver Julian Edelman. Brissett became Colts starter in 2019 following the unexpected retirement of Andrew Luck.
- Josh McDaniels agreed to become Colts head coach for 2018 and even began hiring a staff such as assistant coach Joe Judge, but on February 7, a day the Colts officially announced him as head coach, he abruptly backed out of the deal to stay with the Patriots. The two teams met in 2018 for the first time in three seasons and McDaniels' Patriots won 38–24.

== Appearances in advertising ==
The rivalry forms the basis of a Sprint telecommunications television ad for their service providing NFL updates to cell phones. In the ad, a cell phone opens up to form a miniature NFL stadium with the Patriots logo in one end zone and the Colts logo in the other (the only scenarios in which this type of field layout would occur are the Pro Football Hall of Fame exhibition game and the NFL International Series). As two men watch, a winning field goal is kicked and fireworks erupt. The winner is not named but evidence suggests the Patriots, as the "game" call is by New England's radio play-by-play announcer Gil Santos.

Setting: Extra hotel night in New England
Attendant: "You're going down, Manning."
Peyton Manning: "That's right, I am. Fourth floor, I'm getting a massage today, I'm excited."

— 2008 MasterCard commercial

The rivalry is also referenced in a 2008 MasterCard ad in which Peyton Manning is staying in hotels in New England, San Diego, and Cleveland. At each stop, he misunderstands taunting comments made to him by hotel staff who are fans of the opposing teams. The New England hotel employee, a cart attendant and a Patriots fan, tells Manning he is "going down" in front of an elevator only for Manning to assume he means heading to a lower floor.

The rivalry is referenced in billboards for the United Way's "Live United" campaign, featuring the mascots of both teams together to promote the charity to which the two teams contribute.

The rivalry is also referenced in a 2010 spoof of the movie The Blind Side titled The Dark Side made for that year's ESPY awards; the piece mixes Sandra Bullock footage from the film with new footage of Manning. In the piece Bill Belichick is quoted as calling the "film" hilarious.

== See also ==
- List of NFL rivalries
- Tom Brady–Peyton Manning rivalry
