= Fake procedure =

Trick play in American football

A fake procedure is a trick play in American football. Going by a variety of names, this trick involves the quarterback getting up and walking away from his position behind the center before the snap, apparently in order to hear the call from the coach or to call a timeout.

However, as one player is allowed to be in motion before the snap, play is not technically stopped. If the defense relaxes, believing the quarterback is about to walk to the sidelines, the ball can be snapped to one of the other players and played against a defense that is unprepared. If the defense is not fooled, the quarterback can simply complete the fake task, and return to the center to call the snap.

The Indianapolis Colts, New Orleans Saints, Pittsburgh Steelers, and St. Louis Rams have used variations of this play in the NFL, and it was also used in the movie The Longest Yard for a winning two-point conversion. Under some state high school rules, if the quarterback or coaches on the sideline say anything that may lead the defense to believe that a snap is not imminent, then the play is not legal under the Unfair Act section of Rule 9.
