= Tom Brady–Peyton Manning rivalry =

American football quarterback rivalry

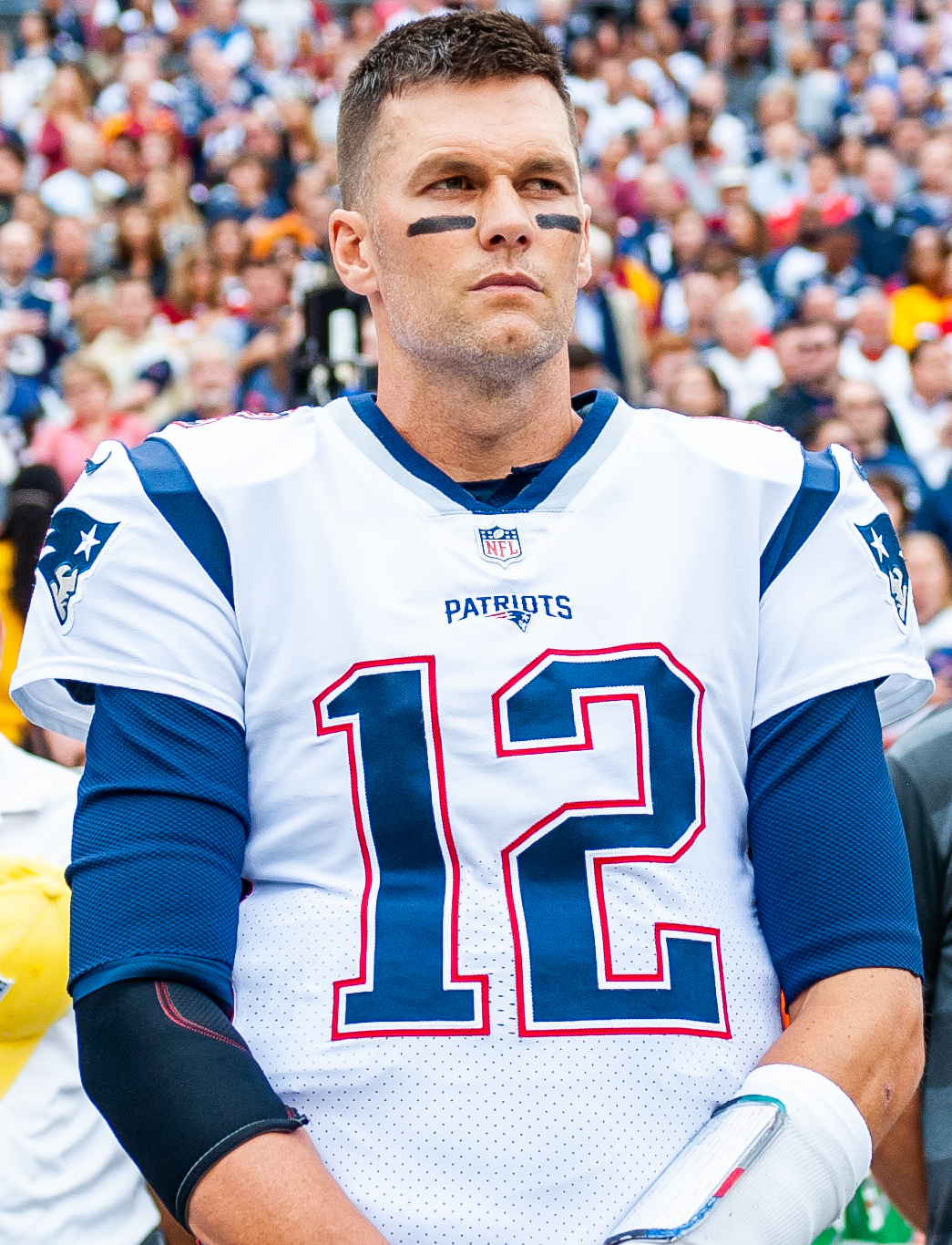
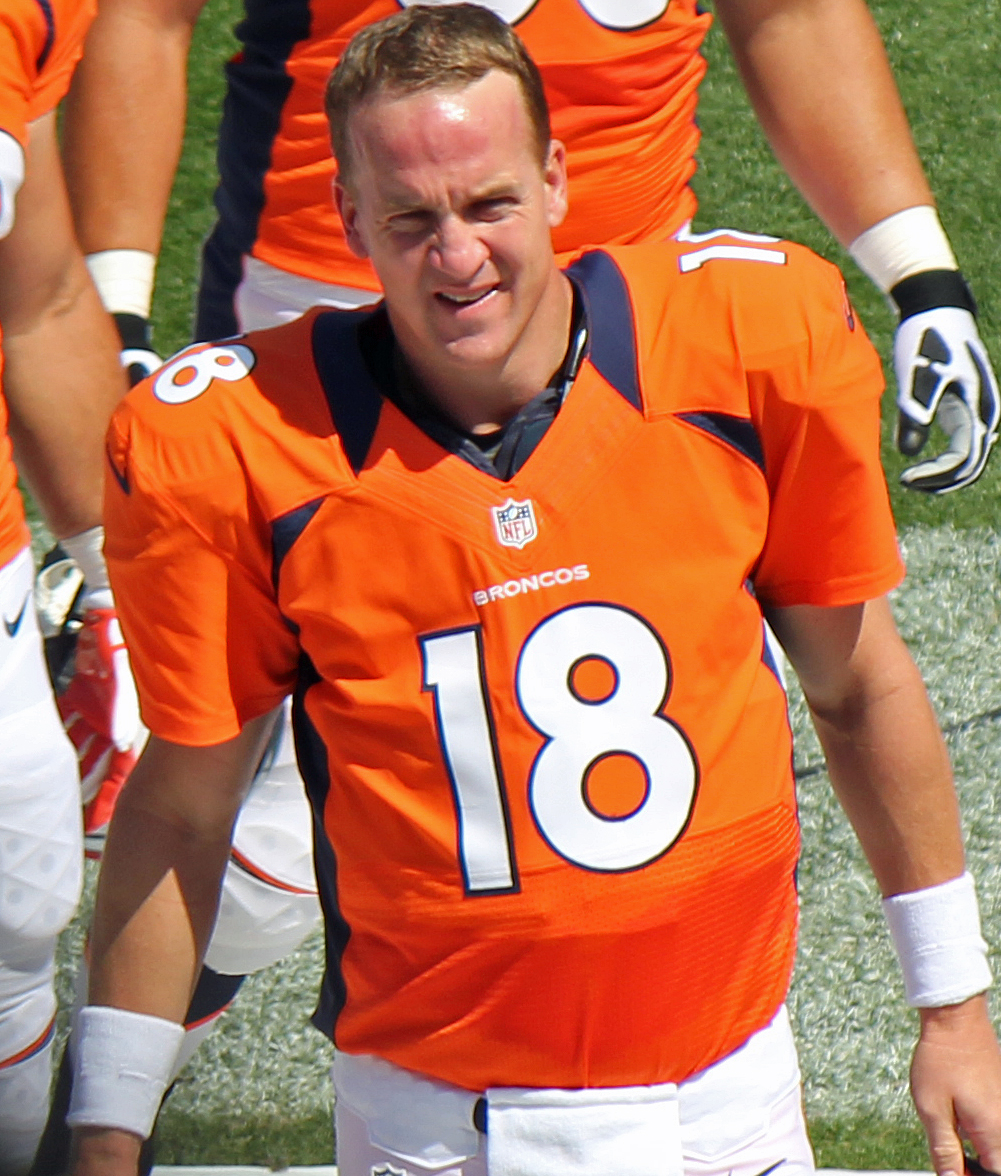
Tom Brady (left) and Peyton Manning (right)

The Tom Brady–Peyton Manning rivalry was a series of games that took place between 2001 and 2015 involving two quarterbacks in the National Football League (NFL): Tom Brady and Peyton Manning. It is considered by many to be the greatest individual NFL rivalry of all time, and has been compared to other legendary sports rivalries, such as Magic–Bird in basketball, Ali–Frazier in boxing, and Messi–Ronaldo in soccer.

Both quarterbacks are considered to be among the greatest in NFL history. Brady won a record seven Super Bowl championships in his career (as well as a record five Super Bowl MVPs), while Manning won two Super Bowl championships (and one Super Bowl MVP) in his career. On the other hand, Manning would go on to win a record five MVP awards in his 18-year career, while Brady would win three in his 23-year career. Both quarterbacks also made the Pro Bowl fourteen or more times in their careers, and both were selected to the NFL 100th Anniversary All-Time Team in 2019. Brady and Manning are the only starting quarterbacks to win Super Bowls with multiple franchises, and are believed by many as the best NFL players of the 2000s and 2010s.

Despite their rivalry, the two former quarterbacks have a close and longstanding friendship, and frequently make media appearances and conduct interviews together.

== Background ==
Tom Brady played for the New England Patriots from 2000, when he was the 199th selection in the sixth round of the 2000 NFL draft, through 2019. After Drew Bledsoe was injured in week 2 of the 2001 season, Brady got his first career start against Peyton Manning's Indianapolis Colts, winning the game 44–13. Brady was the Patriots' starting quarterback until the team's final game of the 2019 season, with the exception of 2008, when he tore his ACL in the opening game, and 2016, when he was suspended for the first four games of the season due to his alleged involvement in the Deflategate scandal. Brady appeared in a record ten Super Bowls (nine with the Patriots, one with the Tampa Bay Buccaneers) and won a record seven (six with the Patriots, one with the Buccaneers).

Manning was drafted by the Colts in the 1998 NFL draft as the number 1 pick, and played for the Colts until the team's final game of the 2010 season, as a neck injury caused him to miss the entire 2011 season. The Colts finished 2–14 that year in his absence and secured the #1 pick in the draft where he became expendable once the consensus top prospect, quarterback Andrew Luck of Stanford, was available. During his time with the Colts, Manning led them to two Super Bowls, winning one. On March 20, 2012, after fourteen years with the Colts, Manning signed with the Denver Broncos, for whom he played until his retirement following the 2015 season. He led the Broncos to two Super Bowl appearances, winning Super Bowl 50 in what would be his final game. Like Brady, Manning led his new team to their first Super Bowl win in nearly two decades.

== Rivalry ==
Peyton was someone that I always just admired as a quarterback, as a leader of a team. I always looked up to Peyton because he was a little older than me and always doing things the right way. His team was always in it. I know our teams had a rivalry against one another, but when you went against a Peyton-led team, you were going against the best team in the league.

— Tom Brady in 2021

Manning and Brady played each other seventeen times. Brady won the overall head-to-head series 11–6, but Manning won the AFC conference championship head-to-head series 3–1. From 2001 to 2015, the two quarterbacks met at least once every season, except 2002, 2008, and 2011; while Brady's Patriots and Manning's Colts played each other in 2008 and 2011, Brady missed the 2008 season and Manning missed the 2011 season, both due to injuries (Brady with an ACL tear suffered Week 1 and Manning with neck problems). The two quarterbacks did not meet during the 2015 regular season (Brady's Patriots did play Manning's Broncos, but Manning missed the game due to a plantar fasciitis injury), though they met in that year's AFC Championship Game.

Brady won the Colts–Patriots series 8–4 and also won the Broncos–Patriots series 3–2, though Manning's two wins with the Broncos both occurred in the AFC Championship Games in 2013 and 2015. Brady led the series in Foxborough 8–2, while Manning led the series in Indianapolis/Denver 4–3.

The two quarterbacks met five times in the NFL Playoffs, in which Manning won three of them (all five were won by the home team, as Brady's two wins both came in Foxborough). Four of the five match-ups were in the AFC Championship Game, with Manning winning three of the four, one of the games with the Colts (2006) and another two with the Broncos (2013, 2015). The winner of each of the playoff match-ups went on to represent the AFC in the Super Bowl. Four of the teams, Brady's 2003 and 2004 Patriots and Manning's 2006 Colts and 2015 Broncos went on to win the Super Bowl, while Manning's 2013 Broncos lost the game.

== Outside of football ==
Despite their rivalry for status as the league's best quarterback, Brady and Manning maintained a strong mutual respect, admiration and liking. When Brady's season ended due to a knee injury in the opening game of the 2008 season, Manning called to check in with his counterpart. After his surgically replaced knee developed a staph infection, Brady remembered Manning previously had a similar issue and called him for advice. During the Deflategate scandal, a leaked email showed Brady saying that he thought Manning’s playing days were limited, writing, “I’ve got another 7 or 8 years. He has 2.” Manning publicly defended Brady over the email, stating that Brady gave him an apology that was "unnecessary". Manning also said the fact that Brady's emails leaked did not make any sense to him. A photo with Manning posted by Brady on Twitter in 2019 had the caption "Spoiler alert... we were friends this whole time."

In May 2020, Manning and Brady participated alongside Tiger Woods and Phil Mickelson in the rematch of The Match: Tiger vs. Phil as a charity fundraiser for COVID-19 pandemic relief.

When Manning was inducted into the Pro Football Hall of Fame in 2021, Brady attended his enshrinement ceremony and quipped on Twitter that he needed "to make sure (Manning's) really done. Can't risk this guy coming back..." Manning acknowledged Brady during his speech, saying "next year acceptance speeches will probably shrink to four minutes. And speaking of rivals, my good friend Tom Brady is here tonight. By the time he is inducted in his first year of eligibility in the year of 2035, he will only have time to post his acceptance speech on his Instagram account." Also at the event were Bruce Arians and Tom Moore, both of whom coached Manning in Indianapolis and Brady in Tampa Bay.

== Results ==
Tom Brady vs. Peyton Manning Game-by-Game Results
Brady's Patriots vs. Manning's Colts (Brady, 8–4)

| Season | Results | Location | Series | Notes |
|---|---|---|---|---|
| 2001 | Patriots; 44–13 | Foxborough | Brady 1–0 | Brady's first career start. |
| 2001 | Patriots; 38–17 | Indianapolis | Brady 2–0 | The only season they played twice in the regular season. Patriots win Super Bowl XXXVI. |
| 2003 | Patriots; 38–34 | Indianapolis | Brady 3–0 | Patriots make a goal-line stand inside the final minute to preserve the win. |
| 2003 playoffs | Patriots; 24–14 | Foxborough | Brady 4–0 | AFC Championship Game. First postseason meeting. Peyton Manning throws 4 interceptions. Patriots win Super Bowl XXXVIII. |
| 2004 | Patriots; 27–24 | Foxborough | Brady 5–0 | NFL Kickoff Game. |
| 2004 playoffs | Patriots; 20–3 | Foxborough | Brady 6–0 | AFC Divisional playoffs. Patriots win Super Bowl XXXIX. |
| 2005 | Colts; 40–21 | Foxborough | Brady 6–1 | Peyton Manning's first victory of the series. |
| 2006 | Colts; 27–20 | Foxborough | Brady 6–2 | First game featured on NBC Sunday Night Football. |
| 2006 playoffs | Colts; 38–34 | Indianapolis | Brady 6–3 | AFC Championship Game. Colts overcome 21–3 deficit. Colts win Super Bowl XLI. |
| 2007 | Patriots; 24–20 | Indianapolis | Brady 7–3 | Patriots were 8–0 and the Colts were 7–0 entering the meeting. Patriots lose Super Bowl XLII. |
| 2009 | Colts; 35–34 | Indianapolis | Brady 7–4 | Manning and the Colts overcame a 31–14 fourth-quarter deficit. Only regular-season home game Manning won. Colts lose Super Bowl XLIV. |
| 2010 | Patriots; 31–28 | Foxborough | Brady 8–4 | |

Brady's Patriots vs. Manning's Broncos (Brady, 3–2)

| Season | Results | Location | Series | Notes |
|---|---|---|---|---|
| 2012 | Patriots; 31–21 | Foxborough | Brady 9–4 | |
| 2013 | Patriots; 34–31 (OT) | Foxborough | Brady 10–4 | Patriots overcome a 24–0 halftime deficit. Only meeting to go into overtime in the history of the rivalry. |
| 2013 playoffs | Broncos; 26–16 | Denver | Brady 10–5 | AFC Championship Game. Broncos lose Super Bowl XLVIII. |
| 2014 | Patriots; 43–21 | Foxborough | Brady 11–5 | Patriots win Super Bowl XLIX. |
| 2015 playoffs | Broncos; 20–18 | Denver | Brady 11–6 | AFC Championship Game; Broncos win Super Bowl 50. |

Summary of Results

| Season | Season series | at New England | at Indianapolis/Denver | Notes |
|---|---|---|---|---|
| Regular season | Brady 9–3 | Brady 6–2 | Brady 3–1 | All four Manning home games were in Indianapolis. |
| Postseason | Manning 3–2 | Brady 2–0 | Manning 3–0 | Manning was 1–0 in Indianapolis and 2–0 in Denver. AFC Divisional: 2004; AFC Championship: 2003, 2006, 2013, 2015 |
| Regular and postseason | Brady 11–6 | Brady 8–2 | Manning 4–3 | Manning was 2–3 in Indianapolis and 2–0 in Denver |

== Career statistics ==
=== Regular season ===
| Player | G | ATT | CMP | CMP% | YDS | AVG | Y/G | TD | INT | LNG | SK | RATE | RUSH YDS | RUSH ATT | RUSH TD | NFL MVPs |
|---|---|---|---|---|---|---|---|---|---|---|---|---|---|---|---|---|
| Peyton Manning | 266 | 9,380 | 6,125 | 65.3 | 71,940 | 7.7 | 270.5 | 539 | 251 | 86 | 303 | 96.5 | 667 | 431 | 18 | 5 |
| Tom Brady | 335 | 12,050 | 7,753 | 64.3 | 89,214 | 7.4 | 266.3 | 649 | 212 | 99 | 565 | 97.2 | 1,123 | 693 | 28 | 3 |

=== Postseason ===
| Player | G | ATT | CMP | CMP% | YDS | AVG | Y/G | TD | INT | LNG | SK | RATE | RUSH YDS | RUSH ATT | RUSH TD |
|---|---|---|---|---|---|---|---|---|---|---|---|---|---|---|---|
| Peyton Manning | 27 | 1,027 | 649 | 63.2 | 7,339 | 7.1 | 271.8 | 40 | 25 | 87 | 40 | 87.4 | 34 | 32 | 3 |
| Tom Brady | 48 | 1,921 | 1,200 | 62.5 | 13,400 | 7.0 | 279.2 | 88 | 40 | 73 | 81 | 89.8 | 133 | 114 | 7 |

=== Super Bowl ===
| Player | G | ATT | CMP | CMP% | YDS | AVG | Y/G | TD | INT | LNG | SK | RATE | RUSH YDS | RUSH ATT | RUSH TD | SB Wins | SB MVPs |
|---|---|---|---|---|---|---|---|---|---|---|---|---|---|---|---|---|---|
| Peyton Manning | 4 | 155 | 103 | 66.5 | 1,001 | 6.5 | 250.3 | 3 | 5 | 53 | 7 | 77.4 | 0 | 2 | 0 | 2 | 1 |
| Tom Brady | 10 | 421 | 277 | 65.8 | 3,039 | 7.2 | 303.9 | 21 | 6 | 52 | 19 | 97.7 | 28 | 14 | 0 | 7 | 5 |
