= Fumblerooski =

Tactic in American football

In American football, the fumblerooski is a trick play in which the football is intentionally and stealthily placed on the ground (fumbled) by an offensive player, usually the quarterback. The offensive team then attempts to distract and confuse the defense by pretending that a ball carrier is running in one direction while another offensive player retrieves the ball from the turf and runs in a different direction, hoping to gain significant yardage before the defense realizes which player is actually carrying the football.

The fumblerooski traces its roots back to deceptive plays from the early days of football, and the infrequent usage of the play and its variations in the modern game often draws much fan and media attention. The NCAA banned the original version of the play following the 1992 season. In the NFL, the play has been considered an "intentional forward fumble" for many years, which would make the play an incomplete pass, but a version in which the quarterback places the ball behind him is still legal.

== Description ==
The fumblerooski typically begins with the quarterback deliberately placing (or in some cases bouncing) the ball on the turf immediately upon receiving the snap from the center, technically fumbling it. The quarterback then either runs as if he still has the ball or pretends to hand it to another player in an attempt to trick the defense into thinking that the offense is executing a conventional running play, often towards the sideline. Once the flow of the defense is moving away from the ball, a predetermined offensive player (often an offensive lineman) secretly picks it up and runs in a different direction, trying to gain as many yards as possible before the defense realizes that they are not pursuing the actual ball carrier.

There are several variations on the play, but they all rely on the element of surprise and misdirection, as the play is easily stopped and a turnover could result if a defender notices the ball being placed on the turf.

== Origin and notable uses ==
The origin of the fumblerooski goes back to the early days of football, when similar trick plays were relatively common, and has been attributed to pioneering coach John Heisman. An early documented use of the fumblerooski came in 1930, when University of Tennessee quarterback Bobby Dodd called the fumble play in a game against Florida. The play, which Dodd later said he had also run with his high school team, went for a long gain on the Volunteers' only offensive scoring drive during their win. It was also used by Greenville High School during the 1933 Texas High School Football Championship.

In the 1984 Orange Bowl game, #1 ranked Nebraska trailed Miami 17–0 after the first quarter. Early in the second quarter, Nebraska coach Tom Osborne called for the play, whereby Nebraska quarterback Turner Gill effectively "fumbled" the snap from center Mark Traynowicz, by setting it on the turf. The ball was picked up by offensive guard Dean Steinkuhler, who ran the ball 19 yards for a touchdown. Nebraska had run the play before, having first tried it twice in a 17–14 loss to Oklahoma in 1979. Reflecting on the game (which Miami eventually won) years later, Miami coach Howard Schnellenberger denounced the use of the play:

"We had to come up with some good plays at the end there to win it, but we did force them to resort to the fucking fumblerooski. I told them before the game if those bastards have to run the fumblerooski, come to the sidelines and party because they have given up their right of manhood."

The play was used by the Oklahoma Sooners four years later in the 1988 Orange Bowl game, also against the Miami Hurricanes, who fell prey to the fumblerooski in a national championship game for a second time. Sooner quarterback Charles Thompson left the ball for offensive guard Mark Hutson, who proceeded to run for a touchdown. Oklahoma would go on to suffer the same fate as Nebraska four years earlier, in that they would eventually lose to Miami 20–14, costing them their undefeated season and their national championship.

On October 20, 1990 Florida State tried to run the play against Auburn in the 4th quarter while holding a 7-point lead. However, an Auburn defender saw the football on the field and fell on the intentional fumble before FSU's guard could get to it. Auburn would score the tying touchdown on the ensuing drive and eventually win on a last-second field goal by Jim Von Wyl, marking one of the very rare occasions that the play failed.

Tulane appeared to execute the play for a 21-yard touchdown run against Alabama in a game on October 10, 1992; however, guard Andy Abramowicz's knee was on the ground as he picked up the ball, resulting in him being down at the spot.

Nebraska used the play again on October 31, 1992, in a 52–7 victory over Colorado. The ball was carried by offensive guard Will Shields, who gained a first down but did not score.

In November 1992, the play was run by the Maryland Terrapins against the Clemson Tigers. Senior guard, Ron Staffileno, scored a touchdown from 11 yards out. He is the last person to score on the fumblerooski in its original form.

Like the NFL in the 1960s, the NCAA banned the use of the fumblerooski after the 1992 season, making intentional fumbles illegal. In April 2006, the NFHS followed suit, banning intentional fumbles, according to the Los Angeles Times. However, longtime former NFL referee Jerry Markbreit says the play is still legal, provided the quarterback places the ball on the ground behind himself, rather than in front (the forward fumble was banned as the result of another play, the Holy Roller). Direct handoffs to offensive linemen are still thoroughly legal, meaning that the play can still be executed as originally devised, except the ball must be handed off instead of left on the ground to be picked up. Furthermore, since 2008, the center himself can execute the fumble (which in NFL rules is a backward pass, distinct from a fumble) and the ball will be live once the ball hits the ground.

On November 23, 2013, the Fresno State Bulldogs successfully executed a fumblerooski on their home field against the New Mexico Lobos, scoring on a 26-yard touchdown run by senior wide receiver Isaiah Burse with 10:27 remaining in the second quarter. The Bulldogs would go on to defeat the Lobos 69–28 and clinch the Western division of the Mountain West Conference.

The Washington Football Team used the Bumerooski on Thanksgiving Day, November 26, 2020, in a regular season game against the Dallas Cowboys, which resulted in a 10+ yard gain and a 1st down. Quarterback Alex Smith took the snap and handed off the ball very discreetly through running back J. D. McKissic's legs who was positioned low and just to the right of Smith. Smith faked a run to the right, while McKissic aptly outmaneuvered defenders for a 10-yard gain and a first down. TV broadcast color commentator and Hall of Fame quarterback Troy Aikman made extensive commentary on the broadcast about this play, comparing it to a fumblerooski.

== Similar plays ==
=== Bumerooski ===
A variation of the play is known as the Bumerooski. The Bumerooski is named after former NFL head coach Bum Phillips. In this variation a handoff is made to a player between his legs. This play is still legal in the NFL and NCAA, as the ball never touches the ground.

On December 10, 2006, the San Diego Chargers ran a successful Bumerooski against the Denver Broncos that resulted in a 4-yard touchdown run for fullback Lorenzo Neal's first touchdown of the season. Wide receiver Vincent Jackson was lined up in the backfield with running back LaDainian Tomlinson. The ball was snapped to quarterback Philip Rivers, who handed the ball to Neal between his legs. After the handoff, Rivers and Tomlinson both sprinted right, with Rivers faking a handoff to Jackson faking an end-around right. At the same time, Neal faked a block, and, with the defense still unaware that he had the ball, sprinted left for the touchdown. Bum Phillips' son Wade was the defensive coordinator for the Chargers.

In the 2009 Pro Bowl, Le'Ron McClain scored a touchdown on a modified fumblerooski, closely resembling the Bumerooski.

The Carolina Panthers used a variation of the Bumerooski on December 18, 2011, in a regular season game against the Houston Texans which resulted in a touchdown by fullback Richie Brockel. Cam Newton handed off the ball to Brockel through his legs and faked the run to the right, while Brockel went left.

=== Bounce rooski ===
Another variation is the "bounce rooski", in which the quarterback throws a pass behind him that bounces along the ground and to a wide receiver, attempting to fool the defense into thinking it was an incomplete pass. Once the defense is relaxed, believing the play to be over, the wide receiver (or even an ineligible receiver such as an offensive tackle) can then simply throw it to a player downfield, since a lateral not recovered by either team remains a live ball.

Texas A&M used this play, calling it the "Texas Special", in a 1965 game against the University of Texas, taking a 17–0 lead in what was nearly a big upset before eventually falling 21–17. Colorado State used this to upset #10 Wyoming in 1966. Nebraska completed this against Oklahoma in the 1982 NCAA season, with Turner Gill throwing a one-bounce backwards pass to Irving Fryar, who then threw a forward pass to Mitch Krenk.

Wisconsin successfully executed this play against Illinois in 1982.

During their first game of the 2010 NCAA season, Wake Forest fell for the bounce rooski run by Presbyterian College. Immediately after the snap, Presbyterian quarterback Brandon Miley threw what appeared to be an incomplete short pass to the side, to WR Derrick Overholt. The ball bounced off the ground but into the hands of Overholt, who then feigned disappointment. The Wake Forest defenders fell for Overholt's incomplete-pass theatrics, not realizing the pass was backwards, making it a live ball. Overholt then threw the ball downfield to waiting WR Michael Ruff who was wide open and subsequently ran the ball into the end zone for a 68-yard touchdown. Wake Forest would, however, go on to win the game by a score of 53–13.

=== Stumblerooski (Stumblebum) ===
On December 22, 2024, the Detroit Lions were playing against the Chicago Bears when they pulled off this unusual variation, which resulted in a 21-yard touchdown. Right after the snap, Detroit Lions quarterback Jared Goff appeared to stumble to the ground and fumble the ball, though he never actually lost control. What appeared to be a failed handoff to RB Jahmyr Gibbs, who was also on the ground, was instead a pass to TE Sam LaPorta. As Goff stumbled, many offensive players shouted "Fumble!" in order to further sell the deception. The play was designed after Detroit's offensive coordinator Ben Johnson saw the Green Bay Packers's quarterback Jordan Love complete a touchdown pass to his tight end after fumbling the snap. According to Goff after the game, the name of the play run by Detroit was a "stumblebum." This play would effectively put the game out of reach and the Lions would go on to win the game by a score of 34–17.

== In other popular culture ==
The fumblerooski is featured as a play setting up the climax of the 1994 film Little Giants, in which the Little Giants score on the game's final play. In the film, the play was called "The Annexation of Puerto Rico", though the opposing coach played by Ed O'Neill correctly identifies the play, shouting "Fumblerooski! Fumblerooski!" This scene later served as the inspiration for the aforementioned December 2011 play by the Carolina Panthers.

The fumblerooski was used in the 2005 remake of The Longest Yard to bring the prisoners within one point of the officers on the last play of regulation (pending the two-point conversion).

It was also featured in the 2008 film The Longshots, starring Ice Cube.

== See also ==
- American football strategy
- Hidden ball trick
- Flea flicker (American football)
- Holy Roller (American football)
- Statue of Liberty play
- Trick play
