= Statue of Liberty play =

Trick play in American football

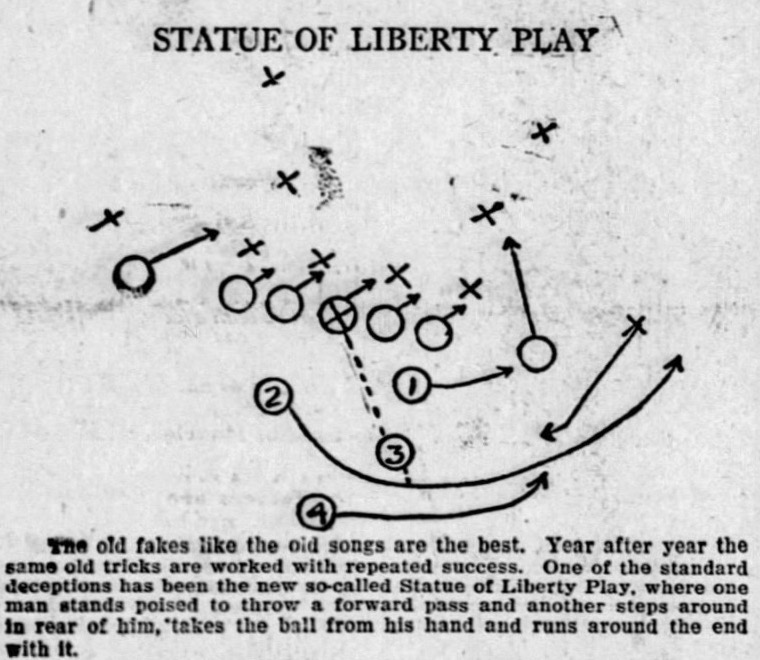
Diagram from a 1923 newspaper showing one way to run the Statue of Liberty play

The Statue of Liberty is a trick play in American football named after, and resembling New York City's Statue of Liberty (Liberty Enlightening the World).

== Execution of the play ==
Although many variations of the play exist, the most common involves the quarterback taking the snap from the center, dropping back, and gripping the ball with two hands as if he were to throw. He then places the ball behind his back with his non-throwing hand, while pretending to throw to one side of the field with his other hand. While his arm is still in motion during the fake throw, he hands the ball off behind his back to a running back or a wide receiver in motion, who runs the football to the opposite side of the field. The objective is to trick the defense out of position, leaving them unable to catch up with the runner as he moves in the direction opposite to the fake.

The play is named after the positioning of the quarterback as he hands the ball off. If done correctly, he should have one hand in the air and the other at his side, resembling the pose of the Statue of Liberty. When executed properly, the Statue of Liberty is a deceptive and high-yardage play. However, the coordination of motions required is difficult, and failure may lead to a fumble, sack, or lost yardage. Additionally, disciplined defenses may be able to spot the fake.

== History of the play ==
Amos Alonzo Stagg was the first to call the play, and Stagg credited Clarence Herschberger with being the first player to run the play. The play was made popular by Fielding H. Yost during his tenure as head coach of the football team at the University of Michigan.

This play was also a part of the offensive repertoire of the NFL's Los Angeles Rams teams of the mid-1970s under coach Chuck Knox.

=== Notable examples ===
The Northwestern Wildcats employed a direct-snap variant of this play in the 1949 Rose Bowl to run for a 45-yard touchdown in the final minutes of the game, defeating the heavily favored California Golden Bears, 20–14.

The Baltimore Colts ran a version of the play in December 1970. Led by 37-year-old quarterback Johnny Unitas, the Colts beat the Oakland Raiders in the 1970 AFC Championship game, 27–17.

The 2007 Fiesta Bowl featured a widely reported and frequently replayed use of the play, executed by Jared Zabransky and Ian Johnson of the Boise State Broncos against the Oklahoma Sooners. The play, known as "Statue Left" by the Broncos and run from a trips shotgun set, clinched Boise State a two-point conversion for the overtime victory. This bowl game is referred to as one of the closest and most exciting college football games of all time, due in part to the do-or-die nature of this play.

In a regular-season matchup against the Michigan Wolverines in 2007, Oregon Ducks quarterback Dennis Dixon faked a Statue of Liberty to running back Jonathan Stewart (somewhat like a bootleg) and then ran for a touchdown almost unseen.

Oklahoma saw another Statue of Liberty play in their September 6, 2008, game against the Cincinnati Bearcats. Bearcats quarterback Dustin Grutza handed off to John Goebel, but the Sooners stopped Goebel for only a short gain.

Boise State executed the same play described above nearly eight years later—once against the Wyoming Cowboys, and also while facing the Arizona Wildcats in the Fiesta Bowl. Both plays resulted in touchdowns for Jay Ajayi.

The New England Patriots employed an unusual variant of the play in their 2007 NFL divisional playoff game against the Jacksonville Jaguars. Strictly speaking, the play, which the Patriots called "Double Pop," was actually a reverse Statue of Liberty play, in that the run, not the pass, was the fake element. Center Dan Koppen faked a direct snap to Patriots running back Kevin Faulk, causing the defense to move to stop the run; meanwhile, Patriots quarterback Tom Brady, who received the football, faked an over-the-head snap, and held the Statue of Liberty pose with his back to the defense before turning around and throwing a touchdown pass to wide receiver Wes Welker in the back of the end zone.

In the 2023 NFL Wildcard playoff round, the New York Giants used a Statue of Liberty play in their 31–24 victory against the Minnesota Vikings.

== In popular culture ==
The execution of the Statue of Liberty play was detailed in The Brady Bunch television series in the 1973 episode "QuarterBack Sneak".

In the 1995 Simpsons Halloween episode "Treehouse of Horror VI" during Bart's dream of winning the Super Bowl, Krusty the Clown calls the play but alters its design to a normal forward pass.

== See also ==
- American football strategy
- Flea flicker
- Fumblerooski
- Hook and lateral
