= Fake punt =

Trick play in gridiron football

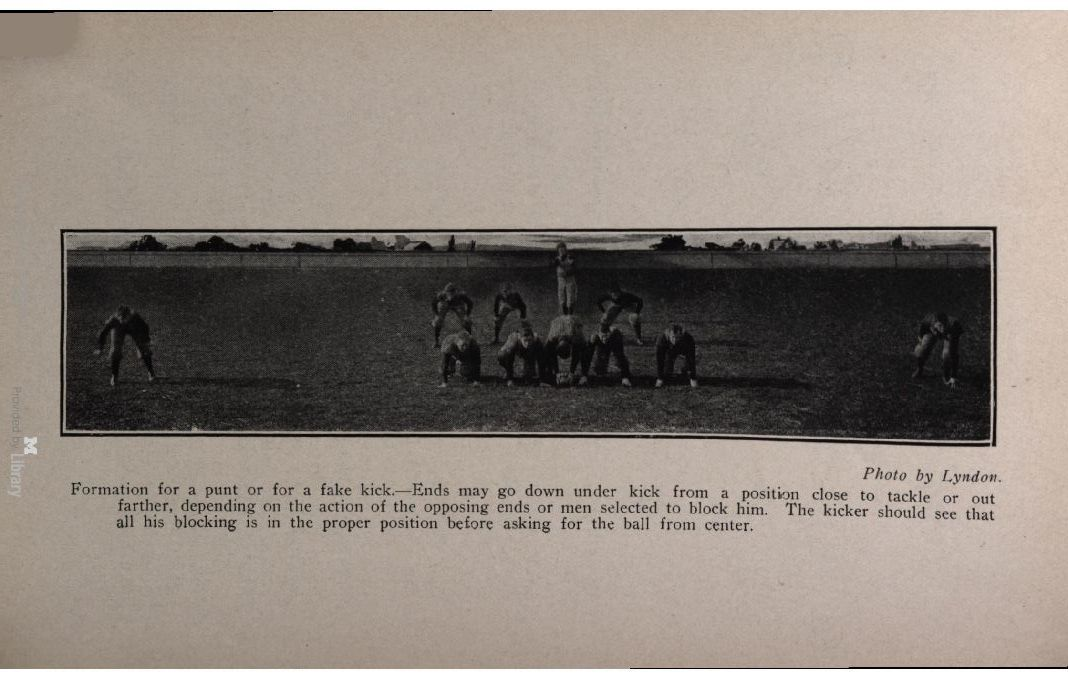
"A formation for a punt or for a fake kick", circa 1905

A fake punt is a trick play in gridiron football. It involves a running or passing play run out of a punt formation.

A fake punt can take a number of different forms. The punter may simply take the snap and look to throw a forward pass or run with the ball after the defenders have turned downfield to block for the punt return. Alternately, the ball may be snapped directly to one of the backs (usually a halfback or fullback) who then runs downfield or throws.
