= Swinging gate (American football) =

American football trick play

The Swinging Gate, sometimes referred to as the muddle huddle, is an unorthodox set-piece play in American football, executed in either the offensive or special-teams sections of play. It is unusual in that the offensive line, with the exception of the center, will line up to one side of the field, leaving the quarterback and running back unprotected on the other. Its goal is to disconcert a defensive front in order to allow a quick screen pass to a wide receiver with six blockers, or to allow a short run by the running back. Surprise is the main goal of the play, and it is not typically run outside of short-yardage situations.

The play, originally formulated in the 1930s, still retains a modicum of popularity on high school and college teams, where the lesser athleticism of the players will allow the play to be performed with a greater degree of success. An example of the play can be found in the closing scenes of Adam Sandler's remake of the movie The Longest Yard, where Sandler's team executes the play successfully.

== Offensive ==
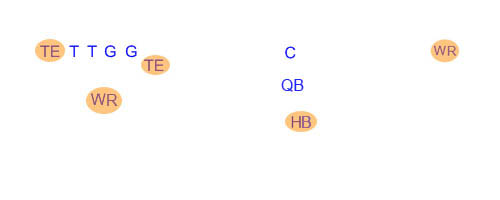
The passing swinging gate formation. Eligible receivers are circled in orange.

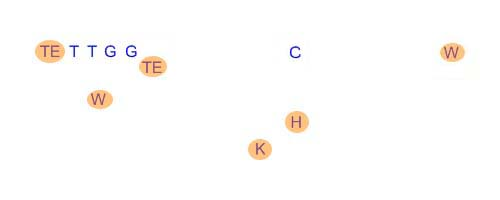
In the special-teams formation, the holder is an eligible receiver if the kicker decides to throw the ball, and vice versa

The offensive form of the play is rarely run, for the reasons above. However, it does offer several advantages to coaches willing to run it. With five eligible receivers, there are a multitude of targets for the quarterback, though he must get the ball off quickly, before the defense can recover from the initial (presumed) surprise at the unorthodox formation. The receiver at the far left will have six blockers, a crucial advantage for longer situations.

A rushing attack with the formation tends to be useful only in short-yardage situations, as the lack of blockers for the running back will hamper any longer runs. The formation is typically used as a setup for a pass when not used on special teams.

== Special teams ==
The other, more common, use of the Swinging Gate formation is on special teams, as the offensive team attempts a two-point conversion. The unusual formation allows several different attacks, one of which is a rushing attack, which, thanks to the short yardage needed, is practical in a way that is not on an ordinary play using this formation. If in a situation where the coach finds that his team does not absolutely require a successful two-point conversion, he may give his quarterback permission to call an audible and turn the play into a field goal attempt. In this "slide," the players on the line move back to the center, the quarterback becomes the holder for a place kick, and the halfback becomes the kicker.

Some teams initially line up in the formation for every or nearly every extra-point attempt before shifting back into a conventional placekicking formation. The reasons for doing this are (1) to attempt to catch the opposing team off guard and only then try a pass or run for two points and (2) to prevent the opposing team from blocking the PAT kick. If the opposing team lines up properly to defend against a run or pass from this formation, the team will not have enough time for its players to get into position to block a kick once the offense has shifted back into a conventional placekicking formation.

This formation was utilized extensively on point-after-attempts at Southern Methodist University (SMU) during head coach Phil Bennett's tenure from 2002–2007. It was also used extensively on point-after-attempts at University of Oregon during head coach Chip Kelly's tenure from 2009–2012.

== Examples in NFL ==
It is not often found in the NFL, due to the danger of a quarterback injury. In a Wild Card playoff game on January 6, 2008, against the San Diego Chargers, the Tennessee Titans lined up in the Swinging Gate formation on their first play from scrimmage. Tennessee quarterback Vince Young threw an incomplete pass on the play. In a December 21, 2009, game between the Washington Redskins and the New York Giants, the Redskins attempted this play with Hunter Smith, the punter, at quarterback, which resulted in an interception.

During an October 18, 2015, game between the New England Patriots and the Indianapolis Colts, in a widely ridiculed playcall, the Colts lined up in a swinging gate formation that resulted in a botched play and a turnover on downs.

A different version of the swinging gate was used by the Cincinnati Bengals during their 2015 season, nicknamed the "Star Wars formation" and shifting only two blockers to the side of the formation instead of four.

On January 22, 2023, during the divisional round of the playoffs, with 5 seconds left, the Dallas Cowboys lined up in a swinging gate formation against the San Francisco 49ers. Running back Ezekiel Elliott positioned as the center, snapped the ball to Dak Prescott, who passed to KaVontae Turpin, who was tackled by Jimmie Ward, ending the game.
