= Trick play =

Deceptive play in gridiron football

A trick play, also known as a gadget play, gimmick play or trickeration, is a play in gridiron football that uses deception and unorthodox tactics to fool the opposing team. A trick play is often risky, offering the potential for a large gain or a touchdown if it is successful, but with the chance of a significant loss of yards or a turnover if not. Trick plays are rarely used not only because of the riskiness, but also to maintain the element of surprise for when they are used.

Trick plays take advantage of defenses' expectations and conventional wisdom, the set of basic principles to which most offenses adhere. Most offenses follow a basic set of conventions in that once the ball is snapped to the quarterback, it seldom changes hands more than once: a hand-off or pitch to a running back, or a forward pass, and the players with the best skill sets for those particular plays are the ones that will execute them.

For example, the quarterback is by far the best passer on the field in most situations and would thus be relied upon for the vast majority of forward passes; likewise, kickers are, in the modern era, seldom relied upon for anything other than kicking. The typical American football playbook relies on simple, relatively low-risk plays with high odds of gaining yardage and low odds of catastrophe (a turnover, loss of yardage or, in the worst-case scenario, the other team scoring points). Trick plays eschew these principles: trick plays can easily exploit a defensive weakness if it is not foreseen, but if the trick is foreseen, it can be easily foiled and the play will often yield catastrophic results.

== Background ==
In most conventional forms of American football, the quarterback receives the ball during the snap and then either throws it or hands it off to another player. That player, the "receiver", attempts to move the ball forward past the line of scrimmage. If they are successful, the line moves forward to that point and the process continues through a series of "plays", eventually (ideally) to a touchdown.

Due to a variety of interacting rules, offensive plays generally fall into two distinct groups. Plays where the (planned) source of gains are through the quarterback throwing the ball forward are known as "passing plays", while those where the gains are due to the player running with the ball are "rushing plays". Rules governing which players are eligible to receive a pass results in the offensive team being split into groups; the offensive linemen protect the quarterback, wide receivers and tight-ends are positioned at the line to run forward to receive passes, and the backs are positioned behind the line to receive the ball in a hand-off and then continue running forward for a rush.

The defensive team is not privy to which type of play will develop. To protect against common plays, their line ends up divided up much the same way as the offense, with the defensive tackle at the front both holding the line as well as attempting to threaten the quarterback, the defensive backs positioned behind the line to protect against pass plays, and the linebackers positioned to counter a rush. Once the play starts, the defensive players tend to collapse towards the action, preventing forward motion of the rush, or blocking a pass. This commitment to a course of action is typically safe; there is only one forward pass allowed per play, so once the ball is passed the rushers are out of the action and all the defenders can attempt to block the receiver, and while anyone can throw the ball forward, doing so is so specialized that once the quarterback hands off the ball or tosses to a runner, the possibility of a forward pass is generally eliminated.

Trick plays attempt to cause the defense to commit to a play in order to leave them badly out of position for the play that actually develops. A simple example is the end-around play, where one of the eligible receivers runs parallel to the line of scrimmage (see man-in-motion), takes the ball from the quarterback in a handoff or lateral toss, and then starts a rush. As the receiver would normally be expected to run down the field in order to catch a forward pass, the defensive back assigned to cover that motion starts opposite him some distance behind the line. If the back does not move laterally to match the motion of the receiver, the receiver may find themselves unopposed on the opposite side of the line once the play develops.

More dangerous trick plays normally combine multiple passes or hand-offs. In the Flea Flicker, the ball is handed-off or laterally passed to a player in what appears to be a rush play. The player then passes the ball back to the quarterback, who throws it to the receivers. Properly timed, the defensive team will have started responding to the rush by moving forward, leaving the receivers wide open. However, timing the play is difficult, and with two lateral passes and a forward throw, the chances for error are great. A failure leaves the ball behind the line of scrimmage in what will almost certainly be a loss of yards. The play also requires all passes prior to the final one thrown by the quarterback to be either parallel to the line of scrimmage or backwards, since only one forward pass is allowed per play. Multiple forward passes will result in a penalty.

== Common trick plays ==
Common trick plays attempt to place the defense out of position by starting action in one direction, then completing it in another. They often appear to be a conventional play at first. There is no real "trick" being played in terms of deception, the defense simply reacts without considering the possibility of the ball carrier changing mid-play. Some of these plays are so common as to not be recognized as trick plays, instead being a regular part of the American football playbook.

End arounds
In an end-around play, a wide receiver or split end runs laterally behind the line of scrimmage, takes a handoff from the quarterback, and continues around the opposite end of the line. As a regular part of the playbook, an end-around with a proper lead blocker such as an H-back or fullback can get positive yardage without relying on trickery. Because the defense normally expects the wide receivers to run a downfield pass pattern, an end-around that catches the defenders by surprise can result in a big gain.

Reverse
A similar trick play is a reverse, which often begins as an end-around. In a reverse, a ball-carrier running parallel to the line of scrimmage in one direction hands off to a teammate coming in the opposite direction. This abruptly reverses the lateral flow of the play; if the defense is slow to react, the second ball-carrier might make it around the end of the line to a near-open field. Variations of the basic reverse include the double reverse (which involves a second flow-reversing handoff), exceedingly rare triple reverses involving even more handoffs, the fake reverse described below, and the reverse flea flicker.

Double pass
A double pass is a play in which the quarterback throws a backwards pass to another player, who then looks to throw a forward pass. (Football rules limit an offense to one forward pass on any given play. No such restriction exists with lateral passes.) This play was used famously in a 2015 NFL Divisional playoff game between the New England Patriots and the Baltimore Ravens when Julian Edelman threw a 51-yard touchdown pass in the 3rd quarter. Because an incomplete lateral is a fumble, double passes are widely considered one of the riskiest plays in football.

Halfback pass
(See also Halfback option play.) In this play the quarterback pitches the ball to a halfback as if it were an outside run, but instead of running up the field the halfback looks for an open receiver to pass the ball to. Teams that have a player who is both a skilled runner and passer use this play more often. NFL Hall of Famers Walter Payton and LaDainian Tomlinson are notable examples, each having scored multiple rushing, passing and receiving touchdowns during their careers.

Wide receiver pass / fake reverse
Similar to the halfback pass, the ball is given to a wide receiver on an end around or reverse, but instead of turning upfield he looks for a passing target (which in some situations might include the quarterback, who has run a pass pattern after the handoff.) Like the halfback pass, this play often utilizes a multi-skilled player; Antwaan Randle El is a wide receiver who played quarterback in college and is known for his ability to pass, throwing a 43-yard touchdown pass to Hines Ward, another wide receiver who also played as a quarterback in college, during Super Bowl XL.

Flea Flicker
In a conventional Flea Flicker, the ball is handed or tossed to a player to begin what appears to be a typical rush. The rusher pitches it back to the quarterback just before crossing the line of scrimmage. The quarterback can then attempt a conventional pass play. Other versions of this play are the reverse flea flicker and the double pass flea flicker.

Reverse Flea Flicker
As the name implies, this is a combination of a reverse and a flea flicker. After one or more reverse handoffs, the ball is lateraled back to the quarterback, who looks for an open receiver downfield. As with all flea-flickers, the play is designed to trick the defensive backs into coming upfield prematurely to defend what they believe to be a rushing play. A variant is to have one of the recipients of the handoffs throw the ball himself; if the passer runs in an arc deep enough into the backfield and the reverse forestalls the pass rush, it provides plenty of time for the passer to make a proper read, unlike the normal flea flicker.

Throwback Flea Flicker
Also known as a throwback double pass, this is a combination of a double pass play and a flea flicker. A typical fleaflicker involves a handoff to a running back who then underhand pitches the ball back to the quarterback, but in this version, the running back gets outside and throws a backward pass to the quarterback, who then throws a forward pass. As with all flea flickers, it’s designed to get the defense into their run fit, but in this version, the defense is drawn to the outside, where the ball is thrown to the other side.

Dual quarterbacks

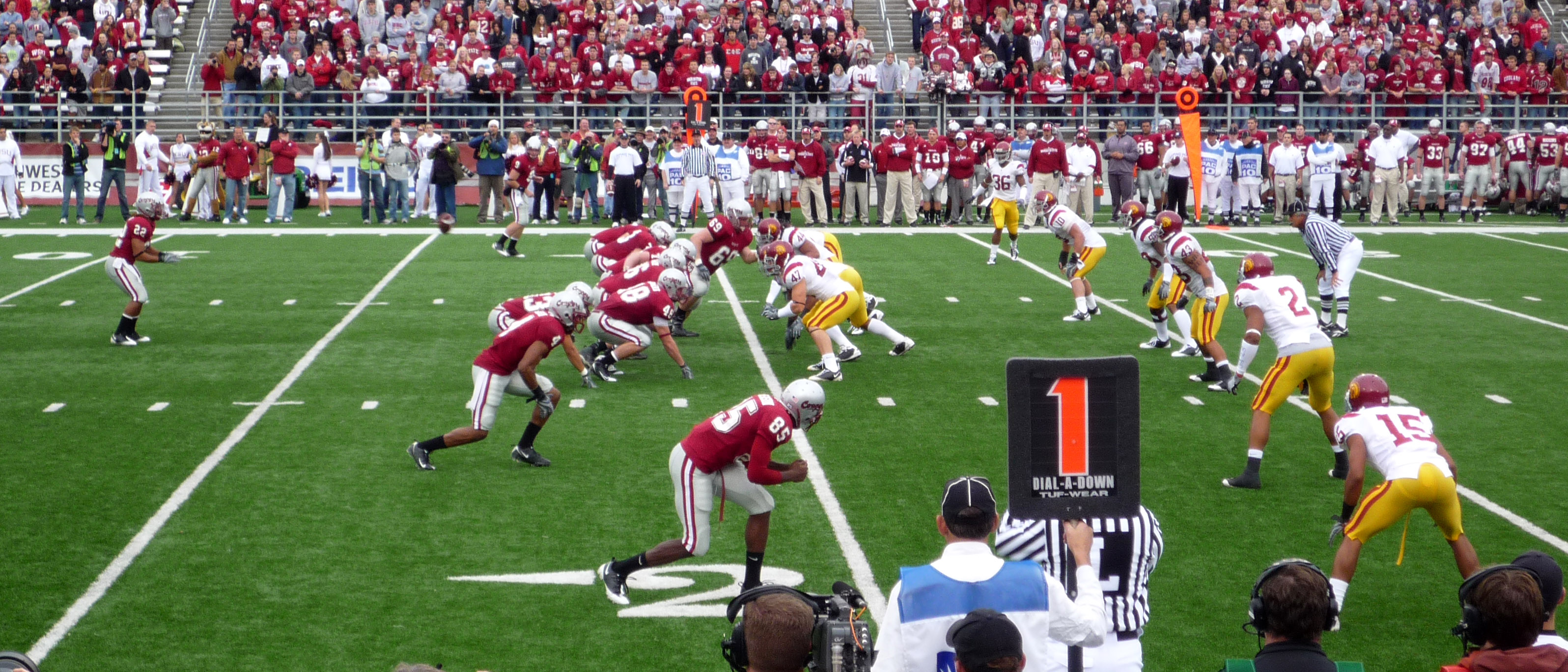
The offense (left) run a "halfback direct snap": In this case, before the play the quarterback (#9) has gone to the far side of the field (lining up as a receiver), while the ball is being snapped directly to a running back (#22).

The offense brings two quarterbacks onto the field for a play. This is typically utilized when a team's second or third-string quarterback has dual-threat ability, confusing the defense as to how the play will develop, and who will be passing the ball. Teams may keep one of the quarterbacks far wide as a receiver and throw a screen pass to him on a Double Pass play, where he then throws deep downfield or across the field to the scrambling quarterback. An early use of two quarterbacks was pioneered by the San Francisco 49ers, who in the late 1950s had certain sets where both Y. A. Tittle and John Brodie were on the field at the same time. Seneca Wallace and Matt Hasselbeck were used in this package by the Seattle Seahawks in 2009. In Week 8 of the 2008 season, the Baltimore Ravens lined up Troy Smith at halfback next to Joe Flacco in the shotgun. Flacco handed the ball off to Smith, who rolled to the right, and then lobbed the pass back down the sideline to a sprinting Flacco for a gain of 43 yards. A variant of this is to send two quarterbacks onto the field, then place one in a wide-receiver position near the sideline nearest the team bench to make it appear as if the second quarterback is coming off the field. In Week 3 of the 2014 season, the Cleveland Browns executed a version of the play where they switched out quarterback Johnny Manziel for Brian Hoyer. Manziel walked over to the sideline, appearing as if he was talking with offensive coordinator Kyle Shanahan. However, Manziel was lined up on the field, off the line of scrimmage. Hoyer snapped the ball, which prompted Shanahan to signal Manziel to run his route. The pass was completed for a 47 yard gain to a wide open Manziel, but was called back for an illegal shift by running back Terrance West. The use of dual quarterbacks in this manner has unusual statistical side effects; the 2015 NFL season saw Matt Cassel officially considered the Buffalo Bills' opening day starting quarterback because their first offensive play was a two-quarterback trick play with usual starter Tyrod Taylor as wide receiver. Cassel never played another down for the Bills.

Hook and lateral
Also known as a "hook and ladder", the hook and lateral play involves a lateral pass after a completed forward pass. The most common variant of this play involves a receiver who runs a curl pattern, catches a short pass, then immediately laterals the ball to another receiver running a crossing route. Sometimes known as a "circus". The Miami Dolphins ran this play against the San Diego Chargers in the 1981 AFC playoffs. On the last play of the first half, quarterback Don Strock threw a short pass to wide receiver Duriel Harris, who had gone downfield a few steps ahead of running back Tony Nathan. As Harris caught the ball, he stopped, facing back upfield, and then lateraled to Nathan as he ran by. Nathan took the lateral and ran 23 yards for a touchdown.

Statue of Liberty

The "Statue of Liberty play", named for its resemblance to the Statue of Liberty, starts with a snap to the quarterback, who falls back, preparing for a pass. Normally the snap is caught in two hands, and then the ball is moved to the throwing hand (typically right) while the non-throwing arm moves lower. In this trick, the quarterback carries out the same motions, but moves the ball to the non-throwing hand. When he fakes the pass, the non-throwing arm is moved behind his back, hiding the ball. One of the backs, running in the direction opposite the fake pass, takes the ball and starts a rush. Like the reverse, the goal is to catch the defense on the wrong side of the line, and can be a high-value play when executed successfully. However, the movements and timing required are difficult and can easily lead to blown plays.

Fumblerooski

In the fumblerooski, the quarterback takes the snap and immediately places the ball, unseen by the defense, on the ground. This is technically a fumble, and thus the name of the play. The quarterback then moves away from the ball, faking a pass or setting up for a fake hand-off to one side of the line. Meanwhile, one of the backs picks up the ball and starts a rush in the opposite direction. In general terms the play is very similar to the Statue of Liberty, although it gives the quarterback more room for motion. There is some dispute as to whether the fumblerooski is legal.

Bouncerooski

After taking the snap, the quarterback drops back slightly and pretends to pass to one of the receivers near the line of scrimmage. However, he deliberately passes short, so the ball bounces off the ground near the intended receiver. The receiver then catches the ball nonchalantly as it bounces up again. If the ball had moved forward, hitting the ground would trigger the end of the play as an incomplete pass. However, this is not the case for a lateral pass, where the bounce is technically a fumble, and play continues.

Key to the bounce rooski is that everyone on the offensive team has to pretend that it is an incomplete pass. This typically happens with the receiver never starting motion, all of the offensive players stopping and leisurely returning to their places on the line, and everyone basically relaxing. If the fake is successful, when the defense does the same, the receiver can run off unopposed, or, as it was a lateral pass, make a forward pass after the receivers have had ample time to move far down the field.

The trick only works if the offensive team "plays it" well, none of the defenders notices exactly where the ball hit the ground, and the defense stops at the sight of the ball hitting the ground instead of playing until they hear the official's whistle (as most coaches teach). In the event the defense notices the fakery, they can simply grab the ball from the stationary receiver, making this a dangerous ploy. Although the name implies great similarities with the fumblerooski, the two are very different in terms of on-field action. The play is also dangerous for the receiver since the trajectory of the football's "bounce" is unpredictable due to the oblong shape of the ball. A football thrown in one direction may bounce off the ground in a completely different one.

One of the famed examples of the bouncerooski was Nebraska vs Oklahoma in 1982, although it didn't fool the defenders, it was still executed well enough that the wide receiver who took the backward bouncing pass was still able to complete the trick play with a wide receiver pass to a team-mate for a significant gain.

Fake procedure

Going by a variety of names, this trick, a variant of the dual-quarterback scenario listed above, involves the quarterback getting up and walking away from his position behind the center before the snap, apparently in order to hear the call from the coach or to call a timeout.

However, as one player is allowed to be in motion before the snap, play is not technically stopped. If the defense relaxes, believing the quarterback is about to walk to the sidelines, the ball can be snapped to one of the other players and played against a defense that is unprepared. If the defense is not fooled, the quarterback can simply complete the fake task, and return to the center to call the snap.

The Indianapolis Colts, New Orleans Saints, Pittsburgh Steelers, and St. Louis Rams have used variations of this play in the NFL, and it was also used in the movie The Longest Yard (2005) for a winning two-point conversion. Under some state high school rules, if the quarterback or coaches on the sideline say anything that may lead the defense to believe that a snap is not imminent, then the play is an illegal unfair act.

Fake spike

When the clock is running low, it is not uncommon for a quarterback to spike the ball to stop the clock, either to set up for the next play or bring on the special teams. Here too, the objective is to trick the defense into believing that no downfield play will be run—but not fool the officials into thinking the same, which can also ruin the play.

A famous example occurred in 1994 with the Clock Play, when Dan Marino's Dolphins were playing the Jets. From the account of Pat Kirwan, former Jets defensive coach and executive,

With little time left, Marino had driven the Dolphins near our goal line and lined up as if he were going to spike the ball to stop the clock. But instead, he faked the spike, and as our defense let up for a split second, Marino threw the winning touchdown.

Another famous example occurred in 2013 during a Week 8 game between the Dallas Cowboys and the Detroit Lions. With a minute left in regulation, Lions quarterback Matthew Stafford drove 80 yards downfield, including a 22-yard pass to Calvin Johnson that stopped 1 yard short of the goal line with 33 seconds left with the Lions out of timeouts. Stafford then jumped over his lineman for the game-winning touchdown.

Peyton Manning was also a frequent user of the fake spike, and "sold it" so well in a 2001 game against New Orleans that the referee Jeff Triplette blew the whistle to stop the play, costing the Colts a probable touchdown.

Tackle-eligible

A tackle-eligible play involves placing an offensive tackle in the position of a tight end. Because of numbering restrictions, the offensive team must report the positioning to the official, who announces to everyone that the ineligible-numbered player is an eligible receiver, reducing the element of surprise. (The exact mechanism of the tackle-eligible play varies by league; college football and Canadian football, for example, require a lineman to physically change his jersey to become eligible.) Often, the trickery involves an unbalanced offensive line, such that there are two players (including the tackle-eligible) on one side of the center and four on the other, making it appear that the tackle-eligible is in a normal position.

Famous tackle-eligible plays include a play in the January 2015 Cotton Bowl Classic involving LaQuan McGowan, a 410-pound offensive lineman who changed jerseys to run a tackle-eligible play; and Jumbo Elliott's touchdown-scoring play in the Monday Night Miracle.

== Special teams trick plays ==
Fake punt

This play can take a number of different forms. Usually the punter will simply take the snap and look to throw a pass or run with the ball after the defenders have turned downfield to block for the punt return. In another variation, the ball may be snapped directly to an upback who then runs downfield or throws.

Fake field goal

As with a fake punt, there are a number of different forms for a fake field goal. Usually the holder (often the punter or backup quarterback on most teams) will throw or run as with the fake punt. Danny White was both quarterback and punter for the Dallas Cowboys in the 1980s and often executed this play. Less frequently, the placekicker, who virtually never handles the ball in an American football game, will serve as the passer or rusher on a fake field goal. Examples include then-New England kicker Adam Vinatieri receiving a direct snap and throwing a touchdown pass during an NFL game in 2004, and LSU kicker Colt David rushing for a 15-yard touchdown in 2007 after receiving the ball on a blind lateral from holder (and starting QB) Matt Flynn. The Seattle Seahawks also used this trick play in the 2014 NFC Championship against the Green Bay Packers. The play resulted in a touchdown (to eligible rookie offensive lineman Garry Gilliam from holder Jon Ryan) and helped Seattle recover from a 16–point deficit en route to a Super Bowl XLIX appearance.

Surprise onside kick

An onside kick, in general, is a kickoff attempt that is positioned in a way that is intended for the kicking team to recover, retaining possession of the football. Increasing restrictions on the onside kick have made it harder to use; even before these rules were imposed, a successful onside kick when expected was rare. The onside kick is more successful as a trick play, conducted when the receiving team does not expect it and does not have their "hands team" (an assembly of wide receivers and other players adept at recovering loose balls) on the field. The most famous example of a surprise onside kick is when the New Orleans Saints used it on the second half kickoff in Super Bowl XLIV against the Indianapolis Colts, a game the Saints eventually won 31–17.

== Famous trick plays ==
- The Philadelphia Eagles used the Philly Special in Super Bowl LII, which scored them a touchdown on 4th and goal. On the play, running back Corey Clement took a direct snap and flipped it to tight end Trey Burton, who threw a touchdown pass to quarterback Nick Foles running a route to the right side of the end zone.
- In the Music City Miracle, the Tennessee Titans used a kickoff return play containing two designed backward passes, one traveling nearly the width of the field, to defeat the Buffalo Bills in a 2000 NFL wild-card playoff game.
- The Boise State Broncos famously used three trick plays in rapid succession to score fifteen points near the end of the 2007 Fiesta Bowl, pulling off a 43–42 victory over Oklahoma. The three plays were a hook-and-lateral play, which tied the game and forced overtime; a wide receiver option pass run out of the Wildcat set to score in the overtime period; and finally, a Statue of Liberty play on the ensuing two-point conversion attempt to win the game.
- The Nebraska Cornhuskers scored a famous touchdown in the 1984 Orange Bowl against the Miami Hurricanes on a fumblerooski play. After the ball was deliberately left sitting on the field during a fake sweep, Nebraska lineman Dean Steinkuhler surreptitiously picked it up and ran unchallenged towards the endzone before the Hurricanes could react. This play was subsequently banned at most levels of competitive football.

== See also ==
- Flea flicker
- Fumblerooski
- Hidden ball trick
- Statue of Liberty play
- Swinging Gate
