= Griff Whalen =

American football player (born 1990)

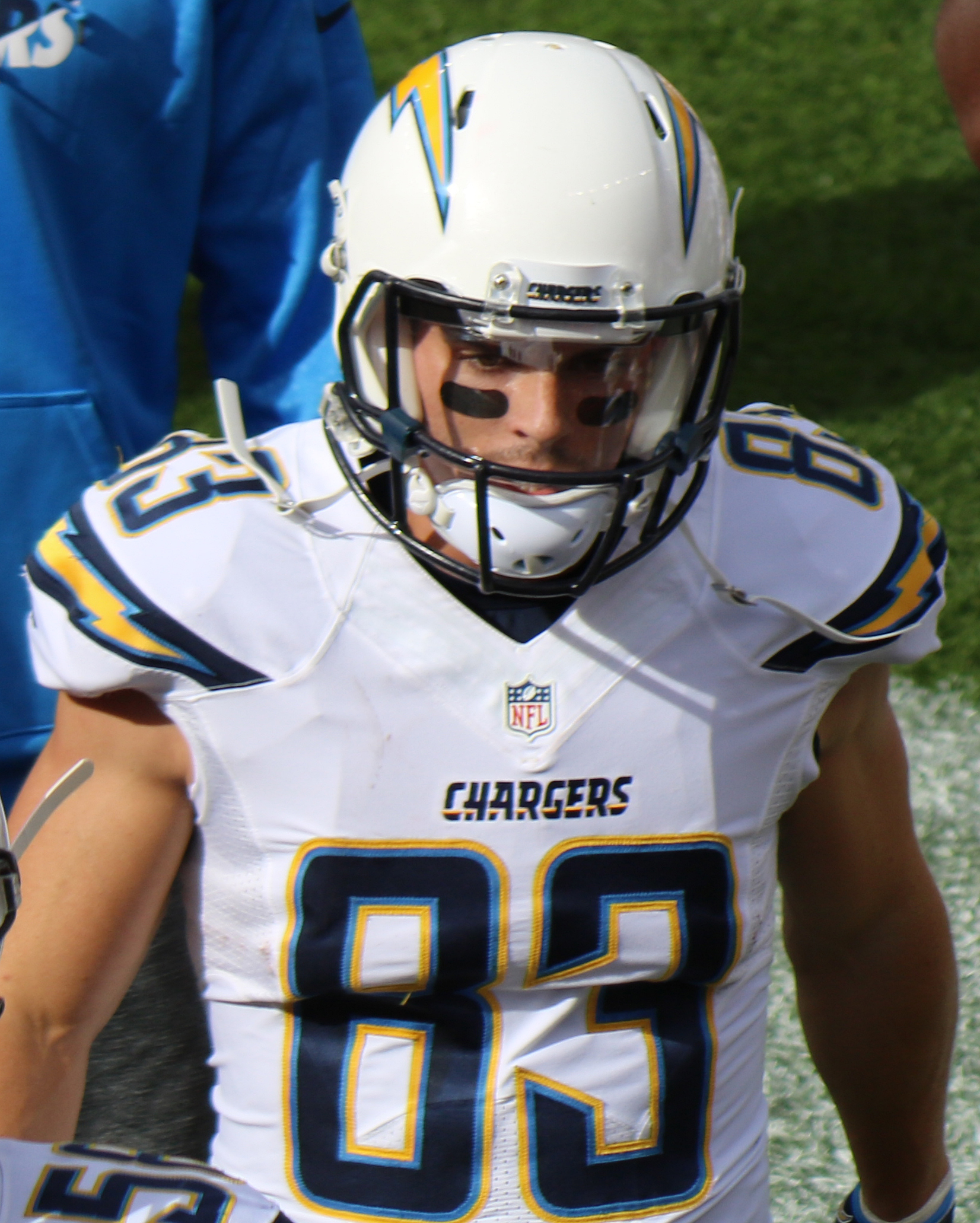
- Whalen with the San Diego Chargers in 2016

No. 14, 17, 83
- Position: Wide receiver

Personal information
- Born: March 1, 1990 (age 36); Detroit, Michigan, U.S.
- Listed height: 5 ft 11 in (1.80 m)
- Listed weight: 190 lb (86 kg)

Career information
- High school: Sylvania Southview (Sylvania, Ohio)
- College: Stanford (2008–2011)
- NFL draft: 2012: undrafted

Career history
- Indianapolis Colts (2012–2015); Miami Dolphins (2016)*; San Diego Chargers (2016); New England Patriots (2016); Baltimore Ravens (2017); Oakland Raiders (2018)*; Calgary Stampeders (2019)*
- * Offseason or practice squad member only

Career NFL statistics
- Receptions: 51
- Receiving yards: 532
- Receiving touchdowns: 3
- Stats at Pro Football Reference

Griff Whalen (born March 1, 1990) is an American former professional football player who was a wide receiver in the National Football League (NFL). He played college football for the Stanford Cardinal and was signed by the Indianapolis Colts as an undrafted free agent in 2012. Whalen was also a member of the Miami Dolphins, San Diego Chargers, New England Patriots, Baltimore Ravens, and Oakland Raiders, as well as for the Calgary Stampeders of the Canadian Football League (CFL).

== College career ==
Whalen played for the Stanford Cardinal from 2008–2011. He was roommates with quarterback Andrew Luck for three years. While at Stanford University, he played on the club lacrosse team in one season.

=== 2008 season ===
Whalen made the Stanford football team as a walk-on and was one of eight true freshmen to see playing time in the 2008 season. He appeared in the Washington State game, earning a varsity letter. In the game, he had two punt returns for 12 yards.

=== 2009 season ===
In 2009, Whalen worked his way into the wide receiver rotation. He appeared in 12 games and made two starts (Oregon and USC). His first career reception was in the season opener against Washington State. For the season, Whalen caught seven passes for 60 yards (8.6 average).

=== 2010 season ===
In 2010, Whalen caught 17 passes for 249 yards and one touchdown in 13 games (one start). He caught one pass for 19 yards against UCLA before catching 11 passes for 154 yards and one touchdown in the next three games against Wake Forest (3 for 39), Notre Dame (3 for 37), and Oregon (5 for 78). He provided much-needed depth to the receiving corps in the early going, when Ryan Whalen and Chris Owusu were slowed with injuries. He caught a career-high five passes for 78 yards at Oregon, including his first career touchdown at the 5:06 mark of the first quarter on an 18-yard corner route from quarterback Andrew Luck.

=== 2011 season ===
The 2011 season was Whalen's best statistical year at Stanford. He finished the 2011 season with 56 receptions for 749 yards and 4 touchdowns. His best statistical game came in a loss to Oregon. He finished with 9 receptions for 107 yards and 2 touchdowns. During the Fiesta Bowl against Oklahoma State, he had 7 receptions for 85 yards. Stanford lost 38–41. He was a finalist for the Burlsworth Trophy, which is an award given annually to the most outstanding FBS college football player who began his career as a walk-on.

== Professional career ==
Pre-draft measurables
Height	Weight	40-yard dash	10-yard split	20-yard split	20-yard shuttle	Three-cone drill	Vertical jump	Broad jump	Bench press
5 ft 10 1/2 in (1.79 m)	185 lb (84 kg)	4.55 s	1.56 s	2.62 s	4.06 s	6.89 s	36.5 in (0.93 m)	9 ft 2 in (2.79 m)	15 reps
All values from Pro Day

=== Indianapolis Colts ===
==== 2012 ====
Whalen was signed by the Indianapolis Colts as an undrafted free agent following the 2012 NFL draft on April 28, 2012, joining fellow Stanford players Andrew Luck and Coby Fleener. On August 28, he was put on the injured reserve list for a broken foot, which occurred against the Pittsburgh Steelers.

==== 2013 ====
More hurdles were thrown Whalen’s way in 2013. His position on the active roster at the beginning of the season was due to second year wide-out LaVon Brazill's four-game suspension due to a violation of the league’s substance abuse policy. Whalen was cut following Brazill’s return, but was quickly signed to the practice squad after impressing the Colts’ coaching staff. He was activated once again after Reggie Wayne’s season-ending ACL injury during the Week 7 victory over the Denver Broncos.

Following a second spell on the practice squad, Whalen returned to the active roster in Week 15 against the Houston Texans and started to offer a glimpse of the potential at his disposal. A career-high 45 receiving yards and first touchdown catch against the Texans was followed by an 80-yard day in the impressive 23–7 road victory over the Kansas City Chiefs, a game in which Whalen led the Colts in receiving yards and receptions. His fine run of form continued in the 30–10 victory over the Jacksonville Jaguars in Week 17, adding a second touchdown catch in three weeks.

Whalen made his playoff debut against the Kansas City Chiefs in the Wild Card Round on January 4, 2014. In the 45–44 victory, he had two receptions for 26 yards. In the Divisional Round against the New England Patriots, he had five receptions for 67 yards in the 43–22 loss.

Overall, Whalen ended the year as a starter with 24 receptions for 259 yards and two touchdowns.

==== 2014 ====
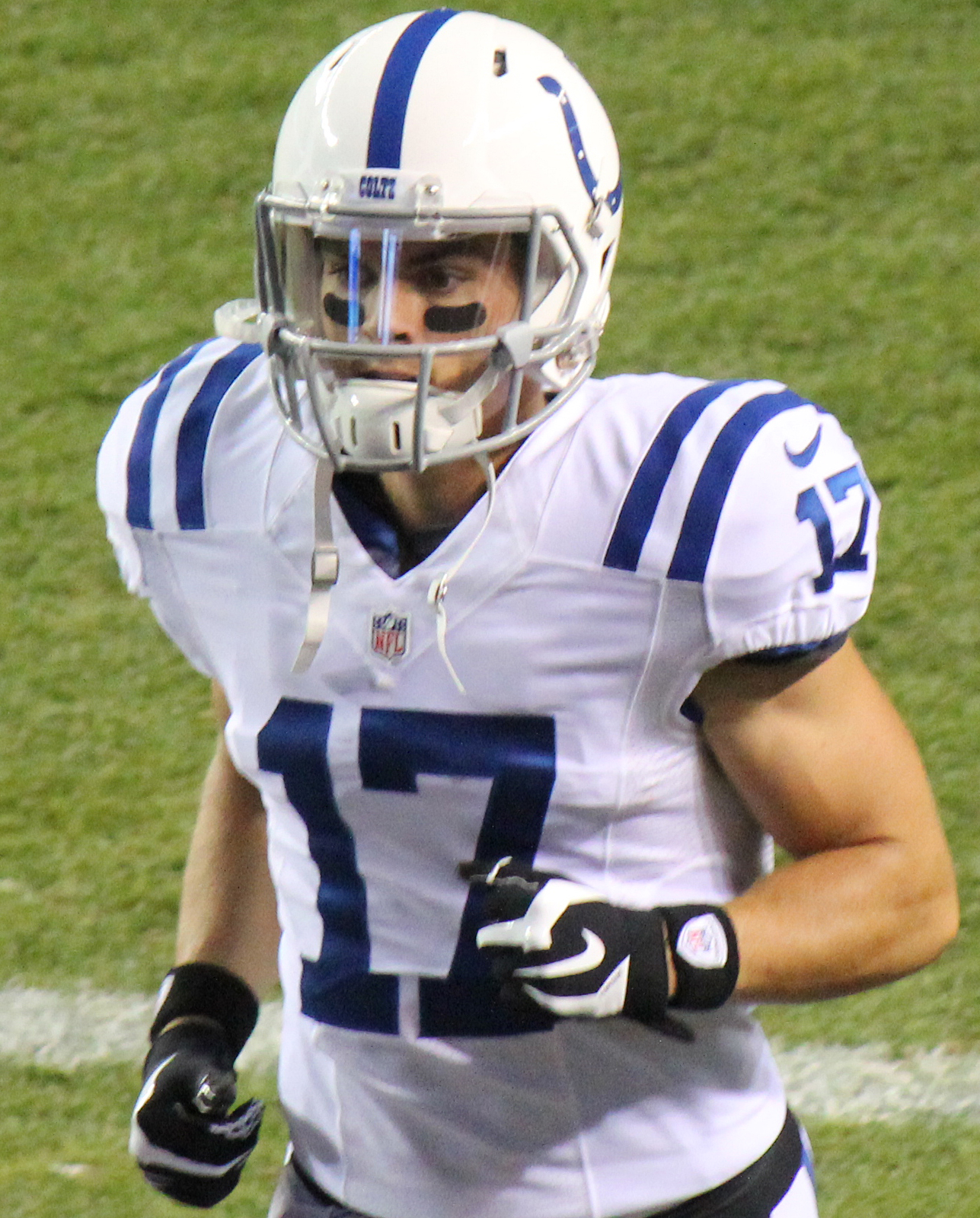
Whalen with the Colts in 2014

On November 22, 2014, the Colts promoted running back Zurlon Tipton to the active roster and waived Whalen. Up to that point, he had been used mostly as a kickoff and punt returner, and made just 2 receptions for 23 yards. On November 25 Whalen was signed to the practice squad by the Colts. On January 15, 2015, Whalen was promoted to the active roster when Josh McNary was placed on the Commissioner's Exempt list.

==== 2015 ====
On October 18, 2015, against the New England Patriots, Indianapolis coach Chuck Pagano called for a trick play on 4th and 3 late in the third quarter with the Colts trailing 27–21. The play left Whalen accidentally snapping the ball to Colt Anderson with no Colts teammates blocking and two Patriots players standing over the ball. The play was stopped for a loss, the Patriots took over on downs and scored a touchdown en route to a 34–27 victory. The play was questioned by numerous NFL experts and players from around the league. In the game, he did score his first touchdown since the 2013 season with a late score to pull within a touchdown of the Patriots. Just a week later, Whalen was part of a second disastrous special teams play, when he fumbled on a kick return which led to a touchdown in a game against the New Orleans Saints. Whalen redeemed himself the following week against the Carolina Panthers by catching all five of his targets that came in the fourth quarter, helping send the game into overtime. Against the Denver Broncos, Whalen had 5 receptions for 73 yards, and was a crucial part to the Colts beating the then-undefeated Broncos. On December 21, 2015, Whalen was placed on season-ending injured reserve. On January 1, 2016, Whalen was waived by the Colts.

=== Miami Dolphins ===
On March 18, 2016, Whalen signed with the Miami Dolphins, but was waived on September 4, during final roster cuts.

=== San Diego Chargers ===
On September 19, 2016, Whalen signed with the San Diego Chargers. In his time with the Chargers, he recorded only two receptions for 22 yards in eight games. Whalen was released by the Chargers on November 22.

=== New England Patriots ===
On December 9, 2016, Whalen was signed by the New England Patriots. He was released by the Patriots on December 15.

=== Baltimore Ravens ===
On July 21, 2017, Whalen signed with the Baltimore Ravens. On September 1, he was released by the Ravens during final roster cuts. Whalen was re-signed by the Ravens on October 19. He made his Ravens debut in Week 7 with four receptions for 23 yards against the Minnesota Vikings. In the next game, against the Miami Dolphins, he recorded a single punt return for two yards. He was released on October 31.

=== Oakland Raiders ===
On March 12, 2018, Whalen signed with the Oakland Raiders. He was placed on injured reserve on August 27, and was released with an injury settlement the next day.

=== Calgary Stampeders ===
Whalen signed with the Calgary Stampeders of the CFL on May 14, 2019. Despite catching three passes for 73 yards and a score during the preseason, and having a family connection to Calgary, Whalen was released.

== Career statistics ==
=== NFL ===
==== Regular season ====
Year	Team	Games		Receiving					Fumbles	
Year	Team	GP	GS	Rec	Yds	Avg	Lng	TD	Fum	Lost
2013	IND	9	3	24	259	10.8	25	2	0	0
2014	IND	10	0	2	23	11.5	18	0	2	1
2015	IND	14	0	19	205	10.8	38	1	4	2
2016	SD	8	0	2	22	11.0	12	0	0	0
2017	BAL	2	0	4	23	5.8	9	0	0	0
Total		43	3	51	532	10.4	38	3	6	3

==== Postseason ====
Year	Team	Games		Receiving					Fumbles	
Year	Team	GP	GS	Rec	Yds	Avg	Lng	TD	Fum	Lost
2013	IND	2	1	7	93	13.3	22	0	0	0
Total		2	1	7	93	13.3	22	0	0	0

=== College ===
Season	Team	GP	Receiving				
Season	Team	GP	Rec	Yds	Avg	Lng	TD
2008	Stanford	1	0	0	0.0	0	0
2009	Stanford	12	7	60	8.6	24	0
2010	Stanford	13	17	249	14.6	27	1
2011	Stanford	13	56	749	13.4	32	4
Total		39	80	1,058	13.2	32	5

== Personal life ==
Whalen has been a vegan since 2013.
