= Hash mark (sports) =

Distance marker in ice hockey and gridiron football

In sports, a hash mark or hash line is a short line/bar marking that is painted perpendicular to the sidelines or side barricades, used to help referees and players recognize on-field locations and visually measure distances. Hash marks serve the same function as the graduated markings on measuring tools such as rulers.

== Usage in ice hockey ==
Typical layout of an ice hockey rink surface

In ice hockey, the hash marks are two pairs of parallel lines on either side of the face-off circles in both ends of the rink. Players must remain on their team's side of the hash mark nearest their own goal during a face-off until the puck hits the ice.

== Usage in gridiron football ==
Hash marks

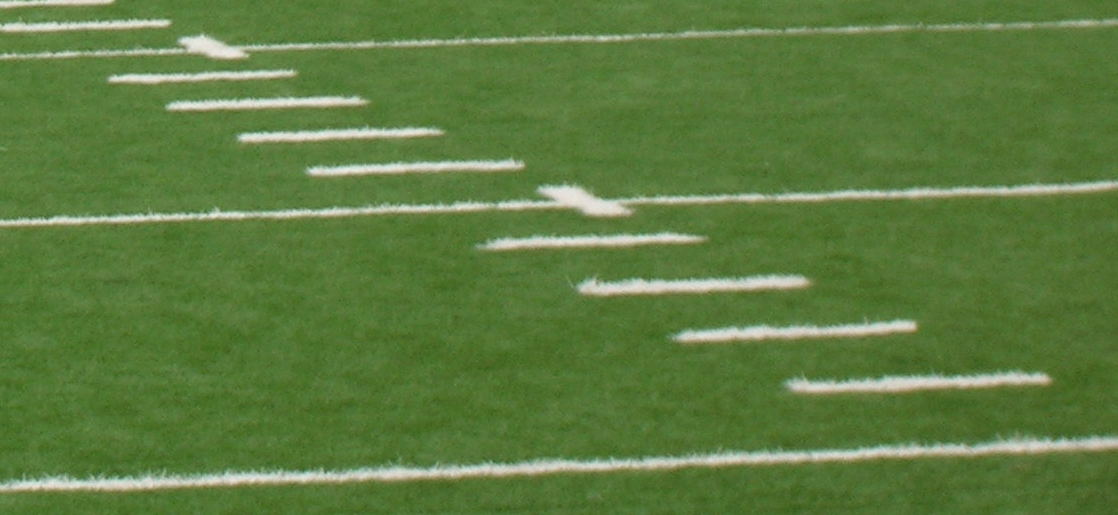
...at Dix Stadium (above)

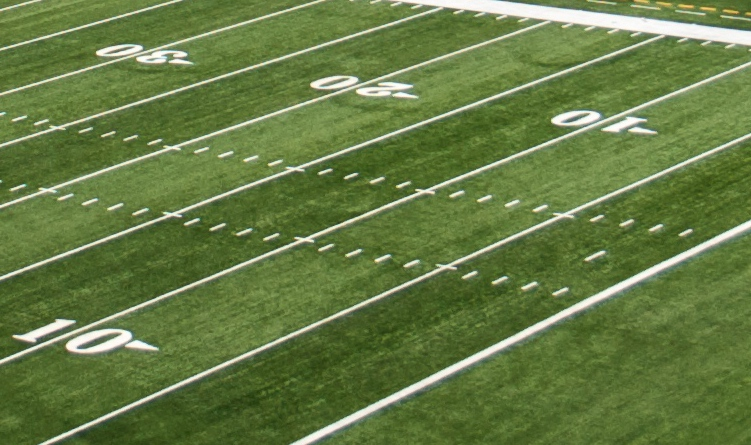
...at MetLife Stadium

In American football and Canadian football, the hash marks are two rows of lines near the middle of the field that are parallel to the side lines. These small lines (4 in [10 cm] wide by 2 ft [61 cm] long) are used to mark the 1-yard sections between each of the 5-yard lines, which go from sideline to sideline. All plays start with the ball on or between the hash marks. That is, if the ball is downed in between a hash mark and the nearest sideline, it must be placed on that hash mark for the next play.

Prior to the adoption of hash marks (which were first utilized at the first NFL playoff game in 1932), all plays began where the ball was declared dead, including extra point attempts.

The hashmarks in that indoor 1932 playoff game were originally 30 feet (9.1 m) from the sideline, and that width was adopted by the NFL for the 1933 season. It was increased to 45 feet (14 m) from the sideline (70 ft [21 m] apart) in 1935, 60 feet (18 m) from the sideline (40 ft [12 m] apart) in 1945, and to the current 70 feet 9 inches (21.56 m) from the sideline (18 1/2 ft [5.6 m] apart) in 1972.

In most forms of professional football in the U.S., including the National Football League and most forms of indoor football, the hash marks are in line with the goal posts, both being 18 feet 6 inches apart in the NFL and between 9 and 10 feet (2.7 and 3.0 m) in indoor football. High school football, college football and Canadian football have hash marks significantly wider than the goal posts. The college football standard, which was the previous standard in the NFL (1945–1971), is 40 feet apart, (20 yards from the sidelines) introduced in 1993. Previously, the college width was the same as the high school standard (with the exception of Texas, which currently uses the current college width), at one-third of the width of the field (53 1/3 feet [16.3 m]).

The Canadian standard for amateur play is 51 feet (16 m) in width, 24 yards from each sideline. The Canadian Football League formerly used this spacing, but narrowed the hash mark spacing to 9 yards (8.2 m) in 2022. A Canadian football field width is 65 yards (195 ft; 59 m), 35 feet (11 m) wider than in the American game.

== See also ==
- Hash House Harriers § Trail markings
