= Colt Anderson =

American football player and coach (born 1985)

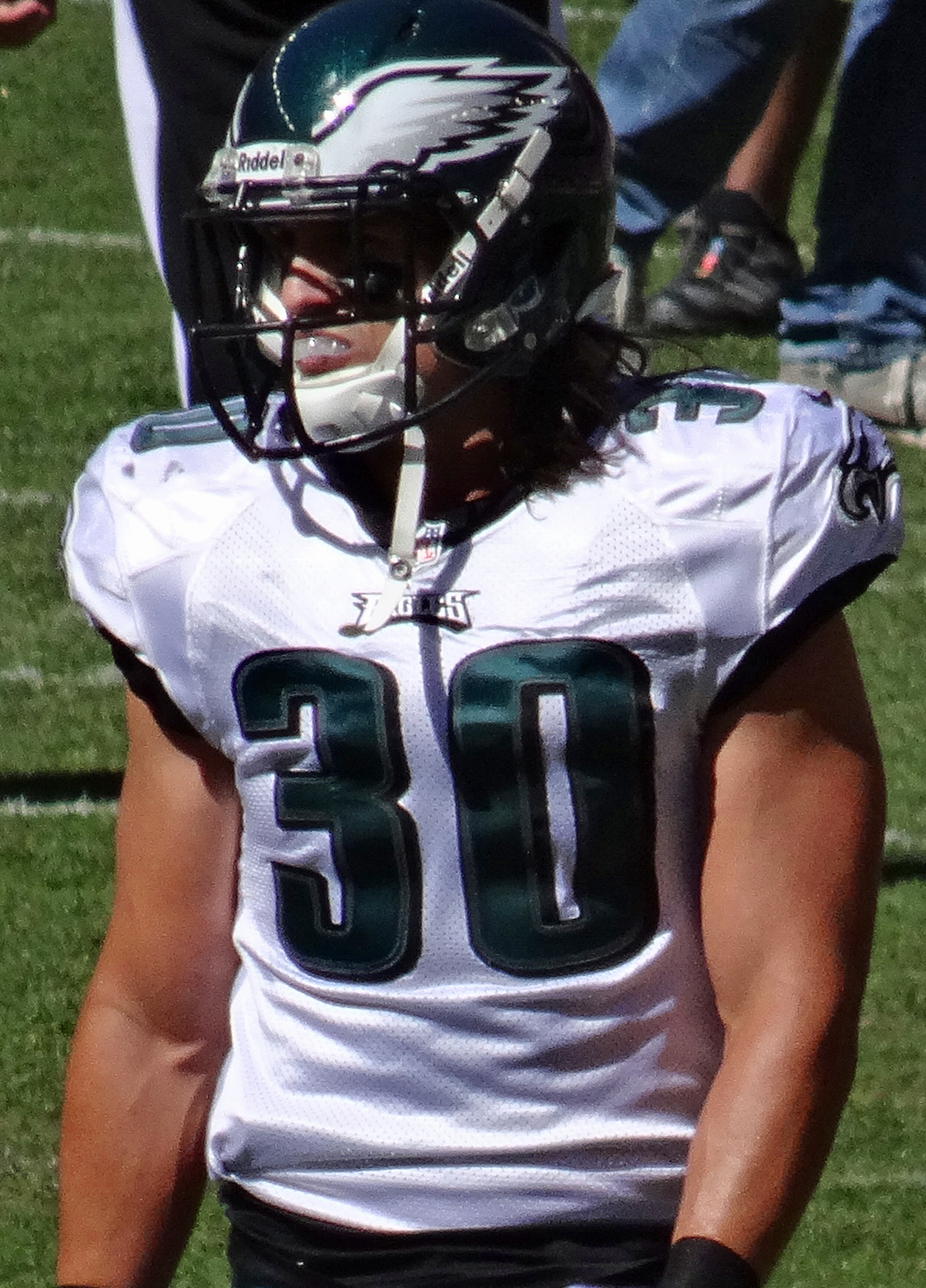
- Anderson with the Philadelphia Eagles in 2013

San Francisco 49ers
- Title: Assistant special teams coach

Personal information
- Born: October 25, 1985 (age 41); Butte, Montana, U.S.
- Listed height: 5 ft 10 in (1.78 m)
- Listed weight: 195 lb (88 kg)

Career information
- Position: Safety (No. 30, 32, 33)
- High school: Butte
- College: Montana
- NFL draft: 2009: undrafted

Career history

Playing
- Minnesota Vikings (2009–2010)*; Philadelphia Eagles (2010–2013); Indianapolis Colts (2014–2015); Buffalo Bills (2016–2017)
- * Offseason or practice squad member only

Coaching
- Cincinnati Bengals (2020–2023) Assistant special teams coach; Tennessee Titans (2024) Special teams coordinator; San Francisco 49ers (2025–present) Assistant special teams coach

Awards and highlights
- 3× First-team All-Big Sky honors (2006–2008); College Sporting News "Fabulous Fifty" honors (2007); First-team All-America honors (AFCA, AP, CSN, WCF) (2008)

Career NFL statistics
- Total tackles: 109
- Forced fumbles: 4
- Fumble recoveries: 1
- Pass deflections: 4
- Interceptions: 1
- Stats at Pro Football Reference

Colt Anderson (born October 25, 1985) is an American professional football coach and former player who currently serves as the assistant special teams coach for the San Francisco 49ers of the National Football League (NFL). He played in the NFL as a safety and special teams gunner. Anderson played college football for the Montana Grizzlies and was signed by the Minnesota Vikings as an undrafted free agent in 2009. He was also a member of the Philadelphia Eagles, Indianapolis Colts, and Buffalo Bills.

== Early life ==
Anderson was born on October 25, 1985, in Butte, Montana, to parents Mike and Michele Anderson. He has three uncles that played college football between the University of Montana and Montana State University during the 1970s. Anderson attended Butte High School, where he lettered in football and basketball for three years, and track for two years. Anderson played football as a running back and safety. As a junior, he was named honorable mention all-state, and as a senior in 2004, was an all-state first-team safety and honorable mention running back. The Butte High Bulldogs had an imperfect season with a record of 0–9 in Anderson's senior season. Over the course of his career, Anderson recorded 310 tackles, nine interceptions, 850 rushing yards, and 12 touchdowns. He was not recruited out of high school and chose to attend the University of Montana.

== College career ==
Anderson attended the University of Montana, where he studied business administration. Anderson walked onto the team, and sat out the 2004 season on redshirt status.

In 2005, Anderson saw action in five games on special teams, but suffered a broken thumb after making a tackle against Oregon. His injury curtailed his playing time, and Anderson finished the season having recorded seven tackles. During the offseason, he worked to improve his conditioning and impressed the coaching staff enough to garner a scholarship.

In 2006, Anderson started all 14 games and recorded 92 tackles. The conference named him to the All-Big Sky first-team as both a safety and on special teams. When asked if he looks for "big-hit opportunit[ies]", Anderson said, "I just like to fly around and make plays and every now and then you’ll come across a guy that you can hit."

In 2007, Anderson started in all 14 games, tallying 85 tackles including 58 solo and seven for loss, three forced fumbles, four interceptions, and nine pass deflections. The conference again named him to the All-Big Sky first team, while The Sports Network named Anderson an honorable mention All-American, and College Sporting News named him to its "Fabulous Fifty" team.

In 2008, Anderson served as the team captain and saw action in all 16 games. He recorded 129 tackles including 63 solo and 6.5 for loss, one quarterback sack, three interceptions returned for 80 yards, six passes broken-up, one forced fumble, and two fumble recoveries. That season, Montana advanced to the national championship game before falling to Richmond, 24–7. Anderson was selected as a Buck Buchanan Award candidate. The conference named him an All-Big Sky player for the third year and he also received the team's most valuable player honors. Virtually every FCS All-America team selector named Anderson to its first team. The American Football Coaches Association, Associated Press, College Sporting News, and the Walter Camp Foundation named Anderson to their first teams, while the Sports Network named him an honorable mention All-American. After the season, he participated in the Texas vs. the Nation all-star game.

== Professional career ==
=== Pre-draft ===
Pre-draft measurables
Height	Weight	40-yard dash	10-yard split	20-yard split	20-yard shuttle	Three-cone drill	Vertical jump	Broad jump	Bench press
5 ft 9 1/2 in (1.77 m)	194 lb (88 kg)	4.53 s	1.53 s	2.62 s	4.19 s	6.85 s	36.5 in (0.93 m)	10 ft 3 in (3.12 m)	15 reps
All values from Pro Day

The CBS Sports-affiliated NFL Draft Scout assessed Anderson as the 13th-ranked of the 106 free safeties available for the 2009 NFL draft and considered him as a potential seventh-round selection or free agent. A Scout.com assessment commended Anderson's instincts and tackling, but described his size as "marginal for the NFL" and said he was more suited for zone coverage than man-to-man. Anderson said, "Shoot, I'm like any other person. I'll watch the first 10 picks, or maybe the first round, and then just check on it from time to time. Any NFL fan will watch that first round. Once the second round starts, I’ll be laying around, taking a nap."

=== Minnesota Vikings ===
Anderson was not selected in the 2009 draft, but he reported that ten teams pursued him shortly afterward. The Minnesota Vikings signed Anderson as an undrafted free agent, which included a $20,000 signing bonus, a comparatively large sum. He said, "I just felt Minnesota was the best opportunity for me. They thought I could have an impact for them."

Anderson spent the majority of his first two seasons on Minnesota’s practice squad.

=== Philadelphia Eagles ===
Anderson was signed to a three-year contract off of the Vikings' practice squad on November 9, 2010, by the Philadelphia Eagles. He played in the Eagles eight remaining games that season, starting two due to injury to Nate Allen.

Anderson was considered a Pro Bowl caliber special teams player in 2011 through the first 12 games of the season, before suffering a torn anterior cruciate ligament (ACL) in a game against the Seattle Seahawks, leading to his placement on injured reserve on December 5.

Anderson was placed on the physically unable to perform list (PUP) for the start of training camp on July 22, 2012. He was once again considered a standout special teams player for an otherwise mostly disappointing Eagles team, earning starts at safety when Kurt Coleman was injured.

Anderson's strong play on special teams continued in 2013, though he saw less snaps on defense than the previous season.

=== Indianapolis Colts ===
Anderson signed with the Indianapolis Colts on April 21, 2014. He was one of the only NFL players ever to have the same first name as his team.

On March 10, 2015, Anderson re-signed with the Colts. On October 18 against the New England Patriots, head coach Chuck Pagano called for a fake punt on 4th and 3 late in the third quarter. The play left Griff Whalen snapping the ball to Anderson with no Colts teammates blocking and two Patriots players standing over the ball. Anderson was tackled for a loss, and the Patriots took over on downs and scored a touchdown en route to a 34–27 victory.

=== Buffalo Bills ===
Anderson signed with the Buffalo Bills on April 12, 2016. On October 10, 2016, he was placed on injured reserve with a hand injury.

On January 27, 2017, Anderson was re-signed by the Bills. He was released on September 4, but was re-signed the next day. He was placed on injured reserve on October 3. He was activated off injured reserve on December 28.

== NFL statistics ==
=== Regular season ===
Year	Team	Games		Tackles				Fumbles			Interceptions					
Year	Team	GP	GS	Comb	Total	Ast	Sack	FF	FR	Yds	Int	Yds	Avg	Lng	TD	PD
2010	PHI	8	2	16	16	0	0.0	0	0	0	0	0	0	0	0	0
2011	PHI	12	0	11	10	1	0.0	1	0	0	1	4	4	4	0	3
2012	PHI	14	4	33	30	3	0.0	1	0	0	0	0	0	0	0	1
2013	PHI	14	0	11	9	2	0.0	1	0	0	0	0	0	0	0	0
2014	IND	15	0	19	16	3	0.0	0	1	0	0	0	0	0	0	0
2015	IND	14	1	12	7	5	0.0	0	0	0	0	0	0	0	0	0
2016	BUF	2	0	0	0	0	0.0	0	0	0	0	0	0	0	0	0
2017	BUF	5	0	0	0	0	0.0	0	0	0	0	0	0	0	0	0
Career		87	7	102	88	14	0.0	2	1	0	1	4	4	4	0	4

== Coaching career ==
=== Cincinnati Bengals ===
Anderson was hired by the Cincinnati Bengals as an assistant special teams coach on February 10, 2020.

=== Tennessee Titans ===
On February 16, 2024, Anderson hired by Tennessee Titans as their special teams coordinator under new head coach Brian Callahan. After a disastrous season, Anderson was fired and replaced by John Fassel.

=== San Francisco 49ers ===
On February 25, 2025, the San Francisco 49ers hired Anderson to serve as the team's assistant special teams coach.
