= Upback =

Blocking back in American football

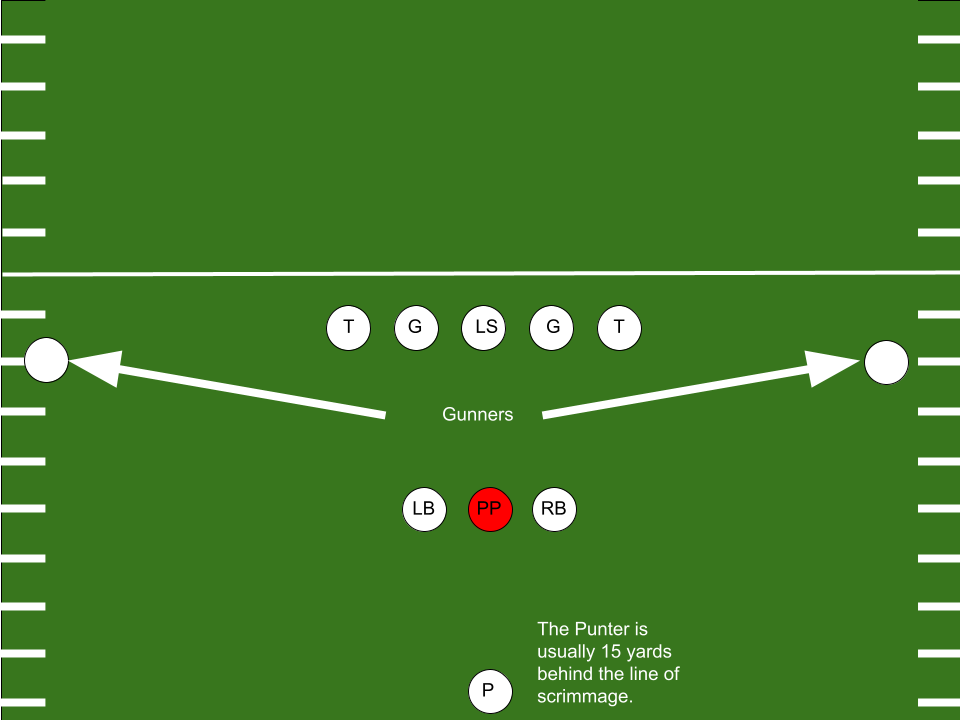
This is a basic punt formation with the upback highlighted in red. The gunners will be on the line of scrimmage with the rest of the offensive line and long snapper.

In American football, the upback (also known as the punt protector or personal protector) is a blocking back who lines up anywhere from 1–7 yards behind the line of scrimmage in punting situations. If there are three blockers behind the main line of scrimmage, the personal protector will line up in the middle of them.

Because the punter plays so far behind the line of scrimmage, the upback frequently makes the line calls and calls for the long snapper to snap the ball to the punter. Their primary role is to act as the last line of defense for the punter. Occasionally, on fake punts, upbacks will receive the snap instead of the punter. They would then normally run the ball, but they may throw it.

An upback is typically played by a back-up for another position, mostly a fullback, running back, tight end or a linebacker. This position is usually referred to simply as a special teamer, or even a gunner (though that word is used more often for a different position). A notable upback was Nate Ebner, formerly of the New England Patriots. A former rugby union player, Ebner used his versatility in order to execute fake punts and protect the punter.
