= Bukovany =

Bukovany may refer to places in the Czech Republic:

- Bukovany (Benešov District), a municipality and village in the Central Bohemian Region
- Bukovany (Hodonín District), a municipality and village in the South Moravian Region
- Bukovany (Olomouc District), a municipality and village in the Olomouc Region
- Bukovany (Příbram District), a municipality and village in the Central Bohemian Region
- Bukovany (Sokolov District), a municipality and village in the Karlovy Vary Region
- Bukovany, a village and part of Nový Bor in the Liberec Region
