= Hole (disambiguation) =

A hole is a hollow place, an opening in/through a solid body, or an excavation in the ground.

Hole or holes may also refer to:

== Science and healthcare ==
- Black hole
- Electron hole, a concept in physics and chemistry
- K-hole, a psychological state associated with ketamine use
- Sinkhole, a hole in the ground due to natural subterranean subsidence
- White hole
- Wormhole
- Hole (topology) – in a topological space, a hole is a sphere that cannot be continuously extended to a ball.
- Removable discontinuities, also sometimes called holes

== Technology ==
- Blind hole, a hole, usually drilled, which does not emerge on the other side of the substrate
- Buttonhole, a hole in fabric as part of a fastener
- Punchhole, a hole punched in paper, including punched cards and punched tape
- Sound hole, on a musical instrument
- Through hole, a hole, usually drilled, which emerges on the other side of the substrate
- Tone hole, an opening in a wind instrument which, when closed changes the pitch
- Touch hole, part of a gun or cannon where the powder is ignited
- Whitewater hole, a feature found in some white-water rapids

== Construction ==
- Foxhole, a defensive fighting position
- Lightening hole a hole made in a structural member, usually of a vehicle, to lighten it
- Manhole, an opening in the ground to access the sewers or other underground services
- Murder-hole, or meurtrière, a hole in the ceiling of a gateway or passageway in a fortification through which the defenders could fire, throw, or pour harmful substances or objects down on attackers
- Porthole, a window on a ship's external hull
- Spider hole, a type of camouflaged one-man foxhole

== People with the name ==
- Hole (surname)
- Holes (surname)

== Places ==
- Hôle, a municipality in Belgium also called Halen
- Høle, a borough in Sandnes Municipality in Rogaland county, Norway
- Høle Municipality, a former municipality in Rogaland county, Norway
- Hole Municipality, a municipality in Buskerud county, Norway

== Prison ==
- Black Hole of Calcutta, small prison or dungeon in Fort William
- Celle Hole (German: Celler Loch), a breach in the outer wall of the prison of Celle, Germany
- In US prison slang, "The Hole" is a term for solitary confinement

== Arts, entertainment, and media ==
=== Films ===
- Hole (film), 2014 Canadian short drama film directed by Martin Edralin
- Holes (film), 2003 theatrical adaptation of Louis Sachar's novel

=== Games ===
- Hole (chess), a chess term
- Hole, a poker term

=== Literature ===
- Holes (novel), 1998 young adult mystery by Louis Sachar
  - Holes (play), 1998 stage adaptation of Louis Sachar's novel
- Plot hole, in writing

=== Music ===
==== Groups ====
- Hole (band), an alternative rock band formed by Courtney Love and Eric Erlandson in 1989

==== Albums and EPs ====
- Hole (EP), 2005 EP by 65daysofstatic
- Hole (Foetus album), 1984 album by Foetus
- Hole (Merzbow album), 1994 album by Merzbow
- Hole (One-Eyed Doll album), 2007 album by American band One-Eyed Doll
- Holes (album), 2004 album by melpo mene

=== Songs ===
- "Hole" (song), by Kelly Clarkson on the 2007 album My December
- "Holes" (Mercury Rev song), from the 1999 album Deserter's Songs
- "Holes" (Passenger song), a 2013 single from the 2012 album All the Little Lights
- "Holes", by Pint Shot Riot from the 2008 EP Round One
- "Holes", by Electric Guest from the 2012 album Mondo
- "Holes", by Scratch Acid from the 1986 album Just Keep Eating
- "Holes", by Rascal Flatts from the 2004 album Feels Like Today
- "Holes", by Jon Oliva's Pain from the 2006 album Maniacal Renderings
- "Holes", a 1985 single by Specimen
- "Holes", by Mateo Messina from the soundtrack to the 2015 film Barely Lethal
- "Holes" (born 1987), by Jetty Rae from the 2008 album Blackberries
- "Holes", by Smile Empty Soul from the 2005 album Anxiety
- "Holes", by Red Plastic Bag

=== Television ===
- "Hole" (Bottom), an episode of the British television sitcom Bottom
- "Holes" (American Horror Story), a 2017 episode of the anthology television series American Horror Story

== Sports ==
- Hole (American football), a space between the defensive linemen
- Hole (golf), a segment of a golf course
- Hole in one (also known as a hole-in-one or an ace, mostly in American English), occurs when a ball hit from a tee to start a hole finishes in the cup
  - Hole-in-one Register (or United States Golf Register), the United States' official historical registry of holes-in-one
- Hole set, a position in water polo

== Other uses ==
- Law of holes, an adage which states that "if you find yourself in a hole, stop digging"

== See also ==
- Amsterdam Airport Schiphol
- Gap (disambiguation)
- Hol (disambiguation)
- Orifice (disambiguation)
- The Hole (disambiguation)
- Void (disambiguation)
- Whole (disambiguation)
