= Rush (gridiron football) =

Term in gridiron football

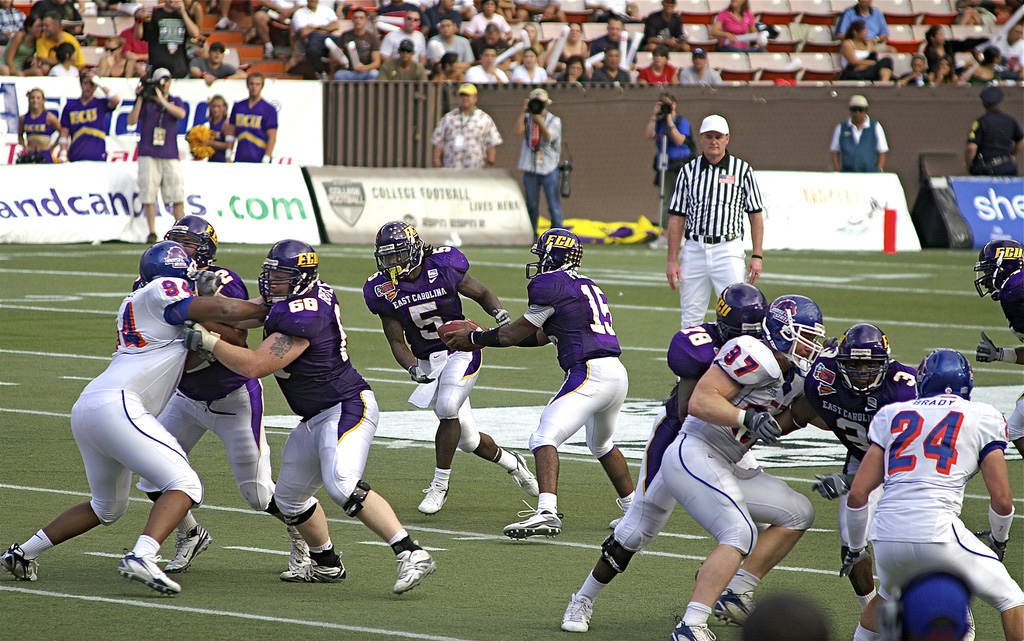
Running back Chris Johnson of the East Carolina Pirates (No. 5) rushing with the ball during the 2007 Hawaii Bowl.

In gridiron football, rushing is an action taken by the offense, usually by the halfback or running back, but it can also be by the quarterback, fullback or wide receiver, that means to advance the ball by running with it, as opposed to passing or kicking.

== Running ==
Rushing, on offense, is running with the ball when starting from behind the line of scrimmage with an intent of gaining yardage. While this usually means a running play, any offensive play that does not involve a forward pass is a rush - also called a run. It is usually done by the halfback/ running back after a handoff from the quarterback, although quarterbacks, fullbacks and wide receivers can also rush. The quarterback will usually run when a passing play has broken down – such as when there is no receiver open to catch the ball – and there is room to run down the field. A team with a quarterback who is fast and skilled at running may regularly call intentional running plays for that quarterback, but this is rare due to the increased risk of injury. A wide receiver can act as a rusher on several kinds of plays, such as on a reverse, on an end-around, or on a lateral pass behind the line of scrimmage, which is a type of screen pass. However, a wide receiver screen play is usually intended to be a forward pass so that if the receiver drops the ball it is an incomplete pass instead of a fumble.

A rushing attempt may also be referred to as a carry, with any yards gained referred to as rushing yards, as in "the running back had 20 carries for 100 rushing yards."

== See also ==
- Dual-threat quarterback
