= Draw play =

American football run play

A draw play, or simply draw for short, is a type of Canadian football and American football play. The draw is a running play disguised as a passing play. It is the opposite of a play-action pass, which is a passing play disguised as a running play. The play is often used in long yardage situations.

The idea behind a draw play is to attack aggressive, pass-rushing defenses by "drawing" the defensive linemen across the line of scrimmage towards the passer while the linebackers and defensive backs commit to positioning themselves downfield in anticipation of a pass. This creates larger gaps between defenders and thereby allows the offense to effectively run the ball. Draw plays are often run out of the shotgun formation, but can also be run when the quarterback is under center. These types of draw plays are sometimes referred to as "delayed handoffs".

The running back will most often run straight downfield through the hole in the "A-gap" (the space between the center and the offensive guard), although there are more complicated variations. The most common variation of this play is the "quarterback draw," where the quarterback himself runs the ball, instead of handing it off, meaning the running back is free to help block.

== History ==
The history of who came up with the draw play is disputed. One idea is that it arose from necessity in the late 1940s when Packers linebacker Buckets Goldenberg noticed a different stance on plays dropping back from center to pass in the Bears T formation with quarterback Sid Luckman and thus adjusted to go with persistent blitz or not. Bears center Bulldog Turner supposedly suggested to do a fake dropback that would go for a run. The draw was also allegedly invented by the Cleveland Browns during their years in the All-America Football Conference. A botched play, originally designed to be a pass play, caused quarterback Otto Graham to improvise a hand-off to fullback Marion Motley. A surprised Motley, who had been expecting to block on the play, instead ran for a big gain. Coach Paul Brown noted the success of the improvised play and began to work it in as a regular play, quickly creating four different versions of it. By 1950, the term began appearing in print among various places such as Rice vs North Carolina in the 1950 Cotton Bowl Classic.

== Maneuvers ==
Offensive movement during a draw play

- The quarterback drops back to pass, just long enough to get the pass rush to come upfield.
- The offensive linemen momentarily show pass block, but also try to push the defenders to the outside, creating a crease in the middle.
- The running back momentarily fakes as if he is staying in to help pass protect, then takes the hand-off from the quarterback and heads downfield through the crease created by the linemen.
- The receivers run clear-out routes downfield in order to take the defensive backs out of the play.
