= Wholeness =

Wholeness may refer to:

- Holism, the idea that systems and their properties should be viewed as wholes, not just as a collection of parts
- Integrity, the ethical quality of being honest and having strong moral principles

== As a proper noun ==
- Wholeness (album)

== See also ==
- Whole (disambiguation)
- Completeness (disambiguation)
- Totality (disambiguation)
