= Vlasta Fialová (archaeologist) =

Czech art historian and archaeologist (1896–1972)

- Fialová in 1970
- Born: 5 June 1896; Holešov, Moravia, Austria-Hungary
- Died: 6 February 1972 (aged 75); Brno, Czechoslovakia
- Education: Faculty of Arts, Charles University in Prague
- Occupations: historian, archaeologist

Vlasta Fialová (5 June 1896 – 6 February 1972) was a Czech archaeologist and art historian.

== Early life and education ==
Fialová was born on 5 June 1896 in Holešov. From 1917 to 1921, she studied history and geography at the Faculty of Arts, Charles University. She received her doctorate in 1935 from Masaryk University for her thesis: Kritický rozbor kroniky Holešovské (A Critical Analysis of the Holešov Chronicle).

== Career ==
Until 1949, Fialová worked as a teacher in secondary schools in Bystřice pod Hostýnem, Olomouc, Bukovany, and Brno. During this period, her other professional activities were linked to the Moravské zemské muzeum. She initially worked in the Ethnography Department, and from 1952, she served as the head of the newly established History Department.

Her professional work initially focused on the Hussite Wars, but later shifted toward the early modern period. Specifically, she concentrated on the activities of the Unity of the Brethren within the Moravia. In 1953, she conducted exploratory research at the site of the former Moravian Church chapel in the town of Ivančice. Through targeted excavations, she managed to identify the layout of the main section of the chapel with such precision that she was able to reconstruct its floor plan even though this part of the structure had been completely concealed by later construction.

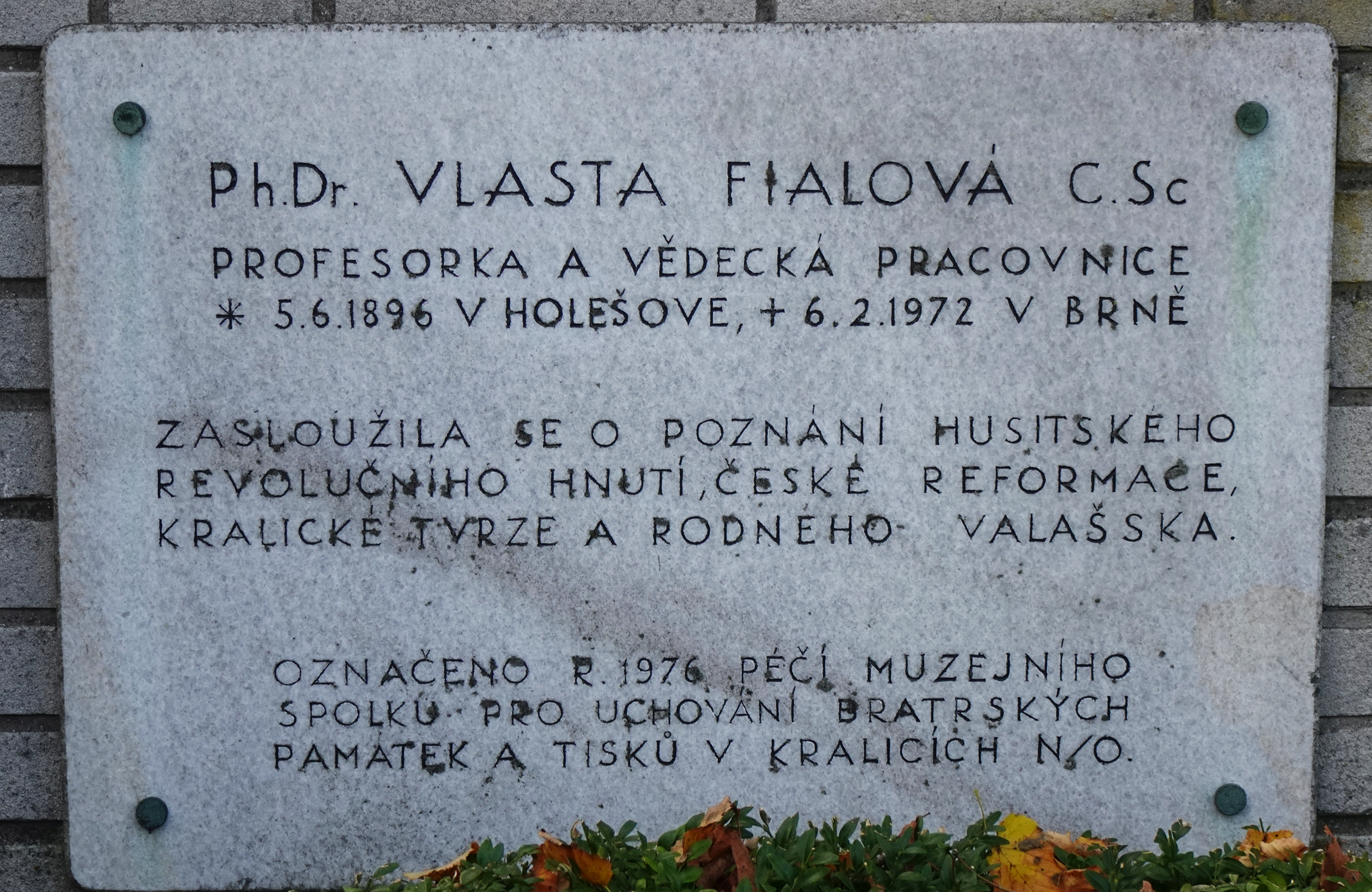
Grave of Fialová in Bystřice pod Hostýnem

Shortly thereafter, in 1954, she assumed responsibility for the collections of the Kralice Museum Society on behalf of the Moravské zemské muzeum. This led to a shift in her focus from Ivančice the original site of the Moravian Church printing press (established by Jan Blahoslav) to the town of Kralice nad Oslavou, where the press had been relocated during a perilous period.

In 1956, she began her research at this site, which yielded remarkable results. The discovery of thousands of letters, printed materials, book bindings, and other historical artifacts confirmed both the location and the significance of the Ivančice-Kralice printing press. It is also worth noting that, between 1967 and 1969, he contributed to the creation of the Bible of Kralice Monument, a structure built according to an architectural design by Bohuslav Fuchs.

== Death ==
Fialová died on 6 February 1972 in Brno and was buried in a cemetery in Bystřice pod Hostýnem.
