= Defensive end =

Defensive position in the sport of American and Canadian football

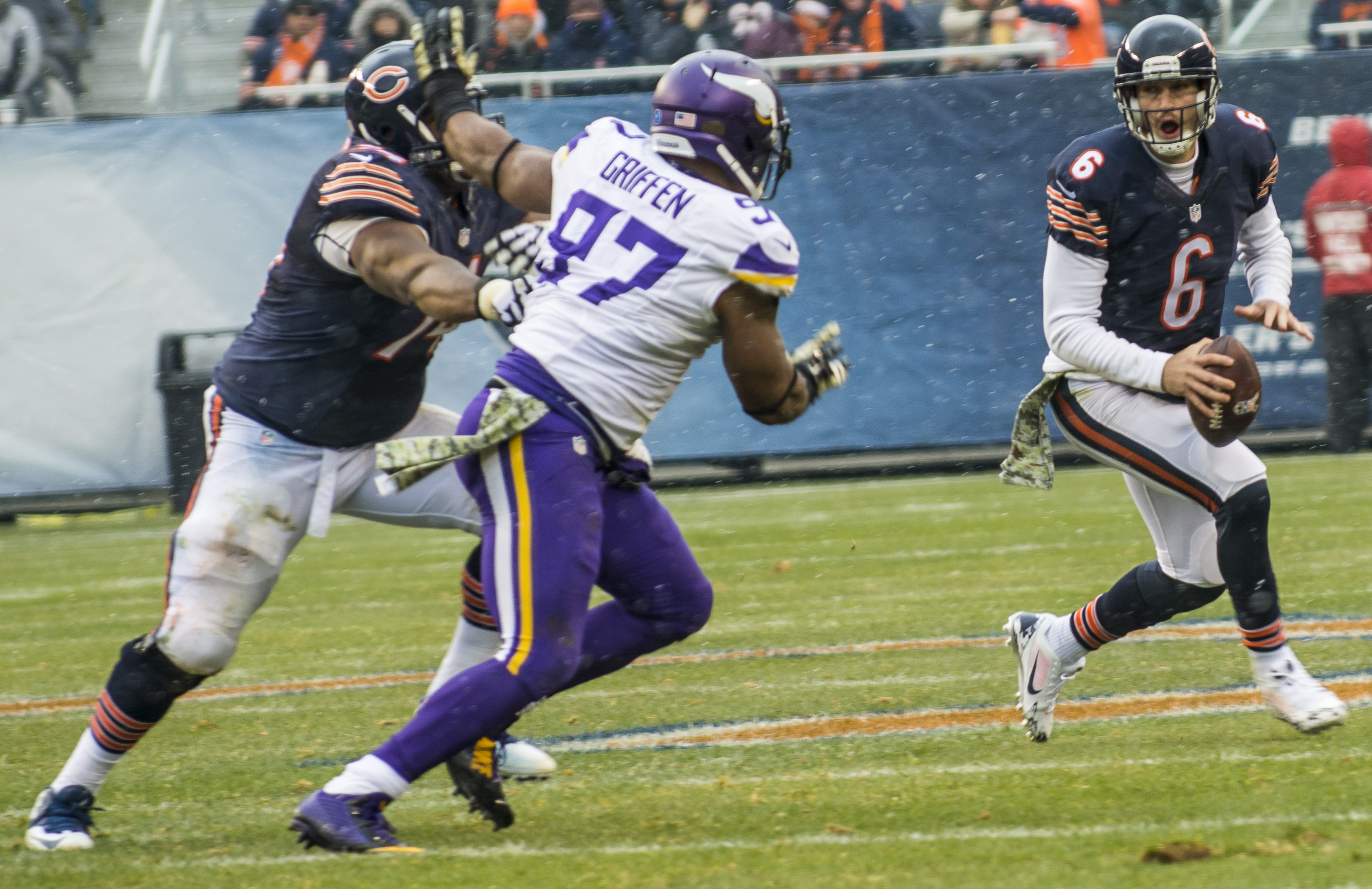
Defensive end Everson Griffen with the Minnesota Vikings (No. 97 in white jersey) rushing Chicago Bears quarterback Jay Cutler (No. 6 in navy blue jersey) at Soldier Field in 2014

Defensive end (DE) is a defensive position in the sport of gridiron football.

This position has designated the players at each end of the defensive line, but changes in formations over the years have substantially changed how the position is played.

== History ==
The defensive end position (DE) in a base 4–3 defense

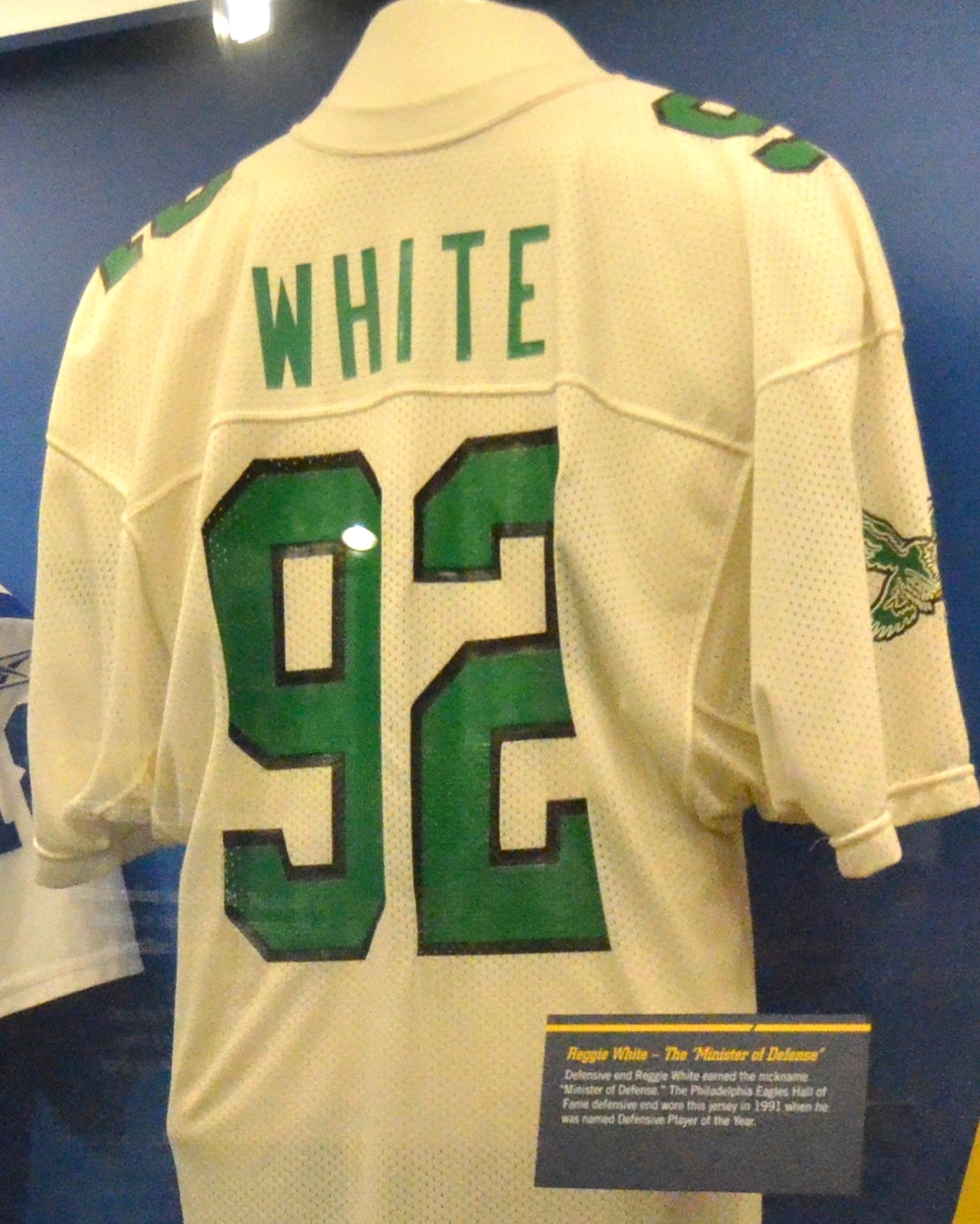
The Philadelphia Eagles jersey of Reggie White, widely considered one of the best defensive ends in the history of the National Football League, on display at the Pro Football Hall of Fame in Canton, Ohio

Early formations, with six- and seven-man lines, used the end as a containment player, whose job was first to prevent an "end run" around his position, then secondarily to force plays inside.

When most teams adopted a five-man line, two different styles of end play developed: "crashing" ends, who rushed into the backfield to disrupt plays, and "stand-up" or "waiting" ends, who played the more traditional containment style. Some teams would use both styles of end play, depending on game situations.

Typically, defensive ends start in a three-point stance, with their free hand cocked back ready to "punch" an offensive lineman or in a two-point stance like a strong safety, springing into action as soon as the ball has been "snapped" into play, with the objective of maintaining containment. Some defensive ends play the position due to their size; they close down their gap so the running back has no hole to run through. Other ends play the position due to their speed and agility; they are used to rush the quarterback. These ends attempt to time the snap of the ball in order to get a jump on the rush and stop the play.

It is usually the job of the defensive end in run defense to keep outside or containment, which means that no one should get to their outside; they must keep everything to the inside. If they have an outside linebacker besides them that is not in pass coverage, this gives the defensive end more freedom to rush the quarterback. The defensive ends are fast for players of their size, often the fastest and smallest players on the defensive line. They must be able to shed blockers to get to the ball. Defensive ends are also often used to cover the outside area of the line of scrimmage, to tackle ball carriers running to the far right or left side, and to defend against screen passes. Since the creation of zone blitz defenses in the late 1990s, defensive ends have sometimes been used in pass coverage, dropping back to cover routes run close to the line of scrimmage.

In the 3–4 defense, defensive ends are used primarily as run stoppers and are much larger than the normal size of a player at this position. Often, the position is played by a more agile or slightly undersized defensive tackle. Because of the increased popularity of the 3–4 defense, the value of a defensive tackle prospect that can possibly be used in this manner has increased. They are used to occupy an offensive lineman, on pass rushing plays to let the outside linebackers get a sack. They block screen passes and are put outside the offensive tackles to get a sack. Defensive ends in the 3–4 defense average a height of 6-foot-3 – 6-foot-8 and a weight of 285–315 lbs.

== See also ==
- Edge rusher
- Glossary of American football
