= Compleat =

Compleat may refer to:

- an archaic spelling of complete
- COMPLEAT (Bioinformatics tool)

== See also ==
- The Compleat Angler, a 1653 fishing book by Izaak Walton
- The Compleat Housewife, a 1727 cookery book by Eliza Smith
