= Holešov =

- Town
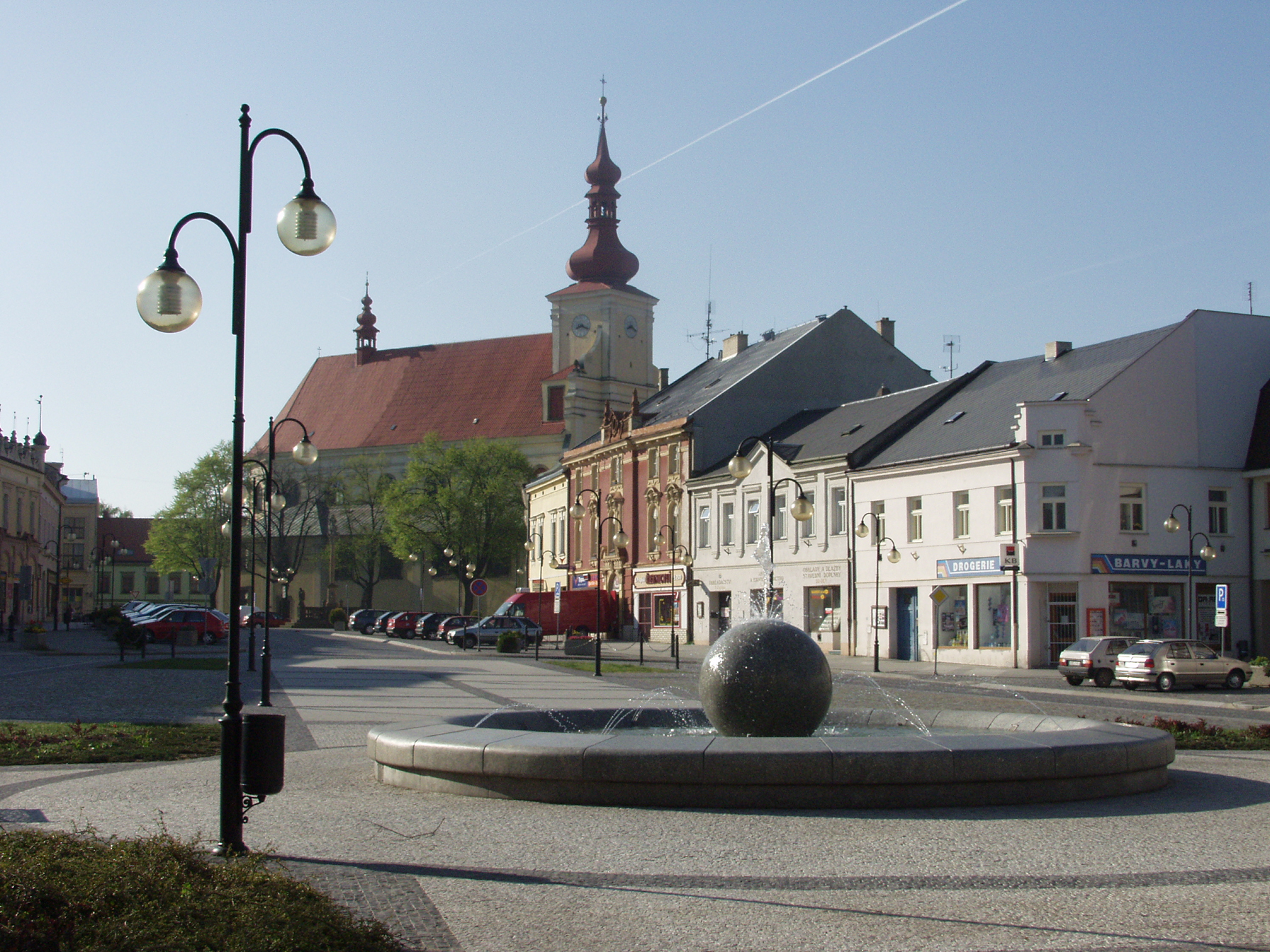
- The square Náměstí Dr. E. Beneše

- Flag Coat of arms

- Location in the Czech Republic
- Coordinates: 49°20′0″N 17°34′42″E
- Country: Czech Republic
- Region: Zlín
- District: Kroměříž
- First mentioned: 1141

Government
  - Mayor: Milan Fritz (ANO)

Area
  - Total: 33.95 km^{2} (13.11 sq mi)
- Elevation: 232 m (761 ft)

Population (2026-01-01)
  - Total: 11,544
  - Density: 340.0/km^{2} (880.7/sq mi)
- Time zone: UTC+1 (CET)
  - Summer (DST): UTC+2 (CEST)
- Postal code: 769 01
- Website: www.holesov.cz

Holešov (Czech pronunciation: [ˈɦolɛʃof]; German: Holleschau) is a town in Kroměříž District in the Zlín Region of the Czech Republic. It has about 12,000 inhabitants. The town proper is located in the Upper Morava Valley on the Rusava Stream.

Holešov existed already in the 12th century and developed into a town at the beginning of the 14th century. In the 15th–20th centuries, the town had a notable Jewish community. Among the main landmark of Holešov are an early Baroque castle and the Church of Assumption of the Virgin Mary. The historic town centre with the castle complex is well preserved and is protected as an urban monument zone.

== Administrative division ==
Holešov consists of six municipal parts (in brackets population according to the 2021 census):

- Holešov (7,847)
- Dobrotice (438)
- Količín (344)
- Tučapy (406)
- Všetuly (1,998)
- Žopy (486)

== Etymology ==
The name Holešov is derived from the personal name Holeš.

== Geography ==
Holešov is located about 12 kilometres (7 mi) east of Kroměříž and 13 km (8 mi) north of Zlín. The Rusava Stream flows through the town.

The western and southern parts of the municipal territory with the town proper lie in a flat landscape in the Upper Morava Valley. The northern part with the villages of Dobrotice and Tučapy lies in the Moravian-Silesian Foothills. A small eastern part of the territory extends into the Hostýn-Vsetín Mountains and includes the highest point of Holešov, the hill Lysina with an elevation of 598 m (1,962 ft).

=== Climate ===
Holešov has a humid continental climate (Köppen: Dfb; Trewartha: Dcbo). The annual average temperature is 9.6 °C (49.3 °F). The annual precipitation is 627.5 millimetres (24.70 in). The extreme temperature throughout the year ranged from −29.9 °C (−21.8 °F) on 7 January 1985 to 36.9 °C (98.4 °F) on 1 August 2013.

Climate data for Holešov (1991–2020 normals, extremes 1954–present)
Month	Jan	Feb	Mar	Apr	May	Jun	Jul	Aug	Sep	Oct	Nov	Dec	Year
Record high °C (°F)	15.6 (60.1)	16.9 (62.4)	24.0 (75.2)	29.3 (84.7)	32.3 (90.1)	35.2 (95.4)	36.3 (97.3)	36.9 (98.4)	31.4 (88.5)	26.0 (78.8)	21.7 (71.1)	15.4 (59.7)	36.9 (98.4)
Mean daily maximum °C (°F)	1.7 (35.1)	4.1 (39.4)	9.2 (48.6)	15.8 (60.4)	20.1 (68.2)	23.8 (74.8)	26.1 (79.0)	26.0 (78.8)	20.3 (68.5)	14.2 (57.6)	8.0 (46.4)	2.6 (36.7)	14.3 (57.7)
Daily mean °C (°F)	−1.1 (30.0)	0.5 (32.9)	4.4 (39.9)	10.0 (50.0)	14.5 (58.1)	18.1 (64.6)	19.9 (67.8)	19.7 (67.5)	14.7 (58.5)	9.5 (49.1)	4.9 (40.8)	0.2 (32.4)	9.6 (49.3)
Mean daily minimum °C (°F)	−4.5 (23.9)	−3.5 (25.7)	−0.6 (30.9)	3.4 (38.1)	8.0 (46.4)	11.5 (52.7)	13.2 (55.8)	13.3 (55.9)	9.5 (49.1)	5.3 (41.5)	1.6 (34.9)	−2.7 (27.1)	4.5 (40.1)
Record low °C (°F)	−29.9 (−21.8)	−26.9 (−16.4)	−19.7 (−3.5)	−8.8 (16.2)	−3.1 (26.4)	1.1 (34.0)	3.7 (38.7)	2.4 (36.3)	−3.0 (26.6)	−9.1 (15.6)	−17.2 (1.0)	−23.8 (−10.8)	−29.9 (−21.8)
Average precipitation mm (inches)	28.4 (1.12)	29.8 (1.17)	36.3 (1.43)	37.7 (1.48)	72.3 (2.85)	80.1 (3.15)	87.4 (3.44)	67.7 (2.67)	67.6 (2.66)	44.2 (1.74)	40.6 (1.60)	35.5 (1.40)	627.5 (24.70)
Average snowfall cm (inches)	16.0 (6.3)	13.7 (5.4)	5.4 (2.1)	0.7 (0.3)	0.0 (0.0)	0.0 (0.0)	0.0 (0.0)	0.0 (0.0)	0.0 (0.0)	0.1 (0.0)	3.5 (1.4)	12.3 (4.8)	51.6 (20.3)
Average precipitation days (≥ 1.0 mm)	7.1	6.6	7.9	7.2	9.7	8.9	9.9	8.0	7.9	7.6	7.1	7.4	95.3
Average relative humidity (%)	84.7	80.5	74.5	66.9	69.6	70.2	68.9	69.0	75.9	80.9	84.8	86.4	76.0
Mean monthly sunshine hours	48.8	78.0	129.7	196.1	234.5	245.1	252.5	248.1	170.9	111.6	53.7	39.6	1,808.6
Source 1: NOAA
Source 2: Czech Hydrometeorological Institute (extremes)

== History ==
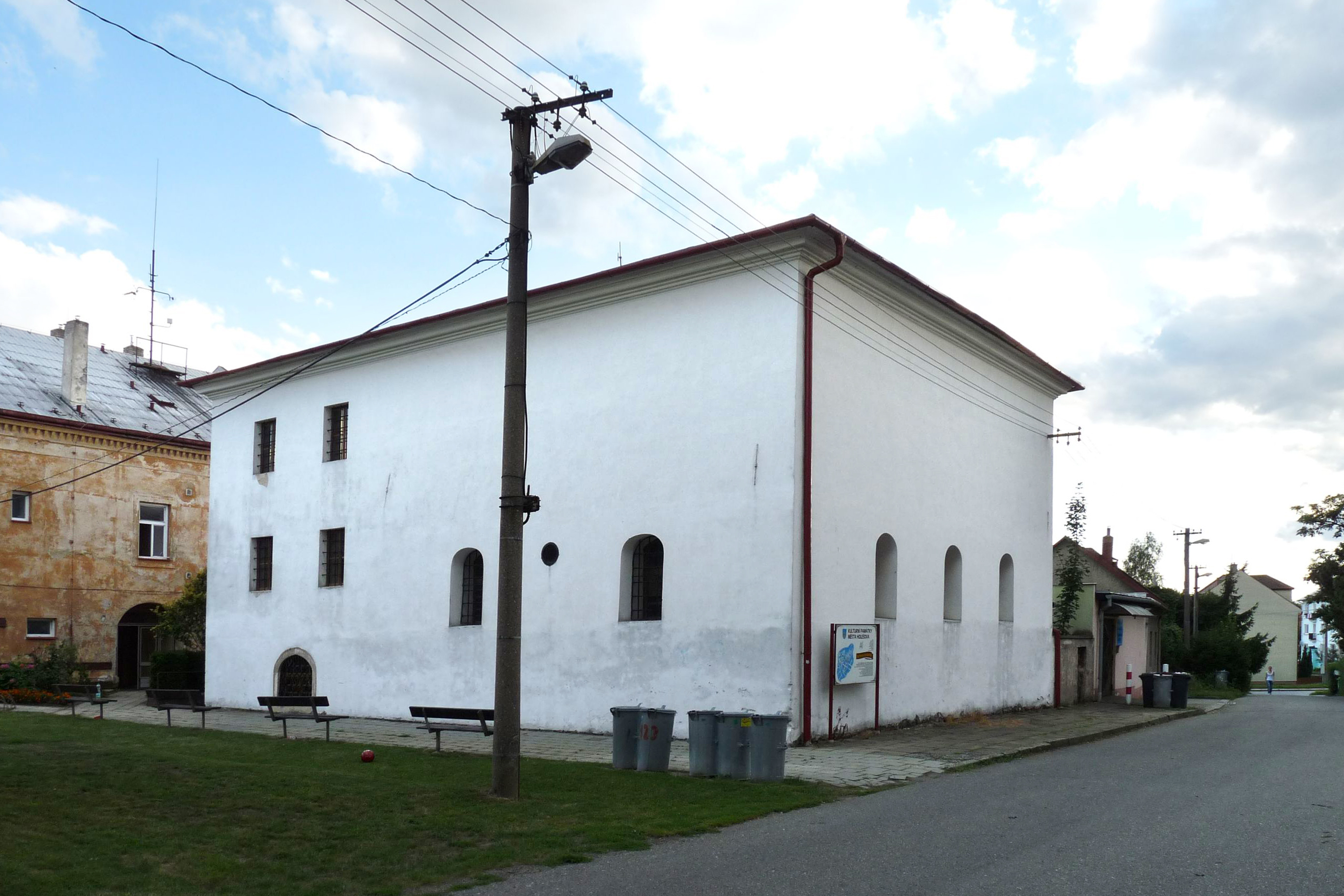
Old Synagogue

The first written mention of Holešov is from 1141 in a deed of Jindřich Zdík, when the settlement was a fief of the bishops of Olomouc. Between 1300 and 1322, the market village transformed into a town.

In the second half of the 14th century, Holešov was acquired by the lords of Sternberg. In the late 16th century, the town was held by Karel Sr. of Zierotin and later by Ladislav IV Popel of Lobkowicz. In 1574, the local Gothic fortress was rebuilt into a Renaissance residence. Holešov suffered during the Thirty Years' War and in 1643, the castle and two thirds of the town were burned down. From 1650 to 1762, Holešov was owned by the Rottal family. During their rule, the town was reconstructed, and a large castle with a Baroque French-style garden and the Church of Assumption of the Virgin Mary were built.

The last noble owners of Holešov were the Vrbna family. After 1848, Holešov became a district town and the economic centre of the region. The town began to industrialise and the main industries were the woodworking, furniture, knitting and food industries. In 1960, the district of Holešov was dissolved.

=== Jewish presence ===
The first mention of Jewish presence in the town is from 1391. The Jewish community began to form here after 1454, when the Jews were expelled from royal towns. During the 17th century, Rabbi Shach served as a rabbi in Holešov until his death. From 1849 until 1918, the Jewish community had its own administration separated from the town. In these times, the community participated on the town's industrialisation and included successful entrepreneurs. The Jews almost disappeared from Holešov during World War II as a result of the Holocaust.

The Old Synagogue was built after the local wooden synagogue was destroyed by a fire in 1560. The New Synagogue was built in 1893 and destroyed by the Nazis in 1941.

== Demographics ==
Historical population

Year	Pop.	±%
1869	6,924	—
1880	7,267	+5.0%
1890	8,012	+10.3%
1900	8,907	+11.2%
1910	9,875	+10.9%

Year	Pop.	±%
1921	9,714	−1.6%
1930	10,184	+4.8%
1950	9,759	−4.2%
1961	10,994	+12.7%
1970	10,972	−0.2%

Year	Pop.	±%
1980	12,317	+12.3%
1991	12,717	+3.2%
2001	12,463	−2.0%
2011	11,755	−5.7%
2021	11,519	−2.0%

Source: Censuses

== Economy ==
The public airport of regional importance in the southern part of Holešov was transformed into the Strategic Industrial Zone, which is one of the largest industrial zones in the country.

== Transport ==
The short finished section of the D49 motorway connects Holešov with Hulín, where is the junction of the D1 and D55 motorways.

Holešov is located on the railway line Rožnov pod Radhoštěm–Kojetín.

== Sights ==
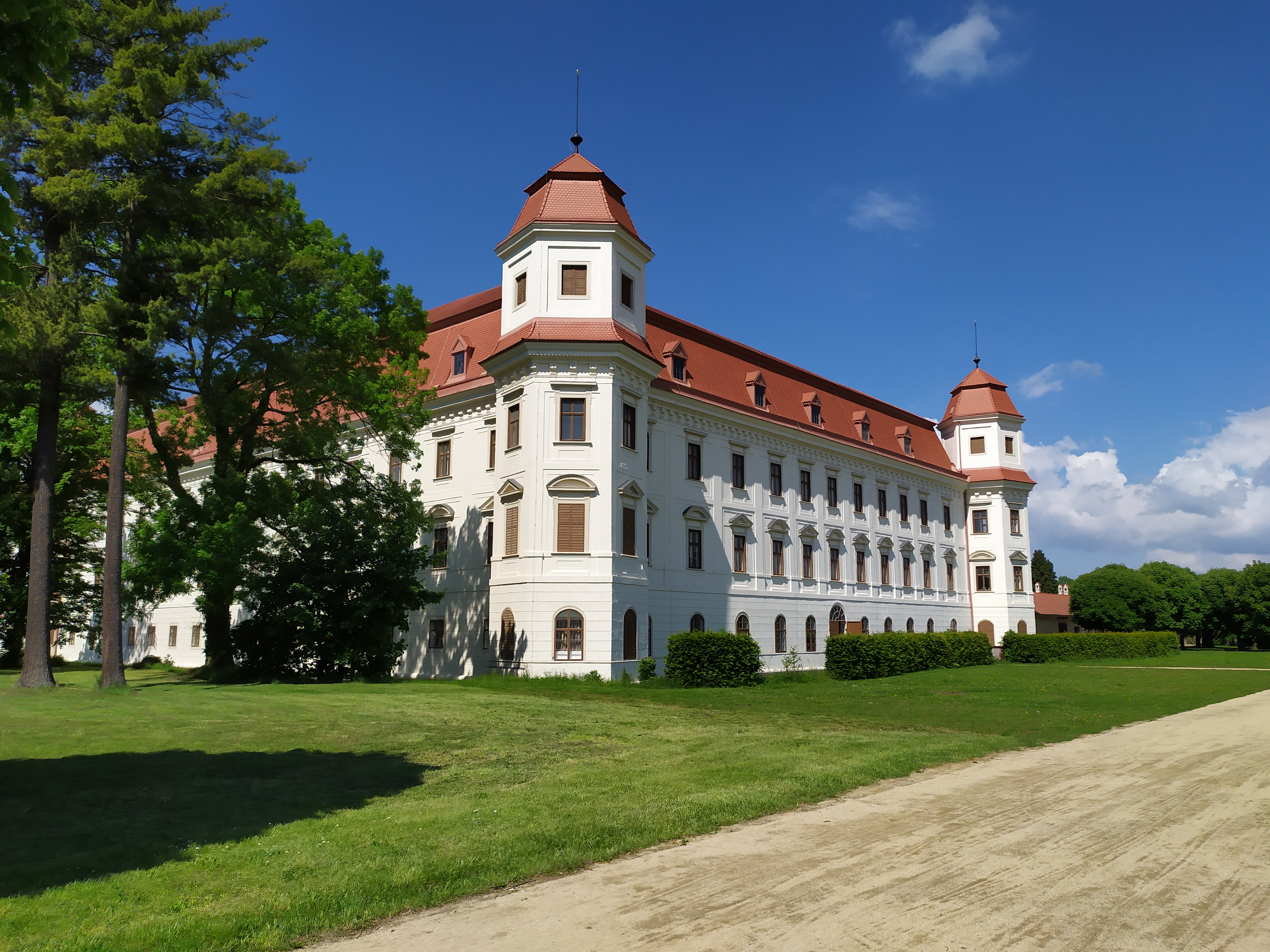
Holešov Castle

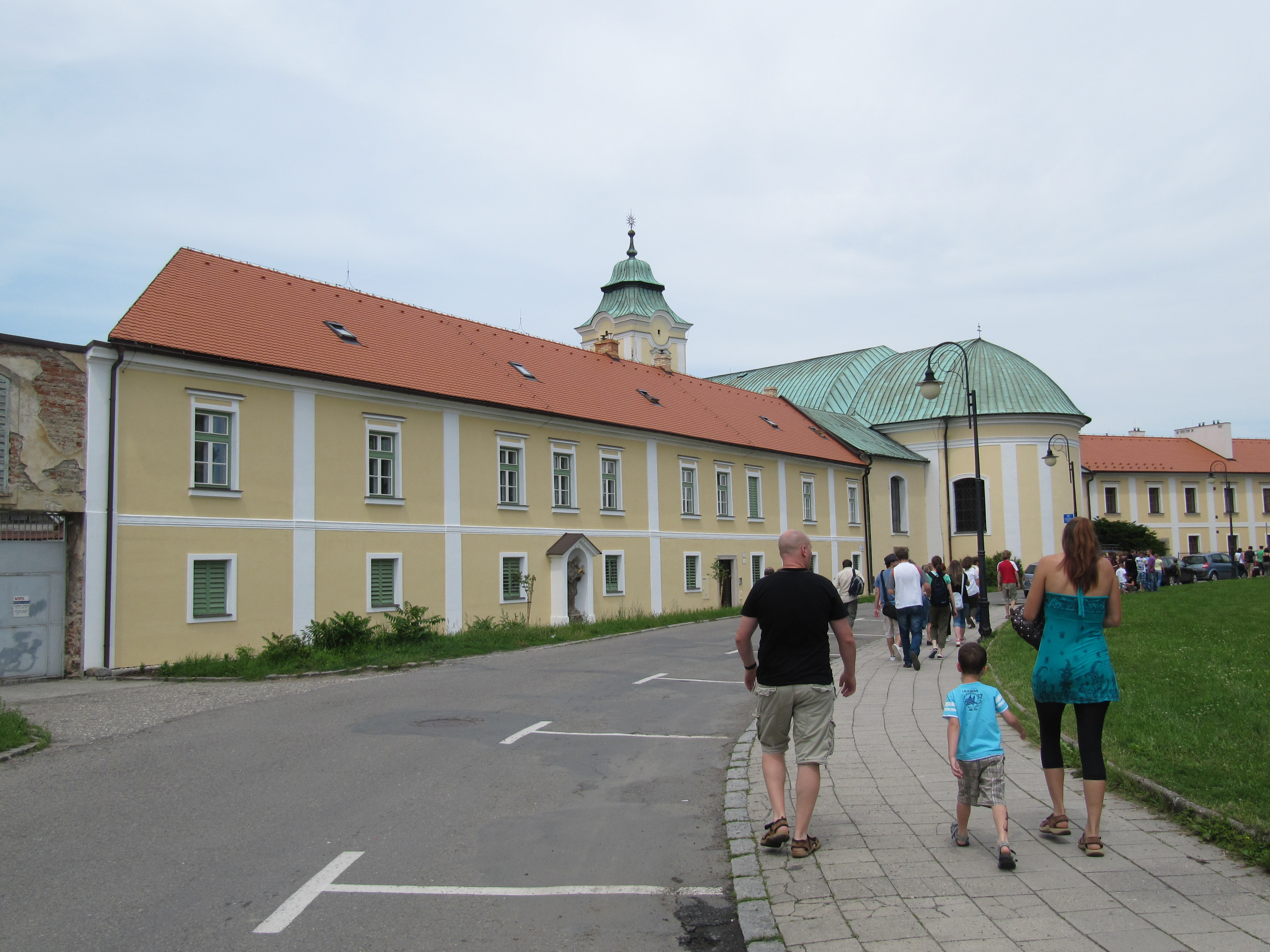
Former Trinitarian monastery

Holešov is known for its large castle with the French-style garden complex and a game park. The early Baroque castle was built in 1655–1674. Today the castle is open to the public and also houses the town museum and art gallery.

The main landmark of the town square is the Church of Assumption of the Virgin Mary. The parish Baroque church was built in 1708 and consecrated in 1735. In 1748, the Black Chapel was added to the church. Under the chapel is the crypt of the noble families of Rottal and Vrbna.

Trinitarian monastery is a valuable Baroque complex of buildings, built in 1748–1750. Its Church of Saint Anne was originally a part of the pre-castle complex.

The Old Synagogue is the second oldest synagogue in Moravia. It is an uncommon synagogue of the Polish type built in the Renaissance style which includes ornate ironwork and paintings on ceilings and walls using floral and animal motifs. The Old Synagogue, also known as the "Shakh" or "Šach" Synagogue, was preserved because it looked like an ordinary building from outside. Today it contains an exhibition about the life of Jews in Moravia.

The Jewish cemetery contains about 3,000 graves. The oldest preserved tombstones are from 1647.

== Notable people ==
- Jan of Holešov (1366–1436), writer, linguist, musicologist and ethnographer
- Franz Xaver Richter (1709–1789), Austro-Moravian singer, violinist and composer
- Josef Drásal (1841–1886), the tallest Czech ever; lived and died here
- Mavro Frankfurter (1875–1942), Croatian rabbi
- Vlasta Fialová (1896–1972), archaeologist and historian
- Oldřich Vyhlídal (1921–1989), poet and translator

== Twin towns – sister cities ==
Holešov is twinned with:

- Desinić, Croatia
- Považská Bystrica, Slovakia
- Pszczyna, Poland
- Skawina, Poland
- Topoľčianky, Slovakia
- Turčianske Teplice, Slovakia

Holešov also cooperates with Gloggnitz in Austria.
