= Completion =

Completion may refer to:

- Completion (gridiron football)
- Completion (oil and gas wells)
- Completion, a 2004 studio album by Bodychoke
- One of the landmarks in conveyancing, transfer of the title of property from one person to another

== Mathematics ==
- Completion (metric space), constructing the smallest complete metric space containing a given space
- Construction of a complete measure space
- Dedekind–MacNeille completion, constructing the smallest complete lattice containing a given partial order
- Completion (algebra)
- completions in category theory

== Computer science ==
- Autocomplete, predicting a phrase the user is about to type in
- Knuth–Bendix completion algorithm, transforming an equation set into a confluent term rewriting system

== See also ==
- Completeness (disambiguation)
