= End-around =

American football rushing play using a receiver

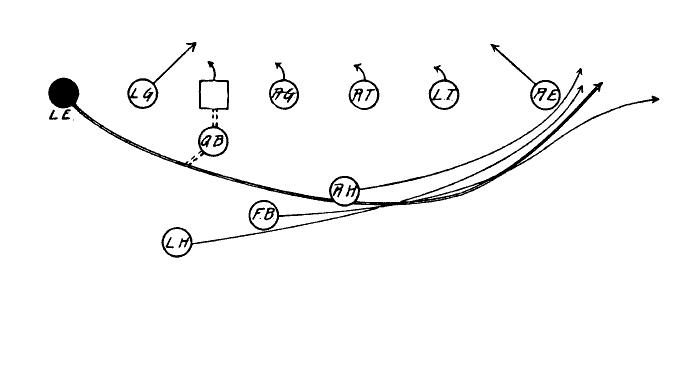
An old end-around diagram.

The end-around is a play in American football in which an end or wide receiver crosses the backfield towards the opposite end of the line and receives a handoff directly from the quarterback. The receiver then may proceed to do one of two things: he either runs the ball towards the line of scrimmage in order to gain yardage, or more rarely, attempts to pass to another eligible pass receiver. Both versions of the end-around are uncommon and can be considered trick plays. The play can also be combined with a Statue of Liberty play.

The end-around should not be confused with an end reverse, in which the receiver takes a handoff from a player who has already taken a handoff from the quarterback.

End-arounds are usually preferred to reverses in the NFL; although they are less convincing, they offer lower risk. End-arounds offer less chance of a fumble, as there is only one handoff rather than two. Also, end-arounds require less time to complete, thus reducing the chance of a large loss of yardage.

== Fly sweep ==
End-around is a type of special run play in football. Whereas in the end around the receiver crosses the backfield after the snap, in the jet sweep, the receiver goes in motion and the quarterback calls for the snap just as the receiver passes him. The fly sweep is commonly seen at the high school and college level, but not as often at the professional level due to the defensive linemen generally being faster and thus able to stop the play for minimal or no gain, or even a loss.

== Fake end-around ==
A derivative of the end-around has the quarterback hand off to a running back, then pretend he still has the ball, and is giving it to the wide receiver circling behind the action. This causes the defenders who should be covering the end around to 'stay at home' and not participate in pursuing the actual ball carrier, and desensitizes the defense to the threat of the actual end-around play when it is run. The player executing the fake may be called the "ghost".

Another variation has the quarterback fake the end-around handoff, then either run with the ball himself in the other direction, or pass to a receiver, including the one to whom the fake was made. This is a form of play-action pass; some of the pass rushers may slow down the attack on the quarterback because of the fake, allowing more time for the receivers to get open.

Often, a team will alternate between running an actual end-around and running a fake end-around on a large percentage of running plays. This technique is intended to increase the effectiveness of the play as the game develops, due to defenders becoming much more hesitant to commit either way. Early on the play may not be as effective, but gradually the defenders may lose their aggressiveness and thus the play can be relied on for a decent gain late in the game.

== History ==
Some attribute the play's invention to Amos Alonzo Stagg.
