= Play from scrimmage =

Sequence of play in gridiron football

A play from scrimmage is the sequence in the game of gridiron football during which one team tries to advance the ball, get a first down, or score, and the other team tries to stop them or take the ball away. Once a play is over, and before the next play starts, the football is considered dead. A game of American football (or Canadian Football) consists of many (about 120–150) such plays.

== Specifications ==
The term is also used to denote a specific plan of action, or its execution, under a particular set of circumstances faced by either team. For instance, the offensive team may be faced with one or two downs left in a possession and still ten or more yards to go to earn a new set of downs. In this instance, they may decide to employ a forward pass. Well in advance of the particular game, a number of different kinds of forward pass plays will have been planned out and practiced by the team. They will be designated by obscure words, letters and/or numbers so that the name of a play does not reveal its exact execution to outsiders. The team's coach, or perhaps the quarterback, will choose one of the planned forward passing strategies, and tell the team, during the huddle which one has been chosen. Because of planning and practice, each player is expected to know what his role in the play is to be, and how to execute it. This will be the offensive play.

Conversely, the defensive team will know that the offense has to cover a good deal of ground in a single play, will expect a forward pass, and will know from earlier study something of the propensities of the offense they face. The defensive captain is likely to call out a specific formation or defensive play, to anticipate and counteract the expected action by the offense.

== The play ==
The play will begin with the snap of the ball (typically but not exclusively to the quarterback), and it will end when the effort by the offensive squad to advance the ball has either succeeded in scoring, or has been frustrated by the ball being downed before the aim of the offensive play is accomplished, or by the defensive squad having managed to come into possession of the ball without first downing it. In the event of change of possession during a play, the team newly in possession of the ball may try to advance it toward their opponent's goal, which the team formerly in possession will naturally resist. Change of possession during a routine play may occur by interception or by fumble (often collectively referred to as turnovers).

Change of possession may also occur in other ways. A change of possession can occur "on downs", if the offensive team fails to achieve a first down or a touchdown in a specified number of consecutive attempts, known as "downs" (four in American football; three in Canadian football). Another way is through a change of possession play, when the offensive team (having perhaps surmised the unlikelihood of scoring or of achieving a first down within the allowed consecutive attempts to do so) kicks the ball away in what is known as a punt. A touchdown (and subsequent conversion attempt, whether successful or not) or successful field goal attempt will be followed by a kickoff. Kickoffs and field goal attempts are not considered true change of possession plays. An unsuccessful field goal attempt will usually also result in a change of possession (without a kickoff), but is usually not counted as a turnover.

== See also ==
- Glossary of American football
