= Completely =

Completely may refer to:

- Completely (Diamond Rio album)
- Completely (Christian Bautista album), 2005
- "Completely", a song by American singer and songwriter Michael Bolton
- "Completely", a song by Serial Joe from (Last Chance) At the Romance Dance..., 2001
- "Completely", a song by Shane Filan from Love Always, 2017
- "Completely", a song by Blue October from This Is What I Live For, 2020

== See also ==
- Completeness (disambiguation)
