= The Hole =

The Hole may refer to:

== Arts, entertainment, and media ==
=== Films ===
- The Hole (1957 film), a Japanese drama directed by Kon Ichikawa
- The Hole (1960 film), a French film directed by Jacques Becker
- The Hole (1962 film), an animated short film directed by John Hubley
- The Hole (1997 film), a South Korean thriller directed by Kim Sung-hong
- The Hole (1998 film), a Taiwanese drama directed by Tsai Ming-Liang
- "The Hole" (I Am Weasel), a 1998 episode of I Am Weasel
- The Hole (2001 film), a British thriller directed by Nick Hamm
- The Hole (2009 film), a 3D film directed by Joe Dante
- The Hole, two short 2016 documentaries on the Montreal Protocol by David Attenborough
- The Hole (2020 film), El hoyo, a Spanish-language film released in English-language regions as The Platform.
- The Hole (2021 film), an Italian film directed by Michelangelo Frammartino
- The Hole (2027 film), a American-South Korean psychological thriller

=== Music ===
- The Hole (album), a 1986 album by Golden Earring
- "The Hole" (song), a 1998 song by Randy Travis
- "The Hole", a song on the 2006 Glen Phillips EP Unlucky 7

=== Other uses in arts, entertainment, and media ===
- The Hole (play), a 1958 absurdist play
- The Hole (Oyamada novel), a 2014 Japanese novel written by Hiroko Oyamada.
- The Hole (Pyun novel), a 2016 Korean novel written by Pyun Hye-Young

== Places ==
- The Hole (lake), a small glacial lake in Elmore County, Idaho
- The Hole (Scientology), a detention facility operated by the Church of Scientology
- The Hole, New York City, a neighborhood within New York City
- The Hole, a colloquial name for the Underground Complex at Canadian Forces Base North Bay, Canada

== See also ==
- Hole (disambiguation)
