= Completeness =

Complete may refer to:

== Logic ==
- Completeness (logic)
- Completeness of a theory, the property of a theory that every formula in the theory's language or its negation is provable
- Gödel's completeness theorem, correspondence between semantic truth and syntactic provability in first-order logic
- Gödel's incompleteness theorems, limits of provability in formal axiomatic theories

== Mathematics ==
- The completeness of the real numbers, which implies that there are no "gaps" in the real numbers
- Complete metric space, a metric space in which every Cauchy sequence converges
- Complete uniform space, a uniform space where every Cauchy net in converges (or equivalently every Cauchy filter converges)
- Complete measure, a measure space where every subset of every null set is measurable
- Completion (algebra), at an ideal
- Completeness (cryptography)
- Completeness (statistics), a statistic that does not allow an unbiased estimator of zero
- Complete graph, an undirected graph in which every pair of vertices has exactly one edge connecting them
- Complete tree (abstract data type), a tree with every level filled, except possibly the last
- Complete category, a category C where every diagram from a small category to C has a limit; it is cocomplete if every such functor has a colimit
- Completeness (order theory), a notion that generally refers to the existence of certain suprema or infima of some partially ordered set
- Complete variety, an algebraic variety that satisfies an analog of compactness
- Complete orthonormal basis—see Orthonormal basis § Orthonormal system
- Complete sequence, a type of integer sequence
- Ultrafilter on a set § Completeness

== Computing ==
- Complete (complexity), a notion referring to a problem in computational complexity theory that all other problems in a class reduce to
  - Turing complete set, a related notion from recursion theory
- Completeness (knowledge bases), found in knowledge base theory
- Complete search algorithm, a search algorithm that is guaranteed to find a solution if there is one
- Incomplete database, a compact representation of a set of possible worlds

== Music ==
- Complete (BtoB album), 2015
- Complete (Lila McCann album), 2001
- Complete (News from Babel album), 2006
- Complete (The Smiths album), 2011
- Complete (The Veronicas album), 2009
- "Complete" (Jaimeson song), 2003
- "Complete", a song by Girls' Generation from Girls' Generation, 2007
- "Complete", a song by Kutless from To Know That You're Alive, 2008
- "Complete", a song by Mila J, 2006
- "Completeness", debut album by fictional music group Ave Mujica, 2025
- Completeness, a collection of music videos by Miki Nakatani, 1998

== Other uses ==
- Complete set of commuting operators (or CSCO), a set of commuting operators in quantum mechanics whose eigenvalues are sufficient to specify the physical state of a system
- Complete flower, a flower with both male and female reproductive structures as well as petals and sepals. See Sexual reproduction in plants
- Complete market, a market with negligible transaction costs and a price for every asset
- Completion (oil and gas wells), the process of making a well ready for production

== See also ==
- Completion (disambiguation)
- Completely (disambiguation)
- Compleat (disambiguation)
- Wholeness (disambiguation)
