= Play-action pass =

American football play disguised as a run play, but is actually a passing play

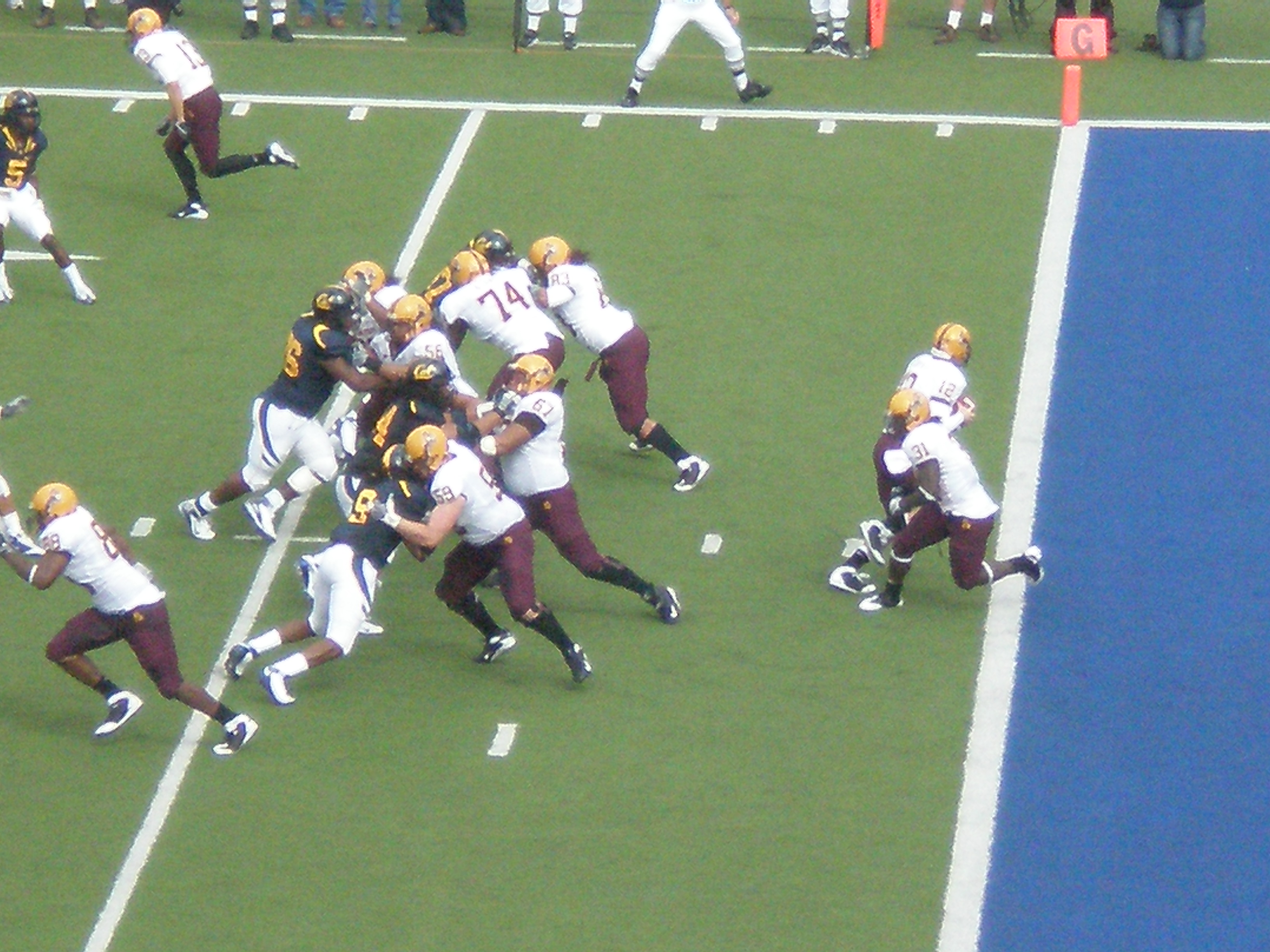
A play action pass

A play-action pass (also known as a play fake or simply "play-action") is an American football play. The play action starts with what appears to be a running play, but turns out to be a pass play; in this way, it can be considered the opposite of a draw play. Play-action passes are often used against defenses that are focused on stopping the run. By initially simulating a running play, the offense attempts to deceive the defense into acting on the fake run placing them out of position in their pass coverage, and giving receivers more time and room to be free to receive passes behind the linebackers.

== Offensive action during a play-action pass ==
- The quarterback takes the snap and drops back to hand off to the running back.
- The running back gets ready to take the hand off.
- The quarterback quickly pulls the ball back from the hand off position, trying to hide it from the defense. He then looks downfield for an open receiver.
- The running back continues to move upfield as if he has the ball in his hands.
- The offensive line comes off the ball to run block, but then goes into pass protection.
- The receivers "sell" the running play by appearing to block at first, then break off into their pass routes.

== Use ==
Despite being one of the most effective kinds of plays, the play-action pass is not proportionately used. The belief is that a heavy running game must be maintained, but in fact even teams who heavily lean on passes have high success with the play-action.

== See also ==
- Flea-flicker — a type of play-action pass.
- Halfback option play — Like the play-action, but retains an option to actually run
- Draw play — the opposite of a play-action, where a pass play is faked when it is actually a run.
