= Bodychoke =

Noise rock band

- Genres: Noise rock; post-rock; industrial
- Years active: 1993–1999
- Labels: Freek, Relapse
- Past members: Kevin Tomkins; Paul Taylor

Bodychoke was an experimental noise rock band active between 1993 and 1999. A side project of power electronics band Sutcliffe Jugend, the band released four studio albums, most notably their debut Mindshaft (Freek Records) produced by British psychedelic dub musician Ott and Five Prostitutes which was produced by Steve Albini. Their music expressed themes of hate and disgust, as well as some of the sexual perversion and death tackled by Sutcliffe Jugend.

The band's style is hard to categorize, a combination of noise rock, post-rock, industrial music and even gothic rock elements. A typical Bodychoke song is driven along by a strong repetitive riff on the bass and drums, tensioned against layers of distorted guitar noise, with vocals ranging from bassy murmurs to deranged screaming. From 1996, cello featured as both a melodic and rhythmic element, and sometimes as a source of ambient sound-effects. The arrival of Manu Ros in 1998, who also drummed for the band Cranes, brought a more complex, "tribal" feel to the drumming.

== Members ==
- Kevin Tomkins – vocals, guitar
- Paul Taylor – vocals, guitar
- Gary Kean – bass guitar
- Mike Alexander – cello
- Manu Ros – drums (1998–1999)
- Jamie Hitchens – drums (1993–1998)

== Discography ==
=== Studio albums ===
- Mindshaft (1994), Freek Records
- Five Prostitutes (1996), Freek Records
- Cold River Songs (1998), Purity
- Completion (2004), 2nd Floor Mafia Productions
- Cold River Songs (remastered featuring bonus material) (2009), Relapse Records
