= Whole =

Whole may refer to:

== Music ==
- Whole note, or semibreve
- Whole step, or major second
- Whole (Jessa Anderson album) or the title song, 2014
- Whole (Soil album), 2013
- Whole, an EP by Pedro the Lion, 1997
- "Whole", a song by Basement from Colourmeinkindness, 2012
- "Whole", a song by Flaw from Through the Eyes, 2001
- "Whole", a song by Jacob Whitesides, 2019

== Other uses ==
- Whole (campaign), a British anti-stigma mental health campaign.
- WHOLE – United Queer Festival, a music festival held at Ferropolis, Gräfenhainichen, Germany.
- Whole (film), a 2003 American documentary by Melody Gilbert.
- Whole milk, milk which has not had fat removed.

== See also ==
- Holism, a philosophical and social theory
- Hole (disambiguation)
