= Totality =

Totality may refer to:

- In astronomy, the state or period of an eclipse when light from the eclipsed body is totally obscured:
  - The coverage of the sun during a solar eclipse
  - The period during which an eclipse is total
- In philosophy, the concepts of:
  - Absolute (philosophy) and everything
  - A phenomenon discussed in Totality and Infinity by Emmanuel Levinas
  - The concept of totality as proposed by György Lukács
- In politics, totalitarianism is sometimes referred to as regime of totality
- Totality Corporation, a former professional services provider acquired by Verizon
- Totality principle, a principle of common law re the sentencing of an offender for multiple offences
- Plan Totality, a U.S. wartime contingency plan from the early Cold War period
- The "Totality", a fictional alien entity in the Star Trek universe
- The mathematical concept of a function being total vs. partial
- Totality (album)
