= Bukovany (Benešov District) =

- Municipality
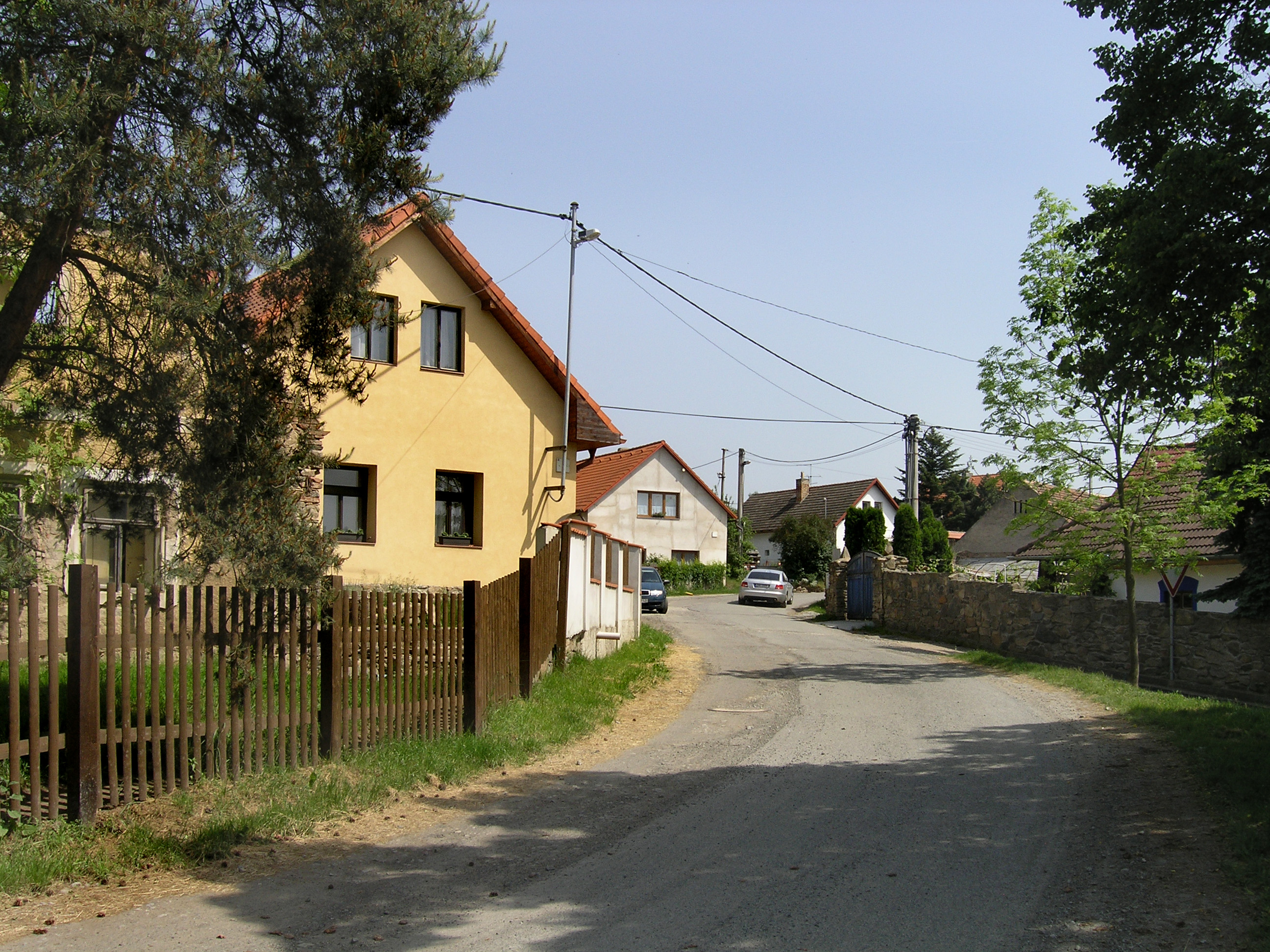
- Centre of Bukovany

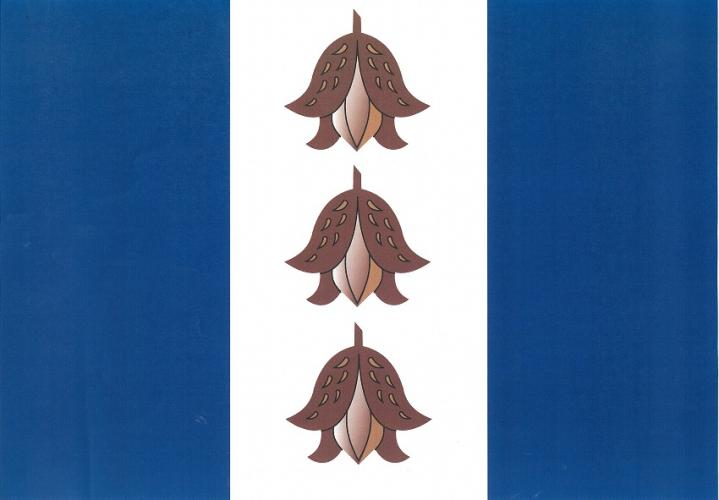
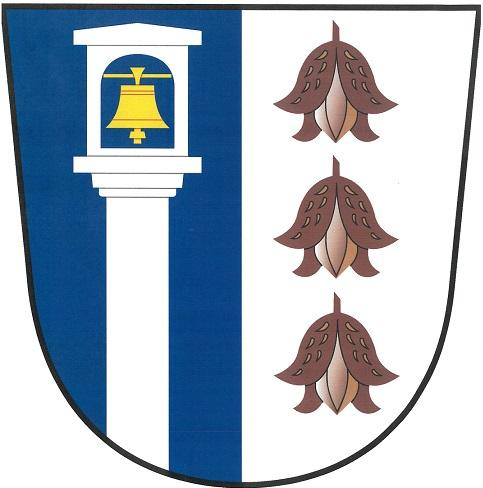
- Flag Coat of arms

- Location in the Czech Republic
- Coordinates: 49°49′22″N 14°37′28″E
- Country: Czech Republic
- Region: Central Bohemian
- District: Benešov
- First mentioned: 1318

Area
  - Total: 7.41 km^{2} (2.86 sq mi)
- Elevation: 327 m (1,073 ft)

Population (2026-01-01)
  - Total: 863
  - Density: 116/km^{2} (302/sq mi)
- Time zone: UTC+1 (CET)
  - Summer (DST): UTC+2 (CEST)
- Postal code: 257 41
- Website: www.obec-bukovany.cz

Bukovany is a municipality and village in Benešov District in the Central Bohemian Region of the Czech Republic. It has about 900 inhabitants.

== Etymology ==
The name is derived from the Czech word buk (i.e. 'beech'). Bukovany was a village of people who came here from a village near a beech forest called Bukov, Buková or Bukoví.

== Geography ==
Bukovany is located about 6 kilometres (4 mi) northeast of Benešov and 26 km (16 mi) south of Prague. It lies in the Benešov Uplands. The highest point is at 382 m (1,253 ft) above sea level. The Sázava River briefly flows along the northwestern municipal border.

== History ==
The first written mention of Bukovany is from 1318.

== Demographics ==
Historical population

Year	Pop.	±%
1869	378	—
1880	425	+12.4%
1890	481	+13.2%
1900	436	−9.4%
1910	544	+24.8%

Year	Pop.	±%
1921	511	−6.1%
1930	499	−2.3%
1950	638	+27.9%
1961	540	−15.4%
1970	641	+18.7%

Year	Pop.	±%
1980	564	−12.0%
1991	523	−7.3%
2001	597	+14.1%
2011	735	+23.1%
2021	753	+2.4%

Source: Censuses

== Transport ==
The railway line Prague–Čerčany runs through the municipal territory, but there is no train station. The municipality is served by the stop in neighbouring village of Pecerady.

== Sights ==
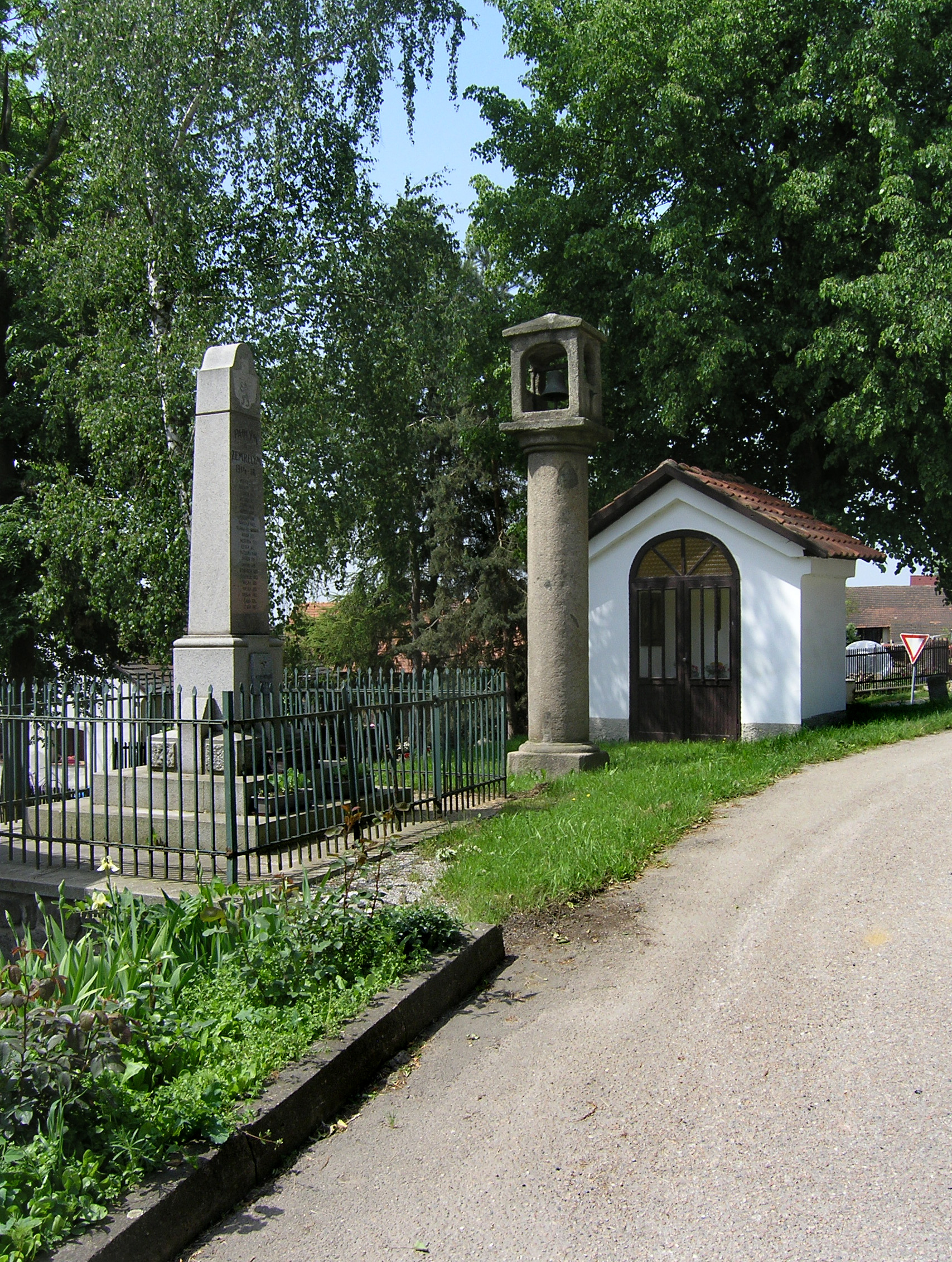
World War I memorial, belfry and chapel

There are no protected cultural monuments in the municipality. Among the landmarks of Bukovany are a World War I memorial, a belfry and a small chapel.
