= Bukovany (Hodonín District) =

- Municipality
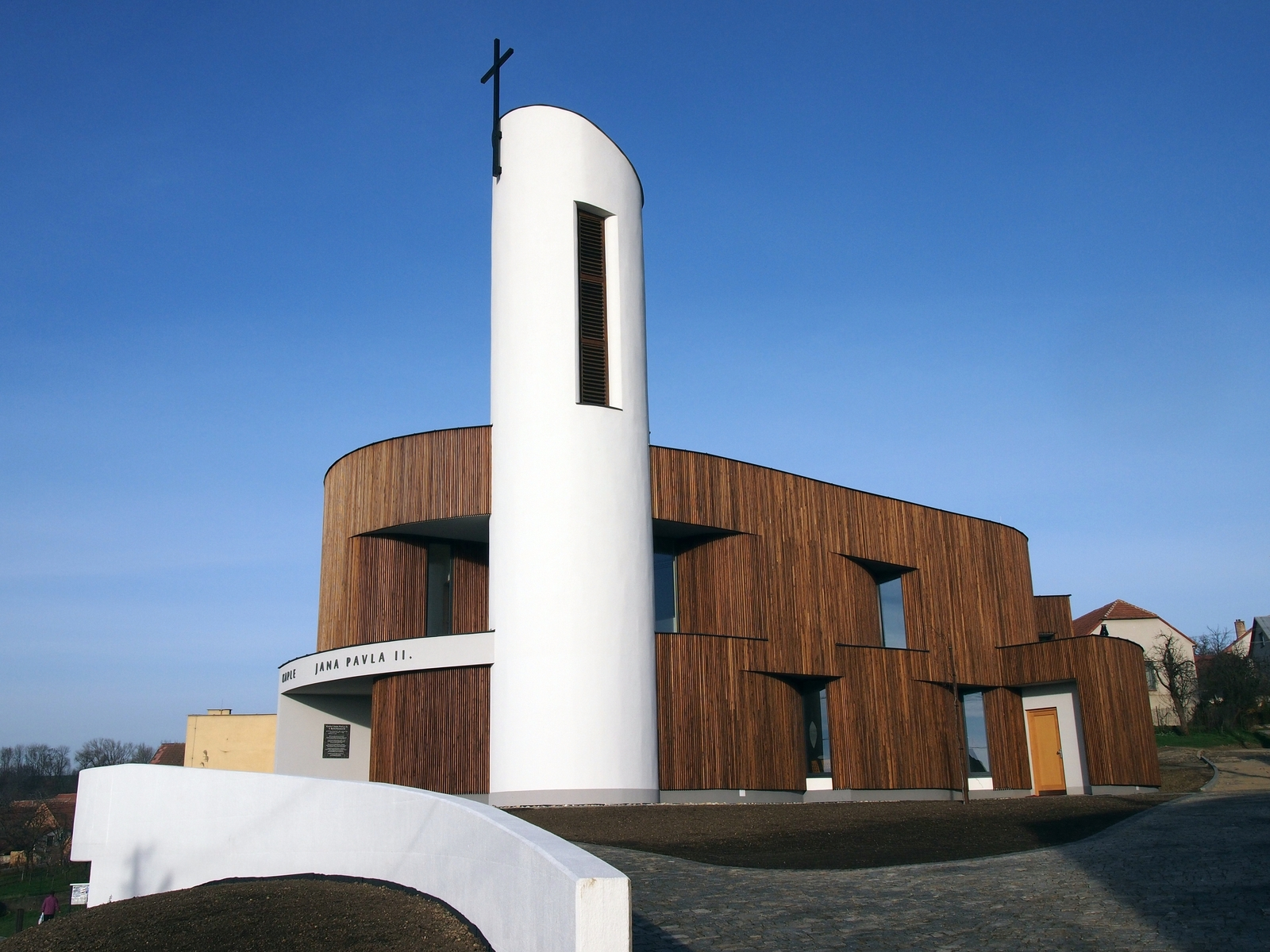
- Chapel of Saint John Paul II

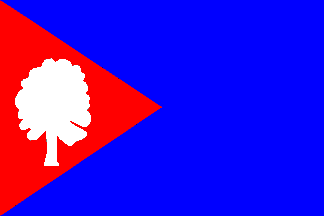
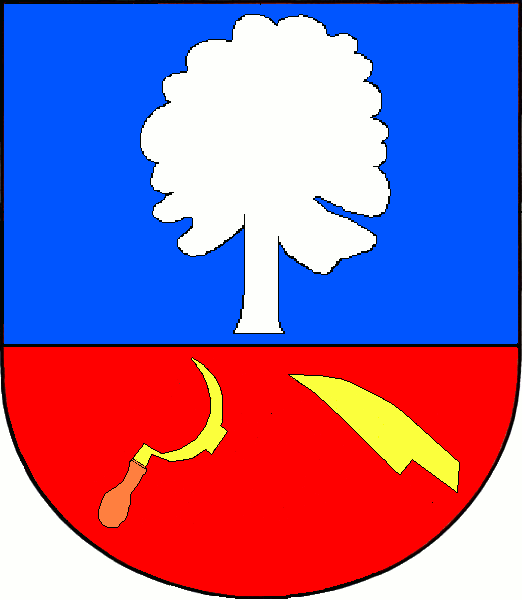
- Flag Coat of arms

- Location in the Czech Republic
- Coordinates: 49°2′32″N 17°6′3″E
- Country: Czech Republic
- Region: South Moravian
- District: Hodonín
- First mentioned: 1131

Area
  - Total: 3.29 km^{2} (1.27 sq mi)
- Elevation: 304 m (997 ft)

Population (2026-01-01)
  - Total: 683
  - Density: 208/km^{2} (538/sq mi)
- Time zone: UTC+1 (CET)
  - Summer (DST): UTC+2 (CEST)
- Postal code: 696 31
- Website: www.obecbukovany.cz

Bukovany is a municipality and village in Hodonín District in the South Moravian Region of the Czech Republic. It has about 700 inhabitants.

== History ==
The first written mention of Bukovany is from 1131.

== Demographics ==
Historical population
Year	Pop.	±%
1869	581	—
1880	625	+7.6%
1890	610	−2.4%
1900	699	+14.6%
1910	729	+4.3%
1921	718	−1.5%
1930	784	+9.2%
1950	725	−7.5%
1961	893	+23.2%
1970	871	−2.5%
1980	829	−4.8%
1991	776	−6.4%
2001	769	−0.9%
2011	740	−3.8%
2021	665	−10.1%
Source: Censuses
