= United States Golf Register =

USGR logo

The United States Golf Register is the United States's official historical registry of holes-in-one. The U.S. Golf Register is devoted to preserving history with each hole-in-one made, and recording the significance of the achievement as a historical record. There are no registration fees or dues associated with registering.
