= Reverse (American football) =

Trick play in American football

A reverse (sometimes referred to as an end reverse or criss cross) is a relatively common trick play in American football that involves one or more abrupt changes in the lateral flow of a rushing play.

== History ==
The invention of the reverse is credited to Amos Alonzo Stagg. The invention of the naked reverse, i. e. a reverse run to the weak side, is credited to Pop Warner.

== Variations ==
A classic reverse typically begins as a bootleg, sweep or end-around, but before the ball-carrier crosses the line of scrimmage he hands the ball off to a teammate, usually a wide receiver, running in the reverse (opposite) direction. Because many of the defensive players will have gravitated in the direction of the original rusher, if the second ball-carrier can outrun the defenders to the other side of the field, he has a very good chance to make a big gain.

A variation of this play is a double reverse, in which the second ball-carrier takes the ball all or part way back across the field before he too hands off to a teammate running in the opposite direction. This causes the flow of the play to "reverse" a second time. A double reverse adds another level of surprise to the defense; however, the play takes more time and space to develop and increases the risk of a big loss or a fumbled handoff.

Another variation is the reverse option. On a reverse option, the second ball-carrier runs for a few steps, then (optionally) passes the ball downfield to a teammate, similar to a halfback option play.

Many teams will also use the threat of a reverse to gain an advantage on simple sweep plays. In such a case, the quarterback might pitch the ball to the running back, who will fake a handoff or lateral to a teammate running in the opposite direction. The distraction is sometimes enough for the running back to gain an edge in getting past the defense.

== Terminology ==
Sometimes an end-around, in which the only handoff is from a stationary quarterback to a wide receiver, is imprecisely called a "reverse". An end-around is not a reverse because the lateral flow of the play does not change direction. However, it has become commonplace for fans, sportswriters, announcers, and even coaches and players to refer to any end-around as a 'reverse', and to an end-around reverse as a 'double reverse.'

== See also ==
- Football strategy
