= COMPLEAT (bioinformatics tool) =

Online bioinformatics tool

Protein Complex Enrichment Analysis Tool is an online bioinformatics tool used to analyze high-throughput datasets (or small-scale datasets) using protein complex enrichment analysis. The tool uses a protein complex resource as the back end annotation data instead of conventional gene ontology- or pathway-based annotations. The tool incorporates several useful features in order to provide a comprehensive data-mining environment, including network-based visualization and interactive querying options.

COMPLEAT may be used to analyze RNAi screens, proteomic datasets, gene expression data and any other high-throughput datasets where protein complex information is relevant.

== Applications ==
COMPLEAT has been successfully applied to identify:

- Dynamic protein complexes regulated by insulin and epidermal growth factors signaling, including a role of Brahma complex in the cellular response to insulin.
- Evolutionarily conserved molecular complexes that regulate nucleolar size when the complex constituents were targeted by RNA interference.
- Novel role of endocytosis and vesicle trafficking complexes in Hippo Signaling Pathway.
