= American football plays =

American football strategy

In American football, a play is a close-to-the-ground plan of action or strategy used to move the ball down the field. A play begins at either the snap from the center or at kickoff. Most commonly, plays occur at the snap during a down. These plays range from basic to very intricate. Football players keep a record of these plays in a playbook.

== Order of a play ==
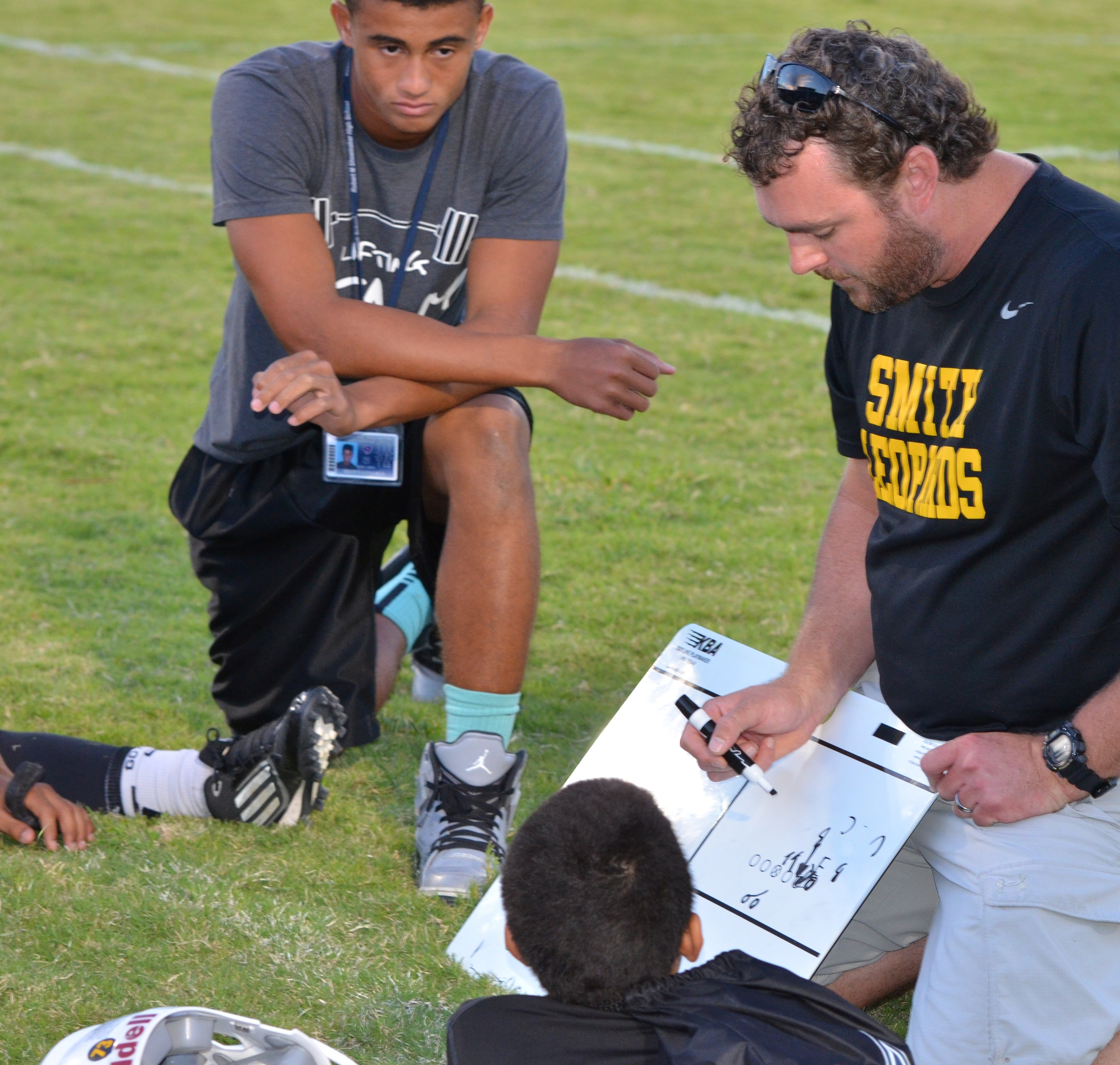
Drawing up a play.

A play begins in one of two ways:

- A play from scrimmage begins when the ball is delivered from the center to a back, usually the quarterback.
- A free kick

Once the play begins, it will continue until one of the following events happens:

- The ball carrier is down, usually defined as when any body part besides the hands and feet touches the ground.
- The ball carrier's forward progress is stopped to the point where a stalemate occurs and it is clear that the ball cannot be advanced any farther, nor is he easily going down as defined above.
- The ball carrier steps out of bounds.
- A forward pass touches the ground before it is caught (an incomplete pass). The ball touching the ground in other situations (called a fumble) does NOT end the play. In the case of a fumble, the play still continues until one of the above conditions is met.

When the play ends, the ball is set for the next play. For the first three instances above, the ball is set at the point of its maximum forward progress. That means that if a runner is driven back in the process of a tackle OR is ruled down by lack of forward progress, the ball is placed as close to his opponent's goal line as he had gotten before being driven back. If he runs backwards of his own volition, the ball is marked where he goes down. In the case of an incomplete pass, the ball is placed at the previous line of scrimmage.

Play then resumes as described above.

== Formation requirements ==
The offensive team must have seven players on the line of scrimmage at the start of a play. Those players may be positioned at any place along the line of scrimmage (which extends all of the way across the playing field).

The defensive team may position as many as 11 players on the line of scrimmage. Usually, there are from 3 to 8 defensive players on the line of scrimmage.

=== Formation types ===
There are several different types of formations, however, in modern football, formations can typically be classified into 4 categories:

- Singleback-
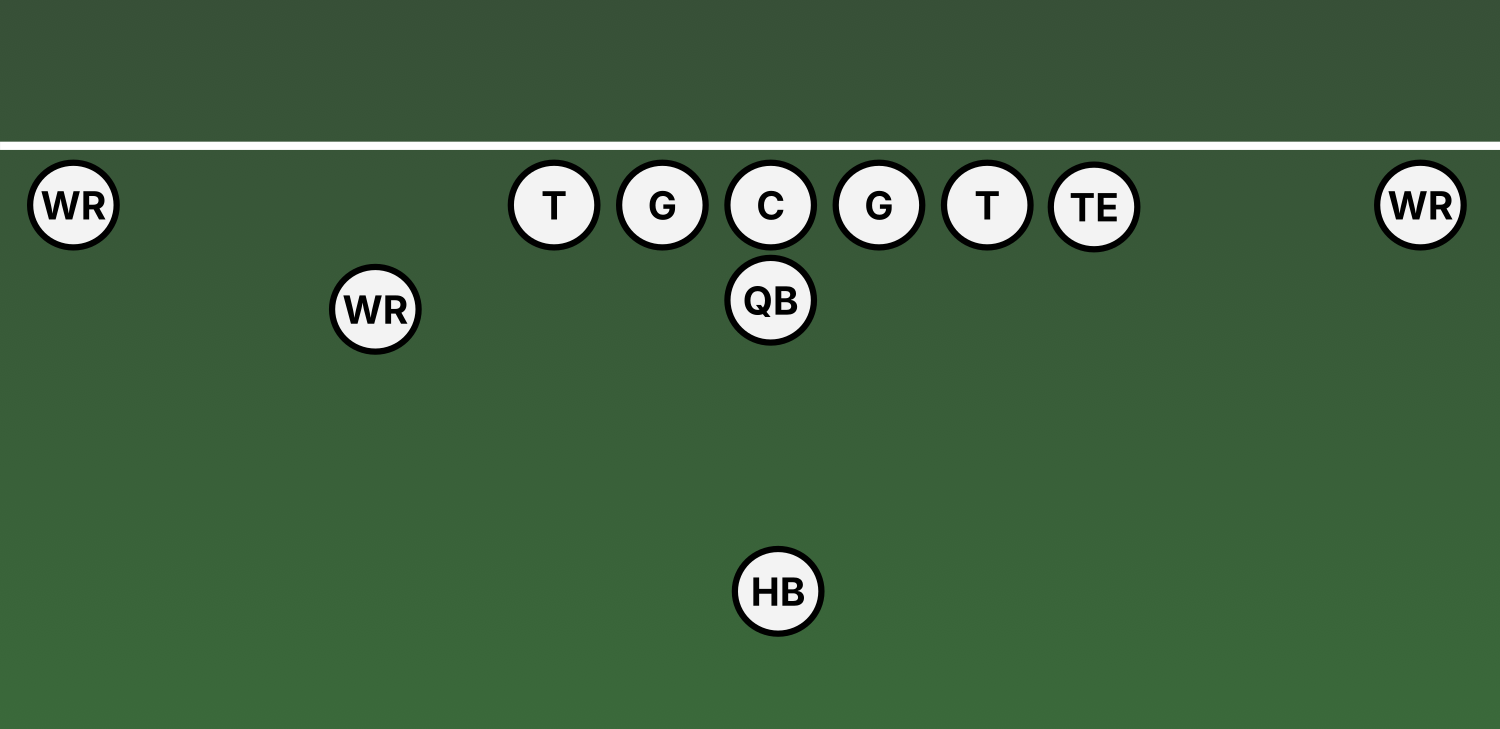
  Singleback formation
  A singleback formation, also called an “ace” and “lone setback”, is any formation where the quarterback lines up directly under center, with a lone running back lined up approximately 5 yards behind the line of scrimmage.
- Shotgun-
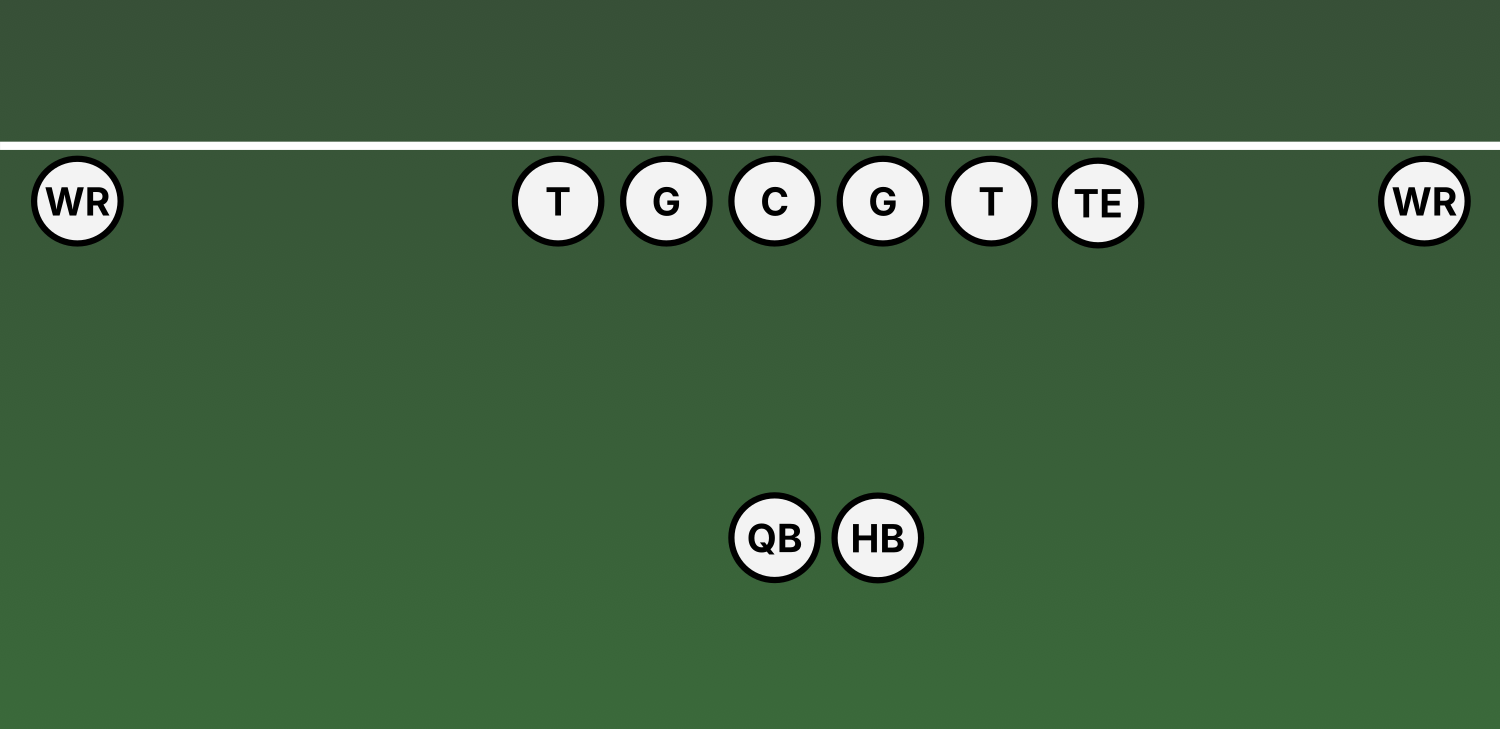
  Shotgun formation
  A shotgun formation is one of the most common formations in the modern game. The quarterback lines up 5-7 yards behind the line of scrimmage, typically with one or two halfbacks next to him. While it is often considered a passing formation, an increasing number of teams are building their offenses around shotgun formations and running several types of plays from them.
- Pistol-
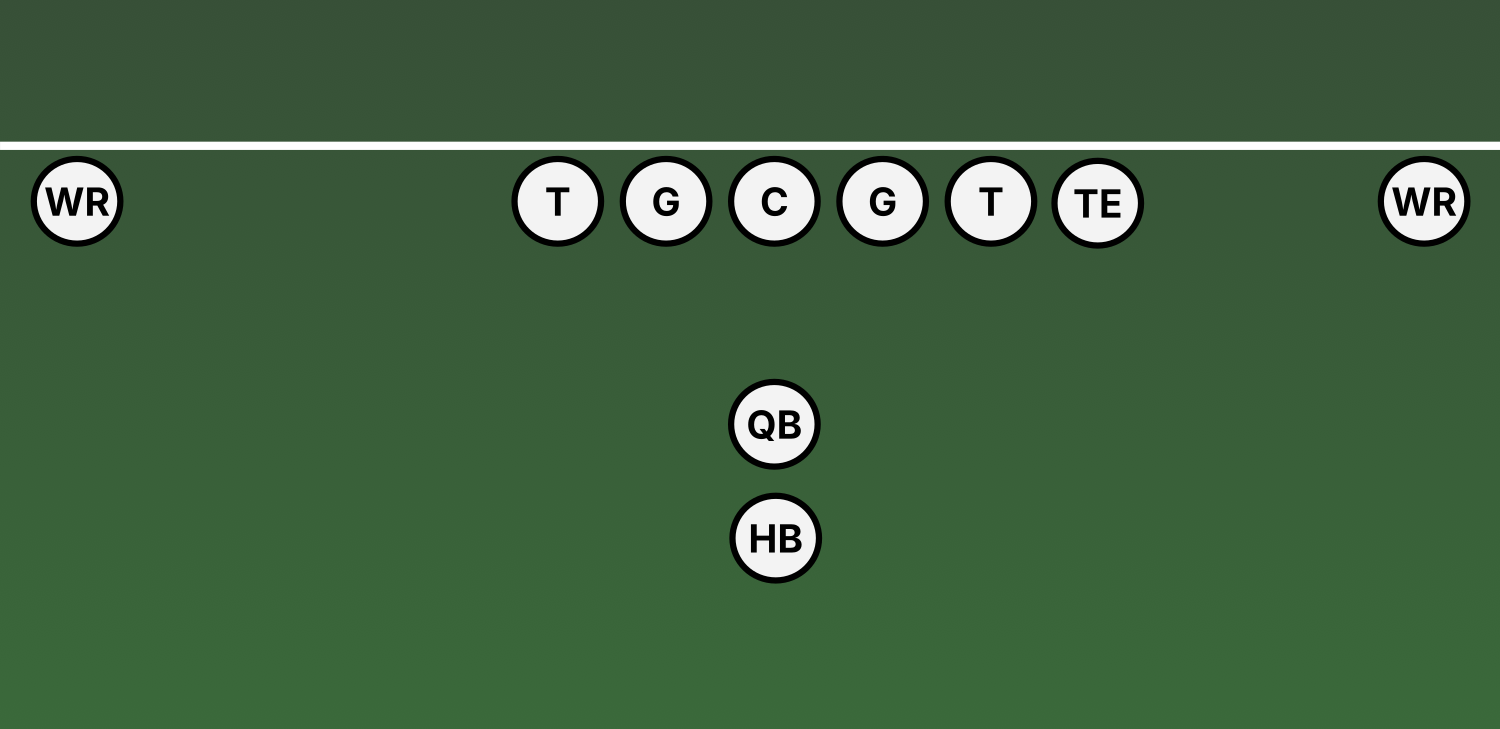
  Pistol formation
  A pistol formation is a hybrid of the singleback and shotgun formations. The quarterback lines up about 4 yards behind the line of scrimmage, closer than a shotgun formation. Meanwhile, the halfback lines up behind the quarterback instead of next to him.
- I-Formation-
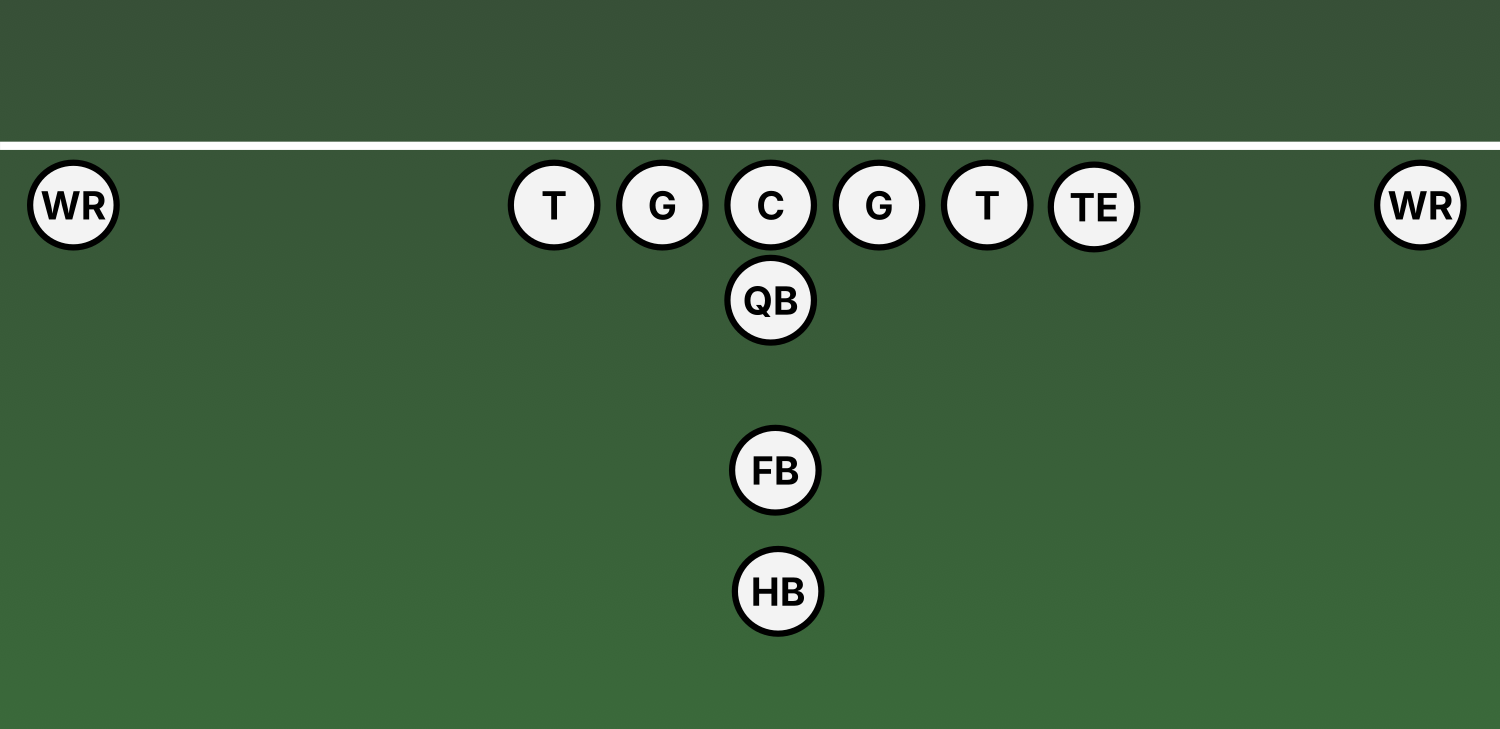
  I-Formation
  Another one of the most common formations in modern football. The quarterback lines up directly under center, but rather than having a single set back, a fullback lines up behind the quarterback and a halfback lines up behind the fullback. The name I formation comes from the vertical alignment of the quarterback, fullback, and halfback, especially when compared to a T formation, which is now extremely rare at all levels of modern football.

== Offensive plays ==
=== Offensive terminology ===
- run block -- An active type of blocking, where the player steps forward in an attempt to push a defensive player out of the path of the ball carrier.
- pass block-- A passive type of blocking, where the player steps backward to establish a pocket around the quarterback to give the quarterback a chance to pass.
- lead block-- A situation where one player precedes the ball carrier along his intended path in order to clear any defensive players that have not already been blocked.
- pull -- When a member of the offensive line takes a step back from his usual place in a line and moves laterally in order to block somewhere else. Pulling can be done on pass and run plays.
- pocket -- The protected area around a quarterback established by the offensive line in order to give him adequate time and sight lines in order to complete a pass.
- gap -- A space between blockers. Defenders can shoot the gap.
- hole -- A space in the line where a ball carrier aims on a running play. These can be predesignated holes defined by the spacing between players before the snap, or they can be established by moving players around and establishing the holes after the snap (in a play called run-to-daylight).
- snap The act of the center passing the ball from a resting position on the ground to a player behind the line of scrimmage, usually (but not always) the quarterback.
- pass -- Also called a forward pass. A ball that leaves a player's hand and moves towards the opponents goal line.
- lateral -- Also called a backward pass, pitch, or pitch-out based on the technique a quarterback uses to pass the ball. A ball that leaves a player's hand and moves parallel to or away from the opponent's goal line.
- handoff -- A ball that is handed directly from one player to another without leaving the first player's hands first.

=== Running plays ===
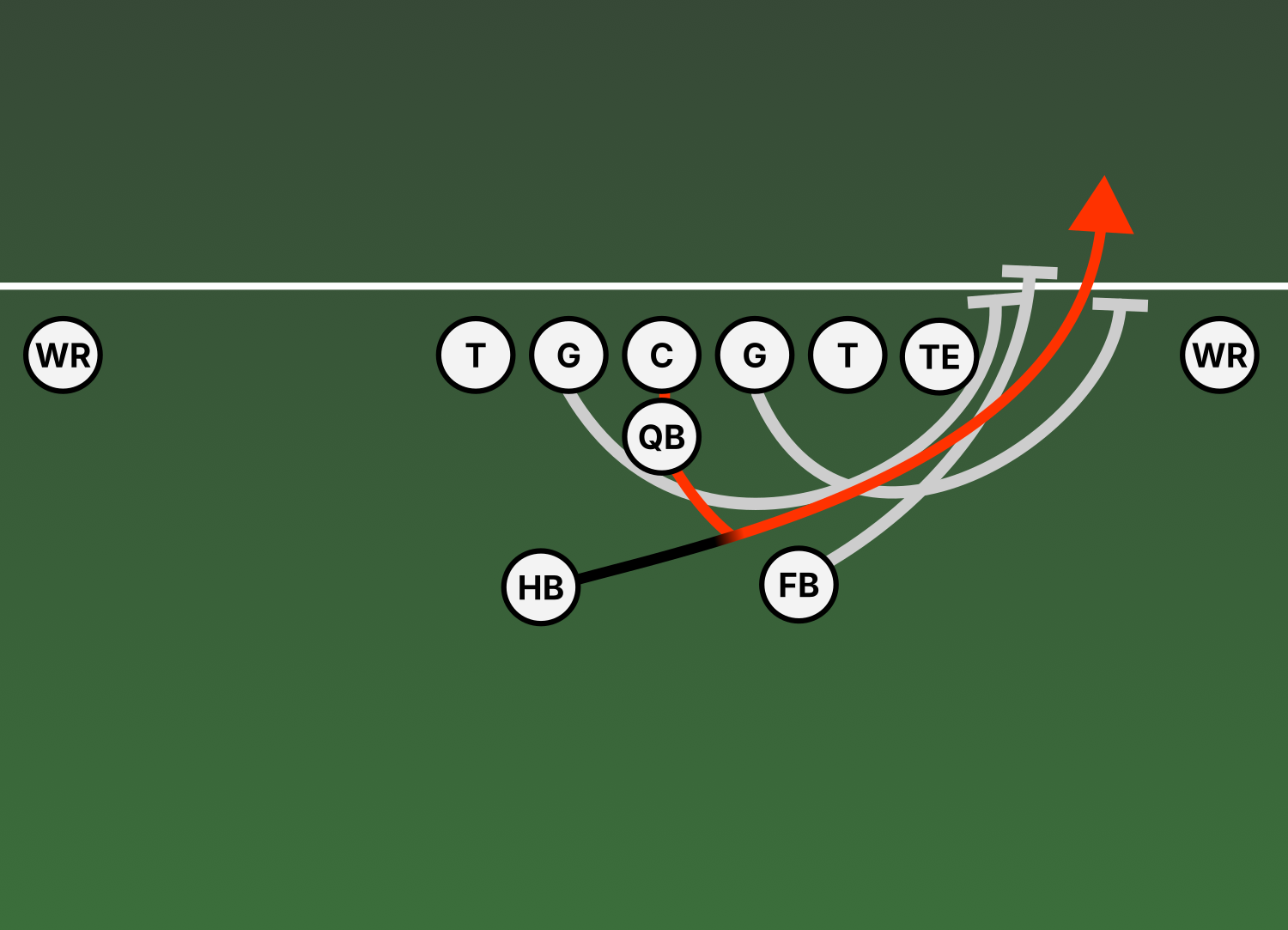
A 'Buck Sweep, an example of a running play involving a handoff.

In a running play, the ball is advanced beyond the line of scrimmage by a player who receives it from behind the line of scrimmage. The player advancing the ball can be:

- the player (usually the quarterback) who receives the ball from the center,

or

- any further player to receive the ball via handoff or lateral. Any number of handoffs or laterals can occur on any play at any time.

==== Up the middle ====
Also called dive, plunge, buck, gut, slam or numerous other names. The most basic run play is a run up the middle. In this case, the ball is handed off from the quarterback to a running back. The back then aims for a predetermined hole between his offensive linemen. This hole can be either between center and guard or between guard and tackle. The offensive line will run block, pushing defenders away from the chosen hole. Often, the fullback will lead block through the hole first to clear a path for the half back or running back.

- In a run up the middle, the running back will aim for one of the A or B gaps:

       W      T  G  C  G  T  E
               ^^ ^^ ^^ ^^            W

==== Iso ====
Also called a Halfback Lead, this is one of the most basic power runs in football. It is designed to isolate the fullback on a block with a linebacker, giving the halfback an easy 5 yard gain. Meanwhile, the other linebackers are blocked on combo blocks from the offensive line. Because it requires a fullback, it is usually run out of I-formations, however there are several variants of the play that can be run in other formations.

==== Off tackle ====
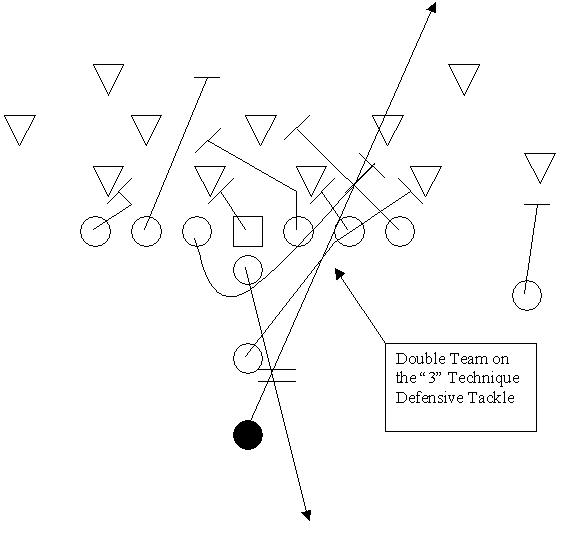
Off Tackle play.

The 'bread-and-butter' of a run-oriented offense, this is typically the most common run play. Rather than aiming for a hole in the line, the running back aims for the spot just outside the tackle. This type of play allows for more improvisation by the running back once he is past the line, since there is often more open field in this area than in any run up the middle.

==== Toss ====
In a toss play, the RB "curves out" toward the sideline on either side and the QB pitches ("tosses") the ball to the RB.

==== Sweep ====
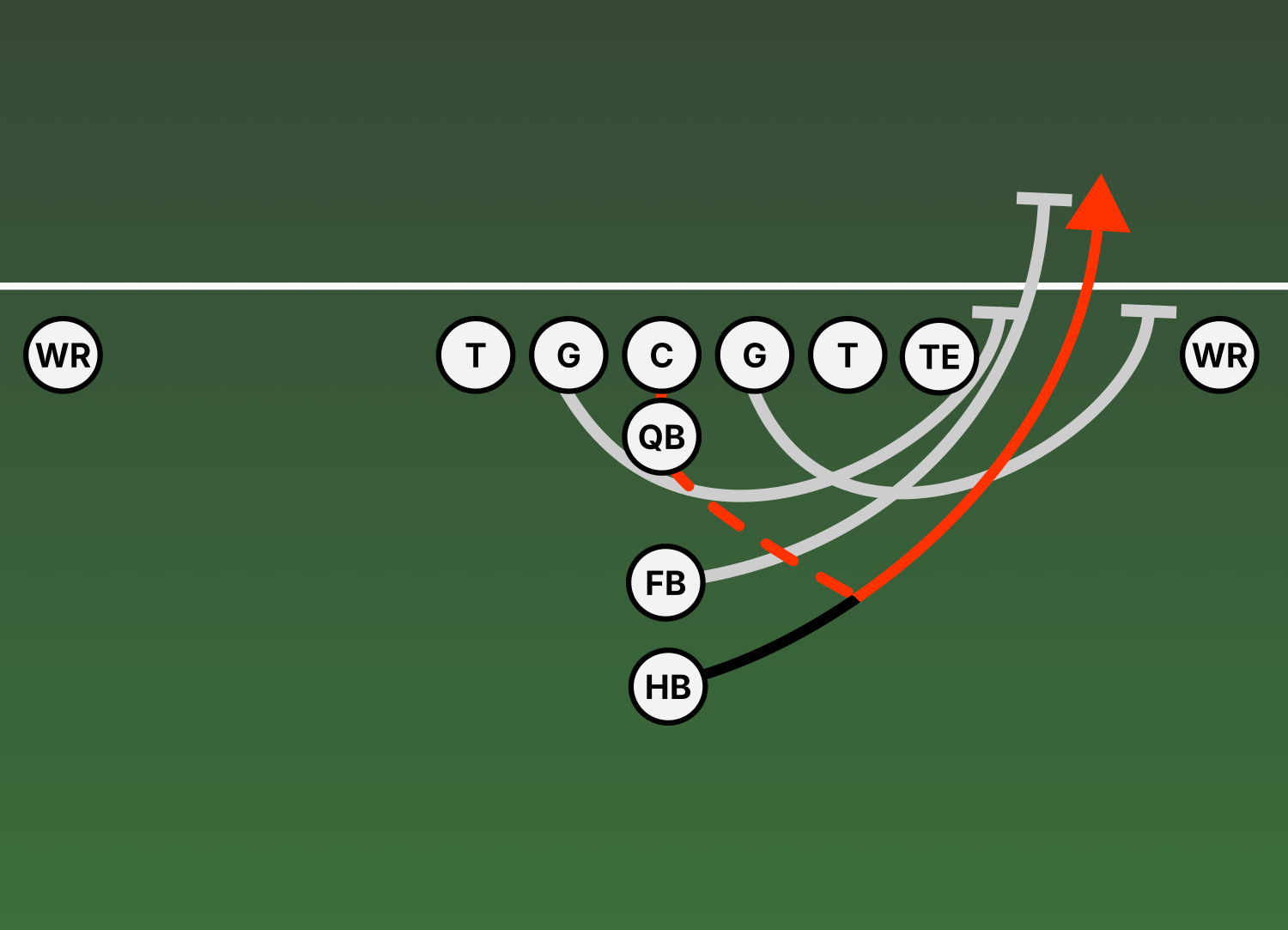
A fullback sweep play

In a sweep play, the fullback begins by running towards the sideline before heading forward. This motion allows for some of the offensive linemen, often one or both guards, to pull from their normal positions and establish a lane for the running back to run through. A lead blocking fullback often leads him through the lane. This play, known as the Packers sweep, was the central play in Vince Lombardi's "run-to-daylight" offense that was so successful for the Green Bay Packers of the 1960s.

==== Trap ====
In a trap, a guard on the back side of the play (away from the direction the fullback or running back is heading) will pull and lead block for the running back (most of the time, the guard will blindside an unblocked down linemen, and kick him out of the play). Often, the fullback will take the place of the guard, and block the opening allowed by this.

- Trap blocking for a run through the 3-hole between the guard and tackle (In some numbering schemes, the left and right sides are reversed, and this would be the 2-hole instead). The running back will follow the guard through the hole.

                         _
              _     _  _ | _  _
              |     |  | | |  |
       W      T  G  C  G | T  E
                 |_______|           W

==== Counter ====
Also called a misdirection. In this play, the runner begins by taking a step or two away from his intended path, then doubling back and heading in the opposite direction. Often defenders are clueing on the first move of the running back. The defenders committed to the first step, but the play moves in the opposite direction.

Counter plays are often (but not always) coupled with influence blocking, where the offensive line blocks the defense towards (rather than away from) the intended direction of the play. This gambit often causes the defenders to think the play is going in the opposite direction, and they react as such.

==== Draw ====
Also called a delay. In a draw play, the offensive line drops into pass blocking positions, and the quarterback takes a drop as though he were going to pass. He then hands the ball off to his running back (or keeps it himself) and runs forward past the rushing defenders. The idea is that the defenders will be tricked in advancing on the quarterback as though it were a pass play, and this will vacate the area just beyond the line of scrimmage for the runner to take advantage of.

==== Bootleg ====
The quarterback fakes a handoff to the running back and continues running with the ball opposite from the direction the running back was headed. The bootleg can have blockers similar to a sweep (and in such cases is it often called a quarterback sweep) or it can be run naked, that is without any blockers at all. A naked bootleg relies on the defense buying the fake handoff and moving to tackle the running back rather than the quarterback.

==== Quarterback sneak ====
The quarterback takes the snap and immediately dives to one side of the center or the other. This is often a short yardage play designed when only a yard or so is needed for a first down or a touchdown. Often the only players on either side of the ball that know the play is coming are the quarterback and the center (hence the sneak aspect of it), as the play is often decided by the quarterback upon seeing the defense. The play is often called by a silent signal between quarterback and center (a pinch or a tap in the direction the sneak is headed).

==== End-around ====
The wide receiver takes a handoff directly from the quarterback. The receiver then may proceed to do one of two things: he either runs the ball towards the line of scrimmage in order to gain yardage, or more rarely, he attempts to pass to another eligible pass receiver.

==== Reverse ====
This play resembles a sweep, but before the running back crosses the line of scrimmage, he hands the ball off to a wide receiver going in the reverse (opposite) direction of where the running back was going. If the defense was drawn to the side of the field the running back was going towards, the receiver can outrun the defense to the other side of the field and make a big gain. When run like this, it is generally considered a trick play. However, it can also be run by putting a receiver in motion while the quarterback is under center, with the quarterback pitching the ball to the receiver behind him.

==== Option ====
An option play is a play in which the quarterback holds the ball and runs to either side of the offensive line, waiting for an opportunity to run upfield and advance the ball. At the same time, the running back follows, allowing the quarterback the 'option' of pitching the ball just before he is tackled. This tactic forces defensive players to commit to either preventing the pitch or tackling the quarterback, allowing the offensive team to choose the best result.

The option play requires a very fast and mobile quarterback to execute it, and employs a considerable deal of risk, because if the pitch is mishandled it is a live ball that can be recovered by the defense, plus the quarterback can be hurt.

The option is rarely seen outside of college football, as high school teams lack the skill to execute it properly, and defensive players on professional teams are quick enough to disrupt the play to the point that it doesn't merit the risk involved, until the increased usages of read-option and RPO offenses in NFL since the 2010s with increasing number of dual-threat quarterbacks.

College football teams West Virginia, Air Force, Florida in 2000s often employ this play style.

A common form of the option executed on the high school, collegiate, and occasionally professional levels is the veer.

=== Passing plays ===
==== Go ====
A go, seam or fly route is a deep route used typically when the receiver has a speed advantage over the defensive back. In the route, the receiver will run as fast as possible in straight line parallel to the sideline, in an attempt to outrun the defender who is covering them.

==== Post ====
A post is a deep play where wide receivers run straight down the field a short distance (10-15 yards), and then angle in toward the center of the field (toward the goal 'posts') where the ball is caught at high speed. When this play was originally designed, the goal posts were on the "zero" yard line, in the front of the endzone - thus, a cornerback in man coverage would be led into the post. In a skinny post, the route is shorter and quicker than a deep post, which may cover 30 or 40 yards. This may also be referred to as a "glance in" or a "bang eight."

==== Out ====
An out route will usually feature the receiver running 7 to 10 yards downfield and then making a 90 degree turn towards the sideline.-.

==== In/drag/dig ====
The in, drag, or dig route is the opposite of the Out route. As its name suggests, the route will usually feature the receiver running 7 to 10 yards downfield and then making a 90 degree turn towards the center of the field.

==== Slant ====
A slant is where a receiver will run straight, (5-8 yards) then take a hard turn left/right.

==== Hook/hitch ====
An eligible receiver runs a predetermined number of steps or yards upfield before stopping and turning back in slightly to face the quarterback, in the hopes that the defender cannot react and disrupt the pass before positive yardage

==== Arrow ====
A flat route is named after the area of the field where it takes place. During a typical play, due to the routes of other receivers, there is an area of the field that is vacated. This area known as the "flats" is typically from the hash marks to the sideline and from the line of scrimmage to 3-5 yards downfield. The route itself may be executed several ways. The most common is also known as the arrow. This consists of a receiver lining up near the offensive tackle and then taking a short angled path directly to this area. Running backs often will execute a special flat route that involves them running toward the sideline without the ball from the backfield and then turning upfield as a receiver. This is often referred to as a swing route.

==== Option routes ====
Particularly in the highest levels of competition (professional and major college), a play may call for the receiver to 'read' the defensive coverage against him, and run a second route if the first option would be ineffectual. As an example, the receiver may be instructed to begin with a slant route, but if the defender has that covered, switch to an out route. For this to work correctly, the passer must make the same read as the receiver.

==== Screen pass ====
A screen pass is a pass that is normally thrown to a receiver or running back behind the line of scrimmage. It is thrown behind the line of scrimmage so that the pulling linemen can get their blocks established. There is another screen called a bubble screen where there are 3 receivers bunched together to one side, and after the snap the ball is almost instantly thrown to the one farthest behind the line of scrimmage.

==== Play-action ====
The quarterback takes the snap and drops back to fake a handoff to the running back. The quarterback then rapidly pulls the ball back from the faked handoff, trying to hide it from the defense. The running back continues to move upfield as if he has the ball in his hands. The offensive line starts to run block, but then quickly goes into pass protection. The receivers appear to block at first, then go into their routes.

On a play-action pass, which is essentially the opposite of the draw play, the quarterback hopes to fake the defenders into thinking the offense is going to run the ball. The effects of this play is to slow down the pass rush of the defense and it forces the defensive backs to make a decision between covering a receiver or coming up to help stop the run.

=== Trick/gadget plays ===
Trick/gadget plays are plays that are designed to appear to be one type of play while in reality is another. These plays typically will catch defenses off guard. The most common example is the reverse play. Other examples of trick plays are the Halfback Pass or Razzle Dazzle (Where the running back will pretend to run the ball, but instead throws it to a receiver down field), the Flea flicker (The quarterback hands the ball off to the running back who in turns pitches it back to the quarterback who then throws it to a receiver down field), the Hook and Ladder, also known as the Hook and Lateral (One receiver runs a hook route and upon catching the ball, laterals it to another teammate as he passes him running down the field), and the double pass, where the quarterback throws a lateral to one player, who then throws a forward pass downfield. A notable example of a trick play is the touchdown pass from wide receiver Antwaan Randle El to Hines Ward (Steelers) in Super Bowl XL. The Seahawks' Jon Ryan threw a touchdown to Garry Gilliam in the 2014 NFC Championship Game.

== Defensive plays ==
=== Rush ===
A pass rush (or, colloquially, 'pressure,' e.g., "Chicago really brought the pressure on that last play") occurs when the defense reads a pass play and elects to rush some combination of linemen (either 3 or 4 linemen in typical 3-4 or 4-3 schemes), in an effort to affect the pass that the opposing quarterback is attempting to complete. Perhaps the most obvious and tangible result of a successful pass rush is the sack, but even when the quarterback is not sacked, "hurries" and "knockdowns" are also important, as they also serve to disrupt in some manner the pass attempt. A "hurry" occurs when the quarterback is still able to make a throw, but is forced to throw before he would ideally like (e.g., before all of his receivers have completed running their routes). A "knockdown" occurs when the quarterback is still able to make a throw, but is knocked to the ground immediately upon making his throw because the rushing linemen were so close to him. Knockdowns and hurries can also serve to force the quarterback into making bad decisions, which could possibly result in interceptions for the defense.

=== Stunts ===
Stunts are a special means of rushing the quarterback done to confuse the opposing team's offensive line. Properly executing a stunt requires two or more defensive lineman working together. One defensive lineman will take an angled path towards an offensive lineman that he is not lined up across from. This will usually cause the offensive lineman he is lined up across from to follow him while also occupying the offensive lineman he angled towards. In turn, the defensive lineman who would have been blocked by the offensive lineman that is being angled to will loop behind his teammate and rush through the gap that was created by the offensive lineman who followed the defensive lineman taking the angle.

 E  T | G C  G  T      W
 /  |  \|      \
/   |  /        \
 DE   |NT    DL   DE
      |______|

=== Blitz ===
A blitz occurs when the defense sends non defensive-line personnel (either linebackers or defensive backs) to rush the quarterback. A blitz is an expansion upon the effective concept of the aforementioned pass rush.

=== More plays ===
In attempting to halt the advancing of the football by the offensive team, the defensive team has many options. There are various formations that are commonly employed to defend against a passing attack.

==== Man-to-man ====
Man-to-man coverage is when every receiver is covered by a defensive back or linebacker. It is a coverage often used while blitzing because there are not enough players available to effectively execute zone coverage. Man-to-man coverage may be used while not blitzing by teams who have superior defensive backs or against teams with inferior receivers.

A "shut-down back" is a superior defensive back who does not need the assistance of another team-mate to cover a receiver. Football coaches value him because they may assign other tasks (for example, blitzing) to his team-mates.

==== Zone ====
Zone defense is when defensive players (typically defensive backs and linebackers) are responsible for a specific area on the field during pass coverage. Zones are usually more effective against long passes. When playing in a zone defense, a defensive player is able to observe what the quarterback is attempting to do, anticipate where a pass may be thrown, and perhaps intercept the pass. Zone defenses tend to produce interceptions of passes or outstanding collisions with receivers after they have made pass receptions.
