= Holeš =

Holeš (Slovak/Czech feminine: Holešová), anglicized as Holes, is a Czech and Slovak surname. Notable people include:

- Július Holeš (1939–2021), Slovak footballer
- Mária Holešová (born 1993), Slovak handballer
- Paul Holes (born 1968), American investigator
- Tomáš Holeš (born 1993), Czech footballer
