= Gap (gridiron football) =

Spaces between offensive linemen

A basic I formation with gaps labeled.

Gaps in gridiron football are the spaces in between the splits of the offensive linemen. A hole is a space in between the defensive linemen.

== Gap naming and defensive line positioning ==
=== Gap names ===
The gaps on either side of the offensive center and between the guards are called "A" gaps. A gap between the offensive guard and tackle is called a "B" gap. The gaps outside the offensive tackle are called "C" gaps. If there is a tight end, the gap outside the tight end and opposite the tackle is a "D" gap.

=== Defensive line positioning ===
Line positioning is described by numbers, from 0 to 9. Even numbers are face to face with offensive players, odd numbers are to the side (on the shoulder) of opposing players. If a defensive lineman is face to face with an offensive center, he is said to be in a 0 technique. If he is face to face with a guard, the defender is in a 2 technique. If the defender is face to face with a tackle, he is in a 4 technique. If the defender is aligned directly across from a tight end, it is described as a 6 technique.

==== Shade technique ====
Numbers are also used to describe when players are aligned not directly on a player, but aligned with the shoulders of a blocker. This kind of alignment is often called a shade. To be aligned on the shoulders of a center is called a 1 technique. To be aligned on the inside shoulder of a guard is a 2i technique. To be aligned on the outside shoulder of a guard is a 3 technique. To be aligned on the inside of a tackle is a 4i technique. And to be aligned on the outside shoulder of a tackle is a 5 technique. Assignments of 7 and 9 are not universal, but a 7 can mean a player on the inside shoulder of a tight end, and a 9 technique is usually a couple feet on the outside away from any blocker.

== One-gap line play versus two-gap line play ==
In a one-gap defensive line technique, a player is assigned a single gap to defend against the run. He does not have to line up in the gap, but he does have to be able to shed any blocker attempting to keep him from defending the gap. In a two-gap defensive technique, the defensive lineman generally has to control or defeat the offensive player in front of him to guard the run on both gaps that flank the offensive player.

The gap defensive technique is older than the use of the term. In Jones and Wilkinson, when describing the nose guard play in their 5-2 defense, the authors warn that the guard must never allow the center to cut you either way (i.e. two-gap technique). All other defensive linemen are only asked to prevent their opposing linemen from blocking them in one-gap play, but they do not use the phrase 'gap' in their text.

== Shoot the gap ==
Shooting the gap is a term used in American football. To "shoot the gap", a defensive lineman will exploit the space between the offensive linemen during a pass rush. The defensive lineman is usually one of the defensive tackles. The gaps are given different letters depending on their distance from the center. The gaps between the center and the guard are known as the "A gaps", and the gaps between the guard and the tackle are known as the "B gaps". Shooting the gap requires the defensive lineman to turn his shoulders and get past the offensive line into the backfield by any means possible, usually by diving through the gap. The play is often used during a blitz, as the defense will try to rush past the offensive line in order to get to the quarterback and cause a quarterback sack.
