= Bukovany (Olomouc District) =

- Municipality
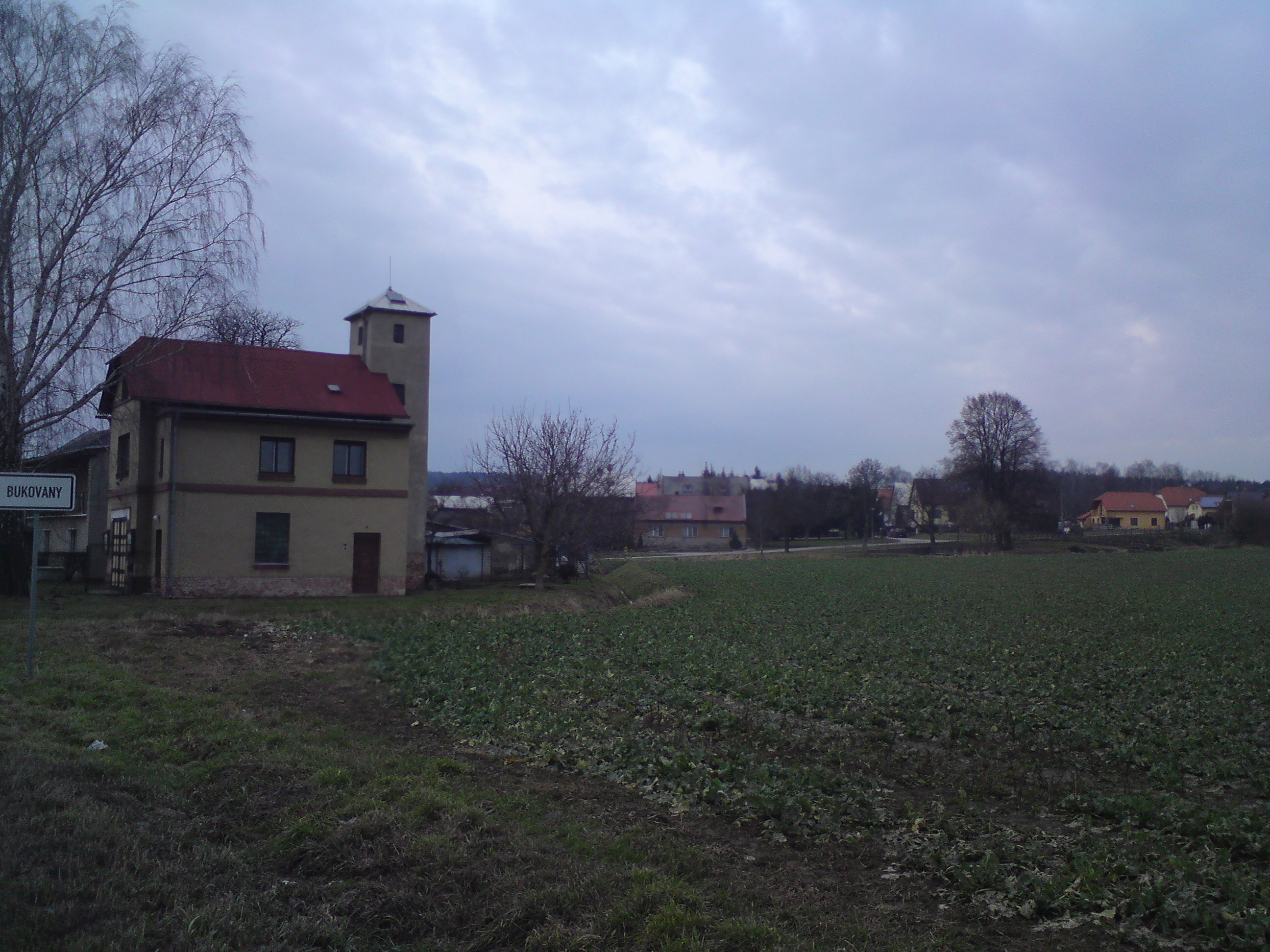
- View from the southeast

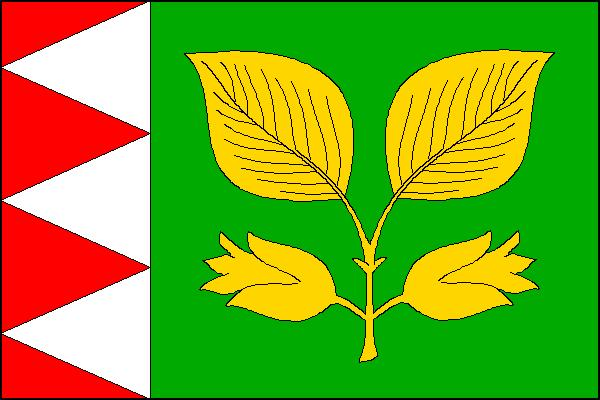
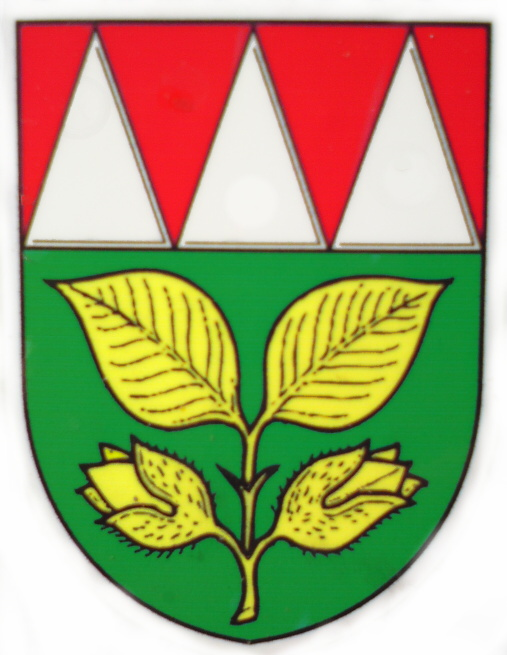
- Flag Coat of arms

- Location in the Czech Republic
- Coordinates: 49°36′19″N 17°20′37″E
- Country: Czech Republic
- Region: Olomouc
- District: Olomouc
- First mentioned: 1131

Area
  - Total: 3.16 km^{2} (1.22 sq mi)
- Elevation: 263 m (863 ft)

Population (2026-01-01)
  - Total: 680
  - Density: 220/km^{2} (560/sq mi)
- Time zone: UTC+1 (CET)
  - Summer (DST): UTC+2 (CEST)
- Postal code: 779 00
- Website: www.bukovany.cz

Bukovany is a municipality and village in Olomouc District in the Olomouc Region of the Czech Republic. It has about 700 inhabitants.

Bukovany lies approximately 7 kilometres (4 mi) east of Olomouc and 217 km (135 mi) east of Prague.

== Demographics ==
Historical population
Year	Pop.	±%
1869	368	—
1880	429	+16.6%
1890	440	+2.6%
1900	466	+5.9%
1910	428	−8.2%
1921	437	+2.1%
1930	444	+1.6%
1950	370	−16.7%
1961	369	−0.3%
1970	401	+8.7%
1980	354	−11.7%
1991	354	+0.0%
2001	413	+16.7%
2011	608	+47.2%
2021	640	+5.3%
Source: Censuses
