= Hole (gridiron football) =

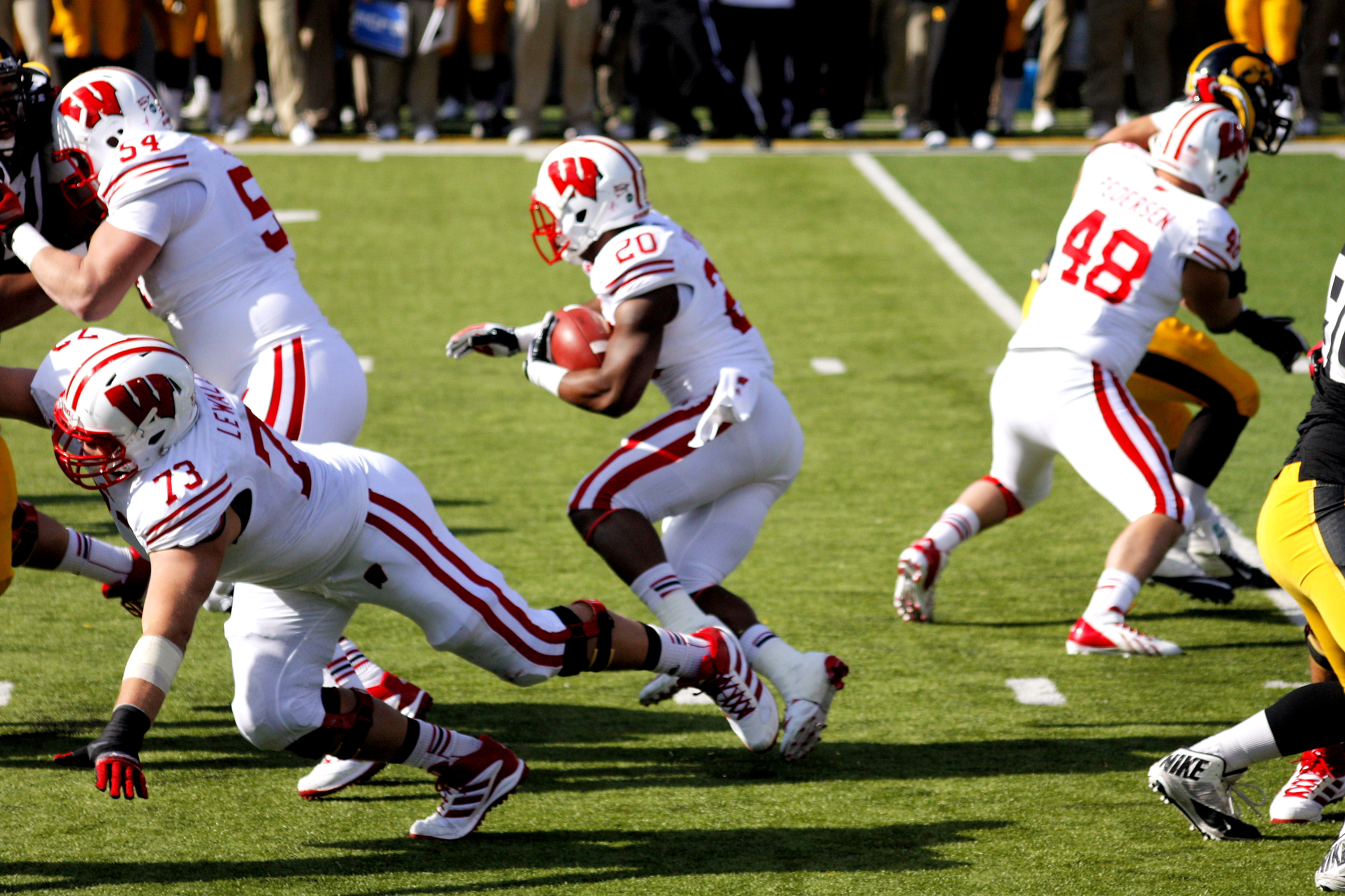
A running back hits the hole.

A hole in gridiron football is a space in between the defensive linemen, through which the running back aims to run. It is also known as a running lane. These can be predesignated holes defined by the spacing between players before the snap, or they can be established by moving players around and establishing the holes after the snap (in a play called a run-to-daylight). The defense's holes are contrasted with the offense's gaps.
