= Jump shift =

American football shift maneuver

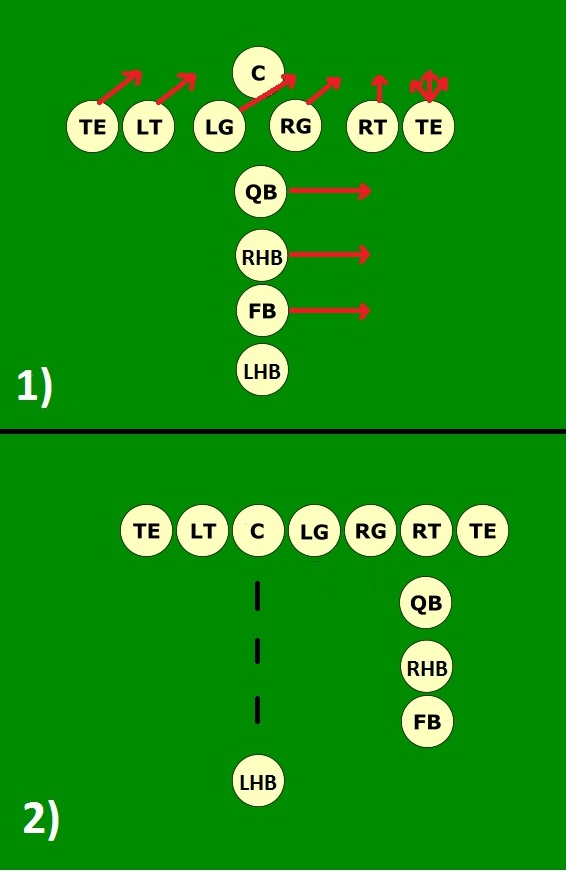
Diagram of the Heisman shift.

The jump shift, or Heisman shift, was an American football shift maneuver utilized by John Heisman. In this system, only the center was on the line of scrimmage, and the backfield would be in a line, as one would in an I-formation with an extra halfback at the hind end, or a giant T. The players could shift into various formations. In one version, the line shifted so that the center was between guard and tackle, and the three backs nearest the line of scrimmage would shift all to one side. A split second elapsed, then the ball was snapped and the wall of three blockers charged on. If needed, the center could also snap it to one of the other backs. The phalanx of blockers resembled the yet-to-be developed single wing. The Heisman shift was considered more complicated than its predecessors (say the Minnesota shift).
