= Hard count =

Audible, irregularly cadenced count by a quarterback

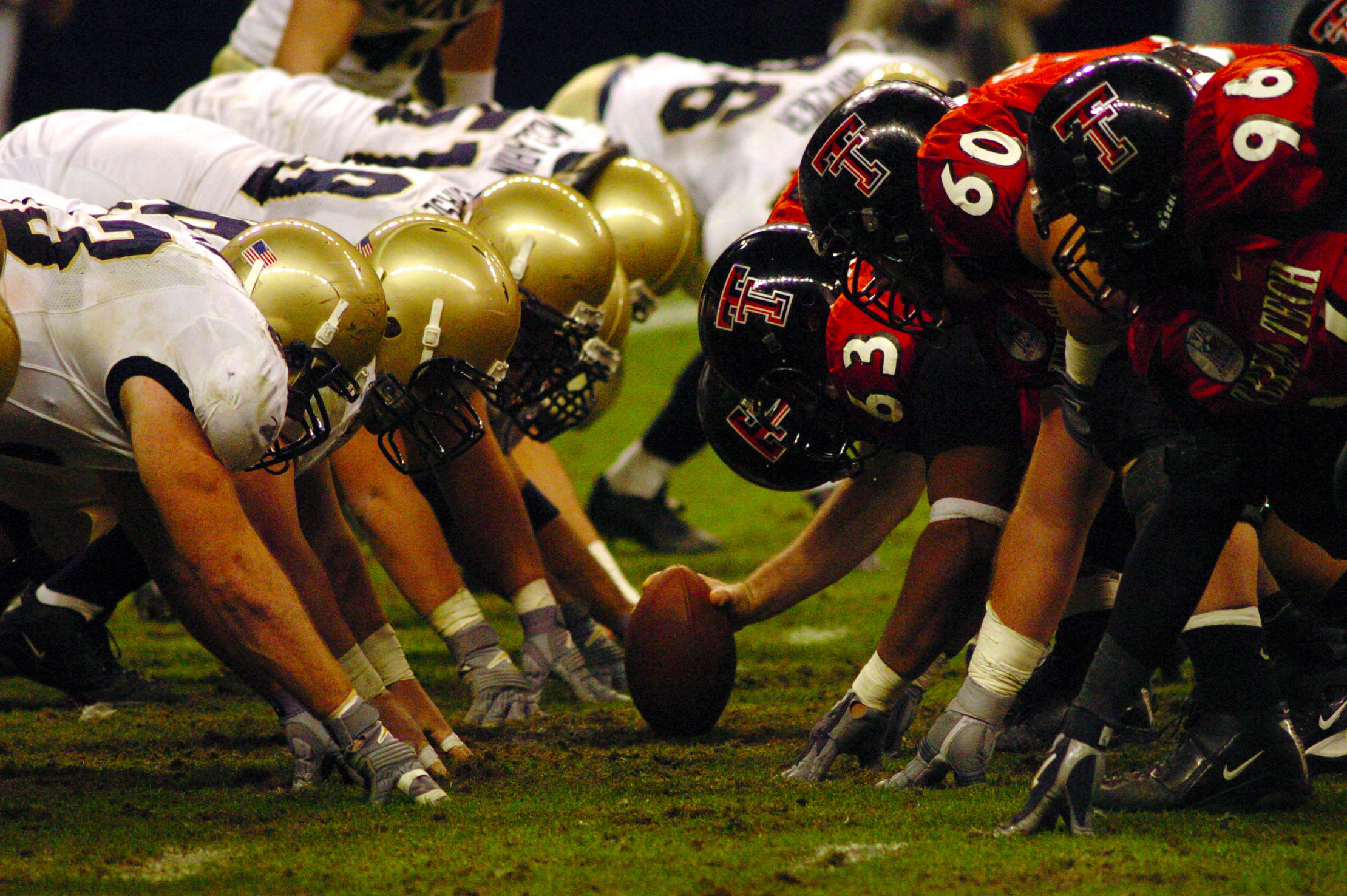
The Navy defensive (left) and Texas Tech offensive line (right) square off prior to a snap

A hard count by a quarterback at the beginning of a gridiron football play is an audible snap count that uses an irregular, accented (thus, the term "hard") cadence. When used, the center will hike the ball to the quarterback on an accented syllable (for example, "hut one ... hut two ... hut three ... hut hut HUT").

Quarterbacks can use a snap with two or more accented syllables in the hope of drawing an opposing player offside before the last accented syllable (for example, "hut one ... hut two ... hut three hut HUT ... hut HUT"). A loud home crowd can deprive a visiting quarterback of the ability to use this strategy.

== Outcomes ==
This play is often used in a fourth down situation, when fewer than 5 yards are needed for a first down. If the defense jumps offside, they are penalized 5 yards, resulting in a first down for the offense.

When used on fourth down if the defense does not go offside, the offense can either call a time out or take a five-yard penalty for delay of game and punt the ball away, or purposefully done to burn time near the end of the game and kick a field goal to tie or win the game. The hard count is also often used right before the end of the first or third quarters and before the two-minute warning since there will be a stoppage in play before any possible delay of game penalty in those situations.

If the defense jumps offside, but the offense begins their play, it is called a "free play", because if the offense gains yardage or scores a touchdown, they can decline the penalty and benefit from the gain or score, while if they execute a risky pass that is intercepted or are in their own end zone and are taken down for a safety, the turnover or defensive score is nullified by the offsides penalty.

The offense may choose to use the hard count throughout the game, in an attempt to confuse the defense, and get them to play more conservatively.

The offense's own offensive line is sometimes fooled by the hard count, resulting in a false start offensive infraction.
