= Shift (gridiron football) =

Movement in gridiron football

In gridiron football, a shift refers to the movement of an offensive player prior to the snap.

== Motion and shift ==
There is a distinction drawn between a shift and motion in football. Motion occurs when a player is moving at the time of the snap. A shift occurs when one or more players changes their position on the offensive side of the ball before the snap, causing a change in formation. For example, players may line up initially in an I-formation and then shift the two running backs into wide receiver positions to put the offense in a spread formation. A team may shift any number of players into new positions, so long as they all come to a complete stop for a full second before the ball is snapped to start the play.

The National Football League (NFL) defines all motion and shift penalties as "illegal motion", while both the National Collegiate Athletic Association (NCAA) and National Federation of State High School Associations (NFHS) make a distinction between an "illegal shift" and "illegal motion"; an illegal shift refers to players shifting and not coming to a complete stop before the snap, while illegal motion refers to a player who is in motion towards the line of scrimmage, or a player who is not a "back" in motion. In both leagues, however, the penalty for illegal motion/illegal shift is five yards from the previous spot and replay the down.

Additionally, the offensive team may be charged with the penalty of a "false start" if a player on the offense jumps or moves abruptly, simulating the start of the play. This movement is not normally considered a subset of the "motion" or "shift" rules, as the player is not judged to be moving into a new pre-snap position; they are merely starting the play too soon. This is also a five yard penalty.

== History ==
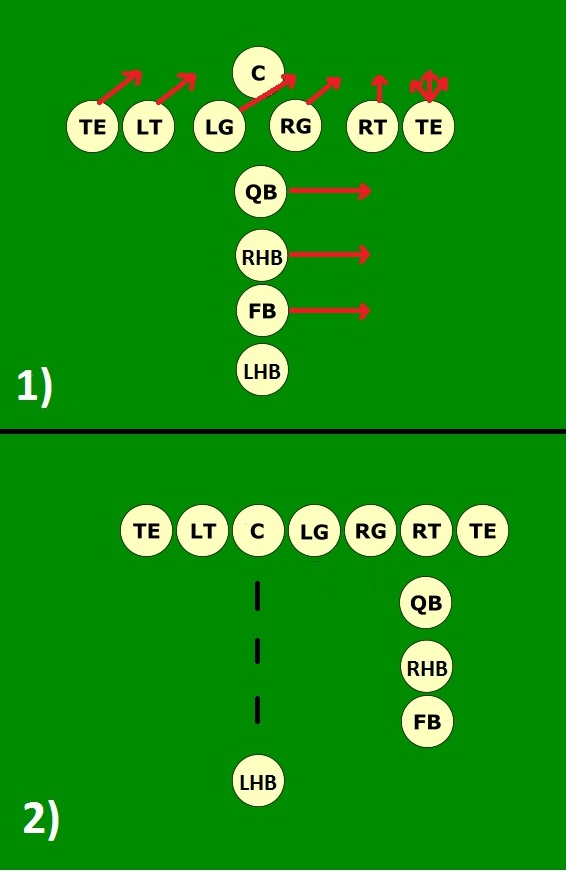
Diagram of the Heisman shift.

Both motions and shift were introduced by Amos Alonzo Stagg. The history of college football involves three notable, distinct shifts:

- The Minnesota shift, used by the likes of Henry L. Williams.
- The Jump shift or Heisman shift, used by the likes of John Heisman.
- The Notre Dame Box, used by the likes of Knute Rockne.
