= Minnesota–Nebraska football rivalry =

American college football rivalry

$5 Bits Of Broken Chair
- Minnesota Golden Gophers Nebraska Cornhuskers
- Sport: Football
- First meeting: November 29, 1900; Minnesota, 20–12
- Latest meeting: October 17, 2025; Minnesota, 24–6
- Next meeting: 2027
- Trophy: $5 Bits of Broken Chair Trophy

Statistics
- Total meetings: 65
- All-time series: Minnesota leads, 38–25–2 (.600)
- Trophy series: Minnesota leads, 8–3–0 (.727)
- Largest victory: Nebraska, 84–13 (1983)
- Longest win streak: Nebraska, 16 (1963–2012)
- Current win streak: Minnesota, 6 (2019–present)

Locations of Minnesota and Nebraska

The Minnesota–Nebraska football rivalry, also known as 'The $5 Bits Of Broken Chair Game' is an American college football rivalry between the Minnesota Golden Gophers and Nebraska Cornhuskers. The teams met regularly in the sport's early years and began an annual series when Nebraska joined the Big Ten Conference in 2011.

== History ==
=== Non-conference series ===
The early years of the rivalry can be separated into two distinct eras, Minnesota's dominance in the formative years of the sport and Nebraska's dominance under Bob Devaney and Tom Osborne from the 1960s through the 1990s.

Minnesota and Nebraska first met in 1900, a 20–12 Gophers victory in Lincoln in the first year of Henry L. Williams's tenure as head coach. The teams began an annual series; aside from a 6–0 Nebraska victory as part of an undefeated 1902 season, the series was controlled by Minnesota.

In 1911 and 1912, Minnesota gave Nebraska head coach Ewald O. Stiehm his only two losses across five years in Lincoln. Stiehm became enamored with the Minnesota shift, a precursor to modern pre-snap motion, and had an assistant document the technique during the teams' 1912 meeting. Stiehm implemented the shift and used it during a 7–0 victory over Minnesota in 1913, prompting Williams to discontinue the series, which was not regularly renewed until the year after his death in 1931.

Minnesota continued its success in the series through the 1950s, claiming national championships under Bernie Bierman and Murray Warmath and losing just four times to Nebraska.

The teams stopped playing annually in 1952, but still met regularly until 1990. Nebraska took control of the series in the early 1960s as Bob Devaney established the Cornhuskers as a national power. Devaney and his successor Tom Osborne faced the Gophers fourteen times, winning each game with an average margin of victory of over thirty points. This included an 84–13 victory in Minneapolis during a record-setting 1983 season, the most lopsided loss in Minnesota history.

=== Conference series ===
Nebraska joined the Big Ten Conference in 2011 and began an annual series with Minnesota as members of the Legends Division, and later the West Division. NU won the first two meetings as conference opponents, stretching its win streak over Minnesota to sixteen.

In November 2014, a Twitter exchange between Minnesota mascot Goldy Gopher and a parody account of Nebraska head coach Bo Pelini ("Faux Pelini") led to the creation of the $5 Bits of Broken Chair Trophy. After a friendly wager involving a smashed chair, a crowdsourcing campaign began to design a rivalry trophy. The final design depicted a broken chair with images of Goldy Gopher and Pelini, and was presented to Minnesota at Memorial Stadium after their first victory in Lincoln since 1960.

The $5 Bits of Broken Chair Trophy changed hands in 2015, making subsequent appearances with Nebraska players and coaches on social media. However, the university later distanced itself from the trophy, which disappeared after NU's victory over the Gophers in 2016; fan-led inquiries into its whereabouts were unsuccessful. The trophy was revived by fans in 2017 as a fundraiser for the University of Minnesota Masonic Children's Hospital and the Team Jack Foundation.

Minnesota won the $5 Bits of Broken Chair Trophy in the first year after it was reestablished and has retained it for six consecutive meetings.

== Game results ==
Minnesota victories	Nebraska victories	Tie games

No.	Date	Location	Winner	Score
1	November 29, 1900	Lincoln	Minnesota	20–12
2	October 12, 1901	Minneapolis	Minnesota	19–0
3	October 18, 1902	Minneapolis	Nebraska	6–0
4	October 29, 1904	Minneapolis	Minnesota	16–12
5	November 18, 1905	Minneapolis	Minnesota	35–0
6	November 3, 1906	Minneapolis	Minnesota	13–0
7	October 19, 1907	Minneapolis	Minnesota	8–5
8	October 17, 1908	Minneapolis	Tie	0–0
9	October 16, 1909	Omaha	Minnesota	14–0
10	October 16, 1910	Minneapolis	Minnesota	27–0
11	October 21, 1911	Minneapolis	Minnesota	21–3
12	October 19, 1912	Minneapolis	Minnesota	13–0
13	October 18, 1913	Lincoln	Nebraska	7–0
14	October 11, 1919	Minneapolis	Tie	6–6
15	October 15, 1932	Minneapolis	Minnesota	7–6
16	October 3, 1934	Minneapolis	Minnesota	20–0
17	October 12, 1935	Lincoln	Minnesota	12–7
18	October 10, 1936	Minneapolis	Minnesota	14–9
19	October 2, 1937	Lincoln	Nebraska	14–9
20	October 1, 1938	Minneapolis	Minnesota	16–7
21	October 7, 1939	Lincoln	Nebraska	6–0
22	October 5, 1940	Minneapolis	Minnesota	13–7
23	November 8, 1941	Minneapolis	Minnesota	9–0
24	October 17, 1942	Lincoln	Minnesota	15–2
25	October 2, 1943	Minneapolis	No. 9 Minnesota	54–0
26	September 30, 1944	Minneapolis	Minnesota	39–0
27	October 6, 1945	Lincoln	Minnesota	61–7
28	September 28, 1946	Minneapolis	Minnesota	33–6
29	October 4, 1947	Lincoln	Minnesota	28–13
30	October 2, 1948	Minneapolis	Minnesota	39–13
31	October 1, 1949	Lincoln	Minnesota	28–6
32	October 7, 1950	Minneapolis	Nebraska	32–26
33	October 20, 1951	Minneapolis	Minnesota	39–20

No.	Date	Location	Winner	Score
34	November 15, 1952	Lincoln	Minnesota	13–7
35	September 25, 1954	Minneapolis	Minnesota	19–7
36	September 26, 1959	Minneapolis	Nebraska	32–12
37	September 24, 1960	Lincoln	Minnesota	26–14
38	September 28, 1963	Minneapolis	Nebraska	14–7
39	September 26, 1964	Minneapolis	Nebraska	26–21
40	September 30, 1967	Lincoln	No. 7 Nebraska	7–0
41	September 28, 1968	Minneapolis	No. 9 Nebraska	17–14
42	October 4, 1969	Minneapolis	Nebraska	42–14
43	October 3, 1970	Minneapolis	No. 6 Nebraska	35–10
44	September 18, 1971	Lincoln	No. 1 Nebraska	35–7
45	September 30, 1972	Lincoln	No. 7 Nebraska	49–0
46	October 6, 1973	Minneapolis	No. 2 Nebraska	48–7
47	October 5, 1974	Lincoln	No. 6 Nebraska	54–0
48	September 17, 1983	Minneapolis	No. 1 Nebraska	84–13
49	September 15, 1984	Lincoln	No. 1 Nebraska	38–7
50	September 23, 1989	Minneapolis	No. 3 Nebraska	48–0
51	September 22, 1990	Lincoln	No. 8 Nebraska	56–0
52	October 22, 2011	Minneapolis	No. 13 Nebraska	41–14
53	November 17, 2012	Lincoln	No. 16 Nebraska	38–14
54	October 26, 2013	Minneapolis	Minnesota	34–23
55	November 22, 2014	Lincoln	No. 25 Minnesota	28–24
56	October 17, 2015	Minneapolis	Nebraska	48–25
57	November 12, 2016	Lincoln	No. 21 Nebraska	24–17
58	November 11, 2017	Minneapolis	Minnesota	54–21
59	October 20, 2018	Lincoln	Nebraska	53–28
60	October 12, 2019	Minneapolis	Minnesota	34–7
61	December 12, 2020	Lincoln	Minnesota	24–17
62	October 16, 2021	Minneapolis	Minnesota	30–23
63	November 5, 2022	Lincoln	Minnesota	20–13
64	August 31, 2023	Minneapolis	Minnesota	13–10
65	October 17, 2025	Minneapolis	Minnesota	24–6
Series: Minnesota leads 38–25–2

== See also ==
- List of NCAA college football rivalry games
