= Formation (American football) =

Position players line up in before the start of a down in American football

A formation in American football refers to the position players line up in before the start of a down. There are both offensive and defensive formations and many in both categories. Sometimes, formations are referred to as packages.

== Offense ==
At the highest level of play in the NFL and NCAA, the one constant in all formations is the offensive line, consisting of the left and right tackle, left and right guard, and a center. These five positions are often referred to collectively as the "line", and have the primary role of blocking. By rule, there must be two additional players on the line of scrimmage called ends. These players are eligible receivers and may play near the linemen (tight ends) or further away (split end or wide receiver). Most teams play additional players near (but still off) the line of scrimmage to act as extra pass receivers.

=== Offensive positions ===
Up to four players can be behind the offensive line, but one is always designated the quarterback (defined as the player who receives the ball from the center). Upon the snap of the ball, the quarterback becomes the ball carrier. The ball carrier has five options:

- He may keep the ball and run with it.
- He may hand or pitch the ball sideways or backward (also called a lateral) to another player, who then becomes the new ball carrier. Multiple pitches are permitted on a single play, as long as all of them go backward.
- He may throw a forward pass to an eligible receiver, who then becomes the new ball Carrier. Only one forward pass is permitted per play. The pass must be thrown from behind the original line of scrimmage, while the receiver can be anywhere on the field. A pass to a receiver who is also behind the line of scrimmage is still a forward pass as long as it travels forward. A forward pass is distinct from a pitch, and any number of pitches are permitted before or after a forward pass.
- He may hold the ball for a place-kicker who attempts a field goal.
- He may kick the ball himself, either by punting the ball to the other team or by attempting a drop-kicked field goal (which is rare).

The three other backs can be halfbacks (who primarily carry the ball), fullbacks (who mainly block), or they can play near (but not on) the line of scrimmage to act as extra tight ends or wide receivers. A tight end who fills the role as the 4th back is often called an "H-Back", and a wide receiver who fills that role is sometimes known as a "flanker" or a "slot" receiver (depending on where he lines up). Most formations have a "strong" side (the side with the tight end, or the side with more players) and a "weak side" (the side opposite the tight end, or the side with fewer players).

The ends, which may be either wide receivers or tight ends, may catch a passed ball or receive a handoff.

Descriptions and diagrams to display offensive formations typically use the following symbols:

- QB = quarterback (the player who leads and informs the offense of the plays)
- C = center (the player who begins the play with a snap on the line and blocks afterward)
- G = guard (the player who blocks on the line beside the center)
- T = tackle (the player who blocks on the line beside the guard)
- TE = tight end (the player who goes out for passes and often blocks on the line)
- WR = wide receiver (the player who gets assigned a route and must catch the ball when passed to)
- HB = halfback (the primary ball carrier)
- FB = fullback (the secondary ball carrier also used for blocking)

=== Rules ===
The offense is required to set up a formation before a play, subject to several rules:

- The formation must have at least 7 players on the line of scrimmage. The 7 players are not required to be next to each other and may spread out across the width of the field, but this is rare; most offenses place at least 5 players together in a continuous line. Teams may place more than 7 players on the line, but only the player at each end of the line can be an eligible receiver. This generally only occurs with the special formations used in kicking and punting situations.
- The other players not on the line (usually 4 in number) may be positioned anywhere, but all must be at least 1 yard behind the 7 or more players on the line of scrimmage. The traditional saying is "7 on the line, 4 in the backfield", but this is something of a misnomer, as "backfield" normally refers to the area directly behind the offensive line. 3 of the 4 "backfield" players (i.e., the 3 not receiving the snap from center) may line up as wide receivers if they are behind the line of scrimmage; these are known as slot receivers if between the ends, and "flankers" if outside the ends.
- Of the 7 (or more) players on the line of scrimmage, all except those at either end of the line are ineligible receivers. These players may not touch or catch a forward pass (unless it is first touched by an eligible receiver, including a deflection by a defensive player), and on a forward pass play, they may not advance downfield (i.e., across the neutral zone) before the pass crosses the neutral zone. Ineligible receivers may advance freely on a running play or after a pass is thrown. These players typically have uniform numbers in the range of 50-79 to indicate they are ineligible.
- In the NFL, players with numbers 50-79 are considered ineligible by default. They must report to the referee if they line up in a position that would normally be considered eligible; failure to do so will result in a penalty to the offense. The referee will relay that information to the defensive captain, and he will generally announce it to spectators as well. After reporting as eligible, those players may line up at any legal position just as if they were normally eligible receivers. Offenses sometimes use this tactic in a short yardage situation to provide extra blocking, and some plays are even designed for a designated player (i.e.: with numbers 50-79) to receive a pass.
- In high school (NFHS), numbers 50-79 are always ineligible, and may not receive. In fact, if one of these players bats, muffs, or catches a legal forward pass before it is touched by a defensive player, it is a penalty for illegal touching (5 yards plus loss of down). Typically you must have 5 players numbered 50-79 on the line of scrimmage, but there are exceptions to this rule when the offense is lined up in scrimmage kick formation (punt or field goal).
- The offense must set before the play. All players must take their positions and remain motionless for at least one second before the ball is snapped. Typically, after the offense breaks the huddle and walks to the line, the quarterback will call "set" and then begin his regular snap count. The offense is allowed to shift in certain situations and reorganize, but they must again set once they assume new positions. Once set, offensive players may not move until the snap and may not flinch to simulate a snap (with the exception of the man in motion, described below). A violation is a false start penalty.
- The offense may put one of the 4 backfield players in motion after the set but before the snap. The motion must be either parallel to or (if in the backfield) away from the line of scrimmage at the snap; certain types of football such as arena football allow forward motion at the snap. In Canadian football, all of the players in the backfield can be in motion, in any direction, at the time of the snap, as long as they have not crossed the line of scrimmage before the snap.

== Defense ==
Two terms often heard in referring to defensive formations are box and secondary. The box is defined as an area on the defensive side of the ball, within 5 yards of the line of scrimmage and framed by the offensive tackles. This area is commonly occupied by defensive linemen and linebackers. The secondary can refer to the defensive backs as a group, or to the area behind the linebackers usually occupied by defensive backs. The two standard NFL defenses, the 4-3 and the 3-4, have 7 players in the box. The phrase "8 in the box" is used to indicate that one of the two safeties has moved into the box to defend against the run.

=== Defensive positions ===
The three basic defensive positions are:

- Defensive lineman (DL): Linemen play at the line of scrimmage, directly across from the offensive line. They are categorized as defensive tackles (DT) or defensive ends (DE). The 4-3 defense has 2 tackles and 2 ends; the 3-4 defense has 2 ends and 1 tackle, who is sometimes called a nose tackle (NT) to indicate the 3-4. Tackles line up inside and rely on power to stop the run, while ends line up outside and are faster and more athletic to allow them to pursue the quarterback.
- Linebacker (LB): Linebackers are positioned 2 to 4 yards behind the defensive line. The 4-3 defense has 3 linebackers, who are categorized as strong, middle, and weak (SLB, MLB, WLB; also called Sam, Mike, and Will). This is not an indication of strength; it instead refers to the positioning of the linebackers relative to the offense. Strong linebackers line up on the same side as the tight end and weak side away from the tight end. A 3-4 defense will use 4 linebackers, who are indicated by their side (right/left) and positioning (inside/outside).
- Defensive back (DB): Defensive backs can include cornerbacks (CB), a strong safety (SS, lines up on same side as a tight end), and a free safety (FS, so called because they are "free" to roam where needed). Cornerbacks are almost always responsible for defending against the pass, particularly against wide receivers; often they are the fastest defensive players. Safeties also defend against the pass, matching up on tight ends and backs, but they are positioned in the center of the field to be prepared to stop the run as well.

=== Rules ===
Rules regarding defensive formations are not as complex or strict as their offensive counterparts. The defense may line up anywhere on its side of the neutral zone, and players are free to move at any time before the snap, but all defensive players must remain on their side of the neutral zone (defined as the length of the ball) before the snap. If they line up on the wrong side of the line, the offending players are offside. The exception is during a field goal attempt, PAT or punt. The defense is only allowed a maximum of 6 players on the line of scrimmage on either side of the snapper at the snap. Having 7 or more players on the line on one side will result in an illegal formation penalty. The standard defensive formations in use at most levels of American football are the result of decades of experimentation, trial and error, along with rule changes in the 1950s that eliminated the one-platoon system and gave greater prominence to lighter, faster linebackers (prior to the 1950s, most defensive formations were mirror images of those used on offense).

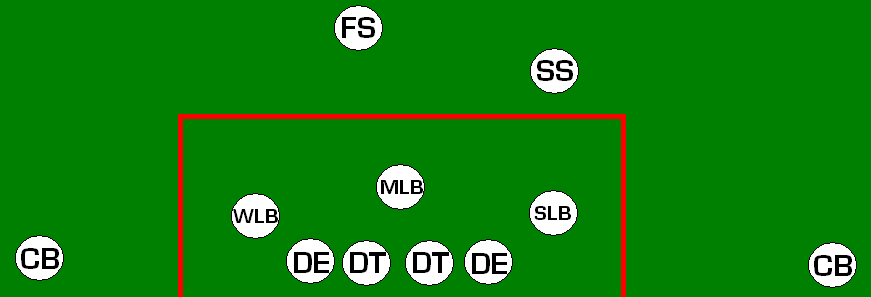
A defensive formation with the "box" highlighted.

This formation assumes the offense is lined up strong side right (from the offense's point of view). This diagram could be matched up to an offensive formation diagram to make a complete 22-player football field.

== See also ==
- List of formations in American football
- American football strategy
- Sports strategy
