= Notre Dame Box =

Formation in American football

Diagram of the Notre Dame Box

The Notre Dame Box is a variation of the single-wing formation used in American football, with great success by Notre Dame in college football and the Green Bay Packers of the 1920s and 1930s in the NFL. Green Bay's coach, Curly Lambeau, learned the Notre Dame Box while playing for Knute Rockne in the late 1910s. Rockne learned it from Jesse Harper, who learned it from coach Amos Alonzo Stagg. It contained two ends, and four backs. The formation often featured an unbalanced line where the center (that is, the player who snapped the ball) was not strictly in the center of the line, but close to the weakside.

Players line up in T formation then shift to a box formation. The Notre Dame Box differed from the traditional single-wing formation in that the line was balanced and the halfback who normally played the "wing" in the single-wing was brought in more tightly, with the option of shifting out to the wing. These two changes made the backs' formation resemble a square (hence "box") and made the formation less predictable, allowing offenses to run more easily to the "weak" side. Additionally, the halfback became a more viable runner than in the single-wing and the quarterback, normally just a blocking back in the single-wing, could become a passer since the center could snap the ball directly to him. The Notre Dame Box relied on a great deal of deception, caused by backs shifting frequently, rather than the pure power of the single-wing. Teams would often adopt the Notre Dame Box if they lacked a true "triple threat" tailback, necessary for effective single-wing use. Rockne's innovations with this formation involved using complicated backfield shifts and motion to confuse defenses, and adapting it as a passing formation. The formation was originally designed as a brute-force running formation, since it had seven players to one side of the center and only two on the other.

Although modern use of this offensive formation is largely defunct among college and professional teams, several high school football teams across the United States have revived the Notre Dame Box offense and have been highly efficient and successful. Three notable high schools that successfully implemented the Notre Dame Box offense extensively are Western Harnett High School in Lillington, North Carolina, Nauset Regional High School in Eastham, Massachusetts, and Isabella High School in Maplesville, Alabama.

== Professional use ==
The Packers, using the Notre Dame Box almost exclusively, won three straight NFL titles from 1929–1931. From 1936 through 1945, Green Bay made use of the Notre Dame Box to exploit Don Hutson's receiving ability. Bringing the halfback in tight allowed Hutson to split out from the line, making him an even more potent threat. Hutson, impossible to cover one-on-one by any defensive back of his day, averaged a touchdown every five times he caught the ball, a mark that no receiver has rivaled in NFL history. Green Bay added three more championships employing the Notre Dame Box after 1933 (when official championship games began), beating the Boston Redskins 21-6 in 1936, defeating the New York Giants 27-0 in 1939, and beating the Giants again in 1944 by a score of 14-7. Green Bay tailbacks of those years were among the first NFL passers to post "modern" numbers. Arnie Herber was the first NFL player to pass for over 1,000 yards in 1936, throwing for 1239 yards and 11 touchdowns. Of that, 526 yards and 8 touchdowns were to Hutson. In 1939, Herber and Cecil Isbell combined for 1856 yards passing and 14 touchdowns. In 1941, Isbell broke Herber's single season record with 1470 yards passing and 15 touchdowns; he bettered his own marks in 1942 with 2021 yards passing and 24 touchdowns. 1942 was also the year Don Hutson shattered his own NFL records with 1211 yards receiving and 17 touchdowns, all in 11 games.

The Chicago Bears's and Clark Shaughnessy's Stanford Indians success with a modernized version of the T-formation in the 1940s eventually led to the demise of the Notre Dame Box, as well as all single-wing variants. The Packers finally switched to the T-formation, after Don Hutson had retired, in 1947. No major NCAA or NFL team has used this formation since and much of the knowledge (i.e. playbooks and, if it ever existed, film) associated with this formation is no longer available.

== Modern use of the Notre Dame Box ==
Use of the Notre Dame Box in modern times has been limited in part due to changes in football rulebooks regarding motion. The frequent shifts in the backfield that are employed by the system are still legal, but teams must now set themselves in a formation for at least one second before snapping the ball or sending a player into motion. This motion player must be moving backward or laterally. Canadian football never adopted these changes, and (even though it is not used in that variant of the sport) the original version of the system is still legal.

In the late 1990s, Western Harnett High School of Lillington, North Carolina was featured on ESPN after their program experienced a major turnaround credited to their employment of the Notre Dame Box. The head coach of that team, Travis Conner, later moved on to Jacksonville High School in nearby Jacksonville, North Carolina and installed the Notre Dame Box there, as well. He then moved onto Bunker Hill High School and completely transformed their football program, with the new system Bunker Hill produced 3 top 10 rushers with the leader being Reggie Davis who rushed for a single season near 2,000 yards.

In 2010, Keith Kenyon took over the head coaching duties of the Varsity Football team at Nauset Regional High School in Massachusetts. His single wing offense is largely based on the Notre Dame Box formation. Since his arrival, he has taken a downtrodden Nauset team to a playoff contender in his first 2 years. Nauset went 6-5 in 2010, 8-3 in 2011, and 9-2 in 2012 due to the success of the Notre Dame Box. Also during the 2011 season, Nauset played in the Atlantic Coast League Championship game on Thanksgiving Day against rival, and eventual undefeated D-II State Champion, Dennis-Yarmouth, for a chance to qualify for the playoffs. In 2012, Nauset once again played for the Atlantic Coast League Championship against Plymouth South. Nauset came into the game undefeated, but ultimately lost 13-12 on a last second hook-and-ladder pass, barely missing out on the MIAA State Playoffs for the second year in a row. Before coach Kenyon arrived at Nauset in 2010, the football team had a combined record of 5-46 since 2005, including back-to-back winless seasons in 2005 and 2006, and also a 27-game losing streak from 2004–2007. Kenyon's single wing Notre Dame Box undoubtedly turned around the Nauset football program and turned them into one of the most dangerous and prolific teams in Eastern Massachusetts.

The formation is very prevalent in the north of England, and is used by many teams in BUAFL due to the lack of talented passers as well as the unpredictable weather conditions.

== See also ==
- List of formations in American football
