= Motion (gridiron football) =

Movement in gridiron football

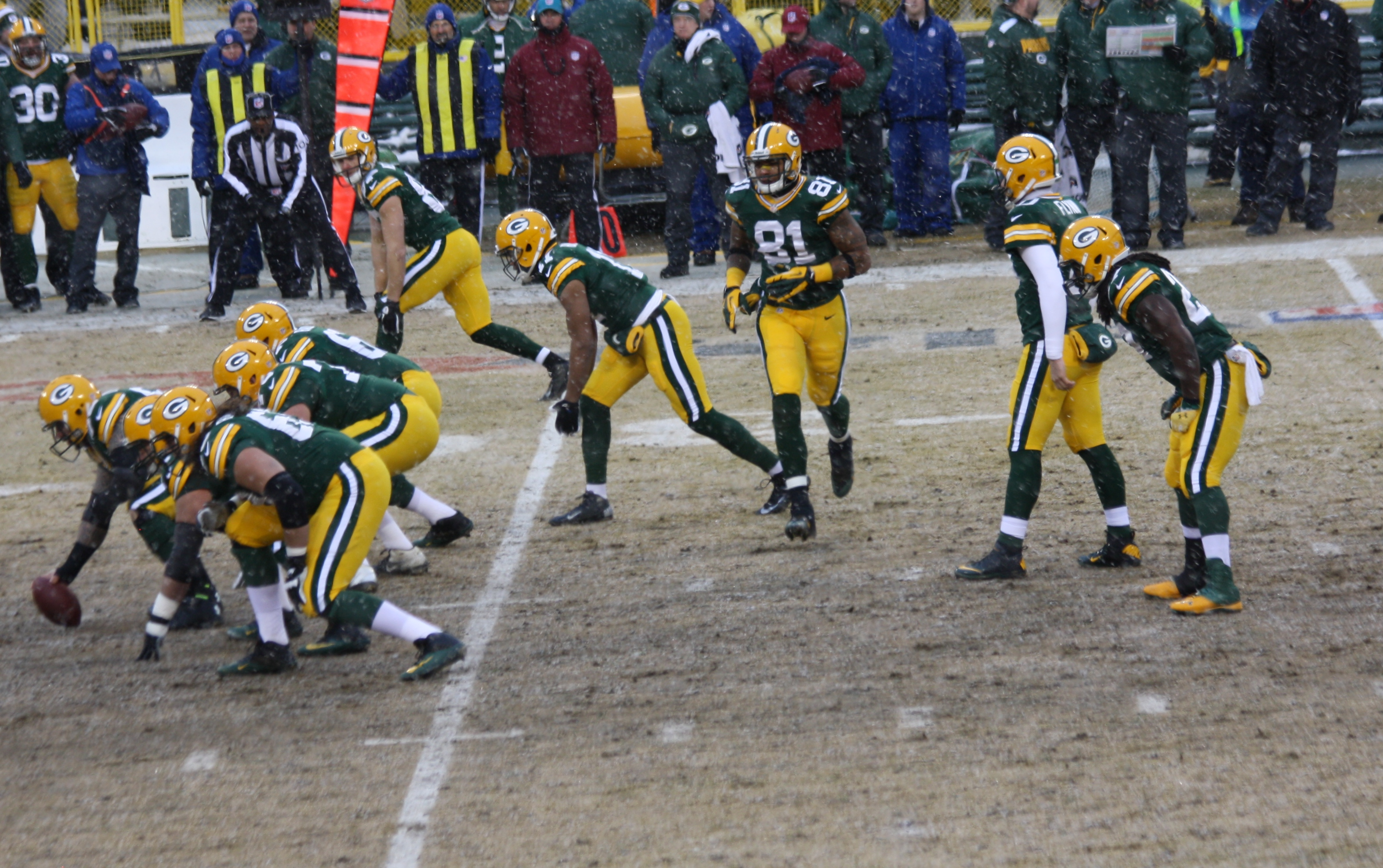
Tight end Andrew Quarless (81) in motion

In gridiron football, motion refers to the movement of an offensive player at the time of the snap.

While there are different rules regarding motion, most mandate that no more than one player may be in motion at the time of the snap, and the player must not be an offensive lineman (typically, the player in motion is a wide receiver or running back). Additionally, the NFL (professional), NCAA (college), and NFHS (high school) require that they be moving laterally or backwards; they are not allowed to be moving towards the line of scrimmage when the ball is snapped. The Canadian Football League (CFL) allows for motion towards the line of scrimmage at the time of the snap, as did the Arena Football League. The Indoor Football League allows two offensive players to engage in forward motion.

== Motion and shift ==
There is a distinction drawn between a shift and motion in football. Motion occurs when a player is moving at the time of the snap. A shift occurs when one or more players changes their position on the offensive side of the ball before the snap, causing a change in formation.

== Penalties ==
The National Football League (NFL) defines all motion and shift penalties as "illegal motion", while both the National Collegiate Athletic Association (NCAA) and National Federation of State High School Associations (NFHS) make a distinction between an "illegal shift" and "illegal motion"; an illegal shift refers to players shifting and not coming to a complete stop before the snap, while illegal motion refers to a player who is in motion towards the line of scrimmage, or a player who is not a "back" in motion. In both leagues, however, the penalty for illegal motion/illegal shift is five yards from the previous spot and replay the down.

Additionally, the offensive team may be charged with the penalty of a "false start" if a player on the offense jumps or moves abruptly, simulating the start of the play. This movement is not normally considered a subset of the "motion" or "shift" rules, as the player is not judged to be moving into a new pre-snap position; he is merely starting the play too soon. This is also a five-yard penalty.

== History and purpose ==
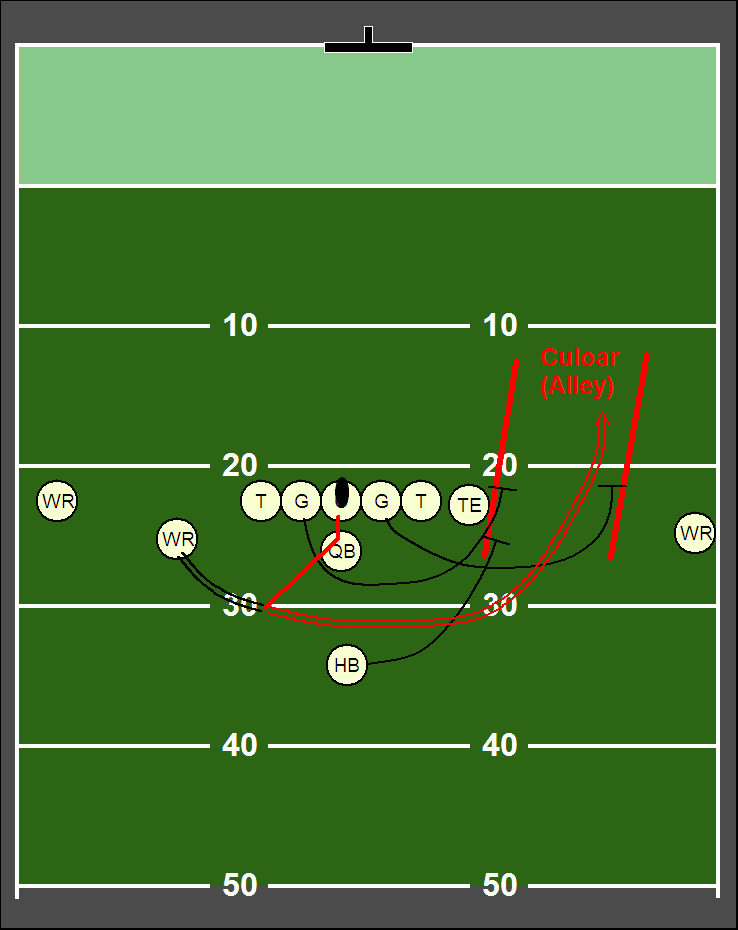
The flanker sweep is often run with a wide receiver in motion.

In the earliest days of American football, offenses were allowed to shift and assemble themselves as much as they wanted as defenses are still allowed to do. The Minnesota shift and the Notre Dame Box were offensive systems of the early 20th century which relied heavily on shifting into new formations right before the play so that key players were already moving at the snap. However, rule changes were eventually implemented that banned wholesale formation shifts after the offensive team has lined up and required players to remain in that formation for at least one second before a snap or motion can occur.

One purpose for putting players in motion in the modern game is to gain clues about the defensive play call, particularly whether the defense is in "zone" or "man-to-man" coverage, as a defender assigned to cover a motioning offensive player will usually follow him across the formation. If the offensive team believes it knows the defense's cover scheme, it might audible to a play that is better suited to defeating the defense's strategy. Players in motion might also confuse a defense that does not communicate well, potentially leaving a pass receiver uncovered. The motion might also be used to allow an offensive player to start the play while already running at top speed parallel to the line of scrimmage such as in a flanker sweep play. In leagues that allow forward motion, receivers can begin the play already sprinting down the field, potentially allowing them to run past defenders.

== Requirements ==
In all forms of football, only players in the backfield and not on the line of scrimmage may be in motion at the time of the snap. Prior to starting the motion, all players on the offensive side must be in a set formation for a minimum of one second.

In most versions of American football, only one player may be in motion at one time, and the player must not move toward the line of scrimmage in his motion (in other words, he can only move laterally or backward). In no situation may the moving player begin on the line of scrimmage when he moves (in other words, offensive linemen are prohibited from motion prior to the snap). Any player who shifts from a lineman position to a back position must set in position at least five yards behind the line of scrimmage before going into motion.

Exceptions are as follows:

- Pro Bowl: Motion is prohibited.
- XFL (2001), WFL, Arena Football League and most other indoor football leagues: One player in motion is allowed; he can move toward the line of scrimmage only if he is outside the offensive tackles. (The 2020 XFL has not indicated whether or not it will revive the forward motion rule.)
- American Indoor Football: Two players in motion were allowed, both could move toward the line of scrimmage, one each outside the guard or tight end.
- Canadian football: All backfield players are allowed to move toward the line of scrimmage before the snap, regardless of their horizontal position.

In leagues that allow forward motion, the moving player(s) cannot cross the line of scrimmage, otherwise a false start penalty is called.
