= Umbrella defense =

An umbrella defense is a formation used in field sports:

- Rugby league
- American football

See also:

- Umbrella
