= Western Harnett High School =

American public school in North Carolina

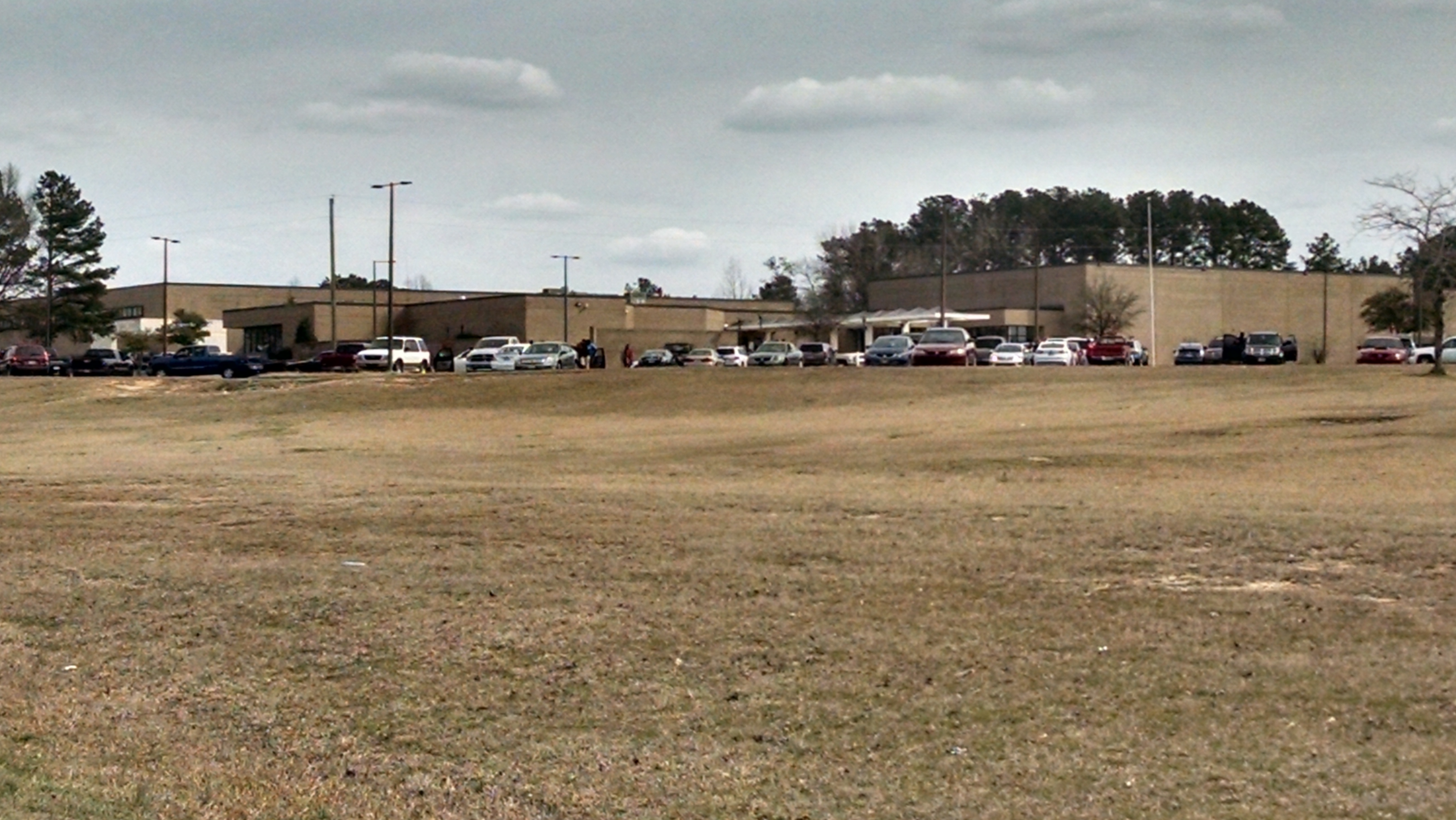
- Western Harnett High School, west side

Location
- 10637 Highway 27 West; Lillington, North Carolina 27546-9600; United States; 35°20′10″N 78°58′52″W

Information
- Type: Public
- Established: 1977 (49 years ago)
- School district: Harnett County Schools
- Superintendent: Aaron Fleming
- CEEB code: 342322
- Principal: Ryan McNeill
- Faculty: 73.46 (FTE)
- Grades: 9–12
- Enrollment: 1,343 (2023–2024)
- Student to teacher ratio: 18.28
- Colors: Red, white, and blue
- Team name: Eagles
- Communities served: Boone Trail and Benhaven
- Feeder schools: Western Harnett Middle School
- Website: www.harnett.k12.nc.us/o/whh

Western Harnett High School is one of six high schools in Harnett County, North Carolina, United States. The other high schools include, Harnett Central, Triton, Overhills, the alternative school and Harnett Early College, located in Dunn, NC. WHHS is located approximately 11 miles southwest of Lillington, the county seat on N.C. Highway 27. The school was officially dedicated in May 1978, along with Harnett Central High School. The mascot for WHHS is the eagle.

== History ==
Ground was broken for Western Harnett High School in October 1975. Those present at this ceremony were Superintendent R. A. Gray, Harnett County Commissioners, and the three student council presents from the three high schools that would compose Western Harnett: Boone Trail, Benhaven, and Anderson Creek. Construction on Western Harnett took two years. The doors opened for students on September 7, 1977. Ross Lane had been hired by HCS to be the first principal, but before the school year even started he left for another position. Bob Beasley, principal at Angier High School was chosen to be the first principal at Western Harnett High School. He remained as principal until 1987 when he was elevated to the position of Assistant Superintendent of Harnett County Schools. Beasley was followed by Donny Hunter, 1987–1988; G Steve McNeill, 1988–1990; Henry Holt, 1990–1999; David Stewart, 1999–2000; David Pugh, 2000–2001; Jackie Samuels, 2001–2003; Terry Hinson, 2003–2008; William Wright, 2008–2011; Stan Williams, 2011–2013; Chris Pearson 2013–2018; Matthew Price 2018–2022; Ryan Mcneill 2022&present. In 2002, it was entered into U.S. Congressional testimony that Western Harnett had so increased size that 22 trailers were being used to accommodate the large student body. After swelling to more than 1,900 students in 2003–04, Overhills High School was opened to help accommodate the large number of students in the area, which encompassed the Anderson Creek and part of the Benhaven school district.

== Demographics ==
Western Harnett is ethnically diverse, with about a fifth of the student population of black ethnicity, another fifth of Hispanic ethnicity and just over half of the student population of white ethnicity. About 9 percent of the student population participates in Advance Placement (AP) programs.

== Notable alumni ==
- Eric Swann, former NFL defensive tackle and 2x Pro Bowl selection
