= Eric Swann =

American football player (born 1970)

No. 98
- Position: Defensive tackle

Personal information
- Born: August 16, 1970 (age 56); Pinehurst, North Carolina, U.S.
- Listed height: 6 ft 5 in (1.96 m)
- Listed weight: 317 lb (144 kg)

Career information
- High school: Western Harnett (Lillington, North Carolina)
- College: Wake Tech (1989)
- NFL draft: 1991: 1st round, 6th overall pick

Career history
- Bay State Titans (1990); Phoenix / Arizona Cardinals (1991–1999); Carolina Panthers (2000); Hudson Valley Saints (2007)

Awards and highlights
- 2× Pro Bowl (1995, 1996)

Career NFL statistics
- Total tackles: 463
- Sacks: 46.5
- Safeties: 3
- Forced fumbles: 6
- Fumble recoveries: 8
- Pass deflections: 8
- Interceptions: 2
- Defensive touchdowns: 1
- Stats at Pro Football Reference

Eric Jerrod Swann (born August 16, 1970) is an American former professional football player who was a defensive tackle in the National Football League (NFL). He was selected by the Phoenix Cardinals in the first round of the 1991 NFL draft with the sixth overall pick. He never attended college and was selected from the semi-professional Bay State Titans. He played in the NFL for 10 seasons from 1991 to 2000 for the Arizona Cardinals and the Carolina Panthers.

== High school ==
Swann played high-school football at Western Harnett High School in Lillington, North Carolina and graduated in 1989. During his high-school years, he was state runner-up in shot-put and discus throwing, recording distances of 54' 02" and 152' 06" respectively.

== Semi-pro career ==
Swann was bound for North Carolina State University but was ruled academically ineligible. Rather than enrolling under Proposition 48, he left Wake Tech in 1990 to join the semi-pro Bay State Titans in Lynn, Massachusetts with a $5-per-hour salary.

== Professional career ==
Swann was selected in the first round of the 1991 NFL draft with the sixth overall pick. On April 24, 1991, Swann signed a five-year contract with the Phoenix Cardinals. In 1995 and 1996, Swann was named an NFL All-Pro and selected for the NFC Pro Bowl team.

In 1998, Swann re–signed with the Cardinals on a five-year, $25 million contract with a $7.5 million signing bonus, the richest contract ever signed by a Cardinals player to date. Because he was recovering from knee surgeries, Swann did not practice with the Cardinals in the 1999 training-camp period. In 1999, he played nine games and recorded four sacks and a 42-yard interception.

The Cardinals waived Swann on July 11, 2000. Two weeks later, he signed a one-year, veteran minimum deal with the Carolina Panthers along with Reggie White.

In 2007, Swann played for the Hudson Valley Saints of the North American Football League.

Swann was inducted into the American Football Association's Semi Pro Football Hall of Fame in 1998.
