= Paul Gervase =

American baseball player (born 2000)

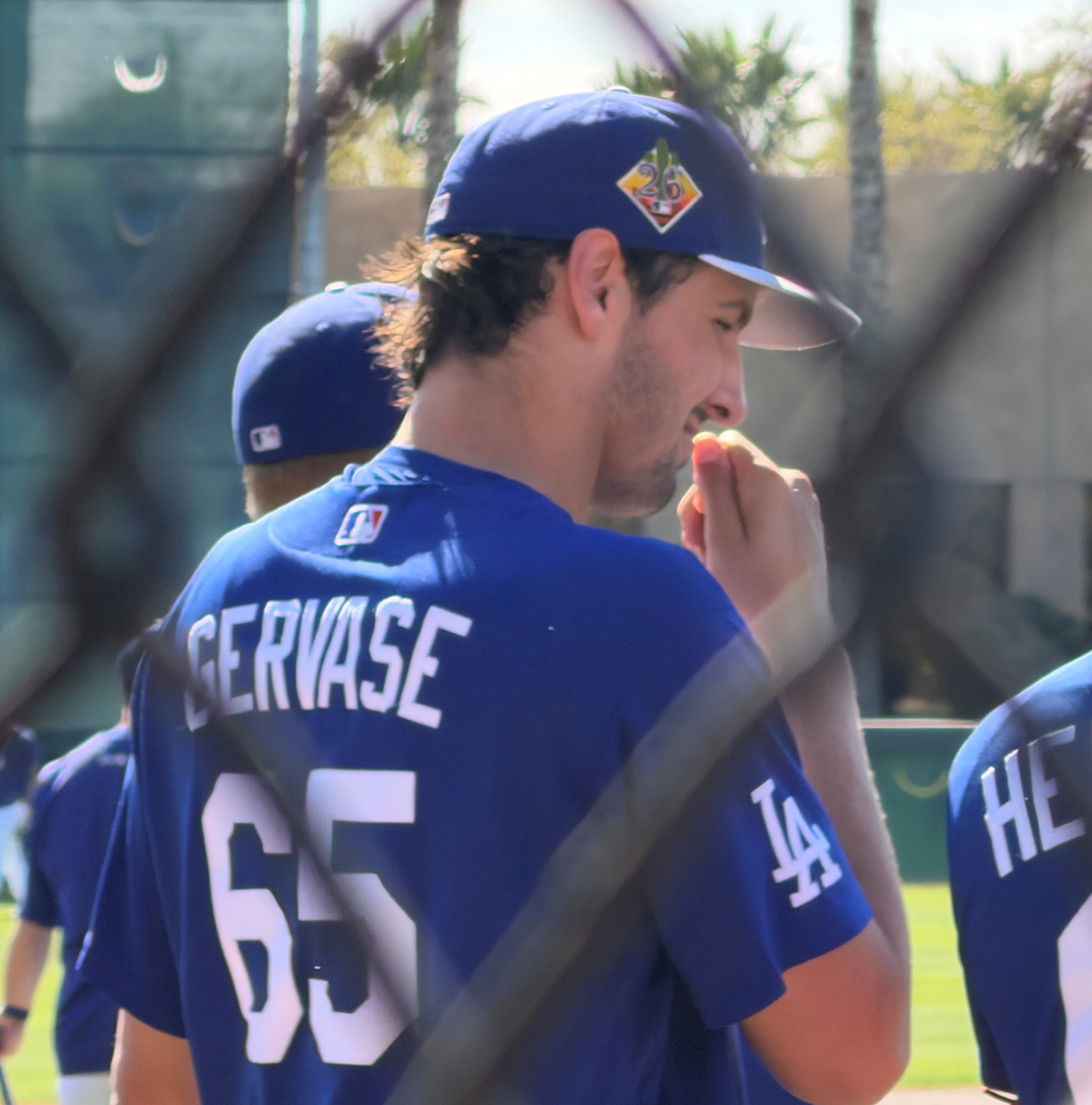
- Gervase during spring training with the Los Angeles Dodgers in 2026

Los Angeles Dodgers – No. 65
- Pitcher
- Born: May 23, 2000 (age 26); Cary, North Carolina, U.S.
- Bats: Right Throws: Right

MLB debut
- June 21, 2025, for the Tampa Bay Rays

MLB statistics (through 2026 season)
- Win–loss record: 0–0
- Earned run average: 3.38
- Strikeouts: 16
- Stats at Baseball Reference

Teams
- Tampa Bay Rays (2025); Los Angeles Dodgers (2025–present)

Paul Thomas Gervase (born May 23, 2000) is an American professional baseball pitcher for the Los Angeles Dodgers of Major League Baseball (MLB). He has previously played in MLB for the Tampa Bay Rays.

== Amateur career ==
A native of Cary, North Carolina, Gervase graduated from Harnett Central High School in Angier, North Carolina. He did not receive a scholarship offer to play college baseball and enrolled at Pfeiffer University, where he played at the NCAA Division III level. He transferred to Wake Technical Community College in 2020 and to Pitt Community College in 2021 before transferring to Louisiana State University (LSU) to play for the LSU Tigers in 2022. In 2022, he played collegiate summer baseball with the Brewster Whitecaps of the Cape Cod Baseball League.

== Professional career ==
=== New York Mets ===
The New York Mets selected Gervase in the 12th round, with the 359th overall selection, of the 2022 MLB draft. He split his first professional season between the rookie-level Florida Complex League Mets and Single-A St. Lucie Mets, posting a combined 5.56 earned run average (ERA) in eight games. He split the 2023 season between the High-A Brooklyn Cyclones and Double-A Binghamton Rumble Ponies. In 38 appearances out of the bullpen for the two affiliates, he compiled an aggregate 4–2 record and 2.05 ERA with 96 strikeouts and seven saves over 57 innings pitched.

Gervase began the 2024 season with Double-A Binghamton, logging a 3–2 record and 3.25 ERA with 46 strikeouts and five saves in 27 2/3 innings pitched across 22 games.

=== Tampa Bay Rays ===
On July 30, 2024, Gervase was traded to the Tampa Bay Rays for pitcher Tyler Zuber. Gervase finished the year with the Triple-A Durham Bulls, recording a 3.57 ERA with 31 strikeouts over 15 games.

Gervase began the 2025 season with Triple-A Durham, posting a 2–3 record and 3.78 ERA with 50 strikeouts and two saves across 23 appearances. On June 21, he was promoted to the major leagues for the first time. He made his MLB debut with two scoreless innings against the Detroit Tigers on June 21. His first MLB strikeout was of Parker Meadows. In five games, Gervase pitched 6 1/3 innings, allowing three runs on three solo home runs while striking out six.

=== Los Angeles Dodgers ===
On July 31, 2025, the Rays traded Gervase, Ben Rortvedt and Adam Serwinowski to the Los Angeles Dodgers for catcher Hunter Feduccia. Gervase made one appearance for the Dodgers, allowing one run on two hits and a walk in two innings while pitching in 15 games for the Triple-A Oklahoma City Comets, allowing 10 runs on 14 hits in 19 innings.

Gervase was optioned to Oklahoma City to begin the 2026 season and was recalled to the majors in early May following an injury to Tyler Glasnow, then was sent down after one three-inning appearance. Gervase returned later in May, pitching in one game, then again briefly in July. On the season, he pitched 7 2/3 innings for the Dodgers, allowing two runs on seven hits (2.35 ERA) while pitching 49 innings over 39 games for the Comets, with a 3–1 record and 4.78 ERA.
