= Encroachment (gridiron football) =

Penalty

In gridiron football, there are several different rulings for encroachment:

1. In the NFL, encroachment occurs when, before the snap, a defensive player illegally crosses the line of scrimmage and makes contact with an opponent or has a clear path to the quarterback. Play is immediately stopped, just as it is with a false start (this violation would be an offside penalty in the NCAA).
2. In high school, encroachment includes any crossing of the neutral zone by the defense, whether contact is made or not. It is similar to offside except when it occurs, the play is not allowed to begin. Like offside violations, the violating team is penalized five yards.
3. In the NCAA, an encroachment penalty is called, when there is an offensive player beyond the line of scrimmage after the snapper touching the ball. There is no encroachment for defensive players in college football.

The head linesman has the duty of watching out for encroachment and other similar infractions, and the line judge assists in this process.

== See also ==
- Offside (American football)
