= Offside (American football) =

Minor foul in gridiron football

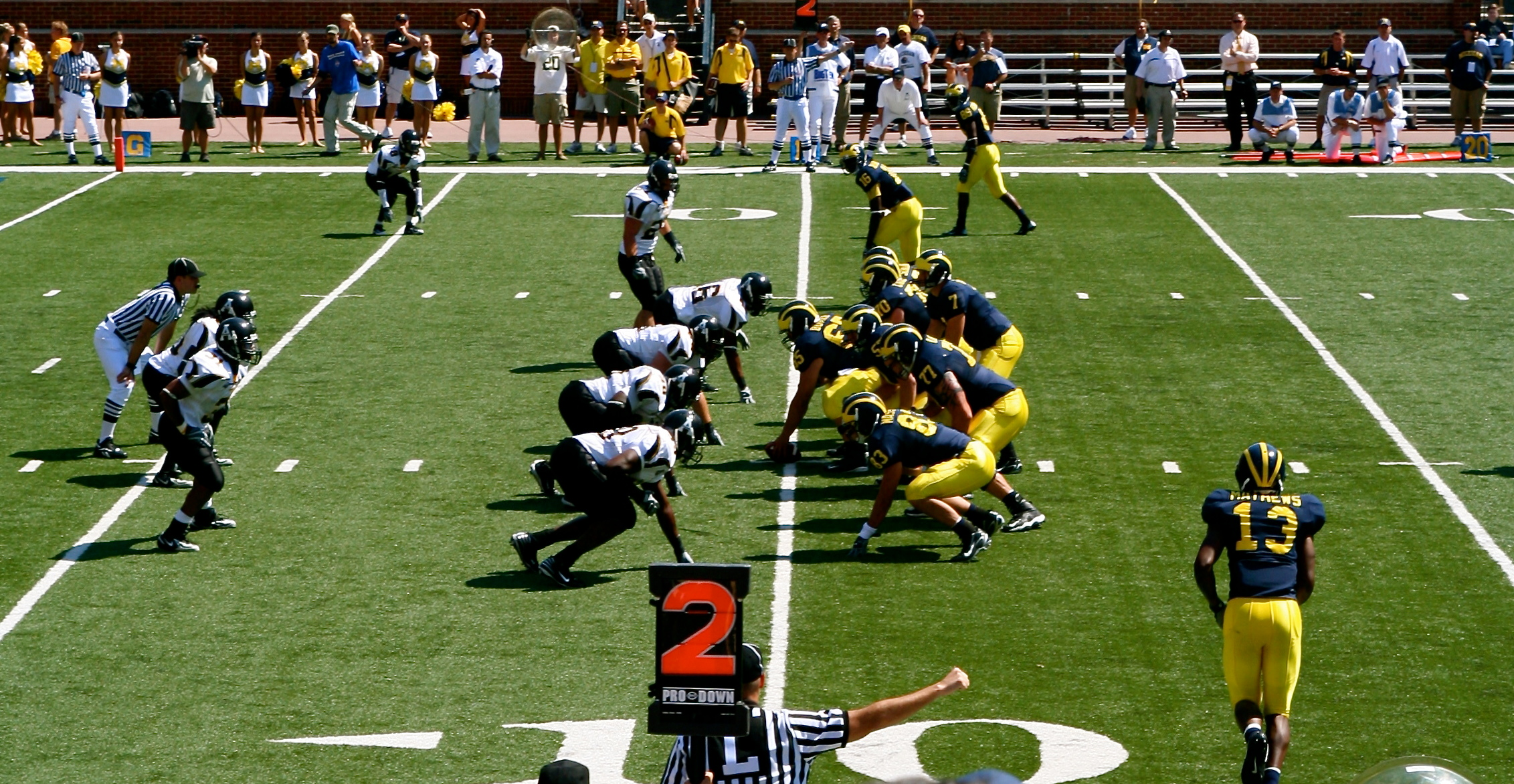
All players from both teams must stay on their side of the line of scrimmage until the point of the snap to avoid committing an offside penalty. Only the ball snapper, in this case the center, can be in the neutral zone but otherwise cannot advance beyond it. In this picture, the line of scrimmage happens to line up with the horizontal white-painted 10-yard line

Offside is a minor foul in gridiron football caused when a player crosses the line of scrimmage ahead of the snap of the ball. The penalty associated with the infraction is the advancing of the ball five yards and a replay of the down.

== History ==
=== Definition ===
In gridiron football, offside is a foul in which a player is on the wrong side of the line of scrimmage when the ball is snapped. The foul occurs simultaneously with the snap.

Offside is committed by the defense when a defensive player crosses the line of scrimmage before the ball is snapped. In the case of an offside foul, play is not stopped, and the foul is announced at the conclusion of the play, giving the offense a free play because the non-offending team can choose whether to accept the result of the play or accept the five yards gained by the penalty.

Although an offside foul is usually committed by the defense, if an offensive player lines up in the neutral zone, an offside foul will be called against the offense. An offside foul will also be called if the ball snapper advances past the neutral zone before snapping the ball.

In high school games played under the NFHS ruleset, the term "offside" is not used; rather the foul is referred to as encroachment and causes the ball to remain dead. However, the penalty remains five yards, the same as other rule codes.

=== Penalty ===
Prior to 1925, a call of offside against a defensive unit brought with it an automatic first down in addition to a five-yard advancement of the ball for the offense. However, a December 1924 meeting of the Football Coaches' Association of America spurred a change of rules for the 1925 season eliminating the provision for an automatic first down, while leaving the five yard penalty intact.

The penalty for violation remains five yards at most levels of professional and amateur play.

== See also ==
- Encroachment (gridiron football)
