= Triton High School (North Carolina) =

American public school in North Carolina

Location
- 215 Maynard Lake Rd; Erwin, North Carolina 28339; United States; 35°20′18″N 78°39′54″W

Information
- School type: Public
- Established: 1985 (41 years ago)
- School district: Harnett County Schools
- CEEB code: 341220
- Principal: Marshall Jones
- Staff: 72.56 (FTE)
- Grades: 9–12
- Enrollment: 1,306 (2023–2024)
- Student to teacher ratio: 18.00
- Colors: Blue and gray
- Team name: Hawks
- Feeder schools: Coats-Erwin Middle School, Dunn Middle School
- Website: ths.harnett.k12.nc.us

Triton High School is a traditional public high school which opened in October 1985, which currently houses 1,306 students in grades nine through twelve, and 126 instructional staff members. Triton is one of five high schools in the Harnett County School System.

== Athletics ==
Triton offers the following sports:

- Baseball
- Basketball
- Golf
- Cheer leading
- Cross Country
- American football
- Softball
- Tennis
- Soccer
- Swimming
- Track and Field
- Volleyball
- Wrestling

== Notable alumni ==
- Morgan Goff, professional soccer player in the NWSL
- Clayton White, NFL player and college football coach
