= Harnett Central High School =

Public school in Angier, North Carolina, US

Location
- 2911 Harnett Central Rd; Angier, North Carolina 27501; United States
- 35°27′48″N 78°46′46″W

Information
- School type: Public
- Founded: 1977 (49 years ago)
- School district: Harnett County Schools
- CEEB code: 340071
- Principal: Catherine Jones
- Staff: 75.09 (FTE)
- Enrollment: 1,493 (2023–2024)
- Student to teacher ratio: 19.88
- Colors: Burgundy and gold
- Team name: Trojans
- Feeder schools: Harnett Central Middle School
- Website: www.harnett.k12.nc.us/o/hch

Harnett Central High School is a high school located in Angier, North Carolina. HCHS is one of six high schools in Harnett County. Harnett Central High School's mascot is the HCHS Trojan. The school colors are burgundy and gold. The feeder school for Harnett Central High is Harnett Central Middle School.

== Notable alumni ==
- Paul Gervase, MLB pitcher
- Rhoda Griffis, actress
- Tony Johnson, professional soccer player
- Rhett and Link, YouTube entertainment duo
