= Harnett County Schools =

School district in North Carolina, US

Location
- Harnett County, North Carolina United States

District information
- Type: Public
- Motto: "Inspiring learners to be leaders!"
- Grades: 12
- Superintendent: Aaron Fleming
- Schools: 29 (including college is 30)
- Budget: $176,959,000
- NCES District ID: 3702010

Students and staff
- Students: 19,704
- Teachers: 1,234.92 (on FTE basis)
- Staff: 1,067.26 (on FTE basis)
- Student–teacher ratio: 15.96:1

Other information
- Website: www.harnett.k12.nc.us

Harnett County Schools is a PK–12 graded school district serving Harnett County, North Carolina. Its 29 schools served 20,095 students in the 2024-25 school year.

High school students living in the Linden Oaks housing development, of Fort Bragg, are assigned to Harnett County Schools' Overhills High School.

== History ==
A push for school consolidation began in the 1920s. By 1933, more modern high schools and community schools were developed. Another push for consolidation occurred in the 1970s after desegregation.

The latter push for school consolidations began in 1963. However, county residents four times rejected bond referendums that would help pay for new schools. Even though the bond referendum failed in 1974, the county commissioners moved forward with their plans for the school construction, approving a tax increase to help fund it. The result was three new high schools: Western Harnett and Harnett Central in 1978, as well as Triton in 1986.

== Student demographics ==
For the 2014–15 school year, Harnett County Schools had a total population of 20,506 students and 1,260.96 teachers on a (FTE) basis. This produced a student-teacher ratio of 16.26:1. That same year, out of the total student population, the gender ratio was 52% male to 48% female. The demographic group makeup was: White, 53%; Black, 25%; Hispanic, 16%; American Indian, 1%; and Asian/Pacific Islander, 0% (two or more races: 4%). For the same school year, 56.12% of the students received free and reduced-cost lunches.

== Governance ==
The primary governing body of Harnett County Schools follows a council–manager government format with a five-member Board of Education appointing a Superintendent to run the day-to-day operations of the system. The school system currently resides in the North Carolina State Board of Education's Fourth District.

=== Board of education ===
The five members of the Board of Education are chosen in partisan elections by districts to four-year terms. They generally meet on the first Monday of each month. The current members of the board are: Jason Lemons (District III), Vivian Bennett (District I), William H. Morris (District II), Duncan E. Jaggers (Chair, District IV), and Don R Godfrey (Vice-Chair, District V). The superintendent serves as secretary of the board.

=== Superintendent ===
The current superintendent of the system is Aaron Fleming.

== Schools ==
=== High Schools ===
- Harnett Central High
- Harnett County Early College
- Overhills High
- Star Academy
- Triton High
- Western Harnett High

=== Middle Schools ===
- Coats-Erwin Middle
- Dunn Middle
- Flatwoods Middle (opening 2027-2028 school year)
- Harnett Central Middle
- Highland Middle
- Overhills Middle
- Shughart Middle (part of DoWEA)
- Star Academy
- Western Harnett Middle

=== Elementary/Primary Schools ===
- Anderson Creek Primary
- Angier Elementary
- Benhaven Elementary
- Boone Trail Elementary
- Buies Creek Elementary
- Coats Elementary
- Dunn Elementary
- Erwin Elementary
- Highland Elementary
- Johnsonville Elementary
- LaFayette Elementary
- Lillington-Shawtown Elementary
- North Harnett Primary
- Northwest Harnett Elementary
- Overhills Elementary
- South Harnett Elementary
