= Minnesota shift =

American football maneuver

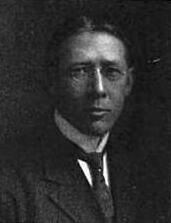
Minnesota coach Henry L. Williams is credited with the shift's invention.

The Minnesota shift is an American football offensive maneuver that was a forerunner of other shifts and pre-snap formation changes in the game. It consists of a sudden switch into a new offensive formation immediately before the ball is snapped with the intent of keeping the defense off balance and disguising the intended point of attack. University of Minnesota Golden Gophers coach Dr. Henry L. Williams is credited with its invention in the first decade of the 20th century, and his institution lends its name to the shift.

The maneuver gained national attention when it was adopted by period powerhouse Yale University in 1910. Williams, an 1891 graduate of Yale, had earlier repeatedly offered to mentor his alma mater in the formation, but was rebuffed because the Elis would "not [take] football lessons from a Western university." In 1910, the Elis suffered early season setbacks at the hands of inferior opponents, and sought an advantage to use in its game against strong Princeton and Harvard squads. Former Yale end Thomas L. Shevlin, who had served as an assistant coach at Minnesota, taught the team the shift. Yale used the Minnesota shift against both opponents, and beat Princeton, 5–3, and tied Harvard, 0–0.

In 1917, Wisconsin head coach John R. Richards claimed that Chicago's Amos Alonzo Stagg, despite inventing the shift, had never been able to develop a counter to the Minnesota shift.

In 1921, Ohio State employed a maneuver it called "guards over" that "checked the touted Minnesota shift more completely than any other Conference team has ever done," which forced the Gophers to resort unsuccessfully to the forward pass. The following season, Michigan also effectively shut down the shift behind good line play.

The Minnesota shift lost favor as an overriding offensive strategy during the 1920s as more complicated systems were developed, and later rule changes required shifting offensive players to remain stationary for a full second in their new positions before the snap of the ball. However, the basic idea of shifting, or motioning offensive personnel to confuse the defense is still widely used.
