= Snap (gridiron football) =

Backward passing of the ball in gridiron football

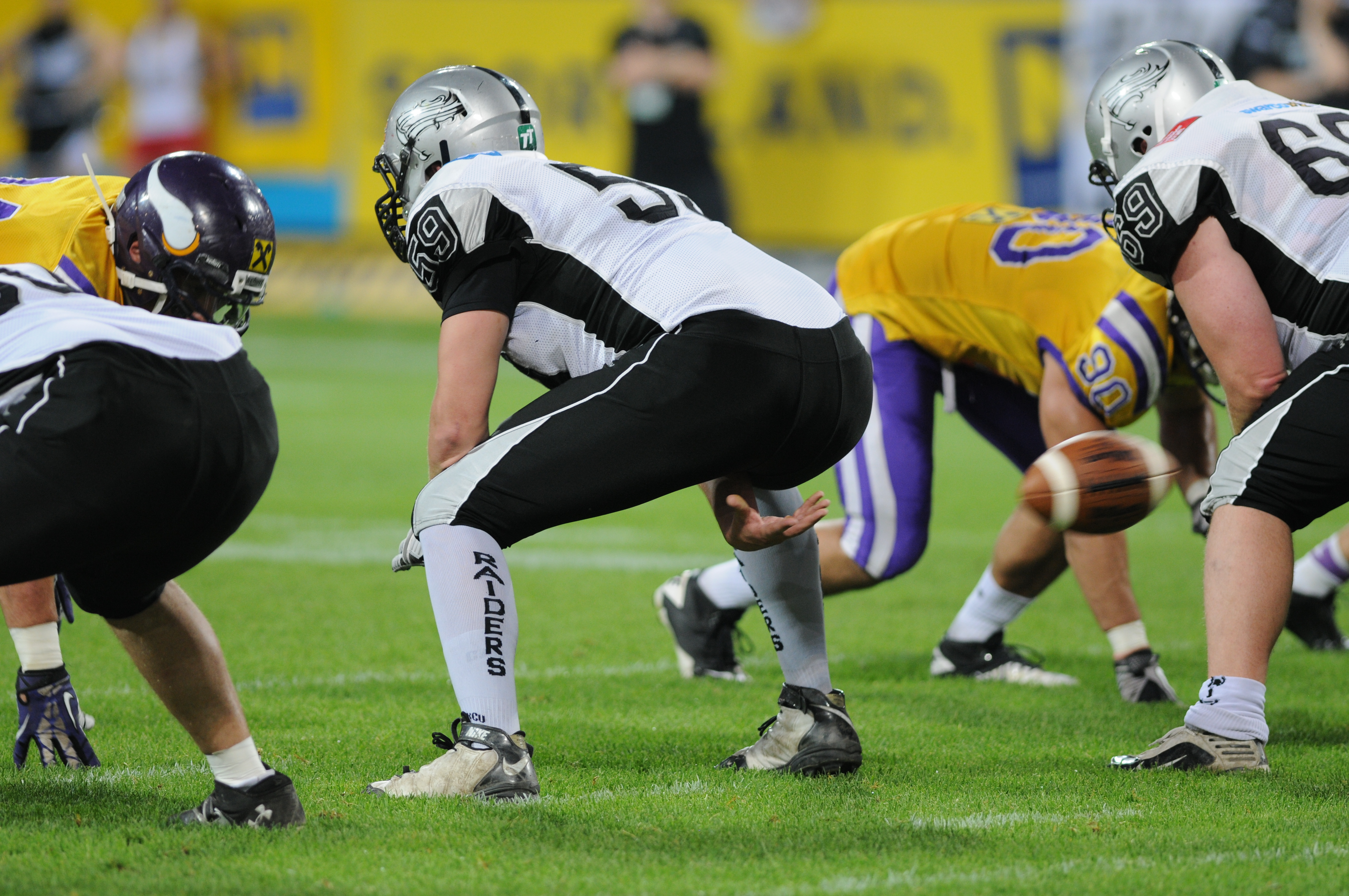
The center snaps the ball between his legs.

A snap (also called a "hike", "snapback", or "pass from center") is the backward passing of the ball in gridiron football at the start of play from scrimmage.

== Action ==
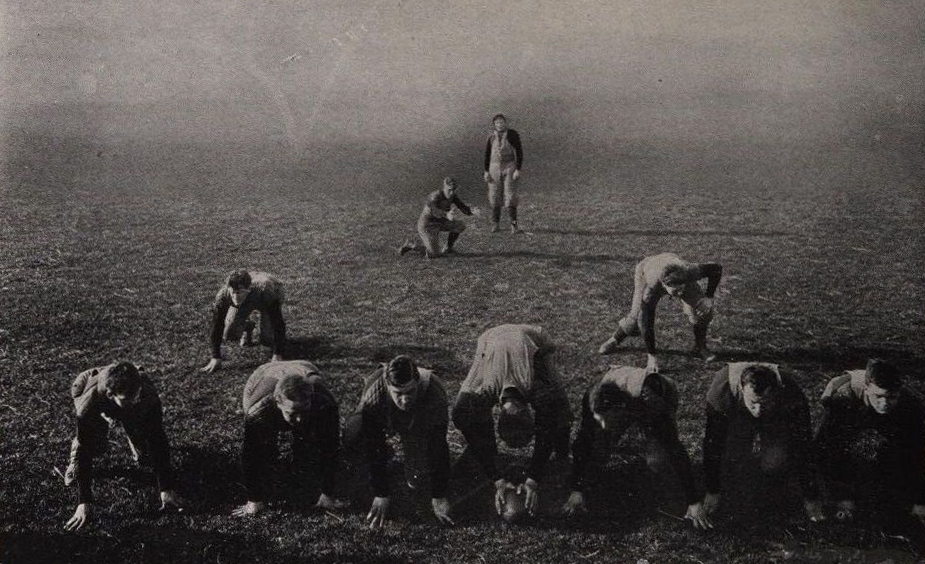
Illustration showing positions of the men just before the ball is passed

The ball begins on the ground with its long axis parallel to the sidelines of the field, its ends marking each team's line of scrimmage in American football; in Canadian football, the line of scrimmage of the team without the ball is 1 yard past their side of the ball. The player snapping the ball (known officially as the "snapper" in rule books) delivers the ball to another player, and that action is the snap. The snapper may hand, throw, or even roll the ball to the other player. The snap must be a quick and continuous movement of the ball by one or both hands of the snapper, and the ball must leave the snapper's hands. The various rules codes have additional requirements, all of which have the effect of requiring the ball to go backward. The snapper almost always passes the ball between his legs, but only in Canadian football is that required.

In the standard gridiron football formation, the center/centre is the snapper and is situated in the middle of the line of scrimmage. Only in arena football is the center required by rule to be the snapper. In other codes, a guard, tackle, running back, tight end or split end can legally deliver the snap; such scenarios, known as an unbalanced line, are seldom used outside of trick plays and novelties.

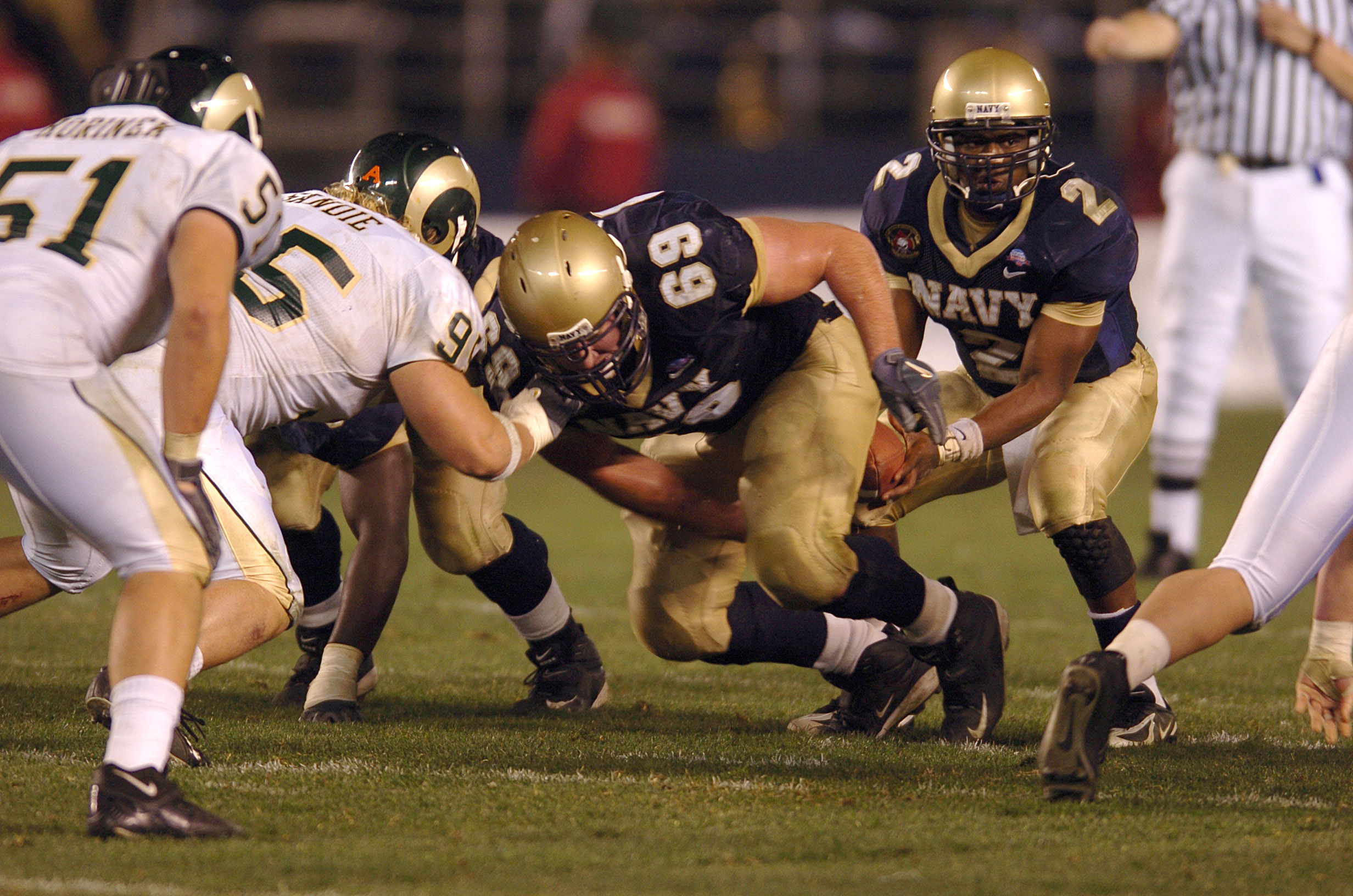
Exchange of the snap between the center's legs

For a handed snap, the snapper will usually have his head up, facing opponents. For a thrown snap, especially in formations wherein the ball may be snapped to players in different positions, the snapper will commonly bend over looking between his legs. Because of the vulnerability of a player in such a position, the National Collegiate Athletic Association (NCAA) and the National Federation of State High School Associations (for high school football sanctioning bodies, otherwise known as the "Fed") have adopted rules providing that if a player is positioned at least seven yards behind the neutral zone to receive a snap, opponents are not to deliberately contact the snapper until one second after the snap (NCAA), or until the snapper has a chance to react (Fed). However, in professional football it is common for a center to be able to practice a single "shotgun" formation thrown snap enough to keep his head up and toss it blindly.

A snap is considered a backward pass, therefore if the ball is snapped and it hits the ground without any player gaining control of the ball the play is ruled as a fumble.

== Snap count ==
The team entitled to snap the ball will usually know in advance the moment when the snap is to occur as one of their players calls out signals, which usually include a loud sound such as "hut" voiced one or more times, the number of which they know; they are thus said to know the "snap count". Therefore, they have a considerable advantage over their opponents. The center is not, however, allowed to make motions simulating part of the snap-action; therefore their opponents can be confident the first motion of the ball or the center's hands is the beginning of the snap.

The snap count is decided on in the huddle, usually expressed as "...on <number>." being the final words spoken by the quarterback after calling the play but before the huddle breaks and the players go to the line of scrimmage. The snap count allows offensive players to have a small head start. The defensive players want to predict the snap, and build up speed such that they cross the line of scrimmage exactly as the play begins, to increase their chances of getting a tackle for a loss or a sack. By varying the snap count, a quarterback forces the defensive players to react to the movement of the offensive players, or risk being called for an offsides or encroachment penalty. Unfortunately for the offense, this advantage can sometimes become a disadvantage. When faced with an exceptionally loud stadium, players may be unable to hear the snap count and are forced to concentrate more on visual cues (silent snap count or a hard count), or risk false start penalties.

The offense must also be mindful of the play clock. If they fail to snap the ball in time they incur a delay of game penalty. Also, with a dwindling play clock, the defense has better chances of guessing when the ball will be snapped. It is easier to predict when the ball will be snapped with 2 seconds left on the play clock, rather than 5 seconds.

The defensive team is not allowed to simulate, by calling out numbers, the offense's snap count. Successfully simulating the count would cause members of the offensive team to act too early ruining co-ordination of the play and inviting penalties. Current rules, unlike earlier rules, position officials so far from the line of scrimmage for 50 minutes of the 60-minute game that it is extremely difficult to hear if the defense is simulating the count.

== History and rationale ==
The snap, the set scrum and ruck in today's rugby union, and the play-the-ball in rugby league have common origins in rugby football. As the rules of rugby's scrimmage were written when the game came to North America, they had a significant flaw which was corrected by custom elsewhere, but by the invention of the snap in American football.

The rule adopted by a committee for American football in 1880 first provided for the uncontested right of one side to play the ball by foot (in any direction) for a scrimmage. A certain use of the foot on the ball which had the same effect as heeling it back was known as a "snap". Later in the 19th century, the option of snapping the ball back by hand was added. The option to play the ball with the foot was preserved, however, for several decades, although by early in the 20th century it was restricted to kicking the ball forward. The kick forward in scrimmage was a surprise play that did not work against a prepared defense. Also for several decades alternatives to the scrimmage for playing the ball from across the sideline after it had gone out of bounds—a throw-in or "fair", and "bounding in"—existed. Until well into the 20th century, rather than an official readying the ball for scrimmage, the side entitled to the snap had complete custody of the ball and could snap it from the required spot at any time; for instance, a tackled ball carrier might feign injury, then suddenly snap the ball while recumbent, there being no stance requirement yet. The neutral zone and the right of the center not to be contacted by an opponent before the snap also was not an original feature. As the 20th century drew to a close, the NCAA and National Federation of State High School Associations extended that protection to some time after the snap, in cases where a player is positioned at least 7 yards deep to receive a thrown snap.

Canadian football used the rugby scrimmage unaltered until near the end of the 19th century, when, regionally at first, under the influence of the American scrimmage, the number of players in the scrimmage was limited to three—a "centre scrimmager" bound on either side by props called "side scrimmagers". The centre scrimmager was later renamed the "snap", and in intercollegiate play one side was given the right to put foot to ball first. Beginning regionally again and universally by 1923, the Burnside rules led to the three-man scrimmage being reduced to the centre alone, the number of players on the field being reduced commensurately from 14 to 12, and a snap rule and neutral zone similar to that of American football was adopted. In addition to the between-the-legs requirement noted above, for several years after the adoption of the hand snap, a hand-to-hand snap was illegal, the ball required to be thrown instead, in Canadian football. (Though it was technically legal, the hand-to-hand snap was not used on the American side of the border until the 1930s.) Apparently, a complete break was desired from system of backheeling, and the T formation having gone into eclipse in American football at the time, the Canadian snap was modeled on the formations then in common use in the US, such as the single-wing formation.

The game design rationale for requiring the snap to be a quick and continuous motion to the backfield is to eliminate the need for rules provisions for a live ball in scrimmage. In rugby union the ball may be retained by the forwards and played for a time via the foot in a scrummage (which rugby league has as well) or ruck, or by the hands in a maul, necessitating additional restrictions on play and player positioning during those intervals. In American and Canadian football, the ball as it is put in play is only held in the line (by the center) for a fraction of a second. The uncontested possession also, as Walter Camp pointed out, allows for better offensive and defensive planning by the side entitled to snap the ball and their opposition, respectively. A muffed snap can be recovered by either team.

== See also ==
- Glossary of American football
