= Neutral zone (gridiron football) =

Area where no member of either team may be

In gridiron football, the neutral zone is an area in which no member of either team may be, other than the person holding the ball. The neutral zone only exists in dead ball situations (i.e. when play is not ongoing).

== Description ==
In American football, the neutral zone can be described as the length of the football 11 inches (28 centimeters) from one tip to the other when it is spotted (i.e. placed on a certain spot) on the field prior to the snap of the ball during a scrimmage down. In Canadian football, the neutral zone, formally known in that code as the scrimmage zone, is a full one yard (3 feet or 36 inches) in front of the tip of the ball during a scrimmage down. The snapper (usually the center) is exempt, as he must place his hand on the ball (thus entering the neutral/scrimmage zone) to execute the snap. The one-yard neutral zone is also used in the China Arena Football League and was tested for use in the XFL but eventually rejected.

The neutral zone is much longer for kickoffs, safety kicks and fair catch kicks, where ten yards separates the kicking team from the receiving team. The kicker and, if used, a holder are allowed to enter this neutral zone. In addition to not being allowed to enter the neutral zone before the kick, the kicking team may not recover their own kick until the ball has traveled beyond the neutral zone or has been touched by an opposing player.

Knowing whether the ball has passed beyond the neutral zone or remained in or behind the neutral zone is important during forward pass plays and during scrimmage kicks.

- "Behind the neutral zone" refers to the "offensive" side of the neutral zone.
- "In the neutral zone" refers to the actual neutral zone.
- "Beyond the neutral zone" refers to the "defensive" side of the neutral zone.

In accordance to NFL rules, an additional definition of the neutral zone came into effect after a September 12, 2005, fight between the Philadelphia Eagles' Jeremiah Trotter and the Atlanta Falcons' Kevin Mathis that occurred prior to the opening kickoff. A new rule was instituted that each end of the field from the end zone to the 45-yard line is reserved for one team, and that no player other than a kicker may be between the 45-yard lines prior to the game.
