= False start =

Sporting term

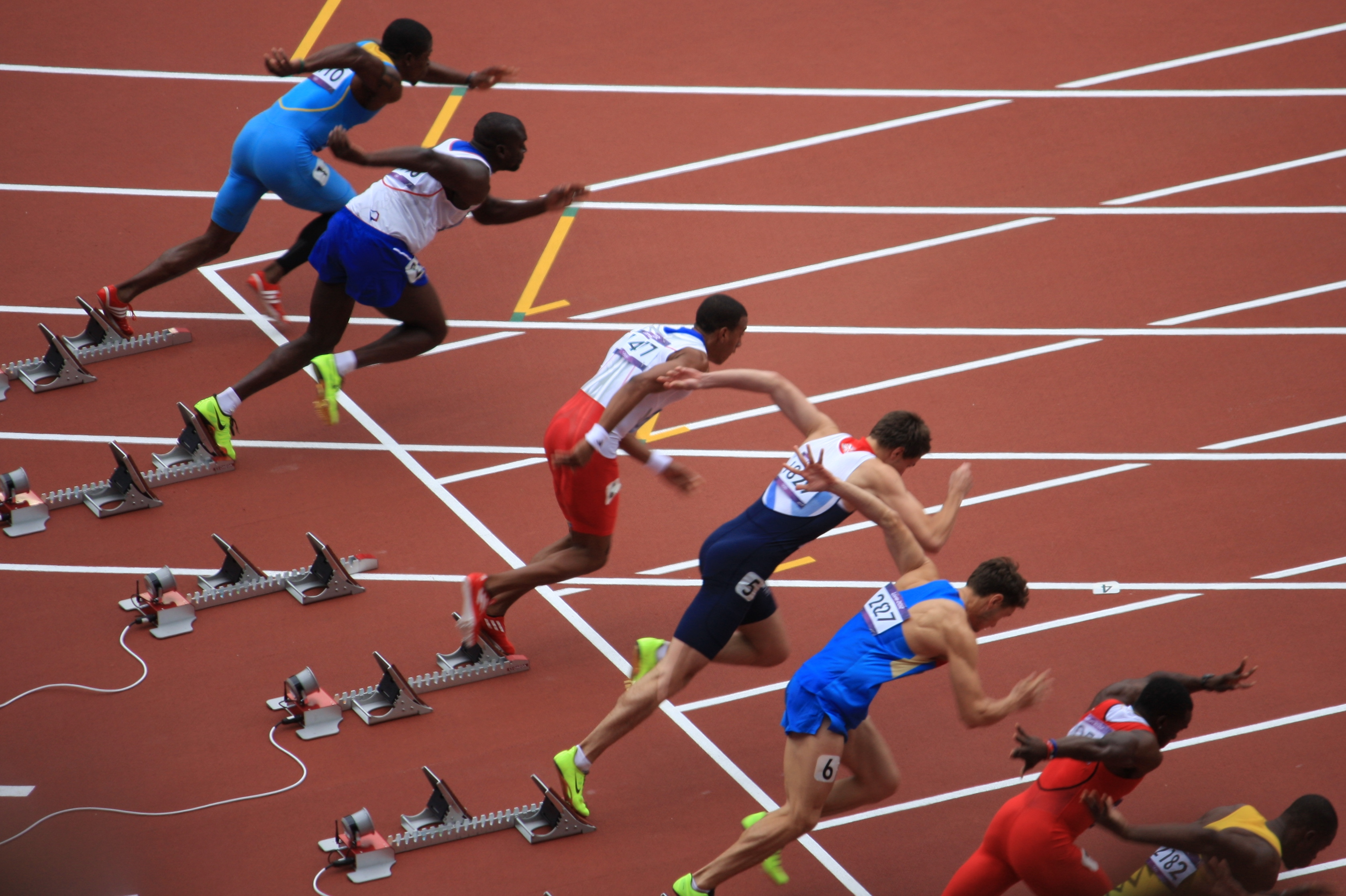
A reduced starting lineup after Kamé Ali was disqualified due to a false start in heat 3 of the men's 110 metres hurdles at the 2012 London Olympics

In sports, a false start is a disallowed start, usually due to a movement by a participant before (or in some cases after) being signaled or otherwise permitted by the rules to start. Depending on the sport and the event, a false start can result in a penalty against the athlete's or team's field position, a warning that a subsequent false start will result in disqualification, or immediate disqualification of the athlete from further competition.

False starts are common in racing sports (such as swimming, track, sprinting, and motor sports), where differences are made by fractions of a second and where anxiety to get the best start plays a role in the athletes' behavior.

A race that is started without a false start is referred to as a fair start or clean start.

== In sports ==
=== Association football (soccer) ===
Football games cannot be restarted unless certain conditions are met. For example, both teams need to be in their own half of the field for the start of the game or restarts from goals or half-time and free kicks require players to be a certain distance from the dead ball position. A referee may call the players back if one or more encroach into the wrong part of the field. There is generally no penalty for this type of encroachment, although if the referee considers it to be delaying the restart of the game they can award a yellow card. One famous example was during the 1974 World Cup when Brazil had a free kick near the Zaire penalty area, but the ball was booted far away by Mwepu Ilunga before the restart. At a penalty kick, the restart is blown by the referee before the actual kick takes place. In this situation, "encroachment" may take place, where one or more players from either side go into the penalty area or penalty arc before the kick is done. The goalkeeper can also be called for this offence if one foot leaves the goal line before the kick. A variety of punishments exist depending on which sides were involved and the result of the kick, or the result may stand if one team defends the kick or scores it but their opposition infringed.

=== American and Canadian football ===
In American football and Canadian football, a false start is movement by an offensive player (other than the center) after he has taken a set position. For offensive linemen, this movement might be as minimal as a couple of centimeters, although the rule's intent is to prevent offensive players from unfairly drawing the defense offside. A false start brings a 5-yard penalty. Unlike an offside penalty, where the play is run as usual, the play after a false start penalty immediately becomes dead. This is done to prevent a defensive player reacting to a false start from hitting the quarterback while he is going through the snap count, which would make the quarterback more susceptible to injury.

At the end of the 2005 NFL season, owners complained regarding false start penalties on players whose flinches have little effect upon the start of the play, such as wide receivers. In response, the NFL competition committee has said that they plan to inflict fewer false start penalties on players who line up behind the line of scrimmage.

In the 2023 season the false start penalty was the most issued penalty in the NFL with 618 penalties being issued for 3,026 penalty yards.

=== Athletics (track and field) ===
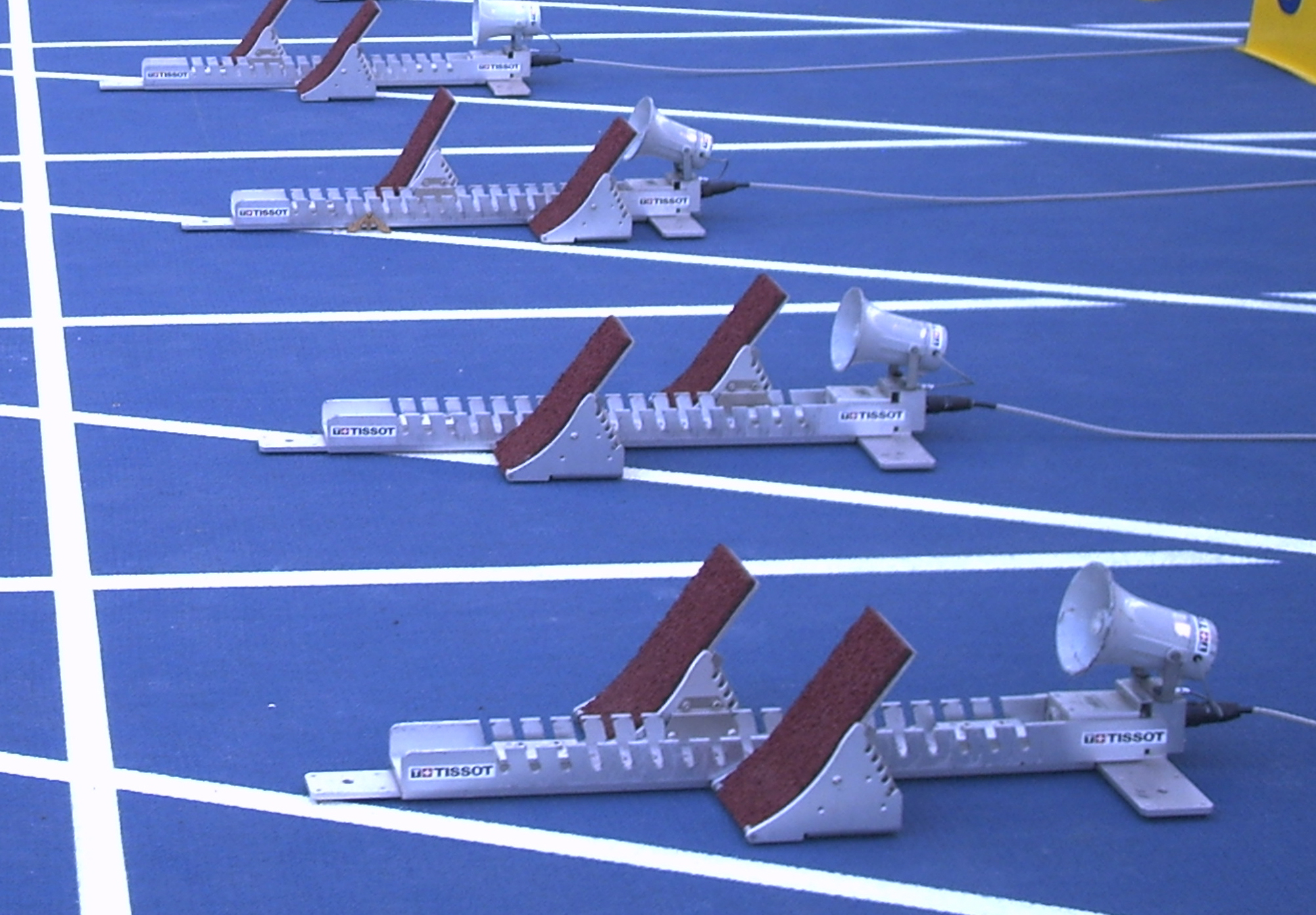
Pressure-sensitive starting blocks at the start line of the 100 metres at the 2007 Pan American Games in João Havelange Olympic Stadium

In track and field sprints, the sport's governing body, World Athletics, has a rule that if the athlete moves within 0.1 seconds after the gun has fired the athlete has false-started. This figure is based on tests that show the human brain cannot hear and process the information from the start sound in under 0.10 seconds, even though a IAAF-commissioned study indicated in 2009 that top sprinters are able to sometimes react in 0.08 seconds. This rule is only applied at high-level meets where fully automated force or motion sensor devices are built into the starting blocks that are tied via computer with the starter's gun. In the vast majority of lower-level meets, false starts are determined visually by the officials.

If there is a false start, it is signaled by firing the starting gun twice, or in electronic timing systems, if the reaction time is less than 0.100 seconds, a false start signal is signalled by the timing system, and the race is stopped. Since 2009, the offending athletes risk immediate disqualification. Before 2003, an athlete making a false start would be allowed another start and would only risk disqualification after a second false start. Between 2003 and 2009 (inclusive), if there was a single false start, then the whole field would be warned, and the original offender would be allowed a second start. If anyone made a false start on the second start, that or those athlete(s) risk disqualification (even if they didn't false start the first time).

An analysis of start times by sprinters at the 2008 Beijing Olympics demonstrated that male and female sprinters can achieve reaction times of 0.109 seconds and 0.121 seconds in one out of 1,000 starts. The same analysis showed fewer false starts among the women and it suggests that the apparent sex difference is caused by the use of the same starting block force threshold for males and females. The authors calculated that were the force threshold to be reduced by 22% for females, to take into account their lower rate of developing muscle strength, then males and females would exhibit similar reaction times and numbers of false starts.

=== Horse racing ===
In thoroughbred horse racing, a false start occurs when a horse breaks through the starting gates before they open. There is usually no penalty, and the horse is simply reloaded into the gate. In some events, a horse who breaks through the starting gates is disqualified. A notable example was the 2006 Preakness Stakes when Kentucky Derby winner Barbaro broke through the gate early; he was reloaded and the race was started properly. The 1993 Grand National was declared void because the recall flag to signal a false start was not unfurled, so that most jockeys continued to race.

=== Ice hockey ===
In ice hockey, a false start occurs when a team commits a faceoff violation. When this occurs, the player taking the face-off from the offending team is disqualified from the face-off and replaced by a teammate. A second faceoff violation by the same team results in a minor penalty.

=== Motorsports ===
In motor sports that have a standing start (e.g. Formula One), if there is a false start then the offender is subject to a time penalty and the race is normally not restarted. One notable exception was the 1999 European Grand Prix, where six drivers, including the top five qualifiers, jumped the start due to the starting lights malfunctioning. No driver was penalized and the race was restarted. In drag racing, if there is a false start, the driver who jumped worse is provisionally disqualified, pending the result of the run (both drivers can commit a false start violation; if a worse violation occurs during the race, that offender instead is disqualified, and the false start is nullified, with that offender declared the winner). In motorsport with a rolling start (lane violations, passing the leader before the start), the penalty may be positions lost or a pass-through penalty.)

=== Sailing ===
In sailing, the race committee decides at the preparatory signal (usually 4 minutes before the start) what the rules on false starting will be by display the P, I, Z or Black Flags.

A P Flag means any boat on the course side (OCS) of the start line at the starting signal must return, clear the start line and then restart. The I Flag means a boat which is OCS must round either end of the start line by coming back to the pre-start side and then restarting (the 'round the ends' rule). The Z Flag means a boat which is OCS in the minute leading up to the start or at the start itself is given a 20% scoring penalty. The Black Flag means a boat which is OCS in the minute leading up to the start or at the start itself is disqualified.

Failing to return to start correctly under the P or I Flag rules means the boat is scored O.C.S and receives points equivalent to disqualification.

=== Skiing/Biathlon ===
The sport's governing body, the FIS, prohibits any athlete from moving before the gun sounds or within 0.1 second after, since 2009. As in track and field, in biathlon or cross country skiing, any false start from any athlete(s) risks immediate disqualification.

=== Speed skating ===
According to the rules set by the ISU a false start occurs when one of more competitors are intentionally slow at taking their starting positions, or leave their starting positions before the shot is fired. The first false start by an athlete will be cautioned, and the next, immediate disqualification.

=== Swimming ===
In swimming, any swimmer who starts before the starting signal risks immediate disqualification. If a step-down command is given before the race starts, the swimmer is not disqualified.

A notable example during the 2008 Olympics occurred when Pang Jiaying was disqualified due to a false start. This allowed Libby Trickett to advance to the final round, in which she won a silver medal.

At the 2012 London Olympics, Chinese swimmer Sun Yang jumped into the water too early in the 1500 m final, but was not judged to have false started because he misunderstood 'stand please' as the start beep by the article 101.1 0.3 D. A similar incident occurred in the women's 100 metre breaststroke final.

=== Triathlon ===
In the men's triathlon at the 2020 Summer Olympics, there was an improper start (commonly reported as a "false start") in the opening 1500 metre swim because a camera boat blocked some of the participants from entering the water, which NBC termed "bizarre".

== In entertainment ==
In a live musical performance, a false start is an intro to a song that is quickly cut short to begin another song. One famous example occurred during a musical performance by Elvis Costello during a 1977 television broadcast of Saturday Night Live. He and his band started to play "Less than Zero," but stopped after a few bars and shifted to "Radio Radio" instead. The incident resulted in Costello being banned from the show until 1989. Another example of a song that starts with one song before quickly cutting to a different song is "Hello" by Oasis, in which Noel Gallagher starts playing "Wonderwall" before the band starts playing "Hello" after a few seconds of "Wonderwall".

False starts, mistakes, or imitations of such, are occasionally included by musicians on finalised albums. The Beatles' songs "Dig a Pony" and the North American version of "I'm Looking Through You" include them. Electric Light Orchestra's "Rockaria!", Green Day's "Good Riddance (Time of Your Life)", "Old Time Rock and Roll" by Bob Seger, "Better Man" by Pearl Jam, "Tangerine" by Led Zeppelin, "Wrong 'Em Boyo" by The Clash, Monkees song "Magnolia Simms", James Blunt's song "You're Beautiful," "Some Girls Are Bigger Than Others" by The Smiths, and "Rock Star (Olympia)" by Hole are some other examples, as well as "I Need A Lover" by John Cougar Mellencamp.
