= Line of scrimmage =

Transverse line in American football

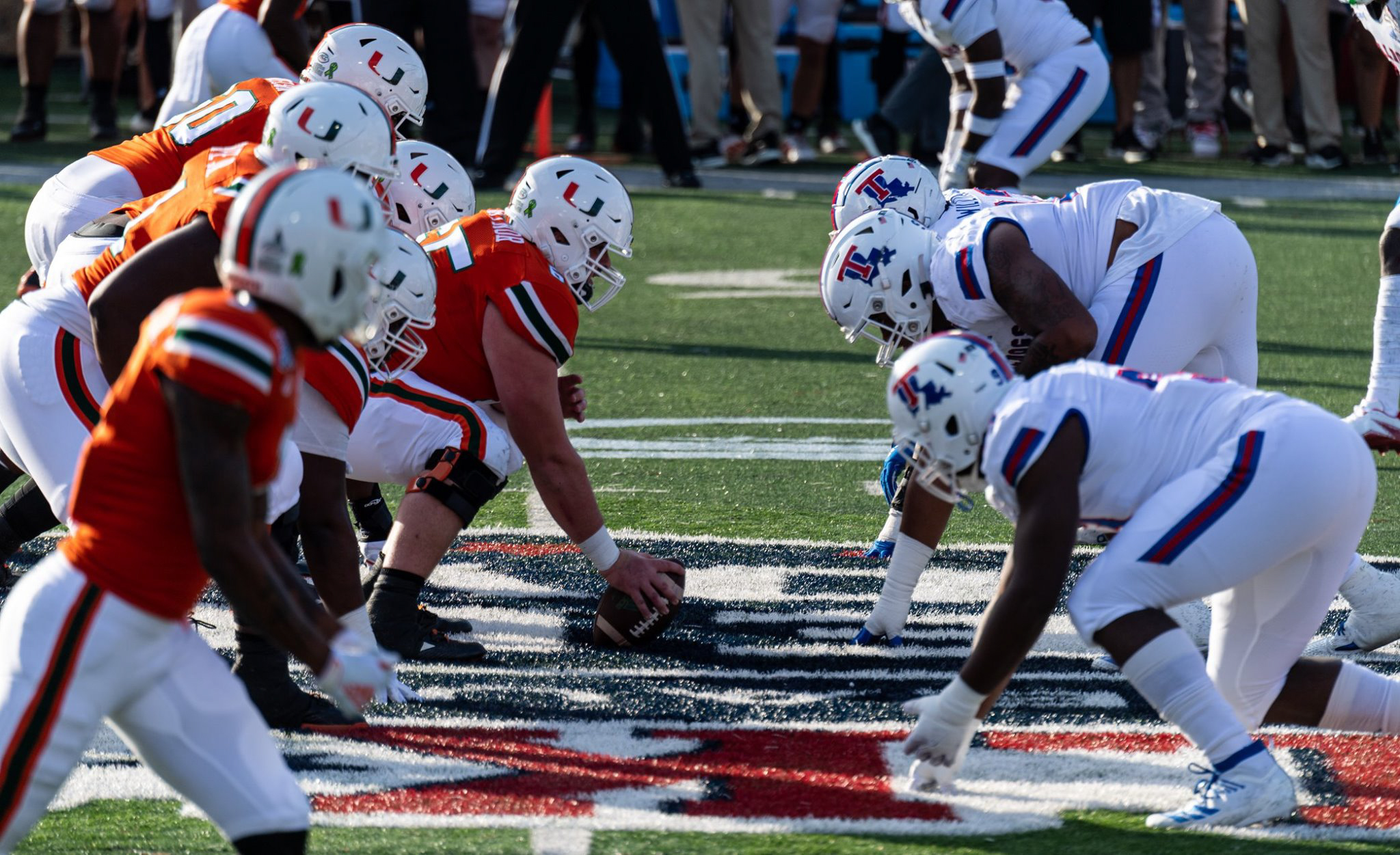
American football line of scrimmage, before a play

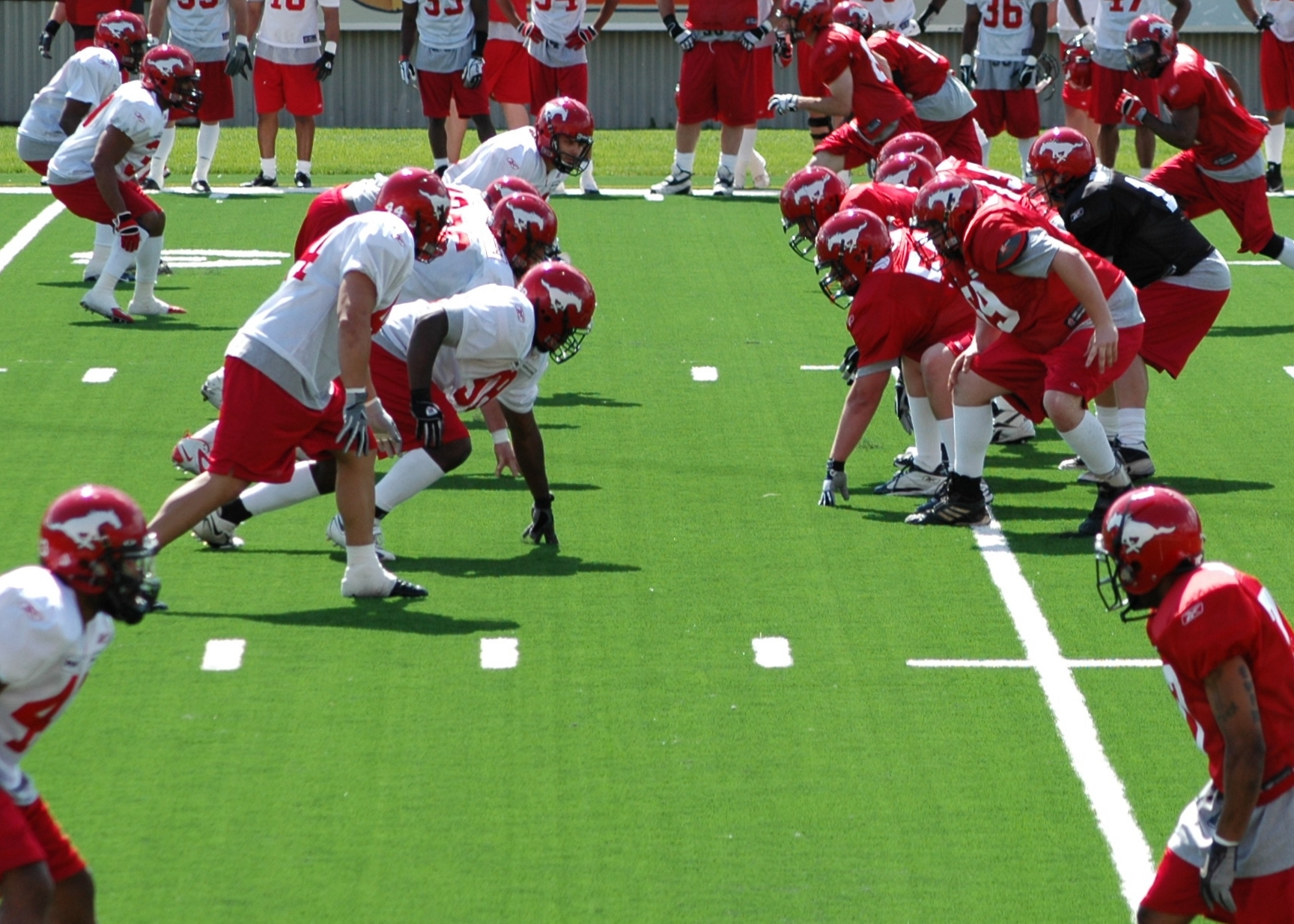
A Canadian football line of scrimmage, before a play.

In gridiron football, a line of scrimmage is an invisible transverse line (across the width of the field) beyond which a team cannot cross until the next play has begun. Its location is based on the spot where the ball is placed after the end of the most recent play and following the assessment of any penalty yards.

== History ==
The line of scrimmage first came into use in 1880. Developed by Walter Camp (who introduced many innovations that are part of the modern game of American football), it replaced a contested scrimmage that had descended from the game's rugby roots. This uncontested line of scrimmage would set into motion many more rules that led to the formation of the modern form of gridiron football (although the Canadian rules were developed independently of the American game, despite their similarities).

== Dimensions ==
A line of scrimmage is parallel to the goal lines and touches one edge of the ball where it sits on the ground before the snap. In American football, the set width of the line of scrimmage between the offense and defense is 11 inches (28 cm), the length of the ball. In Canadian football, the set distance of the line of scrimmage is 1 yard (91 cm), more than three times as long as the American line.

Under NCAA, and NFHS rules, there are two lines of scrimmage at the outset of each play: one that restricts the offense and one that restricts the defense. The area between the two lines (representing the length of the ball as extended to both sidelines) is called the neutral zone.

== Rules regarding the line of scrimmage ==
- Only the offensive player who snaps the ball (usually the center or long snapper) is allowed to have any part of his body in the neutral zone.
- For there to be a legal beginning of a play, at least seven players on the offensive team, including two eligible receivers, must be at, on, or within a few inches of their line of scrimmage.
- Beginning in 2019, high school football will allow as few as five players on a line of scrimmage, but in practice, the limits will remain the same since teams will still be limited to four persons behind the line of scrimmage; the difference would only come into play if a team plays offense with fewer than 11 players.

== Presentation during broadcasts ==
Modern video techniques enable broadcasts of American football to display a visible line on the screen representing the line of scrimmage. The line is tapered according to the camera angle and gets occluded by players and other objects as if the line were painted on the field. The line may represent the line of scrimmage or the minimum distance that the ball must be moved for the offensive team to achieve a first down.

== Misnomers ==
Many fans and commentators refer colloquially to the entire neutral zone as the "line of scrimmage", although this is technically incorrect. In the NFL rulebook, only the defensive-side restraining line is officially considered a line of scrimmage.

== See also ==
- Scrummage
- Glossary of American football
- Comparison of Canadian and American football
