= Emory and Henry Wasps =

Collegiate sports program

Emory & Henry Wasps
- University: Emory & Henry University
- Nickname: Wasps
- NCAA: Division II
- Conference: South Atlantic (primary)
- Athletic director: Kyle Sensabaugh
- Location: Emory, Virginia
- Varsity teams: 21 (10 men's, 11 women's, 2 co-ed)
- Football stadium: Fred Selfe Stadium at Nicewonder Field
- Basketball arena: Bob Johnson Court at the John Rutledge King Center
- Baseball stadium: Porterfield-DeVault Field
- Softball stadium: Wasps Field
- Soccer stadium: Food City Sports Complex
- Tennis venue: Richardson Tennis Courts
- Colors: Blue and gold
- Mascot: Stinger the Wasp
- Website: www.gowasps.com

The Emory & Henry Wasps, also known as E&H Wasps, are the athletic teams that represent Emory & Henry University, located in Emory, Virginia, in NCAA Division II intercollegiate sports. The Wasps will compete as members of the South Atlantic Conference as they plan to start playing a full SAC schedule in 2022–23. Altogether, Emory & Henry sponsors 26 sports: 11 men's teams, 11 women's teams, and 4 co-ed teams. Emory & Henry previously competed as members of the Old Dominion Athletic Conference (ODAC) of NCAA Division III from 1976–77 to 2020–21.

Emory and Henry adopted the Wasps nickname in 1921. The school's athletic teams has previously been called the Wildcats, Jackrabbits, and Whitetoppers.

== History ==
=== NCAA investigation ===
The Emory & Henry football team came under investigation for alleged violations of NCAA bylaws in 2013-2014. The allegations came to public attention after the resignation of former coach Don Montgomery from the football program and departure of the College's president, Rosalind Reichard. The student newspaper reported that allegations were due to lack of "institutional control" of the athletic department. The NCAA investigation revealed that during the time period of recruitment, two possible football student-athletes of the College's athletics program had gotten extra financial aid in their financial aid packages.

In these cases, the College went away from its standard awarding procedure by modifying an award and including endowed funds as part of the initial financial aid package. Due to these inappropriate financial aid decisions, both of these student-athletes were said to be ineligible to take part in football during the 2012 and 2013 seasons.

=== Mascot ===
The official Emory & Henry mascot is the Wasps. While there are many rumored origins of the nickname, the most commonly accepted story is that Emory & Henry was first called the Wasps after the football team played the first-ever game in Tennessee's Neyland Stadium by a local Knoxville newspaper. Despite the Volunteers from Tennessee being heavily favored, they only held a 6-0 lead at halftime, this is due to the defensive efforts of Emory & Henry. The local Knoxville newspapers described the college team as the "Wasps" because of the tenacious and swarming defense they displayed, akin to the persistence of wasps in protecting their nest. This description was inspired by the distinctive uniforms worn by the Emory & Henry players, which included blue-gold striped socks and jerseys adorned with blue-gold stripes on the chest and sleeves. Though Emory and Henry was beaten 27–0, legend has it that the local paper declared "that those Virginia boys stung like wasps," and the nickname has stuck ever since.

== Conference affiliations ==
NCAA

- Old Dominion Athletic Conference (1976–2021)
- South Atlantic Conference (2022–present)

== Varsity teams ==
=== List of teams ===
Men's teams

- Baseball
- Basketball
- Cross Country
- Football
- Golf
- Indoor Track & Field
- Lacrosse
- Outdoor Track & Field
- Soccer
- Swimming
- Tennis
- Wrestling

Women's teams

- Basketball
- Cross Country
- Golf
- Indoor Track & Field
- Lacrosse
- Outdoor Track & Field
- Rugby
- Soccer
- Softball
- Swimming
- Tennis
- Volleyball
- Wrestling

Co-ed teams

- Cheerleading
- Dance
- Equestrian (IDA)
- Equestrian (IHSA)

== Football ==
The E&H Wasps are credited with inventing an American football offensive formation, named in the college's honor, that divides the offensive line and wide receivers into three groupings of three. While it is primarily used today as a trick play, it was revived in 2007 as an integral part of the A-11 offense, a high school football offensive scheme that was eventually banned due to the exploitation of loopholes in the high school rulebooks. The offense inspired Steve Spurrier to use variations of it as a trick play formation at Florida and South Carolina named "Emory and Henry", as Spurrier attended Wasps games as a child growing up in nearby Johnson City, Tennessee. The formation is featured on EA Sports' NCAA Football 07 video game as well.

The Emory & Henry football team has won 11 ODAC Conference Championships (more than any other member of the ODAC) since the league's inception in 1976, along with appearing in the 1950 Tangerine Bowl and the 1951 Tangerine Bowl. They have also made it to the 1987 NCAA DIII Semifinal game under coach Lou Wacker before losing to Wagner College, and well as making it to the DIII playoffs numerous times. E&H had the nations longest home game winning streak in 1999 at 37 games. In 2004, Y'all magazine listed Emory and Henry among the 40 colleges and universities in the South with some of the greatest football traditions. "Not to be overshadowed by neighboring Division I powerhouses . . .Winning seasons plus pride and pageantry equals one of the greatest Southern football traditions."

The Wasps football team began play in 1893 beating Virginia Tech 6–0, and have won games against other Division I programs such as Appalachian State, Marshall, The University of Central Florida, and Middle Tennessee State. The Wasps oldest current football rival is Hampden-Sydney College who first played the Wasps in 1922.

Emory and Henry University has had three players drafted to the NFL over the years. The most notable being Sonny Wade (class of '69) who went on to play several years in the CFL.

=== NCAA Division III playoff appearances ===
Year	Round	Opponent	Result
1986	First Round	Salisbury State	L 10–14
1987	First Round; Quarterfinals; Semifinals	Ferrum; Washington & Jefferson; Wagner	W 49–7; W 23–16; L 13–20
1992	First Round; Quarterfinals	Thomas More; Washington & Jefferson	W 17–10; L 15–51
1995	First Round	Washington & Jefferson	L 16–35
2000	First Round	McDaniel	L 14–38
Playoff Record (8 games total)			3–5
