= List of football formations =

List of football formations may refer to:

- Formation (association football)
- List of formations in American football
