= A-11 Football League =

Football League

- Sport: American football
- Founded: 2013
- First season: 2014 (planned)
- Folded: 2014
- CEO: Scott McKibben
- No. of teams: 8
- Country: United States
- Broadcaster: ESPN
- Website: A11FL.com

The A-11 Football League (A11FL) was a proposed professional American football minor league that was announced in 2013 and originally planned on beginning play in 2014 but folded before taking the field. The A11FL planned on playing a spring and summer schedule using modified National Football League rules that allowed for the A-11 offense, a system which potentially allows "All 11" offensive players to be eligible receivers, thus creating a more wide-open game. The A11FL introduced six of its eight planned franchises in April 2013 and announced a seventh proposed team several months later. The franchises were to be distributed in major markets across the United States, with five of the seven teams reviving names of franchises in the United States Football League of the 1980s.

Later in 2013, the A11FL announced its intention to play two televised "showcase games" in the spring of 2014 and delay its first full season until 2015. However, in April 2014, the league announced that it would move its two planned California franchises to as of yet undetermined cities while postponing its showcase games indefinitely, though it still planned to kick off its first season with eight teams in the spring of 2015.

The A11FL unofficially ended in July 2014, when the league made this statement via its Facebook page: "(T)he folks who were involved with the A11FL investment team have been actively working on financing for a new Professional Spring Football League that will no longer be branded as the A11FL... More news as it comes available." Although no further updates were announced, former league officials Kurt Bryan and Scott McKibben were named head coach and team president of the expansion Oakland Panthers of the Indoor Football League in 2019.

== History ==
=== Previous spring football leagues ===
There had been numerous attempts to establish a spring football league in the last forty years, the best-known being the United States Football League (1983–85), the NFL-sponsored WLAF/NFL Europe (1991–92 and 1995–2007); and the XFL (2001). Others include the Professional Spring Football League (PSFL), which folded before playing any games in 1992; the Regional Football League (RFL), which lasted a single season in 1999; the Spring Football League (SFL), which played just four games in 2000; and the Stars Football League, which intended to be a national league but spent most of its three-year existence (2011–13) as a regional semi-pro league based in Florida. (Several other proposed spring leagues never got past the planning stage; for instance, the International Football Federation was set to begin play in 2000, but never made it past their initial press conference.)

=== Development ===
==== A-11 offense ====
California high school football coaches Kurt Bryan and Steve Humphries developed the A-11 offense in the mid-2000s by using a loophole in rules concerning allowable punting formations to design an offensive scheme in which "All 11" players were potentially eligible receivers. While some high school coaches began to adopt the offense, many more felt that it was "unsportsmanlike" and "against the spirit of the rules". In 2009, the loophole which allowed the A-11 to be used was closed by the National Federation of State High School Associations by a 46–2 vote. In 2011, Bryan and Humphries began planning a professional football league that allowed the A-11 offense, which they felt made for a safer and more wide-open game.

==== Introduction and TV deal ====
The creation of the A11FL was announced on April 16, 2013, with a call for investments and business partners. The league was designed to start as single-owner entity in which all franchises were to be owned and operated by the league office.

At press conference on February 6, 2014, A11FL commissioner Scott McKibben announced six of its eight inaugural teams, leaving the final two teams and home stadiums to be announced at a later date. At the same press conference, McKibben announced that the league had reached an agreement with ESPN to broadcast two "showcase games" and the 2015 regular season. The showcase games were scheduled to be played at Raymond James Stadium in Tampa in May 2014 and at the Cotton Bowl in Dallas in June 2014.

==== Time out / folding ====
The league announced via Twitter on March 28, 2014, that it would be redirecting efforts towards a "new opportunity" that would "secure the formation of the league for many years". On April 11, 2014, the league announced via Facebook that "things are coming together just as we said in our announcement. No need to read between the lines. Big news ahead." Later that same April, the A11FL canceled its two showcase games and announced that previously introduced franchises in San Francisco and Los Angeles would not be included in the league due to the cost of workers' compensation insurance in California. However, commissioner McKibben stated at the time that the A11FL still planned on fielding eight teams for its inaugural season, which was still planned for the spring of 2015.

On July 9, 2014, the league announced via Facebook that it was dropping the A11FL name and the A-11 offense and would attempt to "rebrand" as a "new league", effectively folding the A11FL. The league released what would have been the logos for the eight originally proposed teams on December 28, 2014, in an effort to promote the graphic design company that had designed the logos. In February 2015, the A11FL announced via Facebook that officials of the league were planning on organizing a different football league not based on the A-11 offense. No further plans or news about the proposed league have been announced since then, though former league officials Kurt Bryan and Scott McKibben were named head coach and team president of the Oakland Panthers (now the Bay Area Panthers), an expansion team in the Indoor Football League.

== Key personnel ==
- Fred Walker – Chairman
- Scott McKibben – CEO/Commissioner
- Mike Keller – President & COO
- Kurt Bryan – Founder & Executive VP of League Development
- Steve Humphries – Founder
- Chris Schuring – CTO

== Clubs ==
The league had announced seven of its eight planned teams before pulling franchises in Los Angeles and Oakland due to California's workers compensation laws. The name and location of the eighth planned franchise had yet to be announced when the league folded. Five of the proposed clubs borrowed names and design elements from franchises in the 1980s United States Football League which would have been a very controversial move, adding the risk of legal copyright owner and logo issues. The Sea Lions and Staggs were the two exceptions, with newly created original names. (The USFL names were later acquired by The Spring League as part of a plan to launch its own USFL revival in 2022.)

Team	City	Proposed stadium (capacity)	Proposed debut
Bay Area Sea Lions	San Francisco, California	To be determined	2015 (dropped in 2014)
Chicago Staggs	Chicago, Illinois	Soldier Field (63,500)	2015
Dallas Wranglers	Dallas, Texas	Cotton Bowl (92,100)	2015
Denver Gold	Denver, Colorado	To be determined	2015
Los Angeles Express	Los Angeles, California	To be determined	2015 (dropped in 2014)
Michigan Panthers	Detroit, Michigan	To be determined	2015
New Jersey Generals	East Rutherford, New Jersey	MetLife Stadium (82,566)	2015
Philadelphia Stars	Philadelphia, Pennsylvania	To be determined	2015
Tampa Bay Bandits	Tampa, Florida	Raymond James Stadium (65,890)	2015
