= NFL uniform numbers =

Aspect of American football

Players in the National Football League (NFL) wear uniform numbers between 0 and 99, with no two players on a team able to wear the same number outside of the offseason. Rules exist which tie a player's number to a specific range of numbers for their primary position. Additionally, rules exist which limit who may handle the ball on offense: generally players who are designated as offensive linemen, who wear numbers 50–79, are not allowed to handle the ball during a play from scrimmage, though they are allowed to do so if they report to the referee as playing out of position for a tackle-eligible play, if they pick up a fumble, or if they catch a deflected pass. The NFL's system, while having become more lenient since 2021, remains more rigid than other levels of football, which outside of offensive lineman wearing 50–79 are generally nonrestricted, especially on defense.

== History ==
=== Prior to 1973 ===
The earliest numbering systems were significantly different from the modern variation. Until the 1920s, when the NFL limited its rosters to 22 players, it was rare to see player numbers much higher than 25 (Red Grange was a notable exception, wearing 77 with the Chicago Bears while playing halfback, which would not be allowed under current NFL rules), and numbers had little correlation with positions (in 1929, the Orange Tornadoes subverted the system even further, experimenting with using letters instead of numbers).

The numbering system used today originated when all teams employed some variation of the single wing formation on offense. When teams switched to the T-formation in the 1930s and 1940s, the numbers were taken with them to whichever position evolved from the old single wing position. This numbering system originated in college football and was used only informally in the NFL until 1952; the backs were given numbers in the 10–49 range and the offensive line numbers in the 50–89 range. Earlier, defensive players wore numbers that reflected their offensive position, as many players played both offense and defense. For example, quarterbacks and halfbacks usually played in the defensive back field and so had numbers in the 10–49 range, defensive line numbers ranged from 50–89, while linebackers (who often played fullback or tight end on offense) could have just about any number. Split ends (precursors to modern wide receivers) had numbers in the 80s, and many would play cornerback (e.g., Night Train Lane, who wore 81 as a cornerback).

The All-America Football Conference (AAFC) of the 1940s, which later merged with the NFL, had a different numbering system with quarterback in the 60–69 range (Otto Graham), fullbacks in the 70–79 range (Marion Motley), halfbacks in the 80–89 (Don Greenwood) and 90–99 range (Tommy Colella), ends in the 50–59 range (Mac Speedie), tackles in the 40–49 range (Lou Groza), guards in the 30–39 range (Bill Willis), and centers in the 20–29 range (Frank Gatski). When the AAFC merged with the NFL in 1950, the AAFC players kept their old uniform numbers, which caused confusion and resulted in the NFL going to a standard numbering system in 1952. This resulted in many star players having to change their numbers mid-career. Examples are Otto Graham going from 60 to 14, Norm Van Brocklin going from 25 to 11, Marion Motley going from 76 to 36, and Tom Fears going from 55 to 80.

The American Football League (AFL) of the 1960s, which also later merged with the NFL, used essentially the same numbering system as the NFL with some exceptions, mostly pertaining to wide receivers, who were allowed to wear numbers in the teens and 20s (as the AFL had a greater priority toward offense, the league often made use of flankers, receivers positioned in the backfield). The AFL's numbering system also allowed for the use of a double-zero as a number, which was used by future Hall of Fame player Jim Otto, center for the Oakland Raiders; after wearing the number 50 in his rookie season, he switched to 00 (which was said as 'aught, oh', a homonym of Otto), which he wore for the remainder of his career.

=== 1973 standardization ===
The NFL imposed a more rigid numbering system in 1973. When it went into effect, players who had played in the league before the 1973 season were given a grandfather clause to continue wearing their now-prohibited numbers. Pro Football Hall of Fame wide receiver Charlie Joiner was the last player covered by the clause, wearing number 18 through the 1986 NFL season, after which he retired (Under the current jersey system, Joiner's #18 would have been allowed for a wide receiver to wear). Joiner was also the last active player who began his career in the AFL. The last player to be grandfathered who wore a number that would not have been allowed under the current jersey system was Julius Adams, who retired in 1985 wearing the number 85 as a defensive end, although Adams did return to play in 1987 wearing the number #69.

=== 1973–2020 ===
From 1973 to 2020, five major changes were made. In 1979, the NFL allowed defensive linemen to wear numbers 90–99 and centers 60–79. In 1984, the NFL allowed linebackers to wear jersey numbers in the 90–99 range, since more teams were making use of the 3–4 defense and thus were quickly exhausting numbers for linebackers, who previously were only allowed to wear numbers in the 50–59 range. Another change occurred in 2004, when the NFL allowed wide receivers to wear numbers 10–19 in addition to the previous 80–89 range; this was due to several NFL teams retiring 80-range numbers, as well as teams employing more receivers and tight ends in their offense. Since 2010, defensive linemen are allowed to wear numbers 50–59; this is in part because of the interchangeability of linebackers and defensive ends (a defensive end in a 4–3 defense would be an outside linebacker in a 3–4 defense). In 2015, the NFL Competition Committee allowed linebackers to wear numbers from 40–49.

=== 2021–2023 expansions ===
In 2021, NFL owners passed a rule expanding available numbers and simplifying the numbering system. The changes included allowing running backs, tight ends, fullbacks, H-backs and wide receivers to wear numbers 1-49 and 80-89; defensive backs were permitted to choose from 1-49; linebackers 1-79 and 90-99; offensive linemen 50-79; and defensive linemen 50-79 and 90-99. QBs, kickers and punters remained from 1-19. In 2023, a playing rule was passed allowing players to wear the jersey number 0, and kickers and punters were given eligibility to use numbers 20–49 and 90–99.

== Current system ==
| Number range | QB | RB | WR | TE | OL | DL | LB | DB | K / P | LS |
|---|---|---|---|---|---|---|---|---|---|---|
| 0–9 | Yes | Yes | Yes | Yes | No | Yes | Yes | Yes | Yes | Yes |
| 10–19 | Yes | Yes | Yes | Yes | No | Yes | Yes | Yes | Yes | Yes |
| 20–29 | No | Yes | Yes | Yes | No | Yes | Yes | Yes | Yes | Yes |
| 30–39 | No | Yes | Yes | Yes | No | Yes | Yes | Yes | Yes | Yes |
| 40–49 | No | Yes | Yes | Yes | No | Yes | Yes | Yes | Yes | Yes |
| 50–59 | No | No | No | No | Yes | Yes | Yes | No | No | Yes |
| 60–69 | No | No | No | No | Yes | Yes | Yes | No | No | Yes |
| 70–79 | No | No | No | No | Yes | Yes | Yes | No | No | Yes |
| 80–89 | No | Yes | Yes | Yes | No | No | No | No | No | Yes |
| 90–99 | No | No | No | No | No | Yes | Yes | No | Yes | Yes |

The numbers used relate to the player's primary position when they are first assigned a number. If they later change positions, they can keep their prior number, provided they have spent at least one season at their original position, unless it conflicts with the eligible receiver rule; that is, only players that change positions from an eligible position (such as receiver or back) to an ineligible position (such as an offensive lineman) are required to change numbers if they change position. An example of this is running back Ty Montgomery, who wore number 88 throughout his NFL career because he began his career as a wide receiver. Devin Hester is another example; he was originally drafted as a cornerback and was allowed to keep his number 23 when he converted to a wide receiver. Some receivers have worn jersey numbers in the nineties such as Mike Ditka wearing 98 for the Philadelphia Eagles and Keith Ortego wearing 96 for the Chicago Bears.

Additionally, during a game a player may play out-of-position, but only after reporting in to the officials, who will announce to the stadium that a specific player number has reported in (for example, "Number 61 has reported as an eligible receiver") to alert the opposing team, other officials, and the audience that a player is legally out-of-position. A 2015 rule clarification made it illegal to use unusual formations (such as a tackle split wide in the slot position, but still "covered" by a wide receiver) to obscure who is and is not eligible based on uniform numbers without having to report ineligible numbers.

Long snappers typically will wear 40–59, with some exceptions. Long snappers, despite being an official roster position, do not have an official rule for their numbers in the rule book.

The rulebook also allows players to appeal for exemptions to the numbering rules directly to the commissioner's office, which may grant such exceptions on occasion.

== Retired numbers ==
Many NFL teams have retired some numbers in honor of the team's best players. Generally when a number is retired, future players for the team may not wear it. The NFL officially discourages (but does not prevent) teams from retiring numbers, as the limited number of uniform numbers available for each position can be depleted. Some teams will hold official "number retirement" ceremonies, others have "informally" retired numbers by simply not issuing them. For teams that do not retire uniform numbers, they often honor players in other ways, such as team halls of fame or the like.

== Numbers 0 and 00 ==
Following the NFL number standardization of 1973, numbers 0 and 00 were no longer eligible to be issued by teams. Prior to the 1973 standardization, some players had made occasional use of both 0 and 00. Quarterback Johnny Clement, running back Johnny Olszewski, and safety Obert Logan all wore a single-0 jersey in the NFL. Author George Plimpton wore 0 during a brief preseason stint at quarterback for the Detroit Lions. Linebacker Bryan Cox wore 0 in the 2001 preseason with the New England Patriots; for the regular season, he switched to 51. In addition to Jim Otto, wide receiver Ken Burrough of the Houston Oilers and halfback Steve Bagarus of the Washington Redskins and Los Angeles Rams also wore the number 00 during their NFL careers. The three of them remain the only NFL players to have ever worn 00.

Starting with the 2023 season, the number 0 was once again allowed to be issued to any player except offensive and defensive linemen. Notable players who switched to number 0 include running back D'Andre Swift of the Philadelphia Eagles, wide receiver Calvin Ridley of the Jacksonville Jaguars, and linebacker Roquan Smith of the Baltimore Ravens. In all, 12 players chose to don number 0 in 2023. The number 00 remains prohibited.
