= List of formations in American football =

The following is a list of common and historically significant formations in American football. In football, the formation describes how the players in a team are positioned on the field. Many variations are possible on both sides of the ball, depending on the strategy being employed. On offense, the formation must include at least seven players on the line of scrimmage, including a center to start the play by snapping the ball.

There are no restrictions on the arrangement of defensive players, and, as such, the number of defensive players on the line of scrimmage varies by formation.

== Offensive formations ==
This list is not exhaustive; there are hundreds of different ways to organize a team's players while still remaining within the "7 on the line 4 in the backfield" convention. Still, this list of formations covers enough of the basics that almost every formation can be considered a variant of the ones listed below.

=== T formation ===
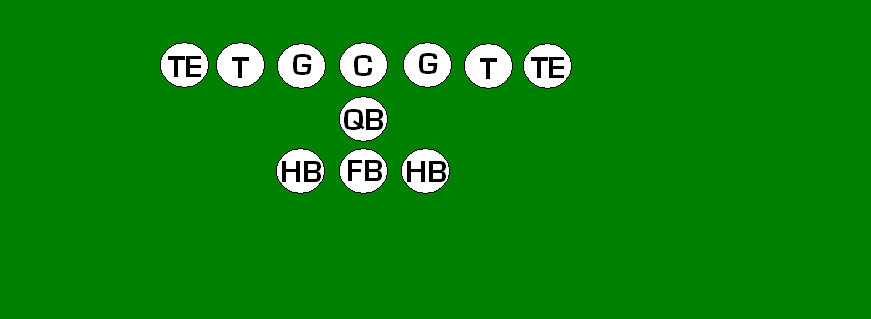
The T-formation, one of the most basic formations in football

The T formation is the precursor to most modern formations in that it places the quarterback directly under center (in contrast to its main competitor of its day, the single wing, which had the quarterback receiving the ball on the fly).

It consists of three running backs lined up abreast about five yards behind the quarterback, forming the shape of a T. It may feature two tight ends (known as the Power T) or one tight end and a wide receiver (in this case known as a split end). When legendary coach George Halas' Chicago Bears used the T-formation to defeat the Washington Redskins by a score of 73–0 in the 1940 NFL championship game, it marked the end of the single wing at nearly all levels of play, as teams, over the course of the 1940s, moved to formations with the quarterback "under center" like the T. George Halas is credited with perfecting the T formation.

One variation of the T Formation would be where all the running backs would be closer than usual, being at fullback depth rather than halfback depth. Another variation of the "balanced T" formation is the so-called "unbalanced T" formation. In this configuration the line of scrimmage has an end and tackle left of center, while to the right of the center are two guards, a tackle, and an end. This creates a line that is weighted toward the right of the center. With the backfield lining up in the conventional T formation behind the center (quarterback, two halfbacks and fullback), the resulting configuration is "unbalanced" due to the asymmetry of the placement of the linemen. The "split T" spreads the offensive line out over almost twice as much ground compared to the conventional T formation. This causes the defensive line to also spread out, creating gaps the offense can exploit.

=== I formation ===
This was once one of the most common formations used at all levels of football, though it has been superseded over the past decade or so by formations that put the quarterback in the shotgun formation. "The I" consists of two backs lined up behind the quarterback, with the back closest to the quarterback being called the fullback and the back behind the fullback called the running back, tailback, or I-back. The two backs line up either in a line (hence the name of the formation since it looks like a letter I) or with the fullback "offset" to either side. The fourth back is most commonly employed as an extra wide receiver. Here are three diagrams of I-Formation, strong side right (that is, with the tight end lining up to the right, typical for a right-handed quarterback). Notice that the 4th back required by the rules is the set-back wide receiver at the right (called the flanker).

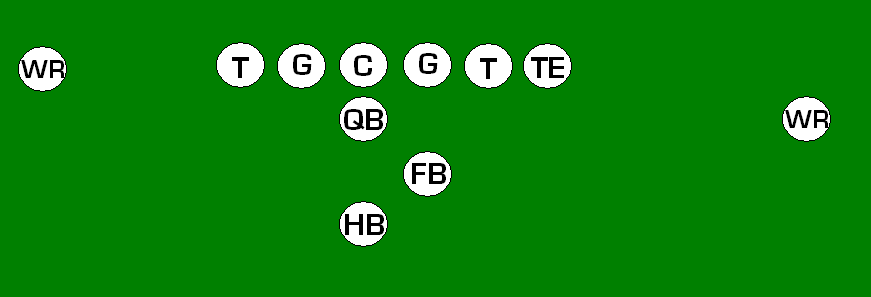
I formation, fullback offset strongside

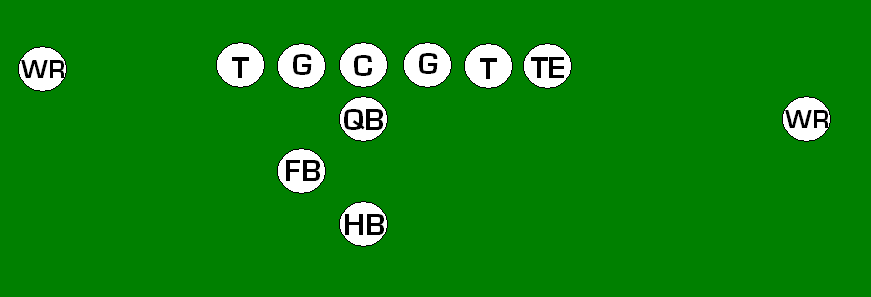
I Formation, fullback offset weakside

Two other I formation variations include the Maryland I and the Power I. These formations lack a flanker, and use the maximum 3 running backs rather than the standard 2. They are used primarily as running formations, often in goal line situations. These may employ either tight ends or split ends (wide receivers) or one of each. The Maryland I was developed by Maryland head coach Tom Nugent. More recently, Utah has utilized this formation with quarterback Brian Johnson.

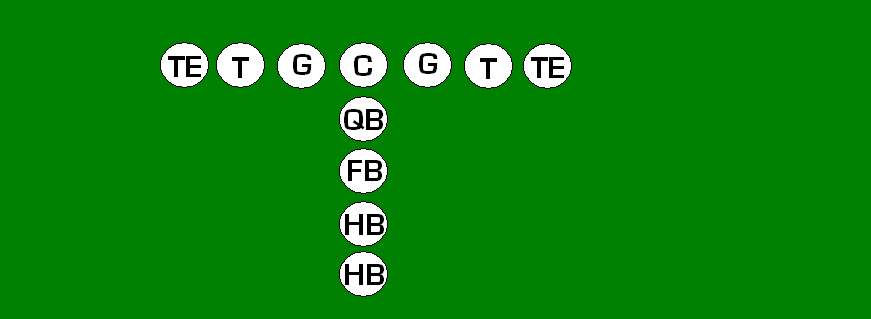
Maryland I

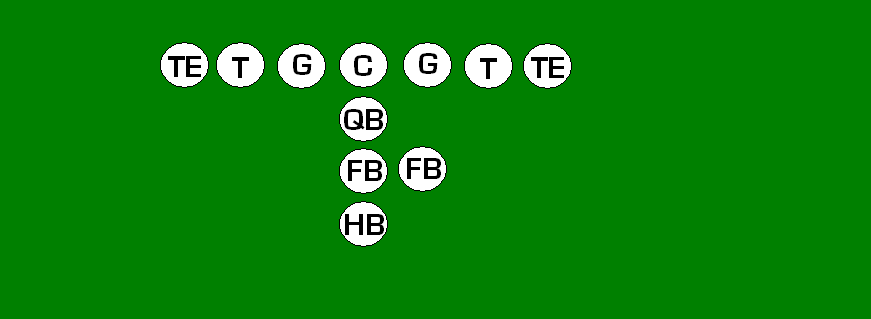
Power I

=== Single set back ===
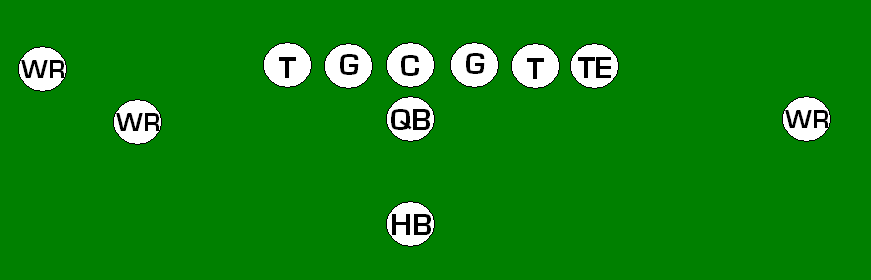
Typical singleback formation

Also known as the "ace" or "singleback" formation, the single set back formation consists of one running back lined up about five yards behind the quarterback. The basic singleback set does not employ a fullback. The other players that are not on the line of scrimmage can either act as tight ends or wide receivers. This formation is normally used for a pass play, but can also be good for running, as defenders must move at least one player out of the middle of the field (the "box", between the tackles on the offensive line) to cover the additional wide receiver or tight end. Since an extra wide receiver is lined up in the space between the tackle or tight end and the outside wide receiver, he is called the slot receiver.

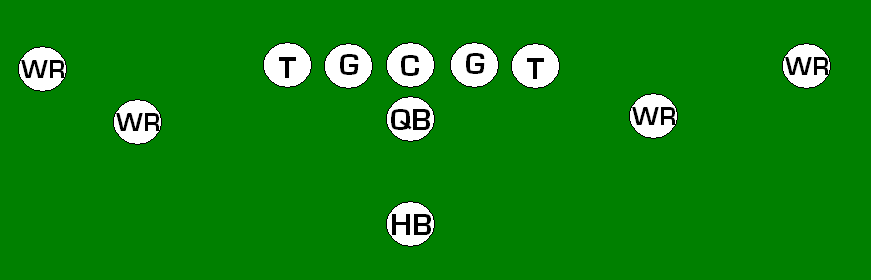
Spread formation

A variation of the ace is known as the spread formation. It utilizes four wide receivers and no tight ends. In the NFL, this formation was the basis of the run and shoot offense that was popular in the 1980s with teams such as the Detroit Lions and the Houston Oilers but has since fallen out of favor as a primary offensive philosophy.

It is often used as a pass formation, because of the extra wide receivers. It also makes an effective run formation, because it "spreads the field" and forces the defense to respect the pass, thus taking players out of the box. Certain college programs, such as the University of Hawaii and Texas Tech still use it as their primary formation. Brigham Young University also uses the spread offense, although they tend to employ their tight ends more frequently than Hawaii and Texas Tech. Minnesota and TCU are also starting to employ the spread offense.

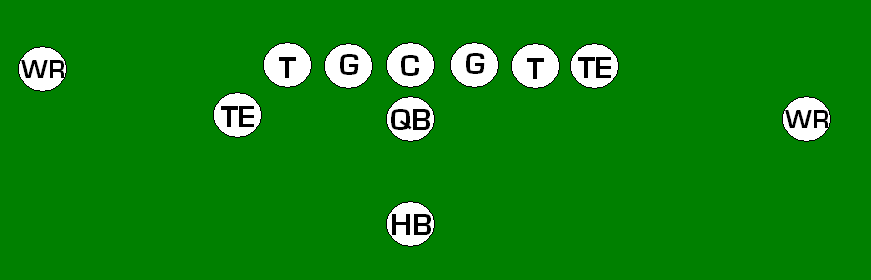
Joe Gibbs's "H-Back" set

Joe Gibbs, twice head coach of the Washington Redskins (now Commanders), devised an ace variation that used a setback, or "flexed" tight end known as an H-back. In this formation, the normal tight-end is almost exclusively a blocker, while the H-back is primarily a pass receiver. This formation is often referred to as a "two tight end" set. Some teams (like the Indianapolis Colts under Tony Dungy) use this formation with both tight ends on the line and use two flankers. Many other teams in the NFL, even those that do not use this as a primary formation, still run some plays using a variant of this formation.

=== Pro set ===
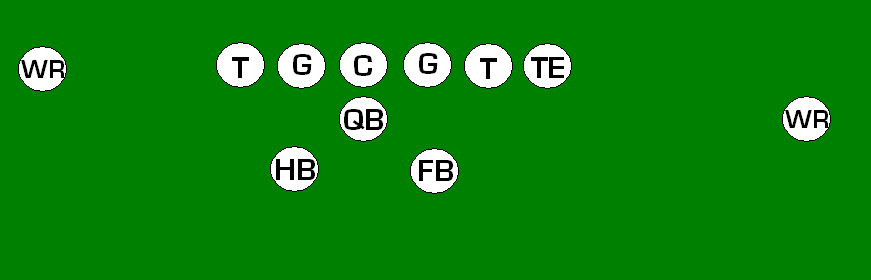
Basic split backs set

Also called the "split backs" or "three-end formation", this is similar to the I-formation and has the same variations. The difference is that the two backs are split behind the quarterback instead of being lined up behind him.

Clark Shaughnessy designed the formation from the T Formation in 1949 after acquiring halfback Elroy "Crazy Legs" Hirsch. Shaughnessy thought he would make a great receiver but already had two great receivers in Tom Fears and Bob Shaw. Schaughnessy moved Hirsch to the flanker position behind the right end. Thus started what was known as the three-end formation.

This formation is most often associated with Bill Walsh's San Francisco 49ers teams of the 1980s and his West Coast Offense. It was also the favored formation of the pass-happy BYU Cougars under the tenure of legendary coach LaVell Edwards. A modern example of the "pro-set" can be seen in the Florida State University offense, which favors a Split Backs formation. The Seattle Seahawks under Mike Holmgren also favored this type of formation with the tight end usually being replaced with a third wide receiver.

=== Single wing ===
Typical Single Wing set. Note the unbalanced line. "C" will snap the ball to either the tailback or fullback, even though he is not strictly in the center. This diagram uses the original terms. The quarterback was used as a blocking back.

This archaic formation was popular for most of the first 50 years of modern American football, but it is rare today, except as a novelty. There are many variations of the single wing with really the only common threads being that, first, rather than lining up "under center", the quarterback (actually called a tailback back in the day) is lined up a few yards behind with running backs generally on one side of him. Second, one of the running backs is stationed outside the end, as a wingback (hence the alternate longer name, "single wingback formation"). It contained two tight ends, and 4 backs. The quarterback in this formation (called at the time a "single-wing tailback"), like today's shotgun QB, received the snap on the fly. The other 3 backs lined up on the same side of the QB in various arrangements. Also, the formation often featured an unbalanced line where the center (that is, the player who snapped the ball) was not strictly in the center of the line, but close to the weakside. The formation was originally designed as a brute-force running formation, since it had 7 players to one side of the center and only 2 on the other.

A well-known variation on the single wing offense would be Knute Rockne's "Notre Dame Box" that he ran with the Four Horsemen. The Notre Dame Box differed from the traditional single-wing in that the line was balanced and the halfback who normally played the "wing" in the single-wing was brought in more tightly, with the option of shifting out to the wing. These two changes made the backs' formation resemble a square (hence the "box") and made the formation less predictable, allowing offenses to run more easily to the "weak" side. Rockne's innovations with this formation involved using complicated backfield shifts and motion to confuse defenses, and adapting it as a passing formation. Teams would often adopt the Notre Dame Box if they lacked a true "triple threat" tailback, necessary for effective single-wing use.

Another variation of the single wing was the A formation.

The single-wing offense has experienced renewed use with high school football programs; because it is so rare, its novelty may contribute to its effectiveness.

=== Wildcat ===
The wildcat is primarily a running formation in which an athletic player (usually a running back or a receiver who runs well) takes the place of the team's usual quarterback in a shotgun formation while the quarterback lines up wide as a flanker or is replaced by another player. The ball is snapped to the runner, who usually has the option of either running the ball himself or handing it to another running back lined up in the backfield. The wildcat gives the runner a good look at the defense before the snap, allowing him to choose the best running lane. It also allows for ten offensive players to block, unlike in a conventional running play, in which the quarterback is usually not involved after delivering the ball to a running back.

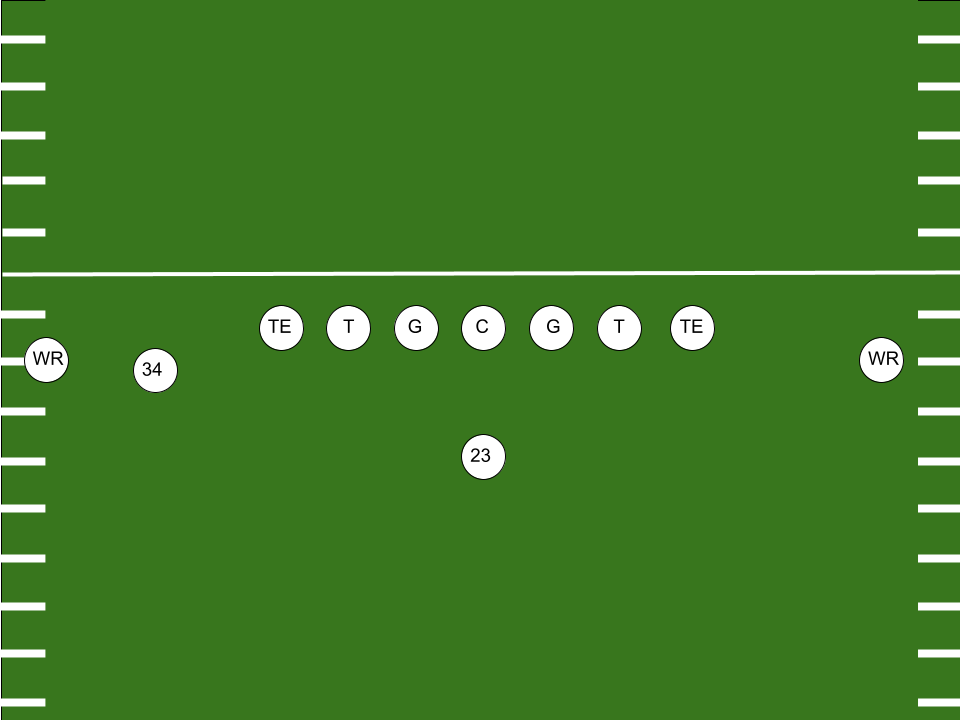
Miami's Wildcat Formation

The wildcat formation is similar to run-oriented formations used during the early days of football, but it had not been seen in the NFL for many years until the Miami Dolphins employed it during the 2008 season with running backs Ricky Williams and Ronnie Brown. The formation was successful, so many NFL and college teams began to incorporate it into their playbooks, often giving it team-specific names such as the "Wildhog" used by the Arkansas Razorbacks, among many other variations. Some attribute the modern origins of the "Wildcat" to Bill Snyder's Kansas State (whose sports teams are known as the "Wildcats") offense of the late ’90s and early 2000s, which featured a lot of zone read runs by the quarterback. Others attribute the origins to Hugh Wyatt, a Double Wing coach (See Double Wing discussion below).

Though the wildcat concept was successful for a time, its effectiveness decreased as defensive coordinators prepared their teams for the change of pace play. The player receiving the snap is usually not a good passer, so defenses can bring linebackers and defensive backs closer to the line of scrimmage to clog potential running lanes. As such, its use has declined since 2009, particularly in the NFL.

=== Double wing ===
The double wing, as a formation, is widely acknowledged to have been invented by Glenn "Pop" Warner in 1912. It then was an important formation up to the T formation era. For example, Dutch Meyer at TCU, with quarterback Sammy Baugh, won a college national championship in 1935 with a largely double wing offense.

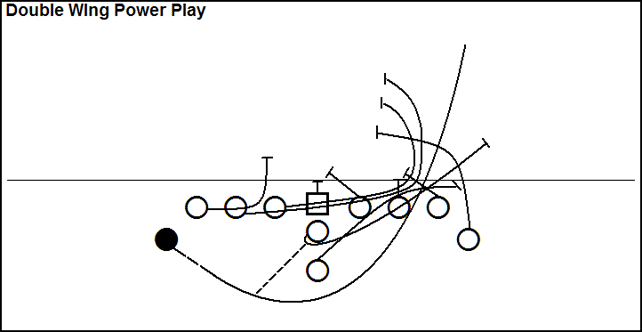
Double Wing Power Play

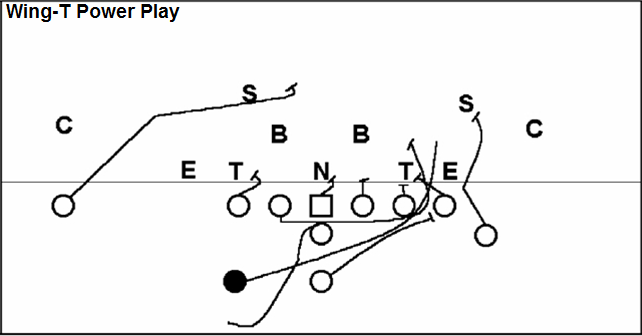
Wing-T Power Play

As a modern offensive system it is widely regarded as the invention of Don Markham, which revolved around the off-tackle power play, power sweep and trap. Markham ran very few plays, but blocked them according to defensive fronts and tendencies. A noticeable difference from the other teams lined up in the double-wing formation was the lack of line splits across the front. The Double Wing is combination of the I, which Markham initially ran the offense from in his earlier days, and the Wing-T 30 Series (Power Series). It is often referred to as the "bastard child of the I and the Wing-T". Breaking numerous state records everywhere Markham coached (and even setting the national high school scoring record) the "Markham Rule" was put into place to keep his team from winning by too many points. He is currently the offensive coordinator at Hillcrest High School in the state of Idaho.

With Markham's success came many converts to his offense and many variations of the offense over the years. Perhaps the most well-known of Markham's converts is Hugh Wyatt, who brought more Wing-T to the offense and a greater ability to market the offense. Jerry Valloton also marketed the offense well when he wrote the first book on the offense. Since that time, Tim Murphy, Steve Calande, Jack Greggory, Robert McAdams, and several other coaches have further developed the offense and coaching materials thereof. Their materials may be seen on their respective websites.

The Double Wing is widely used at the youth level, becoming more popular at the high school level and has been used at the college level by Don Markham at American Sports University.

=== Short punt formation ===
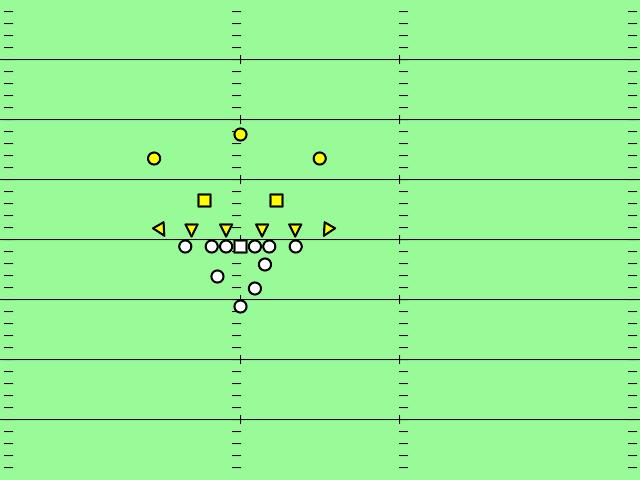
Short Punt formation versus a 6-2-3 defense.

The short punt is an older formation popular when scoring was harder and a good punt was an offensive weapon. In times when punting on second and third down was fairly common, teams would line up in the short punt formation and offer the dual threat of punt or pass. Harper's Weekly in 1915 calls it "the most valuable formation known to football."

The formation differs in two significant ways from the single wing. It is generally a balanced formation, and there are backs on both sides of the tailback, offering better pass protection. As a result, it was considered a much better passing formation than running, as the premiere running formation was the single wing. That said, it was regarded as a good formation for trap plays.

The formation was used extensively by Fielding Yost's Michigan Wolverines in their early history, and was the base formation for the Benny Friedman led New York Giants in 1931. In the 1956 NFL Championship, the Chicago Bears shifted into a short punt formation in the third quarter, after falling way behind.

=== Shotgun ===
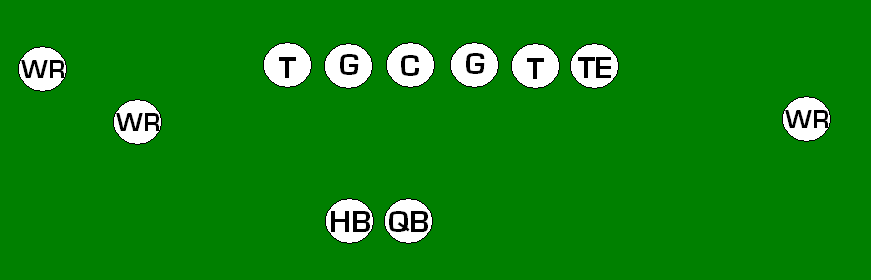
Typical shotgun formation

The modern descendant of the Single Wing. The quarterback lines up about five yards behind the center, in order to allow a better view of the defense and more time to get a pass off. The shotgun can distribute its 3 other backs and 2 ends any number of ways, but most commonly employs one running back, lined up next to the QB, one tight end and three wide receivers. This formation is most commonly used for passing, but the quarterback can also hand off to a running back or run himself. Many college teams use variations of the shotgun as their primary formation, as do a few professional teams, such as the New England Patriots and Indianapolis Colts. Because it is generally more difficult to establish a rushing attack using only the shotgun, most NFL teams save the shotgun for obvious passing situations such as 3rd and long or when they are losing and must try to score quickly.

The Shotgun formation, originally called the Lonesome Quarterback, was an invention by Pop Ivy while coaching in the CFL, although Red Hickey, coach of the San Francisco 49ers is credited with bringing it to the NFL in 1960 and renaming it the Shotgun. Historically, it was used to great success as a primary formation in the NFL by the Hank Stram-led Kansas City Chiefs teams of the 1960s, the Tom Landry-led Dallas Cowboys teams of the 1970s and the 1990s Buffalo Bills teams under Marv Levy, who used a variation known as the K-gun that relied on quarterback Jim Kelly. The shotgun offense became a staple of many college football offenses beginning in the 1990s.

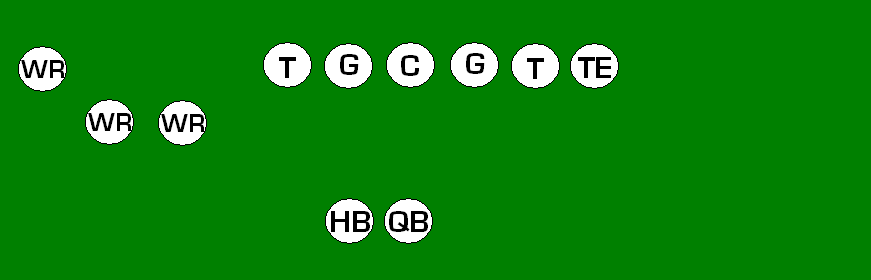
Shotgun, Trips left (3 wide receivers on the same side)

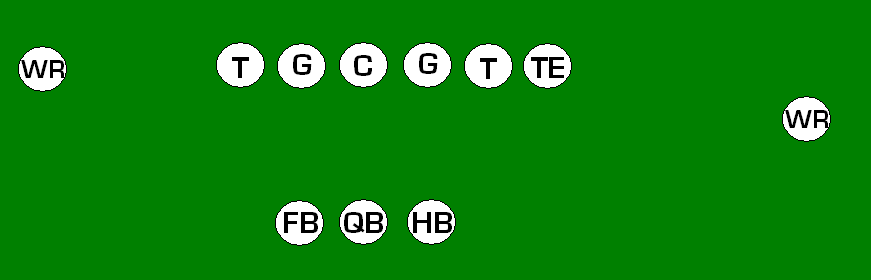
Shotgun, Max Protect (Full back in to provide additional protection to quarterback)

=== Pistol ===
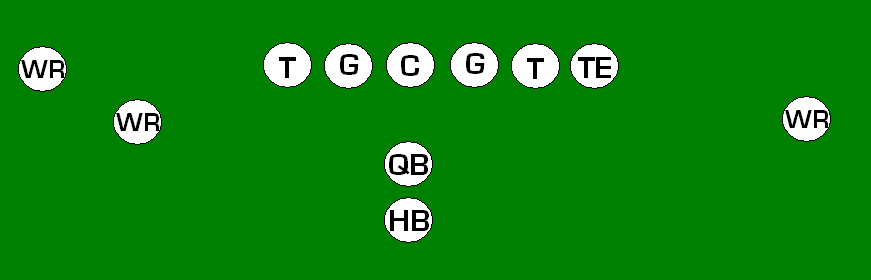
Chris Ault's "Pistol" formation

This offense was originated with Chris Ault at the University of Nevada, Reno, known for sports purposes as Nevada. It is essentially a shotgun variation, with the quarterback lined up closer than in standard shotgun (normally 3 to 4 yards behind center), and a running back lined up behind, rather than next to, the QB (normally at 3 to 4 yards behind quarterback).

The pistol formation adds the dimension of a running game with the halfback being in a singleback position. This has disrupted the timing of some defenses with the way the quarterback hands the ball off to the halfback. This also allows the smaller halfbacks to hide behind the offensive line, causing opposing linebackers and pass-rushing defensive linemen to play more conservatively. The Pistol can also feature the option play. With this offense, the quarterback has the ability to get a better look past the offensive line and at the defense. Pistol formations have gained some popularity in NCAA football, and in fact, variants of this offense were used by the 2007 and 2009 BCS National Champions, LSU and Alabama, respectively.

In 2008, Kansas City Chiefs offensive coordinator Chan Gailey began using the Pistol prominently in their offense, and are the first NFL team to do so. He brought the philosophy with him to the Buffalo Bills in 2010. The San Francisco 49ers added the Pistol to their offense in 2012 after former Nevada quarterback Colin Kaepernick became the team's starter. By the late 2010s, the pistol had become a favored formation of teams running the run-pass option (RPO) offense, such as the 2019 Baltimore Ravens with quarterback Lamar Jackson.

=== Swinging gate ===
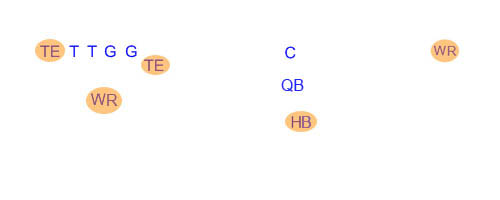
Swinging Gate

An unusual formation, the swinging gate consists of a center all alone with the quarterback lined up behind him in shotgun. The rest of the offense is far away near the sideline. Both guards, both tackles, a tight end, and a receiver line up on the line of scrimmage. The running back(s) and other receivers line up in the backfield close to the lineman. One unique factor about this formation, depending on the exact alignment, is that the center can be an eligible receiver if he is the farthest outside on the line of scrimmage. The quarterback can receive the snap and choose to throw a forward pass to the center or turn and throw a pass or lateral to a back opposite the field from him and the center.

This formation is typically used for trick plays, though it is somewhat counterintuitively effective in short-yardage situations: a screen pass thrown to the strong side of the formation will have enough blockers to generate a push forward, and the mismatch can create enough of an advantage that the center and quarterback can provide enough blocking power to clear a path for the running back. The most recent use of this formation was in 2024, when the New York Giants played the Pittsburgh Steelers in the fourth quarter during a two-point conversion when Daniel Jones took the snap and flicked the ball to Malik Nabers but the play was predicted by Alex Highsmith whom tackled Nabers immediately.

=== V formation ===
Os Doenges of Oklahoma City University is credited with inventing the offensive V formation, nicknamed "Three dots and a dash" (Morse code for the letter "v"). His Oklahoma City program presented the new offensive formation to great fanfare before losing to the Southwestern Moundbuilders by a score of 7–0.

=== Wishbone ===
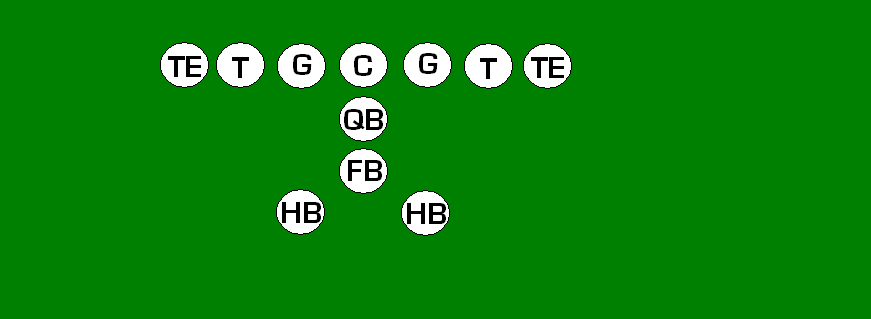
The Wishbone formation

The wishbone is a 1960s variation of the T-formation. It consists of three running backs: a fullback lined up directly behind the quarterback, and the two halfbacks split behind the fullback. It can be run with two tight ends, one tight end and one wide receiver, or two wide receivers. Most offensive systems that employ the wishbone use it as their primary formation, and most run the ball much more often than they pass. The wishbone is a common formation for the triple option offense in which the quarterback decides after the snap whether to hand the ball to the fullback for a run up the middle, pitch the ball to a running back on the outside, or keep the ball and run it himself.

The wishbone was developed in the 1960s by Emory Bellard, offensive coordinator at the University of Texas under head coach Darrell Royal. The offense was an immediate success, and Texas won the national championship in 1969 running a wishbone / option system. It was subsequently adopted by many other college programs in the 1970s, including Alabama and Oklahoma, who also won national titles with variations of the offense. However, as with any hugely successful formation or philosophy, as teams learned how to defend against it, it became much less successful.

Today, the wishbone / option offense is still used by some high school and smaller college teams, but it is much less common in major college football, where teams tend to employ more pass-oriented attacks. The United States Air Force Academy (aka Air Force), the United States Naval Academy (Navy) and Georgia Tech were among the few NCAA FBS teams that commonly used the wishbone and its variations into the 2010s; Air Force still uses the wishbone, while Navy has adopted a variant of the wing-T and Georgia Tech now uses a pro-style spread offense.

The wishbone has very rarely been used in professional football, as it was developed after passing quarterbacks became the norm. NFL quarterbacks are not necessarily good runners, and are in any case too valuable to the offense to risk injury by regularly running with the football. During the strike season of 1987, the San Francisco 49ers used the wishbone successfully against the New York Giants to win 41–21. Coach Bill Walsh used the wishbone because of his replacement quarterback's familiarity with a similar formation in college.

=== Flexbone ===
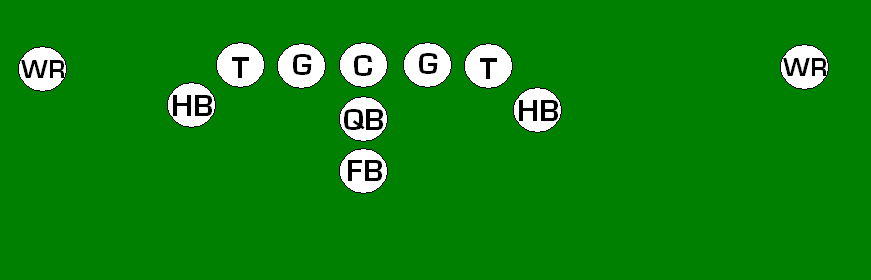
The base flexbone formation.

The flexbone formation is a variation of the wishbone formation. In this formation, one back (the fullback) lines up behind the quarterback. Both ends are often split wide as wide receivers, though some variations include one or two tight ends. The two remaining backs, called wingbacks or slotbacks, line up behind the line of scrimmage just outside the tackles. Usually, one of the wingbacks will go in motion behind the quarterback before the snap, potentially giving him another option to pitch to.

Like the wishbone, the flexbone formation is commonly used to run the triple option. However, the flexbone is considered more "flex"-ible than the wishbone because, since the wingbacks line up on the line of scrimmage, more run / pass options and variations are possible.

=== Wing T ===
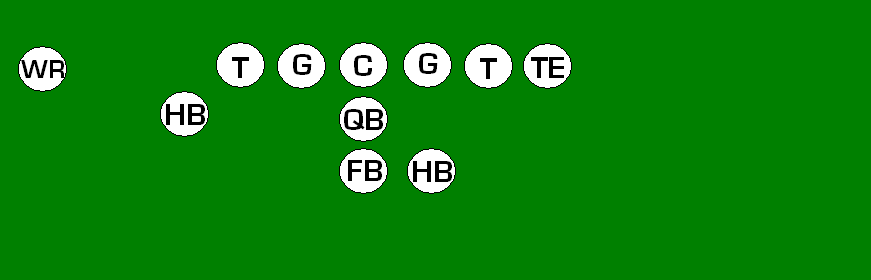
The Delaware Wing T, as developed by David Nelson. In this case, one of the half backs starts in the back field. The other (the wing back) almost always goes in motion towards the QB at the snap

A formation similar to the Flexbone, though much older, is known as the "Delaware Wing-T" was created by longtime University of Delaware coach and NCAA Rules Committee chairman David M. Nelson, and perfected by his successor Tubby Raymond. It has become a very popular offense with high schools and small colleges. It was designed at the time to be a mix between the single wing and T-formation. It took the motion and run-strength of the single wing, and the QB-under-center from the T. In this variation, there is only one wing back, with the other back lined up next to the fullback on the opposite side from the wing back. However, the Wing Back may also line up diagonally from the Tight End. He may be used as an extra blocker or a receiver. He may come in motion for running plays.

The Wing T has its roots in what Otto D. Unruh called the "T-Wing" formation and is known to have called the play as early as 1938 with the Bethel Threshers.

=== Empty backfield ===
Empty backfield, trips split left, slot right

Also known simply as "Five-wide", a reference to the five wide receivers. In the empty backfield formation, all of the backs play near the line of scrimmage to act as extra wide receivers or tight ends, with the quarterback lining up either under center or, most commonly, in the shotgun. This is almost exclusively a passing formation used to spread the field, often to open up short inside routes or screen routes. The most common running play from this formation is a quarterback draw play up the middle since defensive players are spread out from sideline to sideline. It can also be used similarly to a flexbone formation, with the receivers closest to the center acting as wing backs in an option play. This formation is most often used on obvious passing downs in the NFL and college football though some teams use it more often, such as Texas Tech University and the New England Patriots in their record-setting 2007 season.

=== Goal line formation ===
Also called "jumbo", "heavy", "full house" and other similar names, this formation is used exclusively in short-yardage situations, and especially near the goal line. This formation typically has no wide receivers, and often employs 3 tight ends and 2 running backs, or alternately 2 tight ends and 3 running backs. Often, a tight end or full back position is occupied by a player who normally plays offensive line or defensive line positions to act as an extra blocker. The Chicago Bears of the mid-1980s famously used defensive tackle William "The Refrigerator" Perry as a fullback in this formation. In most cases, it is exclusively a running formation, designed to score by brute force. Some teams have successfully used this formation for pass plays, most famously the New England Patriots, who used linebacker Mike Vrabel as a tight end to catch touchdown passes in both Super Bowl XXXVIII and Super Bowl XXXIX, two of ten completions – all for touchdowns – in fourteen such targets.

=== Victory ===
The "victory" formation was developed in 1978 after The Miracle at the Meadowlands.

A special offensive formation is used at the end of a game, when a team has a lead and simply needs to run out the clock to win the game. The "kneel" or "victory" formation was developed in the 1978 NFL season after The Miracle at the Meadowlands, a botched final play in a game between the New York Giants and the Philadelphia Eagles that resulted in a fumble and a pivotal last-second score. This formation is intended for one purpose: to allow the quarterback to safely down the ball without losing control, preventing the defense from recovering and advancing the ball to the end zone. The formation features several stop-gaps in the event the quarterback does lose the ball: a seven-man line, the quarterback, two upbacks (running backs) immediately behind him, one at each side in the event he fumbles, and a fast player (usually a wide receiver or cornerback) several yards back as a last resort in case the defense recovers and is able to advance the ball.

Both the Giants and Eagles developed similar formations of this design. The Eagles named their version the "Herman Edwards" play after their cornerback who scored the winning touchdown on the above fateful play.

=== Tackle spread ===
A modern implementation of the Emory and Henry formation

The tackle spread or "Emory and Henry" formation is an unusual American football formation that dates to the early 1950s, when the Wasps of Emory & Henry College under head coach Conley Snidow used it as part of their base offense. Instead of the conventional grouping of all five ineligible offensive linemen in the middle of the formation, the Emory and Henry spreads the tackles out to the edge of the field along with two receivers or slotbacks, creating two groupings of three players near each sideline. Meanwhile, the center and the guards remain in the middle of the field along with the quarterback and a running back.

The formation's main usage in recent years has been as an unexpected wrinkle that attempts to confuse the defense into lining up incorrectly or blowing assignments in pass coverage. It is used exclusively as a change of pace due to its inherent limitations, namely that the tackles cannot receive forward passes or advance downfield despite their positioning, and that the diminished interior line makes the quarterback vulnerable to a quickly-arriving pass rush. The most common play out of the formation is a quick pass to a receiver on the outside which functions much like a wide receiver screen or, if defenders crowd the line of scrimmage, a quickly thrown streak route with the receiver attempting to run past them. If the defense shifts too many defenders out near the sidelines, the offense might attempt to run up the middle behind the three-man offensive line. The formation has also been used as a basis for trick plays such as a backwards pass to a player near the sideline followed by forward pass down the field.

The Emory & Henry formation was revived in the 1990s by Florida and South Carolina coach Steve Spurrier, who coined its commonly used name when he explained that he'd seen Emory and Henry College run it in the 1950s. The New England Patriots used a variation of the formation by placing a (legally declared) eligible-numbered receiver in the ineligible tackle position; the confusion this caused prompted the league to impose a rule change prohibiting that twist beginning in 2015.

A tackle-spread formation was included in the video game Madden NFL 18 under the name "Gun Monster;" it proved to be a problem for the game's artificial intelligence, which could not discern eligible receivers from ineligible ones.

The Cincinnati Bengals under Marvin Lewis occasionally used a variant of the Emory and Henry formation, which they called the "Star Wars" formation; in their version, both offensive tackles line up on the same side of the quarterback, thus creating a hybrid between the Emory & Henry and the swinging gate.

The A-11 offense combines the Emory and Henry with the wildcat, in that either of the two backs in the backfield can receive the snap and act as quarterback. In its earliest incarnation, it also used a loophole in the high school rulebook that allowed players wearing any uniform number to play at either an ineligible or eligible position, further increasing defensive confusion and allowing for more flexibility among players changing positions between plays. However, this facet of the offense was never legal at the college or professional level, and the high school loophole was closed in 2009.

=== CFL Screen ===
The "CFL Screen" formation involves placing a running back 15 yards behind the line of scrimmage, and usually outside the offensive tackles. It is typically used for a particular type of screen pass in which this running back begins sprinting forward at the snap, gaining momentum in the process, as the quarterback pitches the ball to said running back in stride such that the running back reaches the line of scrimmage at full speed, instead of from a near-standstill; the distance between the running back and the line of scrimmage largely protects the play from being disrupted by a defensive player.

The formation is named after the Canadian Football League, where offensive players are allowed unlimited forward motion before the snap and regularly begin sprinting toward the line of scrimmage before the play begins. Similar plays are also seen in arena football, which also allows forward motion, and the use of the CFL Screen in the traditional outdoor game has also drawn comparison to the arena game. American football does not allow forward motion before the snap, thus necessitating the long distance behind the line of scrimmage to achieve the same degree of momentum.

== Defensive formations ==
There are no rules regarding the formation of defensive players or their movement before the opportunity to take a set position. Therefore, the deployment and tactics of defensive players are bound only by the imagination of the play designer and the line of scrimmage. Below are some of the most popular defensive formations through the history of football.

=== 4–3 defense ===
Basic 4–3

This base defense consists of four defensive linemen, three linebackers, and four defensive backs (two safeties, two corners). Against two-receiver offensive sets, this formation is effective against the run and the pass. In the original 4–3, defensive tackles would line up opposite the offensive guards, and defensive ends on the outside shoulders of the offensive tackles. On passing downs, the Mike (middle linebacker) is often responsible to cover any running backs, the Sam (strong-side linebacker) covers the Tight End, and the Will (weak-side linebacker) either covers a back or blitzes in an attempt to sack the quarterback. Though first used as a base defense by the New York Giants in 1956, plenty of teams experimented with it during the 1950s, and thus there are multiple claimed inventors of this defense. There are several different variations of the 4–3 defense such as the 4-3 under defense, 4-3 over defense, 4-3 umbrella defense, 4-3 swim defense, and 4-3 slide defense.

4-3 under defense (linebackers shifted to strong-side)

4-3 over defense (linebackers shifted to weak-side)

=== 6–1 defense ===
To counter Brown's attack, Owen installed a 6–1–4 defense, with his ends, Jim Duncan and Ray Poole, "flexing," or dropping back as linebackers. It was the forerunner of the modern 4–3

— Paul Zimmerman, Zimmerman, Paul, The Past is Prelude, (September 1, 1997), Sports Illustrated, Retrieved June 22, 2013.

The original 6-1 was invented by Steve Owen in 1950 as a counter to the powerful passing attack of Paul Brown's Cleveland Browns. It was called the "Umbrella" defense because of the four defensive backs, whose crescent alignment resembled an opened umbrella, and the tactic of allowing the defensive ends to fall back into pass coverage, converting the defense, in Owen's language, from a 6–1–4 into a 4–1–6. If offenses grew wise to the drop back, the ends could pass rush instead. Using this new defense, the Giants defeated the Browns twice in 1950 during the regular season.

Paul Brown was such a meticulous coach that if you gave him something he'd never seen before, he became flustered.

— Tom Landry, Zimmerman, Paul, The New Thinking Man's Guide to Pro Football, Simon and Schuster, 1984, p. 128

It saw use during the 1950s in Owen's hands, but never became a significant base defense. It was functionally replaced by the more versatile 4–3. Most recently the 6-1 Defense saw an appearance in Super Bowl LIII, where the New England Patriots used it to pressure the high-powering Los Angeles Rams.

=== 3–4 defense ===
Basic 3–4

This is the base defense of some teams. It consists of three defensive linemen, four linebackers, and four defensive backs (two safeties, two corners). The advantage is that while 4 players still usually rush the line, the quarterback can be less sure of which of the 4 linebackers will join the 3 linemen. This formation sacrifices some size (of linemen) for speed (of linebackers), but coaches choosing to utilize this formation as their base defense typically choose larger players in the front 7 to make up for the shortage of size. In this formation, the single tackle usually lines up directly over the "nose" of the ball, and is often called the "nose guard" or "nose tackle". The "Nose Tackle" is still a DT (Defensive Tackle) with a different name. In this formation, the linemen often line up directly in front of the offensive line, while the linebackers "shoot the gaps". There is also a variation of this defense called the 3-4 under defense. This defense is a one gap version of the 3–4 defense.

=== 2–5 defense ===
The 2-5 defense consists of two defensive linemen, five linebackers, and four defensive backs (two safety, two corners). In this variation of the 3–4, known also as the "3–4 eagle", the nose guard is removed from play and in his place is an extra linebacker, who lines up on the line where the nose guard would be, sometimes slightly behind where the nose guard would be. It allows defenses more flexibility in man to man coverages and zone blitzes. It was created by Los Angeles Rams defensive coordinator Fritz Shurmur, and evolved from Buddy Ryan's 46 defense. Shurmur created the defense in part to take advantage of the pass rush abilities of Kevin Greene, a defensive end sized linebacker. The "eagle" in the formation's name comes from the late 1940s-early 1950s Philadelphia Eagles coached by Greasy Neale.

The original Eagle defense was a 5–2 arrangement, with five defensive linemen and two linebackers. In Neale's defense, as in Shurmur's variation, the nose tackle could also drop into pass coverage, thus Shurmur's use of the Eagle defense name.

=== 4–4 defense ===
The 4–4 defense consists of four defensive linemen, four linebackers, and three defensive backs (one safety, two corners). It puts "eight men in the box" to stop the run, but it sacrifices deep coverage against the pass, especially if the opponent's receivers are better athletes than the cornerbacks. The formation is popular in high school football as well as smaller collegiate teams. If the opposite team is a good passing team, outside linebackers are usually called on to defend slotbacks.

=== 5-3 defense ===
Defense is based on two standard formations, the 6-2-3, and the 5-3-3. All else is "variations."

— Steve Owen, Owen (1952), p. 174

The 5-3 defense consists of five defensive linemen, three linebackers, and three defensive backs (one safety, two corners). It appeared in the early thirties as a response to the improving passing offenses of the time, particularly the T formation. It grew in importance as the 1940s progressed, as it was more effective versus the T than the other standard defense of the time, the 6–2. By 1950, five man lines were standard in the NFL, either the 5-3 or the 5-2 Eagle. As late as the early 1950s, the Cleveland Browns were using a 5–3 as their base defense.

=== 6-2 defense ===
The 6-2 defense consists of six defensive linemen, two linebackers, and three defensive backs (one safety, two corners). This was the primary defense in football, at all levels, during the single wing era (the 1930s), combining enough passing defense to handle the passing attacks of the day along with the ability to handle the power running games of the times. As the T formation grew popular in the 1940s, this formation was replaced in the NFL with the 5-3 and the 5-2 defenses. This defensive formation is still used as a "goal line" formation with some NFL teams.

In colleges, this defensive front has remained viable for a much longer period of time, because colleges, historically, have run a lot more than the NFL. Three common six man fronts seen in this more modern era are the tight six (linebackers over offensive ends, four linemen between linebackers), the wide tackle 6 (linebackers over offensive tackles, two linemen between linebackers) and the split 6 (linebackers over guard-center gap, all linemen outside linebackers).

=== 38 defense (split middle) ===
38 refers to the positions of the defensive players on the line of scrimmage. Two "3" techniques (DT, lined up outside of the guards) and two "8" techniques (DE, lined up outside of end man on line of scrimmage). The DT's are the only down lineman. Two standup players (Monster and Rover) are in "5" techniques. Two Linebackers are 3 yards off the ball behind the DT's. A combination of the 4–4, 6–2, and the 46, it is designed to stop the run and to confuse offenses. 3 players in the secondary all cover deep thirds. The confusing element is either the "5" techniques or the "8" techniques can rush or drop into the flats. The LB's have hook zones. Each player on the line has a two gap responsibility.

=== 46 defense (forty-six) ===
The 46. Notice the strong safety in the box and the two outside linebackers shifted to the same side outside of the defensive end

This formation was invented by Buddy Ryan, defensive coordinator of the Chicago Bears during the 1980s. Instead of having four linemen and six linebackers (as the name may suggest), it is actually a 4–4 set using 4–3 personnel. This was accomplished by moving a safety up into the "box" instead of a fourth linebacker. The '46' refers not to any lineman/linebacker orientation but was the jersey number of hard hitting strong safety Doug Plank, the player Buddy Ryan first used in this role at Chicago. The other feature of the 46 was the placement of both "outside" linebackers on the same side of the formation, with the defensive line shifted the opposite way with the weak defensive end about 1 to 2 yards outside the weak offensive tackle. This defense was the philosophical equivalent of the "Notre Dame Box" offense devised by Knute Rockne in the 1930s, in that it used an unbalanced field and complex pre-snap motion to confuse the opposing offense. Chicago rode this defense (which was amplified by Ryan's overpowering blitz packages) into a 15–1 season in 1985, culminating in a 46–10 win over New England in Super Bowl XX.

=== 5–2 defense ===
The 5–2. If the defensive ends drop into pass coverage, this formation becomes functionally equivalent to a 4-3

The 5–2 defense consists of five defensive linemen, two linebackers, and four defensive backs (two corners, two safeties). Historically, this was the first major defense with 4 defensive backs, and was used to combat the passing attacks of the time. A later evolution of the original 5-2 is the Oklahoma 5–2, which ultimately became the professional 3-4 when the defensive ends of the original 5-2 were substituted over time for the outside linebackers of the 3–4. The differences between the Oklahoma 5-2 and the 3-4 are largely semantics.

=== Seven-man line defense ===
Seven-man line defenses use seven down linemen on the line of scrimmage. The most common seven-man line defenses were the 7–2–2 defense and the 7–1–2–1 defense. They were most common before the forward pass became prevalent, but were still common prior to the inception of the platoon system. They are still sometimes used in goal-line situations.

=== Nickel formation ===
While the original Nickel defense utilized 5 defensive backs in conjunction with a 4-man rush, and 2 linebackers, modern definition calls any formation that utilizes 5 defensive backs (from nickel = 5 cent piece) a Nickel defense. The Nickel defense originated as an innovation of Philadelphia Eagles defensive coach Jerry Williams in 1960 as a measure to defend star tight end Mike Ditka of the Chicago Bears. The Nickel coverage scheme is often used when the offense is using an additional wide receiver as it matches an extra cornerback against the extra receiver. The extra corner is often called a nickelback. Some variations use an extra strong safety instead of an extra cornerback. Strong safeties are often the more physical of the safeties, often resembling linebackers, so a Nickel with the extra safety can be more effective against the run than one with an extra corner. The Nickel formation comes in several varieties:

4–2–5 nickel defense

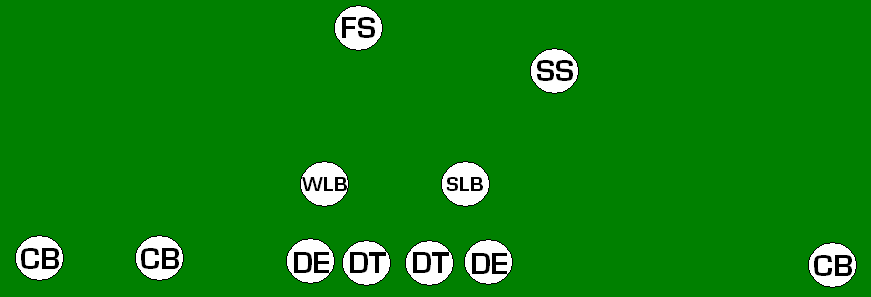
4–2–5

There are a couple paths to the 4–2–5. One is by removing a linebacker from the standard 4–3 to add the extra defensive back. The second is by converting the ends of a wide tackle six to safeties (the defensive ends of a wide tackle six already have pass defense responsibilities). A variation is the 2–4–5, which is primarily run by teams that run the 3–4 defense. They replace a defensive tackle with a corner.

3–3–5 nickel defense

3–3–5

The 3–3–5 removes a lineman to the nickelback.

33 stack

33 stack green

The 33 stack uses an extra strong safety, and "stacks" linebackers and safeties directly behind the defensive linemen.

3–5–3

3–5–3

The 3–5–3 refers to a defense that has three down linemen (the "3" level), three linebackers and two corners (the "5" level), one free safety and 2 strong safeties (the "3" level). This is similar to a 33 stack, but with players more spread. Also called the "umbrella" defense or "3-deep". In this set, the third safety would be referred to as a "weak safety" (WS) and allows two position safeties at the mid-level with a third safety deep. It is because of this that the secondary safety in a football defense is called a free safety rather than a weak safety

=== Dime formation ===
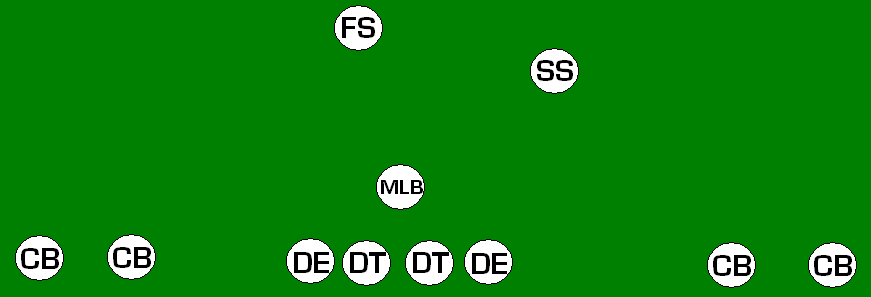
A 4–1–6 (typical dime set-up)

Any defense consisting of six defensive backs. The sixth defensive back is known as the dimeback and this defense is also used in passing situations (particularly when the offense is using four wide receivers). As the extra defensive back in the nickel formation is called the nickel, two nickels gives you a dime, hence the name of the formation.

=== Prevent defense ===
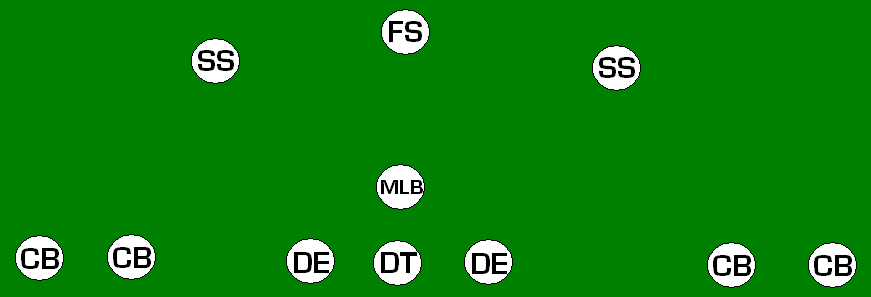
3-deep quarter formation (3–1–7), the most common

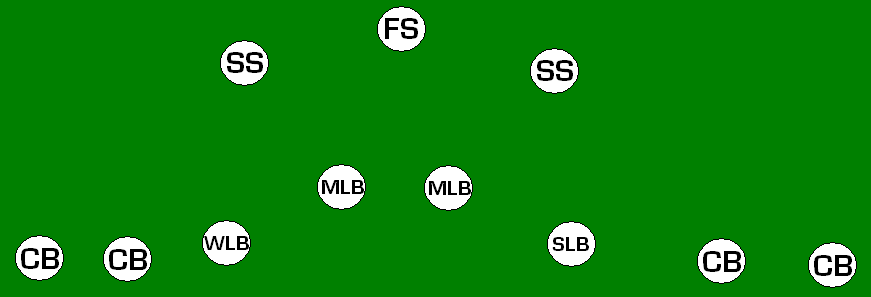
The 0–4–7 quarter

Defense consisting of seven (quarter) or eight (half dollar) defensive backs. The seventh defensive back is often an extra safety, and this defense is used in extreme passing situations (such as to defend against a Hail Mary pass). It is occasionally referred to as the prevent defense because of its use in preventing desperation plays. The cornerbacks and safeties in a prevent defense usually make a point of defending the goal line at the expense of receivers in the middle of the field.

The quarter formations are run from a 3–1–7 or a 4–0–7 in most instances; the New England Patriots have used an 0–4–7 in some instances with no down linemen. Half dollar defenses are almost always run from a 3–0–8 formation. The eighth defensive back in this case is usually a wide receiver from the offense. The wide receiver can capitalize on interception opportunities in the expected high-risk offensive play.

Unlike other formations, the extra safety is not referred to as a quarterback or halfback (except in Canadian football), to avoid confusion with the offensive positions of the same names, but rather simply as a defensive back or a safety.

Formations with many defensive backs positioned far from the line of scrimmage are susceptible to running plays and short passes. However, since the defense is typically used only in the last few seconds of a game when the defensive team need only keep the offense from scoring a touchdown, giving up a few yards in the middle of the field is inconsequential.

=== Other variants ===
More extreme defensive formations have been used when a coach feels that his team is at a particular disadvantage due to the opponent's offensive tactics or poor personnel match-ups.

For example, in 2007, New York Jets head coach Eric Mangini employed a scheme against Tom Brady and the New England Patriots that utilized only 1 defensive lineman and 6 linebackers. Prior to the snap, only the lone lineman assumed a three-point stance near the offensive center while the 6 linebackers "roved" up and down the line of scrimmage, attempting to confuse the quarterback as to whether they would rush the passer, drop into coverage, or play the run. This defense (combined with poor weather conditions) did slow the Patriot's passing game, but proved ineffective against the run, and the Patriots won the game.

== Special teams formations ==
=== Punting formation ===
Diagram of a punt formation (blue, at top), against a punt-block formation (red, at bottom).

Punting formations use a five-man offensive line, three "upbacks" (sometimes also referred to as "personal protectors") approximately 3 yards behind the line to act as an additional line of defense, two wide receivers known as "gunners" either to stop the punt returner or to down the ball, and the punter, 15 yards behind the line of scrimmage to receive the long snap. (If the punting team is deep in its own territory, the 15-yard distance would have to be shortened by up to 5 yards to keep the punter in front of the end line.) The number of upbacks and gunners can vary, and either position can be replaced by a tight end in a "max protect" situation.

=== Field goal formation ===
Most field goals feature nine offensive linemen (seven on the line, both ends in the tight end position, with two extra slightly off the line of scrimmage), a place holder who kneels 7 or 8 yards behind the line of scrimmage, and a kicker.

=== Kickoff formation ===
Kickoff formations are usually in a straight line, with ten players (nine if a placeholder is used on the kickoff) lined up across the field several yards behind the ball. Many leagues require that at least four players be on each side of the kicker at the time of a kick; prior to this, an onside kick formation often had all ten of the other players on one side of the kicker. In 2011, the NFL instituted a rule requiring players other than the kicker to line up no more than 5 yards from the ball before the kick. The latter rule was instituted to prevent players from generating the speed expected from a 15-yard runup before the kick, thus potentially reducing the speed and impact of collisions down the field.

In 2018, the NFL further amended the rules on the kickoff formation. All players other than the kicker may now line up no more than 1 yard behind the restraining line. The rule also states that there must be five players on both sides of the ball. On each side, two players must line up outside the numbers and two players must be lined up between the numbers and the hashmarks. The NFL also made a rule regarding the receiving team's formation in 2018. Eight players on the receiving team must be lined up in the 15-yard "set up zone" measured from the receiving team's restraining line 10 yards from the ball.

=== Kick return formation ===
Kick return formations vary; in most amateur situations, an association football-like formation is used, with eleven players staggered throughout the field including two (rarely, one) kick returners back to field deep kicks, two more twenty yards ahead of them to field squib kicks, two more at about midfield mainly to assist in blocking, and five players located the minimum ten yards from the kicking line. In obvious onside kick formations, more players are moved to the front of the formation, usually top wide receivers and other players who are good at recovering and catching loose balls; this formation is known as the "hands team". A kick returner will usually remain back in the event of an unexpected deep kick in this situation.

In professional football, beginning with The Spring League in 2019, followed by the XFL in 2020 and then adopted by the NFL in 2024, kick return formations must mirror the kicking team's; nine players must line up along the 35-yard line, with two return specialists allowed in the team's own red zone to receive the kick, which the opposing kicker must kick into or else incur a penalty.

To defend punts, the defensive line usually uses a man-on-man system with seven defensive linemen, two cornerbacks, a linebacker and a kick returner. They may choose to attempt to block the punt, or drop back to block for the receiver.
