= Eligible receiver =

American football rules where only certain players can catch a pass

In gridiron football, not all players on offense are entitled to receive a forward pass: only an eligible pass receiver may legally catch a forward pass, and only an eligible receiver may advance beyond the neutral zone if a forward pass crosses into the neutral zone. If the pass is received by a non-eligible receiver, it is "illegal touching" (resulting in a penalty of five yards and loss of down). If an ineligible receiver is beyond the neutral zone when a forward pass crossing the neutral zone is thrown, a foul of "ineligible receiver downfield" (resulting in a penalty of five yards, but no loss of down) is called. Each league has slightly different rules regarding who is considered an eligible receiver.

== College football ==
The NCAA rulebook defines eligible receivers for college football in Rule 7, Section 3, Article 3. The determining factors are the player's position on the field at the snap and their jersey number. Specifically, any players on offense wearing numbers between 50 and 79 are always ineligible. All defensive players are eligible receivers and offensive players who are not wearing an ineligible number are eligible receivers if they meet one of the following three criteria:

- Player is at either end of the group of players on the line of scrimmage (wide receivers and tight ends)
- Player is lined up at least one yard behind the line of scrimmage (running backs, fullbacks, slot receivers, etc.)
- Player is positioned to receive a hand-to-hand snap from the center (almost always the quarterback)

Players may only wear eligible numbers at an ineligible position when it is obvious that a punt or field goal is to be attempted.

If a player is to change between eligible and ineligible positions, they must physically change jersey numbers to reflect the position.

A receiver loses his eligibility by leaving the field of play unless he was forced out by a defensive player and immediately attempts to get back inbounds (Rule 7–3–4). All players on the field become eligible as soon as the ball is touched by a defensive player or an official during play (Rule 7–3–5).

== Professional football ==
In both American and Canadian professional football, every player on the defensive team is considered eligible. The offensive team must have at least seven players lined up on the line of scrimmage. Of the players on the line of scrimmage, only the two players on the ends of the line of scrimmage are eligible receivers. The remaining players are in the backfield (four in American football, five in Canadian football), including the quarterback. These backfield players are also eligible receivers. In the National Football League (NFL), a quarterback who takes his stance behind center as a T-formation quarterback is not eligible unless, before the ball is snapped, he legally moves to a position at least one yard behind the line of scrimmage or on the end of the line, and is stationary in that position for at least one second before the snap, but is nonetheless not counted toward the seven men required on the line of scrimmage.

If, for example, eight men line up on the line of scrimmage, the team loses an eligible receiver. This can often happen when a flanker or slot receiver, who is supposed to line up behind the line of scrimmage, instead lines up on the line of scrimmage between the offensive line and a split end. In most cases where a pass is caught by an ineligible receiver, it is usually because the quarterback was under pressure and threw it to an offensive lineman out of desperation.

Eligible receivers must wear certain uniform numbers, so that the officials can more easily distinguish between eligible and ineligible receivers. In the NFL, running backs, wide receivers, and tight ends must wear numbers 0 to 49 and 80 to 89. Numbers 50 to 79 are reserved for linemen and are always ineligible on offense unless they report as eligible. In the CFL ineligible receivers must wear numbers 50 to 69; all other numbers (including 0 and 00) may be worn by eligible receivers. A player who is not wearing a number that corresponds to an eligible receiver is ineligible even if he lines up in an eligible position. However, a player who reports to the referee that he intends to be eligible in the following play is allowed to line up and act as an eligible receiver. An example of this was a 1985 NFL game in which William Perry, wearing number 72 and normally a defensive lineman, was made an eligible receiver on an offensive play, and successfully caught a touchdown pass attempt. A more recent example has been former New England Patriots linebacker Mike Vrabel lining up as a tight end in goal line situations. In the 2018 season, George Fant had also lined up in the tight end position for the Seattle Seahawks due to injuries to the starting tight ends Ed Dickson and Will Dissly. In the 2019 season, the Atlanta Falcons declared right tackle Ty Sambrailo eligible on many plays before throwing the ball to him for a 35-yard touchdown against the Tampa Bay Buccaneers.

Before the snap of the ball, in the American game, backfield players may only move parallel to the line of scrimmage, only one back may be in motion at any given time, and if forward motion has occurred, the back must be still for a full second before the snap. The receiver may be in motion laterally or away from the line of scrimmage at the snap. A breach of this rule results in a penalty for illegal procedure (five yards). However, in the Canadian game, eligible receivers may move in any direction before the snap, any number may be in motion at any one time, and there is no need to be motionless before the snap.

The rules on eligible receivers only apply to forward passes. Any player may legally catch a backwards or lateral pass.

In the American game, once the play has started, eligible receivers can become ineligible depending on how the play develops. Any eligible receiver that goes out of bounds is no longer an eligible receiver and cannot receive a forward pass, unless that player re-establishes by taking three steps in bounds. Also, if a pass is touched by any defensive player or eligible offensive receiver (tipped by a defensive lineman, slips through a receiver's hands, etc.), every offensive player immediately becomes eligible. In the CFL all players become eligible receivers if a pass is touched by a member of the defensive team. A proposed rule change in the XFL would make all players behind the line of scrimmage eligible receivers, regardless of position or number.

== High school ==
In high school football, the rules of eligibility are roughly the same as in the college game. However, as of February 2009, at least five players must wear numbers between 50 and 79 on first, second, or third down, which by rule would make them ineligible receivers. This was because of a change in the definition of a scrimmage-kick formation made by the National Federation of State High School Associations (NFHS). The change was intended to close a loophole in the rules which allowed teams to run an A-11 offense, in which a team would be exempted from eligibility numbering restrictions if the player receiving the snap was at least seven yards behind the line of scrimmage.

In 2019, the NFHS changed the rules slightly, instead measuring the number of players behind the line of scrimmage, limiting that number to four. The minimum number of players on the offensive line was reduced from seven to five.

== See also ==
- Glossary of American football
