= Tackle-eligible play =

Play in gridiron football

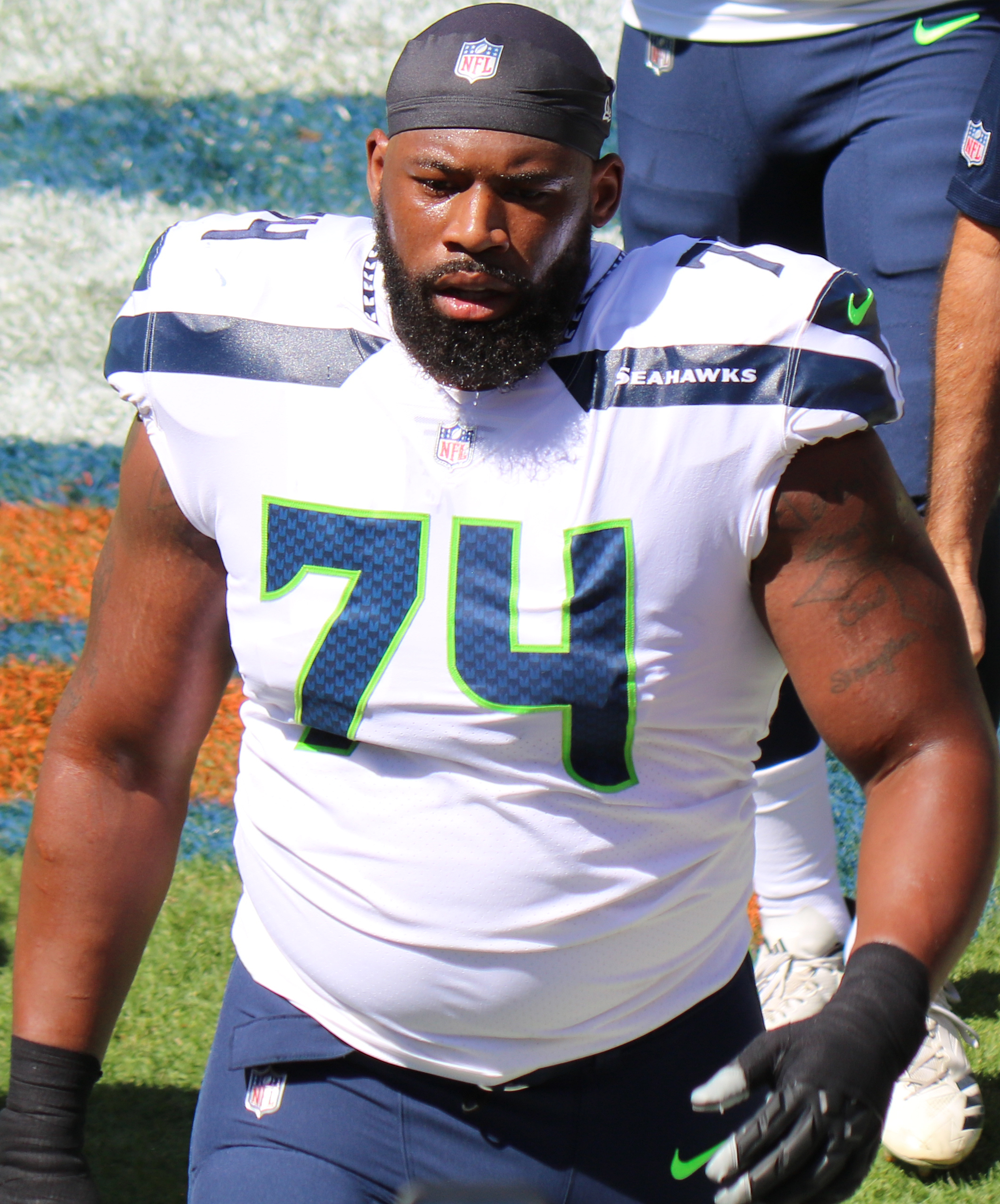
George Fant wore number 74, making him an ineligible receiver unless he declares himself eligible to the referee before a play.

In American football, the tackle-eligible play is a forward-pass play in which coaches will attempt to create mismatches against a defense by inserting an offensive tackle (who is not normally allowed more than five yards down field on a forward-pass play), into an offensive formation as an eligible receiver, usually as a tight end or as a fullback. This is done by changing the formation of the offensive line, via positioning two linemen (including the "catching tackle") on one side of the center and three linemen on the other.

Under almost all versions of football, offensive linemen cannot receive or touch forward passes, nor can they advance downfield in passing situations. To identify which receivers are eligible and which are not, football rules stipulate that ineligible receivers must wear a number between 50 and 79. However, in some leagues, normally ineligible receivers may align as an eligible receiver provided they inform the referee of such a change. Typically, a player must leave the field for a single play before returning to their original position.

== NFL ==
The official NFL rules stipulate that an offensive player wearing uniform number 50 through 79 (the range of numbers that offensive linemen may wear in that league) may not line up as an eligible receiver, with a violation being penalized as an illegal substitution. However, the rules provide an exception where such a player may become eligible if he declares his intent to the referee prior to the play. The referee then announces that the ineligible number "x" is reporting as an eligible receiver. This announcement is made using the referee's microphone so that spectators and the opposing team can hear. The eligibility is in effect for only one play; the report to the referee must be repeated before every play in which the offense plans to make the player eligible. Similarly, a player whose number is typically "eligible" must report himself ineligible to the referee, otherwise his team would be penalized for illegal formation. An example is when New England Patriots running back Shane Vereen did this in the 2014–15 NFL playoffs versus the Baltimore Ravens.

The tackle-eligible play typically goes unnoticed, but for one prominent exception: when the player reporting as an eligible receiver catches a forward pass (usually for a short touchdown).

The name most commonly associated with the tackle-eligible play is Mike Vrabel, a linebacker wearing jersey number 50, who recorded 10 receptions for 10 touchdowns in his career—including one each in Super Bowl XXXVIII and Super Bowl XXXIX—as a member of the New England Patriots and Kansas City Chiefs.

Cincinnati Bengals' Pro Football Hall of Fame offensive tackle Anthony Muñoz caught seven passes for 18 yards and four touchdowns in his 13-year career. Buffalo Bills' offensive tackle Mitch Frerotte made a name for himself in 1992 by scoring three times in one season (twice on tackle-eligible plays), the best single season ever for an offensive lineman.

A famous use of a tackle-eligible play came in the Monday Night Miracle when New York Jets lineman Jumbo Elliott caught a three-yard touchdown pass to cap a 23-point comeback against the Miami Dolphins.

During the 2018 and 2019 NFL seasons, Seattle Seahawks offensive lineman George Fant garnered attention for his frequent use as a hybrid tight end and extra blocker on tackle-eligible plays. During one 2019 Monday Night Football matchup against the Minnesota Vikings, Fant reported as an eligible receiver 42 times, and helped the Seahawks to rush for a season-high 218 yards and win the game, 37–30.

Tackle-eligible plays saw an uptick in usage during the 2021 season, which also saw the coining of a new term, thicc six (a play on the "pick six" in which a defender returns an interception for a touchdown), to describe tackle-eligible plays in which the eligible tackle catches the ball for a touchdown.

A controversial play relating to the rule occurred during a 2023 game between the Detroit Lions and Dallas Cowboys. Lions offensive lineman Taylor Decker reported as eligible to referee Brad Allen and scored a two-point conversion to give the Lions a lead with 23 seconds left. However, Decker was penalized for being ineligible, as Allen had wrongly reported that another Lions offensive tackle, Dan Skipper, was the eligible lineman on the play. The Lions were unable to score a two-point conversion on two subsequent attempts and the Cowboys won, 20-19. Decker, Skipper, and Lions head coach Dan Campbell all stated that Allen had reported Skipper's number in error, which was supported by video evidence, as Decker was talking to the referee and Skipper was jogging to the line a few yards away. Allen's crew was later downgraded and did not participate that year's playoffs.

== College football ==
Examples of teams employing tackle-eligible plays in college football date to at least 1912.

Current NCAA rules are less permissive than NFL rules and require that the five interior linemen, numbered 50 through 79, never line up as eligible receivers. If an offensive tackle wishes to line up as a tackle-eligible, he must physically change his jersey number to that of an eligible receiver (this, for example, happened in the 2015 Cotton Bowl, when an offensive lineman for Baylor switched from his usual number of 60 to 80 in order to perform the feat). A defensive lineman can line up as a tight end if his number is not between 50 and 79, as defensive players have no positional numbering restrictions in the NCAA.

A similar play is allowed from a kicking formation, where the requirement that all five linemen wear 50 through 79 is waived. During a fake field goal or punt, a team may line up with extra tight ends and receivers, which can confuse the defense about which players are eligible and which are not. This exemption can only be taken when it is obvious that a kick may be attempted, for instance on fourth down, in the closing seconds of a half, or similar situations; it cannot be used on every down at the college level.

== High school football ==
Tackle-eligibles are effectively illegal at the high school level; the rules of that level do not even allow declaration. The scrimmage kick formation was once exempt from all numbering requirements, but after the A-11 offense employed the formation as a base offense, the rules were modified in February 2009. No player wearing between 50 and 79 is eligible to receive a pass, and all ineligible receivers (except a long snapper) must wear between 50 and 79 in all cases.
