= Red zone (gridiron football) =

Area within the 20-yard line of the defensive team

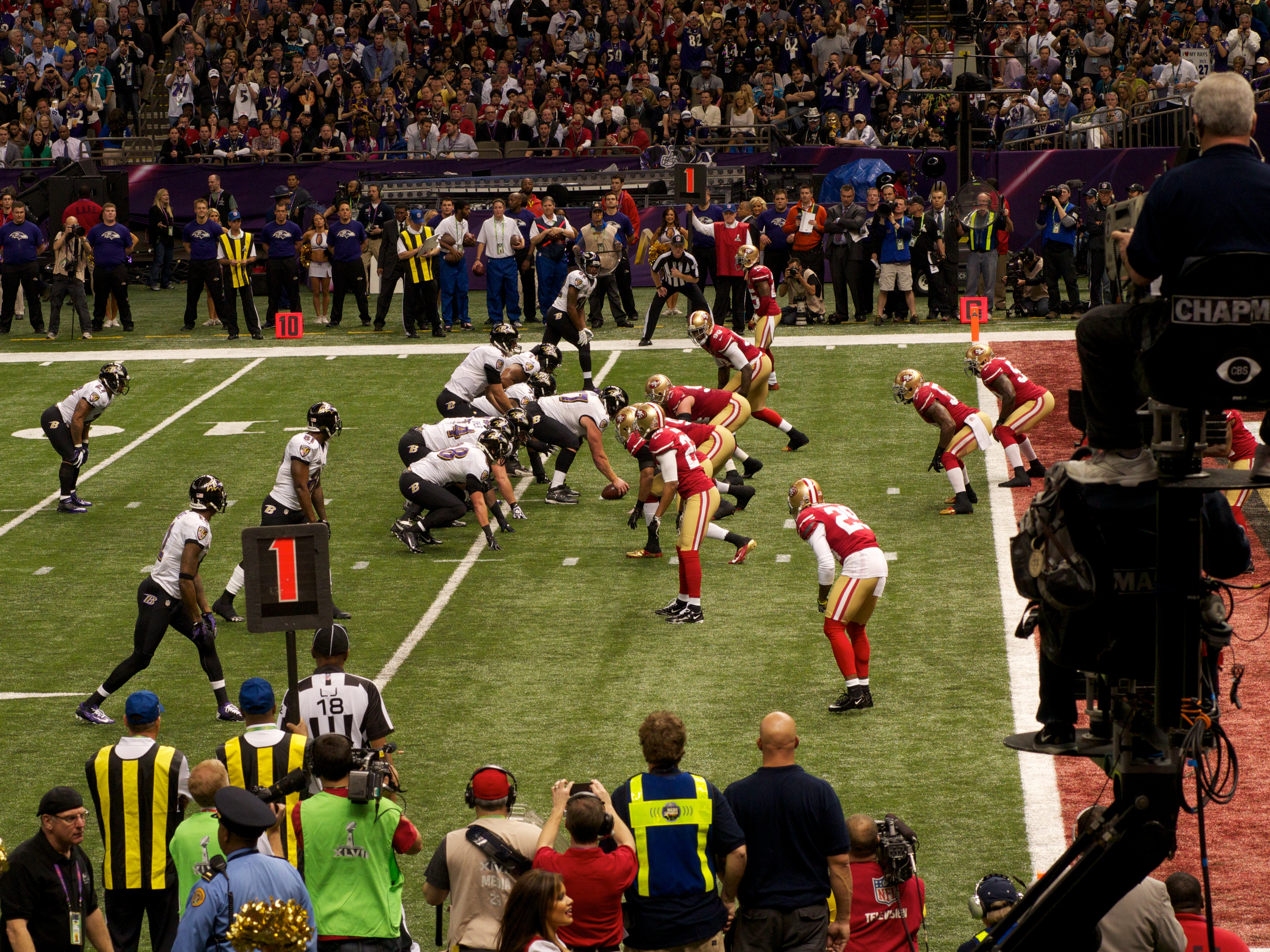
The Baltimore Ravens line up in the red zone against the San Francisco 49ers during Super Bowl XLVII

In gridiron football, the red zone (RZ), also known as the red area, is the area of the field between the 20-yard line and the goal line. Though some professional stadiums may have a decorative stripe indicating the 20-yard line (usually either team colors, or a red-white-blue stripe; some fields have it placed at the 25-yard line instead), the zone is not red-colored, and merely a statistical delineation. The term is mostly for statistical, psychological, and commercial advertising purposes (radio networks have been known to sell sponsorship of the red zone whenever the home team enters it). It is said to be a place where the chances of scoring are statistically higher. The term has been used since the early 1980s.

Being closer to the end zone, play while in the red zone involves closer cramping of the offense and defense. The short field of play means safeties have a smaller area to worry about defending, wide receivers do not have to run as far, and passes are not thrown as far. Though the distance to the goal line is less than other parts of the field, with all defenders being crammed into a smaller space and having less room to worry about defending, advancing the ball and ultimately scoring may be more difficult. The concept of the red zone is used in both NCAA Football and NFL Football identically.

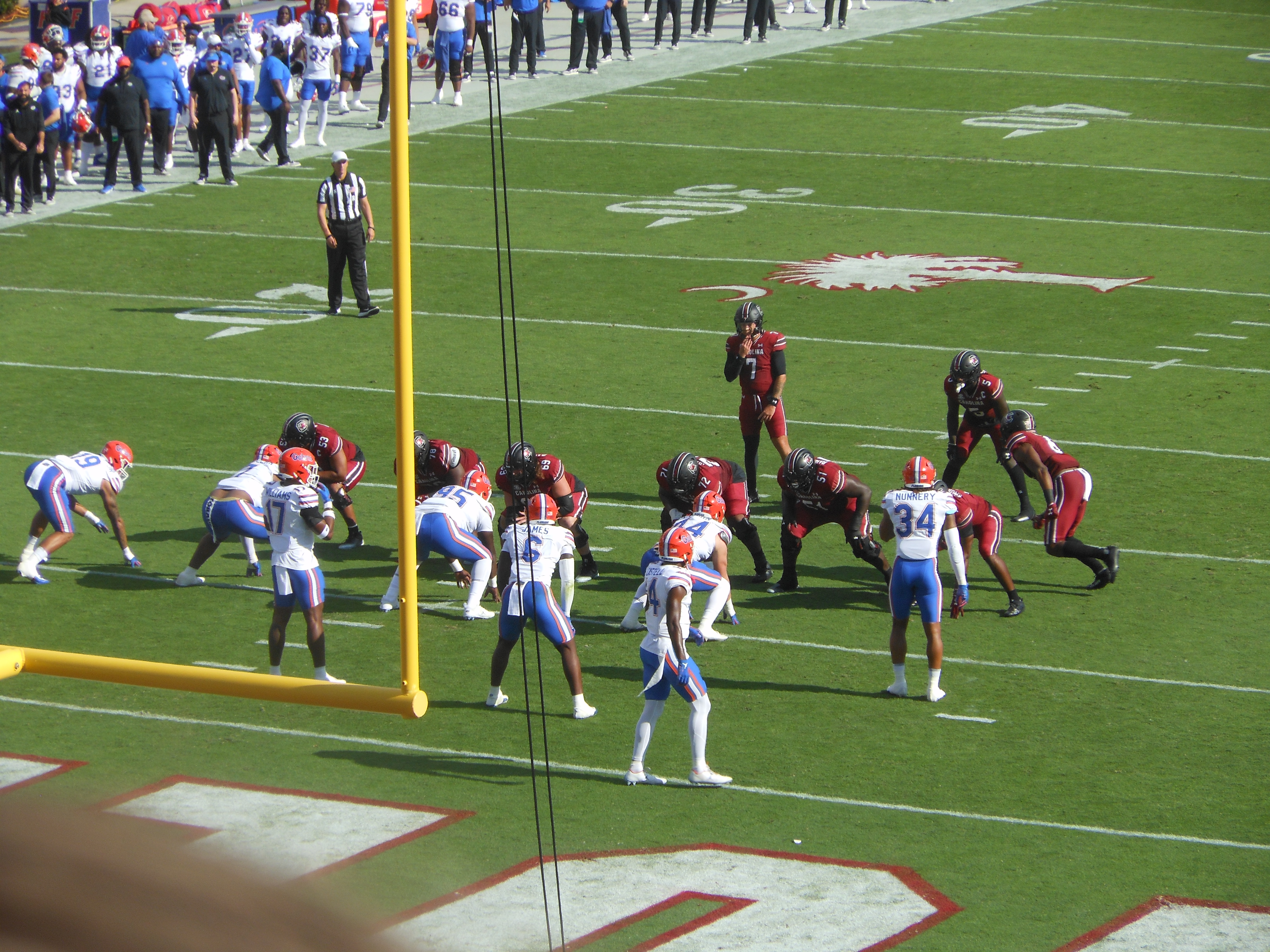
The South Carolina Gamecocks offense lined up in the red zone against the Florida Gators at Williams-Brice Stadium in October, 2023

The player spacing issues are less of a factor in Canadian football, where the end zones are significantly deeper and wider than in American football.

For all but the weakest amateur kickers, the red zone is universally within field goal range, assuring that points will be scored on a drive unless the team on offense commits a turnover, or a field goal is blocked or missed. As a result, ball control is a greater priority in most red zone situations.

Under the dynamic kickoff rules introduced in the professional game in the 2020s, the kicker must land the ball in the red zone without going into the end zone (to avoid a 35-yard touchback) or landing short (an illegal procedure penalty).

In the "Kansas Playoff" method of settling ties, play starts just outside the red zone, at the 25-yard line, thus most plays in that method occur in the red zone as the ball is advanced.

Dave Plati, a statistician for the Denver Broncos, is credited with being the first person to chart plays within the 20-yard line in 1981, though he didn't use the term "red zone." He said: “Other teams in the NFL started either asking or copying what [the Broncos] were doing. I think the Elias Sports Bureau [the official statistician for the NFL] picked up on it in the mid- to late-1980s.’’

Former Washington Redskins coach Joe Gibbs is widely credited with coining the actual term “red zone.” The Washington Post mentioned the phrase in an October 1981 article about Gibbs' plans to zero in on "red zone" plays.
