= A-11 offense =

Offensive scheme popular in amateur American football

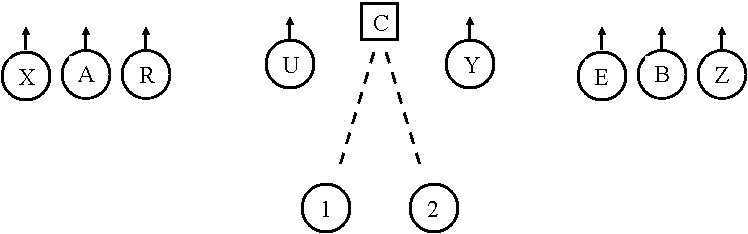
Typical offensive formation using the A-11

The A-11 offense is an offensive scheme that has been used in some levels of amateur American football. In this offense, a loophole in the rules governing kicking formations is used to disguise which offensive players would be eligible to receive a pass for any given play. It was designed by Kurt Bryan and Steve Humphries of Piedmont High School in California.

The scheme was used at the high school level for two seasons before the national governing body of high school football, the National Federation of State High School Associations, closed the scrimmage kick loophole in February 2009, effectively banning important facets of the offense. Due to rules regarding player numbering and eligible receivers, the scheme as originally designed is not usable at most levels of football, including the National Football League and college football.

The A-11 offense was to be the basis of the A-11 Football League (A11FL), a professional football league which was scheduled to play its first season in 2015. However, after announcing franchises names and scheduling "showcase games" in early 2014, the A11FL folded before taking the field.

== History ==
=== Development ===
The A-11 offense was developed in 2007 by head coach Kurt Bryan and offensive coordinator Steve Humphries at Piedmont High School in Piedmont, California. Coming off a 5–6 record in 2006, the coaches were looking for an edge to compete against other teams that fielded more top athletes. Bryan and Humphries found a loophole in the rules concerning allowable punt formations, which they used to design an every-down offense in which all 11 (hence the name "A-11") players were potentially eligible to receive a forward pass. Using the A-11, Piedmont's record improved to 7–4 in 2007 and 8–3 in 2008, with the offense often confusing defenses and scoring more points.

=== Controversy, banning, and modifications ===
While some high school coaches noticed Piedmont's success with the A-11 and began incorporating aspects of the offense into their own playbooks, others called the system "an unsporting act" and "outside of the spirit of the rule code". Bryan and Humphries began heavily promoting coaching clinics, instructional DVDs, and other materials soon after completing their first season running the offense, which also drew criticism from other coaches.

High school athletic associations in North Carolina, West Virginia, Louisiana, and the District of Columbia banned the use of the A-11 for the 2008 season. In February 2009, the National Federation of State High School Associations rules committee voted 46–2 to close the loophole allowing the linemen-free formations featured in the A-11. The system's creators petitioned the California Interscholastic Federation to allow use of the offense over the next three seasons on an experimental basis, but the appeal was denied.

The scheme's creators modified the system to comply with the rule changes in 2009. Though the offensive personnel is spread out more than in conventional formations, this version of the A-11 abides by the numbering requirements, making it easier for the defense to determine which players could legally go out for a pass. As such, it is similar to spread schemes from the early days of football such as the Emory & Henry formation. Unlike the original A-11, the modified version is legal in most levels of football.

== Basic concepts ==
The most striking characteristic of the A-11 is its use of a formation in which most offensive players except the center are spread out across the line of scrimmage standing upright. In conventional football formations, five or more offensive players are offensive linemen, who set up before each play in a three-point stance and who serve exclusively as blockers. Offensive linemen almost never carry the football and are almost always ineligible to catch a forward pass or even advance beyond the line of scrimmage before a pass is thrown. At most levels of football (including the National Football League (NFL), college football, and American high school football), offensive linemen must wear jersey numbers from 50 to 79, marking them as ineligible receivers in all but very limited situations.

In the A-11, however, offensive linemen in the traditional sense are not typically employed. Any player with any jersey number may be stationed anywhere across the line of scrimmage, and depending on their position at the snap, any player may serve as an eligible receiver on any given play. This was possible because, when the A-11 offense was introduced in 2007, a loophole existed in the high school rule books that allowed teams in a "scrimmage kick" (i.e., a punt or field goal) formation to be exempted from numbering requirements. Instead of employing five offensive linemen who are obviously ineligible to receive a pass, teams were allowed to station any player wearing any number anywhere on the field, causing confusion for the defense as they try to determine who might go out for a pass. And since there were no restrictions concerning when the "scrimmage kick" exemption could be used, the A-11 offense could be used on every down.

To use the scrimmage kick formation exemption, the player who receives the snap (presumably the kicker or placeholder) must stand at least seven yards behind the line of scrimmage. The A-11 places the quarterback in that position, which becomes a deep shotgun formation. This has the effect of reducing the need for offensive line protection since defensive players have more ground to cover before reaching the passer. The offense also places an additional passing back (similar to the wildcat offense) in the backfield next to the quarterback, creating the potential for either back to receive the snap, pitch to the other back, run or pass the ball, block, or go out for a pass.

The A-11 complies with the rule that caps the number of eligible receivers during any given play at five (maximum six if the quarterback hands the ball off or laterals to an ineligible receiver who then passes the ball). However, because players in the scrimmage kick formation can make themselves an eligible or ineligible receiver by going in motion or by simply stepping on or off the line of scrimmage, the defense does not know which offensive players will be eligible until just before the snap. This has the effect of confusing defensive personnel, as they must quickly figure out which offensive players to cover and adjust their assignments accordingly. The constantly changing offensive roles coupled with the deep position of the quarterback forced most opposing defenses to play a soft zone pass defense against the A-11, making it difficult to play standard run defense or pressure the quarterback.

In the modified version of the A-11 developed after 2009, the center is flanked by ineligible numbered "anchors", basically creating a 3-man offensive line in the center of the formation. Like any ineligible receiver, the anchors can neither receive forward passes nor advance downfield before a forward pass is thrown across the line of scrimmage, but can catch lateral and backward passes, take handoffs, advance downfield prior to a screen pass to an eligible receiver, recover a short punt behind the line of scrimmage, or even throw the ball if it is handed, punted or pitched backwards to them. Two other players spread out along the line of scrimmage must also wear numbers that automatically make them ineligible, resulting in formations similar to the old swinging gate or Emory & Henry formations. In this version of the A-11, the offensive players who cannot legally go out for a pass are clearly identified before the snap by their uniform numbers, making it easier for the opposing team to set their defense accordingly.

== Legality at various levels ==
=== High school ===
As mentioned, a loophole in the rules regarding punt formations allowed the A-11 to be used at the high school level until 2009, when the National Federation of State High School Associations rules committee closed the loophole. A modified version that complies with uniform numbering regulations can still be used.

=== College football ===
The scrimmage kick formation is allowed on fourth downs under NCAA rules and on conversion attempts, and a few situations which define a scrimmage kick formation with an additional requirement that "it is obvious that a kick may be attempted." It is otherwise not allowed for most normal plays, making the original A-11 impossible to use on an every-down basis.

=== NFL ===
The A-11 as originally designed is not legal in the National Football League (NFL) due to rules concerning the required jersey numbers of players at different positions. Players who play at positions that are usually ineligible to receive a pass must declare themselves as eligible receivers to the referee if they will be lining up at an eligible position in a formation. The referee then announces their eligibility before the play, negating the element of surprise that the A-11 relies on. The league imposed an additional rule to discourage teams from placing players with eligible numbers at an ineligible position (Bill Belichick had used such a strategy during select games in the 2014 season); as of the 2015 season, players with eligible numbers must line up in a position that makes it obvious that they are ineligible. The two-quarterback system is legal under NFL rules but (especially since the decline of the wildcat fad) seldom used, though the New Orleans Saints' success with a two quarterback system involving Taysom Hill and Drew Brees has resulted in a leaguewide increase in two-quarterback formations.

=== CFL ===
The A-11 was also not legal under Canadian football rules. There is no scrimmage kick exemption in the Canadian Football League (CFL). Persons who wish to change position from an eligible to an ineligible receiver (or vice versa) must physically change their uniform to a number that reflects their eligibility, and must seek permission from the official to do so.

Furthermore, until the end of the 2008 season the CFL rule book dictated that a designated quarterback must take all snaps, which made the two-quarterback system used by the A-11 (as well as offenses such as the Wildcat) illegal in the CFL. This rule was removed in CFL, mainly so that the Wildcat formation could be used. However, the A-11 is still unusable.

== A11FL ==
The A-11 Football League (A11FL) was a proposed professional spring outdoor football league that was led in part by A-11 creators Kurt Bryan and Steve Humphries and planned on utilizing the A-11 offense exclusively. The A11FL was scheduled to debut in May 2014 with two nationally televised "Showcase Games" and then kick off its first regular season with eight teams in March 2015. However, the exhibition games and the 2015 season were cancelled in April 2014. Soon after, the A11FL announced on its Facebook page that it was abandoning the idea of using the A-11 offense but that some of its founders would try to establish a different spring football league, though no further developments were announced. In 2019, Bryan was named head coach of the Oakland Panthers indoor football team; in 2024, he accepted a similar position with the Stockton Crusaders.

== See also ==
- Tackle-eligible play
- Wildcat offense
