= Illegal procedure =

American football referee hand signal

In the National Football League, an illegal procedure is used to refer to a number of different penalties.

== Types of illegal procedure ==
Some penalties are signalled with a generic "illegal procedure" signal. Examples are:

- False start
- Illegal formation
- Kickoff or safety kick out of bounds
- Player voluntarily going out of bounds and returning to the field of play on a punt

Some examples of similar penalties have their own signals. Examples include:

- Illegal shift
- Illegal motion
- Illegal forward pass
- Illegal touching of a forward pass
- Ineligible receiver downfield
- Illegal substitution

== Usage at different levels ==
It is used similarly to the professional level at both the high school level, and at the college level.
