= Ineligible receiver downfield =

American football rule

In gridiron football, an ineligible receiver downfield, or an ineligible man downfield, is a penalty called against the offensive team when a forward pass is thrown while a player who is ineligible to receive a pass is beyond the line of scrimmage without blocking an opponent at the time of the pass. A player is determined ineligible based on his position at the time of the snap. When the ball is snapped, the offense is required to have no more than eleven players on the field, out of whom only six are eligible. On most plays, the eligible receivers include the quarterback, running backs, fullbacks, tight ends, and wide receivers, while the ineligible receivers are offensive linemen, including the center, offensive guards, and offensive tackles.

The rule varies among leagues. In college football, the NCAA allows ineligible receivers to be a maximum of 3 yards beyond the line of scrimmage before the pass is thrown, whereas the NFL rule is 1 yard. The penalty in both the NFL and NCAA is 5 yards. The NCAA allows for an exception on screen plays, where the ineligible player is allowed to cross the line of scrimmage to go out and block when the ball is caught behind the line of scrimmage.
