= Uniform number (gridiron football) =

Numbers on the uniform of American football players

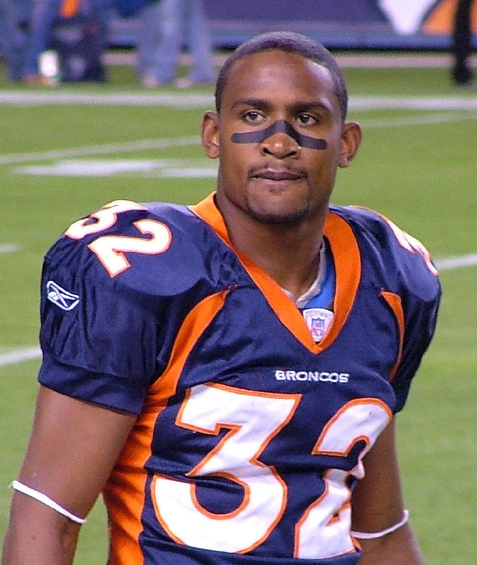
Denver Broncos cornerback Dré Bly with numbers visible on the front and shoulders of his uniform, 2007

In American football, uniform numbers are displayed on both the front and back of the jersey, and in many cases the sleeves, shoulder pad, or occasionally helmets. The numbers on the front and back are very large, covering most of the jersey. Certain numbers may only be worn by players in specific positions, thus assisting the officials in determining penalties.

At all levels of football, each player dressed for a game must wear a unique number from 0 to 99. The number 0, long prohibited in American football, has been permitted in college football since 2020 and in the National Football League since the 2023 season.

Players who wear numbers from 50 to 79 are, by rule, prohibited from catching or touching forward passes if their team is in possession of the ball and may not line up in a position that allows them to do so, unless explicitly indicated to the referee during a tackle-eligible play. Other than this, the correspondence between jersey numbers and player positions is largely a matter of style, tradition and semantics.

Canadian football follows a similar numbering scheme to that of American football, except that the ineligible numbers span only 50 to 69 and numbers 0 and 00 have long been available for use, although beginning in the 2023 CFL season a Canadian Football League team is not permitted to simultaneously issue both. 00 remains prohibited in American football.

== Professional football ==
The National Football League numbering system dates from a large-scale rules change in 1973, subsequently amended in various minor ways. As of 2023, players are generally required to wear numbers within ranges based on their positions as shown in the following table.

Number range	QB	RB	WR	TE	OL	DL	LB	DB	K / P	LS
0–9	Yes	Yes	Yes	Yes	No	No	Yes	Yes	Yes	Yes
10–19	Yes	Yes	Yes	Yes	No	No	Yes	Yes	Yes	Yes
20–29	No	Yes	Yes	Yes	No	No	Yes	Yes	Yes	Yes
30–39	No	Yes	Yes	Yes	No	No	Yes	Yes	Yes	Yes
40–49	No	Yes	Yes	Yes	No	No	Yes	Yes	Yes	Yes
50–59	No	No	No	No	Yes	Yes	Yes	No	No	Yes
60–69	No	No	No	No	Yes	Yes	No	No	No	Yes
70–79	No	No	No	No	Yes	Yes	No	No	No	Yes
80–89	No	Yes	Yes	Yes	No	No	No	No	No	Yes
90–99	No	No	No	No	No	Yes	Yes	No	Yes	Yes

Exceptions to this system do exist, including during the National Football League preseason with associated larger team rosters. The numbers used relate to the player's primary position when he is first assigned a number. If he later changes positions, he can keep his prior number, unless it conflicts with the eligible receiver rule; that is, only players who change positions from an eligible position (such as receiver or back) to an ineligible position (such as an offensive lineman) are required to change numbers if they change position. Additionally, during a game a player may play out-of-position, but only after reporting in to the referees, who will announce to the stadium that a specific player number has reported in (for example "Number 61 has reported as an eligible receiver") to alert the opposing team, other officials, and the audience that a player is legally out-of-position.

Although the NFL does allow teams to retire jersey numbers, the league officially discourages the practice for fear of teams running out of numbers; the rule book requires teams to make available retired numbers for new players should they exhaust all available numbers at a particular position.

The NFL rulebook does not specify an official jersey number range for long snappers. However, they typically wear numbers between 40 and 59, with occasional exceptions.

In the XFL, the NFL numbering conventions were followed with a slight exception being that wide receivers are allowed to wear single-digit numbers (i.e. 1–9); the NFL itself added that allowance starting in 2021.

== NCAA ==
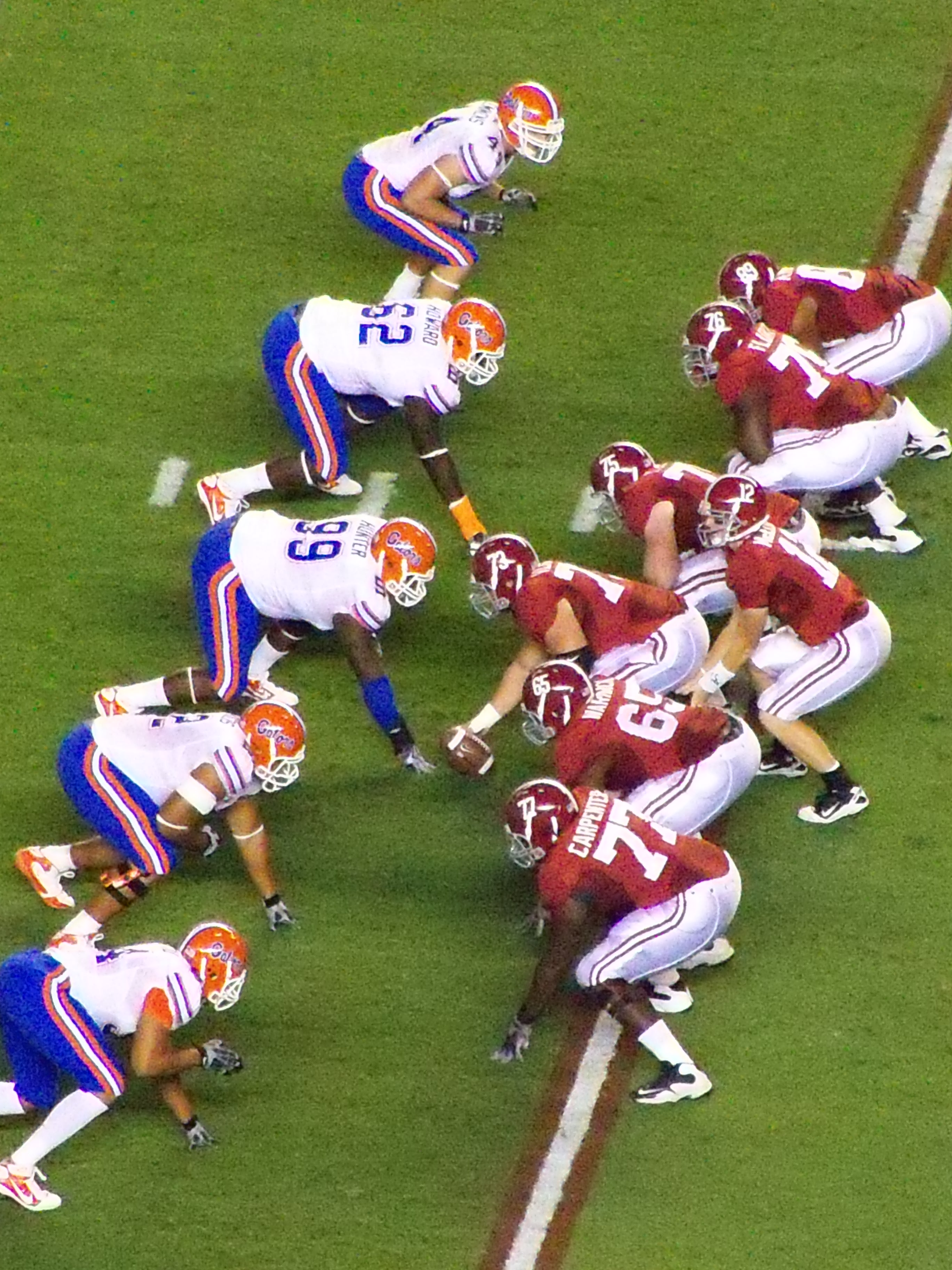
Alabama Crimson Tide football players (in red) facing off against the Florida Gators with uniform numbers visible on their helmets

According to NCAA rule book, Rule 1 Section 4 Article 1 "strongly recommends" numbering as follows for offensive players:

- Back 0–49
- Center 50–59
- Guard 60–69
- Tackle 70–79
- End 80–99

Otherwise all players can be numbered 0–99; the NCAA makes no stipulation on defensive players. Two players may also share the same number, although they may not play during the same down.

Starting in the 2020 NCAA football season, the use of duplicate numbers was restricted to only two players on a team, and players were allowed to wear No. 0.

Two players, both placekickers, have worn No. 100 in NCAA history. Both did so as part of centennial celebrations in the 1960s, with special dispensation from the NCAA: West Virginia's Chuck Kinder (not the writer of the same name), who did so in 1963 to commemorate the state of West Virginia's 100th anniversary, and Kansas' Bill Bell, who did so in 1969 to commemorate 100 years since the first organized college football contest.

== High school ==
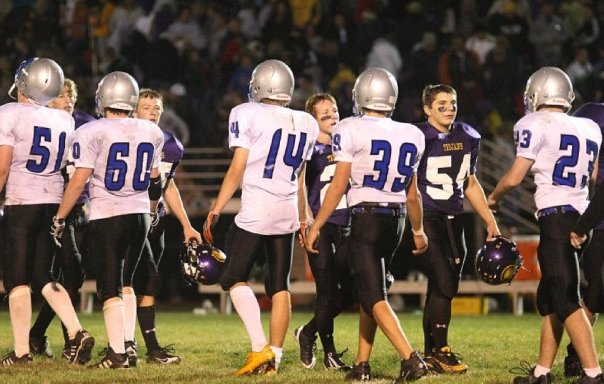
High school football players

On high school and other lower youth teams, jerseys with different number ranges are different sizes, and since many of these teams do not reorder jerseys every year, players are often assigned numbers based more on jerseys that fit them rather than specific position. Permian High School (of Friday Night Lights fame) in Odessa, Texas plays in the one state which uses NCAA rules for high school football; yet Permian's tradition is that quarterbacks will wear numbers in the 20s unlike most schools in college or high school.

Although previous editions of the National Federation of State High School Associations rule book indicated a recommended numbering system nearly identical to the NCAA's, later editions from approximately 2000 onward only indicate the bare minimum requirements: offensive linemen must be numbered from 50 to 79, while all other positions including backs and ends must wear numbers either from 0 to 49 or 80 to 99. The number 0 was made legal in 2022, although it remains banned as the first digit of a two-digit number.

In forms of the game that have fewer than 11 men (most notably eight-man football and six-man football) a player can wear any number. In eight-man, there are only three ineligible receivers and in six-man, all players are eligible receivers.

== In popular culture ==
Unusual uniform numbers have been used in comedy films, including:

- Three Little Pigskins (1934) – The Three Stooges wore "numbers" H_{2}O_{2}, ½, and ? (a question mark)
- Gus (1976) – the title character, a placekicking mule, wore No. 00
- The Longest Yard (2005) – Joey "Battle" Battaglio (played by Bill Goldberg) wears the number 10 but represented by the Roman numeral X.
