= ALPG =

ALPG may refer to:

- Australian Ladies Professional Golf; see ALPG Tour
- Abundant Life Prayer Group:
  - Prayer Tower
  - Oral Roberts Evangelistic Association (OREA)
- Alkaline phosphatase, germ cell an enzyme encoded by the gene ALPG
