= Oral Roberts University =

Private Evangelical university in Tulsa, Oklahoma

Coordinates: 36.05056°N 95.95245°W

- Motto: "Educating the whole man" "Mind, Spirit, Body"
- Type: Private university
- Established: 1963; 63 years ago
- Founder: Oral Roberts
- Accreditation: HLC
- Religious affiliation: Christian (Evangelical - Charismatic Christian)
- Academic affiliations: CCCU; CIC
- Endowment: $45 million (2019)
- President: William Wilson
- Students: 6,213 (2025)
- Undergraduates: 2,782 (2014)
- Postgraduates: 553 (2014)
- Location: Tulsa, Oklahoma, United States
- Campus: 323 acres (131 ha); Large city
- Newspaper: The Oracle
- Colors: Navy and gold
- Nickname: Golden Eagles
- Sporting affiliations: NCAA Division I - The Summit
- Website: www.oru.edu

Oral Roberts University (ORU) is a private evangelical university in Tulsa, Oklahoma, United States. Founded in 1963, the university is named after its founder, Oral Roberts, a renowned American Charismatic Christian preacher and televangelist. The university enrolled over 6,200 students as of 2025.

Sitting on a 385-acre (156-hectare) campus, ORU offers over 70 undergraduate degree programs along with 20 graduate programs across six colleges. ORU is classified among "Master's Colleges & Universities: Medium Programs". Its athletic teams, the Oral Roberts Golden Eagles, compete in NCAA Division I as a member of The Summit League.

== History ==
=== Foundation and early years ===
Oral Roberts University was founded in 1963 by Oral Roberts, an influential Christian televangelist. In the 1950s, Roberts began to privately discuss the importance of not only educating ministers, evangelists and other religious figures, but how these values could form Christian-focused educational institutions in the United States.

During the same decade, he had played a minor role in the establishment of a bible school. The early plans for ORU were to follow a similar strategy and to operate as a bible school for foreign students, with that idea first surfacing sometime between 1958 and 1960. While in a meeting with Pat Robertson, who at the time was forming the Christian Broadcasting Network, Roberts began recording the formal ideas for ORU on a napkin. By 1961, that idea had progressed and plans had begun to take place for its construction. In the summer of 1961, Roberts formally placed an offer on a plot of farm land in Tulsa, totaling 160 acres. An adjoining 20 acres of land were later included in the purchase.

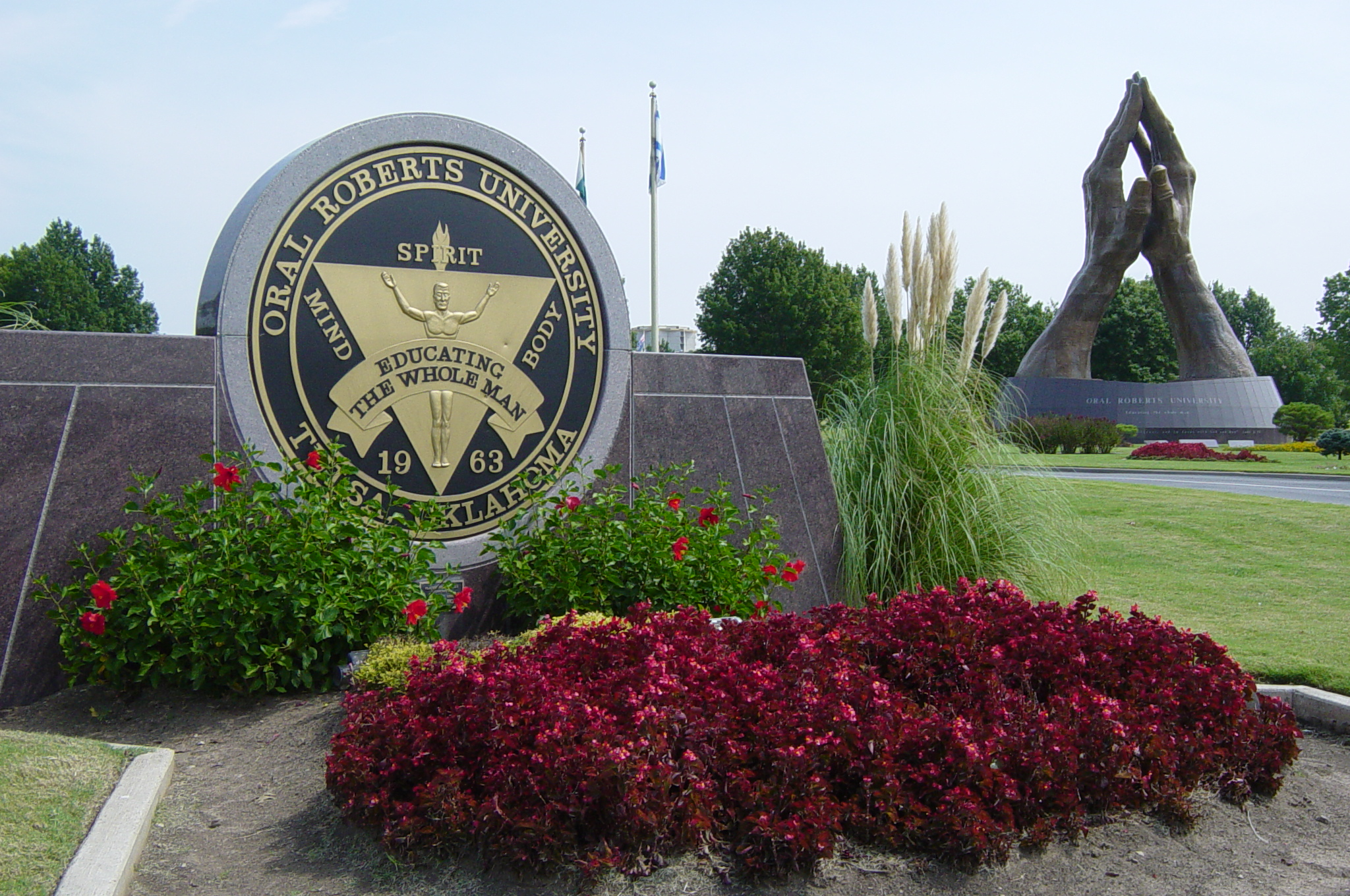
Main entrance to campus and The Billy Joe Daugherty Circle

Ground was officially broken for Oral Roberts University in 1962 in Tulsa, Oklahoma. The university received its charter the following year from the State of Oklahoma and Oral Roberts University officially opened in 1965 with an enrollment of 300 students and seven major completed buildings. The university was founded by Oral Roberts "as a result of Oral Roberts' obeying God's mandate to build a university on God's authority and the Holy Spirit. God's commission to Oral Roberts was to 'Raise up your students to hear My voice, to go where My light is dim, where My voice is heard small, and My healing power is not known, even to the uttermost bounds of the earth. Their work will exceed yours, and in this I am well pleased'." Roberts placed special importance on the Prayer Tower, even though the concept of a building specifically dedicated to prayer at the center of the campus caused considerable tension, as some academic leaders were afraid the school would be unable to receive accreditation with such a building. But the tower, designed by architect Frank Wallace, was completed in 1967 at a cost of $2 million, a further source of contention. After its completion, Roberts called for a three-day period of prayer and fasting. At the university's dedication ceremony in 1967, the evangelist Billy Graham was the keynote speaker.

The first partial graduation took place in 1968 and the first full graduation in 1969. ORU was accredited in 1971 by the Higher Learning Commission of the North Central Association of Colleges and Schools. It is also accredited by the Association of Theological Schools in the United States and Canada.

During the first decade of the school's existence many of the campus's iconic structures were completed, such as the Howard Auditorium, the Graduate Center, the Mabee Center, and Christ's Chapel.

The O. W. Coburn School of Law opened in 1979. In 1986 the university "shut down its ailing law school and sent its library to Pat Robertson's Bible-based college in Virginia", which subsequently founded the Regent University School of Law.

=== Campus expansion and later years ===
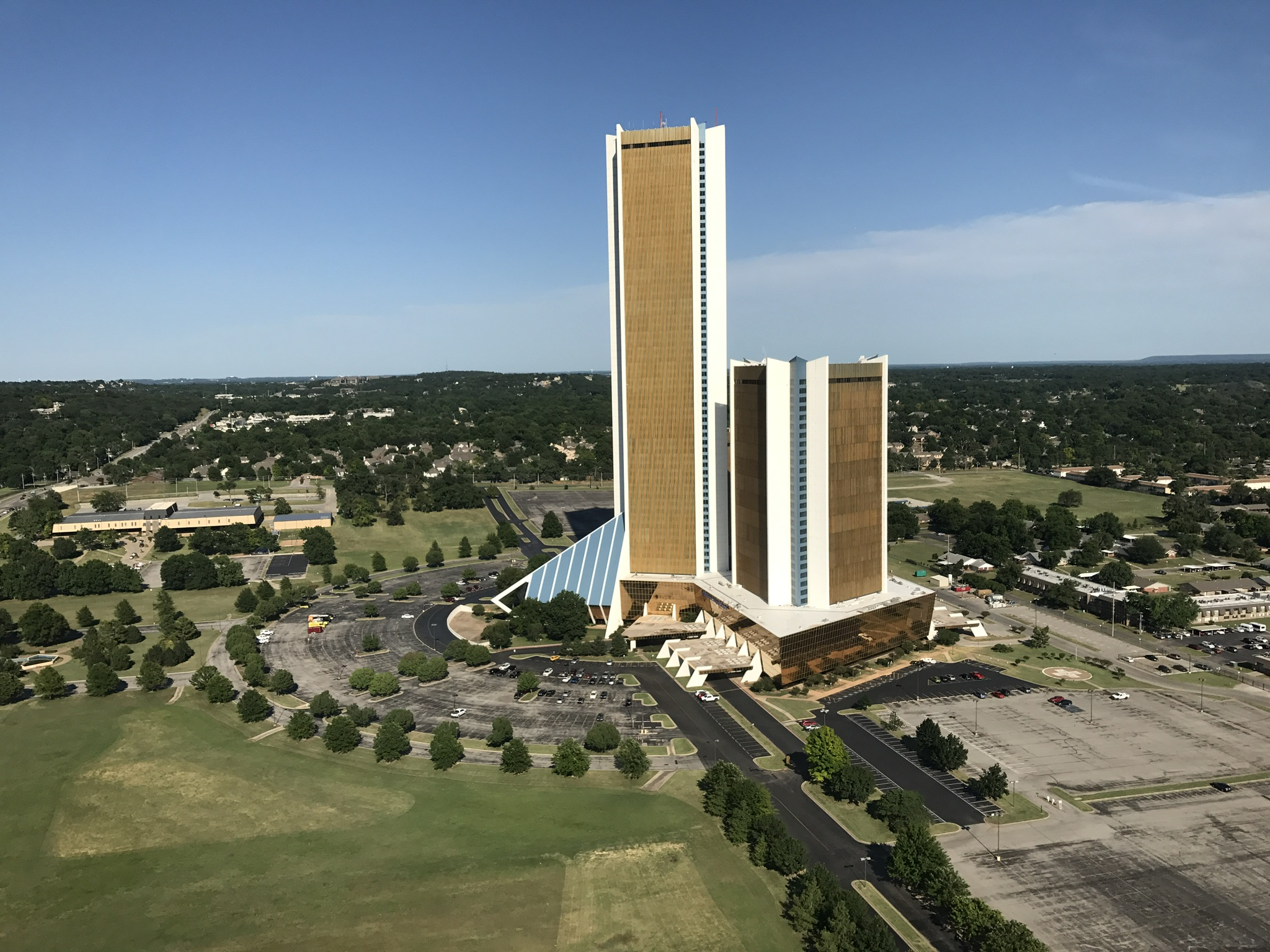
CityPlex Towers, originally known as City of Faith Medical and Research in Tulsa, Oklahoma

The university built the City of Faith Medical and Research Center hospital in 1981 and started the Oral Roberts University School of Medicine in 1978. Severe financial difficulties with both of these institutions led to their closure in 1989. Oral Roberts's son Richard was named president in 1993.

In January 1996, Golden Eagle Broadcasting, a digital satellite Christian and family programming television network owned and operated by Oral Roberts University, was founded.

On February 5, 1997, Reverend Bill Shuler apologized after several ORU students attended a mosque on the 28th night of Ramadan and prayed outside. The university stated it didn't align with university policy with The New York Times stated that worshippers and the group of students had different accounts of the incident.

In 2006, The Golden Eagles basketball team comfortably beat Kansas Jayhawks in an NCAA road game, 78-71. Kansas was the number 3 seed.

In February 2007, ORU announced that it would offer new art degrees.

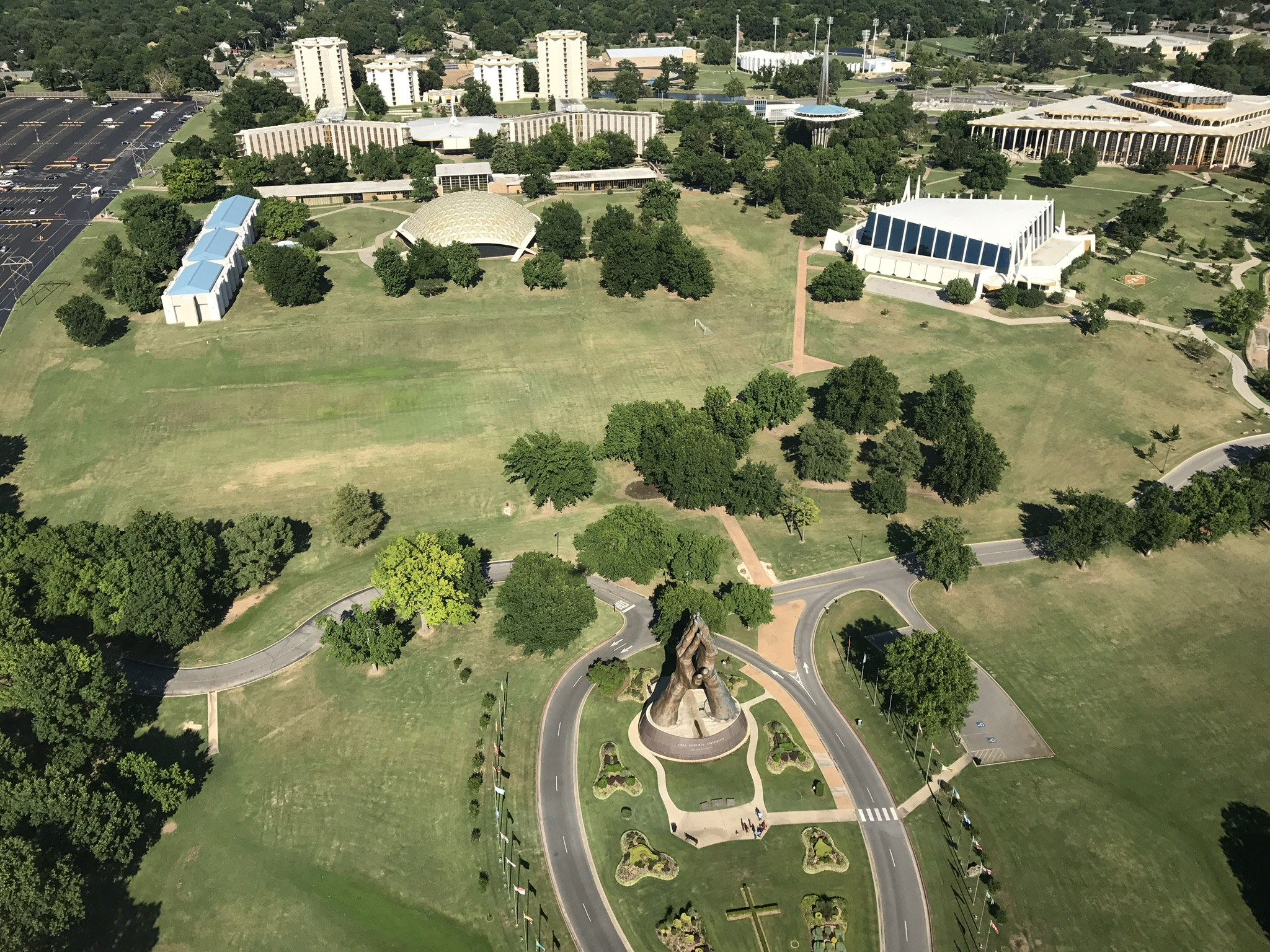
Oral Roberts University large healing hands entrance from the air summer 2017

In 2010, ORU teamed up with the National Hispanic Christian Leadership Conference to open a bilingual Hispanic Center on campus. The goals of this partnership include targeting a 25% Hispanic population within the student body and to reduce the approximately 50% high school dropout rate among Hispanic students.

=== Resignation of Richard Roberts ===
In 2007, ORU faced legal and administrative challenges, while also continuing to perform well academically. In February 2007, the university announced that it would offer new art degrees, further expanding its educational options to students. During the same month, Oral Roberts University was recognized by the Council for Higher Education Accreditation in 2007 for its work in the field of assessing the quality of student learning. Oral Roberts University was only one of five colleges selected by the council in the entire country for the accreditation in 2007.

Shortly afterward, three former employees filed a lawsuit against ORU, initially for wrongful termination. The suit was then expanded to include the personal conduct of university president Richard Roberts and his wife Lindsay. Numerous claims were made in the suit against Roberts, his wife, and the university's Board of Regents, including the misuse of university funds and an allegation Lindsay had an inappropriate relationship with a student. The couple appeared on Larry King Live shortly afterward, where Lindsay firmly denied the student allegation.

Lindsay Roberts, the wife of Richard Roberts, was accused of spending university funds on clothes, awarding nonacademic scholarships to the children of family friends and sending text messages on university-issued cell phones to "underage males." The lawsuit also alleged a longtime maintenance employee was fired for the purpose of giving the job to an underage male friend of Lindsay Roberts.

The plaintiffs filed an amended lawsuit adding the university's Board of Regents (Oral and Richard Roberts, along with George Pearsons, Kenneth Copeland, Creflo Dollar, Michael A. Hammer, John Hagee, Marilyn Hickey, Jerry Savelle and Charles Watson) to the suit and alleged that Roberts fired the university's financial comptroller and "voluminous materials and documents were shredded and destroyed, constituting spoliation of evidence." The filing also alleged Lindsay Roberts had spent nights in the ORU guest house with a 16-year-old male who also was allowed to live in the Roberts family residence on campus.

On October 17, 2007, Billy Joe Daugherty began to serve as Interim President. This was following Roberts asking to be granted a leave of absence, with the Chairman George Pearsons clarifying Roberts decision was not an admission of guilt.

In November 2007, the tenured faculty of Oral Roberts University approved by a simple majority a non-binding vote of no confidence in Richard Roberts. Roberts tendered his letter of resignation to the board of regents on November 23. Pearsons said the university planned to separate its finances and leadership from the Oral Roberts Evangelistic Association, to the apparent relief of many students and faculty members. On January 10, 2008, ORU settled with plaintiff John Swails, who was reinstated to his previous teaching position. The school also announced a formal search committee for a new president, to be headed by board of regents member and Tulsa resident Glenda Payas.

Tulsa evangelist Billy Joe Daugherty was named interim President and executive regent. The same month, the school was reportedly "struggling financially" with over $50 million in debt.

=== Finances ===
ORU's operating budget for 2007-08 was over $82 million. On January 14, 2008, ORU's board of regents voted unanimously to accept $62 million from the Mart Green family, the owners of Oklahoma City-based Hobby Lobby, Mardel educational, and various Christian supply stores, an offer which included changes to the university's governing board. In October of that year, an ORU spokesman said the university was still $52.5 million in debt. The school accepted an additional $8 million from the Greens in November. Of the $70 million given to Oral Roberts University, approximately half went toward eliminating its debt. The remaining half was allocated to "campus renovations, technology upgrades, academic enhancement, financial aid for new and returning students, marketing and operations", according to the university website. In February 2008, the Renewing the Vision campaign was initiated in an effort to erase this debt. To free the university from its burgeoning debt, the board of trustees announced plans for a $25 million matching campaign, in which the board agreed to match dollar-for-dollar all donations. In addition to eliminating debt, funds from the Renewing the Vision campaign contributed to the 2008 summer campus renovations, as well as scholarships provided by the university. During the summer of 2008, $10 million went to campus upgrades and deferred maintenance. Many dormitories were extensively renovated and most other buildings received restoration and upgrades. In January 2009, the university's presidential search committee recommended Mark Rutland, President of Southeastern University of the Assemblies of God in Florida, to succeed Richard Roberts, which the trustees approved. On January 14, Rutland confirmed that he had been offered the position and intended to accept it. The university began to implement employment reduction plans, laying off 53 employees and cutting about 40 unfilled positions. On January 29, 2009, the Green family committed $10.4 million to additional campus renovations and upgrades to take place during summer 2009. Following Mart Green's contribution, the university's debt was reduced to $25 million.

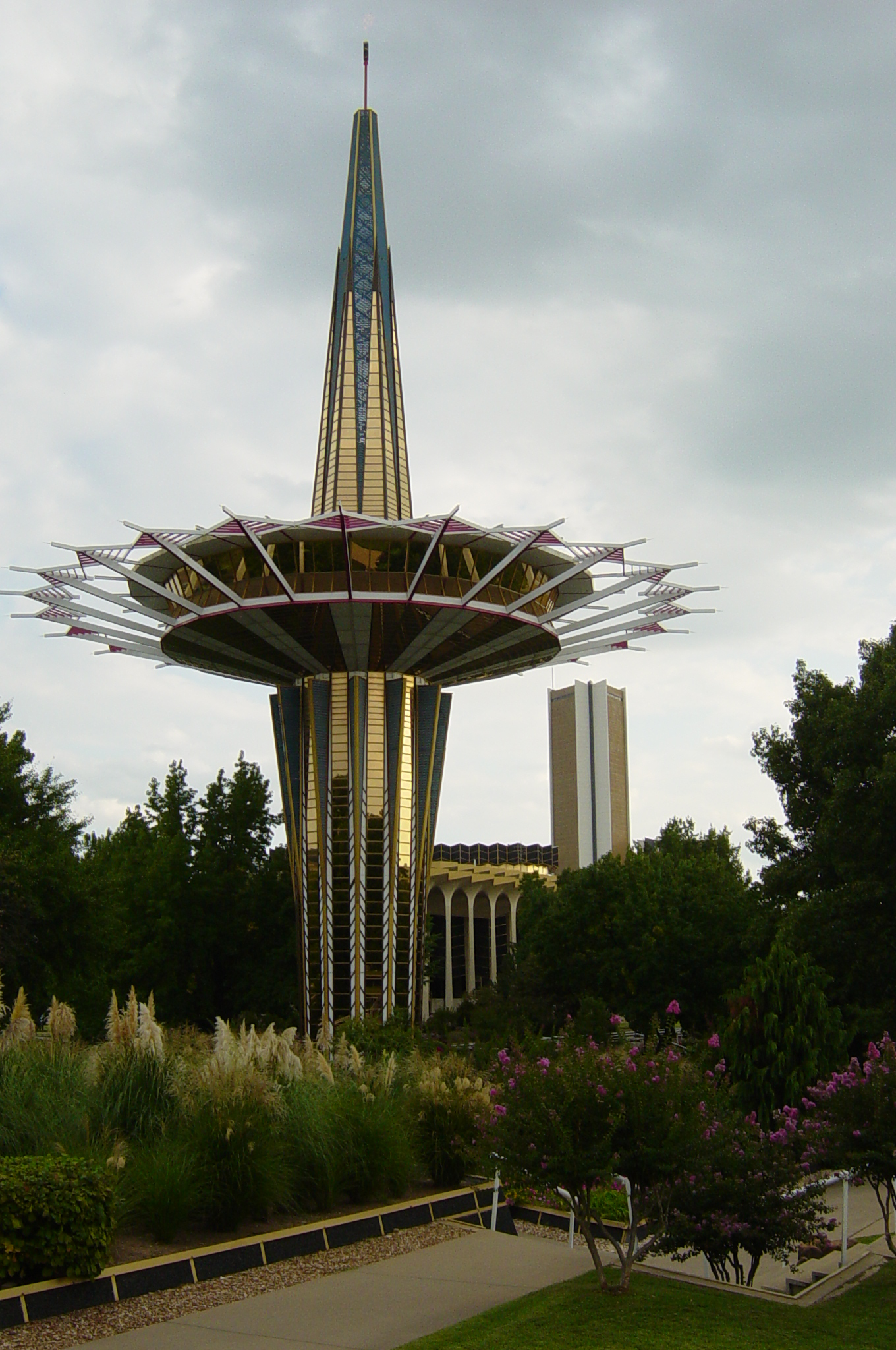
The Prayer Tower

On April 15, 2009, Chairman of the Armand Hammer Foundation and university trustee Michael Armand Hammer made a $1 million donation to the school's Whole Person Scholarship. As of June 3, 2009, donations and pledges had reduced the university's debt to $720,000. On September 23, 2009, it was announced at the end of the university's chapel service that the school was debt-free. The announcement was made two days before Rutland's September 25, 2009 inauguration ceremony, held at the Mabee Center.

In December 2010, ORU announced that the Green family would make another $10 million gift in 2011, to be used for renovations and technology improvements. The gift raised the Greens' total donations to $110 million.

=== Allegations of LGBTQ discrimination ===
On August 25, 2015, ORU Administration learned of student Sabrina Bradford's recent marriage to a woman, and two days later she was informed she was not welcome back on campus. As of December 7, 2021, an online petition to "Tell Oral Roberts University: Change your anti-LGBTQ honor code" had gained over 10,000 signatures. In March 2021, the Religious Exemption Accountability Project, or REAP, filed a class action lawsuit, Hunter v. the U.S. Department of Education, on March 26, 2021, against this campus and other named campuses citing the abuses that thousands of LGBTQ+ students endured at these colleges and universities over the years. LGBTQ+ students document their own direct discrimination, harassment and negative harms in the filing. Those abuses include "conversion therapy, expulsion, denial of housing and health care, sexual and physical abuse and harassment." The abuses also include the "less visible, but no less damaging, consequences of institutionalized shame, fear, anxiety, and loneliness." On November 1, 2017, president Billy Wilson preached a chapel service entitled, "Holy Sex" and quoted Leviticus 20:13: "If a man has sexual relations with a man as one does with a woman, both of them have done what is detestable, they are put to death." Within three months of graduation, Andrew Hartzler joined a class-action lawsuit against the U.S. Department of Education, seeking to strike down a religious exemption provision in U.S. civil rights law that allows ORU and other schools to receive federal funds despite such discriminatory policies. The lawsuit contends it is a violation of the Establishment Clause of the First Amendment and of the students' equal protection rights.

=== Presidential inauguration of William Wilson and recent history ===
On January 31, 2013, ORU announced that William "Billy" Wilson, executive director of the International Center for Spiritual Renewal and vice-chair of the ORU board of trustees, had been selected to succeed Rutland as president, effective July 1, 2013. ORU's student newspaper mistakenly named someone else as the new president.

In 2016, ORU applied for a religious exemption from Title IX, which would permit the university to enforce policies restricting LGBT students' conduct and enrollment in accordance with its religious beliefs. It was granted by the Trump administration in 2017. As a result of the exemption, Campus Pride listed the university on its 'Absolute Worst Campuses for LGBTQ Youth.'

In 2018, the university announced that it would retain Wilson as president for 10 years or at least until 2028. Under Wilson's presidency, ORU completed a $50 million developmental campaign, which helped construct its Global Learning Center and ONEOK Sports Complex. ORU and G12 Vision also announced in 2019 they had reached an agreement over a partnership. It was hoped that the agreement would make ORU's theological education more accessible worldwide. During Wilson's tenure as President, the university saw not only investment, but consistent expansion each year in enrollment. Student enrolment rose from approximately 3,000 in 2008 to over 4,100 in 2019. Its computing department also saw significant investment, with the National Science Foundation awarding a $500,000 campus cyber-infrastructure grant, which would dramatically increase network speeds throughout the campus.

In 2019, Whole Leaders for the Whole World campaign was launched by ORU, which included the university began its $75 million Impact 2030 campaign. The program focused on making ORU a "maximum global impact" by 2030. A component of achieving this global impact will be ORU's goal of educating students from 195 nations. Fundraising this campaign is due to span over three years and be divided as such: $62 million for buildings, $10 million for international scholarships in order to enroll at least one student from every country around the world, and $5 million for reconverting the university's current library into the Centre for Global Leadership. The David Green family has promised to match every campaign gift up to $45 million with a 3-to-1 match. ORU moved to virtual classes for the remainder of the 2020 spring semester after the outbreak of the COVID-19 pandemic in the United States. In fall 2020, students were required to get tested for COVID-19 before moving into the dorms. All students and staff were required to wear masks on campus at all times. The university also rearranged class schedules in order for the semester to end early.

In 2022, ORU announced that it has surpassed 5,000 enrolments for the first time in its history. Its continued growth under the guidance of Dr. William M. Wilson had seen the university nearly double its student head count in just over a decade.

In 2021, the university expanded its campus through the addition of 3 new buildings: a Welcome Center (which broke ground in April), The Peggy V. Helmerich Media Arts Center, and The J.D. McKean Library. The expansion was part of ORU's $75 million campaign, which allocated $60 million to these new structures with the remainder going towards student scholarships. ORU also announced in April 2021 the development of the 40,000 square feet Mike Carter Athletic Center and renovation of the Mabee Center. The Oral Roberts Golden Eagles basketball team had a run to remember in 2021, which led them to the NCAA Division I men's basketball tournament, their first NCAA appearance in 13 years. Not only did they reach the NCAA, but beat the number 2 seed Ohio State before also beating Florida Gators. They became only the second No. 15 seed to advance to the regional semifinal round in the history of the competition. They eventually lost to Arkansas Razorbacks, not before receiving national media coverage for their fairytale run in the NCAA.

The university was the recipient of two major grants in 2023, the first was the largest in its history from the United States Department of Education (DOE). The $2.2 million grant from DOE was five-year grant which aimed to further increase graduation rates, focusing on assisting at-risk students. It also completed the construction of The J.D. McKean Library in 2023, an $18 million three-story library.

The recent sporting achievements continued for the University in 2023, this time in baseball. In the regular season, the Golden Eagles finished as number 1 seed, following a 23-1 record. The Golden Eagles reached the College World Series after winning the Eugene Super Regional It was only their second appearance in the College World Series, with the previous coming in the 1970s. They won the first game against TCU, before losing to eventual finalists Florida Gators.

In 2024, as part of the continued efforts to expand and improve the ORU campus, the university broke ground on three new buildings. This included the Daystar Dining Hall, which would replace the existing Hamill Dining Hall. The other two buildings would be new residential buildings to house students as enrollment continued to grow each academic year. President Wilson stated at the start of construction that the "Hamill Dining Hall served the University for several decades and it has been a great gathering space for our students" and it was "not quite big enough for our growing student population." The construction was Phase II of ORU's Whole Leaders for the Whole World campaign and was scheduled to open in fall 2026.

At the start of the 2025 academic year, ORU announced it had surpassed 6,000 enrolled students for the first time. It also completed a refurbishment of the Learning Resource Center, which opened in August 2025.

== Campus ==
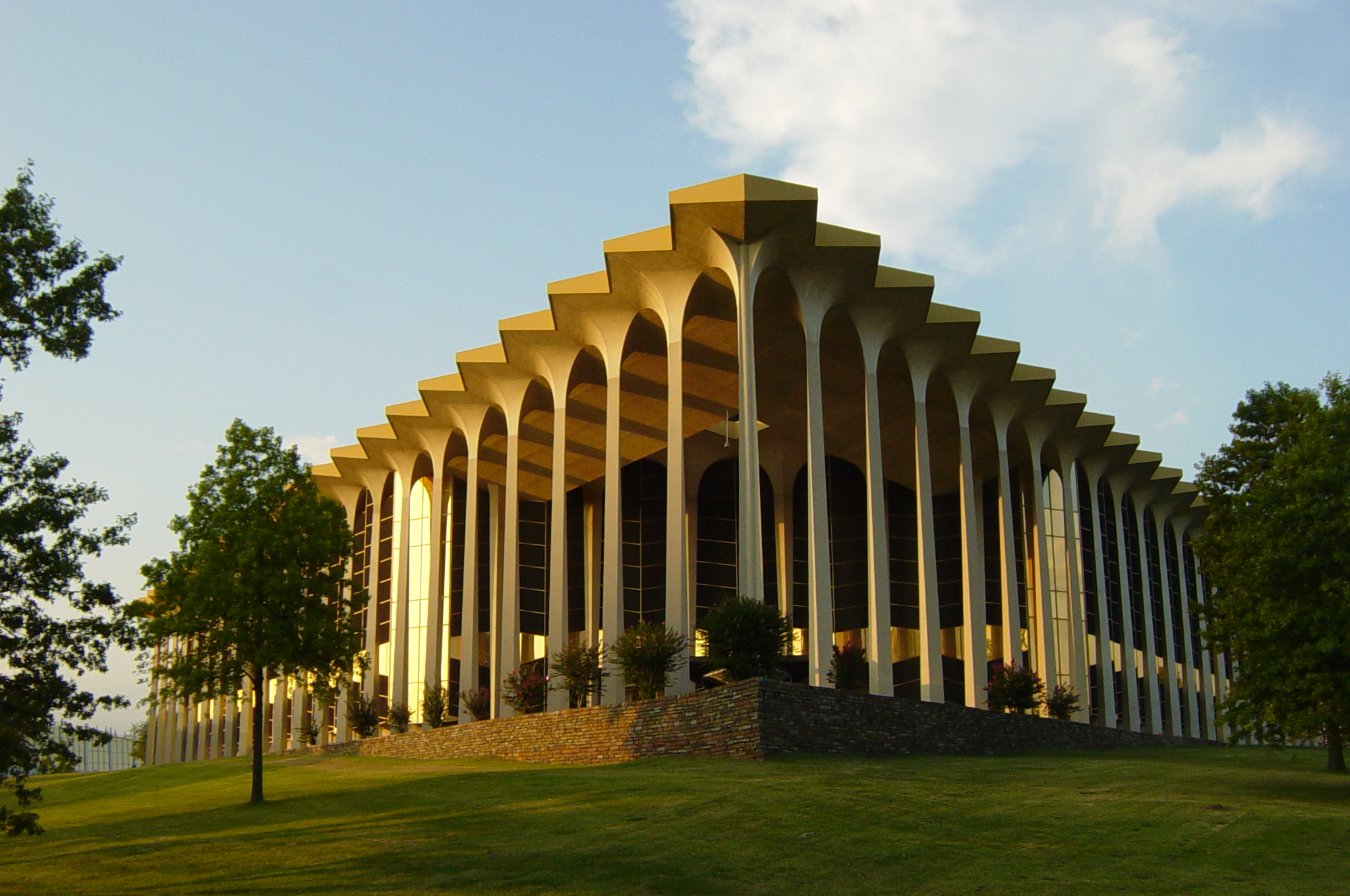
Main campus building, the Learning Resource and Graduate centers

The campus began construction in 1963 with a futuristic look and architecture, which historian Margaret Grubiak noted as being inspired by the 1933 Chicago World's Fair. Architects Stanfield, Imel & Walton of Tulsa designed the 1963 master plan, but most of the buildings were designed by Tulsa architect Frank Wallace. In 1981, the City of Faith Medical and Research Center opened. The buildings were south of the ORU campus, and were originally built as a 60-story clinic, a 30-story hospital, and a 20-story research center. The original tenants left in 1989 because of financial problems and a lack of demand for medical services. As of 2007, some floors (in the 20-story building) have never been leased. The facility is now mostly leased out as commercial office space under the name CityPlex Towers. A 60 ft (18.2 m), 30 ton bronze sculpture Healing Hands, by sculptor Leonard McMurray (cast in Ciudad JuÃ¡rez, Mexico in 1980) and originally in front of the towers, was moved to the ORU campus entrance in the summer of 1991. By 2007, the campus was described as "a perfect representation of the popular modernistic architecture of the time... the set of The Jetsons" but also "shabby" and "dated, like Disney's Tomorrowland." Interviewed in 2010, Wallace characterized his ORU buildings as "sculptures", noting that an inspiration for his artistic sensibility was "whittling since I was a kid". It has also been suggested that the buildings may have been inspired by Tulsa's art deco architectural heritage, along with Bruce Goff's individualistic style and creative use of new materials.

Maintenance of the many unique but aging buildings, structures, and architectural details on campus was cited as a growing problem for the university. In 2008, $10 million was set aside from Green family donations for long-deferred maintenance on many campus buildings, along with the Prayer Tower. The Green family donated another $10 million for work during the summer of 2009.

In 2011, the Prayer Tower was renovated and returned to its original function as a place for prayer.

ORU opened its Global Learning Center and the ONEOK Sports Complex, a track stadium with tennis courts in 2017. The campus added its first student housing since 1976, the Niko Njotorahardjo Residence Hall, in 2019.

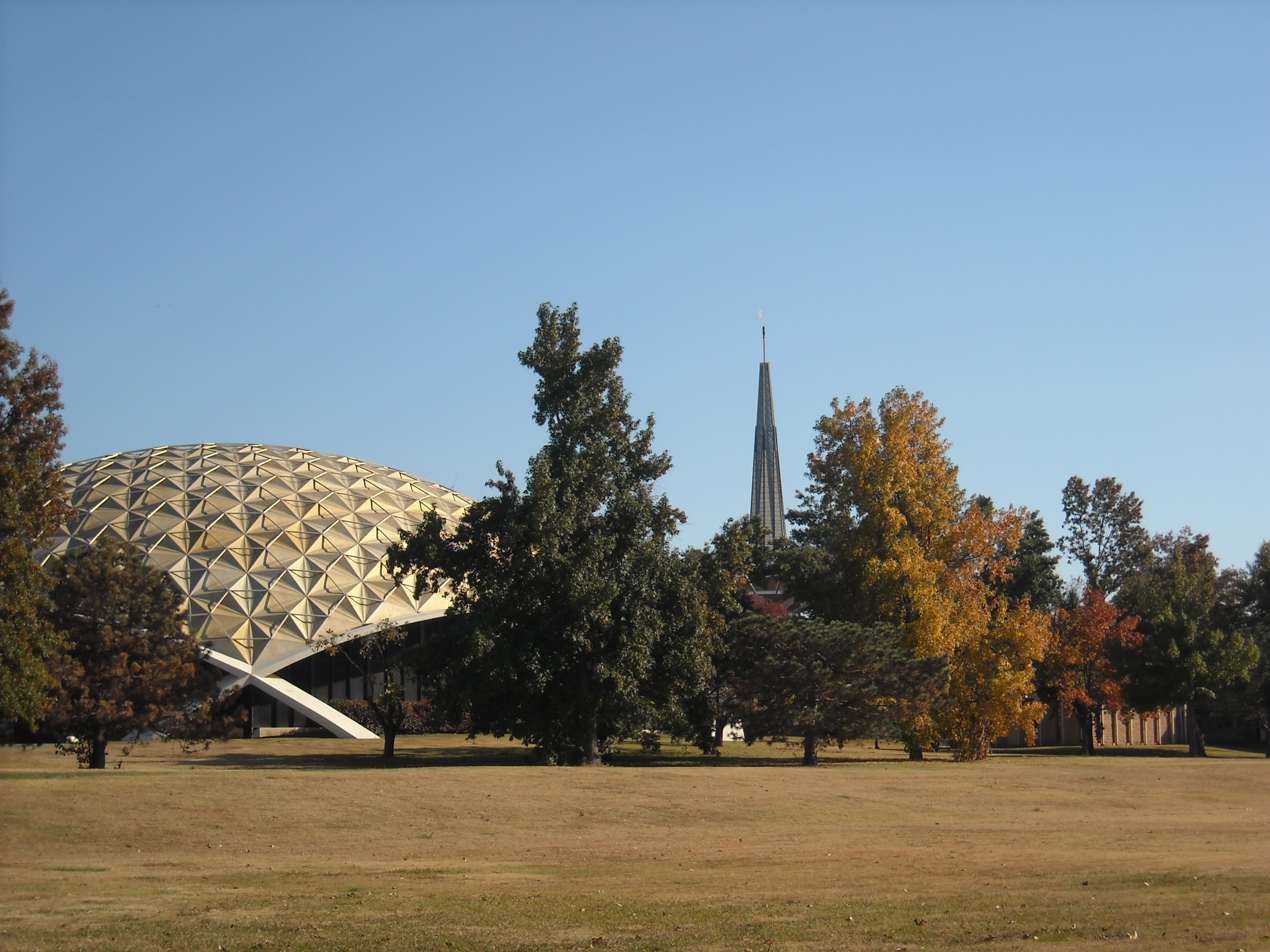
Howard Auditorium and the Prayer Tower (the gas flame at the top of the tower is barely visible in this photograph)

The front entrance onto campus is a divided, landscaped roadway, originally called The Avenue of Flags and now renamed Billy Joe Daugherty circle, lined with lighted flags representing the more than 60 nations from which ORU students have come.

The main academic building is the John D. Messick Learning Resource Center / Marajen Chinigo Graduate Center, an immense 900,000 square foot (80,000 m^{2}) facility with many pylon-like columns, gold-tinted windows and a lozenge-shaped footprint that university states was styled after King Solomon's Temple. The Howard Auditorium is a gold, Buckminster Fuller-style geodesic dome used for movies, theatre productions, classes and seminars. Biweekly university chapel services are held in Christ's Chapel, a 3,500-seat building constructed in drape-like fashion as an echo of Oral Roberts's early tent revivals. The Googie style Prayer Tower at the center of campus was intended to resemble "an abstract cross and Crown of Thorns" and also houses a visitor center. The Mabee Center is an 8,500-seat arena on the southwestern edge of campus and is used for basketball games, concerts, church services and satellite television productions. Timko-Barton Hall houses musical and theatrical performance halls as well as classrooms devoted to the university's programs in the performing arts. The building's performance halls are often the scene of concerts and recitals by performing arts students.

The Kenneth H. Cooper Aerobics Center houses basketball courts, an elevated running track, a free-weights and exercise room, a swimming pool and classrooms for students who are enrolled in health fitness courses (a requirement for all students). J.L. Johnson Stadium is a 2,200 seat baseball stadium located on the north of the campus.

The Armand Hammer Alumni-Student Center was designed by KSQ Architects, PC, and constructed and completed in 2013. It is the first building to be built on the ORU campus in decades. It houses the largest TV in Oklahoma, a "living room" for students, a gaming center equipped with Wiis and Xboxes, pool tables, ping pong, and more. The building is a modern design fitting for the campus. The building also contains restaurants and a coffee shop. The Armand Hammer Student-Alumni Center also houses student government offices as well as board rooms for special meetings. No classes meet in the building.

The Hamill Student Center is between Ellis Melvin Roberts and Claudius Priscilla Roberts Halls and houses restaurants on its lower level. Zoppelt Auditorium is on the ground level and is often used as a lecture hall for classes, forums and special events. Campus Security and the "Fireside Room" are also on ground level with the university cafeteria (called "Saga" by students) on the upper level.

=== Housing ===
There are eight residence halls on campus. The university has strict guidelines concerning student access to the upper floors of residence halls by members of the opposite sex, which is limited to designated occasions called "Open Dorms."

- Claudius Priscilla Roberts Hall is a seven-story building built in 1965 that can house up to 600 women. Called "Claudius" by students, the building is named after Oral Roberts's mother.
- Ellis Melvin Roberts Hall is a seven-story building also built in 1967 that can house up to 600 men. Called "EMR" by campus residents, this dormitory is similar to Claudius Priscilla Roberts Hall but has some differences, notably walls made of concrete blocks rather than sheet rock, two elevators instead of one and laundry facilities in the basement instead of on every floor. According to the university, these two tri-winged buildings are meant to reflect the Trinity.

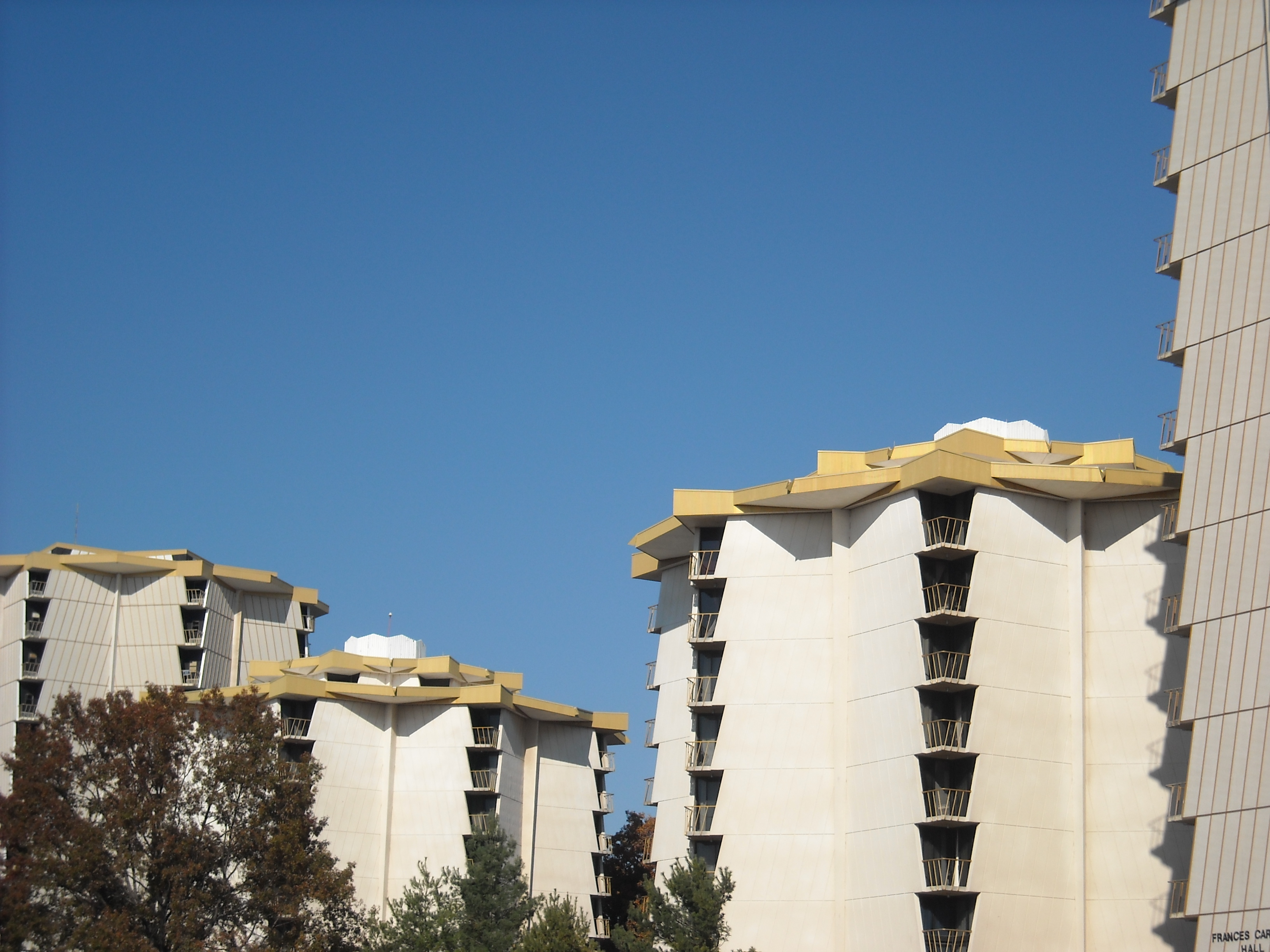
The four "Towers" residence halls, Michael Cardone, Wesley Leuhring, Susie Vinson and Frances Cardone

- Frances Cardone Hall (originally Ethel Hughes Hall) is a 12-story building for up to 372 women. This is one of the four "Towers" dormitories, meant to represent the Star of David. The building is called "Frances" by university students.
- Michael Cardone Sr. Hall (originally Edward Hughes Hall) is the twin dormitory to Frances and houses up to 372 men. It is linked to the three other Towers dormitories by a central hallway and the main lobby area, called the "Fishbowl" for its glass exterior walls.
- Susie Vinson Hall is one of two shorter "Towers" housing 244 women on eight stories and known as "Susie."
- Wesley Leuhring Hall, called "Wesley" by students, is the twin dormitory of "Susie" and is alike in both capacity and design. In the summer of 2017, Wesley was converted into a women's dorm and was to be called "Susie North."
- Gabrielle Christian Salem Hall is a three-story split-level dormitory west of Timko-Barton Hall and called "Gabby" by the students. It can house up to 240 women and has secured doors that open using university-issued cards. There are in-room bathroom facilities on the first and second floors.
- Niko Njotorahardjo Hall, named after the founder and senior pastor of an Indonesian church and ministry, opened for the fall 2019 semester. It was ORU's first new student housing project since 1976 and contains 240 beds in apartment and dorm style rooms.

=== Chapel ===
The university has two weekly chapel services in Christ's Chapel, which are recorded and broadcast live through the university's television station and also via satellite.

Typical chapel services feature contemporary worship, a missions offering, special music, and a sermon, usually from President Dr. William M. Wilson, as well as special guests. Attendance at Chapel is mandatory and attendance is taken by student leadership.

== Academics ==
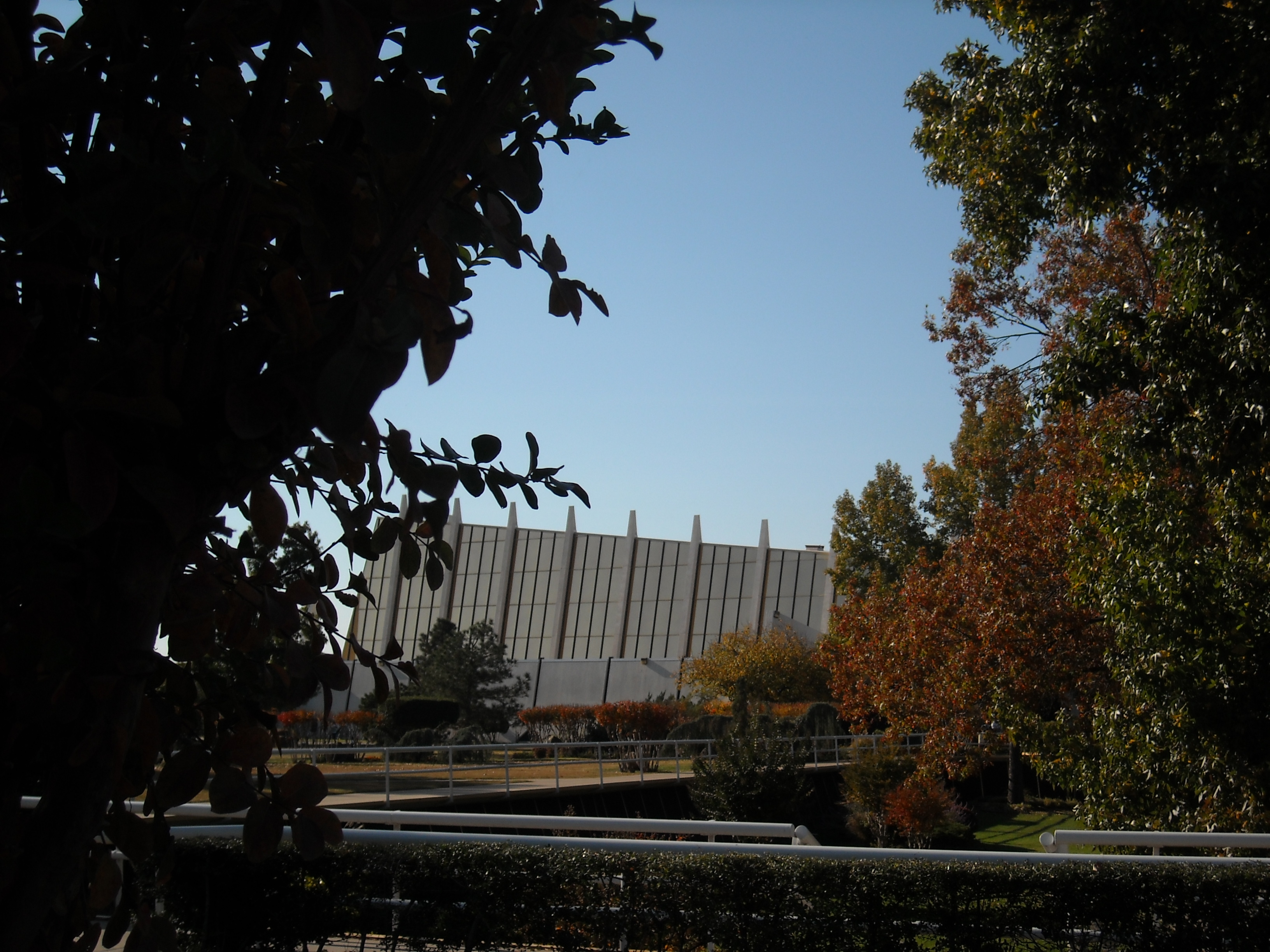
Christ's Chapel as seen from the gardens surrounding the Prayer Tower

ORU is accredited by the Higher Learning Commission. Some colleges and programs are accredited by specialized accreditors, including the Association of Collegiate Business Schools and Programs, National Council for Accreditation of Teacher Education, Accreditation Board for Engineering and Technology, Commission on Collegiate Nursing Education, and Council on Social Work Education.

In addition to its undergraduate programs, the university also has a graduate seminary and graduate programs in business, education, computer science, and data science.

ORU has signed an early assurance program with the Oklahoma State University Center for Health Sciences in 2011, allowing high achieving students to receive conditional admission to OSU's osteopathic medical school program.

From its founding, ORU has placed emphasis on Charismatic doctrines of Christianity; its initial presidential leadership, including Oral Roberts and his son Richard Roberts, also espoused the doctrine of seed faith. This belief was closely connected to fundraising efforts by both Oral and Richard.

While the majority of ORU staff were happy with including other doctrines of faith, some such as Charles Farah have disagreed publicly, indirectly leading to the publishing of a PhD thesis from a student a number of years later about his opinions on seed faith.

== Student life ==
The university's residential policy requires all unmarried undergraduate students younger than 23 to live on campus, although exceptions are made for students who live with their parents in the Tulsa area. Men and women are housed in separate dormitory facilities on campus with student access to housing of the opposite sex largely restricted. In addition to having a chaplain on every wing of each dormitory, there are also residential advisers for each floor, who enforce curfew, take attendance at Chapel services, and serve as "go-to persons" for students on their floors. Every Monday night is a mandatory Hall Meeting at which announcements are made by dorm leadership. The university maintains a delegation to the Oklahoma Intercollegiate Legislature.

All students are required to sign a pledge stating they will live according to the university's honor code. Prohibited activities include lying, cursing, smoking, drinking, and a range of sexual acts, including homosexual behavior and sex outside marriage. In early 2003, the student dress code was relaxed for the first time in 40 years and described as business casual. For most of the school's history, men were required to wear collared shirts and ties and women were required to wear skirts (an exception for winter months was added in 2000). In 2006, campus-wide dress code rules were eased further, allowing students to wear jeans to class and dress more casually in non-academic settings. Since 2009, men are allowed to have neatly trimmed facial hair. Restrictions on men's hair length were relaxed in 2013.

== Athletics ==
Oral Roberts University is a member of The Summit League after leaving its former conference home, Southland Conference, in July 2014. Its athletic programs include basketball, cross country, golf, soccer and tennis along with track and field for men and women. There is also a baseball program for men and volleyball for women.

ORU's early sports team nicknames were the Titans for men and the Lady Titans for women, adopted in 1965 by a vote of the student body. On April 30, 1993, all teams for both men and women became known as the Golden Eagles. ORU's mascot is Eli the golden eagle, who hatched out of his Papier-mâché egg on November 17, 1993, before the start of an exhibition basketball game as the official symbol of a new era in ORU athletics. The mascot's name is an acronym for education, life skills and integrity.

Notable players include: Max Abmas (men's basketball), Jose Trevino and Alex "Chi Chi" Gonzalez (baseball), Kevi Luper (women's basketball), Jeffery Gibson (track and field), Jack Whitt (track and field), and Austin Hannah (golf).

=== Basketball ===
The women's basketball team has appeared in six NCAA tournaments. In 2018, former NBA player Lee Mayberry was appointed as assistant coach for the women's basketball team.

Paul Mills has been the head coach of the Golden Eagles men's basketball team since 2017. On March 19, 2021, the ORU men's basketball team defeated the #2 seed Ohio State in the 2021 NCAA tournament as a #15 seed in the first round. This was the first time a #15 seed won an NCAA tournament game since Middle Tennessee defeated Michigan State in the first round of the 2016 NCAA tournament. ORU then defeated #7 seed Florida in the Round of 32 to advance to the Sweet Sixteen. It is only the second #15 seed to ever reach the Sweet Sixteen, after Florida Gulf Coast in 2013. Player Max Abmas was named the Summit League Men's Basketball Player of the Year in March 2021.

=== Baseball ===
The ORU baseball team has played in 29 NCAA regional tournaments. ORU advanced to the College World Series in 1978 and 2023. In 2006, ORU advanced to the NCAA Super Regional against Clemson, and in 2023 the Golden Eagles beat Oregon in the Eugene Super Regional. ORU baseball once won 12 consecutive conference championships and played in 12 consecutive NCAA regional tournaments (1998 to 2009).

== Notable alumni ==
Alumni include Daniel Amen, Jared Anderson (musician), Michele Bachmann (U.S. Congress member), Scott Thompson Baker (actor), David Barton (author), John Allen Chau (missionary who illegally approached the Sentinelese), Ulf Ekman, Amanda Frances (author and television personality), Tom Freiling (author and publisher), Kathie Lee Gifford (talk show host), Brian Graden (television executive), Michael Graham (conservative media personality), Kari Jobe, Teresa Knox, Don Moen, Matt Pinnell, Rachel Plakon, Lora Reinbold, Clifton Taulbert, Ryan Tedder, and Kelly Wright.

Alumni in religion include Kenneth Copeland, Billy Joe Daugherty, Ted Haggard, Adam Hamilton, Ron Luce, Joel Osteen (attended one semester), Paul Osteen, Carlton Pearson, Richard Roberts, and Marcos Witt.

Alumni in sports include Andretti Bain, Doug Bernier, Deondre Burns, Todd Burns, Paul Friedlander, Steve Holm, Keith Lockhart, Ron Meridith, Keith Miller, Mike Moore, Prince Mumba, Haywoode Workman, and Bob Zupcic.
