= Ashes to Gold =

- Author: Sherry Andrews and Patti Roberts
- Language: English
- Subject: Religion/Biography
- Publisher: Jove
- Publication date: 1983, April 15, 1987
- Publication place: United States
- Media type: Hardcover/Paperback
- ISBN: 978-0-515-08976-9
- OCLC: 20865544

Ashes to Gold is a book by Sherry Andrews and Patti Roberts, former wife of Richard Roberts, and daughter in law of faith healer Oral Roberts. The book offers a critical assessment of the Roberts' ministry and university. In a 1987 review Martin Gardner concluded Patti left Richard because of "her distress in watching Richard turn into a clone of Oral, and shameless way that she and Richard rationalized their jet-set way of life." Patti's "painful memoir" is cited as a scholarly source on Roberts and his ministry."
