= Abundant life =

Part of the Christian teachings

"Abundant life" is a term used to refer to Christian teachings on fullness of life. It is not an organized movement or a unique doctrine, but a name applied to the teachings and expectations of the groups and people who follow the teachings. Abundant life teachings may include expectations of prosperity and health, but may also include other forms of fullness of life when faced with adverse circumstances.

== Origin ==
The term "abundant life" comes from the Bible verse John 10:10b, "I am come that they might have life, and that they might have it more abundantly." "Abundant life" refers to life in its abounding fullness of joy and strength for spirit, soul and body. "Abundant life" signifies a contrast to feelings of lack, emptiness, and dissatisfaction, and such feelings may motivate a person to seek for the meaning of life and a change in their life.

Abundant life teachings, that God is a good God who wants to bless people spiritually, physically, and economically, were championed by Oral Roberts in the United States after World War II, with his faith healing ministry having the most effect. These teachings came at a time when many equated poverty with spirituality, and sickness with God's discipline and punishment. He included the term Abundant Life in the name of many parts of his ministries, such as The Abundant Life television program, the Abundant Life magazine, the Abundant Life Prayer Group (ALPG), and the Abundant Life Building used as his world headquarters.

== Teachings ==
Abundant life for a person begins with a new birth, a new relationship with God, new motivations, and a new relationship with mankind. The process of Christian maturity for that person continues with learning to live abundantly, being cleansed from sin, and learning to fight spiritual battles. Christian salvation and maturity is not reliance on the self-efforts of rituals, devotion, meditation, good works, asceticism, and self-control over desires, but by believing in the redemption from sin through the death and resurrection of Jesus Christ (Romans 3:24, 1 Cor 15:3–4). Through faith in divine agency, the working of the Holy Spirit, God transforms a person's desires to be more in conformity with God's will (Ephesians 2:8–10, Romans 12:1–2).

Abundant life teaches prosperity and health for the total human being, including the body, mind, emotions, relationships, material needs, and eternal life. The Bible, the good news (Christianity), and salvation are essential elements of those teachings. Other elements are faith, prayer, evangelism, and concern for human worth in the areas of spiritual oppression, poverty, disease, hunger, injustice, and ignorance. In order for these teachings to affect a person's fullness of life, it is essential for that person to align their goals with God's goals.

Abundant life teachings may include expectations of physical and material prosperity and good health and well-being, but may also include other forms of fullness of life, including eternal life, when persecuted or suffering. For a Christian, fullness of life is not measured in terms of "fun" and "living large", or in terms of wealth, prestige, position, and power, but measured by fulfilled lives of responsibility and self-restraint, and the rewards and blessings that accrue over a lifetime of pleasing God. According to the abundant life interpretation, the Bible has promises of wealth, health, and well-being, but these promises are conditional promises. According to James 1:17, God gives only good and perfect gifts, so God only gives gifts and blessings that are compatible with that person's abilities and God's goals for that person. This interpretation raises serious issues and presents a condemning and discriminating view of poor or disabled Christians in the apostolic times and throughout history.

The source of abundant life is identified as the Spirit of God in Galatians 5:22-23, "the fruit of the Spirit is love, joy, peace, longsuffering, gentleness, goodness, faith, meekness, temperance". A Christian is a person who has the Spirit of God (Romans 8:9) received according to the Biblical formula (Acts 2:38). Becoming a Christian means a change to a different way of life with a different purpose. Fulfilling this purpose and experiencing abundant life go together, as described by Matthew 6:33, "But seek you first the kingdom of God, and His righteousness; and all these things shall be added unto you."

== Closely related terms ==
These are terms closely related to abundant life teachings or lifestyles that include expectations of prosperity and health, but that may also include elements of a fulfilled life by responsibility and self-restraint.

Word of Faith
Also known as Word-Faith or simply Faith, the basic teachings are that of salvation through Jesus Christ and what that salvation entails. It is based on Jesus's teachings concerning the Kingdom of God and the Kingdom of Heaven and the state man can receive through the atonement and sacrifice of Jesus Christ. This state of new being or creation (found in the Bible verses 2 Corinthians 5:17 and Galatians 6:15) can be received only through faith in the Word of God. The Word of Faith interpretation of this new state includes material and bodily welfare.
Seed-faith
This is the teaching that the things received by faith start with a seed. The name "seed-faith" comes from the Bible verse Matthew 17:20, "If you have faith as a mustard seed, you will say to this mountain, 'Move from here to there', and it will move; and nothing will be impossible for you." Oral Roberts originally called this concept "Blessing Pact", which later became known as "Seed-Faith".
Full Gospel
A movement that places emphasis on the gifts of the Holy Spirit and that God wills for his children to be prosperous in all areas of their lives.
Prosperity gospel
Also known as prosperity theology, prosperity doctrine, or the health and wealth gospel, this is a teaching centered on the expectation that God provides material prosperity for those he favors.
Health and wealth gospel
A teaching which emphasizes healing and prosperity.

The terms prosperity gospel and health and wealth gospel are used as derogatory terms for Word of Faith or Word-Faith, but the terms do not mean the same things. There are significant differences among these teachings.

Oral Roberts laid the foundations of the prosperity gospel, but his teachings on abundant life and seed-faith have important differences from teachers of the Faith Movement. Even though Roberts was often associated with the prosperity gospel and the faith movement because of his close doctrinal and personal ties with Word-Faith teachers, his abundant life teachings did not fully identify him with that movement.

== Contrasting terms ==
These are other terms relating to teachings or lifestyles that contrast to expectations of physical and material prosperity, but that may include elements of a fulfilled life by responsibility and self-restraint.

Vow of poverty
One of the three evangelical counsels or counsels of perfection
Voluntary poverty
A form of self-discipline by which one distances oneself from distractions from God
Testimony of simplicity
A person's spiritual life and character are more important than monetary worth or the quantity of goods possessed
Asceticism
A lifestyle characterized by abstinence from various sorts of worldly pleasures
Simple living, or voluntary simplicity
A lifestyle characterized by consuming only that which is required to sustain life

== See also ==
- Pleroma
- The Prayer of Jabez
- Beatitudes
- This is Your Day
- E. W. Kenyon
- Kenneth Copeland
- Reinhard Bonnke
- Bill Johnson (pastor)
- Benny Hinn
- Kenneth Hagin
- Todd Bentley
- David Yonggi Cho
