= Oral Roberts Evangelistic Association =

- Formation: 1947
- Type: Pentecostal ministry
- Legal status: Non-profit
- Headquarters: Tulsa, Oklahoma, United States
- CEO: Richard Roberts
- Budget: $13,039,187 in 2010
- Website: www.oralroberts.com

Oral Roberts Evangelistic Association (OREA) is a Pentecostal ministry started by faith healer and televangelist Oral Roberts and currently run by his son Richard Roberts.

Originally operating as a traveling revival with claims of curing the sick, in 1963 Oral Roberts University was founded by the ministry. In 2007 following a lawsuit involving Roberts, the school and the association's finances were separated.

== History ==
According to Oral Roberts, his ministry began when God spoke to him and he was healed of both tuberculosis and stuttering. In 1947, he conducted his first healing service in downtown Enid, Oklahoma where Oral's healing ministry was launched. He then moved to Tulsa, Oklahoma, where he began to hold tent meetings. During the 1950s, Oral expanded his ministry through literature that was printed and distributed to people around the world, and through the launching of his television ministry.

He founded the Abundant Life Prayer Group in 1958 and soon phone calls for prayer were coming in from people worldwide. And in 1962, Oral broke ground for the Oral Roberts University.

In 1980, Oral's son, Richard Roberts, began his own healing ministry and became President of Oral Roberts Ministries. Richard currently holds healing rallies in the United States and nations around the world. Richard also hosts a nightly television program The Place for Miracles and Richard's wife Lindsay hosts a daily half-hour program Make Your Day Count that ministers especially to the needs of women.

== Finances and salaries ==
In 2007 it earned $12,952,755, but spent $14,966,687 leaving a deficit of $-2,013,932. In addition, it Net Assets $-15,261,450. In that time, Richard earned $477,122 a year as president and CEO, his wife Lindsay earned $196,818 a year as executive vice president, and his late father Oral earned $161,872 a year as a trustee. Charity Navigator gives OREA an overall efficiency rating of 1 out of 4 stars. GuideStar reports it "produces 52 weekly television and radio programs, and 260 daily television programs to help spread the Gospel of Jesus Christ in the United States and throughout the world. These programs reach an estimated 800,000 people per week."

In 2010, the OREA's 990 showed Richard Roberts was paid $496,088 plus $95,150. He also received $202,402 in compensation from Oral Roberts University, which listed him as "former president." His wife, Linda Salem Roberts, is paid $75,255 plus $150,700 and D. Michael Bernard earned $175,228.
