= Jerry Savelle =

American author and televangelist (1946–2024)

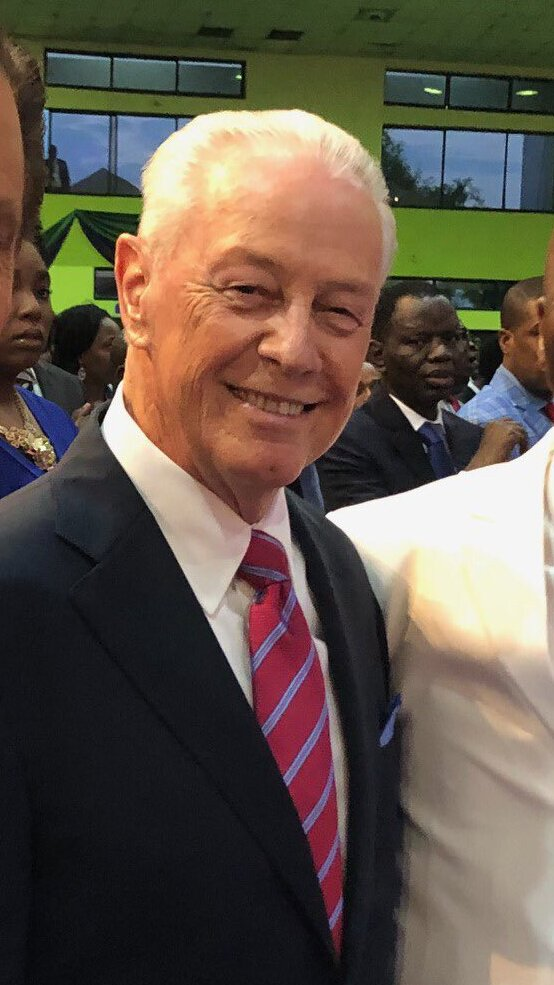
- Savelle in 2019
- Born: December 24, 1946; Vicksburg, Mississippi, U.S.
- Died: April 15, 2024 (aged 77)
- Occupations: Author; Speaker; Televangelist
- Spouse: Carolyn Savelle
- Children: Jerriann Savelle Welch, Terri Savelle Foy
- Website: www.jerrysavelle.org

Jerry Savelle Jr. (December 24, 1946 – April 15, 2024) was an American author and televangelist who was president of Jerry Savelle Ministries International (JSMI). He wrote over 70 books and preached in more than 3000 churches and 26 nations. JSMI has offices in Tanzania, the United Kingdom, Australia, Canada, and the United States headquarters in Crowley, Texas. He died on April 15, 2024, at the age of 77.

== Early life and education ==
Before entering the ministry, Savelle worked as an autobody repairman. He grew up on the racetracks and knew from the age of nine that he wanted to own an automotive business just like his father. At the age of eleven, while watching Oral Roberts on television, Savelle felt called to go into ministry.

Savelle went to college in 1964 and was married to Carolyn Creech in 1965. He opened Jerry's Paint and Body Shop in 1968; however in 1969 he again felt the call to go into ministry. In February 1969, Jerry gave his life to Christ. Early in his ministry he traveled and studied under Kenneth Copeland, another Word of Faith minister. He also was connected and friends with Oral Roberts, Kennith Hagin, and Lester Sumrall. He would later receive a PhD.

== Jerry Savelle Ministries International ==
Savelle first established his ministry in 1974 as a traveling ministry. His ministry has grown since then and now has offices in the United States, Australia, the United Kingdom, and Canada. He had a weekly broadcast at www.jerrysavelle.org and on Daystar Television Network

In 1983, Savelle authored If Satan Can't Steal Your Joy... He Can't Keep Your Goods, which has sold over 250,000 copies. Published by Harrison House, it became his best-selling book and is widely regarded as one of his most recognized teachings.

In 1999, Savelle's ministry published In The Footsteps of a Prophet. This book is a collections of notes and Savelle took when Kenneth Copeland preached in his hometown in the early 1970's.

Savelle was the Founding Pastor of Heritage of Faith Christian Center in Crowley, Texas. In January 2006, Savelle appointed Justin Bridges as Senior Pastor.

== Bibliography ==
- If Satan Can't Steal Your Joy...: He Can't Keep Your Goods 1983. ISBN 978-1-57794-464-5
- Giving - The Essence of Living 1982 ISBN 089274250X
- From Devastation To Restoration 1998 ISBN 978-0-9655352-2-9
- Sharing Jesus Effectively 1994 ISBN 0892742518
- Giving birth to a miracle 1981 ISBN 0892741716
- The Favor of God 2012 ISBN 0830764135
