= Billy Joe Daugherty =

American pastor (1952–2009)

- Born: William Joseph Daugherty; April 23, 1952; Magnolia, Arkansas, U.S.
- Died: November 22, 2009 (aged 57); Houston, Texas, U.S.
- Occupations: Evangelist, broadcaster
- Title: Founder, Victory Christian Center, Tulsa, OK; Founder, Victory Christian School; Founder, Tulsa Dream Center Founder, Victory Bible Institute
- Successor: wife Sharon Daugherty (2009–2014) son Paul Daugherty (2014)
- Spouse(s): Sharon Swift, 1973–2009, his death
- Children: 4
- Website: Victory Christian Center website

Billy Joe Daugherty (April 23, 1952 – November 22, 2009) was founder and pastor of Victory Christian Center (now Victory Church) in Tulsa, Oklahoma. He was also the founder of Victory Christian School, Victory Bible Institute and Victory World Missions Training Center (now Victory College). He was also briefly the interim president of Oral Roberts University. He graduated from Magnolia High School in Magnolia, Arkansas in 1970.

== Ministry ==
Victory Christian Center built the Tulsa Dream Center, which houses a food and clothing distribution, dental/medical clinic, legal counseling, recreation facilities and other programs to help needy people of Tulsa. Victory's bus ministry brings 1,000 - 1,200 children and teens from this area each Saturday for Kidz Ministry and S.O.U.L. Youth ministry.

On November 20, 2005, a 50-year-old man named Steven Wayne Rogers came forward for an altar call at Victory Christian Center and punched Daugherty twice in the face, opening a cut over his left eye that required two stitches. Daugherty stumbled back onto the stage away from Rogers and prayed that God would forgive Rogers and bless him. Later that evening Daugherty visited Rogers in the Tulsa county jail to discuss the reasons for the attack. Rogers showed no remorse for what he had done. "He said he'd do whatever he wants, to whomever he wants, whenever he wants," Daugherty said. Daugherty did not press charges against Steven Rogers for the assault.

== Lectures and Publications ==
Daugherty's daily radio and television broadcast, Victory in Jesus, reaches more than 100 million households in North America as well as via satellite and the internet internationally. He was the author of Knocked Down But Not Out, This New Life, Building Stronger Marriages, Families, and Led By the Spirit. He and his wife Sharon authored over a dozen books.

On March 4, 2007, Daugherty dedicated the church's new 4500 seat sanctuary on the church's property. Within weeks all services were moved from the Mabee Center on the grounds of Oral Roberts University across the street to the new sanctuary.

On October 17, 2007, Daugherty was named Executive regent of Oral Roberts University in the wake of numerous allegations of impropriety involving ORU President Richard Roberts and his wife, Lindsay Roberts.

Daugherty's role as Executive Regent included serving as acting president of ORU for a short time until ORU Provost Ralph Fagin assumed the position.

In 2009, the church launched a 13-episode television show on TBN called "360 Degree Life" which featured street interviews, animations, testimonies and preaching.

As of January 2010, Victory Christian Center reported an average Sunday attendance of 9,612, and was reported to be the second largest church in Tulsa.

== Personal life ==
He and his wife, Sharon, had four children.

In October 2009, Daugherty was diagnosed with non-Hodgkin's lymphoma, of which he died at the M.D. Anderson Cancer Center in Houston, Texas, aged 57 on November 22, 2009. Daugherty's last appearance at Victory Christian Center was on October 17, 2009, as he officiated youngest son Paul's wedding to his wife Ashley McAuliff. A memorial service for Daugherty was held at the Mabee Center in Tulsa on November 30.
