= Richard Roberts (evangelist) =

American evangelist (born 1948)

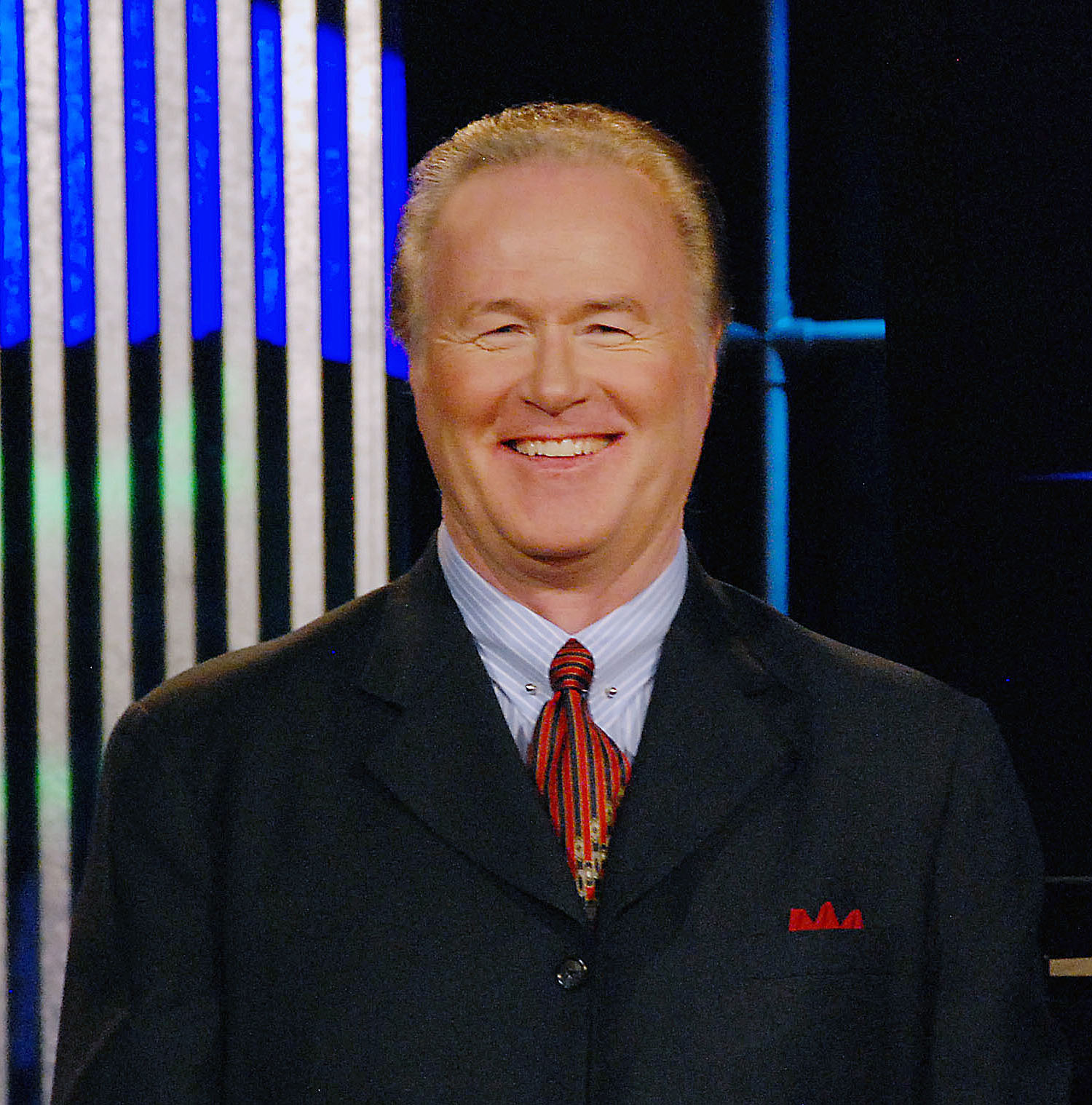
- Born: November 12, 1948 (age 77); Tulsa, Oklahoma, U.S.
- Education: Oral Roberts University (BA, MA, DMin)
- Occupations: Evangelist, broadcaster, educator
- Title: President and CEO of Oral Roberts Evangelistic Association
- Spouses: Lindsay Roberts; Patti Thompson (divorced)
- Children: Christi, Juli, Richard Oral (deceased 1984), Jordan, Olivia and Chloe
- Parent(s): Oral Roberts (deceased); Evelyn Roberts (deceased)
- Website: http://www.oralroberts.com/

Richard Lee Roberts (born November 12, 1948) is an American television evangelist and faith healer who serves as the chairman and chief executive officer of the Oral Roberts Evangelistic Association. He previously served fifteen years as the president of Oral Roberts University.

== Early life and education ==
Richard Lee Roberts was born on November 12, 1948, in Tulsa, Oklahoma, the son of evangelist Granville Oral Roberts and schoolteacher Evelyn Lutman Roberts. The third of four children, Richard had an older sister, Rebecca Ann, who was killed, along with her husband, Marshall Nash, in a plane crash in 1977; and an older brother, Ronald David, who committed suicide in 1982, six months after coming out as homosexual, and five months after entering a drug rehabilitation facility. Roberts's younger sister, Roberta Jean Potts, is a practicing attorney in Tulsa.

As a young boy, Roberts watched his father travel the United States and the world conducting healing meetings, where he would preach and pray for the sick. At times, his father and mother were gone for periods as long as six weeks. When school permitted, Roberts accompanied his father on trips and dreamed of having a healing ministry of his own; many times walking by his side as his father prayed for people in the "invalid tent". During the portions of the services where his father prayed for people, Roberts was often standing on his chair, clapping when people were healed.

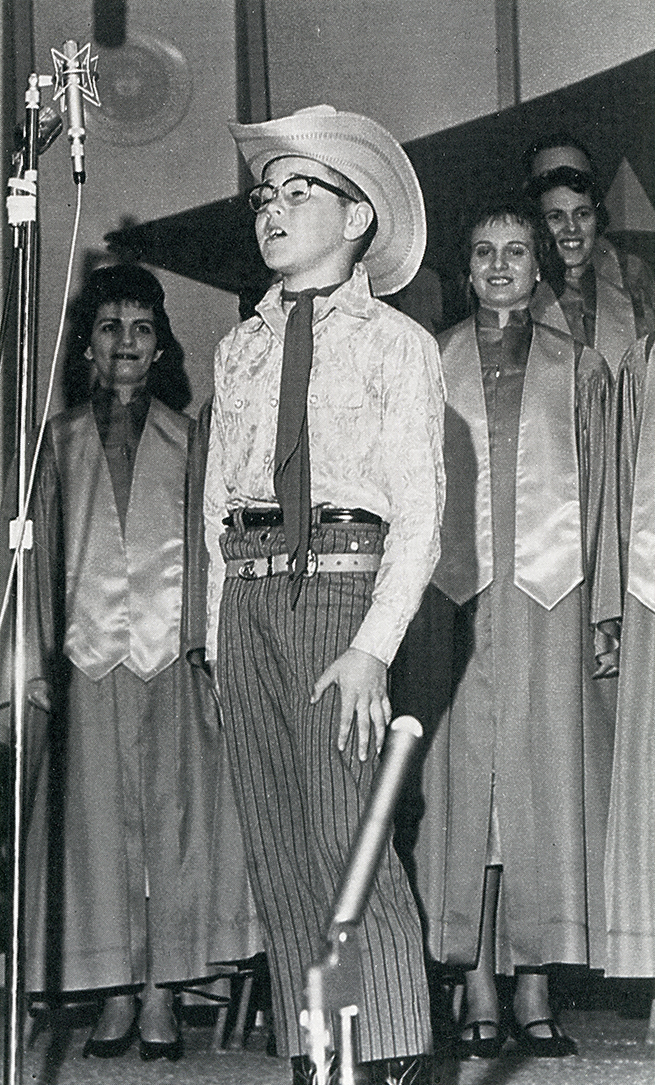
Richard singing at his father's crusades

At age 5, Roberts had his first public performance at an Oral Roberts crusade in Baltimore, Maryland, where he stood on a chair to sing "I Believe." Around the same time, his father began to teach him golf; the first time he swung the club, Roberts sent a ball through the family's living room window. In the book Expect A Miracle: My Life and Ministry, Oral Roberts wrote about the bond he and his son Richard built through playing golf.

Though drawn to ministry, the attention his father drew made Roberts uncomfortable, leading to teasing at school. Roberts wrote, "I came home from school many a day with my shirt torn and my nose bloodied from being in fights with the other kids who made fun of me, my dad and the healing ministry of Jesus Christ." As a teenager, with the negative press his father was receiving and pressure from his father to sing at crusades, he began to pull away from involvement with his father's ministry and began pursuing other talents and interests, such as singing. Roberts learned to play the guitar and performed around Oklahoma, dreaming of a career as a nightclub singer in Las Vegas. In 1966, he played the lead in his high school's production of The Sound of Music and was offered a scholarship to Interlochen.

Graduating from Memorial High School in May 1966 Roberts attended University of Kansas, intending to study music.

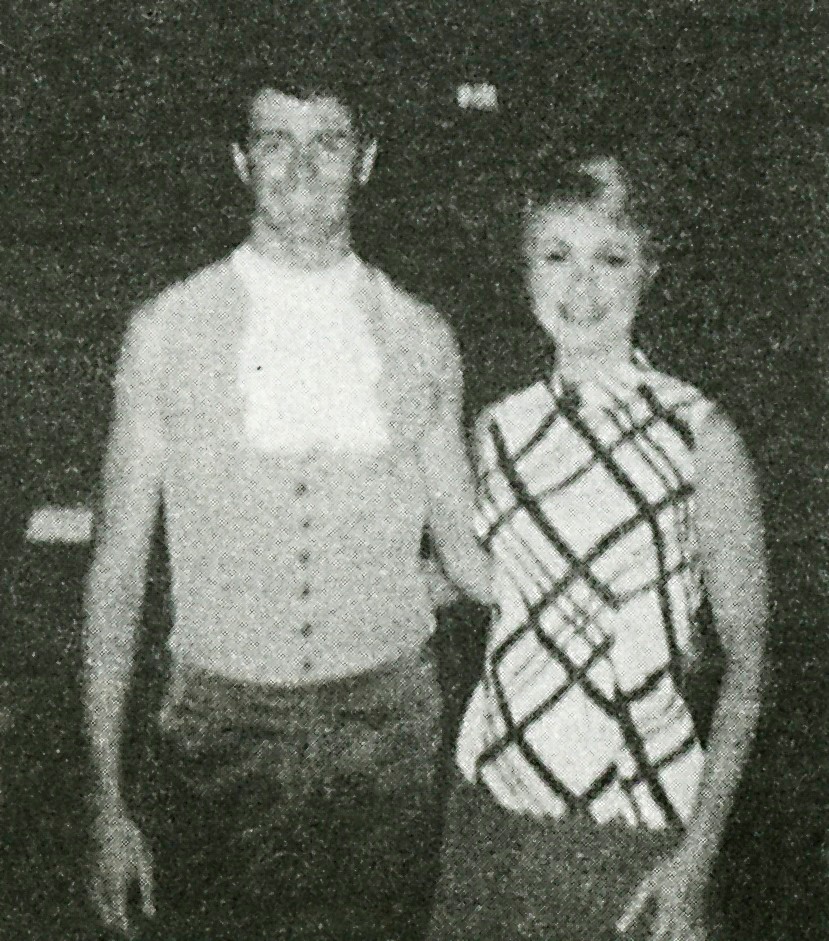
Richard Roberts and Shirley Jones

During the summer of his freshman year, he worked at the famous Starlight Theater in Kansas City, with a number of performers including Shirley Jones. He also had been working in a number of nightclubs and had been offered a contract to sing in Las Vegas.

While at the University of Kansas, Roberts fell ill and had to go to the hospital. When he returned home, he heard a voice telling him that he was in the wrong place and that he belonged at Oral Roberts University instead. The next year, Roberts left Kansas and enrolled at ORU. In 1968 Roberts dedicated his life to Jesus Christ and joined his father’s ministry as a singer.

Roberts holds three degrees from Oral Roberts University: BA in communications in 1985; a master's degree in 1992; and a DMin degree in 2002.

== Family ==
Against the wishes of his family and friends, Roberts married Patricia "Patti" Holcombe on November 27, 1968. In his book, He’s The God of a Second Chance, Roberts wrote that the marriage was "a terrible mistake that I didn't know how to get out of," but that he did not believe in divorce. Together they have two children, Christi (b. 1971) and Juli (b. 1972). Patti filed for divorce in 1978. In 1983, she released a book called Ashes to Gold, discussing her thoughts on Roberts' ministry and university.

Because of his high-profile divorce, Roberts believed it was important to go before the executive staff of the ministry and the university to discuss his desire to remarry and seek their approval. They approved his request. Several weeks later, on January 11, 1980, Roberts married Lindsay Salem at the campus chapel of Rollins College.

Together, Richard and Lindsay had four children. After several miscarriages, their first child, Richard Oral, (born on January 17, 1984) who, within hours, developed complications and died 36 hours after birth. Their other children are Jordan (b. 1985), Olivia (b. 1987) and Chloe (b. 1989). Roberts has 3 grandchildren.

== Career ==
=== Oral Roberts Evangelistic Association ===
At 19, Roberts joined his father's ministry and became immediately involved in several areas of the ministry including radio, television and traveling with his father on domestic and international crusades. His first trip was in December of the same year to Haiti singing with the music team, Oral Roberts Collegians. His first area of responsibility was reorganizing and developing the Collegians music group into the World Action Singers. Roberts and this group were featured in the new Sunday morning television program, taped in Los Angeles and prime-time television specials that were taped in different locations around the world.

Over the next decade Roberts sang on the television programs and produced more than 15 record albums.

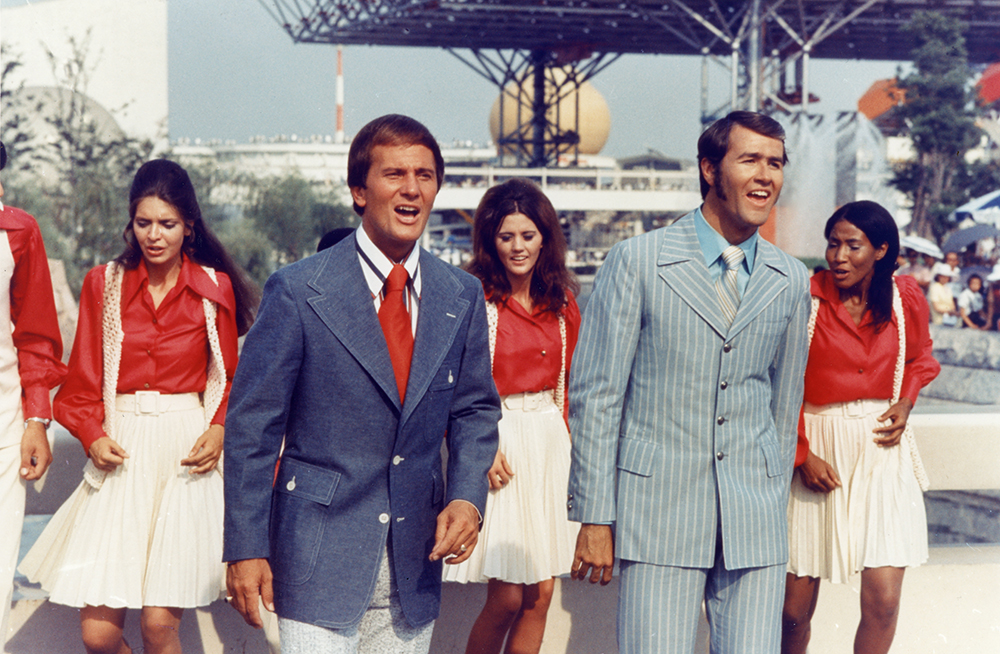
Pat Boone & Richard Roberts in Japan

When not involved in television production Roberts traveled the US and around the world performing in concerts and speaking at ministry sponsored events, as the ministry continued to raise funds to complete the building of the university. In addition, Roberts travelled and sang in numerous healing meetings with Kathryn Kuhlman from 1973-1975.

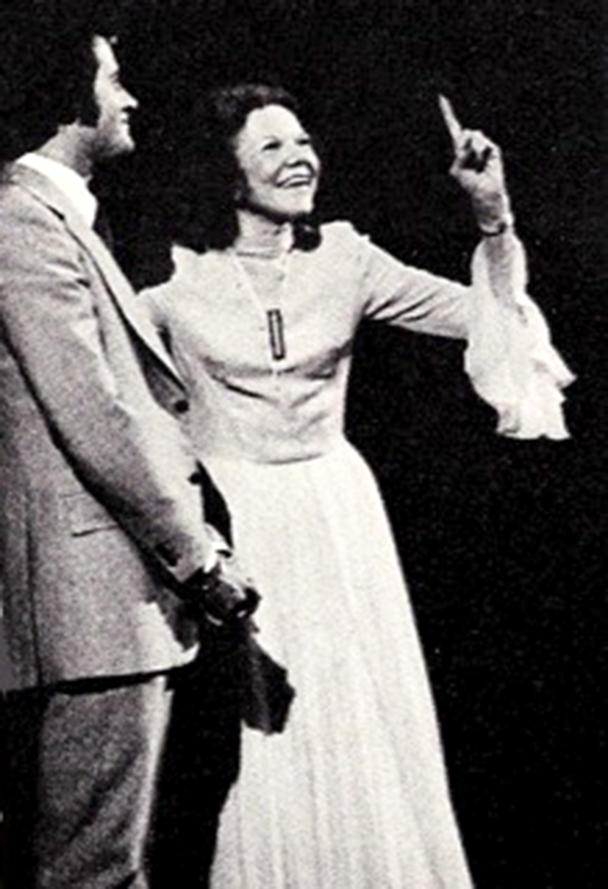
Richard Roberts & Kathryn Kuhlman

Roberts’ world fell apart after his wife, Patti, filed for divorce. In the book Expect a Miracle, Oral Roberts remembered his son coming to his office devastated, explaining what had just happened, asking what was to become of him and his work in the ministry. Oral noted that numerous individuals, including close friends and ministers, advised him to remove Richard from the Ministry, send him overseas for a number of years, and even disown him. After prayer, Oral believed that God was not through with Richard, and he was still to be involved in the ministry.

Roberts remarried and continued traveling, doing concerts, and singing on television. The concerts transformed into a combination of music, preaching and ministry events where Roberts prayed for people and people were testifying they had been healed. In 1982, Roberts held the first of many international crusades, starting with South Africa. According to the ministry website, oralroberts.com, Roberts has ministered in over 40 countries on six different continents including: Russia, India, Brazil, Australia, Niger, and Indonesia.

Roberts continued holding domestic meetings and ministering on television programs. In 1984, Roberts begins a live daily one-hour program called Richard Roberts Live that combined ministry, music, and special guests such as Richard Kiel, known for his role as Jaws in the James Bond movies, and Donna Douglas, best known as Elly May Clampett in the television show The Beverly Hillbillies.

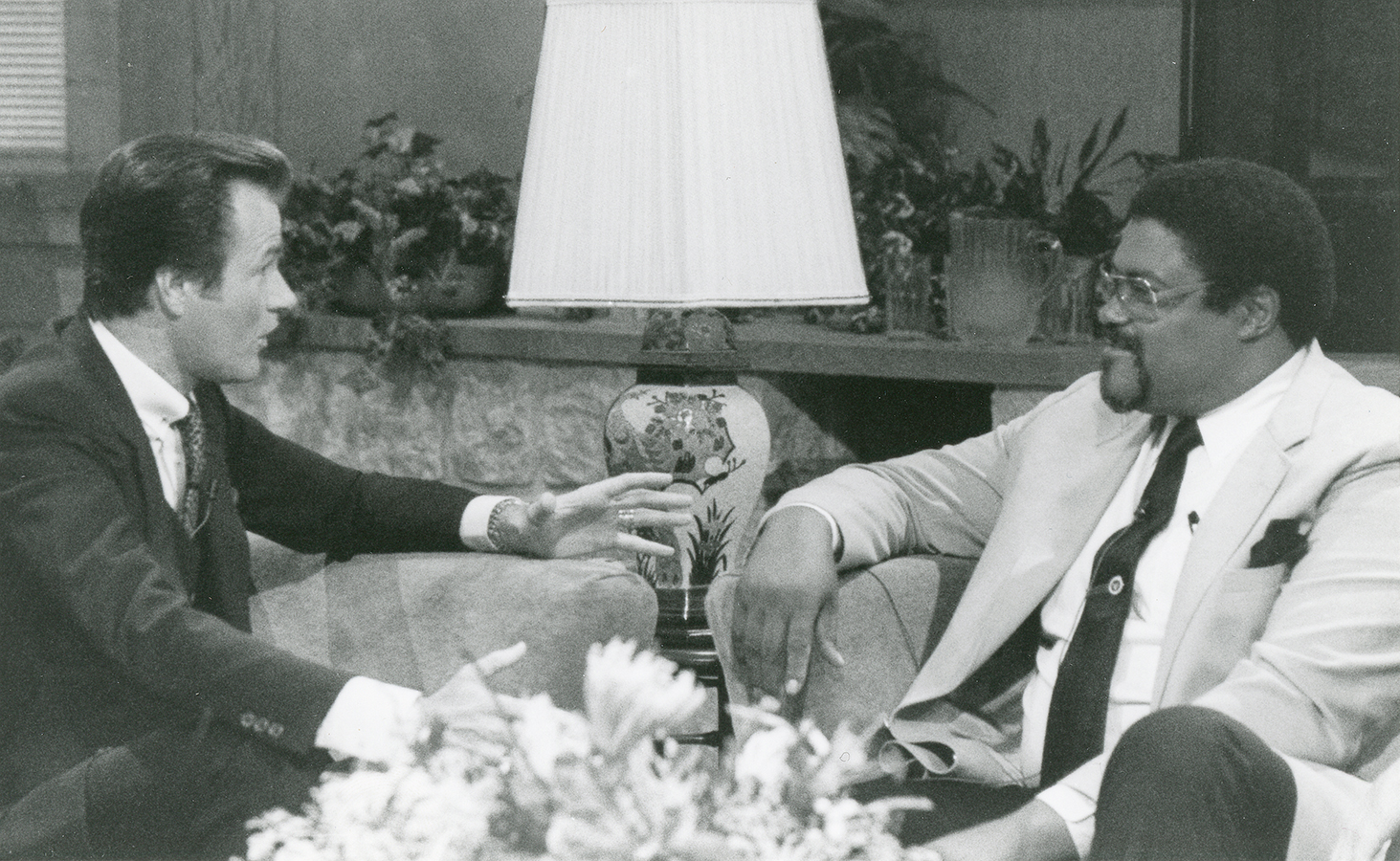
Richard Roberts (left) and Rosey Grier (Right)

In 1985, Oral Roberts stepped down, and Richard Roberts was elected president of Oral Roberts Evangelistic Association (OREA) by its board of directors. In 1986, Roberts worked with his father and helped found the International Charismatic Bible Ministries to support independent churches and ministries and help expand opportunities for student recruitment for ORU.

In 1987, Roberts was elected as the executive vice president of Oral Roberts University, and was involved in all areas of administration, presiding over the ORU chapel services. During the same time period, Roberts continued daily television, domestic crusades with his father, his own international crusades, and speaking at churches and conferences across the country. In 1992, Oral Roberts announced to the board that he was resigning as president of ORU.

=== Oral Roberts University ===
==== Serving dual roles ====
Commencement in 2002

On January 27, 1993, the board of regents elected Roberts as the second president of the university. Reports showed the university was in debt as much as $52 million, with tuition and fees not keeping up with expenses. Roberts assembled a team from his executive staff to work with him on resolving the financial problems.

==== Marketing the university for growth ====
Roberts pushed the team to increase enrollment, tighten budgets and find additional revenue streams. At the same time, he used his television program to promote the university. He started the Adopt A Student scholarship campaign as one of these efforts, and embarked on other efforts to promote Christian education and increase enrollment. Over the next four years, enrollment increased by 1,200 students and the university's debt shrank by 50 percent Roberts used his ministry connections to help with recruitment, specifically in the African American community. Through his speaking at churches and conferences, he was mainly responsible for the 20% African American student body. ORU received the Racial Harmony Award from the Council for Christian Colleges and Universities in 2002.

In 1993, Roberts made a number of changes in the athletic program, hiring Bill Self as head basketball coach, changed the school mascot from the Titans to the Golden Eagles, and hired Mike Carter as the new director of athletics.

As president of the university, Roberts began incorporating the university and students as part of the crusade/healing rally team, with students and staff from the School of Nursing and the School of Business joining doctors on outreach missions in West Africa.

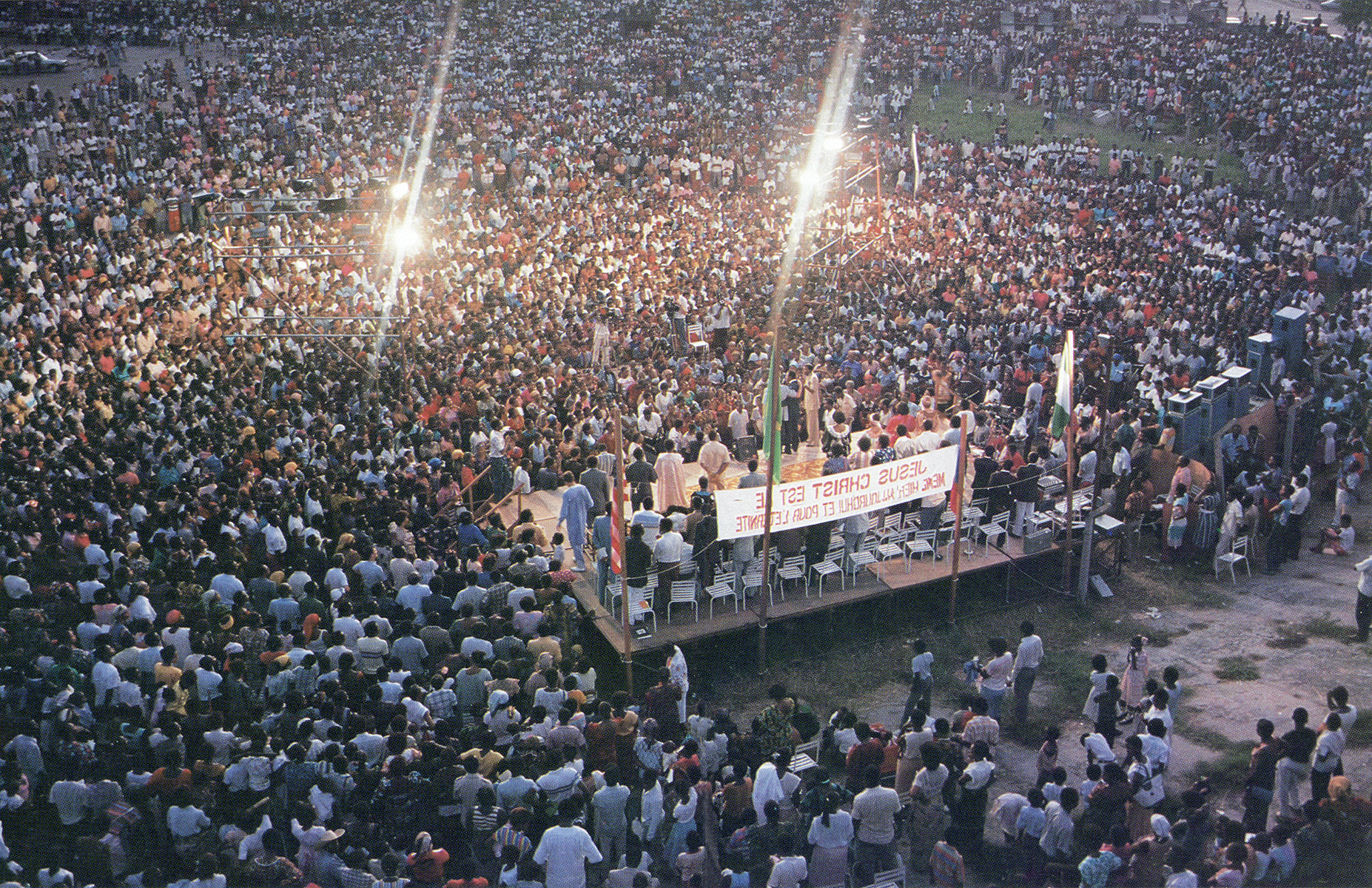
Richard Roberts in Kinshasa, 1987

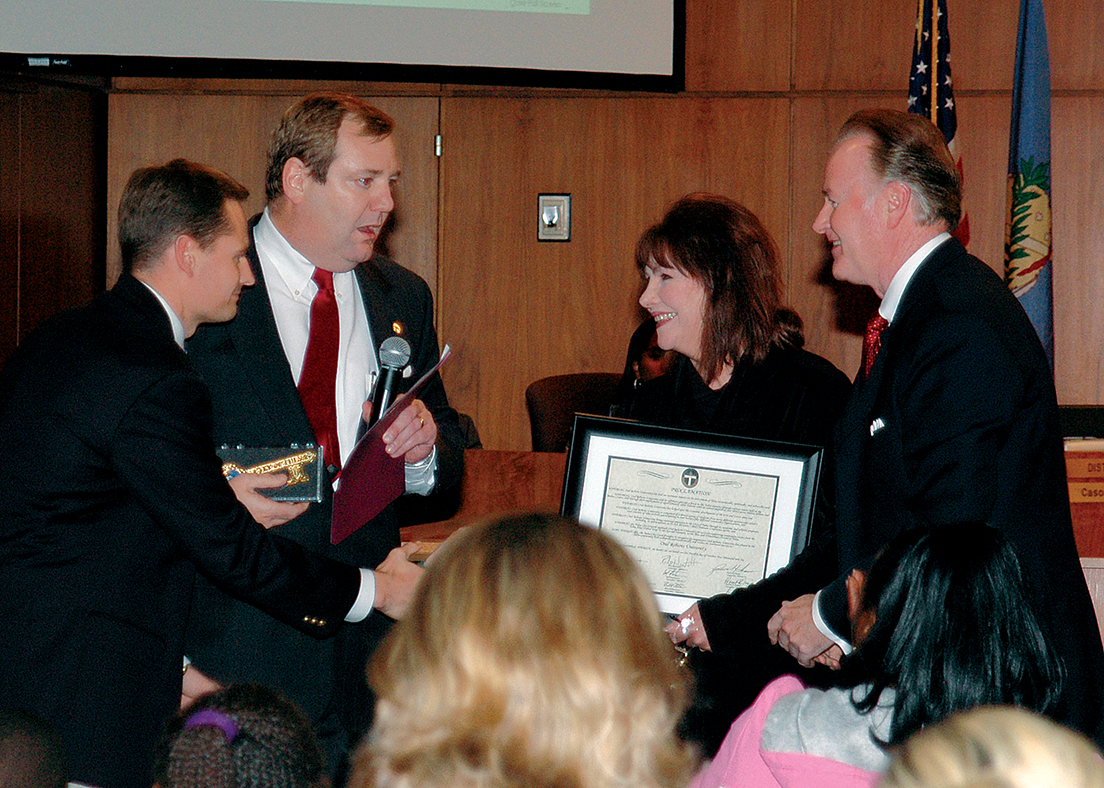
Richard Roberts accepts keys to the City in Tulsa, OK

==== Controversy ====
In October 2007, three former professors filed a lawsuit against Oral Roberts University and named the entire ORU Board of Regents, Oral Roberts Evangelistic Association, Roberts, his wife and several university administrators as co-defendants. As a part of the suit, additional allegations were made including: university resources were illegally used by Roberts to help a mayoral candidate's election campaign; Roberts misappropriated university funds for a daughter's trip to the Bahamas; was maintaining a stable of horses at university expense for the exclusive use of his children; used university staff to do his daughters' homework; remodeled his university-owned residence 11 times in 14 years; allowed the university to be billed for damage inflicted by his children to a university-owned golf cart; and personally acquired a Mercedes and a Lexus through ministry donations. Roberts responded by saying, "This lawsuit ...is about intimidation, blackmail and extortion."

A few days later, the suit was amended, alleging the university's financial comptroller had been fired; additionally amended stating "Witnesses have reported voluminous materials and documents were shredded and destroyed, constituting spoliation of evidence." One month later another wrongful termination lawsuit was filed against the university by a former ORU accountant, Trent Huddleston, who was employed for less than one year, claiming he had been ordered to help Roberts and his wife "cook the books" by misclassifying over $120,000 in funds, allegedly spent by the university on remodeling the university home that Roberts lived in.

==== Resignation ====
On October 17, 2007 Roberts asked for and was granted an indefinite leave of absence from the school by the university's board of regents, citing the "toll" the lawsuit and attendant allegations have taken on him and his family. In a statement Roberts said, "I don't know how long this leave of absence will last... I pray and believe that in God's timing, and when the Board feels that it is appropriate, I will be back at my post as President." Billy Joe Daugherty of Victory Christian Center was named executive regent of the board of regents and interim president. Chairman of the board of regents George Pearsons noted the temporary resignation was not an admission of guilt.

On November 13, the tenured faculty of Oral Roberts University approved a nonbinding vote of no confidence in Roberts. The vote was nearly unanimous according to a professor in attendance.

Roberts tendered his resignation to the university's board of regents on November 23, 2007, effective immediately. In an emailed statement he said, "I love ORU with all my heart. I love the students, faculty, staff and administration and I want to see God's best for all of them."

On January 14, 2008, the ORU Board of Regents voted unanimously to name Richard Roberts president emeritus in honor of his work during 15 years as president.

==== Resolution ====
The Huddleston lawsuit was dismissed, with ORU claiming Huddleston was nothing more than a disgruntled employee. Huddleston's attorney stated there would be an appeal, but this never came to pass.

In a written statement, the university denied "purposely or improperly" destroying documents. Upon review, it was discovered that the shredded documents had nothing to do with any allegations and were a part of normal policy, required by law for the privacy and protection of students and ministry donors.

By October 2008, the original three cases for wrongful discharge had been dismissed or settled.

No evidence regarding the additional allegations made against Roberts or the university was produced. No charges were filed and all other lawsuits were dismissed.

== Current ==
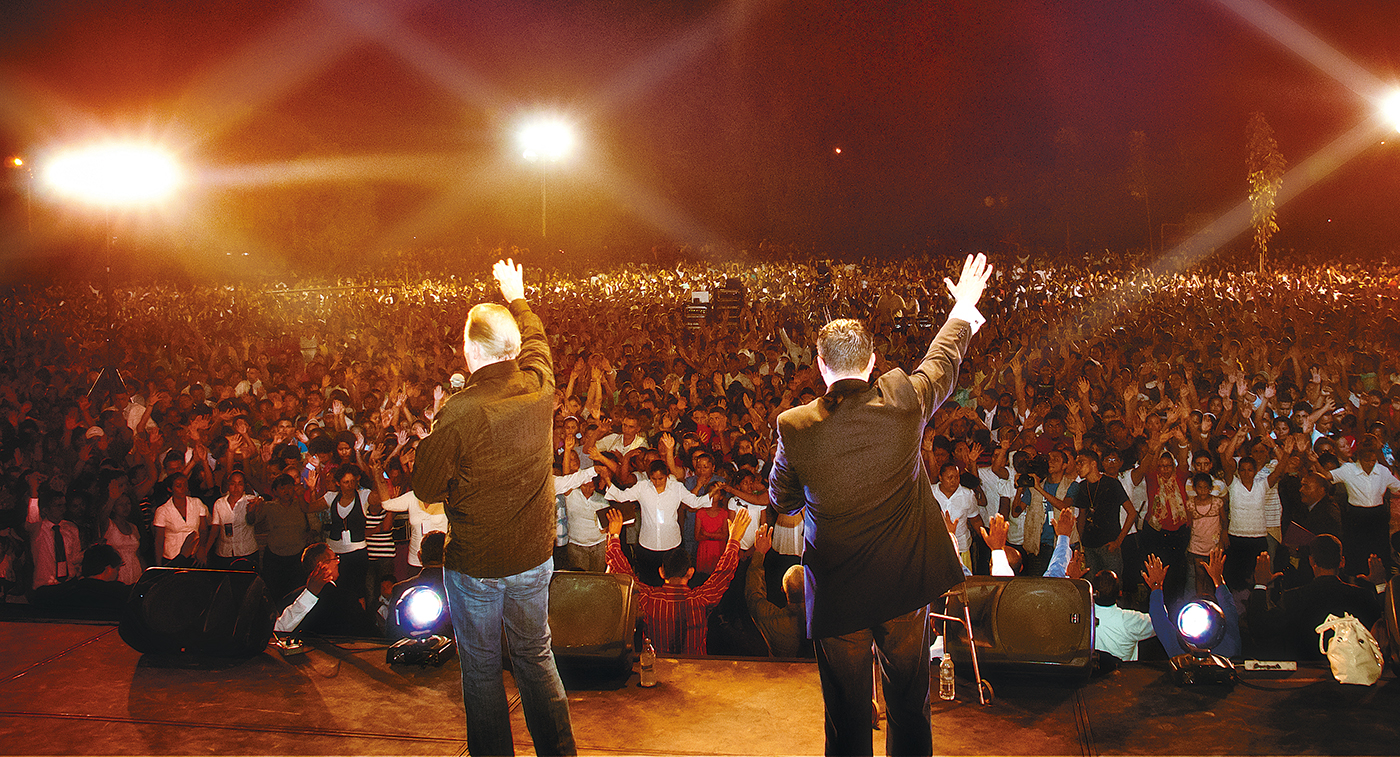
Richard Roberts Crusade - La Ceiba Honduras

After stepping down as ORU President, Roberts focused on what he calls his "first love", the healing ministry. Roberts moved the ministry from ORU.

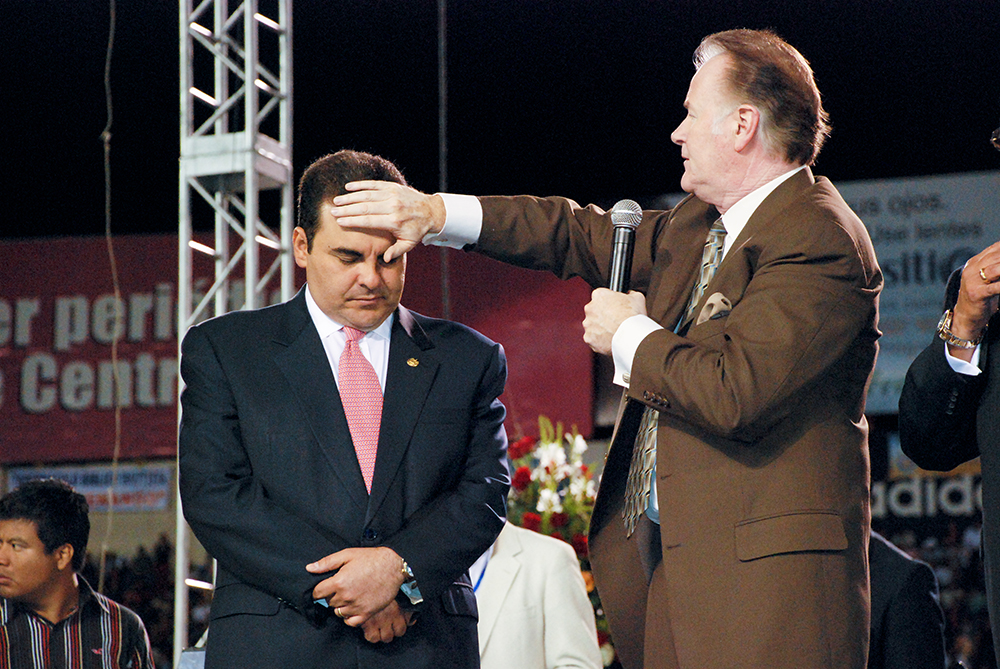
Richard Roberts praying for the President and the Nation of El Salvador

On January 24, 2012, the birthday of his deceased father, Roberts was stopped in Tulsa, Oklahoma on U.S. Route 169 going 93 mph in a 65-mph zone in his Mercedes S430. After failing two field sobriety tests, he was arrested on suspicion of driving under the influence and for driving more than 15 miles per hour over the speed limit. He agreed to take a breath test, which measured his blood alcohol content at .11, above the legal limit of .08. On January 30, 2012 Roberts was charged with two misdemeanor counts, including driving under the influence of alcohol. At a May 2012 hearing, Roberts pled guilty to a charge of driving under the influence of alcohol, speeding, receiving 18 months of probation and paying $1,532. He was also ordered to complete 56 hours of community service, undergo a drug and alcohol assessment, and attend DUI classes.

Roberts’ nightly television program continues. Roberts has additional crusades and medical outreaches in Honduras, Guatemala, Kenya, and Ghana. He has also sponsored the construction of a Christian school in Niger and worked with Pete Sumrall of Feed the Hungry. In 2010, Roberts opened the School of Miracles, a free online school.

== Bibliography ==
- A Study of the Impact of the Course, "Charismatic Life and the Healing Ministry," on Oral Roberts University Undergraduates. (D.Min, Oral Roberts University, 2002)(ProQuest document ID 305425748)
- Are Miracles Real? (Tulsa, Oral Roberts & Richard Roberts, Oral Roberts Evangelistic Assoc, 1996)
- Claim Your Inheritance (Tulsa, Oral Roberts Evangelistic Assoc., 2002) OCLC 49848142
- Faith to Try Again (Tulsa, Albury Publishing, 1982 )
- The Joy of the Lord - How to Get It and Keep It! (Tulsa, Oral Roberts Ministries, 1995)
- If You’re Going Through Hell, Don’t Stop (Tulsa, Oral Roberts Evangelistic Assoc., 1998) OCLC 40613311
- If You Catch Hell, Don’t Hold It (Tulsa, Oral Roberts Evangelistic Assoc., 1999) OCLC 45089986
- The Source, The Seed, The Answer: the Secrets of Seed-Faith (Tulsa, Oral Roberts Evangelistic Association, 1997)
- Excelling In Life (Tulsa, Oral Roberts Ministries, 1996)
- He's a Healing Jesus (Oral Roberts Ministries, 2010)
- He's the God of a Second Chance (Tulsa, Oral Roberts Evangelistic Association, 1985) OCLC 12415666
- The Unlimited Power Within You (Tulsa, Oral Roberts Ministries, 1999)
- The Good News Is the Bad News Is Wrong! (Tulsa, Oral Roberts Evangelistic Assoc., 1993) OCLC 55895413
- When It Seems All Hope is Gone (Tulsa, Harrison House Publishers, 2003)
- When All Hell Breaks Loose...Facing Your Fiery Trials With Faith (Tulsa, Oral Roberts Ministries, 2014)
