= Enrollment =

Enrollment (American spelling) or enrolment (British spelling) may refer to:

- Matriculation, the process of initiating attendance to a school
- The act of entering item into a roll or scroll.
- The total number of students properly registered and/or attending classes at a school (see List of largest universities by enrollment)
- Concurrent enrollment, the process in which high school students enroll at a university or college usually to attain college credit
- The participation of human subjects in a clinical trial
- Biometrics, the process of adding a user's credentials to the authentication system.
- The process of being entered onto an electoral roll
- Membership in a federally recognized American Indian tribe
- The defensive curling of a trilobite over its soft ventral organs.
- Volvation, the defensive curling of other arthropods such as pill bugs rolling themselves into a "pill".

Enrollment may also refer to:

- Enrolled bill, a legislative bill in the United States that has been enacted by a legislature

== See also ==
- Roll (disambiguation)
