= Oral Roberts =

American religious leader (1918–2009)

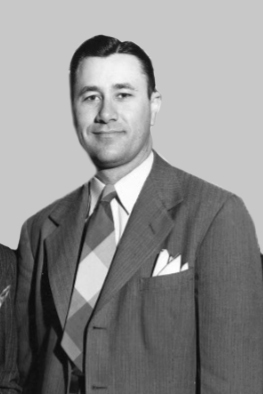
- Roberts in 1948
- Born: Granville Oral Roberts; January 24, 1918; Ada, Oklahoma, U.S.
- Died: December 15, 2009 (aged 91); Newport Beach, California, U.S.
- Occupation: Evangelist
- Years active: 1947–1993
- Spouse: Evelyn Lutman (m. 1938; died 2005)
- Children: 4, including Richard Roberts

Ecclesiastical career
- Church: Pentecostal (Pentecostal Holiness Church) 1936-1968, Methodist (United Methodist Church) 1968-1987, Charismatic 1987 onwards
- Offices held: Founder and President, Oral Roberts Evangelistic Association; Co-founder, President, and Chancellor, Oral Roberts University
- Website: www.oralroberts.com/oralroberts/

Granville Oral Roberts (January 24, 1918 – December 15, 2009) was an American Charismatic Christian televangelist, who was one of the first to propagate Prosperity Gospel Theology. He was ordained in the International Pentecostal Holiness Church from 1936 until his transfer to the United Methodist church in 1968, a controversial relationship that ended in 1987 when his credentials were revoked. He is considered one of the forerunners of the Charismatic movement, and at the height of his career was one of the most recognized preachers in the US. He founded the Oral Roberts Evangelistic Association and Oral Roberts University.

One of the most well-known and controversial American religious leaders of the 20th century, his preaching emphasized seed-faith. His ministries reached millions of followers worldwide spanning a period of over six decades. His healing ministry and his bringing American Charismatic movement into the mainstream had the most impact, but he also pioneered televangelism, and laid the foundations of the prosperity gospel and abundant life teachings. The breadth and style of his ministry, including his widely publicized funding appeals, made him a consistent subject of contention among critics and supporters.

== Early life ==
Roberts was born on January 24, 1918, in Pontotoc County, Oklahoma, the fifth and youngest child of the Reverend Ellis Melvin Roberts (1881–1967) and Claudius Priscilla Roberts (née Irwin) (1885–1974). In an interview on Larry King Live, Roberts claimed his mother was of Cherokee descent. Roberts also claimed Choctaw heritage. Roberts began life in poverty, and nearly died of tuberculosis when he was 17. After finishing high school, Roberts studied for two years each at Oklahoma Baptist University and Phillips University. In 1938, he married a preacher's daughter, Evelyn Lutman Fahnestock.

Roberts became a traveling faith healer after ending his college studies without a degree. According to a TIME Magazine profile of 1972, Roberts originally made a name for himself with a large mobile tent "that sat 3,000 on metal folding chairs".

== Ministry and university ==
In 1945, Roberts resigned from his pastorate in Shawnee, Oklahoma, to hold revivals in the area and attend Oklahoma Baptist. But in the late summer of 1945, while preaching in a North Carolina camp meeting, Roberts was asked by Robert E. "Daddy" Lee of Toccoa, Georgia, to consider becoming pastor of his small, eighty-member church. Roberts suggested they pray about it, and unexpectedly, decided to accept. By the end of the year, Roberts had resigned and moved back to Shawnee. Apparently, the Georgia conference of the International Pentecostal Holiness Church frowned on having a minister from outside its conference as a pastor. Short though it was, the Toccoa detour had a lasting effect on Roberts and his family. It was there that their daughter Rebecca, then five years old, first met her future husband, Marshall. There were also reportedly two instances of healing, which Roberts would later look back on as his first realization "that I was approaching 'my hour'."

Until 1947, Roberts struggled as a part-time preacher in Oklahoma, but when he was 29, Roberts said he picked up his Bible and it fell open at the Third Epistle of John, where he read verse 2: "I wish above all things that thou mayest prosper and be in health, even as thy soul prospereth." The next day, he said, he bought a Buick and God appeared, directing him to heal the sick.

Roberts resigned his pastoral ministry with the Pentecostal Holiness Church to found Oral Roberts Evangelistic Association (OREA). He conducted evangelistic and faith healing drives across the United States and around the world, claiming he could raise the dead. In November 1947, he started Healing Waters, a monthly magazine as a means to promote his meetings. Thousands of sick people waited in line to stand before Oral Roberts so he could pray for them. He appeared as a guest speaker for hundreds of national and international meetings and conventions. Through the years, he conducted more than 300 "crusades" on six continents, and personally laid hands in prayer on more than 2 million people.

In January 1955, Oral Roberts held a "salvation and healing" campaign in Johannesburg, South Africa. It was an era of apartheid. He was bitterly assailed by the Sunday Express for the hysteria and traffic jams of 20,000 people that packed big Wembley stadium and playing field. Other newspapers reported on the healings and 25,000 people saved. Roberts left behind a residual campaign fund in South Africa of $37,000 less expenses, with the hope that "his campaign will save 100,000 during the coming year". Three of the four sponsoring churches were Pentecostal, including Apostolic Faith Mission (AFM) and the Assemblies of God – White Group (AG). The campaign committee consisted entirely of white Afrikaner missionaries and ministers, H.R. Carter, D.D. Freeman, A.J. Schoeman (head of AFM), and W.F. Mullan (head of AG). The campaign committee had plans to use the Oral Roberts' 100,000 Souls for Africa Campaign residual fund to hold revivals in 1955 to win souls for Christ, both Afrikaners (white) and Africans (black). The campaign committee sponsored a young evangelist from the U.S.A. Emanuele Cannistraci, and paid for his revivals in Johannesburg at the Fairview Assemblies Hall and a portion of Bethshan Tabernacle's costs for Cannistraci's revival in Durban, South Africa, a congregation of mixed race. Cannistraci's photos, including his claims of healing two deaf and dumb brothers during the revival, were published in Oral Roberts' America's Healing Magazine.

He also ran direct mail campaigns of seed-faith, which appealed to poor Americans, often from ethnic minorities. At its peak in the early 1980s, Roberts was the leader of a $120 million-a-year organization employing 2,300 people. This included not only a university but also a medical school and hospital as well as buildings on 50 acres (200,000 m^{2}) south of Tulsa valued at $500 million. Another part of the Oral Roberts Evangelistic Association, the Abundant Life Prayer Group (ALPG), was founded in 1958.

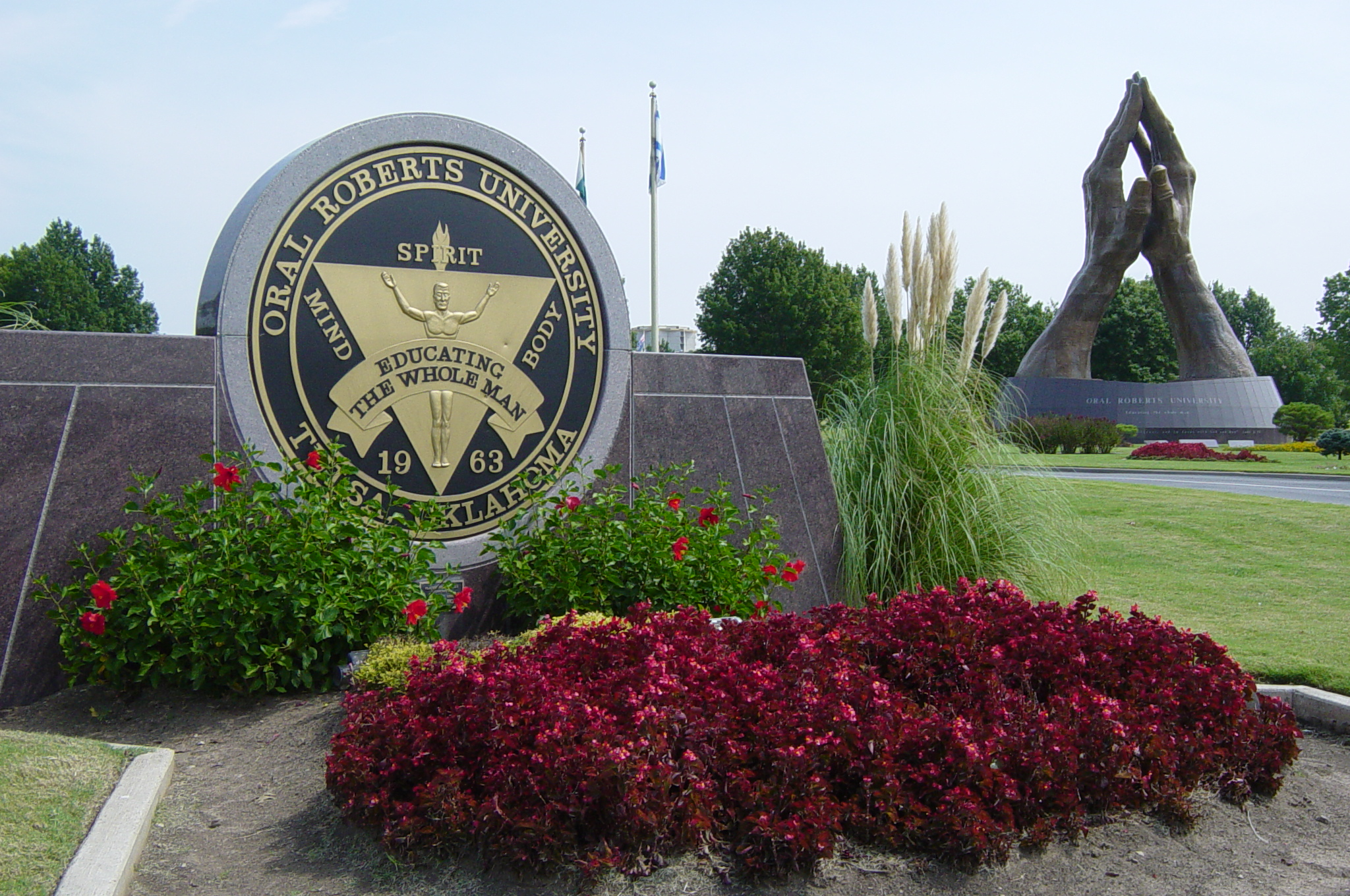
The Praying Hands, on the ORU campus in Tulsa, Oklahoma

In 1963, he founded Oral Roberts University (ORU) in Tulsa, Oklahoma, stating he was obeying a command from God. The university was chartered during 1963 and received its first students in 1965. Students were required to sign an honor code pledging not to drink, smoke, or engage in premarital sexual activities. The Prayer Tower, opened in 1967, is located at the center of the campus.

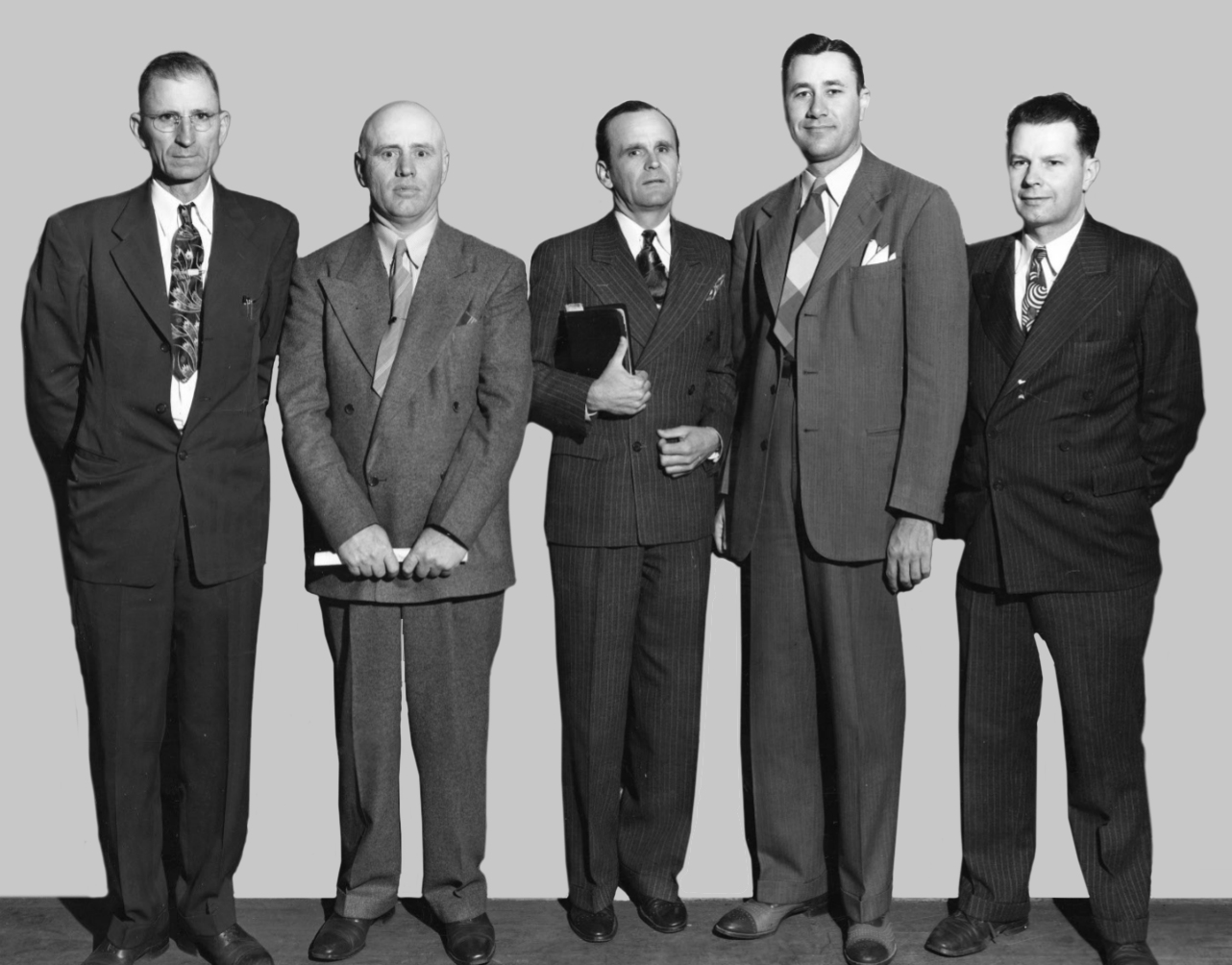
From left: Young Brown, Jack Moore, William Branham, Oral Roberts, Gordon Lindsay; photo taken at Kansas City in 1948

Roberts was a pioneer televangelist, and attracted a vast viewership. He began broadcasting by radio in 1947, and began broadcasting his revivals by television in 1954. His television ministry continued with The Abundant Life program reaching 80% of the United States by 1957, and quarterly Prime Time Specials from 1969 through 1980. In 1996, he founded Golden Eagle Broadcasting.

On March 17, 1968, Roberts and his wife were received as members of the Boston Avenue United Methodist Church in Tulsa, Oklahoma, by Dr. Finis Crutchfield, its then pastor. The United Methodist Church offered more leniency in doctrinal and moral issues than the Pentecostal Holiness Church had. This granted Roberts some leeway, as it was expected that the strictness of the Pentecostal tradition may have impeded his rise in popularity. Before Roberts' switch to Methodism, Crutchfield arranged a meeting between Roberts and Bishop William Angie Smith, at which the Bishop told Roberts, "We need you, but we need the Holy Spirit more than we need you and we've got to have the Holy Spirit in the Methodist Church." Roberts became an elder in the Oklahoma Conference of the United Methodist Church. From 1968 through 1987, Roberts was a member of the United Methodist Church's ministry.

Roberts affected the American Protestant community. According to one commentator, his ministry's influence in conservative Protestant culture was second only to that of Billy Graham. His divine healing ministry called for prayer to heal the whole person—body, mind and spirit. Many labeled him a faith healer, but he rejected this with the comment: "God heals—I don't." He played a major role in bringing American Pentecostal Christianity into the mainstream. Even though Roberts was often associated with the prosperity gospel and the faith movement because of his close doctrinal and personal ties with Word-Faith teachers, his abundant life teachings did not fully identify him with that movement.

In 1977, Roberts claimed to have had a vision from a 900-foot-tall Jesus who told him to build City of Faith Medical and Research Center, and the hospital would be a success. In 1980, Roberts said he had a vision that encouraged him to continue the construction of his City of Faith Medical and Research Center in Oklahoma, which opened in 1981. At the time, it was among the largest health facilities of its kind in the world and was intended to merge prayer and medicine in the healing process. The City of Faith operated for eight years before closing in late 1989. The Orthopedic Hospital of Oklahoma still operates on its premises. In 1983 Roberts said Jesus had appeared to him in person and commissioned him to find a cure for cancer.

Roberts' fundraising was controversial. In January 1987, during a fundraising drive, Roberts announced to a television audience that unless he raised $8 million by that March, God would "call him home." However, the year before on Easter he had told a gathering at the Dallas Convention Center that God had instructed him to raise the money "by the end of the year" or he would die. Regardless of this new March deadline and the fact that he was still $4.5 million short of his goal, some were fearful that he was referring to suicide, given the impassioned pleas and tears that accompanied his statement. Late in March 1987, while Roberts was fasting and praying in the Prayer Tower, Florida, dog track owner Jerry Collins donated $1.3 million. Highly worried by what he perceived as Roberts threatening to starve himself, Collins said, "I did it in order to save the guy from going to heaven in a hurry. It's got nothing to do with religion. I've been a Baptist and a Methodist. I believe in religion and not just the church. You have to help one another." Altogether, Roberts raised a total of $9.1 million. Later that year, he announced that God had raised the dead through his ministry. Some of Roberts' fundraising letters were written by Gene Ewing, who headed a business writing donation letters for other evangelicals such as Don Stewart and Robert Tilton.

Roberts maintained his love of finery; one obituary claimed that even when times became economically hard, "he continued to wear his Italian silk suits, diamond rings and gold bracelets—airbrushed out by his staff on publicity pictures".

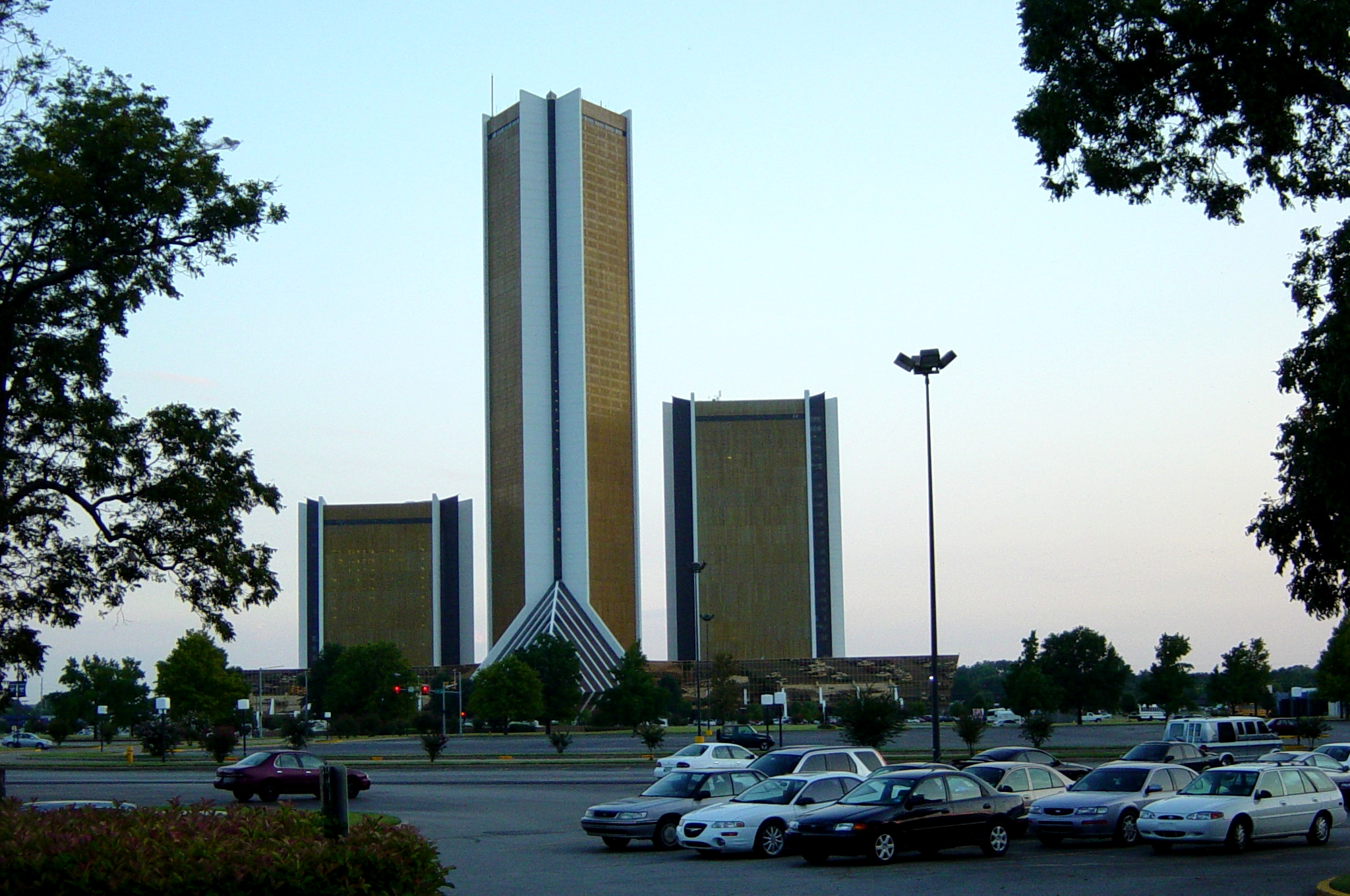
The CityPlex office complex, originally built as Oral Roberts' City of Faith Medical and Research Center in Tulsa

He stirred up controversy when Time reported in 1987 that his son Richard Roberts claimed that he had seen his father raise a child from the dead. That year, the Bloom County comic strip recast its character Bill the Cat as a satirized televangelist, "Fundamentally Oral Bill". In 1987, Time stated that he was "re-emphasizing faith healing and [is] reaching for his old-time constituency." However, the income of his organization continued to decrease (from $88 million in 1980 to $55 million in 1986, according to the Tulsa Tribune) and his largely vacant City of Faith Medical Center continued to lose money.

Harry McNevin said that in 1988 the ORU Board of Regents "rubber-stamped" the "use of millions in endowment money to buy a Beverly Hills property so that Oral Roberts could have a West Coast office and house." In addition, he said a country club membership was purchased for the Roberts' home. The lavish expenses led to McNevin's resignation from the Board. In 1988, Oral Roberts and his son Richard were sued for $15 million in federal court by patients at City of Faith Medical Center, who claimed the two were frauds who did not visit or heal patients in the hospital.

His organizations were also affected by scandals involving other televangelists and the City of Faith hospital was forced to close in 1989 after losing money. Roberts was forced to respond with the sale of his holiday homes in Palm Springs and Beverly Hills as well as three of his Mercedes cars.

Richard Roberts resigned from the presidency of ORU on November 23, 2007, after being named as a defendant in a lawsuit alleging improper use of university funds for political and personal purposes, and improper use of university resources. The university was given a donation of $8 million by Hobby Lobby heir Mart Green, and although the lawsuit was still in process, the school submitted to an outside audit, and with a good report an additional $62 million was given by Green. Oral Roberts continued in his role as ORU chancellor, helping in the leadership of ORU along with Billy Joe Daugherty, who was named as the executive regent to assume administrative responsibilities of the Office of the President by the ORU Board of Regents. Oral Roberts continued as the ORU chancellor until his death, but in 2009, eleven months before his death, he handed over the leadership of ORU to its incoming president, Mark Rutland.

The Oklahoma Senate adopted a resolution honoring the life of Oral Roberts, and he accepted this honor in 2009 at the age of 91, seven months before his death. The Oklahoma Association of Broadcasters (OAB) elected Roberts to the OAB Hall of Fame one month before his death.

== Personal life ==
Roberts was married to Evelyn Lutman Fahnestock (1917–2005) for 66 years from December 25, 1938, until her death from a fall, at the age of 88, on May 4, 2005. Their daughter Rebecca Nash died with her husband, businessman Marshall Nash, in an airplane crash on February 11, 1977. Their elder son, Ronald Roberts, died by suicide on June 10, 1982, five months after receiving a court order to undergo counseling at a drug treatment center. The other two Roberts' children are son Richard, an evangelist and former president of Oral Roberts University, and daughter Roberta Potts, an attorney.

Roberts died of complications from pneumonia on December 15, 2009, at the age of 91. He had been "semi-retired" and living in Newport Beach, California. He was interred next to his wife at the Memorial Park Cemetery in Tulsa, Oklahoma (the same cemetery where T. L. Osborn would be interred nearly four years later).

According to a 1987 article in The New York Review of Books by Martin Gardner, the "most accurate and best documented biography" is Oral Roberts: An American Life, an objective study by David Edwin Harrell Jr., a historian at Auburn University.

== See also ==
- Healing revival
- List of television evangelists
- MC 900 Ft. Jesus, a Dallas area rapper whose stage name was inspired by Roberts' 1977 vision.
