= Prayer Tower =

Tower on the campus of Oral Roberts University in Tulsa, Oklahoma

Coordinates: 36.05056°N 95.95245°W

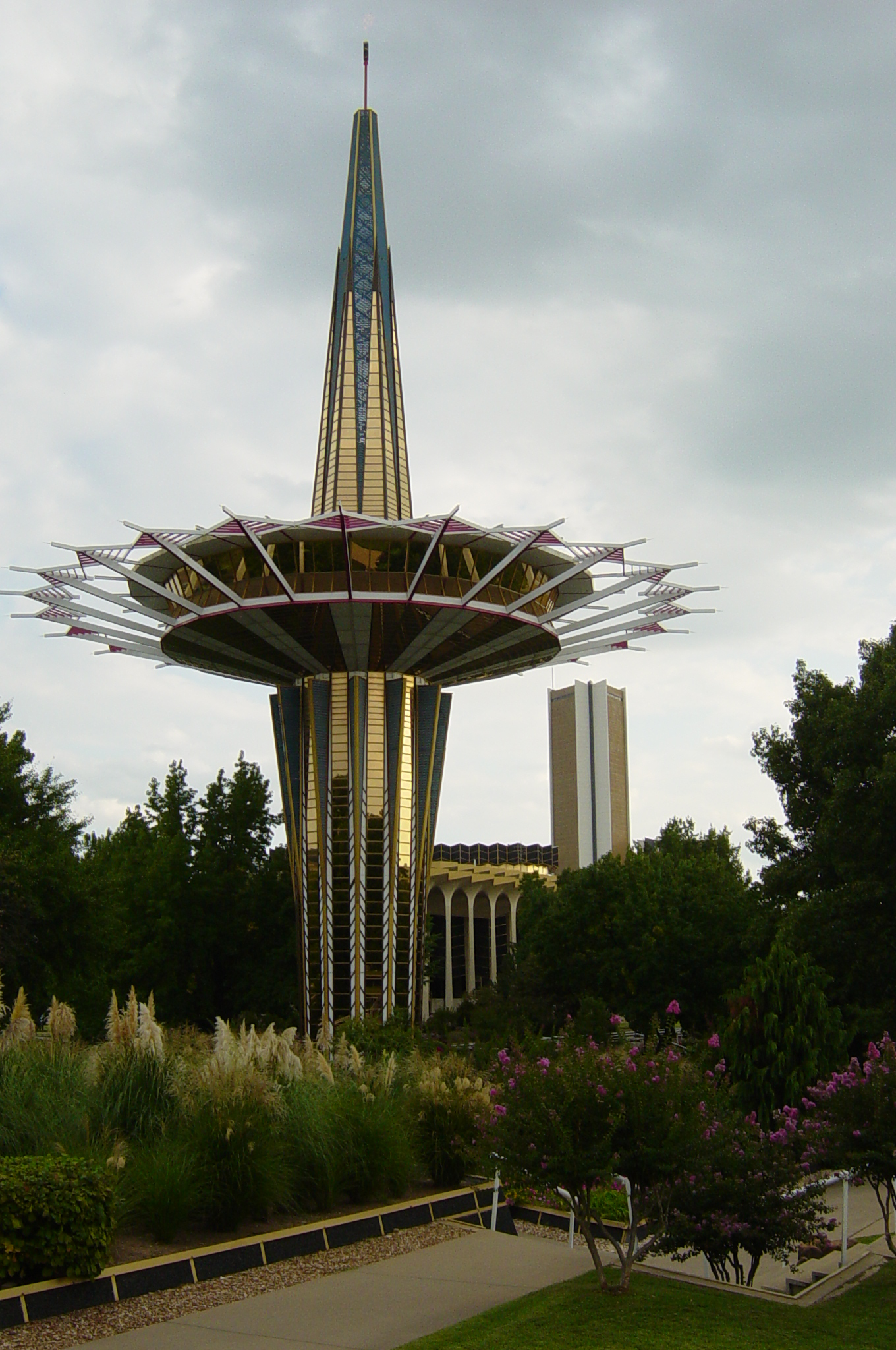
The Prayer Tower on the campus of Oral Roberts University (the gas flame at its peak is visible in this photograph)

The Prayer Tower is a late Googie design-influenced tower located on the campus of Oral Roberts University in Tulsa, Oklahoma. The 200 ft (60.9 m) glass and steel structure, designed by Tulsa architect Frank Wallace, opened in 1967. An enclosed observation deck gives a 360° view of the surrounding area and enables a self-guided visual tour of the ORU campus. The landscaped Ralph L. Reece Memorial Gardens surround the tower base. The tower is a popular local tourist attraction.

== Symbolism ==
ORU is a charismatic Christian university. According to school publicity the tower's form is laden with Christian symbolism. The Prayer Tower is located at the center of campus to symbolize prayer's central role in the goals of the university. The disc and spindle design takes on the look of a cross from any horizontal bearing, and from the air resembles the Star of David. The tower's "upward spiral" is intended to mirror one's relationship with God. The latticework which surrounds the observation deck is reportedly built in part from standard white PVC pipe (with the original specification markings still somewhat visible) and is meant as a semi-literal representation of the crown of thorns worn by Jesus on the cross, with red coloring for the blood Christ shed in death. The tower's peak features an eternal flame representing Baptism of the Holy Spirit.

== See also ==
- Oral Roberts University
- Oral Roberts
- Jesus Calls Prayer Tower
- Christian Broadcasting Network
- Richard Roberts
- Pat Robertson
