= Multnomah University =

Private non-denominational Christian university in Portland, Oregon

- Former names: Multnomah School of the Bible (1936–1993); Multnomah Bible College (1993–2008)
- Type: Private university
- Active: February 14, 1936–May 1, 2024
- Endowment: $8.74M (2021)
- President: Jessica Taylor
- Undergraduates: 335
- Postgraduates: 175
- Location: Portland, Oregon, United States; 45.5265°N 122.5766°W
- Campus: 25 acres (10 ha)
- Nickname: Lions
- Sporting affiliations: NAIA – CCC
- Website: multnomah.edu

Multnomah University (MU) was a private Christian university in Portland, Oregon, United States. It provided undergraduate, graduate, and certificate programs in both in-person and online settings. In 2023, the school announced it would be closing as Multnomah University on May 1, 2024, becoming the Multnomah campus of Jessup University.

== History ==
On February 14, 1936, John G. Mitchell called a meeting of Portland-area ministers and Christian businessmen to discuss the idea of creating a Bible school in the Pacific Northwest. Mitchell, working with B.B. Sutcliffe, Willard Aldrich, and others, founded the Multnomah School of the Bible that year.

In the following October, classes began with 49 students and a half-dozen faculty in a former mortuary.

B.B. Sutcliffe served as the first president from 1936 to 1939. Later, in 1943, Willard Aldrich became the president of the school. At 34, Aldrich was the youngest president of any college in the United States. Aldrich served as the president until his retirement in 1978. During his time as president, Multnomah became a degree-granting college; it also came to reside on what would remain its main campus until its closing in 2024. Aldrich's son, Joseph C. Aldrich, followed in his father's footsteps and became the next president of Multnomah.

The Multnomah Graduate School of Ministry was founded as a related institution in 1986 and was renamed later to Multnomah Biblical Seminary. In 1993, the college was renamed Multnomah Bible College. On July 1, 2008, the name of the institution was changed to Multnomah University.

In 2016, Multnomah University was granted an exception to Title IX that allowed it to legally discriminate against LGBT students. University policy stated that humans should have sex only within heterosexual marriage.

=== Closure ===
According to United States Federal data for college enrollment, Multnomah's numbers had been declining since 2013. In the 2010s, enrollment was steady and between 900 and 1000 students, but in 2013, it had declined to 777 enrolled students. By fall of 2021, enrollment had decreased to 595. On November 7, 2023, the university announced it would be closing as an independent institution to become the Multnomah Campus of Jessup University. In opposition to Multnomah's enrollment decline, Jessup University in the fall of 2021 had 1,685 students and showed growth for the previous 10 years.

With its closure on May 1, 2024, students enrolled at that time were offered the option to participate in one of several teach-out programs through other universities. Those who choose that option were allowed to complete degrees with a deadline date of April 30, 2027. Teach-out program graduates will receive a diploma and transcript from Multnomah University.

== Campus locations ==
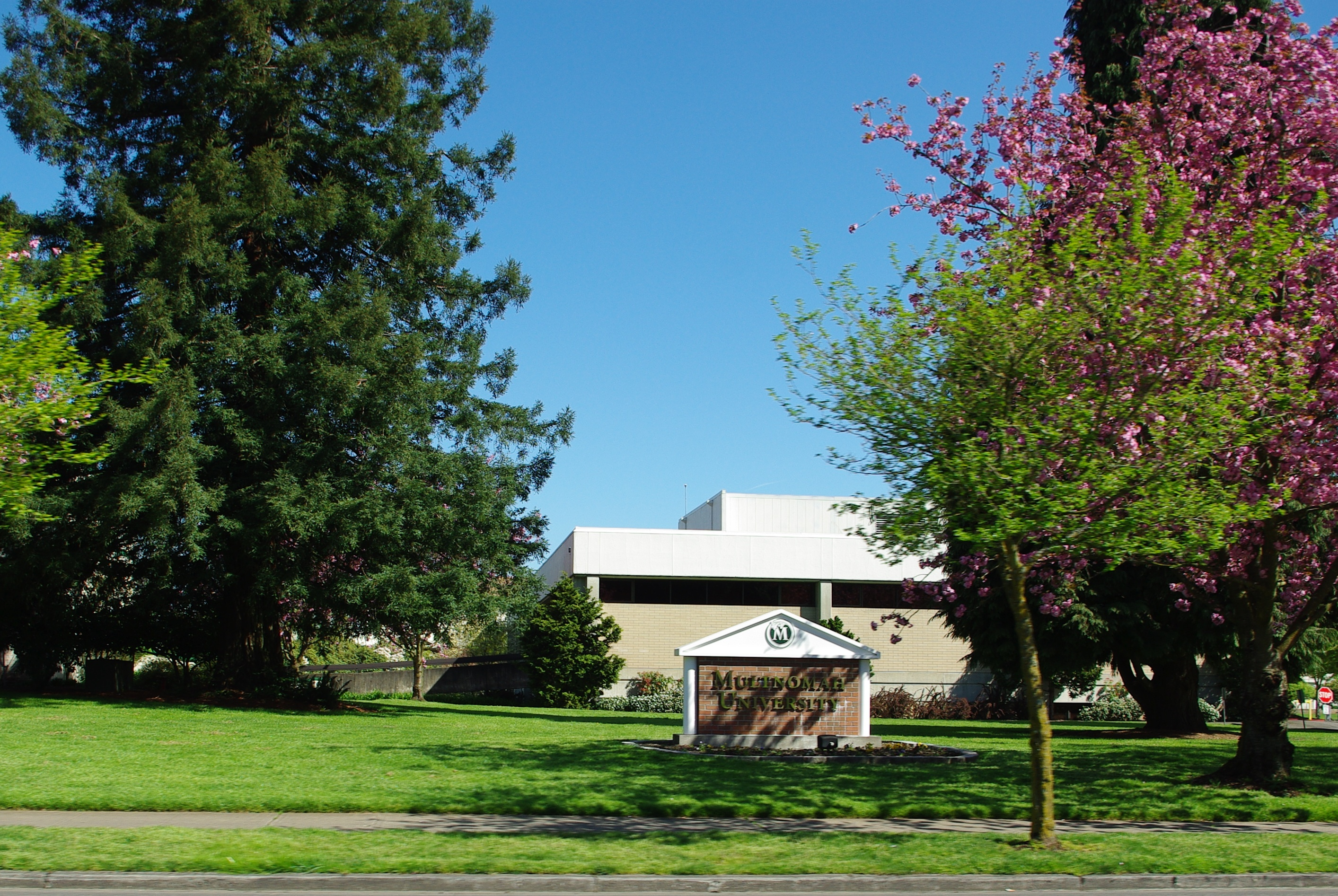
Northeast Portland campus

The original campus was located adjacent to the site of the present Lloyd Center shopping mall in Northeast Portland. In 1952, the school purchased the 17-acre (69,000 m²) former campus of the Oregon Blind Trades School, a branch of the Oregon State School for the Blind, located at NE 82nd Avenue and NE Glisan Street, where the campus remains today.

In 2008, Multnomah announced a satellite campus in Reno, Nevada. Reno students could choose from a bachelor's degree in biblical and theological studies or graduate degrees in biblical and theological studies or church leadership. Multnomah's Reno campus was also home to Reno Technology Academy, which exists to resolve the information technology labor shortage in Northern Nevada by providing industry certifications. The Reno campus closed at the end of 2020.

== Ministries ==
Over its history, Multnomah was the starting point of several independent ministries and businesses, including Mission Portland, International Renewal Ministries, and Multnomah Press (now Waterbrook-Multnomah Publishing Group, which no longer maintained any connection to Multnomah University at the time of the university's closing).

== Academics ==
Multnomah offered bachelor's, master's, and doctoral degrees, as well as professional certifications and endorsements. It was accredited by the Northwest Commission on Colleges and Universities and the Association of Theological Schools.

=== Undergraduate programs ===
Historically, Multnomah University required all undergraduate students to major in Bible and Theology and choose a second major after that. Later, the required major in Bible and Theology was dropped in favor of a less robust "Biblical Core."

MU's Summit program allowed students to earn a Bachelor of Arts (BA) in Bible and Theology and a Master of Divinity (M.Div.) in just five years instead of seven. The university also offered two TESOL certificate options for people wanting to teach English to speakers of other languages.

=== Graduate programs ===
Multnomah offered several Master of Arts (MA) programs. There was also an online version of the Master of Arts in Global Development and Justice degree that began with two weeks of classes in Rwanda or Thailand before transitioning to fully online classes. Still more, there was also an online version of the MA in TESOL.

==== Seminary ====
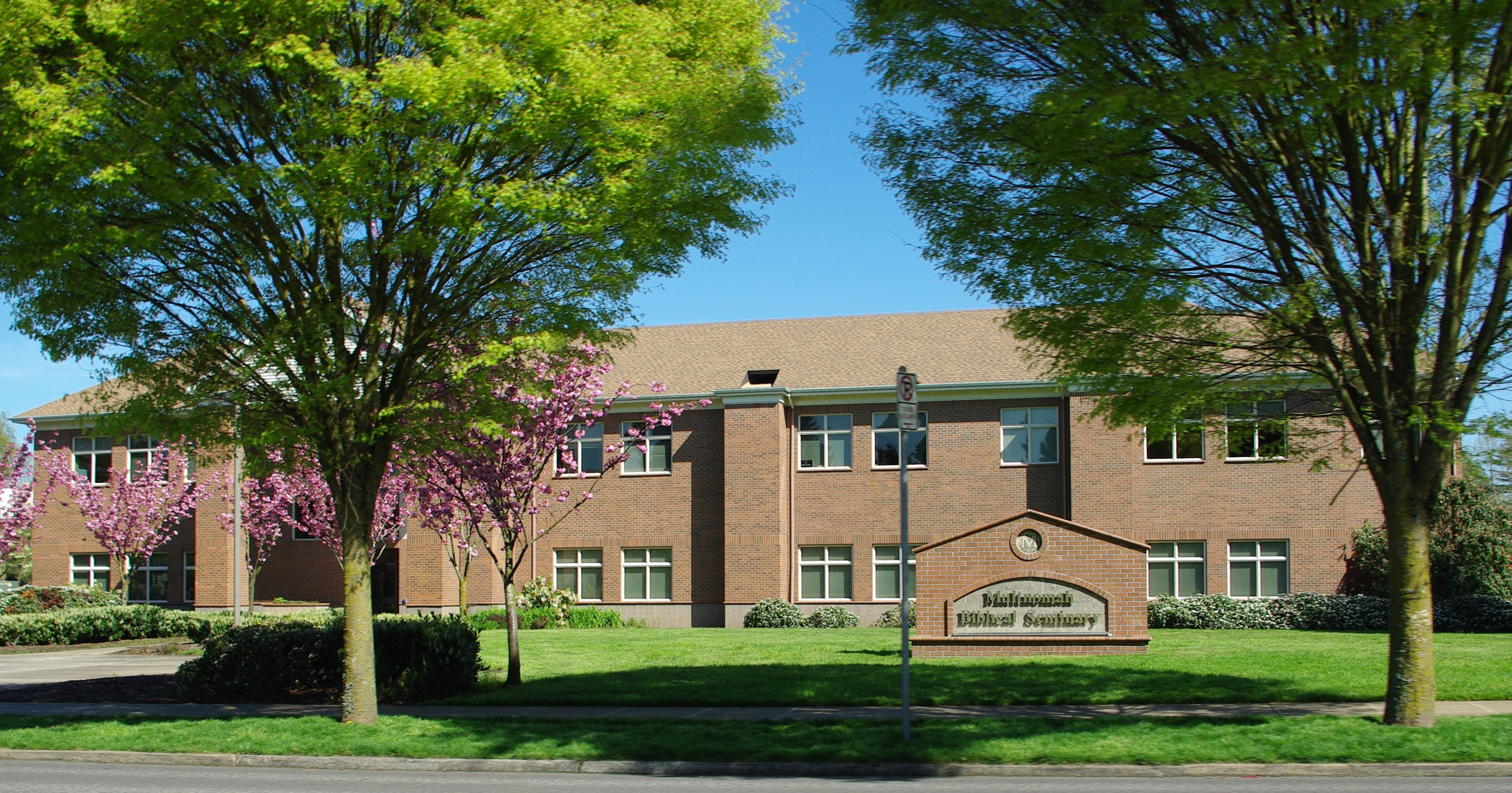
Multnomah Biblical Seminary

The Multnomah Biblical Seminary offered both master's and doctoral degrees in fields such as applied theology, biblical studies, Christian leadership, theological studies, and divinity. The Doctor of Ministry (D.Min.), in particular, offered several specialized tracks, including Cross-Cultural Engagement, Contextual Leadership, Global Evangelism, and Youth Ministry.

Students at the seminary were offered a standard track (for those without a formal theology education) and an advanced track (for those with a formal theology education) that eliminated one year of graduate studies.

== Athletics ==
The Multnomah athletic teams were called the Lions. The university was a member of the National Association of Intercollegiate Athletics (NAIA), primarily competing in the Cascade Collegiate Conference (CCC) from the 2015–16 academic year until its closing.

Multnomah competed in 12 intercollegiate varsity sports. Men's sports included basketball, cross country, golf, lacrosse, soccer, and track and field; women's sports included basketball, cross country, lacrosse, soccer, track and field, and volleyball.

The men's basketball team holds the NAIA record for three-pointers taken in a game (79) and three-pointers made in a game (29).

== Notable people ==
=== Alumni ===
- Ferdinand Waldo Demara, subject of the movie The Great Impostor
- Bettie Page, American model
- Dan Kimball, pastor, author
- Luis Palau, evangelist, author
- Linda Chaikin, author of Christian fiction

=== Faculty ===
- Bruce Wilkinson, author of The Prayer of Jabez, founder of Walk Thru the Bible
