= Prosperity theology =

Material wealth-based Protestant belief

Prosperity theology (sometimes referred to as the prosperity gospel, the health and wealth gospel, the gospel of success, seed-faith gospel, Faith movement, or Word of Faith movement) is a belief among some Charismatic Protestants, originating in the United States, that financial blessing and physical well-being are always the will of God for them, and that faith, positive scriptural confession, and giving to charitable and religious causes will increase one's material wealth. Material and especially financial success is seen as evidence of divine grace or favor and blessings, while the opposite (poverty) is seen as divine judgment.

Prosperity theology is considered heretical by almost all other Christian denominations; it has been criticized by leaders from various Christian denominations, who maintain that it is irresponsible, promotes idolatry, and is contrary to the Bible. Secular as well as Christian observers have also criticized some versions of the prosperity theology as exploitative of the poor. The practices of some preachers have attracted scandal, and some have been charged with financial fraud.

Prosperity theology views the Bible as a contract covenant between God and humans: if humans have faith in God, God will deliver security and prosperity. The doctrine emphasizes the importance of personal empowerment, proposing that God's will is for people to be blessed. Atonement in Christianity (reconciliation with God) is interpreted to include the alleviation of sickness and poverty, which are viewed as curses to be broken by grace and faith.

It was during the Healing Revivals of the 1950s that prosperity theology first came to prominence in the United States.

Some commentators have linked the origins of its theology to the New Thought movement, which began in the 19th century. The prosperity teaching later figured prominently in the Word of Faith movement and 1980s televangelism. In the 1990s and 2000s, it was adopted by influential leaders in the charismatic movement in the United States, and has since spread worldwide. Prominent leaders in the development of prosperity theology include David Oyedepo, Todd White, Michael Pitts, Benny Hinn, E. W. Kenyon, Oral Roberts, A. A. Allen, Robert Tilton, T. L. Osborn, Joel Osteen, Creflo Dollar, Kenneth Copeland, Reverend Ike, Kenneth Hagin, Joyce Meyer, and Jesse Duplantis.

== History ==
=== Late 19th and early 20th-century background ===
External videos
- Interview with Kate Bowler on Blessed: A History of the American Prosperity Gospel, March 18, 2014, C-SPAN

According to historian Kate Bowler, the prosperity gospel was formed from the intersection of three different ideologies: Charismatic, New Thought, and "an American gospel of pragmatism, individualism, and upward mobility". This "American gospel" was best exemplified by Andrew Carnegie's Gospel of Wealth and Russell Conwell's famous sermon Acres of Diamonds, in which Conwell equated poverty with sin and asserted that anyone could become rich through hard work. This gospel of wealth, however, was an expression of Muscular Christianity and held that success resulted from personal effort rather than divine intervention.

The New Thought movement, which emerged in the 1880s, popularized the belief in the mind's power to achieve prosperity. While initially focused on achieving mental and physical health, New Thought teachers such as Charles Fillmore made material success a major emphasis of the movement. By the 20th century, New Thought concepts had saturated American popular culture, being common features of both self-help literature and popular psychology.

E. W. Kenyon, a Baptist minister and adherent of the Higher Life movement, is credited with introducing mind-power teachings into early Charismatic movement. In the 1890s, Kenyon attended Emerson College of Oratory where he was exposed to the New Thought movement. Kenyon later became connected with well-known Charismatic leaders and wrote about supernatural revelation and positive declarations. His writing influenced leaders of the nascent prosperity movement during the post-war American healing revival. Kenyon and later leaders in the prosperity movement have denied that the New Thought movement influenced him. Anthropologist Simon Coleman argues that there are "obvious parallels" between Kenyon's teachings and New Thought.

Kenyon taught that Christ's substitutionary atonement secured for believers a right to divine healing. This was attained through positive, faith-filled speech; the spoken word of God enabled believers to appropriate the same spiritual power that God used to create the world and to receive the provisions promised in Christ's death and resurrection. Prayer was understood as a binding legal act. Rather than asking, Kenyon taught believers to demand healing since they were already legally entitled to receive it.

Kenyon's blend of evangelical religion and mind-power beliefs—what he termed "overcoming faith"—resonated with a small but influential segment of the Pentecostal movement. Pentecostals had always been committed to faith healing; the movement also possessed a strong belief in the power of speech (in particular speaking in tongues and the use of the names of God, especially the name of Jesus). Kenyon's ideas would be reflected in the teachings of Pentecostal evangelists F. F. Bosworth and John G. Lake (who co-led a congregation with New Thought author Albert C. Grier before 1915).

=== Post 1945 Healing Revivals ===
While Kenyon's teachings on overcoming faith laid the groundwork for the prosperity gospel, the first generation of Pentecostals influenced by him and other figures, such as Bosworth, did not view faith as a means to attain material prosperity. In fact, early Pentecostals tended to view prosperity as a threat to a person's spiritual well-being. By the 1940s and 1950s, however, a recognizable form of the doctrine began to take shape within the Pentecostal movement through the teachings of deliverance and healing evangelists. Combining prosperity teaching with revivalism and faith healing, these evangelists taught "the laws of faith ('ask and ye shall receive') and the laws of divine reciprocity ('give and it will be given back unto you')".

Oral Roberts began teaching prosperity theology in 1947. He explained the laws of faith as a "blessing pact" in which God would return donations "seven fold", promising that donors would receive back from unexpected sources the money they donated to him. Roberts offered to return any donation that did not lead to an equivalent unexpected payment. In the 1970s, Roberts characterized his blessing-pact teaching as the "seed faith" doctrine: donations were a form of "seed" which would grow in value and be returned to the donor. Roberts began recruiting "partners", wealthy donors who received exclusive conference invitations and ministry access in exchange for support.

In 1953, faith healer A. A. Allen published The Secret to Scriptural Financial Success and promoted merchandise such as "miracle tent shavings" and prayer cloths anointed with "miracle oil". In the late 1950s, Allen increasingly focused on prosperity. He taught that faith could miraculously solve financial problems and claimed to have had a miraculous experience in which God supernaturally changed one-dollar bills into twenty-dollar bills, allowing him to pay his debts. Allen taught the "word of faith" or the power to speak something into being.

In the 1960s, prosperity became a primary focus in healing revivals. T. L. Osborn began emphasizing prosperity in the 1960s and became known for his often ostentatious displays of personal wealth. During that decade, Roberts and William Branham criticized other prosperity ministries, arguing that their fundraising tactics unfairly pressured attendees. These tactics were prompted in part by the expense of developing nationwide radio networks and campaign schedules. At the same time, leaders of the Pentecostal Assemblies of God denomination often criticized the focus on prosperity taken by independent healing evangelists.

=== Televangelism ===
During the 1960s, prosperity gospel teachers embraced televangelism and came to dominate religious programming in the United States. Oral Roberts was among the first to develop a syndicated weekly program that became the most-watched religious show in the United States. By 1968, television had supplanted the tent meeting in his ministry.

Reverend Ike, a pastor from New York City, began preaching about prosperity in the late 1960s. He soon had widely aired radio and television programs and became distinguished for his flashy style. His openness about love for material possessions and teachings about the "Science of the Mind" led many evangelists to distance themselves from him.

In the 1980s, public attention in the United States was drawn to prosperity theology by prominent televangelists such as Jim Bakker. Bakker's influence, however, waned after he was implicated in a high-profile scandal. In the aftermath, Trinity Broadcasting Network (TBN) emerged as the dominant force in prosperity televangelism, having brought Robert Tilton and Benny Hinn to prominence.

=== Word of Faith ===
Although nearly all healing evangelists of the 1940s and 1950s taught that faith could bring financial rewards, a new prosperity-oriented teaching emerged in the 1970s that differed from the teaching of Pentecostal evangelists of the 1950s. This "Positive Confession" or "Word of Faith" movement taught that a Christian with faith can speak into existence anything consistent with the will of God.

Kenneth Hagin was credited with a key role in the expansion of prosperity theology. He founded the RHEMA Bible Training Center in 1974, and over the next 20 years, the school trained more than 10,000 students in his theology. As is true of other prosperity movements, there is no theological governing body for the Word of Faith movement, and well-known ministries differ on some theological issues, though many ministries are unofficially linked. The teachings of Kenneth Hagin have been described by Candy Gunther Brown of Indiana University as the most "orthodox" form of Word of Faith prosperity teaching.

Kirk R. MacGregor of the University of Northern Iowa has argued that the theology of the Word of Faith movement has its roots in the Nation of Islam and Mormonism. The Nation of Islam, for example, holds that God (Allah) is literally a man, and that original humans were exactly like God. Frederick K. C. Price, a leader in the Word of Faith movement, citing Elijah Muhammad of the Nation of Islam, also asserted that God is literally a man and that Adam and Eve before the fall were exactly like God and hence "little gods".

Regarding Mormon (or Latter-day Saint) roots, one former leader of the church expressed his opinion (though not official church doctrine) that God the Father was once a mortal man who progressed to his current state. "Following the Father's example, all humans may be exalted to godhood..." Kenneth Copeland, another leader in the Word of Faith movement, makes similar claims, namely that God has a human body with eyes, ears, etc., and that the reason God created Adam was to reproduce himself. Thus, humans, once born again in the Christian sense, return to their godhood with divine power over their own lives, including their personal health and prosperity. Any failure to attain what a person needs or wants is a failure to truly understand their godhood as explained in the scriptures (i.e., the Bible). As Price states, "Whether you win or lose is not up to God. Whether you are a success or a failure is not up to God. It is up to you .... God is on vacation ...the work [he] did for our benefit is already done on [his] part."

=== International growth ===
By the late 2000s, proponents claimed that tens of millions of Christians had accepted prosperity theology. The neo-Pentecostal movement has been characterized in part by an emphasis on prosperity theology, which gained greater acceptance within charismatic Christianity during the late 1990s. In the 2000s, Evangelical-Pentecostal churches teaching prosperity theology saw significant growth in the Global South and Third World countries. According to Philip Jenkins of Pennsylvania State University, poor citizens of impoverished countries often find the doctrine appealing because of their economic powerlessness and the doctrine's emphasis on miracles. One region seeing explosive growth is Western Africa, particularly Nigeria. In the Philippines, the El Shaddai movement, part of the Catholic Charismatic Renewal, has spread prosperity theology outside Protestant Christianity. One South Korean prosperity church, Yoido Full Gospel Church, gained attention in the 1990s by claiming to be the world's largest congregation.

A 2006 poll by Time reported that 17 percent of Christians in America said they identified with the movement. By the 2000s, adherents of prosperity theology in the United States were most common in the Sun Belt. By 2006, three of the four largest congregations in the United States were teaching prosperity theology, and Joel Osteen has been credited with spreading it outside of the Pentecostal and Charismatic movement through his books, which have sold over 4 million copies. Bruce Wilkinson's The Prayer of Jabez also sold millions of copies and invited readers to seek prosperity.

=== Recent history ===
In 2005, Matthew Ashimolowo, the founder of the largely African Kingsway International Christian Centre in southern England, which preaches a "health and wealth" gospel and collects regular tithes, was ordered by the Charity Commission to repay money he had appropriated for his personal use. In 2017, the organisation was under criminal investigation after a leading member was found by a court in 2015 to have operated a Ponzi scheme between 2007 and 2011, losing or spending £8 million of investors' money.

In 2007, U.S. Senator Chuck Grassley opened a probe into the finances of six televangelism ministries that promoted prosperity theology: Kenneth Copeland Ministries, Creflo Dollar Ministries, Benny Hinn Ministries, Bishop Eddie Long Ministries, Joyce Meyer Ministries, and Paula White Ministries. In January 2011, Grassley concluded his investigation, stating that he believed self-regulation by religious organizations was preferable to government action. Only the ministries led by Meyer and Hinn cooperated with Grassley's investigation.

The inauguration of Donald Trump as the 45th President of the United States featured prayers from two preachers known for advocating prosperity theology. Paula White, one of Trump's spiritual advisers, gave the invocation.

== Theology ==
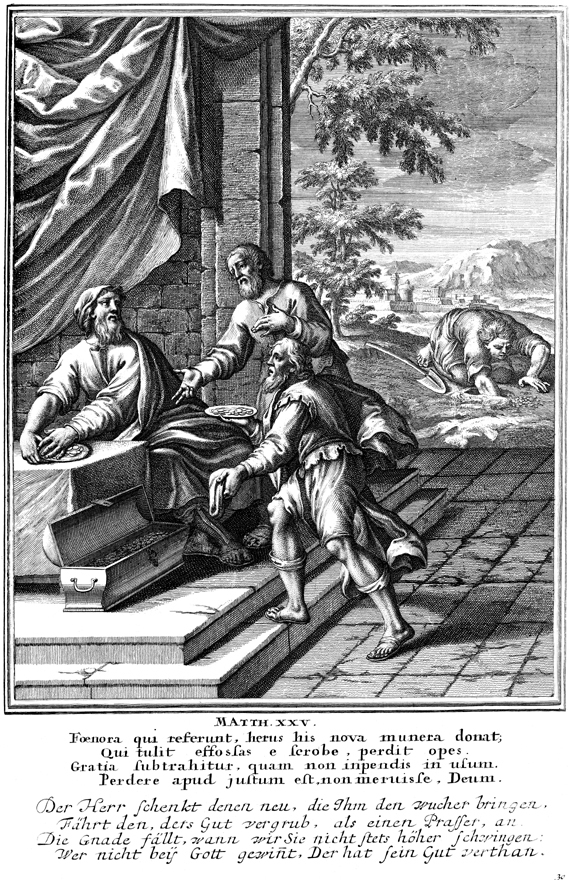
Proponents of prosperity theology often cite the parable of the talents (here depicted in a 1712 woodcut)

Prosperity theology teaches that Christians are entitled to well-being and, because spiritual and physical realities are seen as one inseparable reality, interprets well-being as physical health and economic prosperity. Teachers of the doctrine focus on personal empowerment, promoting a positive view of the spirit and body. They maintain that Christians have been given power over creation because they are made in the image of God and teach that positive confession allows Christians to exercise dominion over their souls and material objects around them. Leaders of the movement view the atonement as providing for the alleviation of sickness, poverty, and spiritual corruption; poverty and illness are cast as curses which can be broken by faith and righteous actions. There are, however, some prosperity churches that seek a more moderate or reformed paradigm of prosperity. Kirbyjon Caldwell, pastor of a Methodist megachurch, supports a theology of abundant life, teaching prosperity for the whole human being, which he sees as a path to combating poverty.

In prosperity theology, wealth is interpreted as a blessing from God, obtained through a spiritual law of positive confession, visualization, and donations. Believers may see this process in almost mechanical terms; Kenneth Copeland, an American author and televangelist, argues that prosperity is governed by laws, while other teachers portray the process formulaically. Journalists David van Biema and Jeff Chu of Time have described Word of Faith pastor Creflo Dollar's teachings about prosperity as an inviolable contract between God and humanity.

The prosperity theology teaching of positive confession stems from its proponents' view of scripture. The Bible is seen as a faith contract between God and believers; God is understood to be faithful and just, so believers must fulfill their end of the contract to receive God's promises. This leads to a belief in positive confession: the doctrine that believers may claim whatever they desire from God, simply by speaking it. Prosperity theology teaches that the Bible has promised prosperity for believers, so positive confession means that believers are speaking in faith what God has already spoken about them. Positive confession is practiced to bring about what is already believed-in; faith itself is a confession, and speaking it brings it into reality.

The teaching often depends on non-traditional interpretations of Bible verses, the Book of Malachi often being given special attention. While Christians have generally celebrated Malachi for its passages about the Messiah, teachers of prosperity theology usually focus on its descriptions of physical wealth. Frequently quoted verses include:

- Malachi 3:10: "'Bring ye all the tithes into the storehouse, that there may be meat in mine house, and prove me now herewith,' saith the Lord of hosts, 'if I will not open you the windows of heaven, and pour you out a blessing, that there shall not be room enough to receive it.'" (KJV)
- Matthew 25:14–30: the Parable of the talents
- Mark 11:24: "[Jesus said:] 'Therefore I say unto you, What things soever ye desire, when ye pray, believe that ye receive them, and ye shall have them.'" (KJV)
- John 10:10: "[Jesus said:] 'I am come that they might have life, and that they might have it more abundantly.'" (KJV)
- Philippians 4:19: "My God shall supply all your need according to his riches in glory by Christ Jesus." (KJV)
- 3 John 1:2: "Beloved, I wish above all things that thou mayest prosper and be in health, even as thy soul prospereth." (KJV)

Prosperity theology casts itself as the reclamation of true doctrine and thus part of a path to Christian dominion over secular society. It contends that God's promises of prosperity and victory to Israel in the Old Testament apply to New-Covenant Christians today, and that faith and holy actions release this prosperity. C. Peter Wagner, a leader of the New Apostolic Reformation, has argued that if Christians take dominion over aspects of society, the Earth will experience "peace and prosperity". Some Latin Americans who have embraced prosperity theology argue that Christianity has historically placed an unnecessary focus on suffering. They often view this as a Roman Catholic doctrine that should be discarded in favor of an emphasis on prosperity. Prosperity-theology advocates also argue that biblical promises of blessings awaiting the poor have been unnecessarily spiritualized, and should be understood literally.

=== Practices ===
Prosperity churches place a strong emphasis on giving. Some services include a teaching session focused on giving and prosperity, with Biblical references to tithing, followed by a sermon on another topic that follows the offering. Prosperity-church leaders often claim that a specific blessing can be exchanged for the money donated to their ministry; some have reportedly instructed worshippers to hold their donations above their heads during prayer.

Congregants in prosperity churches are encouraged to make positive statements about aspects of their lives they wish to improve. These statements, known as "positive confessions" (distinct from confessions of sin), are said to miraculously change aspects of people's lives if spoken with faith. Prosperity churches also encourage people to "live without limits" and to cultivate optimism about their lives. T. D. Jakes, pastor of The Potter's House non-denominational megachurch, has argued in favor of prosperity, rejecting what he sees as the demonization of success. He views poverty as a barrier to living a Christian life, suggesting that it is easier to make a positive impact on society when one is affluent.

While some prosperity churches have a reputation for manipulating and alienating the poor, many are involved in social programs. Underlying these programs is a theology of empowerment and human flourishing to release people from a "welfare" or "victim" mentality. Many prosperity churches hold seminars on financial responsibility. Kate Bowler, an academic who studies prosperity theology, has criticized such seminars, arguing that, though they contain some sound advice, they often emphasize the purchase of expensive possessions. Hanna Rosin of The Atlantic argues that prosperity theology contributed to the real estate bubble that caused the 2008 financial crisis. She maintains that prosperity churches heavily emphasized home ownership, relying on divine financial intervention, which led to unwise choices based on actual financial ability.

Most churches in the prosperity movement are non-denominational and independent, though some groups have formed networks. Prosperity churches typically reject presbyterian polity (or governance) and the idea that a pastor should be accountable to elders; it is common for pastors of prosperity churches to be the highest organizational authority-figure. Critics, including Sarah Posner and Joe Conason, maintain that prosperity teachers cultivate authoritarian organizations. They argue that leaders attempt to control adherents' lives by claiming divinely bestowed authority. Jenkins contends that prosperity theology is used as a tool to justify the high salaries of pastors.

== Reception ==
=== Socioeconomic analysis ===
In the United States, the movement has drawn many followers from the middle class and is most popular in commuter towns and urban areas. In Exporting the American Gospel: Global Christian Fundamentalism Steve Brouwer, Paul Gifford, and Susan Rose speculate that the movement was fueled by a prevailing disdain for social liberalism in the United States that began in the 1970s. Rosin argues that prosperity theology emerged because of broader trends, particularly American economic optimism in the 1950s and 1990s. Tony Lin of the University of Virginia has also compared the teaching to manifest destiny, the 19th-century belief that the United States was entitled to the West. Marvin Harris argues that the doctrine's focus on the material world is a symptom of the secularization of American religion. He sees it as an attempt to fulfill the American Dream by using supernatural power.

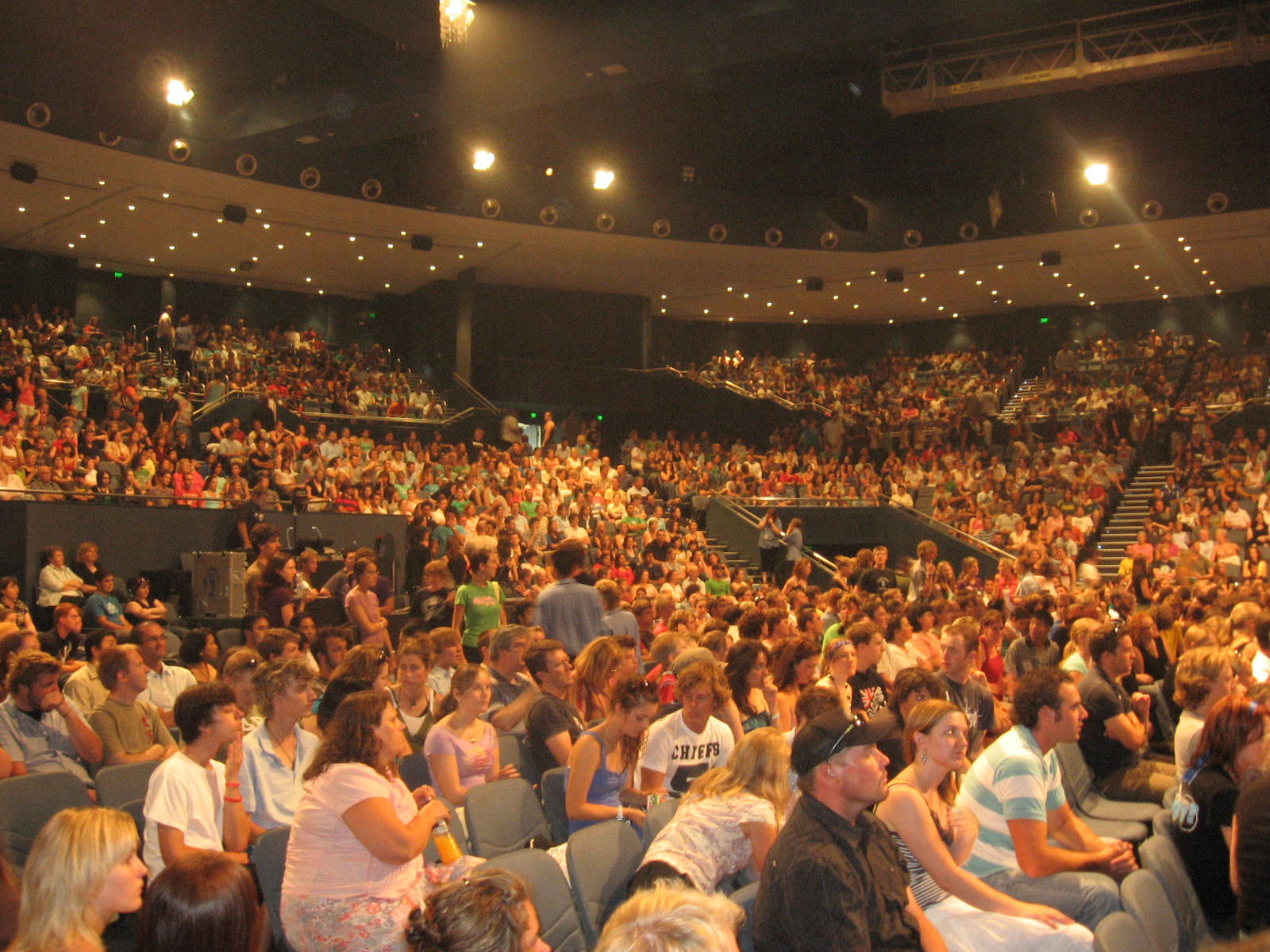
Hillsong Church in Sydney

Prosperity theology has become popular among poor Americans, particularly those who seek personal and social advancement. It has seen significant growth in black and Hispanic churches and is particularly popular among immigrants. Apologists for the movement note its ethnic diversity and argue that it encompasses a variety of views. Joel Robbins of Cambridge University notes that most anthropologists attribute the theology's appeal to the poor—especially in the Global South—to the fact that it promises security and helps explain capitalism. Simon Coleman developed a theory based on the doctrine's rhetoric and the feeling of belonging it gave parishioners. In a study of the Swedish Word of Life Church, he noted that members felt part of a complex gift-exchange system, giving to God and then awaiting a gift in return (either directly from God or from another church member). Hillsong Church, the largest congregation in Australia, teaches a form of prosperity theology that emphasizes personal success. Marion Maddox has argued that this message has drawn a significant number of upwardly mobile Australians. Scott Morrison, who became the 30th Prime Minister of Australia in August 2018, is a member of Horizon Church, a Pentecostal church that believes in prosperity theology.

In a 1998 interview in Christianity Today, Bong Rin Ro of the Asia Graduate School of Theology suggested that the growth in popularity of prosperity theology in South Korea reflects a strong "shamanistic influence". Bong pointed to parallels between the tradition of paying shamans for healing and the prosperity theology's contractual doctrine about giving and blessings. Asia's economic problems, he argued, encouraged the growth of the doctrine in South Korea, though he claims it ignores the poor and needy. During the interview, he stated that he saw the problem beginning to be reversed, citing calls for renewed faith and other practices. Cho Yong-gi, pastor of Yoido Full Gospel Church in Seoul, has been criticized for shamanizing Christianity. This criticism has focused on his healing and exorcism ministries and his promise of material blessings. Malaysian Christian writer Hwa Yung has defended Cho's healing and exorcism ministries, arguing that he successfully contextualized the gospel in a culture where shamanism was still prevalent. However, Hwa criticizes Cho's teaching of earthly blessings for not reflecting a trust in God's daily provision and for their heavy focus on earthly wealth.

=== Comparisons with other movements ===
Historian Carter Lindberg of Boston University has drawn parallels between contemporary prosperity theology and the medieval indulgence trade. Comparisons have also been made to Calvinism, but John T. McNeill disputes the widespread semi-Weberian idea that Calvinism promoted the idea of prosperity as a marker of the elect. Coleman notes that several pre–20th century Christian movements in the United States taught that a holy lifestyle was a path to prosperity and that God-ordained hard work would bring blessing.

Coleman has speculated that modern-day prosperity theology borrows heavily from the New Thought movement, though he admits that the connection is sometimes unclear. Jenkins notes that critics draw a parallel between prosperity theology and the cargo cult phenomenon. While citing the popularity of prosperity theology in agrarian African communities, he argues that it can also bear similarities to traditional African religious rituals. J. Matthew Wilson of Southern Methodist University compares the movement to Black theology owing to its focus on uplifting oppressed groups, though he notes that it differs in its concentration on individual success rather than corporate political change.

Observers have proposed that some doctrines and beliefs found in the Church of Jesus Christ of Latter-day Saints (LDS Church) are reminiscent of prosperity theology. This includes a similar interpretation of Malachi 3:10 found among LDS members as among Protestant prosperity theology and LDS lesson manuals teaching a "prosperity cycle" that shows material wealth follows from obedience to God. A Harper's Magazine editorial from 2011 alleged that these similarities were behind the Republican Party's economic policies, and further claimed that "In comparison to most other Protestant denominations, Mormonism has an established tradition of entrepreneurship and less ambivalence about the pursuit of wealth." However, it also explicitly noted that "None of the prosperity gospel's proponents are themselves Mormon." One of the church's current senior leaders has also taught against prosperity theology.

=== Criticism ===
Mainstream evangelicalism has consistently opposed prosperity theology as heretical and prosperity ministries have frequently come into conflict with other Christian groups, including those within the Pentecostal and Charismatic movements. Critics, such as Evangelical pastor Michael Catt, have argued that prosperity theology has little in common with traditional Christian theology. Prominent evangelical leaders, such as Rick Warren, Ben Witherington III, and Jerry Falwell, have harshly criticized the movement, sometimes denouncing it as heretical. Warren proposes that prosperity theology promotes the idolatry of money, and others argue that Jesus' teachings indicate a disdain for material wealth. In Mark: Jesus, Servant and Savior, R. Kent Hughes notes that some 1st-century rabbis portrayed material blessings as a sign of God's favor. He cites Jesus's statement in Mark 10:25, "It is easier for a camel to go through the eye of a needle, than for a rich man to enter into the kingdom of God" (KJV), as evidence against such thinking.

Other critics of the movement assail promises made by its leaders, arguing that the broad freedom from problems they promise is irresponsible. Televangelists are often criticized for abusing the faith of their listeners by enriching themselves through large donations. Prosperity theology has been opposed for not adequately explaining the poverty of the Apostles. For instance, some theologians believe that the life and writings of Paul the Apostle, who is thought to have endured significant suffering during his ministry, are particularly at odds with prosperity theology. Cathleen Falsani, a religion writer in an opinion piece in The Washington Post, points to the conflict with basic Christian teachings: "Jesus was born poor, and he died poor. During his earthly tenure, he spoke time and again about the importance of spiritual wealth and health. When he talked about material wealth, it was usually part of a cautionary tale."

In their book Health, Wealth and Happiness, theologians David Jones and Russell Woodbridge characterize the doctrine as poor theology. They suggest that righteousness cannot be earned and that the Bible does not promise an easy life. They argue that it is inconsistent with the gospel of Jesus and propose that the central message of the gospel should be Jesus's life, death, and resurrection. Jones and Woodbridge see Jesus's importance as vital, criticizing the prosperity gospel for marginalizing him in favor of a focus on human need. In another article, Jones criticizes the prosperity theology interpretation of the Abrahamic covenant, God's promise to bless Abraham's descendants, arguing that this blessing is spiritual and should already apply to all Christians. He also argues that the proponents of the doctrine misconstrue the atonement, criticizing their teaching that Jesus's death took away poverty as well as sin. He believes this teaching stems from a misunderstanding of Jesus's life. He criticizes John Avanzini's claim that Jesus was wealthy as a misrepresentation, noting that Paul often taught Christians to give up their material possessions. Although he accepts giving as "praiseworthy", he questions the motives of prosperity theology. He criticizes the "Law of Compensation", which teaches that when Christians give generously, God will give back more. Rather, Jones cites Jesus's teaching to "give, hoping for nothing in return". Jones and Woodbridge also note that Jesus instructed followers to focus on spiritual rewards, citing his command in Matthew 6:19–20 "Lay not up for yourselves treasures upon earth ... But lay up for yourselves treasures in heaven" (KJV). Jones criticizes the doctrine's view of faith: he does not believe that it should be used as a spiritual force for material gain but seen as selfless acceptance of God.

The General Council of the Assemblies of God USA criticized the doctrine of positive confession in 1980, noting examples of negative confessions in the Bible (where Biblical figures express fears and doubts) that had positive results and contrasting these examples with the focus on positive confessions taught by prosperity theology. The Council argues that the biblical Greek word often translated as "confess" literally means "to speak the same thing" and refers to both positive and negative confessions. The statement also criticizes the doctrine for failing to recognize the will of God: God's will should have precedence over the will of man, including their desires for wealth, and Christians should "recognize the sovereignty of God". The statement further criticizes prosperity theology for overlooking the importance of prayer, arguing that prayer should be used for all requests, not simply positive confession. The Council noted that Christians should expect suffering in this life. They urge readers to apply practical tests to positive confession, arguing that the doctrine appeals to those who are already in affluent societies, but that many Christians in other societies are impoverished or imprisoned. Finally, the paper criticizes the distinction made by advocates of prosperity theology in the two Greek words that mean "speaking", arguing that the distinction is false and that they are used interchangeably in the Greek text. The Council accused prosperity theology of taking passages out of context to fulfill its own needs, with the result that the doctrine of positive confession is contradictory to the holistic message of the Bible.

The president of the Nigerian Baptist Convention criticized prosperity theology as a damaging teaching that departs from the central message of the Bible, namely the cross of Jesus.

In April 2015, Dallin H. Oaks, an apostle of The Church of Jesus Christ of Latter-day Saints, stated that people who believe in "the theology of prosperity" are deceived by riches. He continued by saying that the "possession of wealth or significant income is not a mark of heavenly favor, and their absence is not evidence of heavenly disfavor". He also cited how Jesus differentiated the attitudes towards money held by the young rich man in Mark 10:17–24, the good Samaritan, and Judas Iscariot in his betrayal. Oaks concluded this portion of his sermon by highlighting that the "root of all evil is not money but the love of money".

That same year, well known pastor and prosperity gospel advocate Creflo Dollar launched a fundraising campaign to replace a previous private jet with a $65 million Gulfstream G650. On the August 16, 2015 episode of his HBO weekly series Last Week Tonight, John Oliver satirized prosperity theology by announcing that he had established his own tax-exempt church, called Our Lady of Perpetual Exemption. In a lengthy segment, Oliver focused on what he characterized as the predatory conduct of televangelists who appeal to people in financial distress or personal crises for repeated gifts, and he criticized the very loose requirements for entities seeking tax-exempt status as churches under U.S. tax law. Oliver said he would ultimately donate any money the church collects to Doctors Without Borders.

Antonio Spadaro and Marcelo Figueroa, in the Jesuit journal La Civiltà Cattolica, examined the origins of the prosperity gospel in the United States and described it as a reductive version of the American Dream which had offered opportunities of success and prosperity unreachable in the Old World. The authors distinguished the prosperity gospel from Max Weber's Protestant ethic, noting that the Protestant ethic linked prosperity to religiously inspired austerity. In contrast, the prosperity gospel viewed prosperity as a direct result of personal faith. They criticized many aspects of the prosperity gospel, noting particularly the tendency of believers to lack compassion for the poor, since their poverty was seen as a sign that they had not followed the rules and therefore are not loved by God.

In a Catholic Answers article from 2017, Catholic apologist Trent Horn called prosperity theology a "fake gospel" and said that its attitude "turns prayer and good works into tools that try to manipulate God into bestowing blessings upon us". He pointed out that many people are in poverty because of reasons outside of their control, and not because they did not secure a blessing from God.

A 2019 documentary entitled American Gospel: Christ Alone presents many critical analyses of the prosperity gospel while following the stories of individuals whose lives had intersected with prosperity teachings, including Costi Hinn, nephew of Benny Hinn.

The reality television series Preachers of L.A. follows the lives of pastors who adhere to prosperity theology. In a review, Cathleen Falsani described it as imitating other reality series with "McMansions, bling, hair extensions, luxury cars, pontificating, preening and epic delusions of grandeur".

John Piper has said that "the prosperity gospel will not make anybody praise Jesus; it will make people praise prosperity."

== Notable works by advocates ==
Notable works that advocate prosperity theology include:

- Hill, Edward (2019). Prosperous Christian: 10 Commandments of Godly Prosperity. Pensacola, Florida: Best Seller Publishing. ISBN 978-1-949535-38-9.
- Lindsay, Gordon (1960). God's Master Key to Prosperity. Dallas, Texas: Christ for the Nations Institute. ISBN 978-0-89985-001-6.
- Osteen, Joel (2004). Your Best Life Now: 7 Steps to Living at Your Full Potential. New York: FaithWords. ISBN 978-0-446-53275-4.
- Roberts, Oral; Montgomery, G. H. (1966). God's Formula for Success and Prosperity. Tulsa, Oklahoma: Abundant Life Publication. OCLC 4654539.
- Wilkinson, Bruce; Kopp, David (2000). The Prayer of Jabez: Breaking Through to the Blessed Life. Colorado Springs, Colorado: Multnomah Books. ISBN 978-1-57673-733-0.
- Ziglar, Zig (1975). See You at the Top. Gretna, Louisiana: Pelican. ISBN 0-88289-126-X.
- Ziglar, Zig (2006). Better Than Good: Creating a Life You Can't Wait to Live. Nashville, Tennessee: Thomas Nelson. ISBN 978-0-7852-8919-7.
- Ziglar, Zig; Ziglar, Tom (2012). Born to Win: Find Your Success Code. Dallas, Texas: Success Media. ISBN 9780983156512.

== See also ==
- Dominion theology
- New Apostolic Reformation
- Law of attraction
- Mammon
- Ziklag (organization)
- New Thought
- Protestant work ethic

== Explanatory notes ==
1. Pejorative nicknames have been attached to the theology, including "name it and claim it" and "blab it and grab it".
2. The theme of Abundant Life is sometimes used by leaders associated with the Word of Faith movement to refer to the experience of congregants who corporately experience the results of faith.
3. Bakker renounced prosperity theology after being imprisoned for fraud.
4. Osteen's teachings are often described as a moderate form of prosperity theology.
5. After the probe was opened, Joyce Meyer Ministries voluntarily joined the Evangelical Council for Financial Accountability.
6. The Council notes that the words Rhema and Logos are used interchangeably in the New Testament, and a Hebrew word is rendered into both words in different passages of the Septuagint.
7. Prosperity theology is often seen as supporting laissez-faire economics.

== General and cited references ==
- Balmer, Randall Herbert (2002). Encyclopedia of Evangelicalism. Westminster John Knox Press. ISBN 978-0-664-22409-7.
- Billingsley, Scott (2008). It's a New Day: Race and Gender in the Modern Charismatic Movement. University of Alabama Press. ISBN 978-0-8173-1606-8.
- Bowler, Kate (2013). Blessed: A History of the American Prosperity Gospel. Oxford University Press. ISBN 978-0199827695.
- Brown, Candy Gunther (2011). Global Pentecostal and Charismatic Healing. Oxford University Press. ISBN 978-0-19-539341-5.
- Ciampa, Roy E.; Rosner, Brian S. (2010). The First Letter to the Corinthians. William B. Eerdmans Publishing Company. ISBN 978-0-8028-3732-5.
- Clifton, Shane (2009). Pentecostal Churches in Transition: Analysing the Developing Ecclesiology of the Assemblies of God in Australia. Global Pentecostal and Charismatic Studies. Vol. 3. Brill Academic Publishers. ISBN 978-90-04-17526-6.
- Coleman, Simon (2016). "The Prosperity Gospel: Debating Charisma, Controversy, and Capitalism". In Hunt, Stephen J. (ed.). Handbook of Global Contemporary Christianity: Movements, Institutions, and Allegiance. Brill Handbooks on Contemporary Religion. Vol. 12. Leiden: Brill Publishers. pp. 276–296. doi:10.1163/9789004310780_014. ISBN 978-90-04-26539-4. ISSN 1874-6691.
- Coleman, Simon (2000). The Globalisation of Charismatic Christianity: Spreading the Gospel of Prosperity. Cambridge University Press. ISBN 978-0-521-66072-3.
- Elisha, Omri (2011). Moral Ambition: Mobilization and Social Outreach in Evangelical Megachurches. University of California Press. ISBN 978-0-520-26751-0.
- General Council of the Assemblies of God (1980). The Believer and Positive Confession (PDF). Assemblies of God. OCLC 15063312. Archived from the original (PDF) on June 11, 2012.
- Harrell, David Edwin (1975). All Things are Possible: the Healing & Charismatic Revivals in Modern America. Indiana University Press. ISBN 978-0-253-10090-0.
- Harris, Marvin (1981). America Now: the Anthropology of a Changing Culture. Simon & Schuster. ISBN 978-0-671-43148-8.
- Hughes, R. Kent (1989). Mark: Jesus, Servant and Savior. Vol. 2. Crossway Books. ISBN 978-0-89107-537-0.
- Hunt, Stephen (2000). "'Winning Ways': Globalisation and the Impact of the Health and Wealth Gospel". Journal of Contemporary Religion. 15 (3): 332. doi:10.1080/713676038. S2CID 145184658.
- Hwa, Yung (1997). Mangoes or bananas?: the Quest for an Authentic Asian Christian Theology. Regnum International. ISBN 978-1-870345-25-5.
- Jenkins, Philip (2006). The new Faces of Christianity: Believing the Bible in the Global South. Oxford University Press. ISBN 978-0-19-530065-9.
- Jenkins, Philip (2011). The Next Christendom: The Coming of Global Christianity. Oxford University Press. ISBN 978-0-19-976746-5.
- Jones, David; Woodbridge, Russell (2011). Health, Wealth & Happiness: Has the Prosperity Gospel Overshadowed the Gospel of Christ?. Kregel Publications. ISBN 978-0-8254-2930-9.
- Klassen, Michael J. (2009). Strange Fire, Holy Fire: Exploring the Highs and Lows of Your Charismatic Experience. Baker Publishing Group. ISBN 978-0-7642-0549-1.
- Lindberg, Carter (2010). The European Reformations (2nd ed.). Wiley-Blackwell. ISBN 978-1-4051-8067-2.
- Maddox, Marion (2012). Farhadian, Charles E. (ed.). Introducing World Christianity. John Wiley & Sons. ISBN 978-1-4051-8248-5.
- McNeill, John T. (1954). The History and Character of Calvinism. London: Oxford University Press. p. 222. ISBN 9780199727995.
- Patterson, Eric; Rybarczyk, Edmund John (2007). The Future of Pentecostalism in the United States. Lexington Books. ISBN 978-0-7391-2103-0.
- Poloma, Margaret (1989). The Assemblies of God at the Crossroads: Charisma and Institutional Dilemmas. University of Tennessee Press. ISBN 978-0-87049-607-3.
- Posner, Sarah; Conason, Joe (2008). God's Profits: Faith, Fraud, and the Republican Crusade for Values Voters. Polipoint Press. ISBN 978-0-9794822-1-2.
- Robins, R. G. (2010). Pentecostalism in America. ABC-CLIO. ISBN 978-0-313-35294-2.
- Robbins, Joel (2010). Allan Anderson (ed.). Studying Global Pentecostalism: Theories and Methods. Michael Bergunder, André Droogers, and Cornelis van der Laan. University of California Press. ISBN 978-0-520-26662-9.
- Smith, James K. A. (2010). Thinking in Tongues: Pentecostal Contributions to Christian Philosophy. William B. Eerdmans Publishing. ISBN 978-0-8028-6184-9.
- Walton, Jonathan L. (2009). Watch This! The Ethics and Aesthetics of Black Televangelism. NYU Press. ISBN 978-0-8147-9417-3.
- Wiegele, Katharine L. (2005). Investing in Miracles: El Shaddai and the Transformation of Popular Catholicism in the Philippines. University of Hawaii Press. ISBN 978-0-8248-2861-5.
- Wilson, J. Matthew (2007). From Pews to Polling Places: Faith and Politics in the American Religious Mosaic. Georgetown University Press. ISBN 978-1-58901-172-4.
