= Chip Ingram =

American pastor (born 1954)

- Born: Ralph Browne Ingram II; June 21, 1954 (age 72); Columbus, Ohio, U.S.
- Education: West Liberty University; Dallas Theological Seminary
- Occupations: Pastor, author, orator
- Spouse: Theresa Ingram
- Children: 4, including Jason Ingram
- Website: livingontheedge.org/about-us/chip-ingram

Ralph Browne "Chip" Ingram II (born June 21, 1954) is an American Christian pastor, author, and teacher. He is the founder, teaching pastor, and chief executive officer of Living on the Edge, an international teaching and discipleship ministry. A pastor for over 30 years, Chip is the author of many books, including Culture Shock, The Real Heaven, The Real God, The Invisible War, and Love, Sex, and Lasting Relationships.

== Early life ==
Originally from Columbus, Ohio, Ingram grew up in what he called "a negative religious environment". In his book Living on the Edge: Dare to Experience True Spirituality, Ingram recounts growing up in a church that did not believe in the Bible or in having a personal relationship with Jesus Christ: "We read our prayers, we said the right things, we fulfilled our religious duty, and then we went home. There was absolutely no expectation that what we did on Sunday would have any impact on how we lived the rest of the week.”

As a result, by the time Ingram was a teenager, he was disengaged from church and God. He recalls, "I wanted to believe, but the older I got, the less interested I became in going through the religious motions and pretending and saying things that no one lived or believed."

=== The intersection of faith and basketball ===
Ingram went on to graduate from West Liberty State College in 1976. Afterwards, he received an invitation from Sports Ambassadors to travel overseas with other college basketball players from around the nation using basketball as a vehicle for evangelism. Ingram toured the Caribbean, South America, and Asia with three international basketball teams, a trip that he said to be the turning point of his life.

While he was on tour, he caught a vision that God could use an ordinary person like him to accomplish extraordinary things. Ingram started to believe that God was not calling him to coach athletes, but to "coach" people for Jesus Christ and become a pastor.

== Ministry ==
In 1982, Ingram began his pastoral ministry at Country Bible Church in Kaufman, Texas, a rural community near Dallas. Under his leadership, the church grew from 30 to 500 people. In 1990, he became the senior pastor for Santa Cruz Bible Church in Santa Cruz, California, where he led a church congregation of 1,000 that grew to over 4,000.

In 1995, he founded Living on the Edge as a nationally syndicated radio ministry; it has since grown into an international Christian discipleship ministry. In 2003 Ingram moved to Atlanta, Georgia, to become president and chief executive officer of Walk Thru the Bible Ministries, succeeding Bruce Wilkinson.

In 2009, Ingram became the senior pastor for Venture Christian Church in Los Gatos, California, where he was until 2018.

Today, Ingram is chief executive officer and teaching pastor of Living on the Edge. He is the author of 15 books and several studies for small-group ministry.

== Education ==
Ingram completed his undergraduate work at West Liberty State College, and went on to earn a Master of Education from West Virginia University and a Master of Theology from Dallas Theological Seminary.

== Family ==
Ingram and his wife, Theresa, have four children (including the songwriter Jason Ingram) and 12 grandchildren.

== Works ==
- Culture Shock: A Biblical Response to Today's Most Divisive Issues. Baker Books. 2014. ISBN 978-0801016127.
- Love, Sex, and Lasting Relationships. Baker Books. 2015. ISBN 978-0801017070.
- Spiritual Simplicity: Doing Less, Loving More. Howard Books. 2012. ISBN 978-1439138274.
- True Spirituality: Becoming a Romans 12 Christian. Howard Books. 2012. ISBN 978-1476727639.
- Living on the Edge: Dare to Experience True Spirituality. Howard Books. 2011. ISBN 9781439190524.
- Good to Great in God's Eyes. Baker Books. 2012. ISBN 978-0801014277.
- Finding God When You Need Him Most. Revel. 2013. ISBN 978-0800788384.
- The Miracle of Life Change: How God Transforms His Children. Moody Publishers. 2004. ISBN 0802429807.
- Overcoming Emotions That Destroy. Baker Books. 2010. ISBN 978-0801072390.
- Holy Ambition: What It Takes to Make a Difference for God. Moody Publishers. 2010. ISBN 978-0802429834.
- The Invisible War. Baker Books. 2007. ISBN 978-0801068256.
- Effective Parenting in a Defective World: How to Raise Kids Who Stand Out from the Crowd. Focus on the Family. 2007. ISBN 978-1414303840.
- Sex 180: The Next Revolution. Baker Books. 2005. ISBN 0801045290.
- God As He Longs for You to See Him. Baker Books. 2006. ISBN 0801066107.
- Holy Transformation: What It Takes for God to Make a Difference in You. Moody Publishers. 2003. ISBN 0802429793.
- I Am With You Always. Baker Books. 2004. ISBN 0801064988.
