= United States Senate inquiry into the tax-exempt status of religious organizations =

Investigation lasting from 2007 to 2011

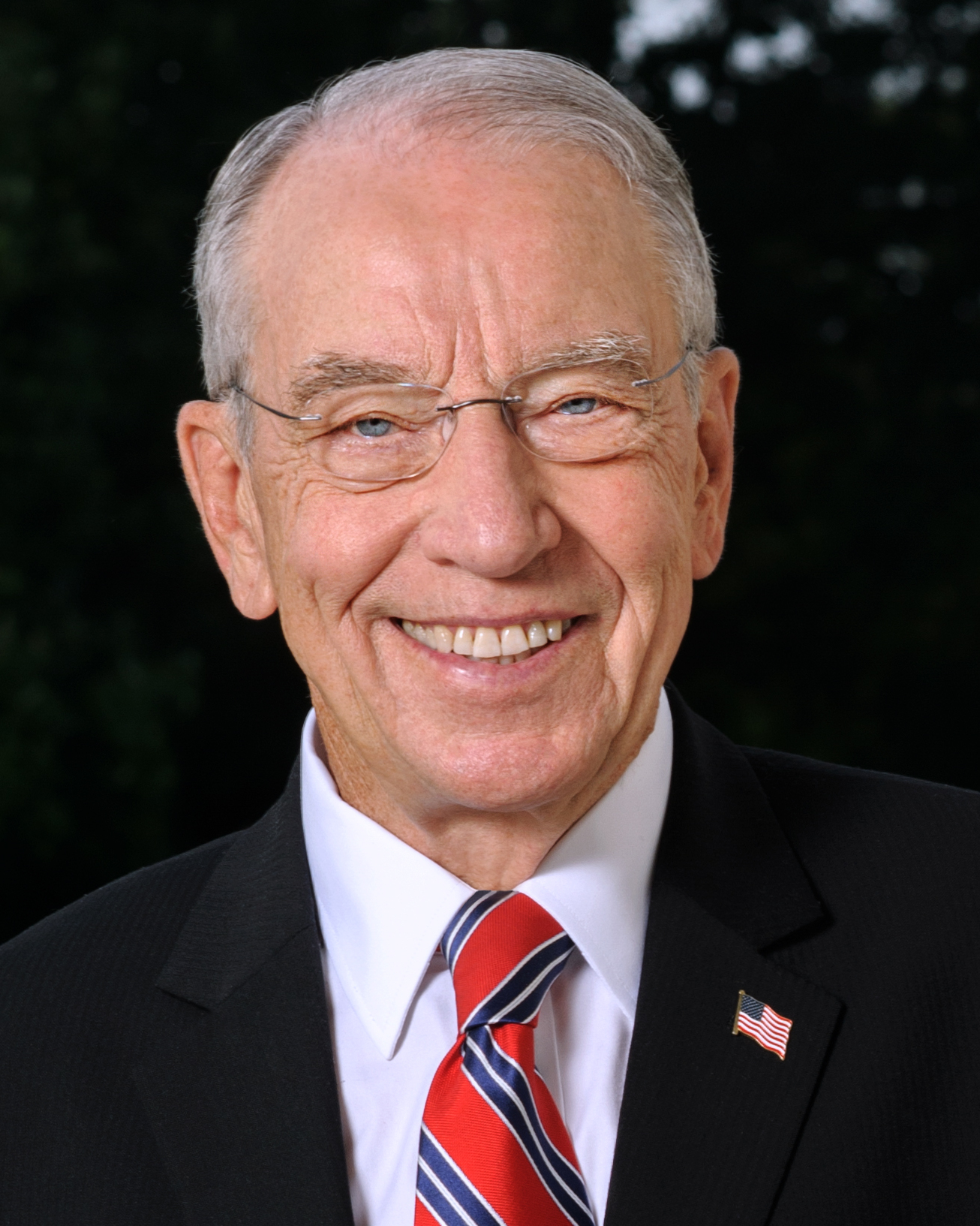
Senator Chuck Grassley

The United States Senate inquiry into the tax-exempt status of religious organizations was an investigation of six 501(c) religious organizations conducted by the United States Senate Committee on Finance lasting from 2007 until 2011.

== Background ==
On November 5, 2007, United States Senator Chuck Grassley announced an investigation into the tax-exempt status of six ministries under the leadership of Benny Hinn, Paula White, Eddie L. Long, Joyce Meyer, Creflo Dollar, and Kenneth Copeland by the United States Senate Committee on Finance. In letters to each ministry, Grassley asked for the ministries to divulge specific financial information to the committee to determine whether or not funds collected by each organization were inappropriately utilized by ministry heads. By the December 6, 2007 deadline, only three of the ministries had shown compliance with the Finance Committee's request. On March 11, 2008, Grassley and Finance Chairman Max Baucus sent follow-up letters to Kenneth Copeland, Creflo Dollar and Eddie Long, explaining that the Senate reserved the right to investigate the finances of their organizations under federal tax laws. The Associated Press reported that Grassley said the investigation was a response to complaints from the public and news media. Grassley stated, "The allegations involve governing boards that aren't independent and allow generous salaries and housing allowances and amenities such as private jets and Rolls Royces." IRS guidelines require that pastors' compensation be "reasonable" and net earnings may not benefit any private individual.

Responses from these ministers included arguments about Congressional power to oversee such matters. They claim that only the IRS has the authority to request such information, and should the IRS request it or pursue an investigation, the ministries involved would comply.

== Investigation ==
=== Benny Hinn Ministries ===
In a letter to Benny Hinn Ministries, Grassley asked for the ministry to divulge financial information to the Senate Committee on Finance to determine if Hinn made any personal profit from financial donations, and requested that Hinn's ministry make the information available by December 6, 2007. On December 6, 2007, Hinn told the Associated Press that he would not respond to the inquiry until 2008. Hinn's ministry has since responded to the inquiry, and Senator Grassley commented that, "... Benny Hinn [has] engaged in open and honest dialogue with committee staff. They have not only provided responses to every question but, in the spirit of true cooperation, also have provided information over and above what was requested."

=== Bishop Eddie Long Ministries ===
Long did not cooperate with the investigation, including refusing to disclose his salary. The outcome of the three-year investigation was that there was no definitive findings of wrongdoing, and the pastors who refused to cooperate received no penalties.

=== Paula White Ministries ===
When CBS News reported the story, White's ministry denied any wrongdoing, and on March 31, 2008, the Senate Finance Committee received a joint financial report from Without Walls International Church and Paula White Ministries. Without Walls International Church was one of four ministries that refused to provide the full information Senator Grassley requested. White interpreted the conclusion of the investigation to mean that Without Walls International Church was cleared.

=== Creflo Dollar Ministries ===
Grassley asked for financial information to determine whether Dollar made any personal profit from financial donations and requested that Dollar's ministry make the information available by December 6, 2007.

Dollar contested the probe, arguing that the proper governmental entity to examine religious groups is the IRS, not the Committee on Finance.

=== Kenneth Copeland Ministries ===
Grassley asked for the ministry to divulge financial information to the committee to determine if Copeland made any personal profit from financial donations, and requested that Copeland's ministry make the information available by December 6, 2007. The Copelands responded with a "Financial report from Kenneth Copeland Ministries." KCM created a website to help explain their side of the inquiry. The three-year investigation found no definitive findings of wrongdoing and assessed no penalties for the pastors in question.

=== Joyce Meyer Ministries ===
Grassley asked Joyce Meyer Ministries to divulge financial information to the committee to determine if Meyer made any personal profit from financial donations, asking for a detailed accounting for such things as cosmetic surgery and foreign bank accounts and citing such expenses as a $23,000 commode. He also requested that Meyer's ministry make the information available by December 6, 2007.

Meyer's ministry was one of two that complied with the Senate's requests for financial records and made commitments to future financial transparency.

==== Commode controversy ====
While many have mistakenly associated this piece of furniture with a common household toilet, this particular term actually refers to the classic definition of commode identified by Webster's Dictionary as, 'a tall elegant chest of drawers.'

— Joyce Meyer Ministries

In her November 29 response to Grassley, Meyer notes that the commode is a chest of drawers. Meyer writes that it was part of a 68-piece lot of items totaling $262,000 that were needed to furnish the ministry's 150,000-square-foot (14,000 m^{2}) headquarters purchased in 2001. She said the commode's price tag was an "errant value" assigned by the selling agent and apologized for "not paying close attention to specific 'assigned values' placed on the pieces."

==== Financial reports ====
Joyce Meyer Ministries responded with a newsletter to its e-mail list subscribers on November 9, 2007. The organization referred to its annual financial reports, asserting that in 2006, the ministry spent 82 percent of its total expenses "for outreach and program services toward reaching people with the Gospel of Jesus Christ, as attested by independent accounting firm Stanfield & O'Dell, LLP." The message also quoted an October 10, 2007, letter from the Internal Revenue Service which stated, "We determined that you [Joyce Meyer Ministries] continue to qualify as an organization exempt from federal income tax under IRC section 501(c)(3)." The same information was also posted to the ministry website.

== Review ==
On March 16, 2009, Grassley, now only an individual Senator on the committee, stated "My staff and I continue to review the information we've received from the ministries that cooperated, and we continue to weigh our options for the ministries that have not cooperated," noting that two of the ministries, Hinn's and Meyer's, gave full financial disclosure. Senator Grassley solicited assistance from the Evangelical Council for Financial Accountability and its president, Kenneth Behr, in the inquiry. Behr was interviewed and often quoted by major news networks and said, "Grassley is being very careful in his inquiry, not going into doctrinal issues and whether the prosperity churches are doctrinally sound."

== Conclusion ==
On January 6, 2011, Senator Grassley concluded the three-year investigation with no penalties and no definitive findings of wrongdoing.

== Aftermath ==
Donations to Eddie Long Ministries dropped significantly following the controversies surrounding Long's salary and church finances.

The Alliance Defending Freedom protested the investigation and the National Religious Broadcasters said the questions Senator Grassley asked were too broad. The Evangelical Council for Financial Accountability made plans to create a national commission in response to the Grassley report to lead a review on accountability and policy.
