= Kate Bowler =

Canadian academic and writer

Dr. Kate Bowler (born June 16, 1980) is a Canadian academic and writer from Winnipeg, Manitoba. Bowler works at Duke Divinity School as an associate professor of the history of Christianity in North America. Her doctoral dissertation became the inspiration for her first book, Blessed: A History of the American Prosperity Gospel; in the following years, she has published seven other titles. Bowler also is the host of the podcast Everything Happens with Kate Bowler, a product of Lemonada media.

== Early life and education ==
Bowler was born in 1980 in London, England where her father Gerry Bowler was pursuing a PhD in history at King's College London; he is currently a professor at the University of Manitoba. Her mother, Karen Bowler, was also a professor at the University of Manitoba; the pair spent a combined 60 years teaching at the institution. Kate grew up primarily in Winnipeg, Manitoba where she was raised in a Mennonite community. While her own family did not identify as such, she attended Mennonite youth groups and camps, experiences further detailed in the introduction of her book The Preacher's Wife. Kate Bowler met her now husband, Toban Penner, in high school; they married in 2002. In her post-secondary career, Bowler received her Bachelor of Arts at Macalester College in St Paul, Minnesota in 2002, and her Master of Arts in Religion at Yale Divinity School in 2005. In 2010, she completed her PhD at Duke University, with which she is currently affiliated. Her PhD work focuses on the history of the prosperity gospel in the United States.

== Personal life ==
Bowler identifies as a Christian. While raised in a Mennonite tradition, she now more closely aligns with an evangelical description or denomination, though she emphasizes that this label carries a different connotation in Canada compared to the United States. Bowler's ideological affiliation is a clear subject of her writing, which consistently explores the American Christian tradition, particularly the idea of the prosperity gospel.

In 2015, at age 35, Kate Bowler was diagnosed with stage IV colon cancer. In a 2018 appearance on NPR's "Fresh Air" with Terry Gross, she reads the preface of her book Everything Happens for a Reason: And Other Lies I've Loved (a memoir for which her illness was the basis). In this segment, she describes the transition from being "Married in my 20s, a baby in my 30s, I won a job at my alma mater straight out of graduate school. I felt breathless with the possibilities" to "moving from the crisis phase to the chronic illness management phase". Bowler's cancer is incurable but has been responsive to immunotherapy. Despite being given two years to live after receiving her diagnosis, Bowler celebrated her 45th birthday in June 2025.

Today, outside of the professional sphere, Kate Bowler lives in Durham, North Carolina, with her husband, Toban, and her son, Zach.

== Career ==
Dr. Kate Bowler is currently an associate professor of American religious history at Duke Divinity School in Durham, North Carolina.

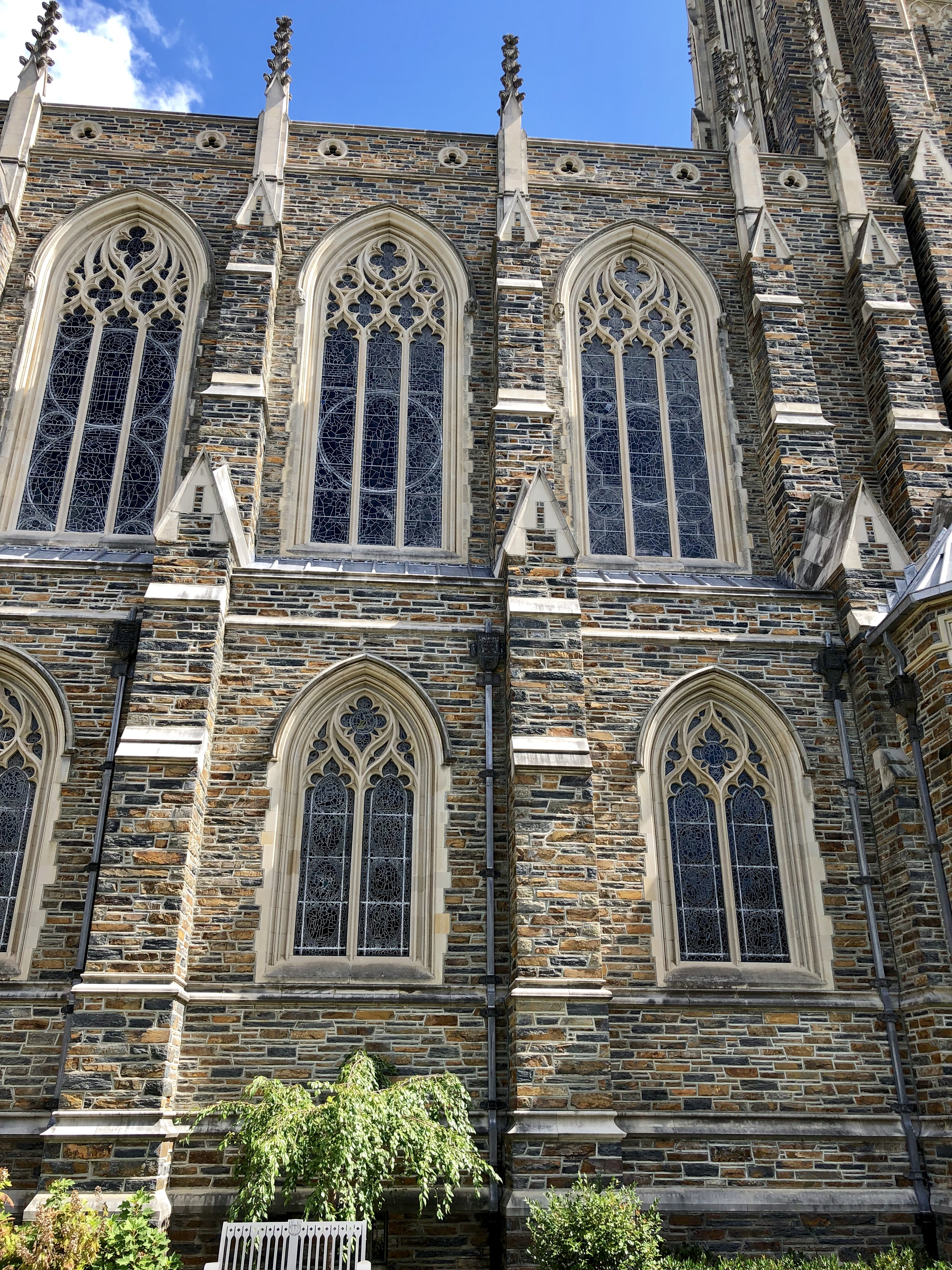
Duke Chapel on West Campus in Durham, North Carolina

Her chief research subject is the idea of the prosperity gospel, or prosperity theology. Bowler's publications on this topic have been featured in The New York Times, The New Republic, The Guardian, TIME Magazine, The Atlantic, The Economist, The Washington Post, NPR, and the BBC, among other outlets. In addition to journalistic highlighting, she has made additional personal appearances for TED, NPR, The TODAY Show, The New York Times, The Washington Post, and TIME Magazine. Her course list shares much with her writing, including titles such as "Everything Happens: Themes in American Religion" and "Donald Trump, TV Preachers, and the American Prosperity Gospel".

Bowler's academic work has received a variety of grants and awards; she is currently receiving support from the Lilly Endowment through 2026 for leadership education operations. Her contributions to the field of teaching earned her the 2022 Distinction in Theological Education Award from Yale Divinity School, an honorary degree from Macalester College in 2022, and an honorary Doctor of Letters from the University of Manitoba in 2025.

Within Duke Divinity School, alongside her faculty position, Bowler leads the "Everything Happens Project". This initiative is a multimedia location for spiritual conversation and research, highlighting narratives that often contradict the self-help industry's touted promises.

This umbrella project of "Everything Happens" is the source of journalism, conversation, newsletters, and Bowler's podcast entitled Everything Happens with Kate Bowler (produced by Lemonada media). On occasion, the subject matter discussed on air is supplemental to Bowler's independent research and course curriculum at Duke. Kate Bowler as host invites guests from a variety of careers and backgrounds to engage in everything from casual conversation to more personal, reflective questions about belief systems and life in general. The show has been running consistently since its initial season in 2018, and Bowler's team has produced over 270 episodes the past seven years. In addition to a host of other noteworthy individuals in their respective disciplines, notable guests in the year 2025 include:

- Tim Shriver, longtime chairman of the Special Olympics

- Melinda Gates, philanthropist and former chair of the Bill & Melinda Gates foundation

- Mike Krzyzewski (Coach K), Duke basketball coach responsible for five national championships

- Vivek Murthy, 19th and 21st surgeon general of the United States

== Book publications ==
Bowler's bookshelf includes a variety of genres, from adopted academic projects to casual prayer guides; all texts are available from most major retailers.

Blessed: A History of the American Prosperity Gospel. New York: Oxford University Press, 2013. ISBN 978-0-19-087673-9

Kate Bowler's first text, derived from her doctoral dissertation, covers a decade of travel across Canada and the United States. In these years, Bowler visited megachurches, archives, and various other evangelical events and interviewed church leaders in pursuit of exploring the "prosperity gospel". This theological notion, unique to the Charismatic Christian population, attributes worldly health and wealth to the will of God and commitment to religious practices.

A Publishers Weekly review describes this history and ideological scaffolding as a "rich narrative [that] traces the entanglement of prosperity and the divine in New Thought thinkers, who believed in mind-power to transform heaven-sent blessings; the power of positive thinking in the postwar era, from Norman Vincent Peale to the televangelists of the 1980s; and the rise of the contemporary megachurch, which includes preachers like Joel Osteen, who argue that believers are created to excel". Though critics note that in Blessed, Bowler "could expand her analysis of civil religion's influence on the prosperity gospel. The movement's expansion in the years of the Cold War and its emphasis on American exceptionalism beg for more discussion".

Everything Happens for a Reason: And Other Lies I've Loved. New York: Random House, 2018. ISBN 978-0-399-59207-2

Everything Happens for a Reason: And Other Lies I've Loved was published in 2018. This memoir chronicles Bowler's internal dialogue following her diagnosis with stage IV colon cancer, particularly her meditations on her area of academic focus, the prosperity gospel, and the ways in which it manifests in her life. Kirkus Reviews describes this synthesis as "a touching tale of battling cancer set against the backdrop of the prosperity gospel". Bowler discussed this book and offered further reflections and recommendations for an audience in her TED Talk, given on July 2, 2019. Bowler's website also offers discussion questions related to the book for readers looking to apply writing to their own lives and conversations.

The Preacher's Wife: The Precarious Power of Evangelical Women Celebrities. Princeton: Princeton University Press, 2020. ISBN 978-0-691-20919-7

Bowler's third full-length book observes women in American evangelist culture, specifically the wives of megachurch preachers. The text explores how these individuals "balance the demands of celebrity culture and conservative, male dominated faiths", providing a sympathetic lens through which to view these women. Published in 2020, this topic was also addressed in Bowler's New York Times Op-Ed, titled "The Perilous Power of the Preacher's Wife". While the book was generally received positively, the Christian Scholar's Review notes, "If I could have asked Bowler for more, I would have been glad if she had pondered the extent to which some of this material reflects evangelical history more generally".

No Cure for Being Human (And Other Truths I Need to Hear). Penguin, 2021. ISBN 978-0-593-23078-7

A New York Times bestseller, No Cure for Being Human continues the precedent set by Everything Happens, a shift from nonfiction portrayals of communities or schools of thought. In this work, Bowler continues to reflect on the intersection of her diagnosis alongside cultural analysis of the self-help industry. Accompanying discussion questions are also available for this book.

Good Enough: 40ish Devotionals for a Life of Imperfection. Harmony/Rodale/Convergent, 2022. ISBN 9780593193686

Released in 2022, this text was co-authored with Jessica Richie, the co-producer of Bowler's podcast and the executive director of the Everything Happens Project at Duke Divinity School. Both faculty at Duke Divinity School, these women created this reflection on finding beauty and truth in the chaotic moments of life. The text works as a counter to the "ruthless individualism and blind optimism" that its authors claim characterizes contemporary culture. Bowler spoke on this book in February 2022 on Good Morning America.

The Lives We Actually Have: 100 Blessings for Imperfect Days. Convergent Books, 2023. ISBN 978-0-593-19370-9

Richie and Bowler released this devotional on the heels of Good Enough in 2023. Rather than long-form prose, this book is similarly split into smaller blessings/meditations designed to elevate gratitude in the smaller or less glamorous moments of life. The Lives We Actually Have is formatted as a prayer text, with related guides available for lent and advent seasons.

Have a Beautiful, Terrible Day!: Meditations for the Ups, Downs, and In-Betweens. Harmony/Rodale/Convergent, 2024. ISBN 9780593727676

Composed in a season of chronic pain and cancer treatment, this book is a continuation of Bowler's recent writing of devotionals and smaller guides over inquiry-based research books. Each section offers a poem of sorts with an accompanying verse and action-oriented advice from Bowler. This publication also offers a lent guide.

Joyful, Anyway. Random House publishing Group, 2026. ISBN 9780593734193

Set to release April 7, 2026, Joyful, Anyway is Bowler's newest addition to her shelf. Bowler prefaces this book with gratitude for surviving her stage-four cancer diagnosis, claiming that her pursuit of joy after that fact inspired the idea for this text and its subject matter. The book is available for preorder from a variety of online retailers.

== Academic and journalistic publications ==
=== Journals, news outlets, and blog posts ===
- Bowler, K. (2021, August 28). Colon cancer bucket list. The New York Times. https://www.nytimes.com/2021/08/28/opinion/sunday/colon-cancer-bucket-list.html

- Bowler, K. (2019, October 12). Evangelical preachers, pastors and the politics of pain. The New York Times. https://www.nytimes.com/2019/10/12/opinion/sunday/evangelical-preachers-pastors.html

- Bowler, K. (2018, December 28). Resolutions of hope — Cancer, God and me. The New York Times. https://www.nytimes.com/2018/12/28/opinion/sunday/resolutions-hope-cancer-god.html

- Bowler, K. (2018, January 26). Cancer: What to say when hope falls short. The New York Times. https://www.nytimes.com/2018/01/26/opinion/sunday/cancer-what-to-say.html

- Bowler, K. (2016, February 14). Death, the prosperity gospel and me. The New York Times. https://www.nytimes.com/2016/02/14/opinion/sunday/death-the-prosperity-gospel-and-me.html

- Bowler, K. (2013). Believers in Bling: Behold, the Prosperity 'Preachers of L.A'. CNN Belief Blog.

=== Academic contributions (journals, book chapters, etc.) ===
- Bowler, K. (n.d.). Antinomianism. In Encyclopedia of the Bible and Its Reception. Berlin: Walter de Gruyter Publishing.

- Bowler, K. (2008). Dorothy Eugenia Rogers Tilly. In S. H. Lindley & E. J. Stebner (Eds.), Westminster Handbook to Women in American Religious History. Westminster: John Knox Press.

- Bowler, K. (2008). Eliza Hart Spalding. In S. H. Lindley & E. J. Stebner (Eds.), Westminster Handbook to Women in American Religious History. Westminster: John Knox Press.

- Bowler, K. (2008). Mary Magdalena Lewis Tate. In S. H. Lindley & E. J. Stebner (Eds.), Westminster Handbook to Women in American Religious History. Westminster: John Knox Press.

- Bowler, K. (2008). Matilda Thurston. In S. H. Lindley & E. J. Stebner (Eds.), Westminster Handbook to Women in American Religious History. Westminster: John Knox Press.

- Bowler, K. (2008). Women's Union Missionary Society. In S. H. Lindley & E. J. Stebner (Eds.), Westminster Handbook to Women in American Religious History. Westminster: John Knox Press.

- Bowler, K. (2009). "Generation K: Korean-American Evangelicals in the Second Generation," (review). Books and Culture.

- Bowler, K. (2009). "Global Pentecostalism: The New Face of Christian Social Engagement," (Review). Sociology of Religion.

- Bowler, K. (2010). Blessed Bodies: Prosperity as Healing within the African-American Faith Movement. In C. G. Brown (Ed.), in Global Pentecostal and Charismatic Healing. New York: Oxford University Press.

- Bowler, K. (2010). From Far and Wide: The Canadian Faith Movement. Church & Faith Trends.

- Bowler, K. (2010). Positive Thinking. In C. Lippy (Ed.), Encyclopedia of Religion in America. Washington: CQ Press.

- Bowler, K. (2011). French Canadian Immigrant Women. In H. R. Diner (Ed.), Encyclopedia of American Women's History. New York: Facts on File.

- Bowler, K., & Reagan, W. (2014). Bigger, Better, Louder: The Prosperity Gospel's Impact on Contemporary Christian Worship. Religion and American Culture: A Journal of Interpretation, 24(2), 186–230. https://doi.org/10.1525/rac.2014.24.2.186

- Bowler, K. (2015). Daily Grind: The Spiritual Workday of the American Prosperity Gospel. Journal of Cultural Economy, 8(5), 630–636. https://doi.org/10.1080/17530350.2014.982150

=== Awards and grants ===
- Grant awarded by the Louisville Institute (2015–2017) for a project entitled: "A History of Modern American Icon"
- Grant awarded by the Lilly Endowment (2018–2020) for a project entitled: "Everything Happens Project Planning"
- Grant awarded by the Richard J. Reynolds III and Marie Mallouk Reynolds Foundation (2019–2020) for a project entitled: "Everything Happens for a Reason - Reynolds"
- Grant awarded by the Duke Endowment (2020–2021) for a project entitled: "Equipping Pastors for the Digital Church - Everything Happens Project"
- Grant awarded by the Duke Endowment (2020–2023) for a project entitled: "Everything Happens for a Reason"
- Grant awarded by the Lilly Endowment (2020–2026) for a project entitled: "Leadership Education Operations"
- Recipient of the Christopher Award (LINK) (70th annual ceremony in 2019) for her memoir Everything Happens for a Reason: and Other Lies I've Loved; Books for adults' category
- 2022 Distinction in Theological Education Award from Yale Divinity School
- Four-time New York Times Bestselling author

== See also ==
- Beth Allison Barr
- Jessica Richie
- Terry Gross
- Beth Moore
- Joyce Meyer
- Victoria Osteen
- Tim Shriver
- Melinda Gates
- Mike Krzyzewski (Coach K)
- Vivek Murthy
