= Changing Your World =

1990 American television series

- Country of origin: United States

Original release
- Network: Syndication
- Release: 1990 – present

Changing Your World is a television series airing in syndication hosted by Creflo Dollar discussing issues such as family life, physical fitness, and spirituality. The show is filmed in College Park, Georgia, and has aired since 1990.
