= Jessica Richie =

American writer, podcaster, and academic

- Born: September 27, 1990 (age 36)

Academic background
- Education: Duke University

Jessica Richie (born September 27, 1990) is a writer based in Durham, North Carolina. Richie is currently the executive director of the Everything Happens Initiative at Duke University and the executive producer of the Everything Happens Podcast.

She is the co-author, with Kate Bowler, of the New York Times and USA Today best seller, Good Enough: 40ish Devotionals for a Life of Imperfection.
