= Walk Thru the Bible =

Walk Thru the Bible Ministries (WTB) is a non-denominational evangelical Christian educational organization headquartered in Atlanta, Georgia.

== Overview ==
Walk Thru the Bible was founded in the United States in 1976 by Bruce Wilkinson and Howard Hendricks. Its main purpose is to teach evangelical Christian biblical doctrines, primarily through an innovative seminar format, while providing additional resources through print, audio and video media productions. As a parachurch organization, Walk Thru the Bible works in cooperation with local churches who host and publicize the seminars to their congregations and surrounding communities.

The organization's non-traditional audience-participatory methodologies have resulted in rapid worldwide growth, with a WTB presence, by means of trained WTB seminar instructors, in over 90 countries. Borrowing from the business-world concept of the independent contractor or franchise, WTB trains "Associate Instructors" who then "manage their own local ministry" and interface with churches and private schools in their region to present the various WTB multimedia seminars.

WTB's original goal was to train and equip one instructor for every 50,000 people, in every country of the world. More recently, this goal has been augmented with an effort to establish instructors connected to local churches in 1,000 high-density cities in various countries. WTB is reported to have trained over 100,000 instructors.

After becoming a best-selling author, Wilkinson stepped down from leadership of WTB, and was succeeded as president by Chip Ingram in 2003. Ingram was later succeeded by Phil Tuttle, the current president.

== Awards ==
At the National Religious Broadcasters' 2007 Annual Media Awards, WTB won an award for "Best Ministry Website".

== See also ==
- The Prayer of Jabez
