= Enjoying Everyday Life =

- Also known as: Life in the Word with Joyce Meyer
- Presented by: Joyce Meyer; Dave Meyer; Ginger Stache
- Country of origin: United States

Production
- Running time: 30 minutes

Original release
- Network: Syndication; Trinity Broadcasting Network; BET
- Release: August 17, 1993 – present
- Network: Daystar Television Network
- Release: 2005 – January 10, 2025

Enjoying Everyday Life is an American Christian television and radio series hosted by Joyce Meyer and airing in syndication on numerous broadcast and cable television networks and on radio stations. Enjoying Everyday Life broadcasts worldwide to a potential audience of 4.5 billion people.

In 1993, her husband Dave suggested that they start a television ministry. Initially airing on superstation WGN-TV in Chicago and Black Entertainment Television (BET), her program, now called Enjoying Everyday Life, is still on the air today (WGNA, KHCE).

== Episodes ==
- 40 Things the Word Does for You - Parts 1 and 2
- Abide in Christ - John 15 Bible Study
- Agreeing with God
- Are You Resisting the Devil? - Parts 1 and 2
- The Basics of Life: Water, Food and Hope
- Battle Strategies to Renew Your Mind - Parts 1 and 2
- The Beauty of Generosity - Parts 1 and 2
- The Believer's Authority
- Blessed, Broken and Given - Parts 1 and 2
- Book of James Bible Study - Parts 1 through 8
- Breaking Free - Parts 1 and 2
- Breaking Free of Wilderness Mindsets - Parts 1 and 2
- Characteristics of a Perfect Heart - Parts 1 and 2
- Check Your Motives - Parts 1 and 2
- Classrooms of Hope
- Dare to Believe - Parts 1 and 2
- Defeating Giants - Parts 1 through 4
- Developing the Character Habits
- Developing Discipline and Self-Control - Parts 1 and 2
- Do What You Know To Do
- Don't Be Led by Your Head - Parts 1 and 2
- Embracing Every Season of your Life - Parts 1 and 2
- Ephesians Bible Study - Parts 1 through 4
- Ephesians 1 Bible Study
- Ephesians 2 Bible Study
- Ephesians 4 Bible Study - Parts 1 and 2
- Ephesians 5 Bible Study
- Ephesians 6 Bible Study - Parts 1 and 2
- Establishing Boundaries - Parts 1 and 2
- Every Day Trust and Belief in God's Word - Parts 1 and 2
- Facing the Storms of Life
- Faithfulness - Parts 1 and 2
- Finding Freedowm Through Facing Truth - Parts 1 and 2
- Five Ways to De-Stress - Parts 1 and 2
- Galatians Bible Study - Parts 1 through 4
- Get Your Hopes Up
- God Our Healer
- God, What Do You Want Me to Do? - Parts 1 and 2
- Godly Wisdom for Your Finances - Parts 1 and 2
- Grace for Difficult Situations - Parts 1 and 2
- Grief and Loneliness - Parts 1 through 4
- Has Your Get Up and Go Got Up and Gone? - Parts 1 and 2
- Having a Conversation with God
- Having a Patient Attitude
- Healing of the Soul - Parts 1 and 2
- The Heart of Israel
- Help for the Uptight - Parts 1 and 2
- Hope for Life
- How Faith Works - Parts 1 and 2
- How to Overcome Disappointment and Discouragement - Parts 1 and 2
- How to Stand Strong in Every Season of Life - Parts 1 and 2
- How to Win Your Battles - Parts 1 and 2
- How Your Mind Affects Your Outlook on Life - Parts 1 and 2
- How Your Mind Affects the World Around You - Parts 1 and 2
- I Will Not Fear - Parts 1 and 2
- I'm Saved! Now What?
- Impulsive Behavior - Parts 1 and 2
- Interrupting Satan's Plan
- It's Time to Flip Your Switch - Parts 1 and 2
- It's Time to Push - Parts 1 and 2
- Judgment and Criticism - Parts 1 and 2
- Keys to Breakthrough - Parts 1 through 4
- The Law of Gradual Growth - Parts 1 and 2
- Let God Fight Your Battles - Parts 1 and 2
- Letting Go of the Past
- A Life Worth Living - Parts 1 and 2
- Live2Love - Parts 1 and 2
- Living without Frustration
- The Lord's Prayer - Parts 1 and 2
- Love God, Yourself, and Others as You Live by Grace - Parts 1 and 2
- The Mercy of God - Parts 1 and 2
- Maintaining an Unselfish Attitude
- Making the Most of Your Time - Parts 1 and 2
- The Mouth - Parts 1 and 2
- My Favorite Scriptures - Parts 1 through 6
- The Name of Jesus
- Nine Attitudes That Keep You Happy - Parts 1 through 4
- Our Weaknesses
- Overcoming Depression
- No Parking at Any Time - Parts 1 and 2
- Parable of the Rich Young Fool - Parts 1 and 2
- The Parable of the Unforgiving Servant - Parts 1 and 2
- The Parables of Jesus: The Cost of Discipleship - Parts 1 and 2
- The Parables of Jesus: The Good Samaritan - Parts 1 and 2
- The Parables of Jesus: The Laborers in the Vineyard - Parts 1 and 2
- The Parables of Jesus: The Lost Son and the Elder Brother - Parts 1 and 2
- Personal Evangelism
- The Power and Promise of God's Word - Parts 1 and 2
- The Power of Serving Others
- The Power of Words - Parts 1 through 3
- Prayer
- Providing Refuge in Central America
- Psalm 23 - Parts 1 through 4
- The Pursuit of Joy and Enjoyment - Parts 1 and 2
- Put First Things First - Parts 1 and 2
- Receiving Emotional Healing - Parts 1 and 2
- Receiving from God
- Removing Critical Attitudes
- The Rewards of Serving God - Parts 1 and 2
- Right and Wrong Mindsets - Parts 1 through 4
- Romans 12 Bible Study
- Sharing Christ, Loving People
- Simple, Practical Changes with Real Results - Parts 1 through 6
- Simplify Your Life - Parts 1 and 2
- Six Things to Say on Purpose - Parts 1 and 2
- The Small Adjustment that Makes a Big Difference - Parts 1 and 2
- Soul Poisons and Antidotes - Parts 1 and 2
- A Spirit-Led Journey
- Stay Seated in God's Supernatural Rest - Parts 1 and 2
- Staying Strong - Parts 1 and 2
- Stress Management - Parts 1 and 2
- Suffering - Parts 1 and 2
- Taking Back What Belongs to You - Parts 1 and 2
- Taking Better Care of Yourself
- Taking Risks - Parts 1 and 2
- Tests We Encounter on the Way to Promotion - Parts 1 and 2
- Two Ways to Give - Parts 1 and 2
- Understanding and Overcoming Depression with Linda Mintle
- Understanding Your Emotions - Parts 1 and 2
- Unshakeable Trust - Parts 1 through 4
- The Value of Experience - Parts 1 and 2
- Victims of Suicide
- Victory Demands Self Control - Parts 1 and 2
- Watch Your Mouth - Parts 1 and 2
- Ways the Devil Deceives Us - Parts 1 through 4
- Ways to Resist the Devil - Parts 1 and 2
- Ways to Simplify Your Life
- What about Me?
- What is Faith and How Does It Work? - Parts 1 through 4
- What is Love?
- Who is God? - Parts 1 through 3
- Why is It Hard to Finish What You Start? - Parts 1 and 2
- You Belong to God - Parts 1 and 2
- You've Got What It Takes - Parts 1 and 2
- Your Words Affect Your Future - Parts 1 and 2
- Your Spiritual Health - Parts 1 and 2
