= Eddie Long =

American Baptist church pastor (1953–2017)

- Born: Eddie Lee Long; May 12, 1953; Charlotte, North Carolina, U.S.
- Died: January 15, 2017 (aged 63); Atlanta, Georgia, U.S.
- Education: North Carolina Central University; International College of Excellence
- Occupation: Pastor
- Years active: 1985–2017
- Employer(s): New Birth Missionary Baptist Church (1987–2017)
- Spouses: Dabara S. Houston (m. 1981; div. 1985) Vanessa Griffin (m. 1990; death 2017)
- Children: 4 Grandchildren = 3
- Awards: Trumpet Award

Eddie Lee Long (May 12, 1953 – January 15, 2017) was an American pastor who served as the senior pastor of New Birth Missionary Baptist Church, a megachurch in unincorporated DeKalb County, Georgia, from 1987 until his death in 2017.

When Long started as pastor for New Birth Church, there were 300 church members, which grew to 25,000. During this time, Long was a subject of a Senate investigation, concerning whether he personally profited from his church's tax-exempt status, which eventually ended without a finding of wrongdoing. Also, civil lawsuits were filed against him alleging sexual abuse of underage male members of his parish. Long denied wrongdoing through his attorneys, and privately settled the lawsuits out of court for undisclosed amounts.

== Early life and education ==
Long was born in Charlotte, North Carolina, on May 12, 1953, the son of the Rev. Floyd M. Long Jr. and Hattie Long. He attended North Carolina Central University in Durham, North Carolina, where he received a bachelor's degree in Business Administration in 1977.

Long then worked as a factory sales representative for the Ford Motor Corporation. He was fired after he submitted expense reports that included personal telephone calls.

Long claimed to hold a doctorate in "Pastoral Ministry" from the unaccredited International College of Excellence, which is not recognized by either the Council for Higher Education Accreditation or United States Department of Education, the two institutions responsible for recognizing educational accrediting institutions in the United States

== Ministry ==
Following his dismissal from Ford, he moved to Atlanta to study theology and became the pastor of a small Cedartown, Georgia church. In 1987, he became the pastor of New Birth Missionary Baptist Church, which at the time had around 300 members. Under Long, membership grew to 25,000. The church may be considered part of the Bapticostal movement.

In 1994, Long was given the title "bishop" in the Full Gospel Baptist Church Fellowship, a group of black Baptist churches that embraced charismatic practices. Long's sermons, writings and teachings emphasize a "chain of command" between certain superiors and subordinates characterized by "respect, submission and obedience".

Long saw the first link in the chain as being a man choosing to be respectful, submissive and obedient to God. A woman chooses to be respectful, submissive and obedient to her father or husband. To live otherwise is to be outside of the divinely established order, and will result in the loss of spiritual and natural benefits. Long was considered a preacher of the prosperity gospel who taught that his followers would be blessed with material wealth.

In 2008, he ended its partnership with the Full Gospel Baptist Church Fellowship.

== Career events ==
In 2006, Long was chosen by the family of Martin Luther King Jr. to host and officiate the funeral of Coretta Scott King, wife of the late civil rights movement pioneer. The event was attended by four Presidents, Jimmy Carter, George H. W. Bush, Bill Clinton and George W. Bush.

Long was a prominent supporter of George W. Bush's faith-based initiatives. His ministry received a million dollar grant from the U.S. Administration for Children & Families. Rev. Timothy McDonald suggested a link between Long's anti-gay activity and the grant saying "If you look at the black pastors who have come out with the faith-based money, they're the same ones who have come out with campaigns on the gay marriage issue."

On January 31, 2012, a video was released depicting a ceremony at New Birth Missionary Baptist Church wherein Messianic Jewish preacher Ralph Messer presented a Torah scroll to Long, wrapped him in it, and symbolically elevated him to a position of spiritual kingship before a cheering congregation. Some Jewish leaders objected and characterized the ceremony as disrespectful to the Jewish faith and traditions.

In 2008, Long donated $1 million to his alma mater, North Carolina Central University, to establish a professorship in his name, saying "I am making (the donation) from my own personal income," which comes from various real estate ventures and royalties from his books.

== Personal life ==
Long married Dabara S. Houston in 1981. They were divorced in 1985. The couple have a son, Edward Long. Houston said she was the victim of "cruel treatment" and was afraid of Long's "violent and vicious temper," according to Fulton County Superior Court records. She and her son allegedly "had to flee the couple's Fairburn home in order to ensure their safety". Long vigorously denied the allegations and in 1985 Houston was awarded custody of the then 2-year-old son.

Long married Vanessa Griffin in 1990. After he was accused of sexually molesting young fatherless boys in the church, she filed for divorce in December 2011. On the same day New Birth's public relations firm claimed that she had rethought her decision and would withdraw her petition: "Upon further prayerful reflection Vanessa Long is withdrawing the divorce petition." However Griffin's attorneys later confirmed that she would continue with the divorce.

In response, Long stated that he would be taking a leave of absence from his ministry in an attempt to save his marriage, and that "he needed time to take care of 'some family business.'" Later that month, New Birth Christian Academy, founded by Long, announced it was closing due to lack of donations and "sending hundreds of students scrambling to find a new school by the following week", in the wake of Long's marital and sexual problems.

On February 17, 2012, one of Long's lawyers, Lawrence Cooper, confirmed to the Atlanta-Journal-Constitution that Vanessa Long had asked that the divorce petition be dismissed. Cooper declined to say if the Longs were reunited. In an emailed response to the AJC, Vanessa's lawyers declined to comment. On September 5, 2012, during the Heart to Heart Women's Ministry Conference at New Birth, Vanessa Long stated that while she struggled with the decision to divorce Long following those accusations of sexual misconduct with male minors, she chose to return to her marriage and to the New Birth family so she could share her experience and offer guidance for others.

== Controversies ==
=== Salary and Senate investigation ===
In 2005, The Atlanta Journal-Constitution reported that between 1997 and 2000, Long received more than $3.07 million worth of compensation and benefits from his non-profit charity, 'Bishop Eddie Long Ministries Inc.' Long contended that the charity did not solicit donations from members but instead gained its income from royalties, speaking fees and several large donations. In 2007 a three-year investigation by the United States Senate Committee on Finance into the tax-exempt status of six ministries, including Long's, concluded that there were no definitive findings of wrongdoing. Donations to the church dropped significantly following the investigation of Long's salary and church finances.

=== Teaching regarding sexual orientation ===
CNN had stated that "Long frequently denounces homosexual behavior." Long had ministered "homosexual cure" programs to recruit homosexuals for what he called "Sexual Reorientation" conferences and his church offers an ongoing "Out of the Wilderness" ministry to convert homosexuals to heterosexuality.

In 2004, Long led a march with Bernice King to the grave of her father, Martin Luther King, Jr. The march was a protest against same-sex marriage and in support of a national constitutional amendment to limit marriage rights to couples comprising "one man and one woman."

In 2006, Long's appearance at Atlanta's Interdenominational Theological Center's spring graduation led to Black theologian James Cone—who was scheduled to receive an honorary degree—to boycott the ceremony. Thirty-three graduating seniors sent a letter to the seminary's president "questioning Long's theological and ethical integrity to be their commencement speaker." Many students did not agree with Long's beliefs that God can "deliver" homosexuals and his teachings on prosperity. A 2007 article in the Southern Poverty Law Center's magazine called him "one of the most virulently homophobic black leaders in the religiously based anti–gay movement."

=== Allegations of sexual impropriety and lawsuits ===
In September 2010, Maurice Robinson, Anthony Flagg, Jamal Parris and Spencer LeGrande filed separate lawsuits alleging that Long used his pastoral influence to coerce them into sexual relationships with him. The plaintiffs state that Long placed the men on the church's payroll, bought them cars and other gifts, including overseas trips.

The lawsuits stated that Long would "discuss the Holy Scripture to justify and support the sexual activity." Long denied the allegations through his attorneys and spokesman. In a prepared statement, Long said, "I have devoted my life to helping others and these false allegations hurt me deeply."

On September 26, Long spoke to the New Birth congregation but he did not address the issue directly. Long spoke of painful times and said, "I've been accused. I'm under attack. I want you to know, as I said earlier, I am not a perfect man, but this thing, I'm going to fight." Long's unwillingness to address the accusations directly prompted a group of over 70 people, headed by the pastor of a small church in South Carolina, to hold a protest rally on the steps of the Georgia state Capitol on October 31, 2010, calling for Long's resignation.

In May 2011, the lawsuits were settled out of court. The terms were undisclosed. Later on, media outlets indicated that Centino Kemp was the fifth accuser who also settled.

On May 30, 2011, an episode of the documentary series Sex Scandals In Religion aired on Canadian television network VisionTV. It took an investigative look at the allegations of inappropriate sexual behavior by Long with young men in his care.

== Weight loss and death ==
In August 2016, Long received major attention on Twitter when he posted a video on Facebook of himself showing his drastic weight loss. In the video, he said he was eating "raw vegetables" instead of a "slave menu" and that he was not on any medications.

In September 2016, Long issued a statement saying he was "recovering" from an unspecified illness and that the illness was "unrelated" to his diet.

Long died on January 15, 2017, at the age of 63. The church issued a statement describing the cause of death as an "aggressive form of cancer".

== Books ==
- Your Vision Is Too Small
- I Don't Want Delilah, I Need You!: What a Woman Needs to Know and what a Man Needs to Understand
- What a Man Wants, What a Woman Needs: The Secret to Successful, Fulfilling Relationships
- The Power of a Wise Woman
- Called to Conquer: A Daily Devotional to Energize and Encourage You in Word and Spirit
- Taking Over
- The Church: Living Without Love
- Gladiator: The Strength of a Man
- The Blessing in Giving
- Deliver Me From Adam
- 60 Seconds to Greatness: Seize the Moment and Plan for Success with Cecil Murphey
