= Simon Coleman (anthropologist) =

British anthropologist

Academic background
- Education: PhD, University of Cambridge

Simon Coleman FRSC is a British anthropologist who serves as a Chancellor Jackman Chaired Professor in the Department for the Study of Religion at the University of Toronto.

Coleman grew up in London, and was educated at University College School and St John's College, Cambridge, where he graduated with BA and PhD degrees in social anthropology. Prior to joining Toronto in 2010, he was a research fellow at St John's and taught at Durham University and Sussex University.

He has served as the editor of The Journal of the Royal Anthropological Institute. He has published studies of Charismatic Christianity and Prosperity theology, particularly focusing on the Word of Faith movement in Europe.

Coleman was elected a Fellow of the Royal Society of Canada in 2024 for his "pioneering work in the development of both the anthropology of Christianity and the study of urban forms of religious expression."
