= The Penny =

The Penny is a book authored by Joyce Meyer and Deborah Bedford. It was the first time either of the best-selling authors had co-authored a book. Although the book is fictional, it is based on the early life experiences of the co-author, Joyce Meyer, who was abused by her parents when she was a child. The novel was published by Hodder & Stoughton.

== Plot summary ==
The main character in the story is Jenny, a 14-year-old girl. Jenny and her sister are badly abused by their father. The book is religion based, and is about how Jenny comes to know Jesus through her best friend Aurelia. At the time the book is based, 1950, many people would have frowned upon Jenny, a white girl, becoming friends with a black skinned girl.

== Film ==
The book has been optioned for a movie, and Joyce has been quoted as being very excited about this; she hopes the film "will help people understand that God is available to everyone and works in our everyday life." The rights to create a film about the book were sold to Weinstein Company.
