= Joyce Meyer =

American author (born 1943)

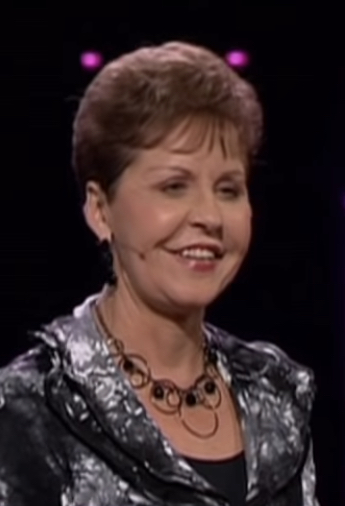
- Meyer speaking in 2015
- Born: Pauline Joyce Hutchison; June 4, 1943 (age 83); St. Louis, Missouri, U.S.
- Occupations: Bible teacher, author, speaker
- Spouse: Dave Meyer (m. 1967)
- Website: joycemeyer.org

Pauline Joyce Meyer (née Hutchison; June 4, 1943) is an American Charismatic Christian author, speaker, and president of Joyce Meyer Ministries. Her ministry is headquartered near the St. Louis suburb of Fenton, Missouri.

== Early life ==
Meyer was born Pauline Joyce Hutchison in South St. Louis, on June 4, 1943. Her father went into the army to fight in World War II the day she was born. She has said in interviews that he began sexually abusing her upon his return, and discusses this experience in her meetings.

A graduate of O'Fallon Technical High School in St. Louis, she married a part-time car salesman shortly after her senior year of high school. The marriage lasted five years. She maintains that her husband frequently cheated on her and persuaded her to steal payroll checks from her employer. They used the money to go on a vacation to California. She states that she returned the money years later. After her divorce, Meyer frequented local bars before meeting Dave Meyer, an engineering draftsman. They were married on January 7, 1967.

== Conversion and ministry ==
Meyer reports that during an intense prayer while driving to work one morning in 1976, she heard God call her name. She had been born again at age nine, but unhappiness drove her deeper into her faith. She got home later that day from a beauty appointment "full of liquid love" and was "drunk with the Spirit of God" that night while at the local bowling alley.

... I didn't have any knowledge. I didn't go to church. And I had a lot of problems, and I needed somebody to kind of help me along. And I think sometimes even people who want to serve God, if they have got so many problems that they don't think right and they don't act right and they don't behave right, they almost need somebody to take them by the hand and help lead them through the early years ...

Meyer was briefly a member of Our Savior's Lutheran Church in St. Louis, a congregation of the Lutheran Church–Missouri Synod. She began leading an early-morning Bible class at a local cafeteria and became active in Life Christian Center, a charismatic church in Fenton. Within a few years, Meyer was the church's associate pastor. The church became one of the leading charismatic churches in the area, largely because of her popularity as a Bible teacher. She also began airing a daily 15-minute radio broadcast on a St. Louis radio station.

In 1985, Meyer resigned as associate pastor and founded her own ministry, initially called "Life in the Word". She began airing her radio show on six other stations from Chicago to Kansas City.

In 1993, her husband, Dave, suggested starting a television ministry. Under the name "Life in the Word", it initially aired on superstation WGN-TV in Chicago and Black Entertainment Television (BET). In 1998, it was one of the first religious programs airing on KTBU which at that time was owned by Lakewood Church and Humanity Interested Media, Inc. Her program, now called Enjoying Everyday Life, is still on the air today.

In 2002, mainstream publisher Hachette Book Group paid Meyer over $10 million for the rights to her backlist catalog of independently released books.

In 2004, St. Louis Christian television station KNLC, operated by Larry Rice of New Life Evangelistic Center, dropped Meyer's programming. According to Rice, a longstanding Meyer supporter, Meyer's "excessive lifestyle" and her teachings "often going beyond Scripture" were the impetus for canceling the program.

In 2005 Meyer was listed in Time magazine's "25 Most Influential Evangelicals in America".

== Salary and finances ==
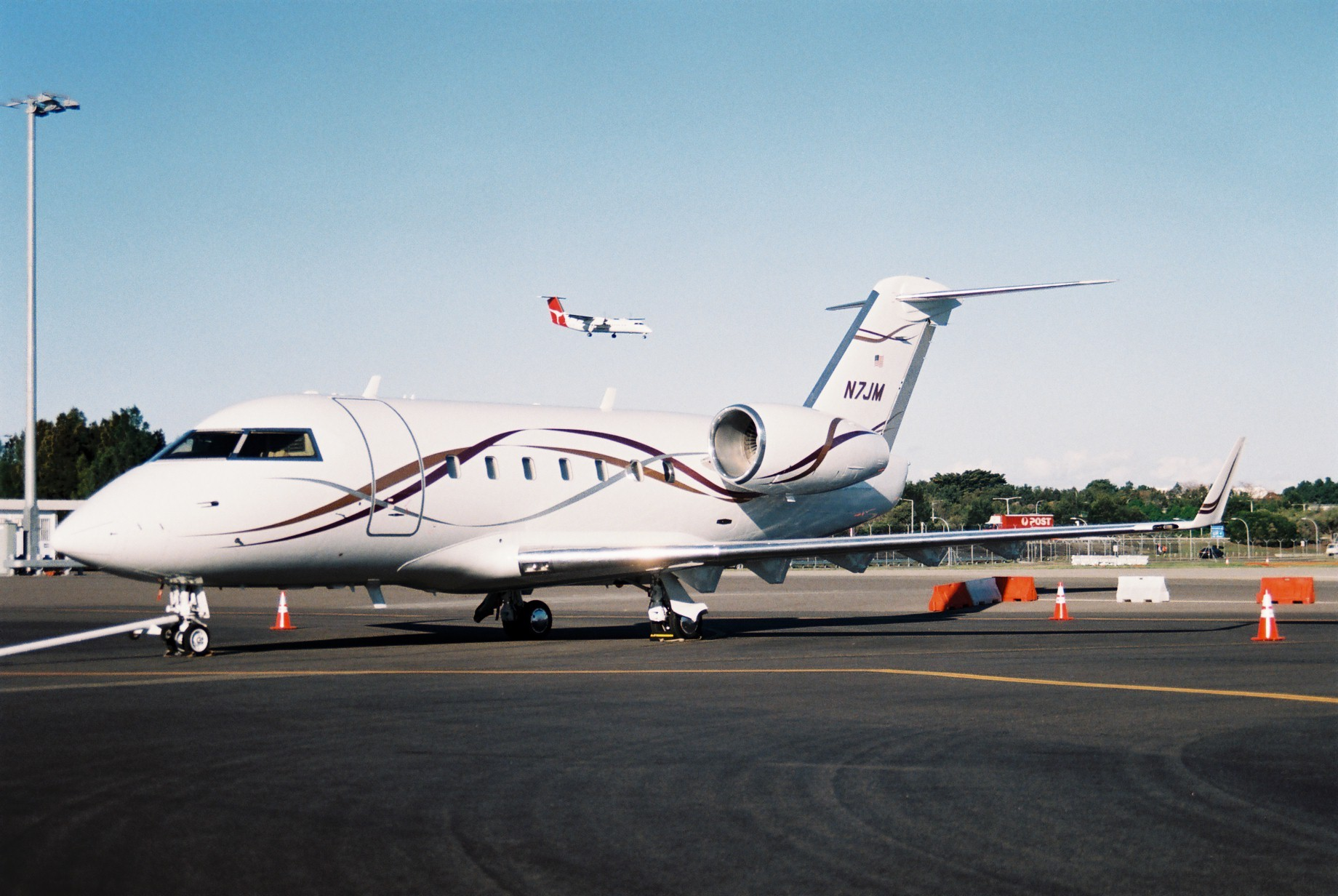
Joyce Meyer used to travel in this Canadair Challenger 600S; seen here in Sydney, Australia, when she was a 'special guest' at the Hillsong Conference in July 2005. It has since been replaced by a Gulfstream G-IV (serial number 1132)

Meyer, who owns several homes and travels in a private jet, has been criticized for living an excessive lifestyle. She does not defend her spending habits, saying "there's no need for us to apologize for being blessed." Meyer commented, "You can be a businessman here in St. Louis, and people think the more you have, the more wonderful it is ... but if you're a preacher, then all of a sudden it becomes a problem."

In November 2003, the St. Louis Post-Dispatch published a four-part special report detailing Meyer's "$10 million corporate jet, her husband's $107,000 silver-gray Mercedes sedan, her $2 million home and houses worth another $2 million for her four children", a $20 million headquarters, furnished with "$5.7 million worth of furniture, artwork, glassware, and the latest equipment and machinery", including a "$30,000 malachite round table, a $23,000 marble-topped antique commode, a $14,000 custom office bookcase, a $7,000 Stations of the Cross in Dresden porcelain, a $6,300 eagle sculpture on a pedestal, another eagle made of silver bought for $5,000, and numerous paintings purchased for $1,000 to $4,000 each", among many other expensive items – all paid for by the ministry. The articles prompted Wall Watchers (a Christian nonprofit watchdog group) to call on the Internal Revenue Service (IRS) to investigate Meyer and her family.

Following adverse publicity about her lifestyle and Ministry Watch's request for an IRS probe, Meyer in 2004 stated she planned to take a salary reduction from the $900,000 per year she had been receiving from Joyce Meyer Ministries (in addition to the $450,000 her husband received) and instead keep more of the royalties from her outside book sales which Meyer had previously donated back to Joyce Meyer Ministries. She now retains royalties on books sold outside the ministry through retail outlets such as Walmart, Amazon.com, and bookstores, while continuing to donate to her ministry royalties from books sold through her conferences, catalogues, website, and television program. "The net effect of all of this", notes Ministry Watch, "was most likely a sizable increase in the personal compensation of Joyce Meyer and reduced revenues for JMM". In an article in the St. Louis Business Journal, Meyer's public relations director, Mark Sutherland, confirmed that her new income would be "way above" her previous levels. Joyce Meyer Ministries says it has made a commitment to maintain transparency in financial dealings, publish their annual reports, have a Board majority who are not Meyer relatives and submit to a voluntary annual audit.

Joyce Meyer Ministries was one of six investigated by the United States Senate inquiry into the tax-exempt status of religious organizations by Senator Chuck Grassley. The inquiry sought to determine if Meyer made any personal profit from financial donations, asking for a detailed accounting for such things as cosmetic surgery and foreign bank accounts. Joyce Meyer Ministries was one of two ministries to comply with the Senate's requests for financial records. It also made commitments to future financial transparency. Neither of the ministries were found to have committed any wrongdoing.

=== ECFA accreditation ===
In 2009, Joyce Meyer Ministries received accreditation from the Evangelical Council for Financial Accountability (ECFA).

== 2011 wrongful death lawsuit ==
On May 5, 2009, Christopher Coleman, the chief of security of Joyce Meyer Ministries, was arrested on suspicion of murder after police discovered the bodies of Coleman's wife, Sheri Coleman, and two sons at their residence, all three persons having died of apparent strangulation. On May 10, 2011, after a lengthy trial, Christopher Coleman was found guilty of three counts of first-degree murder and was sentenced to three life sentences. According to the prosecuting attorney Kris Reitz, the murders were committed as part of a premeditated plan to leave his wife for another woman with whom he had been having an affair. According to Reitz, Coleman was concerned that if his extra-marital affair were made public it would result in him losing his job at Joyce Meyer Ministries, likening his situation to that of King David killing Bathsheba's husband to hide their adultery. It also recalled the Brazilian case of Flordelis dos Santos de Souza who murdered her husband as an alternative way to avoid getting divorced, which would risk losing charisma and name among evangelicals. Meyer provided prerecorded testimony during Coleman's criminal trial.

The family of Sheri Coleman filed a wrongful-death lawsuit against Joyce Meyer Ministries claiming that the deaths of the three were the result of Meyer's negligence as a counselor. According to the suit, Christopher Coleman had anonymously sent several threatening letters to his family as a way to remove suspicion from himself for the murder. The suit also alleged that as counselor for both Christopher and Sheri Coleman, Meyer should have had reasonable suspicion that the letters were sent by Coleman and should have warned Sheri. The suit was dismissed by Circuit Judge Richard Aguirre in 2013.

== Charitable activities ==
In the autumn of 2000, Meyer established an inner-city church and social services program called the "Dream Center" to offer community outreach. Meyer's ministry says that they have donated to 50 international Christian charities.

The world missions arm of Meyer's ministry, Hand of Hope, has aided in the construction of clean-water wells and assisted victims of sex trafficking. Since 2012, Hand of Hope has provided financial support for Convoy of Hope, an organization that builds energy-efficient tornado-resistant houses for victims of tornadoes.

== Selected bibliography ==
- Beauty for Ashes: Receiving Emotional Healing. 1994. ISBN 0-892-74679-3.
- Battlefield of the Mind: Winning the Battle in Your Mind. 1995. ISBN 0-446-69109-7.
- Me and My Big Mouth: Your Answer is Right Under Your Nose. 2002. ISBN 0-446-69107-0.
- How to Hear from God: Learn to Know His Voice and Make Right Decisions. 2003. ISBN 0-446-53256-8.
- The Secret Power of Speaking God's Word. 2004. ISBN 0-446-57736-7.
- In Pursuit of Peace: 21 Ways to Conquer Anxiety, Fear, and Discontentment. 2004. ISBN 0-446-53195-2.
- Straight Talk: Overcoming Emotional Battles with the Power of God's Word. 2005. ISBN 0-446-57800-2.
- Approval Addiction: Overcoming Your Need to Please Everyone. 2005. ISBN 0-446-57772-3.
- Meyer, Joyce (2006). Look Great, Feel Great: 12 Keys to Enjoying a Healthy Life Now. Warner Faith. ISBN 0-446-57946-7.
- The Everyday Life Bible: The Power of God's Word for Everyday Living. 2006. ISBN 0-446-57827-4.
- The Confident Woman: Start Today Living Boldly and Without Fear. 2007. ISBN 0-446-53198-7.
- The Penny: A Novel. 2007. ISBN 0-446-57811-8. (by Joyce Meyer and Deborah Bedford)
- Woman to Woman: Candid Conversations from Me to You. 2007. ISBN 0-446-58180-1.
- I Dare You: Embrace Life With Passion. 2007. ISBN 0-446-53197-9.
- The Power of Simple Prayer: How to Talk with God about Everything. 2007. ISBN 0-446-53196-0.
- Top 10 Qualities of a Great Leader. 2007. ISBN 1-57794-913-7. (by Joyce Meyer and Phil Pringle)
- Conflict Free Living: How to Build Healthy Relationships for Life. 2008. ISBN 1-59979-062-9.
- Start Your New Life Today: An Exciting New Beginning with God. 2008. ISBN 0-446-50965-5.
- The Secret To True Happiness: Enjoy Today, Embrace Tomorrow. 2008. ISBN 0-446-53199-5.
- Never Give Up!: Relentless Determination to Overcome Life's Challenges. 2009. ISBN 0-446-58035-X.
- Eat the Cookie ... Buy the Shoes: Giving Yourself Permission to Lighten Up. 2010. ISBN 0-446-53864-7.
- Power Thoughts: 12 Strategies to Win the Battle. 2010. ISBN 0-446-58036-8.
- Living Beyond Your Feelings: Controlling Emotions So They Don't Control You. 2011. ISBN 0-446-53852-3.
- Love Out Loud: Devotions on Loving God, Yourself, and Others. 2011. ISBN 0-446-53847-7.
- Do Yourself a Favor ... Forgive: Learn How to Take Control of Your Life Through Forgiveness. 2012. ISBN 0-446-54727-1.
- Change Your Words, Change Your Life: Understanding the Power of Every Word You Speak. 2012. ISBN 0-446-53857-4.

== See also ==
- Prosperity theology
- Word of Faith
