= Carter Lindberg =

American historian (1937–2024)

Carter Lindberg (1937 – April 8, 2024) was an American historian. He was Professor Emeritus of Church History at Boston University School of Theology and is best known for his book The European Reformations.

Lindberg studied at Augustana College, the Lutheran School of Theology at Chicago, and the University of Iowa. He died on April 8, 2024.
