= The Prayer of Jabez =

Book by Bruce Wilkinson

- Author: Bruce Wilkinson
- Series: BreakThrough
- Genre: Religion
- Publisher: Multnomah Books
- Publication date: 2000

The Prayer of Jabez: Breaking Through to the Blessed Life is a book by Bruce Wilkinson published in 2000 by Multnomah Books as the first book in the "BreakThrough" book series. It is based on the Old Testament passage 1 Chronicles 4:9–10:

Jabez was more honorable than his brothers. His mother had named him Jabez, saying: "I gave birth to him in pain." Jabez cried out to the God of Israel, saying: "Oh that You would bless me indeed and enlarge my territory! Let Your hand be with me, and keep me from the evil one." And God granted his request.

— NIV

In the book, Wilkinson encourages Christians to invoke this prayer for themselves on a daily basis:

I challenge you to make the Jabez prayer for blessing part of the daily fabric of your life. To do that, I encourage you to follow unwaveringly the plan outlined here for the next thirty days. By the end of that time, you'll be noticing significant changes in your life, and the prayer will be on its way to becoming a treasured, lifelong habit.

The book became an international bestseller, topping the New York Times bestseller list and selling over nine million copies by 2002.

The book has also been criticized and compared to the prosperity gospel.

== Background, popularity, and impact ==
Wilkinson, an American Evangelical pastor, had preached sermons on the topic and in 2000 asked Multnomah Books to publish his pocket-sized Prayer of Jabez prior to the National Day of Prayer. The book sold a record eight million copies in its first year of publication and was the bestselling nonfiction book of 2001. It was on The New York Times Best Seller List for 94 weeks. The Prayer of Jabez received the Evangelical Christian Publishers Association Gold Medallion Book of the Year award in 2001.

The prayer, after being popularized by the book, "found its way into...House committee hearings on Capitol Hill" by 2001. Wilkinson was invited to the National Day of Prayer by President George W. Bush the same year.

== Derivative works and merchandise ==
The popularity of the original book has led its publisher, Multnomah Press, to expand it into a line of derivative works and products for niche audiences, as well as to offer the books in audio and video formats. They also authorized a wide array of official "Prayer of Jabez" merchandise including keychains, mugs, backpacks, Christmas ornaments, scented candles, mousepads and a framed artist's conception of Jabez himself. A line of jewelry was introduced in 2002. specific products include:

- Three versions rewritten for children, one each targeted at preschoolers, 8–12 year olds, and teens
- The Prayer of Jabez Journal
- The Prayer of Jabez Devotional (one edition for children, one for adults)
- The Prayer of Jabez Bible Study
- The Prayer of Jabez for Women (written by Wilkinson's wife, Darlene)
- The Prayer of Jabez Music ... A Worship Experience (a musical companion produced by ForeFront Records)
- The Healing of Jabez by John W. Mauck (2009, Credo House Publishers, ISBN 978-1-935391-29-6)

== Criticism ==
Jabez's approach has been critiqued by both Christian and secular media. Some Christian critiques have compared it to the Pentecostal prosperity gospel, and state it suggests God will obey people's wishes. Critics including Forbes and The Christian Century have made references to Santa Claus, commenting on the book's apparent "Santa-fication of God". Similarly, Newsweek argued Wilkinson "has turned this prayer into a Christian mantra".

Others, such as Evangelical author Berit Kjos, have taken issue with the form of the prayer, citing Jesus' admonition against "vain repetitions" in Matthew 6:7–9.

The Prayer of Jabez became very popular within sections of the fundamentalist Pentecostal Christian movement, particularly in churches associated with the New Apostolic Reformation, Kingdom Now theology, Dominion theology, Five-fold ministry thinking and other parts of the Spirit-filled Christianity movement.

The concept was critiqued by The Christian Century as "markedly individualistic and insulating". A 2001 review in The New Republic referred to the book as "in many ways, the ultimate anti-self-help book" in that it encourages readers to rely entirely on God as there is "no inner power or strength that we must struggle to tap."

Several works critiquing the Prayer of Jabez have been released. The Mantra of Jabez: A Christian Parody by Douglas M. Jones (Canon Press, ISBN 1-885767-88-9) was published in 2001. The Cult of Jabez... and the falling away of the church in America, a book alleging an unbiblical premise of Wilkinson's book, reached as high as number 77 on Amazon's top 100 books list in 2002. The Jabez You Never Knew: Hebraic Keys to Answered Prayers, by Norm Franz, was written to give historic context to the account of Jabez, and to criticize Wilkinson's book as emphasising rote prayer. Recording artist Derek Webb said that his controversial song "Wedding Dress" was written after he saw Wilkinson speak about The Prayer of Jabez. The Ceili Rain satirical song "Gold God" also takes issue with this concept (if not the book), noting the God who "expanded my territory" is "like a Visa card".
