= Bruce Wilkinson =

American evangelist

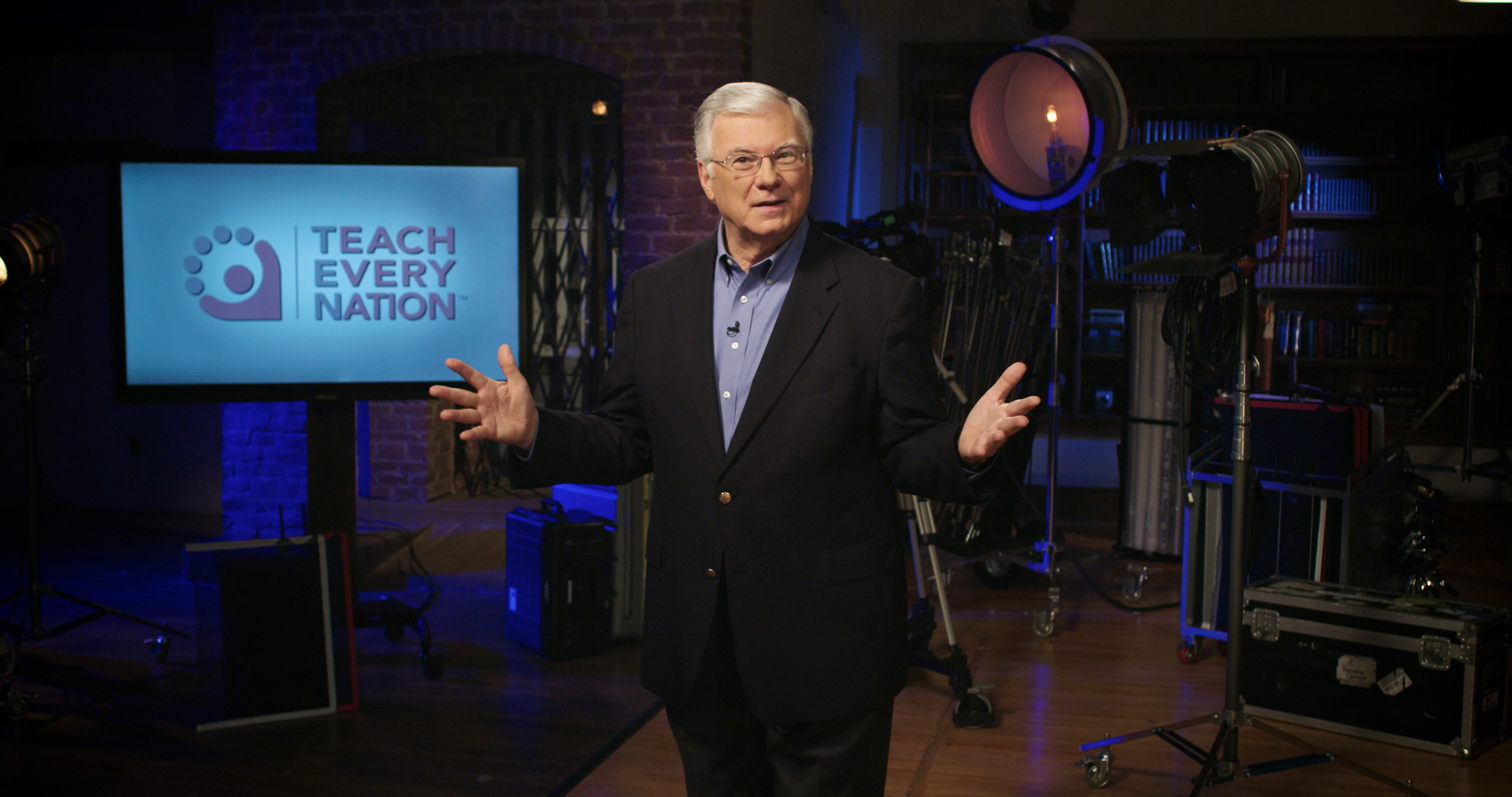
Bruce Wilkinson speaking

Bruce Wilkinson is an American Christian preacher, speaker and writer best known for his book The Prayer of Jabez. He also founded Walk Thru the Bible, an evangelical Christian educational organization, with Howard Hendricks, as well as Teach Every Nation, an Evangelical parachurch organization.

== Biography ==
=== Early life and education ===
Wilkinson was born in New Jersey to Joan and James Wilkinson. He graduated from Northeastern Bible College with a B.A. and Th. B., Dallas Theological Seminary (Th. M.) and Western Conservative Baptist Seminary (D.D.).

=== Career ===
Wilkinson started his career as a college professor at Multnomah School of the Bible in Portland, Oregon.

In 1976, he launched "Walk Thru the Bible.” He also launched and led WorldTeach.

After the dissolution of the Soviet Union in December 1991, Wilkinson traveled to Russian Federation to teach, in conjunction with screening the 1979 Jesus film. He worked as chairman of Co-Mission, an education ministry in Russia until 1996.

Wilkinson also produced a film on AIDS called Beat the Drum.

In 2002, Wilkinson and his family moved to South Africa, and founded an organization called "Dream For Africa". As part of this new project, he launched "Heart for Africa", which mobilized volunteers to plant backyard vegetable gardens for orphans and people living with hunger. He also launched a movement to recruit college students to conduct AIDS training in high schools.

Wilkinson founded "Teach Every Nation" (TEN) in 2013. TEN was formed to provide "innovative, practical and culturally relevant training" for pastors and leaders in the global South. Training is provided through simulcasts and in-person courses on TEN's training campus located in the Waterberg Biosphere of northern South Africa.

Wilkinson's ministries have also reached Eswatini, whose King, Mswati III, he unsuccessfully tried to meet in the early 2000s, leading to his return to the United States.

Wilkinson has also served as the chairman of the board of the Exponential Group.

== Books ==
Wilkinson has written over 70 books, including;

- Victory Over Temptation
- Walk Through the Bible
  - Youthwalk Again ISBN 0-310-54601-X
- The Wilkinson & Boa Bible Handbook ISBN 0-7852-4864-1, ISBN 0-7852-4903-6
- Talk Through The Bible ISBN 0-8407-5286-5
  - Talk Through the Old Testament
  - Talk Through the New Testament
  - Talk Through Bible Personalities ISBN 0-9612142-0-1
- 7 Laws of the Learner ISBN 0-88070-464-0
- Almost Every Answer for Practically Any Teacher! ( winner, 1993 Gold Medallion Book Awards for Christian Education) ISBN 0-88070-473-X
- Personal Holiness in Times of Temptation ISBN 1-56507-943-4
- Experiencing Spiritual Breakthroughs (based on his “The Three Chairs” seminar) ISBN 1-57673-536-2
- 30 Days to Spiritual Breakthroughs ISBN 1-57673-977-5
- The Prayer of Jabez (October 2000) ISBN 1-57673-733-0
  - Living the Jabez Miracle
  - The Prayer of Jabez for Young Hearts ISBN 0-613-96871-9
  - The Prayer of Jabez for Little Ones (with Melody Carlson) ISBN 0-8499-7943-9
  - The Prayer of Jabez for Kids (with Melody Carlson) ISBN 0-8499-7944-7
- Secrets of the Vine (October 2001) ISBN 1-57673-975-9
  - Secrets of the Vine for Little Ones ISBN 1-4003-0052-5
  - Secrets of the Vine for Kids ISBN 1-4003-0053-3
  - Secrets of the Vine for Teens (March 2003) ISBN 1-57673-922-8
- A Life God Rewards (October 2002) ISBN 1-57673-976-7
  - A Life God Rewards for Teens (October 2002) ISBN 1-59052-077-7
  - A Life God Rewards for Kids ISBN 1-59052-095-5
- Set Apart ISBN 1-59052-071-8
- 30 Days to Discovering Personal Victory Through Holiness ISBN 1-59052-070-X
- The Dream Giver (October 2003) ISBN 1-59052-201-X
  - The Dream Giver for Parents (September 2004) ISBN 1-59052-455-1
- Beyond Jabez ISBN 1-59052-367-9
- You Were Born for This ISBN 978-1-60142-182-1
- The Freedom Factor

Wilkinson served on the overview committee for the New King James Version (NKJV) of the Bible, as well as writing notes for the Open Bible.

He is also executive editor of four Bibles including The Daily Walk Bible (NIV, NLT, NKJV, RSV), The Closer Walk New Testament (NIV), The Youth Walk Bible (NIV), and The Family Walk Bible (NIV).
