= Creflo Dollar =

American pastor (born 1962)

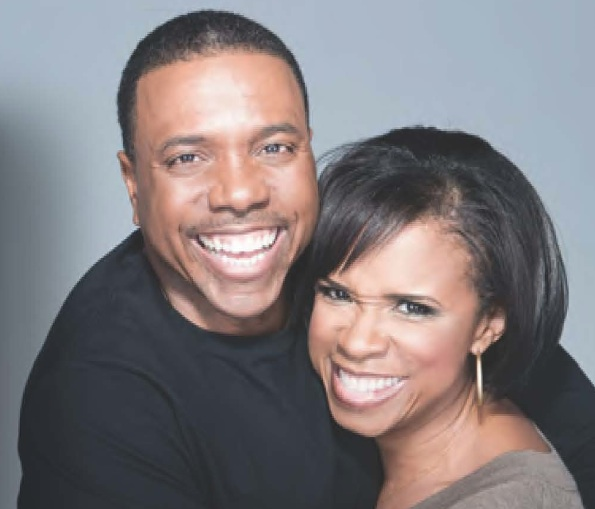
- Dollar with wife Taffi Dollar
- Born: January 28, 1962 (age 64); College Park, Georgia, U.S.
- Education: West Georgia College
- Occupation: Televangelist
- Years active: 1986–present
- Spouse: Taffi Dollar
- Children: 5
- Website: worldchangers.org

Creflo Augustus Dollar Jr. (born January 28, 1962) is an American pastor, televangelist, and the founder of the non-denominational World Changers Church International (WCCI), based in College Park, Georgia. He is the head of Creflo Dollar Ministries and the Creflo Dollar Ministerial Association.

For much of his career, Dollar has been a prominent figure in the Word of Faith movement, known for teaching prosperity theology. However, in the 2010s, his ministry shifted focus toward what he terms the "Gospel of Grace." In 2022, Dollar garnered significant public attention for formally retracting his long-held teachings on mandatory tithing, stating that the practice is not required for New Testament believers.

Dollar's ministry has a global reach through his television program, Changing Your World. He has frequently been the subject of public scrutiny and criticism regarding his personal wealth and the financial transparency of his ministry.

== Ministry career ==
Dollar began his ministry in 1986, holding the first worship service of World Changers Ministries Christian Center in the cafeteria of Kathleen Mitchell Elementary School in College Park, Georgia, with eight people in attendance. The congregation grew rapidly, eventually renamed World Changers Church International (WCCI).

In December 1995, the ministry moved into its current headquarters, the "World Dome," an 8,500-seat facility which the church states was built for nearly $20 million without bank financing. As of 2007, the congregation reported approximately 30,000 members. In October 2012, the ministry expanded to New York, leasing the Loews Paradise Theater in The Bronx for a satellite location.

Dollar's teachings are disseminated globally through his daily television broadcast, Changing Your World, and various publishing ventures under Arrow Records and Creflo Dollar Ministries.

== Personal life ==
Dollar and his wife Taffi have five children and reside in Atlanta, Georgia.

In June 2012, Dollar was arrested for an alleged attack on his fifteen-year-old daughter, according to the Fayette County, Georgia, Sheriff's Office. Dollar was accused of choking and punching the girl, a story corroborated by Dollar's older daughter, and Fayette County police released details of a subsequent 911 call. The charges were dropped in January 2013 after he attended anger management classes.

== Controversies and public scrutiny ==
=== Financial transparency and lifestyle ===
Dollar has frequently been criticized for living a lavish lifestyle while leading a tax-exempt religious organization. He owns multiple high-end properties, including real estate in Atlanta and New Jersey. He previously owned a Manhattan apartment, purchased for $2.5 million in 2006 and sold for $3.75 million in 2012. He has also been criticized for the ownership of luxury vehicles, including two Rolls-Royces.

Ministry Watch, an independent organization that reviews Christian ministries, previously awarded Creflo Dollar Ministries an "F" grade for financial transparency because the ministry declined to disclose financial information to independent audit.

=== 2007 Senate Finance Committee investigation ===
In 2007, Dollar was one of six televangelists investigated by U.S. Senator Chuck Grassley of the Senate Finance Committee regarding the personal use of church-owned assets. Dollar contested the probe, arguing that the IRS, not the Senate Committee, was the proper entity to examine religious groups. He was among the pastors who did not cooperate fully with the committee. The investigation concluded in 2011 with no penalties or charges filed, though the committee issued a report criticizing the lack of financial accountability in the ministries.

=== 2012 arrest and dismissal ===
In June 2012, Dollar was arrested by the Fayette County, Georgia, Sheriff's Office following an alleged domestic dispute with his then-15-year-old daughter. He was accused of simple battery and cruelty to children. Dollar denied the allegations. The charges were dismissed in January 2013 after Dollar successfully completed a court-ordered anger management program.

=== 2015 private jet campaign ===
In May 2015, Dollar faced backlash after his ministry launched a fundraising campaign for a Gulfstream G650 private jet, estimated to cost $65 million. The campaign was launched after his previous jet was involved in a runway accident in London in 2014. In response to critics, Dollar stated in a sermon, "If I want to believe God for a $65 million plane, you cannot stop me." The project drew widespread media criticism regarding the necessity of such an expensive aircraft for ministry work.

== Theology and teachings ==
Dollar's theological focus has evolved significantly over his career. He is widely recognized as a proponent of the Word of Faith movement and prosperity theology, which teaches that financial blessing and physical well-being are the will of God for Christians and that faith, positive speech, and donations to religious causes can increase one's material wealth.

=== "Gospel of Grace" ===
In the 2010s, Dollar began emphasizing a theology he refers to as the "Gospel of Grace". This teaching focuses on the "finished work of Christ", arguing that righteousness is a gift from God rather than a result of human works or adherence to religious law.

=== Retraction of tithing views ===
For decades, Dollar taught that tithing (giving 10% of one's income) was a mandatory obligation for Christians, often linking the practice to financial blessing. However, in a June 26, 2022, sermon titled "The Great Misunderstanding", Dollar publicly renounced these teachings. He stated, "I want to start off by saying to you, I’m still growing, and the teachings that I’ve shared in times past on the subject of tithing were not correct." He argued that tithing is an Old Testament law that is not binding on believers under the New Covenant, instead advocating for giving based on the believer's heart and ability. He advised his congregation to "throw away every book, every tape, and every video I ever did on the subject of tithing".

== See also ==
- Kenneth Copeland
- Joel Osteen

== Selected bibliography ==
Dollar has authored numerous books, including:

- Uprooting the Spirit of Fear (1994) ISBN 978-0892746866
- The Anointing to Live (1997) ISBN 978-1885072108
- Understanding God's Purpose for the Anointing (2001) ISBN 978-0963478108
- The Holy Spirit, Your Financial Advisor (2013) ASIN B00ELLC9NK
- Overcoming Fear (2018) ISBN 978-1599442396
