= The Faith Healers =

1987 book by James Randi

- "Cover" of the e-book edition
- Author: James Randi (Foreword by Carl Sagan)
- Cover artist: Travis Dick (e-book)
- Publisher: James Randi Educational Foundation
- Publication date: 24 Aug 2011 (e-book)
- Media type: E-book
- Text: The Faith Healers at Internet Archive

The Faith Healers is a 1987 book by conjurer and skeptic James Randi. In this book, Randi documents his exploration of the world of faith healing, exposing the tricks that religious con artists use in their healing shows to fool the audience. Randi's expertise in performing stage magic and mentalism allowed him to easily identify the same techniques when used by con artists. Randi analyzes the methods used by A. A. Allen, Ernest Angley, Willard Fuller, WV Grant, Peter Popoff, Oral Roberts, Pat Robertson, Ralph DiOrio and others, exposing their tricks. Popoff was dramatically exposed as a fraud by Randi on The Tonight Show Starring Johnny Carson. Randi expended considerable effort contacting people who were supposedly cured by these faith-healers. He found there was a lot of disappointment and not a single verifiable case of healing. Randi describes the "calling out trick," the "wheelchair trick," the "leg-stretching trick," the "how many fingers trick," the "shotgun technique," as well as methods used to gain personal information about potential victims in the audience. He also describes methods used, often by mail, to convince people to make large donations.

Randi also examines claims of miracles at holy sites such as at the Sanctuary of Our Lady of Lourdes again finding fraud and no verifiable cases of healing.

Prior to turning his attention to faith healing, Randi spent many years exposing fraud by psychics and mediums such as the famous Uri Geller. An updated edition of this book was released in 1989, and an e-book edition was released in 2011.

== Contents and synopsis of the e-book edition ==
The information in the book, summarized below, was correct when the book was originally published in 1987, except information in the update section which was correct when that was first published in 1989. Many of the faith healers discussed in the book have Wikipedia pages which may have more up to date information on their activities. These pages can be accessed by clicking on their names, when highlighted, in the synopsis below. Some have died since the book was written; reference to these individuals matches Randi's depiction in the book.

=== Foreword ===
The foreword is written by Carl Sagan, author of numerous science books for the general public, creator of the Cosmos television series about the mysteries of the universe, promoter of the SETI program to search for scientific evidence of extraterrestrial life, and author of over 600 scientific papers (see his Wikipedia page). Sagan starts off discussing Hippocrates and his success in promoting the scientific method in medicine. He points out the difficulty in getting people to view disease rationally, especially in regards to medically incurable diseases, leaving them vulnerable to people who falsely claim to be able to cure for their personal gain. Sagan characterizes Randi as "fearless, angry, anecdotal, crotchety, and ecumenically offensive"; he describes the book as a tirade; but, he says, "We ignore him at our peril."

=== Introduction ===
James Randi worked for 40 years as a professional conjurer, e.g. a performer of stage magic. Having seen all the tricks, he became an expert at detecting fakery and was able to apply this knowledge to examine claims about the occult, supernatural, and paranormal. He later turned his expertise to claims about faith healing which led to the publication of this book. For a time he and his colleagues followed various well known faith healers around the country, recording their activities. As a result, they were the first investigators to expose the faith healing racket. He notes that in spite of the extensive evidence they had gathered, law enforcement failed to act. Philosopher Paul Kurtz defines three types of faith: intransigent faith which is unaffected by any sort of contrary evidence, willful belief which is choosing to believe with little or no evidence either way, and hypotheses based on evidence. Randi comments that probably only those in the third category are likely to be persuaded to change their minds. He goes on to discuss the "Freireich experimental plan (FEP)" which was first described by Emil J. Freireich, as an illegitimate experimental method that allows ineffective medical treatments including faith healing to appear to be effective even if the patient gets worse or dies.

=== The origins of faith healing ===
Many religions have a history of faith healing with holy objects. The Roman Catholic Church in particular has saved thousands of relics of saints (clothing, bone fragments, etc.) that are supposed to have healing powers. Beginning in the early 1300s, European royalty claimed to have the ability to heal by touching. In the 1500s, Christian reformer Martin Luther took credit for miraculous cures. In the 1600s, a practitioner called Valentine Greatrakes claimed to be able to cure a variety of diseases and acquired a large following. Many tombs and shrines were claimed to have curative powers. Lourdes in particular became a pilgrimage site for those in need of a cure. Established in 1876, it receives 5 million visitors annually. Although it is claimed that 30,000 are healed every year, only 64 in total were accepted as "miracles" by the Catholic Church. Lacking any proof in most cases that the ailments were real, Randi points out that the principle of parsimony (or Occam's razor) would suggest that most, if not all, of the supposed cures did not actually occur. Randi explores some of the difficulties of examining claims and discusses in detail two claims from Lourdes.

=== Faith healing in modern times ===
Rev. William Branham is often credited with originating present day evangelical/fundamentalist faith healing in the 1940s. Radio became an important mechanism for expanding the audience and was used extensively by Rex Humbard and Oral Roberts. Faith healing is quite similar to witchcraft and the practices of African witch doctors in terms of healing by supposedly driving evil spirits from the body. Randi points out that thousands of doctors and nurses are members of the International Order of St. Luke the Physician, an Episcopal organization, thereby acknowledging that they accept that faith healing is valid. St. Stephen's Episcopal Church in Philadelphia offers faith healing services and Randi requested evidence of the many cures that they claimed to have achieved. He received no response. Estimates indicate that tens of millions of Americans are watching televangelists. Many televangelists promote speaking in tongues, telling their followers that the babble that they produce is a secret language to God. Randi recorded the babble produced by one member of a congregation in Toronto. When he played the recording back at a later time, the preacher gave a completely different translation of what was said than he had given the first time. The healers often tell their subjects that absolute, unquestioning faith is required to achieve lasting healing of their ailment. If the healing process fails, then "obviously" the recipient failed to "keep the faith," thus imposing a burden of guilt on the recipient. Many healers practice striking the recipient on the forehead, after which they are expected to fall backwards into the crowd and make some loud exclamation as the evil is supposedly driven from their body. This is known as "slaying in the spirit." Practitioners often use the technique of "calling out," in which they pick out audience members they do not know and disclose information about them, supposedly acquired by their special powers Randi and his associates attended many evangelists' performances and determined their methodology. In many cases, the information had been acquired earlier, before the performance, either by the minister or their associates by simply talking to early arrivals. Other times, questionnaires or "healing cards" were handed out before the show and allowed the desired information to be obtained. During a performance by W. V. Grant, one of Randi's associates brought in a Bible with some false family records recorded inside the front cover that Grant examined before the show. Sure enough, Grant repeated back the bogus information after calling out Randi's associate in the audience, giving the audience the impression that he received this information directly from God.

=== Religious views of faith healing ===
As Randi puts it "Every denomination, sect, and cult of the Christian religion has attempted to explain, condone, deny, embrace, or denounce faith healing." Televangelist Glen Cole openly ridiculed those who chose medication for their illnesses rather than faith healing. The United Church of Canada first called faith healing illegitimate, but later changed their view to say that some of it was authentic without offering any evidence. The Christian Century (Episcopalian) called faith healing a heresy. Many Christian religions still accept the existence of demons of various sorts and the idea that they can be present in an individual, which is actively promoted by faith healers. Demons provide an explanation for suffering and disease as well as the possibility of a cure by casting them out. The Catholic Church has an official rite called exorcism to be used for this purpose. In 1962 the Lutheran Church came out against the "religious quackery" of faith healers and blamed it on their desire for money and personal power.

=== Financial aspects ===
Faith healer A. A. Allen used to tell his followers that poverty was caused by demons, and he did not hesitate to demand donations from them in exchange for his efforts to remove them. Gene Ewing originated the idea of "seed faith" wherein money given to his church acts as a seed which, through the faith of the donor, will supposedly grow and make the donor wealthy. The IRS allows money acquired by faith healers in the operation of their "religion" to be exempt from taxes. The IRS seldom, if ever, examines the actual activities of religious organizations. Oral Roberts once announced in 1987 that if he was not able to raise a certain large sum of money by a certain date that God would take him to heaven before his time. Peter Popoff, a faith healer operating in Upland, California, had a walk-in vault in his home containing a large jewelry case with diamonds and gold bars and a large quantity of cash. After his performances, his wife Liz would pack the cash and checks collected into a large suitcase which they would take home with them. They lived a lavish lifestyle. His performance tricks were exposed by Randi on the Johnny Carson show in February 1986. This substantially reduced his income but did not eliminate it entirely. W. V. Grant and his wife were similar to the Popoffs in their financial success and expensive habits, owning numerous cars, expensive antique furniture and wearing lots of gold jewelry. Regarding Jim and Tammy Faye Bakker, formerly of televisions "PTL Club", Randi says they "established in the mind of the public that money-hungry evangelists can flout every standard of moderation that has been established in civilization."

=== Mail operations of faith-healers ===
Mailing lists are used by the faith healers to bring in a great deal of money. Popoff ran one of the biggest mail operations, generating 100,000 piece mailings several times a month. These often contained gimmick items intended to motivate the recipient to donate. They might describe some urgent need or crisis that required a certain sum of money as soon as possible. W. V. Grant accidentally sent out an appeal for money for church remodeling and air conditioning that was the exact same letter he had sent three years earlier. Rex Humbard sent out a letter that appeared to come from a hotel in Jerusalem, when in fact it had come from a bulk mailing out of Akron, Ohio. The letter included a bookmark, described in the letter as a beautiful gift from Jerusalem, when in fact it was printed in Germany. They would sometimes suggest a specific amount to donate, calling it a seed-gift, and suggesting they pray to be inspired regarding that amount. Oral Roberts' operation was sending out 27 million letters and publications annually and he was assigned his own zip code by the post office. The letters sent out often read as though Roberts was engaging in a two-way correspondence with the recipient even though Roberts received far too much mail to possibly have read and personally replied to it.

=== A. A. Allen and Miracle Valley ===
A. A. Allen, an alcoholic and a defrocked minister, started the Miracle Revival Fellowship and went touring with a big tent show starting in 1955. He soon moved on to radio and television and was very successful there. He sold pieces of his old tent for donations of $100 or more and sold water from his Pool of Bethesda to customers around the world. Randi reports testimony from a doctor about having to take diabetic patients to the hospital after they stopped taking their insulin, believing they were healed by Allen. He was discussed in a 1969 article in Look magazine which stated that one of Allen's supposed healings was of a man who apparently was not actually ill before the cure took place. Allen died in 1970 of liver failure from acute alcoholism.

=== Leroy Jenkins and the $100,000 challenge ===
Leroy Jenkins spent several years in prison for arson and conspiracy to assault two men. He was nevertheless a highly successful televangelist both before and after. Unlike some of the other healers, Jenkens does not appear to use any tricks to obtain personal information about audience members but rather depends on his skill at cold reading, that is, by inferring information directly from the sick person's body language and their responses to questions. He started his career supposedly after being "healed" by A. A. Allen at one of his performances. In 1960 he got some initial funding for his ministry from a wealthy widow after he convinced her that she was his mother. He was arrested for drunkenness in 1972, after which his supporters wrote letters to the newspaper criticizing the police. In 1978 his church, and also his home, suspiciously burned down shortly after he had taken out fire insurance. He was, in due course, arrested, convicted, and sentenced to 12 years in prison. Getting out on work release in 1982 he got the ministry going again. He got involved with various lawsuits related to electronic equipment for the show and also mailing lists. Randi challenged Jenkins to provide evidence of any one healing he had produced. He produced none but suggested that Randi should come to his show. Jenkins tried to turn around the challenge, offering $100,000 to anyone who could prove that he was a phony. Randi pointed out that it was up to Jenkins to provide the evidence that his claims were true.

=== W. V. Grant and the Eagle's Nest ===
W. V. Grant claims that a deer once spoke prophecy to him at a spa near San Diego. His father, also a preacher, once claimed that men would not land on the Moon because Lucifer lives there. Grant lied about his past, claiming falsely that he was once a football star and that he graduated from a university that apparently never heard of him. He did his healing performances at a modest-sized church in Dallas and ran a successful television and mail business. At his revival meetings he claims to cure pretty much everything, even claiming that he can reverse hysterectomies. His ability to "cure" blindness is aided by the fact that most legally blind people actually have some limited visual ability and are able, for example, to identify when two or three fingers are held in front of them.

In 1985, Randi attended a Grant event in St. Louis along with the Rationalist Association. They handed out 2000 leaflets requesting information from anyone who felt they had been genuinely healed. There were no replies. One of Grant's tricks, observed by Randi, was to direct an ill person, who was arriving for the show and who was quite able to walk, to sit in a wheelchair that Grant provided. Then during the show, Grant would "heal" the person, telling them to "get up out of that wheelchair and walk!" Initially the victims of Grant's fake cures were not willing to consider that they had been duped, even when it seemed obvious that that was the case. Randi and his team followed up with many of them later, and they tended to be unhappy, angry, and bitter that they were still ill. Some had to buy hew canes after Grant had broken theirs on stage during the "healing."

One of the people who was supposedly healed by Grant was apparently a shill working for him. Randi discovered this when he tried to check out numerous details given during the show and found that they were incorrect. The doctors did not exist, the hospital did not even perform cardiac surgery, and the man's church had never heard of him. Grant's wheelchair trick was exposed in 1986 on a television show called West 57th and also in Free Inquiry magazine. Al White, a newsman on WOKR-TV in Rochester, ran a devastating 6-part expose on Grant. Another article about Grant and his stage tricks came out on May 22, 1987 in the Oakland Tribune, focusing on how he obtains information about people before the session and then presents it during the act as though it had been revealed to him by God.

White investigated claims by Grant that he was feeding thousands of orphans in Haiti, but White was unable to find evidence of any significant feeding program and none was provided by Grant. Grant often performs a leg-stretching trick, where it appears as though he can cure people who have a short leg. In reality he pulls one of their shoes slightly off and then pushes it back on in front of the camera, making appear that the opposite leg got longer.

In 1982, a woman whose husband, Morris Kidd, was featured in a Grant publication as having been cured of blindness, went to the press and told them that it was a lie and her husband was as blind as before. Randi and associates obtained some of the trash thrown out after a show and found one of Grants "crib sheets" with personal information on potential victims of his performance. Letters given to him requesting his prayers were simply thrown out after any donations were removed. One seriously ill woman at a session appeared to be having a heart attack after following Grant's instructions to get up and run around. Grant told the audience that she was drunk. This was caught on videotape.

=== Peter Popoff ===
Peter Popoff's empire was largely funded by his mailing list in conjunction with his radio and television shows. He worked with a man named Gene Ewing to expand that list and to generate letters based on made up crisis situations and cheap religious gifts for mailings to prospective donors. He once listed his operating costs as $550,000 per month. Randi went on The Tonight Show Starring Johnny Carson twice (Feb 1986 and June 1987) to expose how Popoff performed his tricks on stage. Randi had intercepted messages that were secretly broadcast to Popoff while he was on stage and received by him using a secret earpiece. A 60-second segment from Popoff's show was presented, once without and once with the secret messages that were being sent to Popoff by his wife with names and personal information that he then used to "call out" members of the audience. Carson and the audience were surprised and dismayed. (See also videos of the Popoff exposure in External video links below.) Associates of Randi tracked down a good number of Popoff's victims and all but one of them believed that Popoff had known their names and addresses by the "Gift of Knowledge." One of Randi's associates had spotted the suspected earpiece when up close to Popoff on stage. Then they engaged the help of an electronics specialist with access to a sophisticated radio scanner. Sure enough, after a little effort, they were able to determine the transmission frequency and tune in to the secret transmissions. Randi also caught Popoff doing the same wheelchair trick as Grant. On one occasion a male associate of Randi's posed as a sick woman and was directed before the show to sit in a rented wheelchair. During the show, Popoff cured "her" of uterine cancer and told her to "Get up and walk." After the big exposé on Carson, it took months for there to be much impact on the Popoff money machine. Randi offers the explanation that a lot of fundamentalist, evangelical, and born again Christian homes don't get their news from mainstream television and radio because they have been told not to by their preachers. In another of Popoff's scams, he collected money to smuggle bibles to Russia. He then staged a break-in and vandalism destroying the bibles blaming it on Satan and the atheists. He videotaped the damage and used it on his next show to beg for more money. He often told his audience that they should "loan" money to Jesus and that it would be repaid many times over. He would ask them to consider using their savings accounts, antiques, real estate, a car they weren't using. Numerous people were persuaded to give their life savings to Popoff.

=== Illustrations Part 3 ===
Photos of: Elizabeth Popoff entering trailer where she secretly broadcasts to her husband on stage, Detroit lady who denied talking to Mrs. Popoff when her conversation had been overheard, Randi and associates at Popoff event in Houston, Randi associate Gae Kovalick at Houston event, Don Henvick in disguise as Bernice Manicoff at Detroit Popoff meeting (incorrectly labeled in digital edition), Mr. Kidd being supposedly cured of blindness which his wife later called a lie, Grant in Haiti where he claims to feed orphans, the "how many fingers?" trick which works with legally blind people that have some limited sight, Grant supposedly lengthening a woman's leg, Grant on cover of his publication.

=== 10 Oral Roberts and the City of Faith ===
Oral Roberts is (in 1987) the head of the Oral Roberts Evangelistic Association a $500 million conglomerate which includes, among other things, Oral Roberts University, various hospitals and medical research facilities, a dental school, and a law school. These institutions employ 2800 people in Tulsa, Oklahoma and attract 200,000 visitors a year to that city. Roberts, although he claims to speak directly to God, made some very bad financial decisions, in particular the construction of a $14 million healing center that his advisors told him would not be able to support itself. He ended up taking money from the university to try and prop up the hospital. He blamed the devil for his misfortune. As mentioned earlier, he also threatened to die if his followers didn't somehow donate enough money to bail him out of the financial mess. When accused of living a lavish lifestyle he provided a cryptic justification to his followers. He claims to have begun his ministry after being healed by God of tuberculosis at age 17, although he was apparently receiving conventional medical treatment at the time. He developed a highly successful tent show for his faith healing performances. In October 1987 Roberts claimed that in May he had seen a 900-foot tall figure of Jesus that spoke to him. This was met with a lot of skepticism, but nevertheless it succeeded in bringing in $5 million in donations. Roberts has a son, Richard, who is following in his father's footsteps. Richard's ex-wife Patti wrote a critical book about the ministry called Ashes to Gold. In his tent show days, Roberts insured his success by only healing certain ill people. Attendees who were severely ill or crippled were put in a special room away from the view of others and were not part of the show. Randi once sent a letter to Roberts asking him to provide evidence of the 3 things he had claimed: healing the sick, casting out devils, and raising the dead. Roberts sent him books containing anecdotal material but no actual evidence of any of it. In June 1987, Roberts claimed publicly that he had raised the dead frequently at his services. He also announced that after the Second Coming, he would be ruling the earth alongside Jesus. After this, Randi requested documentation of any one case of resurrection; there was no reply.

=== 11 A Word of Knowledge from Pat Robertson ===
Pat Robertson (in 1987) is running for president of the United States. He is also a faith healing minister who is quite popular and is seen daily on The 700 Club, a talk and news show run by the Christian Broadcasting Network. Randi's original intention was to investigate Robertson. However, perhaps in preparation for his attempt to run for president, Robertson had scaled down his performance in a way that made it impossible to investigate. Rather than claiming to heal a particular participant, he and Ben Kinchlow (another healer) would bow their heads and claim to receive a "Word of Knowledge" from God. They would then claim that some unidentified persons in the television audience were being cured of various ailments such as heart conditions, cancer, stomach problems, inability to walk, and even financial difficulties. Randi calls this the shotgun technique. Sometimes the city where the person lived was identified, but not enough information to actually verify that the person actually existed. But the audience, nevertheless, believes it. One woman claimed her broken ankle was cured by watching a Robertson show, but it turned out that she watched a recorded show that was made before she had broken her ankle. Gerry Straub who was Roberson's producer, wrote a critical book about him called "Salvation for Sale". He describes an incident where Robertson "cured" a man in a wheelchair who was at one of his events. Straub was curious and tried to check up on the man a few weeks later and discovered that he had died 10 days after the show. Robertson has promoted the idea that if one asks for a miracle and it is not granted it is the fault of the supplicant. Randi wrote to Robertson asking for evidence of his healing power but received no answer. In 1979, Robertson had been saying, based on world events, that the Second Coming of Jesus was going to happen very soon. Apparently the staff was so convinced of this that they started planning on filming the event! They were serious about the idea and began referring to it as "God's Special Project" (GSP).

=== Illustrations Part 4 ===
Photos of: some of Grant's rubbish that Randi salvaged, discarded crutches from people who probably should have kept them, Randi and associates after Popoff exposure.

=== 12 The Psychic Dentist and an Unamazing Grace ===
Rev. Willard Fuller of Palatka, Florida claims that he can insert dental fillings and crowns without drilling or even opening the patient's mouth. He also claimed that his healing once caused a person who had lost their teeth to regrow them. Randi notes that Fuller himself has badly discolored teeth of which 6 are missing. Randi tried to get the man charged with fraud. As of publication time for this book nothing had happened. “Amazing” Grace DiBaccari, former hair dresser and singer, is a faith healer who was investigated by Randi and also by reporter Doug Margenson. They tried to obtain any evidence of a cure in numerous claimed cases including paralysis, liver cancer, crushed ankle, arthritis, knee pain, birth defects, and back problems. In no cases was there any evidence. Don Henvick, an associate of Randi's, posed as an ill person as he had at other events. DiBaccari proceeded to heal him of his nonexistent disease. Before revealing the deception, Randi asked her if God ever makes a mistake in His healing messages to her. She replied "never."

=== 13 Father DiOrio: Vatican-Approved Wizard ===
Father Ralph DiOrio is a Catholic priest who claims to have healing powers. He is the best known of a small group of Catholics who operate with approval from the Church. He began his practice one year after the death of Kathryn Kuhlman, believing that he had inherited her abilities. DiOrio uses the shotgun method mentioned previously in which he speaks about some person in the audience, who is unidentified or poorly identified, with a condition that he specifies and then says that that person was just healed. Someone in the audience may indeed believe that he was referring to them and briefly think they feel better or were healed, but it never seems to be the case that something happened that can be verified medically by professionals. He also does the leg stretching stunt mentioned previously. One of his claims is that he cured a girl of Down syndrome, a condition that is considered incurable. Randi investigated, contacting the girl's father. He initially seemed cooperative, but then discontinued contact and did not provide any evidence to support the claim. Randi also contacted DiOrio requesting information about other claimed healings and about a medical team that DiOrio claims has documented his healings. He received no response. In another case, Cecile Boscardin was convinced that DiOrio had cured her cancer in 1976, but she died from the disease less than a year later. DiOrio responded about this to the press and acknowledged that perhaps no one is cured. DiOrio and the Catholic Church differ from other faith healers in that they don't blame the ill person for lack of faith if the healing doesn't work. DiOrio says: "Our prayers do not change the mind of God. Our prayers keep us in tune with the Lord's will." The Church also ran a damning critique of the Oral Roberts ministry titled "Faith Healing over T.V."

=== 14 The Lesser Lights ===
Danny Davis is another divine dentist who claims to be able to fill cavities using only the power of God. He usually operated out of Bakersfield, but when he worked for a while in Virginia he was investigated by the department of health who concluded that he wasn't practicing dentistry without a license because he didn't use any dental equipment. The investigator wasn't concerned with the fact that people came there because Davis claimed to fix dental problems.

Kathryn ("The Great") Kuhlman was a popular faith healer from the 1960s and 1970s who appeared on more than 50 TV stations every week. Interestingly, she died after having conventional surgery for a heart condition in 1976. Dr. Nolen did a long term follow up on 23 of Kuhlman's claimed healings and found no cures. This is discussed in Nolen's book: "Healing: A Doctor in Search of a Miracle." One of Kuhlman's "cures" suffered a collapsed spine the day after her appearance on the show and died 4 months later. Kuhlman is credited with developing the wheelchair gimmick mentioned previously and she also frequently used the previously mentioned "shotgun" technique.

Daniel Atwood is a faith healer from Florida. He worked for a while with Davis Jones as the "front man," who would try to obtain information by talking to audience members before the show. Randi describes them as one of the more entertaining pairs in the business. They were arrested in Waycross, Georgia after talking a woman out of $500 and then working on her to get more after the show. A local judge had been attending the show and was concerned that the participants would be unable to pay their bills and end up in his courtroom after being conned into giving all their money to the pair. After Jones died, Atwood began working with Leroy Jenkins, mentioned previously.

David Epley, based in Florida, puts on an act like W. V. Grant, mentioned previously. In 1986 Epley mentioned that Randi had not come to witness his wonders. So obligingly Randi sent him the details of his usual challenge in which he agrees to pay $10,000 for acceptable proof of 5 cases of healing verified by an independent, medically qualified panel, and would publicly acknowledge their success. Although a newspaper had told Randi of Epley's initial comments, they failed to follow up on the matter of the challenge. Epley got a brain tumor in 1986 and apparently needed ordinary medical care to save his life.

Brother Al (also known as Rev. Al) was a flamboyant character operating out of Fresno. He got his start in the business working as a front man for Epley. One of his gimmicks was to advertise in supermarket tabloids offering to send people a nice scriptural bracelet for only $1.25. He loses money on the bracelet sale, but the real purpose is to get names and addresses to add to his mailing list! He operated a very successful mail business, apparently writing his own begging letters, as well as hosting a radio show.

David Paul operates out of St. Louis. He started off in radio and then moved to television. He preferred an old method where he would have small slips of paper containing information on certain audience members that appeared to be bookmarks stuck in his bible. Randi give an example from one of Paul's shows where he had a slip containing "William Parsons," "Dr. Brown," and "heart attack." This he expanded into a dramatic story, which Randi recorded, that began with "I have an impression of you clutching at your chest," and ended with "Dr. Jesus has put a whole new heart into your body! It's done! Hallelujah!." Paul would put on a dramatic performance, claiming to see the devil in the audience, chasing him down and stomping on him, exclaiming "Take that devil!" Randi and some of his associates attended one meeting with Joan Smith, a reporter for the San Francisco Examiner. Don Henvick was in the audience and had, prior to the performance, been approached by Paul's wife and had given her false information about himself. Sure enough, after supposedly being directed by God, Paul called out "Tom" from the audience, divined his serious marital and drinking problems, and said that God told him that Tom would be healed.

Ernest Angley operated out of Grace Cathedral in Akron, Ohio. Randi and philosophy professor Paul Kurtz attended one of his services in 1986. Randi describes the 2-hour long sermon as "a mind-numbing, disconnected, rambling series of mild admonitions and folksy anecdotes." The healing session had no surprises. Angley sometimes uses the "shotgun" technique and also "slaying in the spirit," both mentioned previously. Randi discovered that most of the audience were regulars, attending every Friday night as a kind of weekly entertainment. Randi calls Angley a relatively harmless, probably sincere, preacher with no complaints about his handling of money. Randi makes no mention of any of the usual deceptive tricks.

Frances and Charles Hunter, also known as the Happy Hunters, are known for their cheerful demeanor and up-beat gospel music. They specialize in conducting healing lessons and make money on this through the sale of videos and other items. They claim they were ordained by God rather than any recognized church. They perform the Grant leg-stretching trick which Randi considers to be intentional deception. Investigator David Alexander attended a meeting in Anaheim in 1987. One man was scolded by Frances for denying what God wanted for him after his pain was not alleviated. Another man was supposedly cured of several herniated discs and was told he should touch his toes. After this he appeared to be in great pain. A woman supposedly cured of cancer went into a coma a week later. The Hunters claim that they once regrew a thumb of a 14-year-old boy. Randi wrote to them requesting the name of the Church where this occurred and the name of the boy. They wrote back saying it was a Methodist church in West Palm Beach Florida and they did not get the name of the boy. Randi contacted every such church, but none could confirm the claimed miracle.

=== 15 Practical Limitations of Medical Science ===
Many people are culturally predisposed to believe in faith healing. The practitioners often promise to do more than doctors do and to do it without cutting or using chemicals. Randi states that according to one medical authority, roughly 3/4 of non-surgical physician's care is not curative but supportive. Cancer, heart disease, and rheumatoid arthritis are the most common reasons that people visit faith healers. Lack of an effective medical treatment in many such cases will lead people to seek out alternatives. When this book came out in 1987, there was no effective treatment for AIDS and these patients were often exploited by faith healers and others. Many physicians think faith healers serve a useful purpose. One doctor in Paris told the press that they "keep a lot of hypochondriacs and hysterical cases out of my surgical practice".

=== 16 Where Is the Evidence? ===
This is a long chapter that brings together information from a wide variety of sources related to faith healing. None found evidence of cures that holds up under scrutiny.

The world is full of misinformation some is the result of wishful thinking and some is produced intentionally for self-serving purposes.

Randi had a relationship with rock star Alice Cooper related to some special effects used in his shows. He describes how the shows reminded him of performances by some of the faith healers. The audience was there to see the star who "had a message, albeit incredible and wild, that they wanted to hear and accept." He also makes a comparison to professional wrestling shows which are largely faked and choreographed. Many people see through the delusion, but keep their opinion to themselves.

Randi described an interaction with James Hayes M.D., who claimed to have made a remarkable healing through faith and had X-rays to prove it. Nothing was forthcoming even after Randi made it clear that he intended to publish something and that his readers would be left with the impression that the doctor's claims were false.

Randi describes an often-quoted case from the 19th century in which a child with a broken arm prays to Jesus to make it well and then convinces the doctor to remove the splint revealing a remarkable recovery. The truth was revealed years later when someone took the trouble to investigate. They contacted the child, who was then grown up and a medical doctor himself. He acknowledged that after several days, he insisted in having the splint removed but then kept his arm, which was only partially broken, in a sling while it continued to heal.

In 1986 Antonio Rosa wrote a newspaper article claiming that he knew of a case of cancer that was cured by a psychic healer. The person who was supposedly cured was the wife of a professor at the University of Hawaii. Randi sent two registered letters to the professor, but received no reply. He then got a letter from Rosa, saying that he believed the account (with no evidence) and accused Randi of having "evil purposes."

Randi, who made it known that he was writing this book, received numerous letters describing miraculous healings. He received several copies of a booklet by Rose Osha who claimed to have been healed including the restoration of two toes that had “rotted off.” Randi wrote to her and after some time she finally responded but refused to provide the evidence Randi requested. Her excuse was that if she sent the information to Randi she would also have to send it to other people and it was too much trouble. Randi points out that it wasn't too much trouble for Rose to publish a 14-page booklet at her own expense. There were two dozen or more other cases that were submitted to Randi. Most of these could not be checked out for lack of traceable data, and the remainder had similar problems to those described above.

Randi is often asked: “Since healers bring hope to their subjects, what harm do they do?” Randi answers this by pointing out that faith healers take us back to the Dark Ages and may very well discourage people from finding legitimate treatments that could actually help them. A second common question is: “If healing takes place, why question how healers do it?” Randi states that his opinion is that miracles are not being done by anyone. Randi has looked very hard for any example of faith healing and has found none. This may not “prove” that it doesn't exist, but it is “evidence” that it likely doesn't exist.

There are real and imaginary (or psychosomatic) ailments. The latter are subject to “cure” by any number of placebo treatments as well as by faith healing. Real problems like arthritis, diabetes, and heart trouble can't be proven to be cured while on stage. Faith healers sometimes say that proof is not possible or desirable because “faith” is required from the participants.

George Bernard Shaw commented on healing at Lourdes: “All those canes, braces, and crutches and not a single glass eye, wooden leg, or toupee”. Many shrines display canes and other orthopedic devices that were discarded by people who visited as proof of cures. Unfortunately, many of those people later have to retrieve them or find a replacement. Randi mentions a surgeon who regularly visits a nearby shrine to retrieve devices left behind by his patients, some of whom are too poor to afford a replacement.

Randi describes an incident when he was 12 years old in Montreal, Canada. He was in a shrine's gift shop and saw a man behind the counter fill two bins with crucifixes from the same bag; The bins were labeled “blessed at the oratory” and “blessed in Rome.” Later his father told him that when he was a boy he had a job at a tailor shop in Montreal. One day he was told to cut small squares from a sheet of wool cloth. These were then sent to the souvenir shop at the shrine to be sold as if they were clothing relics of Brother André, the supposed source of the shrine's healing powers. He also told Randi of a friend who was a Christian Scientist. When that friend was dying of a heart attack, he tried to stop Randi's father from calling for a doctor and asked him to pray instead.

In 1982, Philip Singer, a medical anthropologist interested in alternative healing, investigated W. V. Grant (discussed previously) with the help of his students. They followed up with 8 specific cases and found that none had any evidence to support the claim of miraculous healing. Singer also comments on Grant's claim to have cured 49 diabetics in the audience without actually identifying a single one of them. He said that all of Grant's claims seem to be fraudulent.

Randi mentions three different skeptics groups who similarly followed up on several popular faith healers' results. They found no example of an organic disease healed. In 40 of the many cases that Randi's team examined, the victims were willing to acknowledge that they were not healed at all and were angry and frustrated.

Randi reports on a case presented by faith healing promoter Jess Stearn. A woman claimed she had lost her sight and it was restored by a psychic healer, but it turned out she was receiving medical care and steroids from a regular doctor, who did not find her recovery to be miraculous or surprising. In another case, a woman went blind while being treated by a healer, who then said "She didn't want to get well." In case of failure, blame the patient. A physician named William Standish Reed actually answered a letter sent by Randi regarding a claim of a miraculous cancer cure discussed on TV. But the reply (included as Appendix II) was worthless, saying that the woman's appearance and testimony on The 700 Club was sufficient evidence and refused to answer Randi's specific questions.

The Fresno Bee Newspaper ran an investigation of cures claimed by A. A. Allen during a 3-week revival meeting in April 1956. They covered 400 miles and did not find a single case that could be confirmed by a medical authority. One victim, however, had traveled 1000 miles from Colorado to be "cured" of liver cancer. He died 2 weeks later.

Randi gives some examples from German newspapers and magazines that did a very vigorous takedown of a show on German television featuring a couple from Switzerland putting on a faith healing performance.

As to why people believe, Randi offers quotes by Carl Sagan and Ben Franklin. Sagan says that it's a failure to apply critical thinking and "if we don't practice these tough habits of thought, we cannot hope to solve the truly serious problems that face us—and we risk becoming a nation of suckers, up for grabs by the next charlatan who comes along." Franklin states "There are no greater liars in the world than quacks—except for their patients." Randi emphasizes the need to seek evidence of high quality from both before and after the "cure," and avoid the vast amount of anecdotal information that can't be substantiated. Naturally occurring remission must also be ruled out.

Pat Robertson and some other faith healers actually label science as a tool of the devil. Apparently this works as a means to discourage any careful examination of their claims. Randi points out that this avoidance of seeking the truth about their beliefs is a common aspect of all religious groups. He gives examples of reluctance to test or accept results of analysis of supposed blood or tears produced by a religious statue. He also mentions the Church of Jesus Christ of Latter-day Saints, whose leaders he accuses of having stonewalled investigations into the authenticity of the Book of Mormon, noting that skeptics believe that it was simply made up by the church's founder Joseph Smith. The Catholic Church offers a rationalization of unsuccessful healings, saying that "redemptiveness" is a way of explaining why some are not healed.

Randi points out some interesting similarities between faith healing and psychoanalysis, which are based on a book by Jonathan Miller called "The Human Body." He points out that studies of the efficacy of Psychoanalysis have generally not been favorable. Some of what is slightly favorable, could be the result of the placebo effect, especially in cases involving anxiety. Randi also discusses a possible connection between the generation of endorphins and positive results from faith healing and other dubious therapies. He contrasts faith healing and psychotherapy in that the former tends to make the subject/victim dependent while the goal of the latter is to make them feel in control of their own destinies.

Some common characteristics of all miracles attributed to Jesus in the Bible are discussed along with the question as to whether Jesus may also have been "performing" rather than believing in his own ability to cure disease. One characteristic of faith healing is that the cure is "instantaneous" rather than gradual. Randi says he added this requirement to his own list of standards when examining a case.

Oral Roberts, in 1955, responded to an offer of $1,000 for evidence of cures he made. He came up with two striking examples, but unfortunately, one never obtained a diagnosis from a doctor and the other later had conventional surgery to remove a tumor that supposedly had been healed by Roberts. A Toronto, Canada doctor looked into 30 of Robert's cures and found not one case that could not be attributed to psychological shock or hysteria. One had died. A woman appeared on Roberts' show claiming she had been healed of cancer and then died 12 hours later. In Oakland, a man died during a Roberts revival along with a 3-year-old girl and an elderly Indian woman. In July 1959, a diabetic woman died after throwing away her insulin at a Detroit crusade. Randi lists several more similar cases. He also points out that Roberts claims to be able to raise the dead. Allen Spraggett, a psychic researcher, failed to find any believable cures by Roberts. Reverend Lester Kinsolving wrote an article called "The Power of Positive Greed," which examined Roberts as well as Kathryn Kuhlman, A. A. Allen, and Christian Science, and found no cases that withstood examination.

After Popoff was exposed as a fraud by Randi, he continued making claims. In one case a girl was supposedly cured of epilepsy, but it turned out that she actually had a form of childhood epilepsy that often goes into remission. Another girl with a malignant brain tumor was "cured," but the only evidence presented was testimony by someone falsely claiming to be the girl's grandmother. Dr. Gary P. Posner, a consultant known to the Randi investigators, had access to the medical records and doctors involved and found that there never was a brain tumor and that the girl continues to have migraine headaches.

=== 17 Legal Aspects ===
Randi points to inconsistencies in Supreme Court rulings in regards to respect for religion; they refused to act against Christian Scientists for allowing members to die from curable diseases; they did act against the Rastafarians for allowing the smoking of marijuana and they did act against the Doukhobors for allowing members to have more than one spouse. Also less influential churches than Christian Science have had their members convicted after causing death by withholding medical treatment in favor of prayer. Forty-four states allow parents to refuse medical care for their children on religious grounds. In many cases, where parental convictions were obtained after they allowed their child to die for lack of available medical treatment, the convictions were later reversed for unrelated reasons. Randi suggests that this is because the judges are sympathetic to the plight of the believing parents. Randi lays some blame for the "firm belief" of the parents in faith healing on the theatrics of frauds like Popoff.

Randi briefly mentions other legal issues. The faith healers often claim to be collecting donations for a specific purpose, but then make no attempt to use them for that purpose. Randi points out that when the audience is encouraged to throw their medications on stage, that the crew is likely keeping narcotics and other drugs of value (Randi noticed that such drugs don't appear in the trash). Donations are often referred to as "seed money" with the false promise that the money will grow many times in size and somehow be returned to the victim. Finally he points out that they got Al Capone on tax fraud, a crime that many faith healers are guilty of since they aren't properly following the rules for a nonprofit.

=== 18 Amen! ===
Randi describes the scene in San Francisco, February 23, 1986, where television crews are present to film Popoff giving a faith healing performance. One TV interviewer talks to a small boy with crutches outside. He says he's there to be healed by Popoff. The camera captures his badly deformed legs. The interviewer seems affected by this and the filming stops. After the performance, Randi was going to talk to the boy, who had not been healed, but after seeing how upset the boy was, he could not proceed. The cameraman said "I can't do this."

Randi is often asked if he believes in God or is a Christian. He replies that he has found no reason to adopt such beliefs. Often the questioner then leaves saying there's no point in talking and that they will pray for him. Randi quotes Einstein regarding painters, poets, philosophers, and scientists and how they create a simplified and intelligible picture of the world. Randi expands on this to include ordinary people who have had a world view impressed upon them by their families that includes heaven, hell, demons, and angels which they accept as absolute certainties. He includes this quote by Richard Yao (head of Fundamentalists Anonymous): "Perhaps the unpardonable sin of fundamentalism is its effort to make people suspicious and afraid of their own minds, their own logic and thinking process." Randi ends the book with a biblical quote (Matthew 7:15): "Beware of false prophets, men who come to you dressed up as sheep while underneath they are savage wolves. You will recognize them by the fruits they bear."

=== An Update ===
This update appeared in the revised edition and is dated February 1989. The more recent e-book edition does not include any new information beyond this update except for the One Million Dollar Paranormal Challenge which can be found following the Appendices at the end of the book. It was essentially the same as the $10,000 challenge but with an increased prize amount. The challenge was terminated in 2015. Over 1000 applied to be tested, but none were successful (see the Wikipedia page on the challenge).

Randi starts the update by acknowledging that his book did not have much impact with the true believers. Nor did numerous scandals regarding several well-known faith healers. The Shroud of Turin is now, due to carbon dating, considered an icon rather than a genuine relic by the Catholic Church. The Happy Hunters are less happy, being hounded by skeptics and reporters demanding evidence. Father DiOrio was finally cornered by a reporter regarding the lack of evidence of his claimed healings. Popoff declared, and was granted, bankruptcy but soon was back in business again. W. V. Grant is off television, but still makes public appearances, though to smaller crowds. Randi describes his efforts to do something about ”Reverend” Alexis Orbito, a fraudulent "psychic surgeon" operating in Pompano Beach, Florida. In psychic surgery, sleight of hand is used to create the illusion that diseased parts are being removed through an incision that doesn't really exist. Randi went to the Broward medical association, the newspapers, and the police department but none were willing to act against someone claiming to be a minister. In a similar case in California, Brother Joe Bugarin was arrested after performing a fake surgery on a plainclothes detective and was later sentenced to 9 months in prison. Daniel Atwood (mentioned previously) was arrested after swindling two women out of $20,000 and got 9 to 18 years in federal prison.

=== Bibliography ===
List of 19 books that Randi refers to in the text

=== Appendix I ===
Details of the requirements to collect Randi's $10,000 prize for demonstration of psychic, supernatural, or paranormal ability.

=== Appendix II ===
Photocopy of letter to Randi from William Standish Reed regarding the faith healing of a specific cancer "cure" but failing to answer any of Randi's questions on the matter.

=== Appendix III ===
Photocopy of a Popoff "crib sheet," with data on people in the audience that was collected in advance of the performance and is read to him by his wife during the performance using a radio transmitter and a concealed earphone in Popoff's ear.

=== Appendix IV ===
Photocopy of a letter to Randi from Oral Roberts, which is typical of the letters he sends out to his followers.

=== The One Million Dollar Paranormal Challenge ===
The One Million Dollar Paranormal Challenge is an updated version of the $10,000 challenge listed in Appendix I with an increased prize amount.

=== About the Author ===
Gives a brief description of Randi's long career as a conjurer, mentalist, and escape artist going by the stage name of "The Amazing Randi," followed by many years as a tireless investigator and debunker of the claims made by psychics and faith healers.

=== About the JREF ===
The JREF is the James Randi Educational Foundation, which is dedicated to defending people from bogus paranormal and pseudoscientific claims, and to promote critical thinking.

== Reception ==
In 1988, Earl Hautala in a review wrote "Randi applies the scalpel of science to expose the ills of faith healing to the light." He ends his review with: "An eye opener for the naïve, this book provides a crash course in the methods of skeptical inquiry."

In the New Scientist, Roy Herbert praised the book in a 1990 review. He says: "Randi has been driven to fury by the deceptions practiced by the unctuous charlatans of the US who claim to have thaumaturgical powers directly given to them by God." He notes that "Randi is relentless in pursuing them and exposing their methods and absence of results," and observes that "The book shockingly illustrates the power of lies. Most people do not expect straightforward, wholesale, conscious lying. They know about half-truths, embroidery and exaggeration and are not innocent of their use themselves, but perfectly deliberate lying catches them out."

Loren Pankratz wrote a 10-page article in 1987 in the Journal of Religion & Health about the conflict between charlatans and stage magicians which includes a review of Randi's book. He agrees with Randi's conclusions, stating "The findings of Randi raise the specter of deliberate hoax on the part of faith healers. We now know that some are charlatans who deceive for their own purposes."

== Gallery of previous editions ==
First edition, 31 Mar 1987
318 pages, hardcover, Prometheus Books, cover artist David Peña
ISBN 9780879753696

New, Updated edition, 1 APR 1989
328 pages, paperback, Prometheus Books, includes an update chapter, cover photo by José Alvarez, jacket design by Kathleen Molik
ISBN 9780879755355

== See also ==
- James Randi Educational Foundation
- Faith healing

== External video links ==
- An Honest Liar: Exposing Peter Popoff, 2:36 long clip from the 2014 movie "An Honest Liar" which is about James Randi.
- Randi demonstrating psychic surgery, 4:30 long clip about the scam called psychic surgery on The Tonight Show Starring Johnny Carson in 1980s
- Peter Popoff vs James Randi in 2007, 4:43 long clip from Inside Edition television show
- Randi on Dateline 1995 pt2, 8:16 long clip includes section on Popoff
- James Randi debunking Peter Popoff's Faith Healing Scam, 7:15 long video, first half is video of Popoff performing and being exposed, second half is 2013 interview with Randi
- James Randi Debunks Peter Popoff Faith Healer, 4:28 long from 2006
