= Robert Tilton =

American television evangelist (born 1946)

- Born: Robert Gibson Tilton; June 7, 1946 (age 80); McKinney, Texas, U.S.
- Other name: Bob Tilton
- Occupations: Televangelist; pastor; author
- Employer: Word of Faith World Outreach Center Church
- Television: Success-N-Life (1981–1993; 1997–?)
- Movement: Nondenominational charismatic Christianity; prosperity theology
- Spouses: Martha Phillips (m. 1968; div. 1993) Leigh Valentine (m. 1994; div. 1997) Maria Rodriguez Tilton (m. 2002)
- Children: Amy; Jon; Marc; Matt
- Website: www.roberttiltonlive.com

Robert Gibson Tilton (born June 7, 1946) is an American televangelist and the former pastor of the Word of Faith Family Church in Farmers Branch, Texas, Texas, a suburb of Dallas. At his ministry's peak in 1991, Tilton's infomercial-style program, Success-N-Life, aired in all 235 American television markets (on a daily basis in the majority of them) and brought in nearly $80 million per year; it was described as "the fastest growing television ministry in America".

When ABC's Primetime Live raised questions about Tilton's fundraising practices, a series of investigations into the ministry were initiated, and Success-N-Life was taken off the air. Tilton later returned to television on a new version of the program airing on BET and The Word Network.

== Life and career ==
Robert Gibson Tilton was born in McKinney, Texas, on June 7, 1946, to Margaret (Gibson) and Clyde Tilton. He attended Cooke County Junior College and Texas Technological University. He married his first wife, Martha "Marte" Phillips, in 1968. According to his autobiographical materials, Tilton had a conversion experience to evangelical Christianity the following year and began his ministry in 1974, taking his family on the road to, in his words, "preach this gospel of Jesus". Tilton preached to small congregations and revivals throughout Texas and Oklahoma. His family settled in Dallas and built the Word of Faith Family Church, a small nondenominational charismatic church in Farmers Branch in 1976. The church started a local television program then known as Daystar.

Tilton's young church was growing steadily, but Daystar failed to expand beyond the Dallas area until Tilton traveled to Hawaii – his self-described version of Jesus's forty days in the wilderness – and came upon an increasingly popular new form of television programming: the late-night infomercial. Tilton was particularly influenced by Dave Del Dotto, a real estate promoter who hosted hour-long infomercials showing his glamorous life in Hawaii, as well as on-camera testimonials lauding his "get rich quick" books. Upon his return from Hawaii in 1981, Tilton, with the help of a US$1.3 million loan from Dallas banker Herman Beebe, revamped Daystar into an hour-long "religious infomercial" with the title Success-N-Life.

== Success-N-Life ==
On Success-N-Life, Tilton regularly taught that all of life's trials, especially poverty, were a result of sin. His message consisted mainly of impressing upon viewers the importance of making "vows"—financial commitments to Tilton's ministry. His preferred vow, stressed frequently on his broadcasts, was $1,000. Occasionally, Tilton would claim to have received a word of knowledge for someone to give a vow of $5,000 or even $10,000. When a person made a vow to Tilton, he preached that God would recognize the vow and reward the donor with vast material riches. The show also ran "testimonials" of viewers who gave to Tilton's ministry and reportedly received miracles in return, a practice that would be used as the basis for a later lawsuit from donors charging Tilton's ministry with fraud.

A Dallas Morning News story published in 1992 observed that Tilton spent more than 84% of his show's airtime for fundraising and promotions, a total higher than the 22% for an average commercial television show; other sources put the total fundraising time during episodes of Success-N-Life closer to 68%. Some of Tilton's fundraising letters were written by Gene Ewing, the head of a multimillion-dollar marketing empire writing donation letters for other televangelists like W. V. Grant and Don Stewart.

As a result of Tilton's television success, Word of Faith Family Church grew to become a megachurch, with 8,000 members at its height. In the early 1990s, his ministry would reach across the globe. Tilton also wrote several self help books about financial success, including The Power to Create Wealth, God's Laws of Success, How to Pay Your Bills Supernaturally, and How to be Rich and Have Everything You Ever Wanted. Most of his books were published in the 1980s and distributed via promotion on Success-N-Life and through the many mailings Tilton's ministry sent his followers. The books were republished in the late 1990s to be used as centerpieces of his 1997 infomercial series and are now promoted on his current (as of 2010) daily live internet broadcast.

== Ministry and fundraising scandal ==
In 1991, ABC News conducted an investigation of Tilton (as well as two other Dallas-area televangelists, Grant and Larry Lea). The investigation, assisted by Trinity Foundation president Ole Anthony and broadcast on ABC's Primetime Live on November 21, 1991, alleged that Tilton's ministry threw away prayer requests without reading them, keeping only the accompanying money or valuables sent to the ministry by viewers, garnering his ministry an estimated US$80 million a year.

=== Allegations of exploitation of vulnerable people ===
Anthony, a Christian minister whose organization works with the homeless and the poor on the east side of Dallas, first took an interest in Tilton's ministry in the late 1980s after encountering needy people who told him they had lost all of their money making donations to high-profile televangelists, especially Tilton. Curious about the pervasiveness of the problem, the Trinity Foundation got on the mailing lists of several televangelists, including Tilton, and started keeping records of the many types of solicitations they received almost daily from various ministries.

Former Coca-Cola executive Harry Guetzlaff came to Trinity after he had been turned away from Tilton's church when he found himself on hard times following a divorce. He had been a longtime donor and gave up his last $5,000 as a "vow of faith" just weeks earlier. Guetzlaff's experience, combined with the sheer magnitude of mailings from Tilton's ministry, spurred Anthony, a former Air Force intelligence officer and licensed private investigator, to start a full investigation of Tilton's ministry. Guetzlaff joined Anthony in the task of gathering details on Tilton's operation and later did much of the legwork in uncovering the paper trail for the ABC News investigation.

=== Undercover investigation ===
In a November 21, 1991, promotional appearance on Live with Regis and Kathie Lee, Diane Sawyer said that she had incidentally watched several televangelist programs, including Success-N-Life, and was both "fascinated" and "disturbed" by them. Stressing the public's sensitivity to reporters questioning religion, Sawyer said that she spoke with other journalists, and then eventually to ABC producers, who then decided to conduct their own investigation into Grant, Lea, and Tilton. ABC producers learned about possible resources available from Anthony and Trinity, and contacted them for information. After comparing their accumulated notes, data and details, the two groups decided to pool their efforts and began planning the undercover portion of the story. Anthony agreed to portray himself as a Dallas-based minister with a small church looking into the ways TV ministries could grow so quickly, and the ABC producers would pose as Anthony's "media consultants."

=== Meeting with Response Media ===
The team, armed with hidden cameras and microphones, arrived for a meeting at Response Media, the Tulsa-based marketing firm handling Tilton's mass mailings, to discuss a proposal sent by Anthony to Response Media about fundraising for a religious-based TV talk show. The director of Response Media, Jim Moore, described for Anthony and the hidden cameras (concealed in the undercover Primetime Live producers' glasses and handbags) many techniques used by Tilton to raise funds for his ministry. Moore also said that Tilton was doing "far better than anyone knows" and described the main strategy Tilton employed for such a high return rate on his mailings—that is, send the recipient a "gimmick" that compelled the recipient to mail something back in return, and most recipients would include some money along with it. Moore declined to disclose how much Response Media was paid for its services or how much money the mailings were generating for the Tilton ministry.

However, as part of his sales pitch to Anthony, Moore disclosed that the response letters generated by the fundraising mailings Response Media sends out for its clients were never delivered to the client; instead, they were sent unopened to the client's financial institution or other institutions of choice. "You never have to touch it", Moore added in response to a clarification question from Anthony about dealing with the gimmick objects sent to the potential donors in the mails. One of the ABC producers asked whether this was a standard practice—"So the mail goes straight to the bank?"—and Moore asserted that it was: "The mail goes to the bank, and they put the money in your account. We just get the paper with the person's name and how much they gave."

=== 1991 Primetime Live documentary ("The Apple of God's Eye") ===
Trinity members, acting on this information, started digging through dumpsters outside Tilton's many banks in the Tulsa area as well as dumpsters outside the office of Tilton's lawyer, J. C. Joyce (also based in Tulsa). Over the next thirty days, Trinity's "garbologists", as Anthony dubbed them, found tens of thousands of discarded prayer requests, bank statements, computer printouts containing the coding for how Tilton's "personalized" letters were generated, and more, all of which were shown in detail on the Tilton segment within the Primetime Live broadcast, titled "The Apple of God's Eye". In a follow-up broadcast on November 28, 1991, Sawyer said that Trinity and Primetime Live assistants found prayer requests in bank dumpsters on fourteen separate occasions in a thirty day period.

=== Denial ===
Tilton vehemently denied the allegations and took to the airwaves on November 22, on a special episode of Success-N-Life entitled "Primetime Lies", to air his side of the story. He asserted that the prayer requests found in garbage bags shown on Primetime Live were stolen from the ministry and planted in the dumpster for a sensational camera shot, and that he prayed over every prayer request received, to the point that he "laid on top of those prayer requests so much that 'the chemicals actually got into [his] bloodstream, and... [he] had two small strokes in [his] brain." Tilton remained defiant on claims regarding his use of donations to his ministry to fund various purchases, asking, "Ain't I allowed to have nothing?" with regards to his ownership of multiple multimillion-dollar estates. Tilton also claimed that he needed plastic surgery to repair capillary damage to his lower eyelids from ink that seeped into his skin from the prayer requests.

=== Further revelations ===
After Trinity members spent weeks poring over the details of the documents they and ABC had uncovered, sorting and scrutinizing each prayer request, bank statement, and computer printout dealing with the codes Tilton's banks and legal staff used when categorizing the returned items, Anthony called a press conference in December 1991 to present what he described as Tilton's "Wheel of Fortune", using a large display covered in actual prayer requests, copies of receipts for document disposition, and other information which demonstrated what happened to money and prayer requests which the average viewer of Tilton's television program sent him. When both Tilton and his lawyer J. C. Joyce reacted to the news by claiming the items Anthony was displaying had somehow been stolen by "an insider", Anthony responded in a subsequent interview that "Joyce was our mole—a lot of this stuff came from the dumpster outside his office."

Primetime Live's original investigation and subsequent updates included interviews with several former Tilton employees and acquaintances. In the original investigation, one of Tilton's former prayer hotline operators claimed the ministry cared little for desperate followers who called for prayer, saying Tilton had a computer installed in July 1989 to make sure the operators talked to no caller for longer than seven minutes. The former employee also revealed very specific instructions were given to them in terms of how to talk with callers and they were told to always ask for a $100 "vow" at a minimum. Also in the original report, a former friend of Tilton's from college (who remained anonymous and was shown in silhouette) claimed both he and Tilton would attend tent revival meetings as a "sport" and would claim to be anointed and healed at the meetings. He added the two had often discussed the notion that after graduation they would set up their own roving revival ministry "and drive around the country and get rich." In a July 1992 update to the investigation, Primetime Live interviewed Tilton's former maid, who claimed prayer requests which were sent to Tilton's house by the ministry were routinely ignored until he told her to move them out of the house and into the garage; according to the maid, "they stacked up and stacked up" in the garage until Tilton had them thrown away. In the same interview, Tilton's former secretary came forward and claimed Tilton lifted excerpts from "get rich quick" books and used them in his sermons, and she never saw him perform normal pastoral duties such as visiting with the sick and praying with members.

=== Government involvement ===
Despite Tilton's repeated denials of misconduct, the State of Texas and the federal government became involved in subsequent investigations, finding more causes for concern about Tilton's financial status with each new revelation. After nearly 10,000 pounds of prayer requests and letters to the Tilton ministry were found in a disposal bin at a Tulsa area recycling firm in February 1992, along with itemized receipts of their delivery from Tilton's main mail-handling service in Tulsa rather than from the church offices in Farmers Branch, Tilton admitted in a deposition given to the Texas Attorney General's office that he often prayed over computerized lists of prayer requests instead of the actual prayer requests themselves, and that prayer requests were in fact routinely thrown away after categorization.

As each revelation became increasingly more damaging, viewership and donations declined dramatically. The last episode of Success-N-Life aired nationally on October 30, 1993. By that time, viewership had fallen 85 percent and monthly donations went from $8 million to $2 million.

=== Failed libel action ===
In 1992, Tilton sued ABC for libel because of its investigation and report, but the case was dismissed in 1993. Federal Judge Thomas Rutherford Brett, in his July 16, 1993, dismissal of the case, stated that information in Trinity's logs on prayer requests reportedly found in dumpsters on September 11, 1991, "could not have been found then because the postmark date was after September 11, 1991", but also noted that Anthony had recanted the erroneous entries in a subsequent affidavit. Tilton appealed the decision in 1993; although the findings of the original court were upheld in 1995, federal Judge Michael Burrage's opinion criticized ABC and the Primetime Live producers for their editing of the story and noted that ABC had been warned by their own religion editor, Peggy Wehmeyer (who knew Anthony from her work as a religion reporter at ABC affiliate WFAA-TV in Dallas), that, "Mr. Anthony could not be trusted and was obsessed with his crusade against [Tilton]." Tilton once more appealed the decision, this time to the U.S. Supreme Court in 1996, but the court refused to hear the case.

=== Tilton sued for fraud ===
Several donors to Tilton's television ministry sued Tilton in 1992–1993, charging various forms of fraud. One plaintiff, Vivian Elliott, won $1.5 million in 1994 when it was discovered that a family crisis center for which she had made a donation (and recorded an endorsement testimonial) was never built or even intended to be built. The judgment was later reversed on appeal.

As part of the defense strategy to the fraud cases, Tilton sued Anthony, Guetzlaff and four plaintiff's lawyers who had filed the fraud cases against him in federal court in Tulsa. The tactic is known to critics as a "SLAPP" (strategic lawsuit against public participation) suit. Tilton claimed that the individuals conspired to violate his First Amendment rights under a federal statute designed to protect black citizens from the Ku Klux Klan. (42 U.S.C. Sec. 1985.) Defense attorneys Martin Merritt of Dallas and ACLU lawyer Michael Linz, also of Dallas, with others, won dismissal for the six defendants in federal district court. On appeal, in Tilton v. Richardson, 6 F.3d 683 (10th Cir.1993), the 10th Circuit Court of Appeals affirmed the dismissal on the grounds that 42 U.S.C. Sec. 1985 did not protect a nonminority individual against a purely private conspiracy, if one existed. The fraud cases continued until the Texas Supreme Court eventually ruled that the plaintiffs could not prove damages because they could not show that, if Tilton had actually prayed over the prayer requests, the prayers would have been answered.

The decline of Success-N-Life also led to the end of Tilton's 25-year marriage to his wife Marte, who had been administrative head of the Word of Faith Family Church and World Outreach Center, in 1993. Dallas lawyer Gary Richardson, who represented many of the parties suing Tilton for fraud, attempted to intervene in the Tiltons' divorce, citing the potential for the divorce settlement to be used to hide financial assets that were currently part of the many fraud cases; Richardson's petition to have the divorce action put on hold until after the fraud cases were settled was denied. Marte intervened in Tilton's second divorce from Leigh Valentine, who had asked the court to include the church and all its assets as community property in the proceedings. Under Texas law, property accumulated during a marriage is considered community property and thus subject to division between the parties in a divorce. The jury eventually ruled against the request.

== Lexington Academy ==
Lexington Academy was a small private Christian school in Farmers Branch that was founded in the early 1980s by Robert and Marte Tilton. The name "Lexington" was chosen in honor of the Battle of Lexington; the school mascot was the Patriots. The school was a member of the Texas Association of Private and Parochial Schools (TAPPS), and won dozens of state championships in athletics, academics, and fine arts during the less than twenty years of its existence, including five overall TAPPS state championships. The school was dissolved in 1998 as a result of debts incurred from lawsuits against Tilton and his ministry.

== Reviving Success-N-Life ==
After moving to Fort Lauderdale, Florida, in 1996, Tilton returned to the airwaves in 1997 with a new version of Success-N-Life, buying airtime on independent television stations primarily serving inner city areas. The new version of Success-N-Life returned to Tilton's previous message of asking for "vows of faith" from viewers instead of exorcisms. In 1998, the program began airing on Black Entertainment Television (BET) as part of its two-hour late night umbrella rotation block of religious programming entitled BET Inspiration. In 2008, Success-N-Life usually occupied the first hour of the BET programming block and also ran on The Word Network. Most of the shown on BET Inspiration were taped in the late 1990s—with testimonials from 1980s-era episodes interspersed throughout the episodes—but Tilton also recorded infomercials for his books at least once a year from 2003 to 2007, often appearing with his third wife, Maria Rodriguez, and their four French poodles.

The Word of Faith Family Church and World Outreach Center was finally formally dissolved by Tilton in 1996. Though Tilton was still listed as the church's senior pastor, he had not preached at the church since March 16, 1996, when he named Chattanooga, Tennessee, minister Bob Wright as senior associate pastor, and its membership had declined to less than 300. The church building was purchased by the city of Farmers Branch in 1999 for use as a future civic center; however, the economy suffered a downturn and the plans were scrapped, and the building was finally demolished in 2003 to make room for a new Dallas Stars-sponsored youth hockey center.

In March 2005, Tilton started a new church in Hallandale, Florida, not far from his home in Miami Beach. The church had already existed for some time under the pastorship of former televangelist David Epley. Tilton's new church, now called "Christ the Good Shepherd Worldwide Church", had approximately 200 members in 2007. On May 13, 2007, the church moved into a new location in Miami and was officially renamed "Word of Faith Church", much like the original church in Dallas. Tilton also established a church in Las Vegas, Nevada, in 2005, also originally named Christ the Good Shepherd Worldwide Church. It has also been officially renamed "Word of Faith Church". The Las Vegas church's resident pastor is Natalie Vafai.

== Current ministry ==
When Tilton returned to television in 1997, he established his ministry's headquarters in Tulsa, where his lawyer J. C. Joyce's offices were located, and set up a post office box as its mailing address. A woman employed by Mail Services, Inc., a Tulsa-area clearinghouse that handled mail sent to Tilton's ministry, said that when she worked for Mail Services, Inc. in 2001, prayer requests were still routinely thrown away after donations and pledges were removed. However, Tilton dropped the Tulsa address in late 2007 and used a Miami post office box to receive responses to his fundraising mailings. In January 2014, he was holding services at the Courtyard Marriott in Culver City, California, while having donations again sent to a post office box in Tulsa.

In 1998, The Washington Post reported that Tilton's following disappeared after the investigations but he had "joined dozens of other preachers to become fixtures on BET". Consequently, Tilton, along with Stewart and Peter Popoff, received "criticism from those who say that preachers with a long trail of disillusioned followers have no place on a network that holds itself out as a model of entrepreneurship for the black community."

Steve Lumbley, who worked for Tilton's ministry in 1991 when the original Primetime Live investigation took place, told a reporter for the Dallas Observer in 2006 that reports of prayer request disposal that were the centerpiece of the ABC exposé were highly exaggerated. In an article for the Observer blog "Unfair Park", Lumbley asserted that "[t]he mailings all had some kind of gimmick. They weren't godly at all. But the primary allegation that came out of that—that prayer requests were thrown away—was categorically untrue, and I can guarantee you that was not a normal practice." However, Lumbley, who now runs a Christian watchdog website called ApostasyWatch.com, does credit ABC and the Trinity Foundation for exposing Tilton's unethical fundraising tactics, noting that, "God was using Ole and ABC to chastise Tilton and bring him down."

Trinity still monitors Tilton's television ministry as part of its ongoing televangelist watchdog efforts. In a 2003 interview published in the Tulsa World, Anthony estimated that with none of the Word of Faith Family Church overhead and with television production costs at a fraction of the original Success-N-Life program, Tilton's current organization was likely grossing more than $24 million per year tax-free.

== Satire ==
In 1985, two men began distributing a video created at KTZZ-TV in Seattle (today's KZJO), lampooning Tilton and his ostensible conversations with God. The video exploits Tilton's facial expressions and preaching style. The original video contained no title screen and was roughly edited. The video featured a medley of footage from Success-N-Life overdubbed with well-timed sound effects of flatulence. Unofficial VHS copies of the video circulated in the U.S. through the late 1980s under such titles as Tooting Tilton, Heaven Only Knows (the first title by the original distributors), Pastor Gas, The Joyful Noise, and The Farting Preacher. After the hosts of The Mark & Brian Show, a radio program in Los Angeles, mentioned the video on the air, they saw the market potential and began selling official copies. Similar videos have since been made with more recent footage of Tilton and are distributed throughout the Internet, all under the Farting Preacher name. The video distribution (including digital bootlegs distributed online) expanded public awareness of Tilton and his controversial television ministry.

The name "Tilton" is referred to in the song "Cash Cow (A Rock Opera In Three Small Acts)", from the 1993 album called Squint by music artist and film director Steve Taylor, where it says:

The cash cow! The golden cash cow had a body like the great cows of ancient Egypt, and a face like the face of Robert Tilton—without the horns. And through the centuries, it has roamed the Earth like a ravenous bovine, seeking whom it may—lick! [between about 1:11 and 1:36 on the CD version]

The song "I Know" on the Barenaked Ladies' 1996 album Born on a Pirate Ship includes the lines: "If a hundred monkeys each could get their own show / perhaps one day a chimp might say," followed by a sample of Tilton saying, "and you have faith! You just need to use it, saith the Lord."

The musician Pogo created the song "Hoo Ba Ba Kanda" using the sounds and words of Tilton from his program.

The comedy material of Ron White also includes mention of Tilton. In the opening to White's act in the first Blue Collar Comedy Tour movie, White says that "while sitting in a beanbag chair naked eating Cheetos", he finds Tilton on TV and believes Tilton is talking specifically to him: "Are you lonely?" "Yeah." "Have you wasted half your life in bars pursuing sins of the flesh?" "This guy's good ..." "Are you sitting in a beanbag chair naked eating Cheetos?" White gapes in horror before squeaking "Yes sir!" "Do you feel the urge to get up and send me a thousand dollars?" (pause for effect) "Close! I thought he was talking about me there for a second. Apparently, I ain't the only cat on the block (who) digs Cheetos!"

In the early 2000s, the Trinity Foundation put together a number of news broadcasts, including the initial Primetime Live piece, from the years surrounding the investigations into Tilton's ministry on a DVD entitled The Prophet of Prosperity: Robert Tilton and the Gospel of Greed. The DVD also includes segments from The Daily Show's "God Stuff" (hosted by Trinity member John Bloom, a.k.a. Joe Bob Briggs), excerpts from the Pastor Gas he was a kind man videos, and a number of mocking music videos, as well as moments from Success-N-Life showing Tilton's more outrageous claims of "visions from God."

Tilton's antics are also lampooned in the area of software technology by Douglas Crockford. Crockford created "The Tilton Macro Preprocessor", which he describes as "one of the ugliest programming languages ever conceived".

Bruce Prichard, who portrayed Brother Love in the WWE, has stated that the character was largely based on Tilton's way of speaking.

The comedian and satirist John Oliver criticized Tilton's televangelism ministry as fraudulent on his nationwide television program Last Week Tonight on August 17, 2015. Oliver and his team had corresponded with Tilton's Faith Worldwide Church for seven months; it began when a $20 donation was sent to the organization. Oliver explained what happened during those months: the organization sent a letter back with a $1 bill asking Oliver to "send it back" with more offerings, leading to a slew of appeals for further donations with nothing substantive in return, according to an account in The Christian Post:

That's right ... I had to send the $1 back with an additional recommended offering of $37, which I did. So at this point, we're just two letters in and it's like having a pen pal who's in deep with some loan sharks.

Oliver set up his own "televangelism" megachurch on his broadcast, which he called Our Lady of Perpetual Exemption.
