= Jesse Duplantis =

American preacher (born 1949)

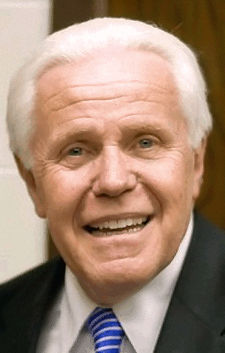
- Jesse Duplantis in 2009
- Born: Jessie Gillis Duplantis; July 9, 1949 (age 77); Destrehan, Louisiana, U.S.
- Years active: 1976-present
- Spouse: Cathy Duplantis (m. 1970)
- Children: daughter, Jodi Duplantis Walker (b. 1972)

Ecclesiastical career
- Church: Pentecostalism
- Congregations: Covenant Church
- Website: https://www.jdm.org

Jesse Duplantis (born July 9, 1949) is an American preacher from the Christian Charismatic movement. He is based in New Orleans, Louisiana, U.S., and the founder of Jesse Duplantis Ministries.

Duplantis' theological beliefs are a combination of Charismatic, Prosperity, and Word of Faith doctrines, and he is considered to be a preacher of the prosperity gospel.

Duplantis was on the board of regents of Oral Roberts University, which awarded him an honorary doctorate, until late 2007, when he, fellow regent Creflo Dollar, and the president of the university Richard Roberts all resigned. Duplantis said in a prepared statement released by the school, "the demands of ministry have made it increasingly difficult to continue to effectively serve." The rest of the Board which included Kenneth Copeland and Benny Hinn was swept away over the next few weeks after the university accepted a $70 million donation on the condition it inaugurate "a new era of transparent governance and accountability."

== Private jet ==
In May 2018, national news media outlets reported that Duplantis had asked his followers to donate money to him so that he could buy a Dassault Falcon 7X, valued at $54 million. Duplantis said that his organization, Jesse Duplantis Ministries, had already paid for three private jets by 2006, and that he had been using them by "just burning them up for the Lord Jesus Christ." Duplantis defended his choice by saying: "I really believe that if Jesus was physically on the earth today he wouldn't be riding a donkey. Think about that for a minute. He'd be in an airplane preaching the gospel all over the world." In response to a wave of criticism, Duplantis stated on his ministry website, "I'm not asking you to pay for my plane, I'm asking you to pray for my plane."

In 2016, Duplantis and fellow televangelist Kenneth Copeland defended their use of private jets with the claim that commercial planes were full of "demons".

== Other issues ==
Duplantis has been the subject of investigation by the Trinity Foundation, a religious watchdog organization, for more than 10 years. The organization's president Ole Anthony said that because of Duplantis' tax exemption, technically, every person in St. Charles Parish was "helping to pay for Duplantis' extravagant lifestyle".

In the aftermath of 2021's Hurricane Ida, Duplantis has faced criticism for his ministry's perceived lack of response to helping the community. His church resides in St. Charles Parish, where some 95 percent of the residences remained without power for weeks after the storm. St. Charles Parish was one of the hardest-hit areas. In response, Duplantis said that the church had donated $100,000 in generators to the community. A few weeks later, Duplantis claimed the Second Coming was held up by a lack of donations, while touting his multi-millionaire status.

In February 2024, Duplantis was named as a defendant in an amended civil securities fraud complaint filed by Colorado regulators concerning the promotion of the cryptocurrency INDXcoin. The complaint alleges that Duplantis was among individuals recruited by Denver pastor Eli Regalado to help sell unlicensed securities within Christian communities and that certain recruits received commission payments. The broader case claims INDXcoin raised more than $3 million from over 300 investors between 2022 and 2023 through promises of guaranteed returns based on divine guidance. Duplantis’ ministry, Jesse Duplantis Ministries, declined to comment on the matter.

== Published works ==
=== Books ===
- Ministry of Cheerfulness. Tulsa, Oklahoma: Harrison House. 1994. ISBN 0-89274-799-4.
- Heaven: Close Encounters of the God Kind. Tulsa, Oklahoma: Harrison House. 1996. ISBN 0-89274-943-1.
- Breaking the Power of Natural Law: Finding Freedom in the Presence of God. Tulsa, Oklahoma: Harrison House. 1999. ISBN 1-57794-224-8.
- Jambalaya for the Soul. Tulsa, Oklahoma: Harrison House. 2000. ISBN 1-57794-304-X.
- God Is Not Enough, He's Too Much!. Tulsa, Oklahoma: Harrison House. 2001. ISBN 1-57794-397-X.
- Wanting a God You Can Talk to. Tulsa, Oklahoma: Harrison House. 2001. ISBN 1-57794-315-5.
- One More Night With The Frogs. Louisiana: Jesse Duplantis Ministries. 2003. ISBN 0-9728712-5-X.
- What in Hell Do You Want. Louisiana: Jesse Duplantis Ministries. 2003. ISBN 0-9728712-8-4.
- The Battle of Life. Jesse Duplantis Ministries. 2003. ISBN 0-9728712-2-5.
- The Everyday Visionary: Focus Your Thoughts, Change Your Life. Touchstone. 2008. ISBN 978-1-4165-4976-5.
- Why Isn't My Giving Working? The Four Types of Giving. Jesse Duplantis Ministries. 2013. ISBN 9780981997735.
