= W. V. Grant =

American televangelist (born 1945)

W.V. Grant
- Born: Walter Vinson Grant, Jr. May 25, 1945 (age 81); Dallas, Texas, U.S.
- Education: B.A., Southwestern Assemblies of God Bible University (History/Religion); M.A., Dallas Baptist University (History)
- Occupation: Televangelist/faith healer
- Title: Head Pastor, Eagles Nest Cathedral Church in Dallas, TX
- Spouse: Brenda Gayle Hayes (died 2020)
- Children: 3

Walter Vinson Grant Jr. (born May 25, 1945) is an American televangelist whose ministry has been based in the Greater Dallas area.

== Career ==
Grant began his career in Cincinnati, Ohio, in the mid-1970s with the "Cathedral of Compassion" in the Over-the-Rhine area of Cincinnati before relocating to the suburbs of St Bernard until the early 1980s. The son of minister Walter Vinson Grant, Sr., in 1983 Grant took over Soul's Harbor Church (located in the Oak Cliff section of Dallas) and expanded its ministry, later renaming the church as "Eagles Nest Cathedral". In 1987, Grant purchased 28 acres (11 hectares) in the southwest section of Dallas (near Dallas Baptist University) and built the "Eagle's Nest Family Church", and continued pastoring the 5000-seat church until 1996. Grant was convicted in 1996 of tax evasion, and since his release from prison he has restarted his ministry.

He was married 3 times. His wife, Brenda Gayle Hayes, died on October 6, 2020. He has three adult children: daughter Misty and stepsons Barry and Mark Anderson.

== Education and degrees ==
As of August 2011, Grant's website stated the following about the minister's education and honorary degrees:

After attending Southwestern Assemblies of God Bible University, he started in the full-time ministry. He received his undergraduate degrees in English Literature and Religion, as well as his Master's Degree in History from Dallas Baptist University. He has two honorary degrees from Kingsway Bible University (Des Moines, Iowa) and the Colonial Academy (Chicago).

Paranormal investigator James Randi examined Grant's practices in his 1987 book, The Faith Healers. About Grant's degrees, Randi wrote:

. . . even Grant's college degree is phony. He claims that he obtained it from "Midstates Bible College" in Des Moines in 1972. He displays the diploma on his office wall. But Midstates wasn't then and isn't now accredited with the Iowa Department of Public Instruction, as all parochial and public schools are required to be. It wasn't recorded with the secretary of state's office in Iowa as a corporation; nor was it listed in the county recorder's office. It didn't even show up in the telephone directory.

Grant told a reporter in 1986 that he did not graduate from a seminary but, in Grant's words, had "more or less an honorary D.D. (doctor of divinity) degree" from Mid-States Bible College in Des Moines, Iowa, which later changed its name to Kingsway Christian College. "They take a formula of how many books you've written, how long you've been in the ministry, maybe how many times you've been on radio and TV," he said.

== Faith healing ==
Grant has denied being a faith healer, stating that "whatever healing there is, is a gift from God", for which he is merely "a mortal conduit".

== Tax evasion ==
In 1996, an Internal Revenue Service investigation into Grant's ministry resulted in Grant's imprisonment for tax evasion. He was found guilty of failing to report $375,000 in taxable income in the purchase of two homes, including his $1 million residence. An undercover video tape showed Grant admitting that he used $100,000 in 1988 from church members as a down payment on a $1.2 million home overlooking a Desoto, Texas, country club and not reporting it as income. Judge Joe Kendall criticized Grant by asking, "Did you watch the same videotape I watched?" He continued, "He's all over it admitting he's guilty. He swore to God under oath he is guilty". The judge sentenced Grant to 16 months in prison and a $30,000 fine, to be paid after his release, when he would also serve an additional year of probation. Kendall also ordered Grant to "perform 100 hours of community service, publish details of his arrest and sentence for everyone on his mailing list and provide complete, continuing financial reports to the court."

His wife was indicted on charges of blocking the IRS and evading taxes. Though she initially pleaded guilty, the judge allowed her to withdraw the plea and she was later acquitted. Following the conviction, Grant transferred the Eagles Nest Cathedral facility to T. D. Jakes, also a televangelist, who renamed it "The Potter's House".

== Eagles Nest Cathedral ==
Grant was released from prison on September 18, 1997, and has since restarted his ministry, again under the name Eagles Nest Cathedral.

Originally located in the eastern part of Dallas in the area known as Pleasant Grove", in August 2012, W.V. Grant purchased a historic property in downtown Dallas (the former home of "First Church of Christ, Scientist," located at 1508 Cadiz Street, Dallas, Texas 75201) where "The Eagle's Nest Cathedral" and Grant now hold almost nightly services normally lasting from 7:00 PM – 9:00 PM.

== Media coverage ==
1986–87: Scientific skeptic and professional stage magician James Randi reported that Grant had been supplied with notes concerning the ailments of audience members before the show, that he used a "sleight of hand" trick to make a person's leg appear to grow, and that he had members of the audience who walked into the event placed into wheelchairs beforehand and then, during the service, he asked them to stand and walk. Randi also claimed that Grant's wife first gathered information about members of the audience, which she relayed to her husband via slips of paper in a Bible he displayed during his presentations. "They're agnostics," Grant said of his critics in 1986, "Or even atheists."

1987: Chicago Tribune religion writer Bruce Buursma reported the experiences of one of Randi's fellow investigators, Andrew A. Skolnick, who was twice "healed" by Grant and once by televangelist faith healer Peter Popoff.

1991: Grant was investigated by ABC News and Trinity Foundation for an exposé report on Primetime Live (with Larry Lea and Robert Tilton). A 2006 opinion article in the Dallas Observer claimed that the examination of documents in various lawsuits revealed deceptive journalistic techniques were utilized by ABC News, and concluded that a key element of the televised Primetime Live report relating to Tilton was "bogus".

The Trinity Foundation also found photos of a naked Grant in his trash and published one in the centrefold of their satirical magazine, The Door.

1996: The Dallas Morning News reported that one of Grant's fundraising letters was apparently written by Gene Ewing, who heads a multi-million dollar marketing empire, writing donation letters for other evangelicals like Don Stewart and Robert Tilton.

2003: Atlanta television station WAGA-TV investigated Grant and found that Grant liked to arrive at his revivals early, hours before they were supposed to begin. WAGA reporters showed up early as well, with hidden cameras, and watched the preacher talk to several people already in the church. As it turned out, many of them were people Grant would later pick out of the crowd and "miraculously" announce their name and their disease." The report concluded that of three people Grant claimed to heal, two were in worse condition after, and one assisted Grant with the setup with no sign of the condition he claimed during the service. In addition, "healing the short leg" was a magic trick demonstrated on a reporter by magician James Randi.

2006: Richmond, Virginia television station WWBT-TV aired an investigation on Grant while he conducted faith healing services at the Richmond Christian Center.

2010: Free Inquiry, the magazine of the Council for Secular Humanism, discussed how Grant's act had changed little in the preceding twenty years and detailed his "miracles" at a venue.

2011: British mentalist Derren Brown produced a program "Miracles for Sale" broadcast on Channel 4. As part of the program, Brown and his team made two visits to Grant's church in Dallas. During the first visit, Grant claimed that "God" had told him the name of a member of Brown's team, but the name he gave out was a false one that the person had written on a contact card prior to the start of the service. This indicated that Grant's knowledge came from the card and not from any supernatural means. On their second visit, Grant performed his leg lengthening "miracle" on Brown himself. The footage showed Grant using the same shoe-manipulation technique that Brown had exposed earlier on the program.
