= Larry Lea =

American televangelist and pastor

- Born: Harold Lawrence Lea; January 30, 1951 (age 75); Texas, U.S.
- Occupations: pastor, televangelist
- Children: 3
- Website: https://larrylea.webs.com

Harold Lawrence Lea (born January 30, 1951) is an American pastor and televangelist in Rockwall, Texas.

== Early years ==
Lea graduated from Dallas Baptist University, where he met his first wife Melva. He completed his graduate work at Southwestern Baptist Theological Seminary in Fort Worth. Larry and Melva were married in 1972 and had three children. He became the youth pastor of Beverly Hills Baptist Church in Dallas, where the youth department grew from 40 to 1,000 participants. While pastoring Church on the Rock in Rockwall, Texas, Lea also served as Dean of Theological and Spiritual Affairs at Oral Roberts University.

== Church on the Rock ==
Following a stint as an itinerant preacher in the late 1970s, Lea was invited to pastor Church on the Rock in 1980 with 12 people in Rockwall, Texas, a suburb of Dallas. Within 5 years, the congregation had increased to over 5,000. In 1986, Lea began to travel again, holding what he called "Prayer Clinics" and later, "Prayer Rallies" or "Prayer Breakthroughs". Also, that year marked the beginning of Lea's television program, called Change Your Life. Also, that year, Lea released his first book, the best-seller Could You Not Tarry One Hour?, which was his teaching on The Lord's Prayer. He also began a partnership group where his partners were referred to as "Prayer Warriors".

In June 1990, Lea stepped aside as pastor to oversee Church on the Rock, which was a group of churches that was called a "virtual denomination" according to Christianity Today.

== Controversies ==
In October 1990, televangelist Larry Lea held a three-day "Prayer Breakthrough" crusade at San Francisco's Civic Auditorium, aiming to "exorcise sin" from the city. The event drew about 6,500 attendees but was met with significant opposition from approximately 1,500 demonstrators, including gay rights activists, pro-choice advocates, and Wiccans. Protesters accused Lea of promoting intolerance and bigotry, leading to heightened tensions and concerns about potential violence. As a result, plans for a large-scale prayer march through the city were canceled.

A year later, ABC's PrimeTime Live aired an exposé involving Lea and fellow Dallas-area televangelists W.V. Grant and Robert Tilton. The incident involving Lea came as a result of his fundraising appeals, questions as to how much money was going to mentioned projects (specifically a program involving helping start churches in Poland), and accusations that Lea implied a fire at one of his homes left his family almost destitute even though they still had a five-million-dollar home in the Dallas area.

== Aftermath ==
Lea's organization had grown so quickly, he made the decision to allow the National Religious Broadcasters financial integrity arm, EFICOM (Ethics and Financial Integrity Commission), to audit his ministry to look into the charges. While EFICOM would determine he had been delinquent in sending his financial information, the group determined that Lea had not misused the funds for the Poland project. The EFICOM committee also accused ABC News of misleading Lea about the interview's purpose and ignoring "significant facts"; such as signed affidavits from Polish church officials that would have confirmed Lea's claims. After ending his Change Your Life broadcasts in December 1991 following the exposé, Lea had returned to the airwaves by May 1992 with a show titled America, Let's Pray.

His credibility and prominence in the charismatic community evaporated (though not as quickly as Tilton's), as he traveled with Morris Cerullo at the latter's crusades in the mid-1990s. Lea also claimed that he suffered a relapse of bipolar disorder. In 1994, he took a position as a pastor in San Diego. This lasted until 1997.

After 27 years of marriage with children, Larry ran off with his church secretary and then Larry filed for divorce in April 1999. During the divorce, his wife attended Southwestern Baptist Theological Seminary. Lea's son John started the Life Church in Rockwall, Texas in the same Dallas suburb where Larry and his ex-wife began Church on the Rock in 1980. Larry took over Christian Faith Center after Jerry Baynard prophesied that San Diego would be a major light and the church changed hands. Lea has since remarried to his former church secretary and has returned to the Rockwall area.

The Church on the Rock main campus was later sold to Lake Pointe Baptist Church, a Southern Baptist megachurch in the Rockwall area which relocated to the site and renamed itself Lake Pointe Church; while the church itself moved to the nearby Rowlett area and was renamed Church in the City in January 2007.
