= Eli Regalado =

American pastor

- Born: Eligio Peter Regalado; 1979 or 1980 (age 45–46)
- Occupation: Pastor
- Known for: INDXcoin

Eligio Peter Regalado (or Eli Regalado) is an American pastor who is known for defrauding investors through the cryptocurrency INDXcoin.

== Career ==
Regalado claims that he felt a calling to become a pastor when he was 22, while serving a prison sentence for boosting cars. At that time, he worked in sales for various companies, before shifting towards marketing.

In 2010, Regalado was hired as a consultant for Icosa Magazine, a Denver-based publication.

In 2013, Regalado founded Mad Hatter Agency, a marketing firm working predominantly on crowdfunding campaigns. The agency would later be renamed Grace Led Marketing.

Regalado preached to a congregation through his online church, Victorious Grace Church, which he founded in 2020. Regalado and his wife were the only two listed employees of the church.

=== INDXcoin ===
Regalado and his wife, Kaitlyn, were accused of running a cryptocurrency scam. The pair solicited $3.4 million from 300 investors through the Kingdom Wealth Exchange, a cryptocurrency exchange affiliated with Regalado. The couple went on to spend at least $1.3 million of the sum on a home renovation, which, according to Regalado, “the Lord” told them to do. Regalado initially began preaching about INDXcoin and its exchange in August 2022, after having paid $100,000 to two developers of Sumcoin to create INDXcoin. The INDXcoin token was positioned as a "utility" to gain access to a branded "Kingdom Wealth Community", in an attempt to avoid accusations of the coin being a security. The exchange and token were shut down in November 2023. In January 2024, the couple was barred from selling securities before their trial and had their assets frozen. Regalado would miss a February 2024 court date, instead attending a church conference in Zambia where he gave sermons on God and his cryptocurrency. Also in that month, the securities fraud claim was amended to include twelve additional defendants, including pastor Jesse Duplantis.

In July 2025, Regalado, along with his wife, was indicted on 40 counts of theft, securities fraud, and racketeering. The couple was banned from selling crypto or other securities for 20 years and was ordered to pay back the $3.4 million. A September 2025 ruling in a Denver District Court determined that Regalado had "committed securities fraud in violation of the Colorado Securities Act."

== Personal life ==
Regalado has a sister. Before marrying his wife Kaitlyn, Regalado was married to and divorced from his ex-wife, Nicole Brown.

Prior to crypto-related ventures, Regalado had a history of criminal activity, including having plead guilty to theft in Jefferson County in 2000, pleading guilty to third-degree assault in connection with a 2001 incident, pleading guilty to a DUI in 2004, and Regalado was arrested in 1999 for aggravated motor vehicle theft, for which he was sentenced to eight years in prison.

== See also ==
- Cryptocurrency and crime
