= Pogo (musician) =

Australian electronic musician (born 1988)

- Also known as: Pogo, Fagottron
- Born: Christopher Nicholas Bertke; 26 July 1988 (age 38); Cape Town, Cape Province, South Africa
- Origin: Cape Town, Perth
- Genres: Electronic; plunderphonics; deep house; glitch hop
- Occupations: Musician, sound recordist
- Years active: 2005–present
- Website: pogomix.net nickbertke.com

Christopher Nicholas "Nick" Bertke (born 26 July 1988), better known by his stage name Pogo, which is symbolized by an icon of a rabbit, is a South African-born Australian electronic musician. Much of his work consists of recording small sounds, quotes, and melodies from films, TV programmes or other sources, and sequencing the sounds together to form a new piece of music (a genre also known as plunderphonics). A number of Pogo's works consist almost entirely of the sounds he samples, with few or no additional music or sound samples.

== Career ==
Pogo has produced tracks using samples from films and TV shows such as Pulp Fiction. He has also sampled from other sources, such as field recordings for his project Remix the World. Remix the World was an ambitious project, consisting of all original content. Bertke shot real-world footage and then used those sounds and images to capture the essence of the places he visited. The Real World Remix was shot in Kenya, Brooklyn, Johannesburg, Bhutan, and Perth.

Bertke is best known for his use of video sampling to produce music videos, which he uploads on the video-sharing website YouTube. As of October 2017, his most popular YouTube video is Alice, made of samples of Disney's animated film Alice in Wonderland, with more than 30 million views. In 2010, his music video Gardyn, created from footage of his mother working in her garden, was juried along with 24 other YouTube videos for an exhibition at the Guggenheim Museum in New York City. On 29 September 2016, Pogo released a song called "Trumpular" on SoundCloud which consisted of quotes from Republican nominee, and later President, Donald Trump. Later, in 2019, he made a music video called "Homarge", based on The Simpsons (mostly from the episode "Simpson and Delilah"), which gained over a million views. On August 27, 2021, Pogo released a remix called "Strangerous", taking voices and sounds from Stranger Things, which has become Pogo's second most viewed on SoundCloud, and on November 5, 2021, he released "Cabin Fever", which samples Muppet Treasure Island.

Pogo's music is used on the conservative YouTube talk show Louder with Crowder, hosted by Steven Crowder, and is used as bumper music to transition in and out of commercial breaks.

On 7 January 2022, Bertke's latest album Cosmoluxe was released to Bandcamp and to YouTube on the 11th. The album includes remixes of Stranger Things, Muppet Treasure Island, Chitty Chitty Bang Bang and Spyro the Dragon. 17 February that year saw the release of the track Sunflowers to SoundCloud. 16 March saw the release of his most recent track Have Some Jelly, which was later removed although reuploads exist. After that, Pogo was put under an indefinite hiatus.

In late 2024, he relaunched his pre-Pogo website to include his photography, design and sound recording work. News of this became widely known the following April. Even though there has been no major activity on his Pogo accounts, he has the YouTube and Instagram pages linked on the site. Small updates to his YouTube include a new profile picture in March 2026, the inclusion of releases previously available on his “topic” channel and replies to various comments on his videos.

== Personal life ==
On his September 2011 US tour, Bertke was arrested and taken into custody for three weeks due to the lack of a proper work visa, and was prohibited from re-entering the United States until 2021.

In January 2020, Pogo's YouTube channel was hacked and hijacked by an unknown user, who renamed the channel "Ethereum 2.0 Foundation" and privated all the videos on the channel. The hacker then started a scam livestream promoting Ethereum cryptocurrency, and claiming that any amount of crypto sent to them during the stream would be multiplied and sent back. Pogo took to Twitter to let fans know that he was aware of the hack and has contacted YouTube for help. The hacked channel was terminated by YouTube on January 17, and Pogo remained without a channel for four days while fans created accounts hosting temporary re-uploads of his videos and music. On January 22, YouTube restored the account, including his view counts, subscribers, and comment sections.

== Controversies ==
Bertke was criticized for a 2015 video that derided feminists as gold diggers and "making misogynist arguments against women's rights". He later claimed that it was made "to impersonate the radical right".

In a YouTube livestream that was uploaded in 2016, Bertke stated that he has a "fairly thorough dislike of homosexuals". In the same video and on the topic of the Orlando nightclub shooting, a terrorist attack at a gay bar in Florida in 2016, he said, "It amazes me to see the West welcoming a culture through the floodgates that wants gays dead. I think that's fantastic". Bertke later claimed to not have any hate for the gay community and also claimed Asperger syndrome and bipolar disorder as contributing factors. He stated that the video was made in bad taste and that he never intended for it to go public, although he also stated that he was trying to "impersonate the far-right and create hysteria", noting that the video was made around the time of the 2016 American election. YourEDM compared his "homophobic rhetoric" to the 2015 video, which he similarly tried to explain as a social experiment. The Verge described this explanation as a transparent attempt at plausible deniability.

== Discography ==
Pogo discography
- Studio albums: 12
- Extended plays: 9
- Soundtrack albums: 2
- Singles: 16
- Music videos: 80

The following is a comprehensive discography of Australian electronic musician Pogo. His discography comprises twelve studio albums, nine extended-plays, two soundtrack albums, sixteen singles, three mixes, eighty music videos, among others.

== Albums ==
=== Studio ===
List of studio albums, with selected details, peak chart positions and certifications
Title	Details	Peak chart positions										Certifications (thresholds)	References
Title	Details	FRA	AUS	AUT	BEL	CAN	GER	NL	SWI	UK	US	Certifications (thresholds)	References
Twilight Thoughts	Released: 29 October 2006; Label: Pogomix; Format: digital download	—	—	—	—	—	—	—	—	—	—		
Texturebox	Released: 30 December 2010; Label: Pogomix; Format: digital download	—	—	—	—	—	—	—	—	—	—		
Wonderpuff	Released: 27 June 2011; Label: Pogomix; Format: digital download	—	—	—	—	—	—	—	—	—	—		
Forgotten Fudge	Released: 2 November 2013; Label: Pogomix; Format: digital download	—	—	—	—	—	—	—	—	—	—		
Star Charts	Released: 22 December 2014; Label: Pogomix; Format: digital download	—	—	—	—	—	—	—	—	—	—		
Kindred Shadow	Released: 11 June 2015; Label: Pogomix; Format: CD, digital download	—	—	—	—	—	—	—	—	—	—		
Weightless	Released: 30 December 2016; Label: Pogomix; Format: CD, digital download	—	—	—	—	—	—	—	—	—	—		
Ascend	Released: 22 February 2018; Label: Pogomix; Format: digital download	—	—	—	—	—	—	—	—	—	—		
Quantum Field	Released: 29 December 2018; Label: Pogomix; Format: digital download	—	—	—	—	—	—	—	—	—	—		
Valley of Shadow	Released: 4 March 2020; Label: Pogomix; Format: digital download	—	—	—	—	—	—	—	—	—	—		
Cultures	Released: 28 December 2020; Label: Pogomix; Format: digital download	—	—	—	—	—	—	—	—	—	—		
Cosmoluxe	Released: 7 January 2022; Label: Pogomix; Format: digital download	—	—	—	—	—	—	—	—	—	—		
"—" denotes a recording that did not chart or was not released in that territory.													

== Soundtrack albums ==
List of studio albums, with selected details, peak chart positions and certifications
Title	Details	Peak chart positions										Certifications (thresholds)	References
Title	Details	FRA	AUS	AUT	BEL	CAN	GER	NL	SWI	UK	US	Certifications (thresholds)	References
Kippo: The Original Soundtrack	Released: 11 January 2007; Label: Pogomix; Format: digital download	—	—	—	—	—	—	—	—	—	—		
Kippo And Kate: The Original Soundtrack	Released: 17 September 2007; Label: Pogomix; Format: digital download	—	—	—	—	—	—	—	—	—	—		
"—" denotes a recording that did not chart or was not released in that territory.													

== Extended plays ==
Title	Details	References
Wonderland	Released: 28 May 2007; Label: Pogomix; Format: digital download	
Broken Beats	Released: 2008; Label: Pogomix; Format: digital download	
Table Scraps	Released: 2008; Label: Pogomix; Format: digital download	
Weave and Wish	Released: 22 March 2009; Label: Pogomix; Format: digital download	
Deeper Down The Rabbit Hole	Released: 30 November 2010; Label: Pogomix; Format: digital download	
Fluctuate	Released: 5 January 2014; Label: Pogomix; Format: digital download	
Perfect Chaos	Released: 21 May 2014; Label: Pogomix; Format: digital download	
Younghood	Released: 8 June 2014; Label: Pogomix; Format: digital download	
Unity	Released: 18 February 2020; Label: Pogomix; Format: digital download	

== Singles ==
The following list is going off of the singles available on Spotify

Title	Year	Peak chart positions										Certifications (thresholds)	Album
Title	Year	FRA	BEL (WA)	CAN	FIN	JPN	NL	SPA	SWI	UK	US Dance	Certifications (thresholds)	Album
"Joburg Jam"	2011	—	—	—	—	—	—	—	—	—	—		—N/a
"Grover Groove"	2013	—	—	—	—	—	—	—	—	—	—		—N/a
"Kenya Chords"	2013	—	—	—	—	—	—	—	—	—	—		—N/a
"Prop My Sky"	2013	—	—	—	—	—	—	—	—	—	—		—N/a
"Reverso Poppins"	2013	—	—	—	—	—	—	—	—	—	—		—N/a
"Jaaam"	2013	—	—	—	—	—	—	—	—	—	—		—N/a
"Wizard of Meh"	2013	—	—	—	—	—	—	—	—	—	—		—N/a
"Kane"	2013	—	—	—	—	—	—	—	—	—	—		—N/a
"Pirrouette"	2013	—	—	—	—	—	—	—	—	—	—		—N/a
"Paper's Out"	2013	—	—	—	—	—	—	—	—	—	—		—N/a
"R&I"	2013	—	—	—	—	—	—	—	—	—	—		—N/a
"Shroom'd"	2013	—	—	—	—	—	—	—	—	—	—		—N/a
"Bloom"	2013	—	—	—	—	—	—	—	—	—	—		—N/a
Be Kind To Your Donkey	2019	—	—	—	—	—	—	—	—	—	—		—N/a
"Living Island"	2019	—	—	—	—	—	—	—	—	—	—		—N/a
"People"	2019	—	—	—	—	—	—	—	—	—	—		—N/a

== Music videos ==
All videos are found on Pogo's YouTube Channel

Title	Year	Director(s)	Film	Album
"Alice"	2007	Nick Bertke	Alice In Wonderland	Wonderland
"Anna"	2007	Nick Bertke	The King & I	Table Scraps
"Splugenshitter"	2008	Nick Bertke	—N/a	Weave and Wish
"Alohomora"	2009	Nick Bertke	Harry Potter	Weave and Wish
"White Magic"	2009	Nick Bertke	The Sword & The Stone	Weave and Wish
"Expialidocious"	2009	Nick Bertke	Mary Poppins	—N/a
"Mary's Magic"	2009	Nick Bertke	The Secret Garden	—N/a
"Scrumdidlyumptious"	2009	Nick Bertke	Mary Poppins	—N/a
"Bangarang"	2009	Nick Bertke	Hook	—N/a
"Upular"	2009	Nick Bertke	Up	—N/a
"Skynet Syphonic"	2010	Nick Bertke	Terminator 2: Judgement Day	—N/a
"Gardyn"	2010	Nick Bertke	—N/a	—N/a
"Toyz Noize"	2010	Nick Bertke	Toy Story	—N/a
"Buzzwing"	2010	Nick Bertke	Toy Story	—N/a
"Crimson"	2010	Nick Bertke	Dexter	—N/a
"Wishery"	2010	Nick Bertke	Snow White and The Seven Dwarves	—N/a
"Whisperlude"	2010	Nick Bertke	A Little Princess	—N/a
"Joburg Jam"	2011	Nick Bertke	—N/a	—N/a
"Murmurs of Middle Earth"	2011	Nick Bertke	Lord of The Rings	—N/a
"Living Island"	2011	Nick Bertke	H.R Puffnstuf	—N/a
"Bloom"	2011	Nick Bertke	various	—N/a
"Mellow Brick Road"	2011	Reed Gauthier	The Wizard of Oz	—N/a
"Zoo Zoo"	2011	Nick Bertke	The Mighty Boosh	—N/a
"Davyd"	2011	Nick Bertke	A.I: Artificial Intelligence	—N/a
"Kadinchey"	2011	Nick Bertke	—N/a	—N/a
"Perthection"	2011	Nick Bertke	—N/a	—N/a
"Jaaam"	2011	Nick Bertke	The Fresh Prince of Bel-Air	—N/a
"Eleven"	2012	Nick Bertke	—N/a	—N/a
"Sugarella"	2012	Nick Bertke	Cinderella	—N/a
"Boo Bass"	2012	Nick Bertke	Monsters, Inc.	—N/a
"Lead Breakfast"	2012	Nick Bertke	Pulp Fiction	—N/a
"Wizard of Meh"	2012	Nick Bertke	The Wizard of Oz	—N/a
"Vasna"	2012	Nick Bertke	—N/a	—N/a
"Scoobystep"	2012	Nick Bertke	Big Top Scooby-Doo!	—N/a
"The Ghan"	2013	Nick Bertke	—N/a	—N/a
"Indian Pacific"	2013	Nick Bertke	—N/a	—N/a
"Kenya Chords"	2013	Nick Bertke	—N/a	—N/a
"Roarcraft"	2013	Nick Bertke	World of Warcraft	—N/a
"What I Likes"	2013	Nick Bertke	Mary Poppins	—N/a
"Catchatronic"	2013	Nick Bertke	Pokémon	—N/a
"Aye Aye"	2013	Nick Bertke	—N/a	—N/a
"LG Home Appliances Mashup"	2013	Nick Bertke	—N/a	—N/a
"Muppet Mash"	2013	Nick Bertke	Sesame Street	—N/a
"J'adore Juin"	2014	Nick Bertke	—N/a	—N/a
"I Want..."	2014	Nick Bertke	Willy Wonka & the Chocolate Factory	Younghood
"Nicey Nicey"	2014	Nick Bertke	The Mighty Boosh	Younghood
"Perth Milks It"	2014	Nick Bertke	—N/a	—N/a
"Time Machine"	2014	Nick Bertke	Back to the Future	Younghood
"Vision"	2014	Nick Bertke	—N/a	—N/a
"G'Day, G'Day (What'slively In Sydney)"	2014	Nick Bertke, Whatslively	—N/a	—N/a
"The Trouble"	2014	JEESH	various	Kindred Shadow
"Hermione Mix"	2014	JEESH	Harry Potter	Star Charts
"Psycho Soup"	2014	Nick Bertke	Borderlands	—N/a
"One Day With You"	2015	Nick Bertke	—N/a	Star Charts
"Forget"	2015	Nick Bertke	various	Kindred Shadow
"Hoo Ba Ba Kanda"	2015	Nick Bertke	Robert Tilton	Weightless
"Smooth Cream"	2015	Nick Bertke	—N/a	—N/a
"Bite Sized Candies"	2016	Nick Bertke	M&M's	—N/a
"Trumpular"	2016	Nick Bertke	Donald Trump	Weightless
"Data & Picard"	2016	Nick Bertke	Star Trek: The Next Generation	Weightless
"Grow Fonder"	2017	Nick Bertke	Robin Hood	Ascend
"Gruve"	2017	Nick Bertke	Despicable Me	—N/a
"Boy & Bear"	2017	Nick Bertke	Pooh's Grand Adventure	Ascend
"Fmaa"	2017	Nick Bertke	—N/a	—N/a
"Carpet Ride"	2017	Nick Bertke	Aladdin	Ascend
"Happee"	2018	Nick Bertke	Sesame Street and Chitty Chitty Bang Bang	Quantum Field
"redruM"	2018	Nick Bertke	The Shining	Valley of Shadow
"Reach"	2019	OneSimpleGamer	various	Quantum Field
"Wings For Dreamers"	2019	DerpsMcPineapple	Oliver!	Quantum Field
"Absoblume"	2019	Nick Bertke	My Fair Lady	Unity
"Bambino"	2019	Nick Bertke	Bambi	Unity
"Hot Ziggity"	2019	Nick Bertke	Putt-Putt Saves The Zoo	—N/a
"Homarge"	2019	Nick Bertke	The Simpsons	Unity
"HorrorLand"	2019	Nick Bertke	Goosebumps: Escape From Horrorland	Unity
"Do You"	2020	Nick Bertke	—N/a	—N/a
"Doubtfire"	2020	Nick Bertke	Mrs. Doubtfire	Cultures
"Tiggerific"	2020	Nick Bertke	The Tigger Movie	—N/a
"Mazel Tov"	2020	Nick Bertke	Fiddler on The Roof	Cultures
"Yoga Special"	2021	Nick Bertke	Whose Line Is It Anyway? and Close Encounters of The Third Kind	—N/a
"Strangerous"	2022	Nick Bertke	Stranger Things	Cosmoluxe

== Other ==
=== Mixes ===
Year	Title	Format	Label
2011	Pogo Live Mix 7-14-12	Live stream	Pogomix
2016	Pogo Live Mix (November 2016)	Live stream/video	Pogomix
2019	POGO Live 18.01.19	Live stream/video	Pogomix

== See also ==
- Akufen – Canadian electronic musician
- The Avalanches – Australian electronic music group
- Deep Forest – French electronic music project
- DJ Shadow – American DJ and record producer
- Todd Edwards – American musician
- Kutiman – Israeli musical artist
