= Peter Popoff =

German-born American televangelist (born 1946)

- Born: Peter George Popoff; July 2, 1946 (age 80); Berlin, Allied-occupied Germany
- Occupation: Televangelist
- Years active: 1977–present
- Spouse: Elizabeth A. Armstrong (m. 1971)
- Children: 3

Peter George Popoff (born July 2, 1946) is an American televangelist, charlatan, debunked clairvoyant, and faith healer. He was exposed in 1986 by stage magician James Randi for using a concealed earpiece to receive radio messages from his wife, who gave him the names, addresses, and ailments of audience members during Popoff-led religious services. Popoff falsely claimed that God revealed this information to him so that Popoff could cure them through faith healing.

He went bankrupt the next year, but made a comeback in the late 1990s. Beginning in the mid-2000s, Popoff bought TV time to promote "Miracle Spring Water" on late-night infomercials, and referred to himself as a prophet. "Miracle Spring Water" promotions, with testimonials by people claiming cures from illness and financial gains attributed to Popoff's "miracle" water, were still running on TV channels in the United States and Canada in 2025, and were running in the UK, leading to a fine by communications regulator Ofcom for breaching the Broadcasting Code.

== Early life and career ==
Popoff was born in Occupied Berlin (Note: Various sources state that Popoff was born in East Berlin or West Berlin. Berlin was not actually divided into East and West until 1949, three years after Popoff was born.) on July 2, 1946, the son of George and Gerda Popoff. His father, an evangelical pastor, was originally Bulgarian. The family fled the country during the Communist regime. As a child, Popoff emigrated with his family to the United States, where he attended Chaffey College before transferring to the University of California, Santa Barbara, from which he graduated in 1970.

Popoff's father preached at revival meetings throughout the United States. Beginning in 1960, Popoff also began making appearances as a preacher. Billed as "the Miracle Boy Evangelist" in print advertisements, the ads also claimed he was born in a West Berlin bomb shelter, and had been rescued from a Siberian prison camp. The powers he claimed included the abilities to heal the sick and foretell the future.

Popoff married his wife, Elizabeth, in August 1971, and the couple settled in Upland, California. He then began his television ministry that, by the early 1980s, was being broadcast nationally. His miraculous "curing" of chronic and incurable medical conditions became a central attraction of his sermons. Popoff would tell attendees suffering from a variety of illnesses to "break free of the Devil" by throwing their prescription pills onto the stage. Many would obey, tossing away bottles of digitalis, nitroglycerine, and other important maintenance medications. Popoff would also "command" supplicants in wheelchairs to "rise and break free". They would stand and walk without assistance, to the joyous cheers of the faithful. Critics later documented that the recipients of these dramatic "cures" were fully ambulatory people who had been seated in wheelchairs by Popoff's assistants prior to broadcasts.

In 1985, Popoff began soliciting donations for a program to provide Christian Bibles to citizens of the Soviet Union by attaching them to helium-filled balloons and floating them into the country. When skeptics asked him to prove that the money he had collected had in fact been spent on Bibles and balloons, Popoff staged a burglary at his own headquarters. On subsequent broadcasts, he tearfully begged for additional donations to help repair the damage.

== Investigation by James Randi ==
At the height of his popularity in the 1980s, Popoff would accurately announce home addresses and specific illnesses of audience members during his "healing sermons", a feat that he implied was due to divine revelation and "God-given ability". In 1986, the Committee for Skeptical Inquiry charged that Popoff was using electronic transmissions to receive his information; Popoff denied it, insisting that the messages were divinely revealed. Skeptic groups distributed pamphlets explaining how Popoff's feats could be accomplished without any sort of divine intervention. Popoff branded his critics "tools of the Devil".

Popoff's methods were definitively exposed in 1986 by the magician and skeptic James Randi and his associate Steve Shaw, an illusionist known professionally as Banachek, with technical assistance from the crime scene analyst and electronics expert Alexander Jason. With a scanner radio, Jason was able to demonstrate that Popoff's wife, Elizabeth, was using a radio transmitter to broadcast information that she and her aides had culled from prayer request cards filled out by audience members. Popoff received the transmissions via a receiver and earpiece he was wearing and repeated the information to astonished audience members. Jason produced video segments interspersing the intercepted radio transmissions with Popoff's "miraculous" pronouncements.

Randi also planted accomplices in Popoff's audiences, including a man dressed as a woman whom Popoff "cured" of uterine cancer at a meeting in Detroit in 1984. Randi and Shaw recorded Elizabeth describing a woman to Popoff as "that big nigger in the back", and warning him, "Keep your hands off those tits ... I'm watching you." At another session, Elizabeth and her aides were heard laughing uncontrollably at the physical appearance of a man suffering from advanced testicular cancer.

In May 1986, Randi presented one of Jason's videos on The Tonight Show Starring Johnny Carson. Popoff initially denied Randi's accusations and accused NBC of "...[hiring] an actress to impersonate Mrs. Popoff on a doctored videotape". Eventually, Popoff admitted the existence of the radio device, but claimed that Elizabeth only "occasionally" gave him "the name of a person who needs special prayers". He added that "almost everybody" knew about the radio communication system. Although donations had exceeded over half a million dollars monthly, his ministry's viewer ratings and donations declined significantly after the Carson airing, and in September 1987, he declared bankruptcy, listing more than 790 unpaid creditors, a ministry debt of over $1 million, and personal debts of almost half that amount. Popoff's attorney, William Simon, "attributed the collapse of his ministry to financial mismanagement more than to disclosures about Popoff," according to the Los Angeles Times. Jason's video footage was also aired on the Nova episode "Secrets of the Psychics" in 1991. The episode was released on video as part of a lesson in critical thinking.

Larry Skelton, a former organist of Popoff from 1965 to 1990, and for Peter's father before that, said: "When you're praying for the sick, it's through the Holy Spirit, and there's [sic] some times that it works freely, and then there are other times when the Spirit's just not there." He went on to say that "on the days it didn't show, you still had to pay for the auditorium, so you needed to help the Holy Spirit along." Skelton claimed that he had seen miracles; for instance, a believer whose short leg grew six inches to match the length of his normal leg.

== Resurgence ==
In 1998, The Washington Post reported that Popoff was making a comeback, seeking to jump-start his ministry by repackaging himself for an African American audience and buying time on the Black Entertainment Television network. Popoff, along with Don Stewart and Robert Tilton, received "criticism from those who say that preachers with a long trail of disillusioned followers have no place on a network that holds itself out as a model of entrepreneurship for the black community".

A February 2007 Inside Edition segment reported that Popoff's new infomercials depicted him "healing the sick" in a manner identical to his methods prior to James Randi's exposé. Victims were interviewed, including a married couple who charged that Popoff had taken "thousands of dollars" from them. Popoff refused to comment. "Flim flam is his profession," Randi explained to reporter Matt Meaghan. "That's what he does best. He's very good at it, and naturally he's going to go back to it." In May 2007, ABC's 20/20 focused on Popoff's comeback and explored the lives of a few people who felt cheated. Various other media outlets have run similar stories. In July 2008, a Nanaimo, British Columbia, resident was reimbursed by Popoff after she went public with her concerns over his fundraising tactics.

In 2008, the UK broadcasting regulator Ofcom issued strong warnings to broadcasters for transmitting Popoff's material, which the regulator felt promoted his products "in such a way as to target potential susceptible and vulnerable viewers". These programs included offers of free "Miracle Manna" that allegedly provided health and financial miracles.

In 2009, Popoff began running advertisements in UK periodicals offering a free cross containing "blessed water" and "holy sand". The water, he claimed, was drawn from a spring near Chernobyl, Ukraine (the site of the 1986 nuclear reactor disaster). Animals and humans drinking from the spring were purportedly spared radiation sickness. Responders to the ad received a small wooden cross bearing the inscription "Jerusalem" and a solicitation for donations, followed by numerous additional solicitation letters.

Popoff was designated by the James Randi Educational Foundation (JREF) as one of its recipients of the 2011 Pigasus Award for fraudulent practices, along with Mehmet Oz (from The Dr. Oz Show) and CVS Pharmacy. "Debt cancellation is part of God's plan", according to Popoff, who taught that God would respond to prayer and seed-faith by providing financial blessing. Credit.com wrote a blog post concerning Popoff's claims.

In September 2015, Michael Marshall of the Good Thinking Society (GTS) documented Popoff's latest promises of "fabulous extreme fortune" and "miracles" in exchange for donations to his organization. At a London gathering, the GTS filmed Popoff "healing" a woman supposedly "wracked with pain", though Marshall and a colleague had previously seen her—in no obvious distress—handing out pens and questionnaires to audience members. Soon after the "healing", they watched her quietly leave the room.

In the mid-2000s, Popoff began to offer "Miracle Spring Water" on late-night infomercials in the US, Canada, the UK, Australia, and New Zealand. Respondents were promised miraculous protection from disease and disability, along with financial prosperity (which might include "divine money transfers directly into your account"), if they slept with the water for one night before drinking it, then prayed over the empty bottle and sent it back to Popoff—with a donation. A deluge of solicitation letters and token enclosures would follow, requesting more donations in exchange for miracles. Popoff also started referring to himself as a prophet.

Popoff's operation had functioned as a for-profit company until 2006, when it merged with a small church in Farmers Branch, Texas, called Word for the World, which operated out of a storefront. Now classified as a church, Popoff's corporation no longer had to report its annual income or his salary to the IRS. When a reporter from GQ attempted to visit this church on a Sunday morning in late 2016, he found a deserted parking lot in an industrial park with no church sign visible on the outside.

Because of Popoff's history of fraud and financial irregularities, his "People United For Christ" organization earned a "Did Not Disclose" rating with the Better Business Bureau (BBB), indicating its refusal to provide information that would enable BBB to determine whether the group adheres to its "Standards for Charity Accountability".

Popoff's longtime assistants, Reeford and Pamela Sherrell, also began a televised Texas-based ministry, with Reeford using the name Pastor Lee Sherrell. Like Popoff, they used the offer of a religious trinket (a free prayer cloth) to compile an address list. Once a follower requested the prayer cloth and provided their address, letters requesting money were dispatched.

Researcher and bioethics expert Fred M. Frohock cited Popoff as "one of many egregious instances of fake healing." Ole Anthony of the Trinity Foundation, founded in 1987 to research the claims of televangelists, said, "Most of these guys are fooled by their own theology"—referring to other televangelists such as Joel Osteen and T. D. Jakes—but in the case of Popoff, "he's fundamentally evil, because he knows he's a con man."

As of 2025, Popoff was broadcasting and advertising his miracle spring water on The Word Network, which was fined £150,000 in the UK for broadcasting Popoff's claims. They were considered to be a serious breach of the UK Broadcasting Code by regulator Ofcom, which "considered that these claims related to viewers' health and wealth and such claims had the potential to cause harm".

== Financial details ==
Popoff was collecting almost US$4 million per year in the late 1980s, according to Randi. In 2003, his "ministry" received over $9.6 million, and in 2005, over $23 million. In that year, he and his wife were paid a combined salary of nearly $1 million, while two of his children received over $180,000 each. Financial data is not available for Popoff's ministry since 2005 because Peter Popoff Ministries changed from a for-profit business to a religious organization in 2006, making it exempt from tax. Popoff purchased a home in Bradbury, California, for $4.5 million in 2007. He drove Porsche and Mercedes-Benz cars.

== In popular culture ==
The radio transmitter incident was parodied in the 1989 movie Fletch Lives.

The 1992 Steve Martin dramedy Leap of Faith was inspired by Popoff's fraudulent ministry, and demonstrated a number of the techniques Popoff and other televangelist scammers use to create the illusion of divine intervention. A 2012 Broadway musical adaptation of the same title was nominated for the Tony Award for Best Musical.

Popoff was also the inspiration for a character in the 2012 thriller film Red Lights, a psychic who uses information fed to him via a hidden earpiece to persuade the audience at his shows that he is receiving personal details psychically. The script includes Elizabeth Popoff's infamous line, "Hello Petey, can you hear me? If you can't, you're in trouble", almost verbatim.

James Randi's exposure of Popoff's fraudulent technique was featured in a segment of episode seven of season 21 of Mysteries at the Museum.

== Publications ==
- 3 Steps to Answered Prayer. Faith Messenger Publications (1981) ISBN 0938544101 (91 pages)
- Calamities, Catastrophes, and Chaos. Faith Messenger Publications (1980) ISBN 0938544012
- Demons At Your Doorstep. Faith Messenger Publications (1982) ISBN 0938544136 (50 pages)
- Dreams: God's Language for Life More Abundantly. Publisher: People United For Christ (1989) ASIN B000NSMW2S (88 pages)
- Forecasts for 1987. (1984) ASIN B000B8K0MY (33 page booklet)
- God Has Promised You Divine Wealth
- God's Abundant Blessings
- Guaranteed Answered Prayer
- Prosperity Thinking
- Releasing the Power of the Holy Spirit in Your Life
- Six Things Satan Uses to Rob You of God's Abundant Blessings. Faith Messenger Publications (1982) ISBN 093854411X (93 pages)
