= Ole Anthony =

American minister and religious investigator (1938–2021)

Ole Edward Anthony (October 3, 1938 – April 16, 2021) was an American minister, religious investigator and satirist. Anthony was the editor of The Wittenburg Door, a magazine of Christian satire. He was head of the Trinity Foundation, and in that capacity was involved in investigating the financial activities and alleged misappropriations of televangelists.

== Biography ==
Anthony was born on October 3, 1938, in St. Peter, Minnesota. He was reared in the Lutheran faith. He served in the U.S. Air Force from 1956 until December 1959, as a "special weapons maintenance technician" and had top-secret clearance, receiving the Good Conduct Medal and two "outstanding unit" awards.

Anthony's investigative work into the fundraising tactics of big-money televangelists first came to national attention in 1991 following a Primetime Live hidden-camera investigation of televangelists. Anthony portrayed himself—a Dallas minister of a small church trying to learn how big-money ministries work—in the segment on fellow East Dallas minister Robert Tilton. Anthony and the Trinity Foundation were instrumental in providing evidence for the many state and Federal investigations of Tilton in the years that followed, and he was often interviewed by reporters in preparations for stories on other televangelists. He was also the subject of a lengthy profile in the December 6, 2004, issue of The New Yorker.

He was a close friend of writer and comedian Joe Bob Briggs, who is also a member of the Trinity Foundation.

Former members of the group have been critical of the foundation and Anthony.

Ole Anthony died on April 16, 2021, after being diagnosed with lung cancer in 2017.
