= The Wittenburg Door =

American magazine

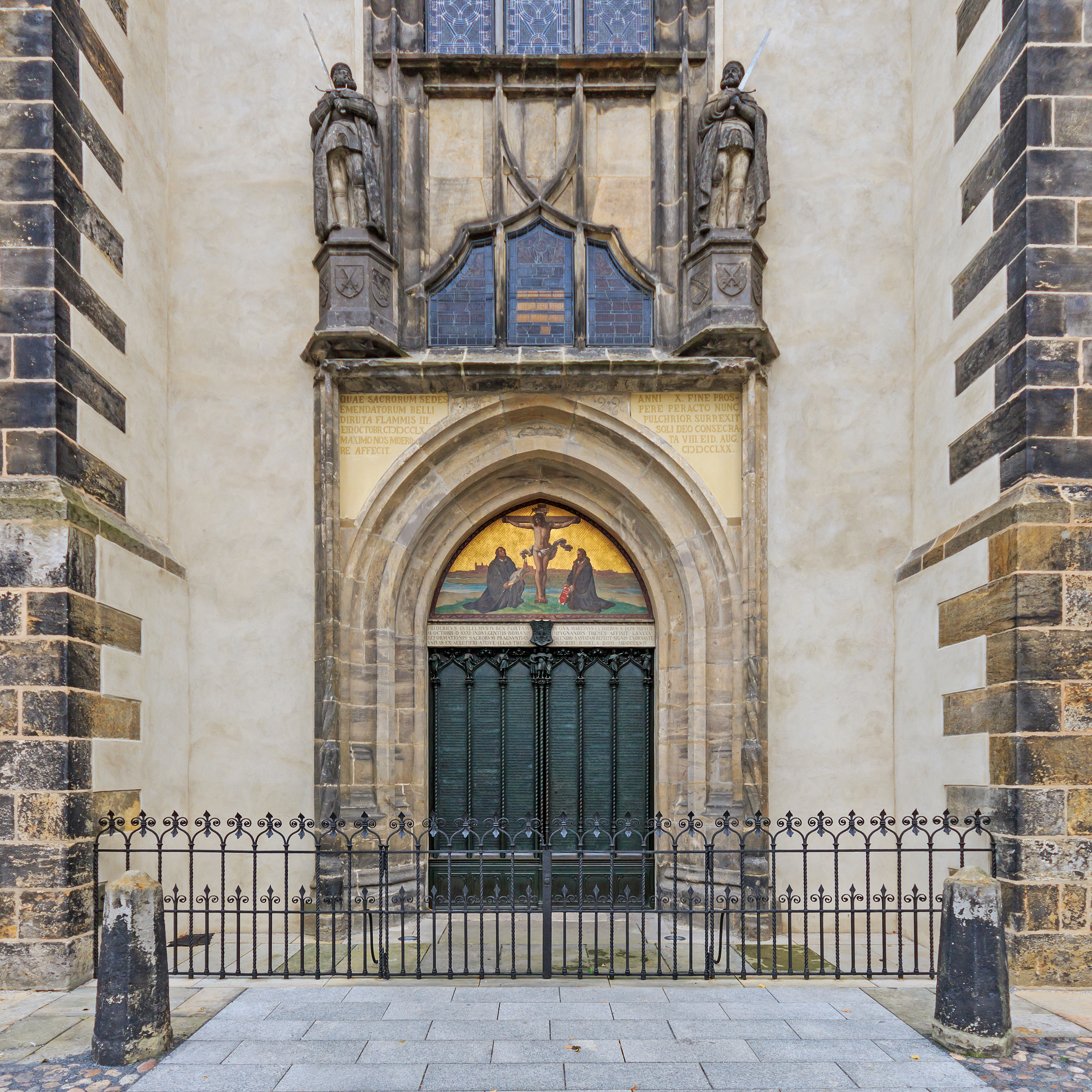
"Thesentür" (door of the theses) memorial at Schlosskirche in Lutherstadt Wittenberg

The Wittenburg Door, sometimes known as simply The Door, was a Christian satire and humor magazine, previously published bimonthly by the non-profit Trinity Foundation based in Dallas, Texas. The magazine started publication in 1971 and ceased publication in 2008. It was then published only online by John Bloom until its recent transition to a new group of "door keepers". The title was a reference to the Ninety-Five Theses written by Martin Luther in 1517 that he is believed to have posted on the door of the All Saints' Church, Wittenberg. A documentary, Nailin' it to the Church, by Murray Stiller was made in 2009.

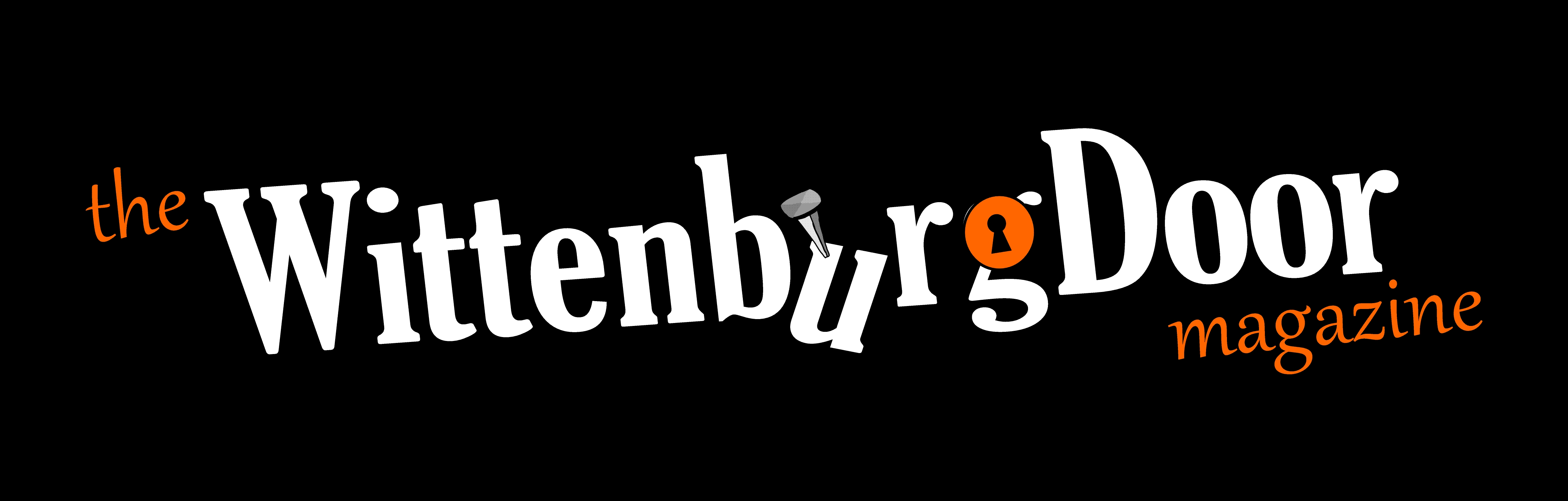
