= Trinity Foundation (Dallas) =

American religious ministry and watchdog group

The Trinity Foundation is an American watchdog ministry founded by Ole Anthony in 1972. Its main mission is to expose abuse of public trust by televangelism and religious organisations. It has provided information to news outlets as well as state and federal agencies. As of 2020, the president of the organisation is Peter Evans.

It launched the Dallas Project in the 1980s as a challenge to religious organizations to help the homeless in the United States, which was in 2010 taken over by Community on Columbia (The Block), a church attended by many members of Trinity Foundation.

== History ==
The Trinity Foundation was founded by Ole Anthony in June 1972. (Note: Assume typo in the D Magazine article; website says 1972.) and based in Dallas, Texas.

The organization started with the purpose of conducting demographic research on televangelism and other religious television programming. During a series of scandals in the 1980s and 1990s, the Trinity Foundation established itself as a watchdog group that provided information about fraud and abuse by religious groups.

It has provided the results of its research and collaborated with journalists at ABC News, CBS News, NBC News, CNN, and Last Week Tonight with John Oliver.

Anthony died in 2021.

== Televangelists ==
Trinity Foundation's investigative work into the fundraising tactics of big-money televangelists first came to national attention in 1991 following a Primetime Live hidden-camera look at televangelist Robert Tilton. The foundation was instrumental in providing evidence for the many state and federal investigations of Tilton in the years that followed.

Other televangelists investigated by Trinity include Benny Hinn, Jan and Paul Crouch Kenneth Copeland, Joyce Meyer, Paula White, Peter Popoff, W.V. Grant, and Edwin Barry Young. It has been a critic of the Trinity Broadcasting Network, and called for ministries of prominent televangelists Billy and Franklin Graham, Charles Stanley, Ron Luce, and others to withdraw from the network.

In 2005, Trinity filed a brief with the Internal Revenue Service as a challenge of Benny Hinn's church status for his Ministry on the basis that it failed to meet any of the 14 Point Criteria for how a church qualifies for its status with the IRS.

=== Senate Finance Committee investigation ===
The foundation was directly involved in Sen. Charles Grassley's Senate Finance Committee investigation of abuses by a number of televangelist ministries. Beginning in 2005, after being asked to help by the committee’s general counsel, the foundation submitted over the next six years 38 separate reports on abuses by religious not-for-profit organizations, which were incorporated into the committee’s final report.

The foundation criticized Grassley for turning to the Evangelical Council for Financial Accountability (ECFA) for suggested solutions instead of acting on tough legislative proposals from his staff for policing abuses by religious organizations. It said that the ECFA's recommendations were too lax and were compromised by close ties to the very ministries they were proposing to oversee.

== Other investigations ==
Trinity has also investigated the St. Matthew's Churches/Church By Mail, Inc., a "seed-faith ministry" of James Eugene "Gene" Ewing, which targets the poorest zip codes in America with religious mailings.

An investigative report on the Australian ABC TV's 19:30 programme on 6 April 2022 revealed that Hillsong, the global megachurch headquartered in Sydney, had acquired a lot of property that had been hidden behind a web of entities across the world. It had done this in part by assuming financial control over other churches, starting with Garden City Church in Brisbane in 2009. The Trinity investigator, Barry Bowen, found that Hillsong owned at least three condominiums in New York City, a US$3.5-million home in California and 31 properties in Arizona, expected to be worth a total of US$40 million by 2023. Its corporate and financial structures mean that the church is protected against litigation which demands large payouts to plaintiffs.

== Other activities ==
The foundation published The Wittenburg Door, a magazine of Christian satire that was established in 1971, from 1995 to 2008.

It launched the Dallas Project in the 1980s as a challenge to religious organizations to help the homeless in the United States, which was in 2010 taken over by Community on Columbia (The Block), a church attended by many members of Trinity Foundation. This is an independent church congregation separate from the foundation's oversight, but still in friendly cooperation and agreement with its mission.

== Controversy ==
Some former members of the group have been critical of the foundation and Anthony, accusing it of abuse and cultism, namely in the practices done by him as leader, which included "hot seat" sessions that led to verbal attacks led by Anthony under the guise of "cleansing"; in a 2006 article, several members blamed Trinity for the end of their marriages. Wendy Duncan, a former member of Trinity alongside her husband Doug (also a member and right-hand man to Anthony) wrote a book about her experiences there with the "cult" in I Can't Hear God Anymore that detailed Anthony's grip on decision-making that included the organization's purchase of thirteen apartment complexes in Oklahoma City in 1998; they defaulted $42 million in tax-exempt revenue bonds two years later. Anthony often claimed to live on less than $100 a week (even saying as such to journalists), which conflicted with a deposition he made in 1992 under oath that he had an account at Merrill Lynch with $26,000.
