= St. Matthew's Churches =

Evangelical Christian ministry

- Founder: James Eugene "Gene" Ewing
- Founded at: Kaufman, Texas
- Type: Evangelical Christian ministry
- Headquarters: Tulsa, Oklahoma
- Website: saintmatthewschurches.com

St. Matthew's Churches, formerly St. Matthew Publishing, Inc., is an evangelical Christian ministry. It is primarily a mail-based ministry with an address in Tulsa, Oklahoma, with churches in New York City and Houston. In 1999, St. Matthew Publishing Inc. reported $26.8 million in revenue. In 2007, it reportedly earned $6 million a month.

== Origins ==
The ministry is led by its founder James Eugene "Gene" Ewing, a former tent minister, who, according to the Trinity Foundation, lives in Beverly Hills, California. Ewing, a native of Kaufman, Texas, was born in 1933 and has written fundraising letters for other evangelists, including Oral Roberts as well as Don Stewart, W. V. Grant, and Rex Humbard.

Ewing operates Church by Mail Inc., which had a several-decade-long struggle with the IRS before being denied tax-exemption in 1992, which was appealed. Ewing was a revivalist in the 1960s with revenue at $2 million. He then began writing fundraising letters for Oral Roberts. By 1971, Ewing renamed the organization Church of Compassion as a "mail-order church with half a million 'members'" with income exceeding $3 million. In 1979, he started a for-profit advertising and printing business "to provide printing and mailing services to nonprofit religious groups." Then, in 1980, his business, Church by Mail, applied for tax-exemption. However, by the 1990s, his businesses owed back taxes to state and federal agencies. Nonetheless, in 1993, he bought a $2.2 million, 6,400-square-foot (590 m^{2}) home above Beverly Hills. Subsequently, a year later, the U.S. Tax Court ruled Church by Mail Inc. is "operated for private rather than public interests" and "is not a church" within the meaning of federal tax laws.

== Operations and fundraising ==
The ministry has been accused of preying on low-income and elderly people by using census records to target their mailings.

Although for several years the ministry operated without a church building and conducted its direct mail donation operation through the Tulsa address, a physical location to hold services—a then-78-year-old Baptist church in a predominantly Hispanic neighborhood—was purchased in Houston in 2004. St. Matthew's Churches' lawyer says weekly services draw about 1,000 people. According to the Trinity Foundation, an evangelical watchdog group, the physical churches are only associated with the mail-based ministry as a cover that allows the lucrative operation to retain tax-exempt church status. The status was granted by the Internal Revenue Service in 2000 after a 17-year court battle.

One of the organization's mailings consists of a paper "prayer rug", on which recipients were encouraged to kneel and pray. This mailing, along with others, has been mentioned by the Attorney General of the State of Arkansas, among others, as not providing information about their financial and fundraising practices. While the ministry does hold tax exemption status under section 501(c)(3) of the Internal Revenue Code, it has been the subject of numerous complaints to the Better Business Bureau, whose evaluation conclusion was that the organization did not meet two standards for Charity Accountability.
