= David Epley =

American Baptist clergyman (1931–2009)

David Epley (March 2, 1931 – June 28, 2009) was an American minister who broadcast his weekly Christian television show across the United States in the 1970s and 1980s, after initially gaining recognition through his regular daily broadcasts on more than fifty radio stations. Rev. Epley pastored a church in South Florida for almost forty years. Ordained as a General Baptist minister, he pastored small churches in Western Kentucky. He was called from Kentucky to be the guest minister for Dr. Thomas Wyatt at the Wings of Healing Temple in Portland, Oregon during a month-long Holy Land tour by Dr. and Mrs. Wyatt. With a nationally syndicated Sunday program originating directly from Wings of Healing, David Epley began receiving invitations to hold revivals from California to Texas to Washington, D.C.

With this exposure, Rev. Epley continued to travel the country, with his family, holding revivals in large churches and auditoriums. He later became a Charismatic preacher with a healing ministry reaching crowds of thousands. He pastored large congregations in St. Louis, Miami and Hallandale, Florida.

Serving both as pastor and evangelist his identifying trademark was what many considered his uncanny ability to "know the thoughts and condition of others." Among Evangelical and Pentecostal circles these gifts are referred to as the "gift of knowledge" and the "gift of discernment." In this gift some compared his ministry to the type of ministry which William M. Branham had. Epley wrote many books, but was best known for his book "The Gift of Discernment."

David Epley Ministries sent out a monthly magazine called "The Good Shepherd Magazine." The magazine frequently offered what pastor Epley referred to as "points of contact" such as prayer cloths, vials of Holy Anointing Oil, etc. Pastor Epley also well known for his letters of inspiration which he sent frequently to those on his personal mailing list.

Epley was also known for his gospel records, and some of his LPs from the 1960s and 1970s later surfaced online. They are also still featured on some radio stations across the country. His preaching style has been adopted by contemporary ministers.

Epley died from heart failure on June 28, 2009, at the age of 78.
