= List of television evangelists =

This is a list of notable television evangelists. While a global list, most are from the United States.

== Australia ==
- Christine Caine (born 1966)
- Russell Evans (born 1967)
- Bobbie Houston (born 1957)
- Brian Houston (born 1954)

== Bahamas ==
- Myles Munroe (1954–2014)

== Brazil ==
- Sônia Hernandes, Igreja Renascer em Cristo
- Edir Macedo, Universal Church of the Kingdom of God
- Silas Malafaia, Assemblies of God
- Valnice Milhomens, National Church of Lord Jesus Christ
- Valdemiro Santiago, World Church of the Power of God
- Nivea Soares, Lagoinha Baptist Church
- R. R. Soares, International Church of God's Grace
- Ana Paula Valadão, Lagoinha Baptist Church and Before the Throne Church - by Lagoinha
- André Valadão, Lagoinha Baptist Church
- Márcio Valadão, Lagoinha Baptist Church
- Mariana Valadão, Lagoinha Baptist Church

== Canada ==
- Todd Bentley (born 1976)
- Henry Feyerabend (1931–2006)
- David Mainse (1936–2017)
- Charles Templeton (1915–2001)
- Terry Winter (1942–1998)
- Peter Youngren (born 1954)

== Germany ==
- Reinhard Bonnke (1940–2019)

== Ghana ==
- Elvis Agyemang (born 1988)
- Dag Heward-Mills (born 1963)
- Michael Kwabena Ntumy (1958–2023)
- Eric Nyamekye
- Opoku Onyinah (born 1954)

== India ==
- Zakir Naik (born 1965)

== Indonesia ==
- Gilbert Lumoindong (born 1966)

== Nigeria ==
- Enoch Adeboye (born 1942)
- Foluke Adeboye (born 1948)
- Paul Adefarasin (born 1963)
- Joseph Adebayo Adelakun (born 1949)
- Nkechi Anayo-Iloputaife
- Tunde Bakare (born 1954)
- Yemi Davids (born 1976)
- Jeremiah Omoto Fufeyin (born 1971)
- Benson Idahosa (1938–1998)
- Joshua Iginla (born 1969)
- Evelyn Joshua (born 1968)
- T.B. Joshua (1963–2021)
- William Kumuyi (born 1941)
- Timothy Oluwole Obadare (1930–2013)
- Taiwo Odubiyi (born 1965)
- Bimbo Odukoya (1960–2005)
- Chris Okafor (born 1970)
- Chris Okotie (born 1958)
- Deborah Omale (born 1981)
- Emmanuel Omale (born 1970)
- Tim Omotoso (born 1958)
- Ayo Oritsejafor
- Albert Odulele (born 1964)
- Chris Oyakhilome (born 1963)
- David Oyedepo (born 1954)
- Johnson Suleman (born 1971)

== Norway ==
- Jan Hanvold (born 1951)
- Johnn Hardang (born 1953)
- Ludvig Nessa (born 1949)
- Svein-Magne Pedersen (born 1948)
- Jørn Strand
- Egil Svartdahl (born 1954)
- Jan-Aage Torp (born 1957)

== Philippines ==
- Kata Inocencio (born 1960)
- Mari Kaimo (born 1960)
- Apollo Quiboloy (born 1950)
- Daniel S. Razón (born 1967)
- Coney Reyes (born 1954)
- Bo Sanchez (born 1966)
- Rosario Silayan-Bailon (1959–2006)
- Eli Soriano (1947–2021)
- Eduardo Manalo (born 1953)
- Mike Velarde (born 1939)
- Eddie Villanueva (born 1946)

== Singapore ==
- Kong Hee (born 1964)
- Joseph Prince (born 1963)

== South Africa ==
- Ray McCauley (1949–2024)

== United States ==
=== A ===
- A. A. Allen (1911–1970)
- Mother Angelica (1923–2016)
- Ernest Angley (1921–2021)
- John Ankerberg (born 1945)
- Garner Ted Armstrong (1930–2003)
- Herbert W. Armstrong (1892–1986)
- Kay Arthur (1933–2025)

=== B ===
- Jim Bakker (1940-2026)
- Tammy Faye Bakker (1942–2007)
- Doug Batchelor (born 1957)
- Batsell Barrett Baxter (1916–1982)
- George G. Bloomer (born 1963)
- Dave Breese (1926–2002)
- Juanita Bynum (born 1959)

=== C ===
- Harold Camping (1921–2013)
- Morris Cerullo (1931–2020)
- Twinkie Clark (born 1954)
- Bayless Conley (born 1955)
- Kenneth Copeland (born 1936)
- John Corapi (born 1947)
- Percy Crawford (1902–1960)
- W. A. Criswell (1909–2002)
- Jan Crouch (1938–2016)
- Paul Crouch (1934–2013)

=== D ===
- Billy Joe Daugherty (1952–2009)
- Creflo Dollar (born 1962)
- Richard Dortch (1931–2011)
- Jesse Duplantis (born 1949)

=== E ===
- Frederick J. Eikerenkoetter II (1935–2009), better known as Reverend Ike
- Tony Evans (born 1949)

=== F ===
- Jerry Falwell Sr. (1933–2007)
- Mark Finley (born 1945)
- Jentezen Franklin (born 1962)
- Robert J. Fox (1927–2009)
- Steven Furtick (born 1980)

=== G ===
- Anne Graham Lotz (born 1948)
- Billy Graham (1918–2018)
- Franklin Graham (born 1952)
- Jack Graham (born 1950)
- Robert Grant (born 1936)
- W.V. Grant (born 1945)

=== H ===
- John Hagee (born 1940)
- Kenneth E. Hagin (1917–2003)
- Billy James Hargis (1925–2004)
- Jack Hayford (1934–2023)
- Marilyn Hickey (1931–2026)
- Benny Hinn (born 1952)
- Rex Humbard (1919–2007)

=== J ===
- Orval Lee Jaggers (1916–2004)
- T.D. Jakes (born 1957)
- Leroy Jenkins (1934–2017)
- Robert Jeffress (born 1955)
- David Jeremiah (born 1941)
- James F. Jones (1907–1971)
- E. Bernard Jordan (born 1959)
- Noel Jones (born 1950)

=== K ===
- Bill Keller (born 1958)
- D. James Kennedy (1930–2007)
- Ben Kinchlow (1936–2019)
- Kathryn Kuhlman (1907–1976)

=== L ===
- Tim LaHaye (1926–2016)
- Bob Larson (born 1944)
- Joni Lamb (1960–2026)
- Marcus Lamb (1957–2021)
- Greg Laurie (born 1952)
- Larry Lea (born 1951)
- Hal Lindsey (1929–2024)
- Eddie L. Long (1953–2017)
- Max Lucado (born 1955)

=== M ===
- John MacArthur (1939-2025)
- James MacDonald (born 1960)
- Guillermo Maldonado (born 1965)
- Walter Ralston Martin (1928–1989)
- Clarence McClendon (born 1965)
- Joyce Meyer (born 1943)
- Beth Moore (born 1957)
- Robert Morris (born 1961)
- Mike Murdock (born 1946)
- Arnold Murray (1929–2014)

=== O ===
- T.L. Osborn (1923–2013)
- Joel Osteen (born 1963)
- John Osteen (1921–1999)
- Paul Osteen (born 1955)
- Victoria Osteen (born 1961)

=== P ===
- Luis Palau (1934–2021)
- Rod Parsley (born 1957)
- Earl Paulk (1927–2009)
- Carlton Pearson (1953–2023)
- Michael Pitts (born 1964)
- Peter Popoff (born 1946)
- Frederick K. C. Price (1932–2021)
- Derek Prince (1915–2003)

=== R ===
- Oral Roberts (1918–2009) – First television broadcast in 1954
- Richard Roberts (born 1948)
- Gordon P. Robertson (born 1958)
- Pat Robertson (1930–2023)
- James Robison (1943-2026)
- Samuel Rodriguez (born 1969)
- Adrian Rogers (1931–2005)
- Richard Rossi (born 1963)

=== S ===
- Jerry Savelle (1946–2024)
- R.W. Schambach (1926–2012)
- Kirt Schneider ("Discovering the Jewish Jesus")
- Bobby Schuller (born 1981)
- Robert A. Schuller (born 1954)
- Robert H. Schuller (1926–2015) – Started his ministry in 1955, best known for The Hour of Power
- Gene Scott (1929–2005)
- Fulton Sheen (1895–1979)
- Kerry Shook (born 1962)
- Ralph Sockman (1889–1970)
- Andy Stanley (born 1958)
- Charles Stanley (1932–2023)
- Don Stewart (1939–2024)
- Perry Stone (born 1959)
- Lester Sumrall (1913–1996)
- Jimmy Swaggart (1935–2025)
- Charles Swindoll (born 1934)

=== T ===
- Robert Tilton (born 1946)
- Casey Treat (born 1955)

=== V ===
- George Vandeman (1916–2000)
- Jack Van Impe (1931–2020)

=== W ===
- Rick Warren (born 1954)
- Paula White (born 1966)
- Jim Whittington (born 1941)
- Andrew Wommack (born 1949)
- Bill Winston (born 1943)
- Jack Wyrtzen (1913–1996)

=== Y ===
- Homer Edwin Young (born 1936)
- Ed Young (born 1961)
- Michael Youssef (born 1948)

== Zimbabwe ==
- Uebert Angel (born 1978)
