= Leroy Jenkins =

Leroy Jenkins may refer to:

- Leroy Jenkins (musician) (1932–2007), composer and free jazz violinist and violist
- Leroy Jenkins (televangelist) (1934–2017), American televangelist
- Leeroy Jenkins, a player character and Internet meme originating in the computer game World of Warcraft
