= R. W. Schambach =

American televangelist and faith healer (1926–2012)

- Born: April 3, 1926; Harrisburg, Pennsylvania, U.S.
- Died: January 17, 2012 (aged 85); Tyler, Texas, U.S.
- Education: Central Bible Institute, Springfield, Missouri, B.A. theology
- Occupations: Pentecostal Pastor and Evangelist
- Employer: Shambach Ministries
- Known for: Co-founder and president of Schambach Ministries, Tyler, Texas
- Title: Rev. Schambach
- Political party: Republican
- Spouse: Mary Winifred Donald Schambach (m. 1948–2010; her death)
- Children: 2 sons, 1 daughter
- Website: www.schambach.org

Robert William "R. W." Schambach (April 3, 1926 – January 17, 2012) was an American televangelist, pastor, faith healer and author.

== Early life and faith ==
Robert W. Schambach was born on April 3, 1926, in Harrisburg, Pennsylvania, to Harry Ellsworth and Ann Moyer Schambach. He became a born-again Christian as a youth, in response to the evangelist C. M. Ward.

== Ministry ==
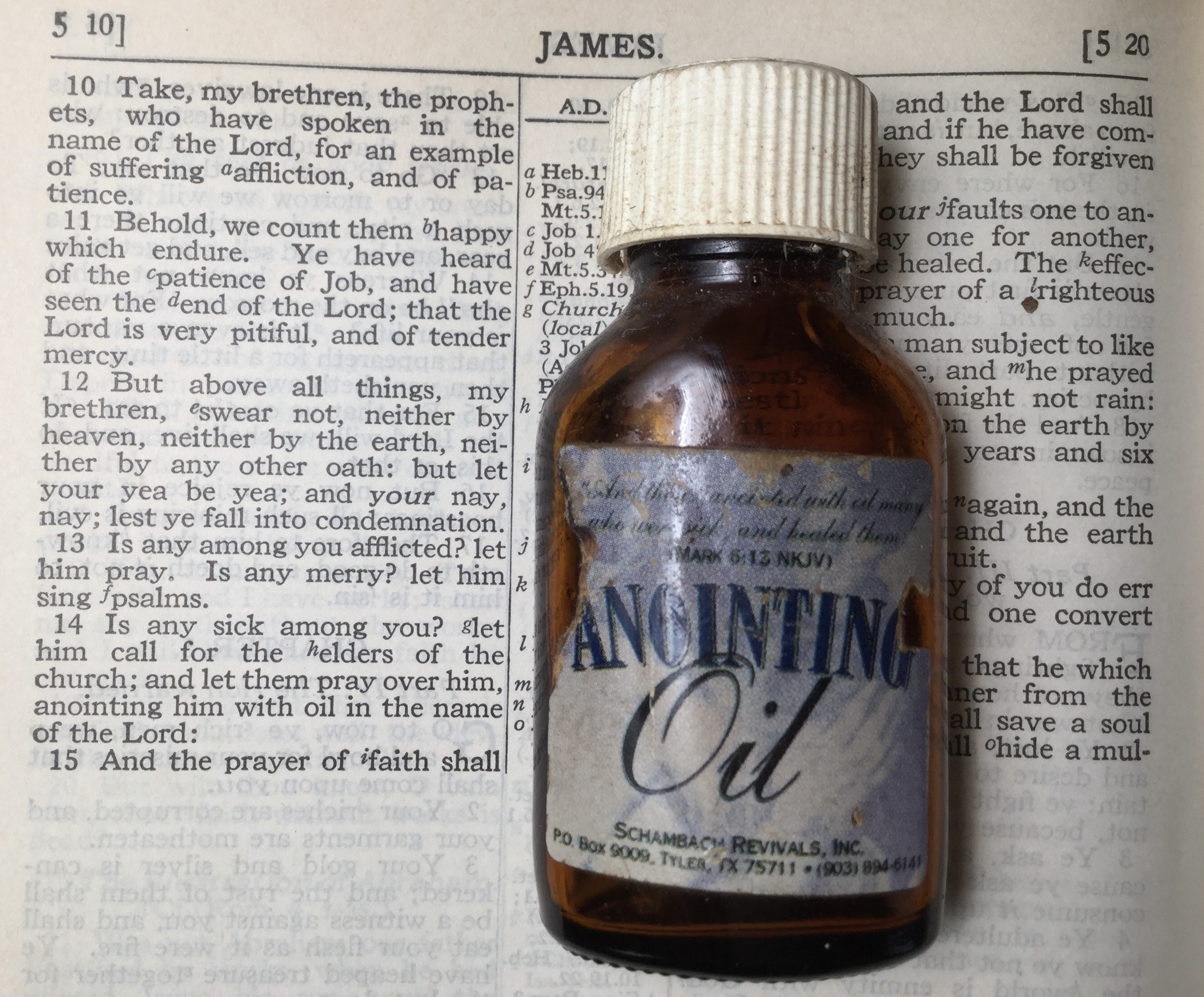
R. W. Schambach anointing oil

Ordained as a pastor by C. M. Ward, Schambach, who was also a protégé of the evangelist/faith healer T. L. Osborn, received his formal training at Central Bible Institute in Springfield, Missouri, in the mid-1940s, after serving in World War II as a navy boilermaker on a destroyer in the South Pacific and Asia. He then began an apprenticeship with A. A. Allen and worked for five years. Schambach began travelling extensively with Allen on his "Miracle Crusades" during that period along with Don Stewart and Leroy Jenkins.

His television program, Power Today, was seen on the Daystar Christian TV network.

== Personal life ==
Schambach's wife was Mary Winifred Donald (born September 3, 1926, in Philadelphia, Pennsylvania). R.W. met Mary while she was a student at the Eastern Bible Institute of the Assemblies of God in Green Lane, Pennsylvania (now the University of Valley Forge in Phoenixville, Pennsylvania). They married the following year, on September 4, 1948 (just one day after Mary's birthday). The couple subsequently had two sons and a daughter: Bobby, Bruce and Donna. Donna Schambach is a pastor and Word of Faith minister in the Tyler area. Schambach had six grandchildren: Rachel, Bobby III, Jessica, Amanda, Christi and Craig. They had been married for 61 years when Mary died from natural causes in Tyler, Texas on April 20, 2010, at age 83. Less than two years later he died of a heart attack on January 17, 2012, age 85. He was interred next to his wife at the Cathedral in the Pines Cemetery in Tyler, Texas.

== See also ==
- Faith healing
- Glossolalia
- Pentecostalism
- Word of Faith
- Holy Spirit
