= Miracle Valley, Arizona =

CDP in Cochise County, Arizona

- census-designated place
- Location of Miracle Valley in Cochise County, Arizona.

- Location in the United States
- Coordinates: 31°22′59″N 110°08′55″W
- Country: United States
- State: Arizona
- County: Cochise

Area
  - Total: 0.54 sq mi (1.41 km^{2})
  - Land: 0.54 sq mi (1.41 km^{2})
  - Water: 0 sq mi (0.00 km^{2})
- Elevation: 4,334 ft (1,321 m)

Population (2020)
  - Total: 571
  - Density: 1,048.3/sq mi (404.74/km^{2})
- Time zone: UTC-7 (MST (no daylight saving time))
- ZIP code: 85615
- Area code: 520
- FIPS code: 04-46840
- GNIS feature ID: 2582827

Miracle Valley is a census-designated place in the southern portion of Cochise County in the state of Arizona, United States. It lies approximately 17 miles to the southeast of the city of Sierra Vista, along Arizona State Highway 92. The population of Miracle Valley as of the 2010 U.S. Census was 644.

== Miracle Valley Bible College ==
The community of Miracle Valley was founded in rural Cochise County in 1959 by evangelist A. A. Allen, who established the Miracle Valley Bible College (MVBC) on 1240 acres along the south side of Highway 92. Since Allen's death in 1970 the property has been purchased and/or occupied by a variety of organizations: the Don Stewart Evangelistic Association, later the Don Stewart Association; the Southern Arizona Bible College, operated by the Hispanic Assemblies (until 1995); and the Miracle Valley Bible College and Seminary, operated by the Melvin Harter Ministries (from 1999). The property was foreclosed by Landmark Capital in 2009. Over time, various offers to purchase were made; however, all fell through. In 2014 the property was purchased by Youth Pad, who hoped to restore the property but ultimately failed. The property was auctioned off by the County and sold in October 2024.

== Miracle Valley shootout ==
In 1978–80 approximately 300 members of the Christ Miracle Healing Center and Church (CMHCC) moved from Mississippi and Chicago. They purchased property in the subdivision on the north side of Highway 92, across from the bible college. The founder of CMHCC, Frances E. Thomas, was a former disciple of Allen's at MVBC and attempted to purchase it after his death. Over the following two years, numerous conflicts arose between the church members and the local community and law enforcement.

Tensions escalated when it was discovered that five young children of church members had died over the previous year, with one and possibly as many as four due to the church's refusal to seek medical attention. Faith healing was a major component of the church's teachings. Conflicts also arose when the church refused access to parents and law enforcement in retrieving the children of at least two families who had been illegally transported to the Valley against their parents' wishes. Racial tensions arose between the African American church members and the mostly white residents.

In late 1982, a variety of incidents with law enforcement culminated when local sheriff deputies, with backup by state law enforcement, attempted to serve bench warrants for the arrest of three members of the church. A large group of church members confronted the officials and in the ensuing "shootout" two church members were killed and seven law enforcement officers were injured. One church member and one sheriff's deputy later died of their injuries. The church members departed Miracle Valley in early 1983.

== Demographics ==
Historical population
Census	Pop.	Note	%±
2010	644		—
2020	571		−11.3%
U.S. Decennial Census
