= Iginla =

Iginla is a surname. Notable people with the surname include:

- Jade Iginla (born 2004), Canadian ice hockey player
- Jarome Iginla (born 1977), Canadian ice hockey player
- Joshua Iginla (born 1969), Nigerian pastor
- Tij Iginla (born 2006), Canadian ice hockey player
