= Gene Martin (gospel singer) =

Gene Martin (1939 – March 20, 2015) was a singer, choir director and evangelist, who led services for the Pentecostal evangelist A. A. Allen throughout the 1960s.

Martin was born in 1939 in Atlanta, where he had a modest following as gospel singer before joining Allen's crusade team in 1961. He served with Allen until his death in 1970 and remained with Allen's successor, Don Stewart, before starting his own ministry, the Gene Martin Action Revival.

Martin was credited with being early to bring a "black beat" to services, something that would become more widespread in the 1970s. The power of the music contributed to the success of Allen's ministry at a time when other healing evangelists were closing up their tents. In a posthumous letter that appeared in the magazine for Allen's ministry, he wrote: "It doesn't matter if Don Stewart plants, or Brother Rogers waters, or Gene Martin tills, or if I reap. IT IS GOD THAT GIVES THE INCREASE."

In 2001, Martin was included in Bishop Carlton Pearson's Live at Azusa, Vol. 4, performing "Too Close to Heaven/I've Got It."

In 2025, Martin's recording of "Touch the Hem of His Garment" was the first selection by the British actor Lennie James during his appearance on the BBC Radio show Desert Island Discs.
