= Jørn Strand =

Norwegian televangelist

Jørn Strand is a Norwegian televangelist and tent revival evangelist. He is associated with Pentecostalism and the charismatic movement.

== Evangelism ==
Strand grew up in a non-religious home. He was previously a drug addict for ten years until he had a radical conversion to Christianity in 1991 which included speaking in tongues and being filled with the Holy Spirit. He soon began travelling around to evangelise, and founded the organisation Evangeliet For Alle in 1993.

He evangelises with street meetings and hosts tent meetings with up to two thousand attendants. He emphasises being filled with the Holy Spirit in contrast to simply being born-again and interprets people speaking in tongues at his meetings.

Strand formerly evangelised on the Christian television station Visjon Norge. Since 2020, he has been broadcast on the Christian television station Kanal 10.

In 2019, he started a Bible school in Froland Municipality.
