= Terry Winter (televangelist) =

Former Televangelist 1942-1998

Terry Winter (November 1, 1942 – December 10, 1998) was a Canadian televangelist, who hosted The Terry Winter Show on Vision TV.

Unlike some other Christian televangelists, Winter took an intellectual approach to faith. He taught that Christianity is a simple faith, not a simplistic one, and that if one decides to become a Christian, one does not need to leave one's mind at the door.

Born in New Westminster, British Columbia, Winter was raised in Nanaimo, British Columbia. Winter died of a brain aneurysm in Vancouver, British Columbia at age 56 in 1998. His television program continued to air in repeats for a few months, ending permanently in early 1999.

The most unique feature in his shows, was that every show he offered "Books that we can send to you and every week we try to send the best Christian literature available to anyone who'll take the time and write to us" While he did welcome sponsors for the show, the emphasis was on giving something to the viewers.
