= McDonaldisation, Masala McGospel and Om Economics =

2010 book by Jonathan D. James

- Author: Jonathan D. James
- Language: English
- Genre: Non-fiction
- Publication date: 2010
- Publication place: Australia

McDonaldisation, Masala McGospel and Om Economics is a book on the phenomenon of Christian televangelism in early 21st century urban India. The book was written in 2010 by Jonathan D. James of Edith Cowan University in Australia.

== Overview ==
The book discusses religion in a transnational, global context and is based on a three years ethnographic study of Church and Hindu community leaders from India.

It compares televised religion to "McDonaldisation", which is the process by which society takes on the characteristics of the famous US fast-food restaurant, McDonald's. James argues that global Christian television programs that are broadcast on Indian television without any editing are similar to the process of McDonaldisation which takes a 'one size fits all', standardized approach.

The book also discusses the fusion between Indian and American televangelism, which he refers to as "Masala McGospel". James does this by attempting a case study of a program produced by the Christian Broadcasting Network (CBN) India, entitled Solutions. Whilst the author's initial intention was to analyze Christian televangelism, James also discovered the prevalence of Hindu televangelism in India, which he refers to as ‘Om Economics’ because of the predominantly commercial nature of this phenomenon.

James' study reveals that Christian televangelism in India (which comes in three varieties: global, local and 'glocal' [the fusion of Indian and US], is mainly produced by the Charismatic and neo-Pentecostal brands of Christianity rather than the 'mainline', established denominational churches (such as Anglican or Presbyterian.

== Globalization ==
McDonaldisation, Masala McGospel and Om Economics is unique in that it places televangelism and religion in the context of globalization. Media scholar Sukhmani Khorana reflects in her analysis, that the author is "cognizant of macro cultural dynamics" in borrowing terminology such as ‘border crossing’ and ‘border blurring’ that show the interplay of religion, nation and media.

The author infers that Hindu televangelism has been helped by Christian televangelism in the sense that the rhetoric, techniques and style have been borrowed from Christian TV (mainly of the American, Charismatic variety) and taken on board in promoting Hindu practices on Indian television. This leads to the idea that there are historical precedents as to how colonial Christianity has influenced Hinduism in various ways.

Pradip Thomas singles out the sociologically grounded methodology of the study as one of the strengths of the book as the interviews with religious leaders "offer insights into their apprehensions, interpretations and understandings of televangelism". Missiologist Roger Hedlund, in his assessment sees the major contribution of the study as the emphasis on the indigenization of Indian Christianity rather than the Americanization of the faith.

== Critical responses ==
Savio Abreu and Rudolph Heredia point out that the limited content analysis of TV programs and sampling of interviews prohibit this from being seen as an exhaustive and comprehensive study. Rajalakshimi Kannan questions the author's choice of the cities - Mumbai and Hyderabad where he conducted his interviews, pointing out that Mumbai is the headquarters for Hindu extremist groups and Hyderabad is a city with a large Muslim population and that if the studies were conducted in other cities, they may have revealed "significantly different" responses. Robert Stephens is of the opinion that the author's motivation for the study is not merely historical or ethnographic, but rather in "rescuing the state of missionary work in South Asia". Thomas cautions the reader from coming to the quick conclusion that television is the dominant means of evangelism in India today as televangelism's "ubiquity is not matched by its influence". In a similar vein, Ahmad writing from a political science perspective, calls for more analysis as the study does not actually explore "the vested political and/or economic interests" of mediatized faith in India.

== Overall usefulness ==
Most scholars argue in the balance, that McDonaldisation, Masala McGospel and Om Economics is original and useful reading "for students of religion and culture in pluralist societies" as well as "media personnel and academicians involved in religious media studies, sociology of media and sociology of religion". Kannan indicates that the study is filled with "numerous directions in relation to further research on a topic to which little attention has generally been paid in the past". Indian historian, Vincent Kumaradoss draws attention to James' unique and somewhat provocative assertions in the book such as the 'full circle accommodation' assertion, which explores the "inspirational linkages" of the two faiths - the idea that just as Hinduism earlier influenced aspects of Charismatic Christian practices, Charismatic theology is now returning to India, through the airwaves with increased intensity and even toxicity. Khorana concludes her review with the following assessment: "[The Study] contributes significantly to cross-cultural religious studies and it can also serve as a useful model for examining the televisual presence of other non-Hindu faiths in India, and for considering how they interact with both the local Hindu mainstream and their global and diasporic arms".

== The author ==
James is an adjunct lecturer in media, culture, politics, and religion.

James followed this book with Transnational Religious Movements: Faith's Flows which was published in 2017. The book looks at how world religions have become involved with politics, economics and welfare.

James also edited and wrote the introductory chapter and conclusion to The Internet and the Google Age which was published in 2014.

== See also ==
- Televangelism
- McDonaldization
- The McDonaldization of Society
- Charismatic movement
- Globalization
