= S. Parkes Cadman =

American Protestant clergyman (1864–1936)

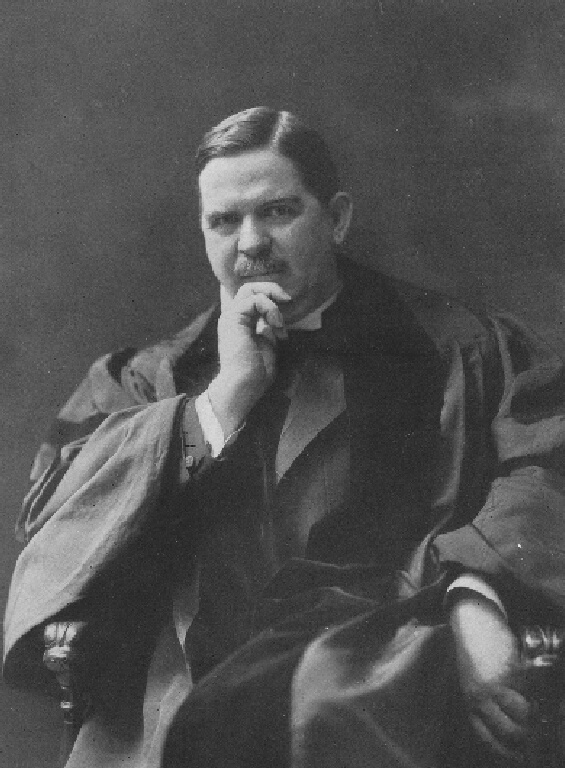
- S. Parkes Cadman at age 46 in 1910
- Born: December 18, 1864; Ketley, Shropshire, England
- Died: July 12, 1936 (aged 71); Plattsburgh, New York, US
- Education: Richmond College, University of London; Wesleyan Methodist College
- Children: Frederick, Lillian, Marie
- Parent(s): Samuel Cadman and Betsy (Parkes) Cadman
- Religion: Protestant Christian
- Church: Congregational Christian Churches
- Congregations served: Metropolitan Methodist Church, New York City, (1895-1901); Central Congregational Church, Brooklyn, New York (1901-1936)
- Offices held: New York radio pastor (1923-1928); Speaker, NBC radio network (1928-1936); President, Federal Council of the Churches of Christ in America (1924-1928)

Samuel Parkes Cadman (December 18, 1864 – July 12, 1936) was an English-born American liberal Protestant clergyman, newspaper writer, and pioneer Christian radio broadcaster of the 1920s and 1930s. He was an early advocate of ecumenism and an outspoken opponent of anti-Semitism and racial intolerance. By the time of his death in 1936, he was called "the foremost minister of Congregational faith" by the New York Times.

== Early life ==
Cadman was born in Ketley, Shropshire, England, where he worked in a coal mine for ten years beginning at age 11. He was a voracious reader and even read books while working in the mine, in between hauling loads of coal. He became interested in theology and began speaking at age 18 as a lay preacher in local Methodist churches. He studied at Richmond College of the University of London and at the Wesleyan Methodist College seminary. While a seminarian in 1888, he heard Catherine Booth of The Salvation Army speak in London. "I have not heard since anything which moved me more deeply than that remarkable address," he said years later, "delivered in the purest English, with faultless diction, in a voice like the pealing of a silver bell across a still lake."

== Ministry ==
=== New York churches ===
After graduating from seminary, Cadman moved to the United States to pastor a local Methodist church in Millbrook, New York. In 1895, he started the Metropolitan Methodist Church (now The United Methodist Church of the Village) on Seventh Avenue between Thirteenth and Fourteenth Streets in New York City, where his preaching attracted large crowds. In 1901, he left the Metropolitan Methodist Church to lead the Central Congregational Church of Brooklyn, where he ministered for 35 years until his death in 1936. The church became one of the largest U.S. Congregationalist assemblies during his pastorate.

=== Radio broadcasting ===
In 1923, Cadman pioneered the use of the new medium of radio to broadcast his sermons, becoming "the first of the 'radio pastors', his sermons reach the ears of millions", said the New York Times. In 1928, he began a weekly Sunday afternoon radio broadcast on the NBC radio network, his powerful oratory reaching a nationwide audience of five million. He was also a frequent speaker from 1928 to 1936 on NBC's Sunday morning program The National Radio Pulpit, sharing the microphone with Ralph Washington Sockman.

== His writings ==
=== Newspaper column ===
Cadman began writing a daily newspaper column for the New York Herald Tribune in 1926. It was soon syndicated nationwide as Dr. Cadman's Daily Column, giving advice, answering readers' questions, and providing commentary on current events from a Christian perspective.

On December 2, 1934, he wrote an article condemning the Nazi German government for the firing of theologian Karl Barth from a German university post as a result of the professor's outspoken opposition to the Nazi regime and adamant refusal to sign an oath of allegiance to Adolf Hitler. Cadman praised Barth's courage, comparing him to Christian leaders of the past such as John Calvin and John Knox. Cadman later called for the U.S. to boycott the 1936 Summer Olympics in Berlin, Germany, because of the Nazis' anti-Semitic policies.

=== Books ===
Among the many books authored by Cadman are:

- The Victory of Christmas (1909)
- Charles Darwin and other English thinkers (1911)
- The War and its issues (1914)
- Kaiser or Christ? (1916)
- The Three Religious Leaders of Oxford and their Movements — John Wycliffe, John Wesley, and John Henry Newman (1916), reprinted by Kessinger in 2007 (ISBN 0548116563)
- Ambassadors of God (1920)
- Christianity and the State (1924)
- Imagination and religion (1926)
- The plain man's use of the Bible (1927)
- The Christ of God (1929)
- Peace (1929)
- Everyday Questions and Answers (1930)
- The Parables of Jesus (1931), reprinted by Random House in 1999 (ISBN 0517205467)
- Prophets of Israel (1933)

=== Quotations ===
During the course of his church ministry and extensive writings spanning a forty-year period, Cadman became widely quoted. Among his better-known statements are:

- "A little experience often upsets a lot of theory."
- "Nobody dreams of music in hell, and nobody conceives of heaven without it."
- "Beyond domestic animals and our response to their fealty and affection, we have a peculiar charge concerning the wild animals which supply our clothes, food and adornments."
- "Personally, I would not give a fig for any man's religion whose horse, cat and dog do not feel its benefits. Life in any form is our perpetual responsibility."
- "There can be no great people without a great religion and all your talk about character is so much playing down the wind, unless the regenerating and creative forces make a man obedient and the highest law reigns in his heart."

He also was a strong supporter of Scouting, writing:

It may be that the historian of the future, who will see the present as we can not see it, because we are too near to its events, will chronicle the origin of the Boy Scout movement as far more important for the development of humanity than the Battle of the Marne. I believe the Boy Scout Movement is in the deepest, most far-reaching sense truly religious; for while religion has manifold forms, it has only one eternal voice, whether that comes from Rome, Geneva or Canterbury, and it is the voice of everlasting justice, love and sacrificial service.

== National church and community leader ==
Rev. Cadman was one of the founders of the Federal Council of the Churches of Christ in America, an association of several Protestant denominations and the forerunner of today's National Council of Churches, and served as president of the council between 1924 and 1928. He was also named the second Honorary Moderator of the Congregational Christian Churches, succeeding former U.S. President Calvin Coolidge. He was one of the co-founders in 1927 of the National Conference on Christians and Jews, now known as the National Conference for Community and Justice (NCCJ), along with Charles Evans Hughes and others, to oppose the Ku Klux Klan, anti-Catholicism, and anti-Semitism in the 1920s and 1930s. He was appointed chairman of the National Committee for Chinese Famine Relief in 1928 to provide assistance for nine million Chinese facing starvation.

== Death ==
On Sunday, July 5, 1936, S. Parkes Cadman was preaching at an interfaith service in upstate Westport, New York, when he suddenly collapsed from acute appendicitis. He died a week later, on July 12, at a Plattsburgh, New York, hospital of peritonitis. After his death, he was lauded by NBC president Lenox R. Lohr, who said, "As the first minister of the air, he was identified with radio beginning in 1923. Since that time more than 500 sermons reflecting the inspiring thought of Dr. Cadman have been broadcast." New York City's Episcopal Bishop William T. Manning said Cadman had "a noble record of service as a citizen and as a Christian minister." Rev. Cadman was buried in Brooklyn, New York, where he is memorialized in Cadman Plaza, named in his honor by New York City in 1939. The Central Congregational Church in Brooklyn was renamed Cadman Memorial Church in 1942 in his memory.

In a high irony, however, Cadman Church was a prime player in opposition to an ecumenical movement that witnessed the Congregational Christian Churches merge with the Evangelical and Reformed Church to form the United Church of Christ. In 1949, the church sued the Congregational Christian moderator in order to forestall merger talks; the case stayed in the courts for several years before being dismissed and the merger taking place in 1957. Today, Cadman Church is a member of the National Association of Congregational Christian Churches, a group of congregations that opposed the UCC merger.
