= Donald Lee Stewart =

American televangelist (1939–2024)

Don Stewart
- Born: Donald Lee Stewart; October 25, 1939; Prescott, Arizona, U.S.
- Died: January 24, 2024 (aged 84); Arizona, U.S.
- Other name: Apostle Stewart
- Title: Head of Don Stewart Ministries/Don Stewart Association
- Predecessor: A. A. Allen
- Spouse: Brenda Stewart
- Children: 4

Donald Lee Stewart (October 25, 1939 – January 24, 2024) was an American Pentecostal minister and purported faith healer. He was a televangelist who hosted Power and Mercy on Black Entertainment Television, The Word Network, and other television channels. He was the successor to the late A. A. Allen's organization.

== Origins and early ministry ==
According to his official biography, Stewart was born on October 25, 1939, the youngest of six children. By the age of 13, Stewart had developed a severe bone disease. After four major surgeries when he was 15 years old, Stewart recovered. As of 2009, he lives in a $2.5 million home in Paradise Valley, Arizona, owned by his church, and Stewart's family receives income from his church. The Arizona Republic reports that "his ministry, the Don Stewart Association, operates out of a nondescript warehouse in an industrial park near Interstate 17." Stewart's son, Brendon Stewart, conducts his own "Miracle Crusades".

Stewart first worked with Allen, starting with "pounding tent stakes at Allen's revivals to driving a truck to preaching". One of Allen's rising young evangelistic proteges during the early 1960s, along with the likes of R. W. Schambach and Leroy Jenkins, Stewart served as evangelist and secretary-treasurer of Allen's organization, and "was hit with allegations of embezzlement by Allen's brother-in-law, of pocketing offerings from the revivals" in the wake of Allen's death. When the controversial Allen died from alcohol poisoning as a result of an alcoholic binge in 1970, Stewart tried to clean up Allen's room before the police came. After Allen's death, Stewart gained complete possession of Allen's organization, including his Miracle Valley property, and renamed Allen's Miracle Life Fellowship International the Don Stewart Evangelistic Association (and later the Don Stewart Association). Initially, Stewart retained Gene Martin as the musical director, before Martin left to start his own ministry.

From 1979 until early 1983, the Christ Miracle Healing Church and Center acquired land near Miracle Valley, leading to several confrontations with local authorities. The church, which had a strict and insular doctrine, and its 300 members had several confrontations with utility workers, neighbors, and eventually law enforcement, resulting in what became known as the Miracle Valley shootout. This confrontation resulted in the shooting deaths of two of its senior members and injuries to multiple sheriff's deputies. Immigrants from Chicago and Mississippi rioted, which resulted in the death of Therial Davis, a six-year-old. The land was abandoned within a couple of weeks. Stewart's organization had no connection to the Christ Miracle Healing Church and Center.

In 1982, Miracle Valley's main administration building and vast warehouse were set on fire by arson, which resulted in the total destruction of the facilities. The main building was valued at $2 million. Stewart sent multiple donation requests to some people on his 100,000-person mailing list "even though his ministry is not associated with the college and the fire damage was insured." According to the press, one of his letters "gave the impression ... the fire had crippled Stewart's ministry" and another purported to include the building's ashes with a request for $200 donations. Stewart faced allegations of arson from some sources. His own church had issues over Stewart's financing and "questioned Stewart's fundraising techniques" before.

== Later work and controversy ==
The Don Stewart Association controls "Feed My People", the "Southwest Indian Children's Fund", and "Miracle Life Fellowship International" (with offices in the Philippines). Additionally, Stewart also started the Northern Arizona Food Bank, which is operated by his association and directed by Kerry Ketcum. The expenditures of Stewart's organizations in the early 1990s and more recently have been subject to criticism for a lack of transparency. In 1992, USA Today cited Feed My People/Don Stewart Association among a group of organizations that "did not reply to BBB disclosure requests." In 1993, The Washington Post reported, "Feed My People International, an arm of the Don Stewart Association (a church)", sends "Prospective donors get heart-rending letters on behalf of starving children, with virtually no facts about where and how the money is distributed. Three watchdog groups have asked for details and been turned down." In 2008, the Better Business Bureau (BBB) reported that the Don Stewart Association "did not provide requested information. As a result, the Better Business Bureau cannot determine if it meets standards."

Then, in 1997, The Business Journal reported that the Internal Revenue Service was investigating Stewart's organization for mail fraud concerning high salaries and an $8 million annual income. After an investigation, the IRS "revoked the tax exemption of the Phoenix-based Don Stewart Association." Among the reasons for the IRS revoking the tax exemption were "impermissible benefits" to the Stewart family. As of 2008, according to the IRS, it is currently tax-exempted.

In 1998, the Washington Post reported that Don Stewart's "followings all but disappeared after investigations", but he has "joined dozens of other preachers to become fixtures on BET." Consequently, Stewart, along with Peter Popoff and Robert Tilton, received "criticism from those who say that preachers with a long trail of disillusioned followers have no place on a network that holds itself out as a model of entrepreneurship for the black community."

G. Richard Fisher, of The Quarterly Journal, has expressed concerns about Stewart's teachings on prosperity theology and healing miracles. The national U.S. television program Inside Edition with the Trinity Foundation investigated Stewart's wealth and fundraising practices. In 1996, The Dallas Morning News noted that some of Stewart's fundraising letters were written by Gene Ewing, who heads a multimillion-dollar marketing empire and writes donation letters for other evangelicals like WV Grant, Robert Tilton, Rex Humbard, and Oral Roberts. Included in some of Stewart's fundraising letters was Stewart's green "prayer cloth", with claims that it has supernatural healing power. Stewart's television programs and website currently offer the "Green Prosperity Prayer Handkerchief" which he claims people can use "to receive abundant blessings of financial prosperity". In a 2009 Skeptic article, Marc Carrier wrote about Stewart's handkerchief and his financial earnings, explaining the handkerchief is a "mere 17x17 cm" and came with a letter requesting a "seed faith" in the amount of "$500, $100, $50, or $30". Stewart's "seed faith" request included anonymous letters linking donations to new personal wealth, which was a way for Stewart to increase the donations his organization receives.

Stewart produced many DVDs and "healing packages" in addition to his three books. One of his later books from 2007, was titled Healing: The Brain-Soul Connection, and co-written with Daniel Amen. In the book, Stewart shares that he has ADD and is interested in helping those who experience mental and emotional difficulties. He also wrote Only Believe, a history of the early Latter Rain Movement that includes Oral Roberts, Kathryn Kuhlman, A. A. Allen, and Benny Hinn. The Don Stewart Association sells many books, DVDs, and "healing/miracle" packages. Stewart's faith healing services include live video streaming, live email testimonies and prayer requests, and cell phone prayer.

In May 2009, The Arizona Republic examined 22 charities tied to the Don Stewart Association, which claimed to be independent but with links via association employees, pastors and their wives, parents, children, and in-laws operated 16 of the 22 charities from tax years 2003 to 2005. The paper revealed Stewart's association spent the bulk of its money on salaries and expenses such as a Hummer H2 and $80,000 for a tract of farmland in Montana, purchased from the family of a hunger charity's president. Later that month, Arizona's attorney general's office began reviewing its practices to decide whether any action should be taken. Following the report in September 2009, The Arizona Republic reported St. Mary's Food Bank Alliance in Phoenix broke contact with Northern Arizona Food Bank and the Stewart Association was being investigated by the federal government. The Don Stewart Association would no longer comment to The Republic.

== Death ==
Stewart died in Paradise Valley, Arizona on January 24, 2024, at the age of 84.

== Books by Stewart ==
- Stewart, Don; Amen, Daniel (December 21, 2007). Healing: The Brain-Soul Connection (1st ed.). Don Stewart Association. ISBN 978-0-9800760-0-4.
- Stewart, Don (1999). Only Believe: An Eyewitness Account of the Great Healing Revivals of the 20th Century. Shippensburg, PA: Revival Press. ISBN 1-56043-340-X.
- Stewart, Don; Wagner, Walter (1971). The Man from Miracle Valley. Great Horizons Company. ISBN 0-910612-12-9.
