= Johnn Hardang =

Norwegian pastor-evangelist

Johnn Ravnkilde Hardang (born 25 December 1953) is a Norwegian pastor, and radio and television evangelist.

== Biography ==
Hardang formerly hosted a radio show that aired five days a week on the Christian radio station P7 Kristen Riksradio for nearly 20 years, and was carried on up to 60 local radio stations. Having evangelised for 45 years as of his retirement from radio in 2021, he has been described as a "legendary radio-pastor" by Christian newspaper Norge Idag, and in 2013 received the Honorary Prize from the Christian Radio Forum. He has also hosted a television series, written a number of books, and worked for the Christian magazine Bladet Evangelisten.

In 2022 he started a new Christian television station TV 12 Bedehuskanalen.
