= Jim Whittington =

American televangelist (born 1941)

Rev. Jim Whittington
- Born: Jim Whittington; February 16, 1941 (age 85); Dillon, South Carolina, U.S.
- Occupations: Televangelist; Author; Missionary
- Website: https://www.jimwhittington.com

Jim Whittington (born February 16, 1941) is an American televangelist ordained minister, preacher missionary and faith healer. Whittington has been in the ministry for 51 years.

In 1992, Whittington was convicted of federal crimes on 11 counts, including conspiracy, mail fraud and money laundering. He served 26 months in federal prison.

== Family ==
Whittington's father, Rev. A.B. Whittington, pastored and ministered in the Pentecostal denomination for more than 50 years. Rev. Jim Whittington's uncle, Rev. H.L. Whittington of Atlanta, Georgia, was also a minister who built more than thirty churches, and also lived to be 104 years old.

== Ministry ==
Whittington's ministry is aimed at Jamaica and the Caribbean area. His organization, World Deliverance International, donated three containers of chicken to the children and needy families in December 2011, resulting in 160,000 cans of chicken being distributed throughout the island. On June 12, 2012, another shipment of food was delivered to the island of Jamaica. Of the 270,000 meals in the shipment, 50,000 were designated for Maxfield Children's Home, in Kingston, Jamaica, the oldest and largest orphanage in the island. In the past, Whittington has been active in bringing in US$1,000,000 worth of textbooks. These textbooks were given to Penwood High School and two other schools in Kingston.

== Fraud conviction ==
On July 23, 1992, Whittington, along with four other evangelists, was convicted in federal court of defrauding Valeria Lust, a Lakeland, Florida widow who donated $913,072 in cash and property to his Fountain of Life ministry which he diverted for personal use. He was sentenced to ten years in prison for crimes including conspiracy, interstate transportation of stolen property, mail fraud and money laundering, was ordered to make restitution and served two years behind bars. Lust died in 1995. In 2005, Whittington was ordered by U.S. District Court Judge Malcolm Howard to make monthly payments to her estate after, according to federal prosecutors, years of dodging repayment; at the time, he still owed $848,532.
