= Miracle Valley shootout =

Confrontation between church members and law enforcement (1982)

The Miracle Valley shootout was a confrontation between members of the Christ Miracle Healing Center and Church (CMHCC) and Cochise County law enforcement that occurred in Miracle Valley, Arizona, United States, on October 23, 1982. A variety of incidents with law enforcement in 1982 culminated when a large group of church members confronted local sheriff's deputies and state law enforcement officers attempting to serve bench warrants for the arrest of three members of the church. In the ensuing melee, two church members were killed and seven people (five law enforcement officers and two church members) were injured. One church member and one law enforcement officer died later, both deaths possibly due to injuries sustained that day.

== Christ Miracle Healing Center and Church ==
The church was led by Pastor Frances Thomas, one of a reported 10,000 disciples of broadcasting evangelist A. A. Allen's original Miracle Valley Bible Church (MVBC). Her son, William Thomas Jr., was a bishop and the church's theoretical leader.

Thomas attempted to purchase the 2,560-acre property and its numerous buildings that were previously home to Allen's MVBC, with plans to re-establish the original church under her leadership. However, the owners at the time were prohibited from selling this property, situated on the south side of Arizona State Route 92 that bisects Miracle Valley. Therefore, Thomas instead purchased several properties for the church's use in the subdivision along the north side of the highway across from the MVBC, including a restaurant that was converted to a church sanctuary.

The church (whose congregation, clergy, and staff were entirely African American) was Pentecostal in teachings and outlook, but not affiliated with any established denomination. Specifically and controversially, Thomas stated she was a believer in faith healing only and not in doctors.

Her followers came to Miracle Valley in two distinct groups: the first (arriving between 1978 and 1979), composed of followers who lived in Mississippi, and the second (arriving in 1980), who had moved from Mississippi to Chicago.

The church was reported by sheriff's deputies to operate services almost continuously around the clock. Special assistants or watchers in the service were observed to ensure attendees did not fall asleep by striking people's heads with long poles. Children who were church members and attended local schools were observed by their teachers to be suffering from what appeared to be severe sleep-deprivation. Local residents and relatives of church members claimed she exerted a "cult-like dominance over her followers" and described church members as having "pledged their lives in cult-like devotion to Mother Thomas". The church denied this.

The local sheriff reported that Thomas referenced the Jim Jones massacre in Guyana, stating, "If you think Jonestown was a picnic, you ain't seen nothing yet" and "We already have the punch made."

== Background ==
In 1978, the first group of Healing Center and Church members from Mississippi began arriving in the community. During 1978 and into 1979, interactions between the existing, mostly white residents of this area of rural Cochise County and nearby community of Palominas and the entirely African-American church members from Mississippi were peaceful and friendly. However, once Pastor Thomas and the Chicago church members began to arrive starting in 1980, the previously peaceful relationships between the congregation and residents—both of whom were followers of A. A. Allen, who was an advocate of racial reconciliation—disintegrated into mutual distrust.

Following one or more minor burglaries of church-members' homes, in 1980 the church established an armed security force that patrolled church properties and local roads, and established roadblocks on the state highway. Bishop Thomas, who was in charge of these patrols, reportedly called them "Commandos for Christ" and "Soldiers for Jesus". Patrols communicated by CB radio and used code to describe people and situations.

In July 1981, sheriff's deputies attempting to arrest a church member were surrounded by a group of church members and forced to retreat. The county sheriff's department began integrated patrols with Department of Public Safety officers. The following month, a confrontation between deputies trying to make an arrest and armed church members prompted the sheriff's department to make a massive show of force. Sheriff Judd said it was intended to show "no one is above the law." By autumn, the situation was described by the sheriff as "a fight for control" with no end in sight; by the county supervisor "the best we can hope for is an uneasy truce"; by a sheriff's deputy as "we're outgunned and outmanned"; and by a local resident "it's going to end in death".

=== Racial tensions and lawsuit ===
Racial tensions between church members, and other local residents and law enforcement, were evident in Miracle Valley. Residents noted this developed, not when the early group of church members arrived in 1978–79 from Mississippi, but only after Thomas and her Chicago-based followers arrived in 1980. Both church members and leaders, as well as local residents, accused the other of racism, through words, attitudes, or actions.

Thomas was reported to have a hostile approach to those who were not members of CMHCC, in particular law enforcement officials, who reported she addressed them as "white boy".

The regional commander of the Arizona Department of Public Safety stated that Sheriff Judd "asked the governor for a tank to go into the Valley to annihilate those niggers." A federal judge ruled that the sheriff's department was riddled with racism: "It seems to me that everyone in Cochise County was going to get their licks against the church one way or another." "Children at Play" signs were erected by the county, at the request of the church. On the signs were cartoon stereotypes of distinctly African-American children. The children's clothing carried the letters "A" and "N", which Thomas interpreted as referring to "asshole" and "nigger". The signs were removed. Allegations of official racism were raised during the 1984 trial, including a flier that referred to 'blacks as "porch monkeys" 'that was pinned up on a sheriff's station bulletin board.

Documented evidence was presented in court of students yelling "nigger" and "kill them" during a 1982 high school riot/melee (see below).

In June, 1982 the church filed a $75 million civil-rights lawsuit in federal court, naming eight county officials including Sheriff Judd. In June 1985 it was settled out of court by church officials and Cochise County for an undisclosed amount.

=== Negotiations ===
Negotiations between sheriff deputies and church leaders to effect the surrender of church members wanted for arrest were undertaken on several occasions. In one instance, the governor became directly involved. These situations arose after the deputies would try to arrest, serve warrants, or issue traffic tickets to church members who would flee into church property. Once there they would either go into hiding or church members would arrive en masse, surround, and sometimes attack the officers. At varying times church leaders intervened to either turn over the wanted persons, or they refused. At these times, under pressure from the sheriff's office and officials from the State Department of Public Safety, negotiations with church leaders were held.

=== Deaths of church children ===
In 1981 the deaths of four children of church members came to the attention of state officials. State officials said the four children, in particular six-year-old Theriel Drew who died of strangulated hernia after four days of agonized screaming, might have survived had the church members not refused to administer medical treatment, citing their belief in faith healing. Authorities tried to place other children there under state supervision. In December 1981 the Arizona Court of Appeals ruled there was sufficient reason to declare the Drew children dependants of the state to ensure their proper medical care. The decision was later overturned by the Arizona Supreme Court, citing protection of religious beliefs.

=== Sherman McCane attack ===
On September 7, 1981, sheriff's deputies entered church property and found a large and angry group of church members surrounding a pick-up truck with two occupants. The crowd, estimated by the deputies to number over fifty, were waving weapons (pipes, steel rebar, clubs, pistols, and rifles) and shouting threats at the truck's occupants. One of the truck's occupants yelled racial epithets at the crowd, inflaming tempers. The deputies moved in to protect the occupants and one church member, Sherman McCane, punched one of the deputies twice.

Additional deputies arrived and the pickup truck was allowed to depart before the deputies left. The County Attorney issued an arrest warrant for McCane and he was arrested on charges of assaulting an officer. He was also charged with carrying a concealed weapon, which was discovered at the time of his arrest. On September 10, two church members, William Thomas Jr. and Dorothy Collins, arrived at the Sierra Vista sheriff's substation demanding to see McCane. Collins was arrested for carrying an illegal weapon.

=== Van explosion ===
On September 10, 1981, a homemade bomb accidentally detonated in a twelve-passenger van as it headed on Hwy 92 from Miracle Valley towards Sierra Vista. The van was owned by a William Thomas Jr. Passenger and church member Steven Lindsey was killed instantly when the bomb detonated while on his lap. Three other passengers were injured, all of whom left the scene before law enforcement officers arrived. The highway was closed for a full day while investigations were conducted by local and federal officials. Three undetonated bombs were found in the van's remains, one with six sticks of dynamite, as well as batteries, fuses, and wires.

Pastor Thomas claimed the bombs were planted by law enforcement officials. The ATF had previously inspected the church property and found a cache of dynamite, which was not illegal at the time. Records of a nearby dynamite company and newspaper articles at the time quoted unidentified sources indicated that church members bought the dynamite found in the van. Thomas stated the church members did not know how to make a bomb and that the dynamite was purchased for a church-owned mine. There is no record of the church owning a mine. It was speculated that the occupants of the van were on their way to Sierra Vista to release church member Sherman McCane by blowing up vehicles as a distraction before blowing out the wall of the station where he was being held on charges of assault and carrying a concealed weapon.

=== Removal of children ===
In late 1981 Lester Triplett contacted authorities in Arizona in attempt to retrieve his four children, who had been spirited away from their Mississippi home by his daughter, Susie Mae McCane (wife of Sherman McCane). Triplett was their legal guardian and his daughter had misrepresented her guardianship and fraudulently enrolled them in the local school. The school suspended the students and several more when similar questions about their guardianship became known. The children were then home-schooled at the church.

When deputies tried to enforce a court order to retrieve three of the children from the church, they were surrounded by a group of church members while the children were removed. After tense negotiations with Pastor Thomas, the children were released to the custody of their father. While retrieving Lora Triplett from her high school, church students surrounded and violently attacked the deputies. Seven were arrested. After a court hearing, Triplett was given permission to take his four children back to Mississippi. Susie Mae McCane was later charged with and acquitted of perjury regarding this matter.

=== High school riot/melee ===
On April 19, 1982, a clash occurred between two groups of students at the local Buena High School, church members and non-church members. Police arrested a church member for assaulting a female bystander. The student was charged with felony assault. The next day a group of 20 church members, including both students and William Thomas Jr. (Pastor Thomas' son), reportedly entered school grounds looking for the group of white students from the previous day's altercation. Approximately 12 police and sheriff's deputies arrived. While attempting to make an arrest, they were attacked by the church members and one deputy rendered unconscious.

William Thomas Jr. blocked police cars with his own vehicle while a group of students dragged nearby motorists from their car and stole their cars. The deputies pursued them in a 20-mile, 100 mph (160 km/h) chase which ended in the church compound where a large group of church members blocked them from entering. The law enforcement officers left and obtained search warrants in search of evidence against those who became known as the "Buena Fifteen" but were dissuaded from serving them by the head of Arizona DPS and the governor's office.

Negotiations between the church leaders and Department of Public Safety trying to resolve the issue of the church harboring the Buena Fifteen after the high school riot/melee stalemated after a week. The day after the televised hammer-throwing incident (below), Governor Bruce Babbitt intervened and persuaded Thomas to arrange for the fugitives to be turned over to police, which they were on May 1. Five were charged, and three were convicted and sentenced to, respectively, five years for armed robbery, three-and-a-half years for aggravated assault, and 30 days for assaulting a law enforcement officer.

=== Hammer throwing ===
On April 29, 1982, a news crew from Tucson television station KOLD-TV came to Miracle Valley in the aftermath of the high school riot/melee. One news crew was attacked by several church members throwing claw hammers. The incident was filmed by a second news crew and broadcast nationally and internationally. Five women were charged in this incident, two of whom were convicted of assault in early 1983.

== The shootout ==
On October 22, 1982, sheriff's deputies arrived on church property to serve arrest warrants to two church members, Frank Bernard and Billy Bernard. An estimated 20 church members armed with sticks and guns surrounded the deputies and forced them to retreat.

That evening Sheriff Judd spoke with the head of Arizona DPS advising him he felt that a show of force was required and requested backup. The Sheriff's office held a meeting around midnight on October 22 to plan a course of action for the following morning. Their plan involved a minimum show of force—two deputies in one car—with additional backup waiting in two locations over a mile away out of sight of the compound.

At approximately 7:40 on the morning of October 23, a single sheriff's car entered the compound and stopped near the intersection of Faith Ave and Honeysuckle Road, in the middle of the subdivision on the north side of the highway. There were 17 cars with 35 deputies nearby ready to provide backup. After the deputies knocked on several house doors trying to locate their targets, a car drove up and discharged angry church members. After being attacked by a man swinging a pipe in a deputy's face, the deputies called for backup as guns appeared in windows of the houses. The police cars arrived and took positions up around the two open fields. An estimated 150 church members—men, women, and children—confronted and attacked the deputies with sticks, rocks, pipes, lumber, garden rakes, knives, and firearms.

Shots were fired from multiple weapons. William Thomas Jr. arrived and was seen unloading multiple guns from his car. One neighbor and at least one deputy, both non church members, witnessed long-barrelled guns being aimed and firing at the deputies. Deputies reported multiple bullets whizzing past them.

After being attacked by multiple church members, Sheriff Deputy Ray Thatcher was confronted by William Thomas Jr. carrying a rifle. Thatcher, who was the designated SWAT sniper for the day of the shootout, fired his Ruger Mini-14 semi-automatic rifle from close range, killing William Thomas Jr. and Aruguster Tate (Thomas Jr.'s father-in-law) during the shootout. Thatcher claimed Thomas circled around him pointing a cocked rifle, possibly a Winchester Model 1894, at him, while facing him, before Thatcher fired. Thatcher also claimed that Tate then stooped down and picked up Thomas's rifle and pointed it at Thatcher before he fired. Thatcher admitted to shooting both men, each of whom was struck with four bullets. Of the reported hundreds of firearms rounds fired during the shootout, the only ones reported to be from law enforcement officers were those of Deputy William Townsend and a single shot from Deputy Rod Rothrock.

Multiple deputies received injuries including compound bone fractures, shattered knuckles, deep lacerations from broken glass, and wounds from shotgun pellets. In total, two church members were killed, and seven deputies and two church members were hospitalized. One deputy, six-years veteran Deputy Sheriff Jeffrey Carl Brown, died on September 26, 1983, because of aneurysm from injuries he sustained at the day of the shooting after he was assaulted and struck in the chest with a five-foot long metal pipe, causing him to suffer a bruised heart. One of the injured church members was rendered paraplegic when a bullet fired by another church member hit his spine, and died in 1987.

The melee lasted an estimated 15 minutes before law enforcement officers retreated from the church compound.

== Aftermath ==
Arizona DPS and Pima County Sheriff's deputies arrived soon after the shootout ended. The FBI later arrived on the scene to conduct the investigation at the invitation of the governor. Deputy Larry A. Dever (who became the sheriff of Cochise County from 1997 until his death in a car accident in 2012) was injured by a single gunshot wound in the face. Dever's longtime friend and partner, Korean War veteran and Sheriff Jimmy Judd (1933–2005), was deeply affected by the shootout for the rest of his life.

Some church members were arrested during the shootout; others were identified by photographs taken by deputies and by a news photographer. Charges were laid against 19 church members for their alleged part in the shootout. The trial was prosecuted by a State Attorney in neighboring Pima County. In February 1984 charges were dropped due to Cochise County refusing to pay for legal aid defense of the indigent defendants, claiming insufficient funds in their budget. The judge ruled dismissal with prejudice, meaning the defendants could not face the same charges in future.

=== Forensic results ===
Tate and Thomas were each struck with four rounds from Sheriff Deputy Thatcher's weapon. Forensic analysis and expert testimony presented during the trial indicated that the fatal shots all struck the victims from the side or the rear and that it was not possible to conclude from which direction the other, non-fatal, shots were fired, or which order they were fired. The same forensic expert testified that the forensic evidence "scientifically repudiates Thatcher's accounts" of the shooting. Sheriff's deputies claimed to have seen a woman retrieving the rifle and carrying it away. The church claimed the victims were unarmed. No rifle attributable to being in the possession of the victims was found. Attorneys for the church claimed that lie detector tests on witnesses showed they were truthful in claiming they witnessed the victims were shot in the back by the deputy. Thatcher's actions were investigated and ruled justified by county, state, and federal investigators.

=== Jesse Jackson ===
In late 1982, leader of the civil rights organization Operation PUSH Jesse Jackson, conducted a one-day visit to Miracle Valley after the shooting. He met with the sheriff, church leaders, and others. Upon departing he reportedly announced that the two church members who had been killed were "shot in the back". He claimed to have given to the government some 400 photographs of the shooting incident taken by a news photographer.

Funerals for Thomas Jr. and Tate were held at the headquarters of PUSH in Chicago.

=== Later church matters ===
In the spring of 1983, Frances Thomas announced the church and its members were returning to Chicago and the congregation was re-established on the south side of Chicago. Church members reportedly left Miracle Valley soon afterwards, some simply abandoning their homes and properties.

In 1987, twenty-six former members of CVHCC sued Frances Thomas for $2 million, alleging she committed fraud by using their contributions to purchase property in her own name instead of the church's. The property in Miracle Valley included a large home used by Thomas and others, the church building, a store, and approximately 25 vacant lots. The lawsuit was later dropped.

In 1989 the church attempted to relocate to suburban Markham, Illinois, before moving to Harvey, Illinois.

Frances Thomas died in 1995. The church continues to operate, initially under the leadership of two of Frances Thomas' daughters, Margaret and Irma (died 2023).

== References and bibliography ==
Bibliography:
• Daniel, William R.: Shootout at Miracle Valley, Wheatmark, Tucson, 2009. ISBN 978-1-60494-152-4
• Wecht, Cyril H., and Saitz, Greg: Mortal Evidence: The Forensic Evidence Behind Nine Shocking Cases, Prometheus Books, Amherst NY, 2007. ISBN 978-1-59102-485-9
