= A. A. Allen =

American Pentecostal evangelist (1911–1970)

- Born: Asa Alonso Allen; March 27, 1911; Sulphur Rock, Arkansas, U.S.
- Died: June 11, 1970 (aged 59); San Francisco, California, U.S.
- Occupation(s): Evangelist, faith healer
- Title: Head of A. A. Allen Revivals, Inc.
- Successor: Don Stewart
- Spouse: Lexie (m. 1936; sep. 1962)
- Children: Four

Asa Alonso Allen (March 27, 1911 – June 11, 1970), better known as A. A. Allen, was an American Pentecostal evangelist known for his faith healing and deliverance ministry. He was, for a time, associated with the "Voice of Healing" movement founded by Gordon Lindsay. Allen died of alcoholism and liver failure in a coma at the age of 59 in San Francisco, California, and was buried at his ministry headquarters in Miracle Valley, Arizona.

== Early life ==
A. A. Allen's early life was lived in an often unpleasant environment. Having been born of mixed race to white and Native American parents, his family was very poor and his father was an alcoholic.

At the age of 23, Allen became a Christian at the Onward Methodist Church in Miller, Missouri. Later, he learned of the Baptism with the Holy Spirit from a Pentecostal preacher who was conducting meetings in his home. Allen soon felt the call to preach and affiliated himself with the Assemblies of God, subsequently obtaining ordination from them in 1936. He then began to pastor a small church in Colorado. By 1947, Allen was pastoring a large Assemblies of God church in Corpus Christi, Texas.

After attending a tent revival meeting hosted by Oral Roberts in 1949, Allen testified that as he left that meeting he hoped to form a divine healing ministry. Allen asked his church board to allow him to start a radio program, but they refused. Allen soon resigned from his church and began holding healing revival meetings.

== Revivalist ==
Stemming in part from many reported healings, Allen established a large following. He became one of the first ministers to develop a national television ministry, which frequently included excerpts from his "healing line" ministry. By the late 1960s, however, music formed an increasingly dominant part of Allen's programs, which was generally performed by African-American singer and choir leader Gene Martin.

In 1955, Allen purchased a large tent for $8,500. He was soon one of the major healing evangelists on the healing revival circuit. Allen's revival meetings were similar to the other leading evangelists of the time (such as Roberts, Jack Coe, and William Branham) in that meetings were typically characterized by preaching, testimony, music, and praying for the sick. As was the case with other ministers of the time, Allen's healing ministry was facilitated by the use of "prayer cards" obtained in advance by those requesting prayer for healing.

In 1955, Allen was arrested for suspicion of drunk driving after a controversial incident in Knoxville, Tennessee. He resigned from the Assemblies of God shortly afterward. After paying a fine without contest in order to avoid terminating his Knoxville meetings which were then in progress, Allen was re-ordained by his "Miracle Revival Fellowship." His associate Don Stewart claimed that Allen was occasionally drunk after Knoxville, and that his staff covered for him.

Allen continued on the revival circuit, and in 1958 he purchased a tent previously used by Coe that could seat over 22,000. He became one of the first evangelists to propagate the prosperity gospel, calling poverty a "spirit" and expounding God's ability to perform miracles financially. At his peak, Allen appeared on fifty-eight radio stations daily, as well as forty-three television stations. At the time of his death, his headquarters in Miracle Valley, Arizona was 2,400 acres (9.7 km^{2}) with its own airfield.

At that time, A. A. Allen Revivals, Inc. was publishing "well over" 60 million pieces of literature a year. The circulation of Miracle Magazine, published monthly by the Allen ministry, was 450,000 at the time of his death. The magazine included, at times, accounts of healings, but gave a disclaimer that the magazine does not "assume legal responsibility" of its accuracy. Gerald W. King, the business manager of Miracle Valley, was quoted in 1969, shortly before Allen's death, as saying, "We take in $2 million a year, and our expenses are $2 million a year." He added that Miracle Valley's annual payroll was $84,000.

Few of Allen's supposed miracles ever underwent "scrutiny of physicians" and at his revivals in small print his disclaimer read: "A. A. Allen Revivals, Inc. assumes no legal responsibility for the veracity of any such report." One source, The Encyclopedia of American Religions, claims that Allen did not like press coverage, which "resulted in his hiring of 'goon squads' to punch out anyone who showed up for Allen's tent revivals with a notepad or camera."

Eventually, most of the evangelists had wheelchairs available for people who had bad backs and couldn't stand in a healing line for hours. But when the evangelist got to them and pulled them up out of the wheelchair, some in the audience thought they were walking for the first time or that they had come to the revival in that wheelchair.

In his television programs, Allen or his ministry associates made frequent mention of the fact that his meetings were racially integrated. African-Americans sat alongside whites in the choir, the ministers' section, and the congregation. African-American musical talent was frequently highlighted in Allen's television programs, especially in the 1960s. This racial attitude also found its expression in Allen's sermon record album titled, Did God Call the Apostle Paul to Preach the Gospel to the Black Man? The album cover refers to Allen as "no doubt the first evangelist on a great national or international scale to preach integration to huge crowds in the North and the South ..." This was something of an exaggeration, though perhaps in keeping with Allen's personality. Mainstream revivalist Billy Graham, while not always consistent, had desegregated many of his revivals as early as 1953 in Chattanooga, Tennessee, and integrated all his revivals following the Brown v. Board of Education decision in 1954.

Another major theme in Allen's ministry was his unrelenting attacks on what he characterized as dead, formal, denominational religion. This was a theme of a number of his televised messages and of such Miracle Valley publications as Allen's book titled Let My People Go! This was also the theme of a book authored by Clarence G. Mitchell and published by Allen's ministry, titled Starving Sheep and Overfed Shepherds (1963). Allen regarded "denominationalism" as a sin. This is reflected in the subtitle of Mitchell's book: "Takes the Cover Off! Brings the Sin of Denominationalism Out into the Open!"

At a revival meeting on January 1, 1958, in Phoenix, Arizona, recent convert Urbane Leiendecker approached Allen and offered him 1,280 acres (5.2 km^{2}) of land. This property, later expanded, was then named "Miracle Valley." As such, it served as the ministry headquarters for A. A. Allen Revivals, Inc. This location housed Miracle Valley Bible College and its dorms and classrooms; a domed church; administrative buildings; a large warehouse; a residential neighborhood called Miracle Valley Estates; a publishing and printing plant; a four-press phonograph record plant; and Miracle Valley Fellowship, which served as a ministerial fellowship with about 10,000 ministers as members. In spite of the presence of its own print shop, however, Miracle Valley business manager Gerald King said in 1969 that the ministry spent $27,000 per month "farming out" jobs to other print shops that could not be handled on site.

In 1963, A. A. Allen Revivals, Inc. successfully sued the Internal Revenue Service (IRS) in an attempt to get the government to refund collections of the Federal Insurance Contributions Act taxes for 1958–59.

In 1967, Allen and his wife, Lexie E. (Scriven) Allen, were divorced. They had four children. One of them, Paul Asa Allen, is the author of In the Shadow of Greatness – Growing Up Allen.

== Death ==
Allen died at the Jack Tar Hotel in San Francisco, California, on June 11, 1970, at the age of 59. He died after a heavy drinking binge. Don Stewart, his successor, was accused of attempting "to clean up evidence of his mentor's alcoholic binge in a San Francisco hotel before the police arrived". Stewart says he was not trying to cover up anything but was trying to protect Allen. Nonetheless, police found his body in a "room strewn with pills and empty liquor bottles".

However, following a twelve-day investigation and an autopsy, the coroner's report concluded Allen died from liver failure brought on by acute alcoholism. The coroner reported that when Allen died, he had a blood alcohol content of .36 which was "enough to ensure a deep coma".

Stewart says that Allen's problems with alcohol followed his problems with depression associated with extreme pain from arthritic bone spurs for which he was reluctant to seek medical attention because of his faith in divine healing and preaching that relying on doctors was a failure to trust in God.

In 2022, Allen's granddaughter, Cheryl Bryan made a claim that the coroner's report had in fact been falsified.

Allen was buried at Miracle Valley, on June 15, 1970.

== Legacy and property ==
After Allen's death, Stewart gained possession of Allen's organization, including his Miracle Valley property, which he renamed the Don Stewart Evangelistic Association (and later the Don Stewart Association). Stewart "went from pounding tent stakes at Allen's revivals to driving a truck to preaching". In addition, Stewart "was hit with allegations of embezzlement by Allen's brother-in-law, of pocketing offerings from the revivals" in the wake of Allen's death. Nonetheless, the activities of the Don Stewart Association were moved to Phoenix, and the Bible college continued to operate in Miracle Valley until 1975. Stewart then leased the campus to the Hispanic Assemblies by a twenty-year lease agreement for merely $1 per year. They opened the Spanish-speaking Southern Arizona Bible College.

Between 1979 and early 1983, the Christ Miracle Healing Center and Church (CMHCC) operated on the subdivision property on the north side of Highway 92 across from the bible church. CMHCC, which consisted of approximately 300 African-American members, was led by Allen followers Frances Thomas and her son "Bishop" William Thomas Jr. Initially relations between locals and CMHCC members relocated from Mississippi – both of whom were followers of Allen – were peaceful and in keeping with Allen's theme of racial harmony and integration; however, once the Thomases and the Chicago-based followers moved to Arizona, relations quickly deteriorated, and church members began to isolate themselves and started professing what locals said was an "anti-white doctrine." CMHCC's doctrine of exclusive use of faith healing resulted in the death of six-year-old Therial Davis, and as many as four additional children.

In 1979, Miracle Valley closed after bankruptcy hearings. In September 1982, the Southern Arizona Bible College's main administration building and vast warehouse were destroyed by arson. The main building was valued at $2 million. Stewart sent multiple donation requests to some people on his 100,000 person mailing list "even though his ministry is not associated with the college and the fire damage was insured." According to the press, one of his letters "gave the impression ... the fire had crippled Stewart's ministry" and another purported to include the building's ashes with a request for $200 donations. Stewart's church had issues over his financing and "questioned Stewart's fundraising techniques" before. In addition, Stewart was accused by his church of arson, something he denies.

The insurance company offered to either pay $1.5 million for the reconstruction of the administration building or $1 million for a "cash-out." Stewart was not interested in rebuilding and intended to take the cash-out; however, the Spanish Assemblies of God (Central Latin American District Council of the Assemblies of God) wanted the facilities to be rebuilt. Subsequently, Stewart accepted the insurance money of $1 million for Miracle Valley, and the Assemblies of God would receive the Miracle Valley campus consisting of fifteen buildings and nearly 80 acres (320,000 m^{2}) of land for $6 which equated to $1 per year for the previous six years. However, Stewart forced the Assemblies of God to maintain a Bible college for a minimum of twenty years, or the property would revert to his ministry. In 1995, exactly twenty years later, the Assemblies of God closed Southern Arizona Bible College and put the campus up for sale.

In 1982, the group had several confrontations with utility workers, neighbors, and eventually law enforcement, culminating in what became known as the Miracle Valley shootout in October 1982, during which two members of the church were killed and multiple sheriff's deputies were injured.

Miracle Valley Bible College was purchased by Harter Ministries in August 1999, and the school continued under the administration of Melvin Harter. As the Miracle Valley Bible College and Seminary, the institution taught students in classical Pentecostal theology. However, in January 2009 a Phoenix-based mortgage firm foreclosed on the property, which currently contains several dilapidated buildings. Before the previous owner left the property, the entire north section of Sanctuary roof was removed.

On December 20, 2011, the purchase of the property by the Langevin family was approved by the State of Arizona. The Langevins operate a non-denominational ministry called Miracle Valley Arizona Ministries. In 2014, another group purchased the property with plans to re-establish a Bible college.

== Selected bibliography ==
=== By A. A. Allen ===
- 1953 – Demon Possession Today and How to Be Free
- 1953 – God Will Heal You
- 1953 – How to Renew Your Youth Without Medicine, Drugs, or Surgery
- 1953 – The Man Whose Number is 666!
- 1954 – God's Last Message to a Dying World
- 1954 – How to Have Freedom from Fear, Worry, Nerves
- 1954 – How to Have Power Over the Devil
- 1954 – My Vision of the Destruction of America Atop the Empire State Building
- 1958 – If I Make My Bed in Hell
- 1964 – Command Ye Me!
- 1967 – Bargain Counter Religion
- 1967 – Is It Religion or Racket? Faith or Fear?
- 1968 – God's Guarantee to Bless and Prosper You Financially
- 1968 – Witchcraft, Wizards and Witches
- 1970 – Born to Lose, Bound to Win, autobiography written with Walter Wagner

Undated

- America's Sore Evil
- Can God?
- Divorce and the Lying Demon
- Does God Heal through Medicine?
- Except it Be for Fornication
- God's Guarantee to Heal You
- Let My People Go!
- My Besetting Sin!

=== Published by A. A. Allen Publications ===
- 1954 – God's Man of Faith and Power: The Life Story of A. A. Allen by his wife, Lexie E. Allen
- 1963 – Starving Sheep and Overfed Shepherds by Clarence G. Mitchell

Undated

- Demons Are Real Today!, a collection of drawings by a young girl
- Meet your Evangelist, by Rev. Kent Rogers

== Discography ==
Allen formed Miracle Revival Recordings to sell recordings of his singing and preaching, his demon exorcism, and the musical artists who were featured in his tent meetings. Since his death a number of audio and video recordings of his tent revivals and his meetings at Miracle Valley have been released in various formats. The following is a partial list of phonograph recordings featuring Allen:

- 1971 Indian Camp Meeting
- Born to Lose, Bound to Win (EP)
- Did God Call the Apostle Paul to Preach the Gospel to the Black Man? (sermon by Allen, LP)
- Do Your Thing for God (sermon by Allen, LP)
- God is a Killer! (sermon by Allen, LP, 1965)
- God's Last Message (sermon by Allen, LP)
- Harvest Time (music sung by Allen and others, LP, Miracle Revival #139)
- He Died As a Fool Dieth (sermon by Allen, LP)
- The Healer of Broken Hearts (LP)
- Miracle Camp Meeting
- Reach Out and Touch the Lord (Allen and others, LP)
- Restoration Revival Alive (music by Allen and others, LP)
- Sounds of Revival (by Allen and others, LP)
- Sudden Destruction, No Remedy!/Spiritual Suicide! (sermons by Allen, LP)
- Talking Bible: Healing-Health Edition (scriptures read by Allen, LP)
- What Then (sermon by Allen, LP)
