= Albert Odulele =

Nigerian pastor (born 1964)

Albert Taiwo Tokunbo Odulele (born 5 January 1964) is a Nigerian-British pastor.

== Early life ==
Odulele was born as a twin in London at St. Mary's Hospital, Whittington to Nigerian parents Abel Oyebajo and Patience Aotola. Odulele spent his formative years in Nigeria and emigrated to the United Kingdom in 1986. He started Glory House in 1993. Odulele married in 1995. He was convicted of two counts of sexual assault in 2011.

== Career ==
Odulele graduated from Ogun State University (now Olabisi Onabanjo University) in Nigeria with a Bachelor of Science in Medicine and Surgery in 1989.

Following his relocation to the United Kingdom, he worked for the British civil service for a short period of time.

Odulele founded a Charismatic church called Glory Bible church in 1993 at a former funeral home in Leyton, East London. It became Glory House in 1999 and now meets at Tabernacle Avenue in Plaistow, London. The Church has branches in Nigeria, started by Albert Odulele in 2016; Kenya founded in 2014 and Brazil.

== Criminal conviction ==
In February 2011, various media outlets reported that Albert Odulele was charged with two counts of sexual assault involving two male youths, one of whom was a boy under 16 years of age. Odulele pleaded guilty and confessed that he had been battling with his sexuality for many years. Odulele was sentenced at Woolwich Crown Court to eight months in prison and placed on the UK sex offenders' register for five years. His twin brother Vincent Odulele took over the church at that time. Facebook groups were established to support and to condemn Albert Odulele.

Having served some of his sentence, Odulele was released early from jail on 29 July 2011. He then resumed work as the pastor of Glory House. Warnings were issued by some media outlets upon his return to Nigeria in 2016 to start a Church branch there.

== Bibliography ==
Odulele has written and published several Christian non-fiction titles including:

- "The Bible Made Simple" Published in 2001 OCLC 58998340
- "Understanding God's Voice" Published in 2003 ISBN 9781902008066
- "Divine Inspiration"
- "Eternity Unveiled"
- "Divine Assignment Indicators"
- "This Crisis is for your Increase"

He has published a blog on the Glory House Church website.

== Personal life ==
Odulele married Mary Abosede in 1995. They have two children; Christopher Olufemi and Tiana Morojureoluwa.
