= Joshua Iginla =

Nigerian televangelist (born 1969)

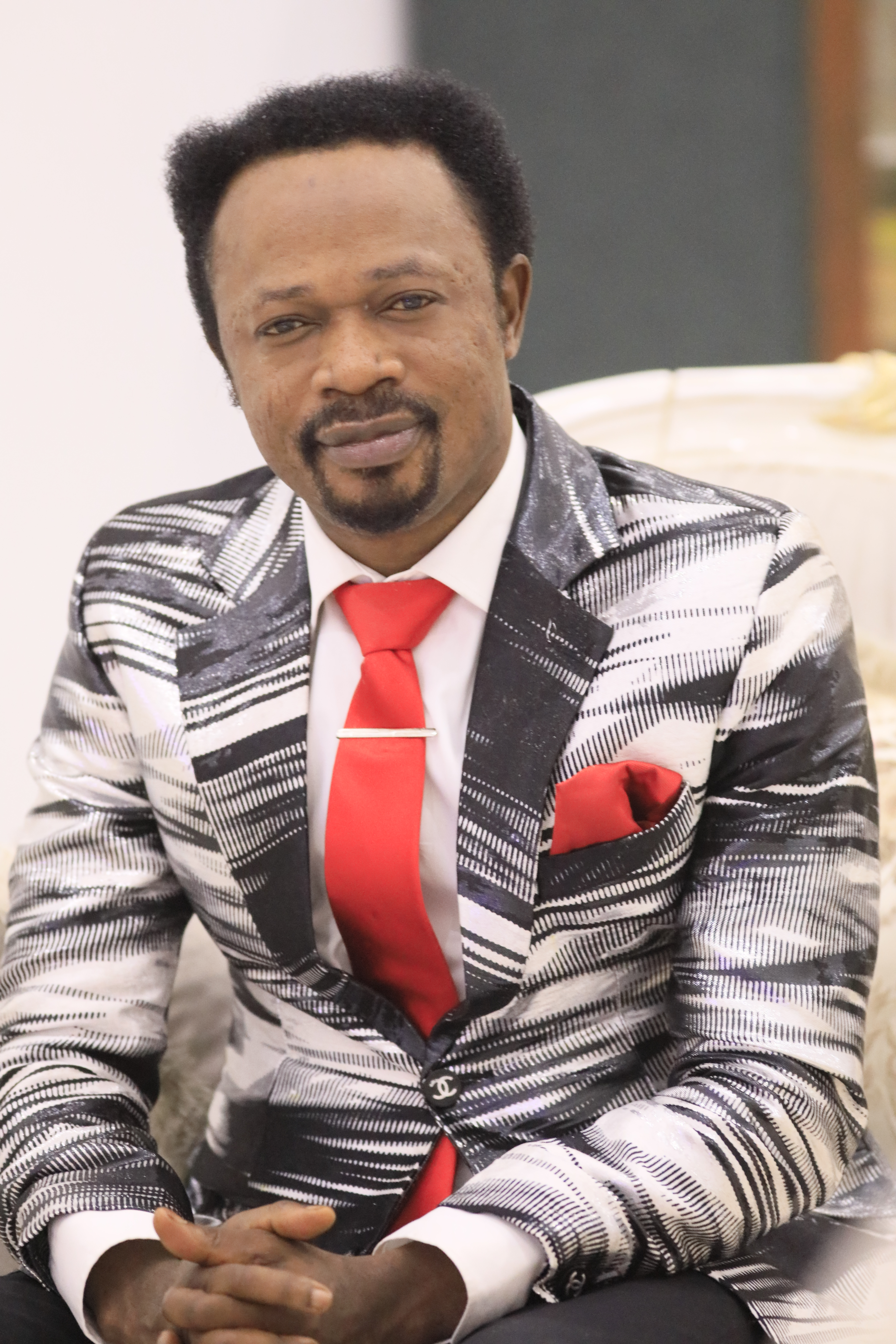
- Born: 21 May 1969 (age 57); Ado-Ekiti, Ekiti State, Nigeria
- Other name: Brother Joshua
- Occupations: Pastor, faith healing minister, televangelist
- Employer: Champion Royal Assembly
- Spouses: Yemisi Iginla (divorced. 2019) Stella Iginla (m. 2020)
- Children: 4

Joshua Iginla (born 21 May 1969) is a Nigerian pastor, televangelist, and prosperity gospel preacher regarded by some as a prophet. He is the founder and senior pastor of the Champions Royal Assembly, a megachurch which meets in an 80,000 seat auditorium in Kubwa, Abuja, Nigeria.

== Early life ==
Iginla was born on 21 May 1969 to Muslim parents in Ado-Ekiti, Ekiti State. He later converted to Christianity and subsequently became a Pentecostal pastor and televangelist.

== Personal life ==
In 2019, Iginla told his congregation that he and his wife Yemisi had extramarital affairs and had children outside marriage. In an interview, Yemisi Iginla denied that she had affairs, and in May 2020, Business Post reported that the couple had divorced and that Joshua Iginla had remarried to a South African.

== Private jet ==
In 2019, Iginla celebrated his birthday with a new private jet which the Nigerian daily newspaper Vanguard reported was necessary for his busy international preaching itinerary.

== Controversies ==
He had a public spat with Pastor Chris Okotie following the death of T.B. Joshua. He was said to have opined that Joshua "was a gift to mankind and humanity", while describing him as "firstborn among the prophets who took the bullet for so many of us".
