= Leroy Jenkins (televangelist) =

American televangelist and preacher

- Born: February 19, 1934; Greenwood, South Carolina, U.S.
- Died: June 21, 2017 (aged 83); Florida, U.S.
- Known for: Founder and president of Leroy Jenkins Ministries, Scottsdale, Arizona
- Spouses: Ruby Garrett (m. 1953; div. 1975) Linda Peck (m. 1977; div. 1977) Eloise Thomas (m. 2001; ann. 2001)
- Children: 7 (with Garrett)
- Mother: W.M. Jenkins
- Website: http://www.leroyjenkins.com

Leroy Jenkins (February 19, 1934 – June 21, 2017) was an American televangelist and preacher who was popular in the 1960s and 1970s. He was known for his faith healing, through the use of "miracle water". His television program can be seen on stations across the U.S. and internationally on Christian television networks. Jenkins's mother, W. M. Jenkins, was also an evangelist in Florida during the 1960s and 1970s.

== Career ==
Jenkins was known for his faith healing, through the use of "miracle water". In 2003, while based in Delaware, Ohio, Jenkins' "miracle water", drawn from a well on the grounds of his 30-acre (12 ha) religious compound known as the Healing Waters Cathedral, was found to contain coliform bacteria by the Ohio Department of Agriculture. Jenkins claimed tests conducted by independent laboratories all found the water safe for drinking and that the state ignored his findings. Jenkins was later fined $200 because he didn't have a license to sell the water.

In 1979, Jenkins was convicted in Greenwood, South Carolina, of conspiracy to assault two men and of plotting the arson of two homes. Jenkins was sentenced to 20 years in prison, with eight years suspended, for the incident. In 1994, he was arrested for grand theft, but the charges were soon dropped when he agreed to pay restitution. In 2001, his marriage to a 77-year-old widow, a black woman who had recently hit the Ohio Lottery jackpot for $6,000,000, was annulled by a judge in Delaware, Ohio. The legal guardian of Eloise Thomas, whose husband had died just three weeks before the marriage to Jenkins, former Ohio state senator Ben Espy, claimed on behalf of the woman's family that Thomas was incompetent and therefore incapable of knowing what she was doing when she attempted to marry Jenkins. Jenkins has repeatedly denied accusations that he was attempting to marry the woman for the sake of her net worth, which was estimated at $4,000,000.

In 2002, a film was released about his life, entitled The Calling (released on video as Man of Faith).

As of March 2011, Jenkins's ministry was based in Scottsdale, Arizona.

Jenkins released several Gospel albums over the course of his ministry career.

Jenkins died from complications of pneumonia on June 21, 2017.

=== Discography ===
- God Gave Me A Song
- If I Could Dream
- Mercy Wins
- Release Me
- Songs and Sermon In Bakersfield
- Songs To Be Healed By
- Stars In My Crown
- Touching Jesus

== In film ==
- The Calling - 2002.

== See also ==
- Glossolalia
- Pentecostalism
- Word of Faith
- Holy Spirit
