= Ralph Washington Sockman =

- Born: October 1, 1889; Mount Vernon, Ohio, U.S.
- Died: August 29, 1970 (aged 80); New York, New York, U.S.
- Spouse: Zellah Endly (m. 1916)
- Church: United Methodist
- Writings: Now to Live! How to Believe, Answering the Questions that Challenge Man's Faith; The Lord's Prayer; The Paradoxes of Jesus; Live for Tomorrow
- Congregations served: Christ Church, New York (1916–1961); National Radio Pulpit (1928–1962)

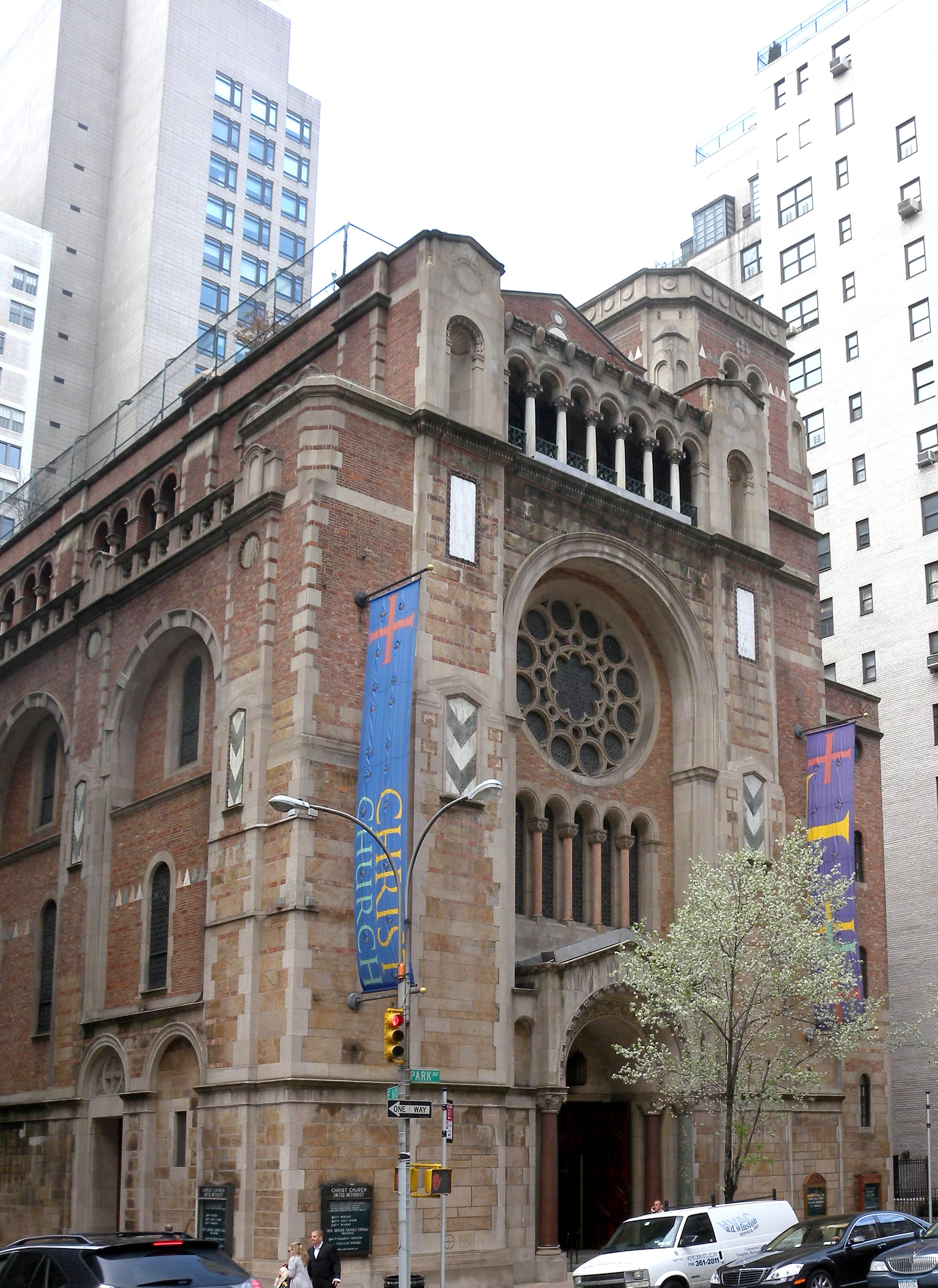
Christ Church United Methodist, Manhattan

Ralph Washington Sockman (October 1, 1889 – August 29, 1970) was the senior pastor of Christ Church (United Methodist) in New York City, United States. He gained considerable prominence in the U.S. as the featured speaker on the weekly NBC radio program, National Radio Pulpit, which aired from 1928 to 1962, and as a writer of several best-selling books on the Christian life. Time Magazine reported in 1946 that Sockman's National Radio Pulpit program received 4,000 letters weekly, making him "the number one Protestant radio pastor of the U.S. ...rated by volume of fan mail". Fifteen years later in 1961, Time said that Sockman was "generally acknowledged as the best Protestant preacher in the U.S.".

Sockman became the director of the Hall of Fame for Great Americans in 1949. In 1950, he was also appointed associate professor of practical theology at Union Theological Seminary in New York. Time Magazine said of him at the time:

Sunday morning at 10 E.S.T., from October through May, 60-year-old Dr. Sockman preaches on NBC's National Radio Pulpit to one of the biggest religious radio audiences in the U.S. Then, at his Byzantine-style church on Manhattan's Park Avenue, he holds a regular Sunday morning service (with enough ceremony and liturgy to jolt many a low-church Methodist). So many people come to hear him that at 5 in the afternoon he repeats his morning service.

He toured extensively for speaking engagements nationwide and often preached at the 6,000-seat Ocean Grove Auditorium on New Jersey's seashore, which was packed on "Sockman Sundays", as those occasions were popularly called. Some of his sermons from those appearances were subsequently published in 1939 as Ways of the Christian Life – Sermons by the Sea.

== Early years ==
Raised on a farm in Mount Vernon, Ohio, Ralph W. Sockman graduated from Ohio Wesleyan University, where he earned a Phi Beta Kappa key. He studied for the ministry at Union Theological Seminary in New York City. In 1916, he married Zellah Endly, the daughter of a Methodist minister, and became pastor of what was then called the Madison Avenue Methodist Episcopal Church, the forerunner of Christ Church in New York City.

== Writings ==
Sockman was a prolific writer, with some of his books still available and one, Now to Live!, reprinted in July 2007.

Other books include:

- The Paradoxes of Jesus (1936)
- Live for Tomorrow (1943)
- Date With Destiny; A Preamble To Christian Culture (1944)
- The Lord's Prayer (1947)
- How to Believe, Answering the Questions that Challenge Man's Faith (1953)

== Quotations ==
Ralph W. Sockman was especially noted for his memorable quips and sermon lines, such as:

- "The test of courage comes when we are in the minority. The test of tolerance comes when we are in the majority."
- "Nothing is so strong as gentleness and nothing is so gentle as real strength" in which he was quoting St. Francis de Sales.
- "Our growth depends not on how many experiences we devour, but on how many we digest."
