= Televangelism =

Use of radio and television to preach religion

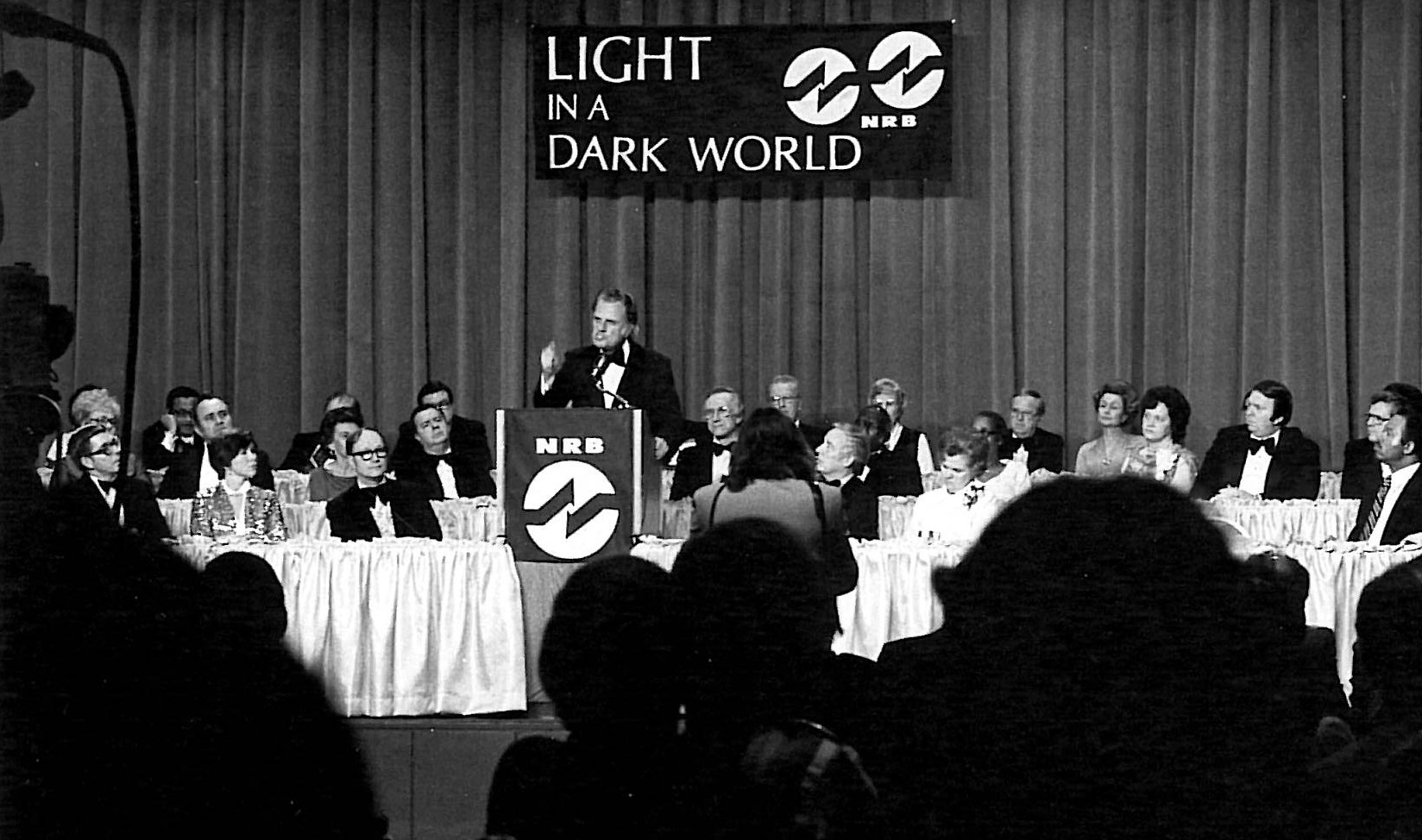
Evangelist Billy Graham speaks at the NRB convention, 1977

Televangelism (from televangelist, a blend of television and evangelist; occasionally termed radio evangelism or teleministry) is the utilization of media platforms such as radio and television for the marketing of religious messages, particularly Christianity and especially Evangelical Christianity.

Televangelists are either official or self-proclaimed ministers who devote a large portion of their ministry to television broadcasting. Some televangelists are also regular pastors or ministers in their own places of worship (often a megachurch), but the majority of their followers come from TV and radio audiences. Others do not have a conventional congregation, and work primarily through television. The term is also used derisively by critics as an insinuation of aggrandizement by such ministers.

Televangelism began as a uniquely American phenomenon, resulting from a largely deregulated media where access to television networks and cable TV is open to virtually anyone who can afford it, combined with a large Christian population that is able to provide the necessary funding. It became especially popular among Evangelical Protestant audiences, whether independent or organized around Christian denominations. However, the increasing globalisation of broadcasting has enabled some American televangelists to reach a wider audience through international broadcast networks, including some that are specifically Christian in nature.

Some countries have a more regulated media with either general restrictions on access or specific rules regarding religious broadcasting. In such countries, religious programming is typically produced by TV companies (sometimes as a regulatory or public service requirement) rather than private interest groups.

== Terminology ==
The word televangelism is a portmanteau of television and evangelism and it was coined in 1958 as the title of a television miniseries by the Southern Baptist Convention. Jeffrey K. Hadden and Charles E. Swann have been credited with popularising the word in their 1981 survey Prime Time Preachers: The Rising Power of Televangelism. However, the term televangelist was employed by Time magazine already in 1952, when telegenic Roman Catholic Bishop Fulton Sheen was referred to as the "first televangelist".

== History ==
=== Radio ===
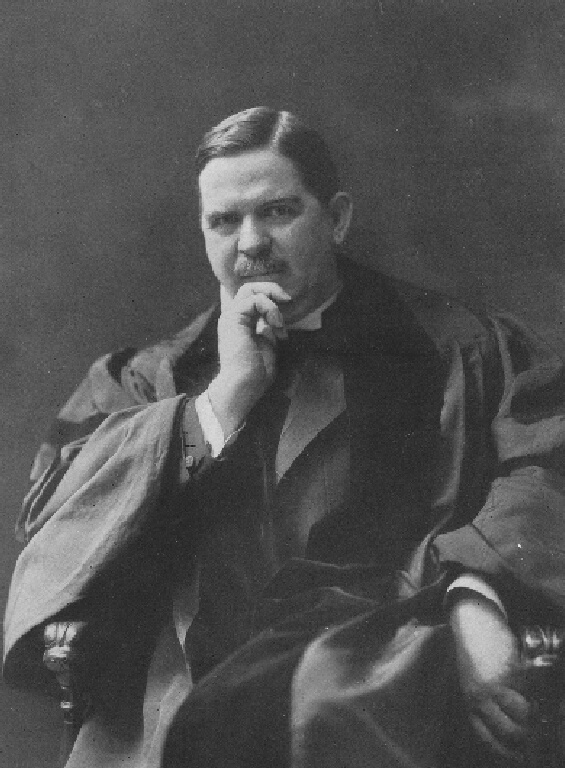
S. Parkes Cadman, one of the first ministers to use radio, beginning in 1923

Christianity has always emphasized preaching the gospel to the whole world, taking as inspiration the Great Commission. Historically, this was achieved by sending missionaries, beginning with the Dispersion of the Apostles, and later, after the invention of the printing press, included the distribution of Bibles and religious tracts. Some Christians realized that the rapid uptake of radio beginning in the 1920s, provided a powerful new tool for this task, and they were amongst the first producers of radio programming. Radio broadcasts were seen as a complementary activity to traditional missionaries, enabling vast numbers to be reached at relatively low cost, but also enabling Christianity to be preached in countries where this was illegal and missionaries were banned. The aim of Christian radio was to both convert people to Christianity and to provide teaching and support to believers. These activities continue today, particularly in the developing world. Shortwave radio stations with a Christian format broadcast worldwide, such as HCJB in Quito, Ecuador, Family Radio's WYFR, and the Bible Broadcasting Network (BBN), among others.

One of the first ministers to use radio extensively was S. Parkes Cadman, beginning in 1923. In 1923, Calvary Baptist Church in New York City was the first church to operate its own radio station. "Tell It From Calvary" is a radio show that the church still produces weekly; it's heard on WMCA AM570. By 1928, Cadman had a weekly Sunday afternoon radio broadcast on the NBC radio network, his powerful oratory reaching a nationwide audience of five million persons.

Aimee Semple McPherson was another pioneering tent-revivalist who soon turned to radio to reach a larger audience. Radio eventually gave her nationwide notoriety in the 1920s and 1930s, and she built one of the earliest Pentecostal megachurches.

In the U.S., the Great Depression of the 1930s saw a resurgence of revival-tent preaching in the Midwest and South, as itinerant traveling preachers drove from town to town, living off donations. Several preachers began radio shows as a result of their popularity.

In the 1930s, a famous radio evangelist of the period was Roman Catholic priest Father Charles Coughlin, whose strongly anti-Communist and antisemitic radio programs reached millions of listeners. Other early Christian radio programs broadcast nationwide in the U.S. beginning in the 1920s–1930s include (years of radio broadcast shown): Bob Jones, Sr. (1927–1962), Ralph W. Sockman (1928–1962), G. E. Lowman (1930–1965), Music and the Spoken Word (1929–present), The Lutheran Hour (1930–present), and Charles E. Fuller (1937–1968). Time magazine reported in 1946 that Rev. Ralph Sockman's National Radio Pulpit on NBC received 4,000 letters weekly and Roman Catholic archbishop Fulton J. Sheen received between 3,000 and 6,000 letters weekly. The total radio audience for radio ministers in the U.S. that year was estimated to be 10 million listeners.

An association of American Evangelical Protestant religious broadcasters, the National Religious Broadcasters, was founded in 1944.

=== Television ===
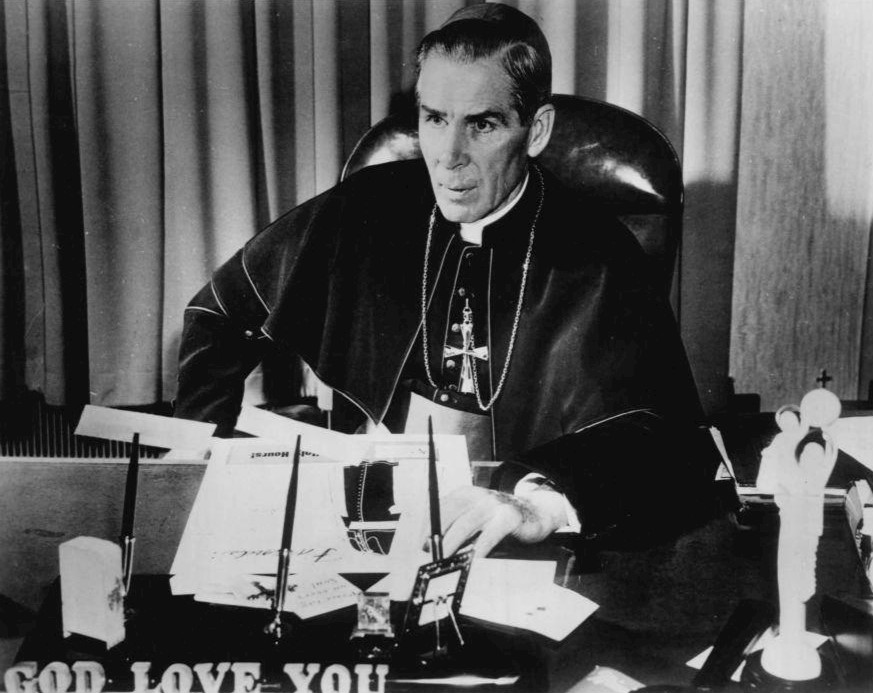
Archbishop Fulton Sheen, the first televangelist

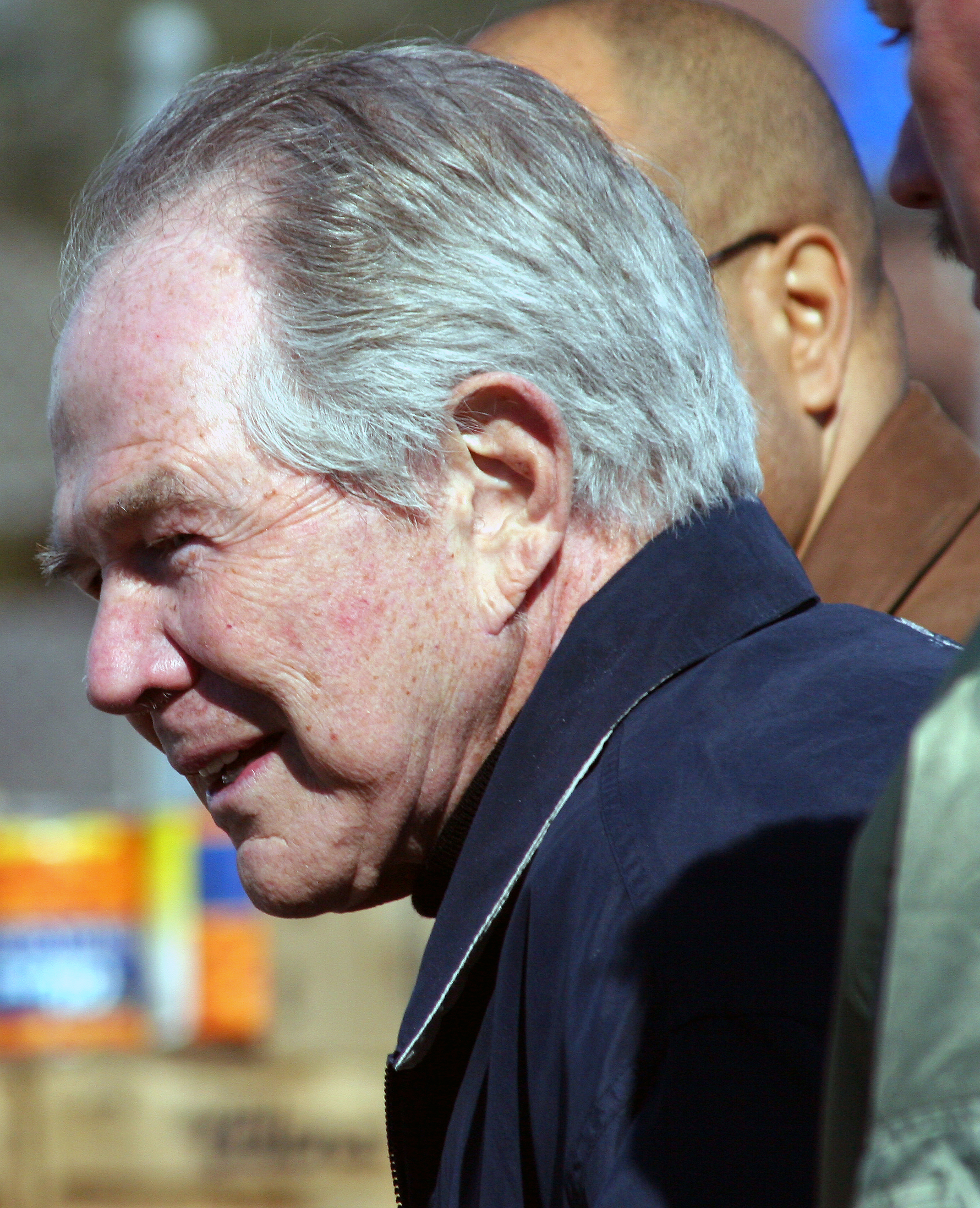
Pat Robertson, founder of the Christian Broadcasting Network

Although television also began in the 1930s, it was not commonly used for religious purposes until the early 1950s. Pope Pius XII became the first pope to deliver a televised message on April 17, 1949, giving an Easter greeting in French. Jack Wyrtzen and Percy Crawford switched to TV broadcasting in the spring of 1949. Another television preacher of note was Fulton J. Sheen, who successfully switched to television in 1951 after two decades of popular radio broadcasts, and whom Time called "the first 'televangelist'". Sheen won numerous Emmy Awards for his program, which ran from the early 1950s until the late 1960s.

In 1951, producer Dick Ross and Baptist evangelist Billy Graham founded the film production company World Wide Pictures, which made videos of his preaching and Christian films.

After years of radio broadcasting, in 1952 Rex Humbard became the first to have a weekly church service broadcast on television. By 1980, the Rex Humbard programs spanned the globe with 695 stations in 91 languages, the largest coverage of any evangelistic program at the time. By 1957, Oral Roberts's broadcast reached 80% of the possible television audience through 135 of the possible 500 stations. In Uruguay, Channel 4 has been airing the Roman Catholic Church mass since 1961.

Christian Broadcasting Network, the first Christian channel, was founded in 1961 by Baptist Pastor Pat Robertson. Its show, The 700 Club, is one of the oldest on the American television scene and was broadcast in 39 languages in 138 countries in 2016.

The 1960s and early 1970s saw television replace radio as the primary home entertainment medium and also saw a further rise in Evangelical Christianity, particularly through the international television and radio ministry of Billy Graham. Many well-known televangelists began during this period, most notably Oral Roberts, Jimmy Swaggart, Jim and Tammy Faye Bakker, Jerry Falwell, Jesse Duplantis and Pat Robertson. Most developed their own media networks, news exposure, and political influence. In the 21st century, some televised church services continue to attract large audiences. In the US, there are Joel Osteen, Joyce Meyer and T. D. Jakes. In Nigeria, there are Enoch Adeboye and Chris Oyakhilome. Trinity Broadcasting Network is the world's largest religious television network.

== Controversies and criticism ==
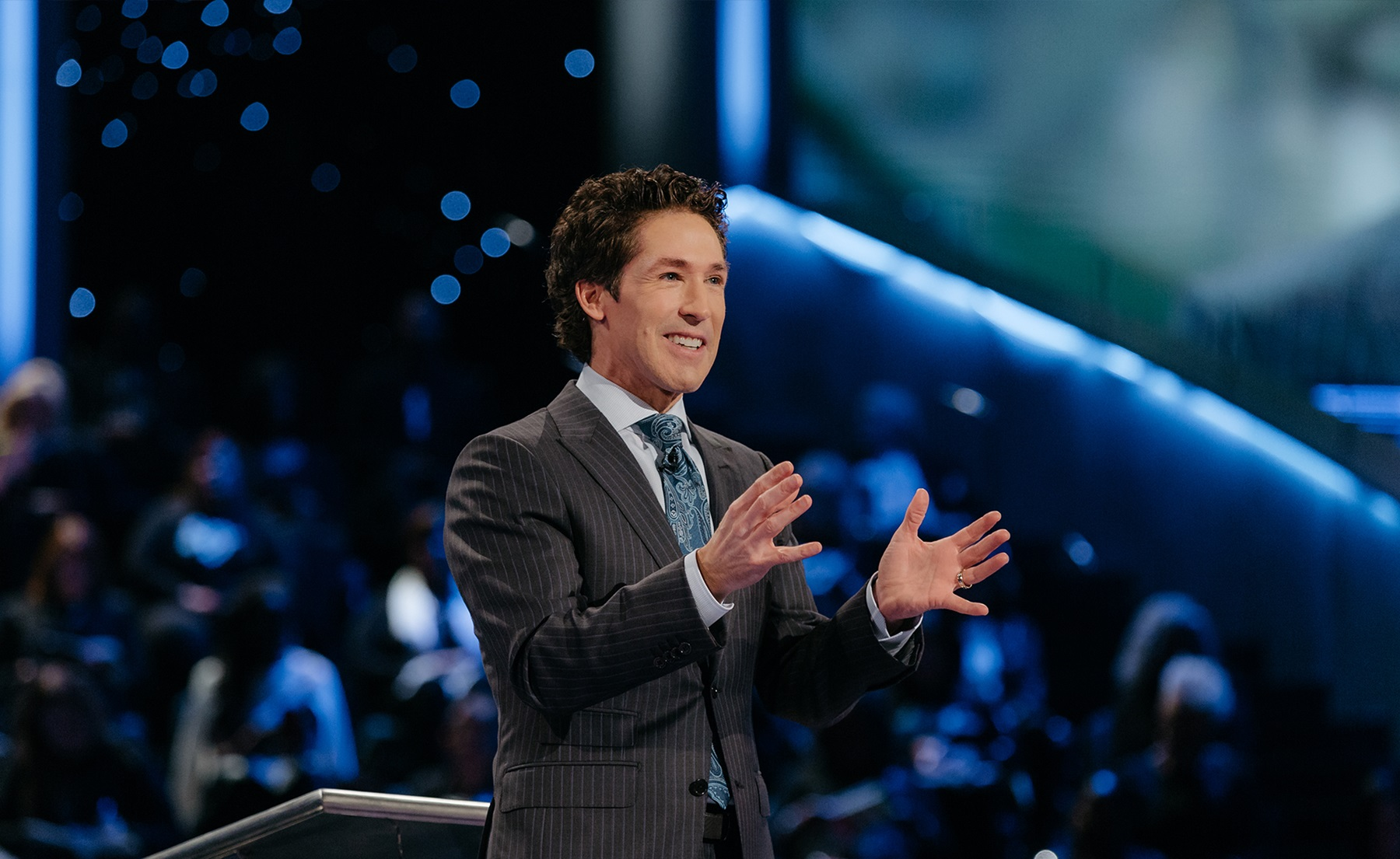
Televangelist Joel Osteen at Lakewood Church, a megachurch in Houston, Texas

Televangelists frequently draw criticism from other Christian ministers. For example, preacher John MacArthur published a number of articles in December 2009 that were highly critical of some televangelists.

Someone needs to say this plainly: The faith healers and health-and-wealth preachers who dominate religious television are shameless frauds. Their message is not the true Gospel of Jesus Christ. There is nothing spiritual or miraculous about their on-stage chicanery. It is all a devious ruse designed to take advantage of desperate people. They are not Godly ministers but greedy impostors who corrupt the Word of God for money's sake. They are not real pastors who shepherd the flock of God but hirelings whose only design is to fleece the sheep. Their love of money is glaringly obvious in what they say as well as how they live. They claim to possess great spiritual power, but in reality they are rank materialists and enemies of everything holy.

— John MacArthur

Similarly, Ole Anthony wrote very critically of televangelists in 1994.

A proportion of their methods and theology are held by some to be conflicting with Christian doctrine taught in long-existing traditionalist congregations. Many televangelists are featured by "discernment ministries" run by other Christians that are concerned about what they perceive as departures from sound Christian doctrine.

- Many televangelists exist outside the structures of Christian denominations, meaning that they are not accountable to anyone.
- The financial practices of many televangelists are unclear. A 2003 survey by the St. Louis Post-Dispatch indicated that only one out of the 17 televangelists researched were members of the Evangelical Council for Financial Accountability.
- The prosperity gospel taught by many televangelists promises material, financial, physical, and spiritual success to believers, which can run counter to several aspects of Christian teaching that warn of suffering for following Christ and recommend surrendering one's material possessions (see: Jesus and the rich young man).
- Some televangelists have significant personal wealth and own large properties, luxury cars, and various transportation vehicles such as private aircraft or ministry aircraft. This is seen by critics to be contradictory to traditional Christian thinking.
- Televangelism requires substantial amounts of money to produce programs and purchase airtime on cable and satellite networks, leading televangelists to devote time to fundraising activities. Products such as books, CDs, DVDs, and trinkets are promoted to viewers in an effort to raise funds.
- Televangelists claim to be reaching millions of people worldwide with the gospel and producing numerous converts to Christianity. However, such claims are difficult to verify independently and are often disputed.
- Several televangelists have been very active in national or international political arenas (e.g., Pat Robertson, Jerry Falwell, Jimmy Swaggart, John Hagee), and often espouse conservative politics on their programs. Such televangelists may occasionally arouse controversy by making remarks deemed offensive on their programs or elsewhere or by endorsing partisan political candidates on donor-paid airtime, which runs afoul of the Johnson Amendment's ban on tax-exempt organizations supporting or opposing candidates for political office.

=== Senate probe ===
In 2007, Senator Chuck Grassley opened a probe into the finances of six televangelists who preach a "prosperity gospel". The probe investigated reports of lavish lifestyles by televangelists including fleets of Rolls-Royces, palatial mansions, private jets, and other expensive items purportedly paid for by television viewers who donate due to the ministries' encouragement of offerings. The six that were investigated are:

- Kenneth and Gloria Copeland of Kenneth Copeland Ministries of Newark, Texas;
- Creflo Dollar and Taffi Dollar of World Changers Church International and Creflo Dollar Ministries of College Park, Georgia;
- Benny Hinn of World Healing Center Church Inc. and Benny Hinn Ministries of Grapevine, Texas;
- Eddie L. Long of New Birth Missionary Baptist Church and Bishop Eddie Long Ministries of Lithonia, Georgia (DocuSeries – Sex Scandals and Religion did a 2011 investigative episode on his alleged sexual misconduct);
- Joyce Meyer and David Meyer of Joyce Meyer Ministries of Fenton, Missouri;
- Randy White and ex-wife Paula White of the Without Walls International Church and Paula White Ministries of Tampa, Florida.

On January 6, 2011, Grassley released his review of the six ministries response to his inquiry. He called for a further congressional review of tax-exemption laws for religious groups.

== In Islam ==
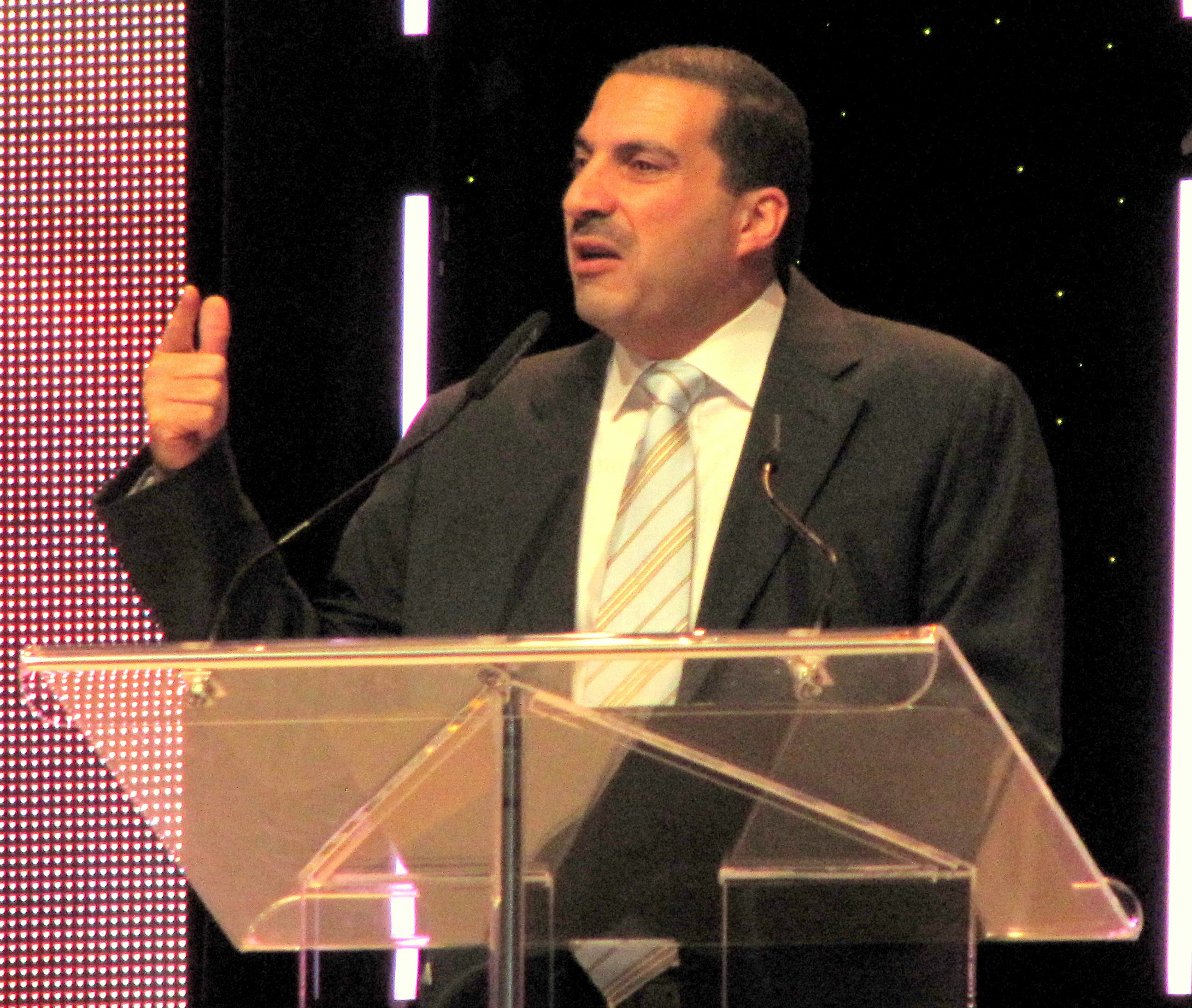
Amr Khaled, an influential Egyptian Muslim televangelist, in Toronto, Canada

In Islam, the related concept of dawah, which encourages Muslims to go and spread the religion to non-Muslims (similar to the evangelical tradition of evangelizing), has also given rise to figures often described as "Islamic televangelists" who preach using television and internet videos like their evangelical counterparts. Examples include Moez Masoud, Zakir Naik and Amr Khaled, amongst others. These figures may build on the longstanding da'i tradition but also draw inspiration from Christian televangelists. As with some Christian televangelists, some Islamic televangelists have been criticized for being too political, especially those pandering to fundamental Islamism including the far-right. Critics also claim that many will make significant amounts of money from their work and therefore may not be motivated by spiritual or charitable causes.

Examples of well-known Islamic televangelist TV channels include Muslim Television Ahmadiyya, Islam Channel, ARY Qtv and Peace TV. Some of these channels, but not all, have come under the scrutiny of national television or communications regulators such as Ofcom in the UK and the CRTC in Canada, with Ofcom having censured both Islam Channel and Peace TV in the past for biased coverage of political events, incitement to illegal acts including marital rape, homophobia, and murder. The Islamic televangelist channel Peace TV is banned in India, Bangladesh and Sri Lanka.

== See also ==
- List of television evangelists
- List of televangelists in Brazil
- McDonaldisation, Masala McGospel and Om Economics, study of televangelism in India
- National Religious Broadcasters
- New religious movement
- Our Lady of Perpetual Exemption
- Parodies of televangelism
- Prosperity theology
- Televangelist Peter Popoff exposed by James Randi
