= American football strategy =

Strategy plays a crucial role in American football. Both teams carefully plan various aspects of their gameplay in an effort to win. This includes deciding on formations, selecting players for specific positions, and assigning roles and instructions to each player on offense and defense.

Throughout the game, each team constantly adjusts their strategy, responding to the other's strengths and weaknesses. They experiment with different approaches to outmaneuver or overpower their opponent. On offense, a team's objective is to score through touchdowns and field goals, all while remaining vigilant of the opposing team's defensive strategy. On defense, the goal is to prevent the offense from scoring, as well as attempting to intercept the ball and shift momentum in their favor.

== Offensive strategy ==
The primary goal of the offense is to score points. To achieve this, coaches and players design and execute plays based on several factors: the players involved, the opponent's defensive strategy, the time remaining before halftime or the end of the game, and the number of points needed to secure a win. Offensively, teams can also aim to prolong possession of the ball to limit the opponent's scoring opportunities. Drives, or offensive scoring chances, come to an end when the team either scores, fails to move the ball 10 yards and must punt the ball or kick a field goal, or turns it over via fumble, interception, or failing to convert on fourth down.

=== Offensive players ===
On offense, there are three types of players: linemen, backs, and wide receivers. The positions and duties of these players can vary depending on the offensive scheme used by each team.

While position names and abbreviations may differ between team playbooks, the following are among the most commonly recognized:

==== Linemen ====
(These are understood to be players on the line other than the ends, also referred to as "interior linemen." The ends—i.e., players at the ends of the line—are discussed under "Receivers" below.)

- Center: The center ("C") snaps the ball to the quarterback. Like the other four linemen, their duties include both run blocking (pushing defenders away from the ball carrier during running plays) and pass blocking (preventing defenders from disrupting or sacking the quarterback). The center is also typically responsible for calling the blocking schemes, directing the other linemen on which defenders to block.
- Guard: Guards ("G") line up on either side of the center. They are generally larger than the center and are usually stronger at run blocking than pass blocking.
- Tackle: Tackles ("T") are positioned at the ends of the offensive line. They are often the largest linemen (at the NFL level, typically at least 300 pounds (140 kg) and sometimes as tall as 6 feet 9 inches (206 cm), but they must also have excellent hand and foot coordination to effectively protect against pass rushers. For teams with a right-handed quarterback, the left tackle is often the best pass blocker, as they are responsible for preventing a "blindside" pass rush the quarterback might not see. Right tackles carry the same responsibility for left-handed quarterbacks.

==== Backs ====
Backs are named for their position behind the line of scrimmage at the start of a play.

- Quarterback: The quarterback ("QB") lines up directly behind the center to receive the ball in an action called a "snap" and puts it into play. The quarterback's main role is to either pass (throw) the ball or hand it to a running back ("RB") who carries it downfield. In some situations, the quarterback may run the ball themself, either due to the play design or a lack of other options. Occasionally, the quarterback can also act as a receiver during a "trick play" by catching a pass from another player. The quarterback communicates the play to the team, both in the huddle before the snap and at the line of scrimmage. Quarterbacks must read defenses quickly and throw the ball accurately, making them the offensive leader and often considered the most important player on the field.
- Fullback: The fullback ("FB") lines up behind the quarterback and participates in running, blocking, and occasionally catching passes. In many offensive schemes, the fullback is classified as a running back but is generally larger and more physical, with a focus on blocking rather than running or receiving.
- Halfback: The halfback ("HB"), also known as the "tailback" ("TB") or more commonly a running back, lines up behind the quarterback and, often, the fullback. Sometimes, the halfback will line up directly behind the center to receive the snap (as seen in the wildcat formation). Their responsibilities include running the ball, catching passes, blocking, and occasionally passing the ball in trick plays.

==== Receivers ====
(Eligible receivers are the ends and the backs, excluding an NFL quarterback lined up "under center." Not all backs are classified as wide receivers.)

- Wide receiver: Depending on the formation, an offense may have anywhere from zero to five wide receivers (WR). Most basic formations feature either two or three WRs, who may line up on the line of scrimmage (in which case a WR in this position is sometimes called a split end) or behind the line of scrimmage (where they are referred to as flankers, wingbacks, or slotbacks). WRs are among the fastest and most agile players on the team, with their primary role being to catch passes and gain yards after the catch. Effective receivers are also good blockers and, in some cases, can function as running backs in trick plays.
- Tight end: The tight end (TE) was traditionally a blocking position but is now considered a combination wide receiver and lineman. TEs typically line up on the line of scrimmage next to the tackles. They are among the most versatile athletes on the field, needing to be strong enough to block both in running and passing plays, while also being agile enough to run pass routes and catch the football.

=== Offensive formations ===
Before the ball is snapped, the offensive team lines up in a formation. The type of formation used is determined by the game situation. Teams often employ "special formations" for specific scenarios, such as obvious passing situations, short yardage, or goal-line plays. Some formations are designed for a particular game to confuse the defense.

There are nearly unlimited possible formations, but a few of the more common ones include:

- Goal line formation
- I formation
- Option offense
- Pistol formation
- Pro set
- Shotgun formation
- Single set back
- Single-wing formation
- T formation
- Wildcat formation
- Wishbone formation
- Victory formation

=== Offensive plays ===
When the team is in formation and the quarterback gives a signal—either by calling out instructions or using a non-verbal cue known as a "silent count"—the center snaps the ball to the quarterback, and a play begins.

==== Running plays ====
A running play occurs when the quarterback hands the ball to another player, who then attempts to carry it past the line of scrimmage to gain yards. Alternatively, the quarterback may keep the ball and run beyond the line of scrimmage themself. In both scenarios, the offensive line's primary job is to run block, preventing defensive players from tackling the ball carrier.

The choice of running play depends on the offensive team’s strengths, the defensive weaknesses, and the distance required to score a touchdown or gain a first down. There are many types of running plays, including:

- Plunge/Dive
- Sweep
- Reverse
- Off Tackle
- Student Body Right
- Draw
- Counter Trey
- Quarterback sneak
- QB sweep
- Bootleg
- Option
- Counter
- Power
- Zone
- Trap run

==== Passing plays ====
When a passing play occurs, the backs and receivers run specific patterns, or routes, while the quarterback throws the ball to one of the players. During these plays, the offensive line's primary job is to prevent defensive players from tackling the quarterback before he throws the ball (a "sack") or disrupting the quarterback in any other way during the play.

Passing plays generally cover more ground than running plays, making them ideal for situations where the offensive team needs to gain a large number of yards. Even if a team does not need to gain a large number of yards, relying solely on running plays could make the offense predictable. Run plays are often used to tire out defensive linemen and to set up passing plays.

One way to set up a passing play is through a play-action pass. In this strategy, the quarterback and running back fake a run play while the receivers run routes. The goal is to deceive the defense into thinking it's a run play, allowing the receivers to get open for an easier completion. Successfully running the ball can also make play-action passes more effective, as the defense may be caught off guard, leading to bigger plays if the pass is completed.

Examples of routes

Different types of pass plays include:

- Fly route
- Slant route
- Out route
- Screen pass
- Button hook
- Corner Route
- Hail Mary
- Seam route

==== Eligible receivers ====
One general rule teams must consider when developing their passing strategy is that only certain players are allowed to catch forward passes. If a player who is not an eligible receiver receives a thrown pass, the team may be penalized. However, if a team reports to the referee before a play that a normally ineligible receiver will act as an eligible receiver for that play, that player is allowed to catch passes. Teams use this strategy occasionally to confuse the defense or force them to pay more attention to potential pass catchers.

=== Specific offensive strategies ===
Using a combination of passing and running plays, the offense aims to gain the yards needed for a first down, touchdown, or field goal. Over the years, several football coaches and offensive coordinators have developed well-known and widely used offensive strategies:

- Option offense
- Run and shoot offense
- Smashmouth offense
- Air Coryell
- Spread offense
- West Coast offense
- Pistol offense
- Pro-style offense
- Marty ball
- Air Raid offense

=== Play calling systems ===
Distinct from the offensive strategies or philosophies that govern how a team moves the ball down the field—whether through downfield passes, short passes, or inside runs—are the methods used for calling plays. These play calling systems often developed alongside certain offensive strategies, though they can be adapted to any strategy. The differences between these systems lie in the specific language used to communicate plays to players. In the NFL, three basic systems predominate:

- The West Coast system: Developed alongside the West Coast offense, this system uses specific words to describe formations, blocking schemes, and routes. A typical play name might be "FB West Right Slot 372 Y Stick." Here, "FB West Right Slot" describes the formation, "372" details the blocking scheme, and "Y Stick" indicates the route run by the primary receiver (Y receiver or tight end).
- The Coryell system: Associated with the Air Coryell offense, this system relies on a numerical code known as a "route tree." Play calling uses a three-digit number, such as 896, where each digit directs a specific receiver on their route: the leftmost receiver runs an "8" or post route, the middle receiver runs a "9" or go route, and the rightmost receiver runs a "6" or in route.
- The Erhardt–Perkins system: Developed in the 1970s by two assistant coaches with the New England Patriots, this system uses single-word concepts rather than assigning roles to each player. For instance, a word like "ghost" instructs each receiver on their actions. This system separates the concept from the formation, so regardless of the formation, each player runs the appropriate pattern based on the "ghost" concept. This method emphasizes memorization (as players need to know every route for every concept), allows for more efficient communication (one word replaces complex sentences of coded words and numbers), and offers greater flexibility by enabling every play to be run from any formation.

== Defensive strategy ==
The goal of defensive strategy is to prevent the opposing offense from gaining yards and scoring points. This can be achieved either by stopping the offense from advancing the ball beyond the line of scrimmage or by taking the ball away from the offense (referred to as a turnover) and scoring points themselves.

=== Defensive players ===
On defense, there are three types of players: linemen, linebackers, and defensive backs (also called secondary players). Their specific positions on the field and duties during the game vary depending on the type of defense being used and the kind of offense the defense is facing.

==== Defensive line ====
The defensive line lines up in front of the offensive line. The responsibility of the defensive lineman is to prevent the offensive line from opening up running lanes for the running back or to sack the quarterback, depending on whether the play is a passing or running play. Most of the time, defensive linemen attack the offensive line, but in some plays, they drop back into pass coverage to confuse the opposing team.

- Defensive nose guard: The nose guard ("NG"), also known as a nose tackle ("NT"), lines up across from the center. Nose guards are among the biggest players on the field and primarily work to push back the center or the guard to stop a running play or to move the offensive linemen to where the linebackers can rush the quarterback.
- Defensive tackle: The defensive tackle ("DT") lines up against the guard or center on the offensive line. Defensive tackles are generally the biggest and most powerful players on defense; many of them are of a similar size to the offensive line. They tend to be more focused on "run-stopping" rather than rushing the quarterback themselves.
- Defensive end: Defensive ends ("DE") line up just outside the offensive tackle. Defensive ends need to be strong enough to withstand pushes from the offensive line, yet fast enough to move around the offensive tackle. There are different types of defensive ends: some are as strong as DTs and are considered more adept at stopping the run, while others are faster and more agile, making them better at rushing the quarterback than stopping the run.

==== Linebackers ====
Linebackers stand behind the defensive linemen or set themselves up on the line of scrimmage. Depending on the defensive strategy being used, a linebacker’s responsibilities can include helping to stop the run, rushing the quarterback, or dropping back in pass protection.

- Outside linebackers: The outside linebackers ("OLB") set up on the outside portion of the line of scrimmage. They are often used to rush the quarterback and tend to be the fastest and most agile linebackers on the defense.
- Inside linebackers: Inside linebackers ("ILB"), sometimes also referred to as middle linebackers ("MLB"), set up on the inside portion of the line of scrimmage. ILBs tend to be the biggest and strongest linebackers on the defense.

==== Defensive backs ====
Defensive backs stand behind the linebackers. Their primary responsibility is pass coverage, although they can also be involved in stopping the run or rushing the quarterback.

- Cornerback: The cornerback ("CB") lines up opposite the opposing offense's wide receiver(s). Their main job is to cover wide receivers, preventing them from catching passes or tackling them if they do.
- Safety: Safeties ("S") are usually the farthest from the line of scrimmage when the play starts. Their role is to help the cornerbacks cover receivers and, if necessary, assist the defensive line and linebackers in defending against the run. Because of this "do everything" role, safeties are typically the best all-around athletes on the defense. Safeties are designated as strong safeties ("SS") or free safeties ("FS"). The strong safety usually plays closer to the line, matches up against tight ends, and is more involved in stopping the run. The free safety, on the other hand, typically plays farther from the line and acts as the "last line of defense" in both the pass and run game.

=== Defensive formations ===
In special situations, extra defensive backs enter in "nickel" (pictured) or "dime" packages to cover additional receivers.

The most common way to describe a basic defensive formation is by stating the number of linemen followed by the number of linebackers. The number of defensive backs is usually not mentioned, though if it is (such as in the "3–3–5"), the number typically appears after the linebackers. Thus, the formula would be (# of linemen)–(# of linebackers)–(# of defensive backs [if stated]) in these situations. This naming rule does not always apply when the personnel for a certain formation are lined up in a way that changes the function of the players in the defense. For example, the "3–5–3" actually uses the 3–3–5 personnel but arranges the five defensive backs with "3 deep," thus grouping the other two defensive backs with the linebackers.

By far the most common alignments are four down linemen and three linebackers (a "4–3" defense) or three down linemen and four linebackers ("3–4"), but other formations such as five linemen and two linebackers ("5–2") or three linemen, three linebackers, and five defensive backs ("3–3–5") are also used by a number of teams.

On plays where the defense expects the offense to pass, emphasis is often placed on the number of defensive backs. In a basic 4–3 or 3–4 defense, there are four defensive backs on the field (2 cornerbacks [CB], 1 strong safety [SS], and 1 free safety [FS]). When one of the linemen or linebackers is removed and an additional defensive back is added, common alignments for these five defensive back packages include the "nickel" package, which has 3 CB, 1 SS, and 1 FS, and the "3–3–5," a nickel package variant that includes either 2 CB, 2 SS, and 1 FS, or 3 CB, 1 SS, and 1 FS like the standard nickel package. When a sixth defensive back is inserted, it is known as a "dime" package (4 CB, 1 SS, 1 FS). In rare instances when a seventh defensive back is inserted, it is known as a "quarter" package (5 CB, 1 SS, 1 FS or 4 CB, 2 SS, 1 FS). As with offensive formations, there are many combinations that can be used to set up a defense. Unusual defensive alignments are constantly used in an effort to neutralize a given offense's strengths. For example, in Super Bowl XXV, the New York Giants used a formation with two down linemen, four linebackers, and five defensive backs, a strategy that prevented their opponents, the Buffalo Bills, from completing long passes. In a 2004 game, the New England Patriots used no down linemen and seven linebackers for two plays against the Miami Dolphins.

Some of the more familiar defensive formations include:

- 4–3
- 3–4
- 5–2
- 4–4
- 3–3–5
- 46 defense
- Nickel
- Dime
- Quarter or Prevent
- Eight-in-the-box defense

=== Defensive plays ===
The defense must wait until the ball is snapped by the opposing center before moving across the line of scrimmage or otherwise engaging any of the offensive players. Once the opposing offense has broken their huddle and lined up in their formation, defensive players often call out instructions to each other to make last-second adjustments to the defense.

==== Run defense ====
To prevent the opposing offense from gaining yards on the ground, a defense might focus more on their run defense. This typically involves placing more players close to the line of scrimmage to reach the ball carrier more quickly. This strategy is often used when the opposing offense needs to gain only a few yards to achieve a first down or score a touchdown.

==== Pass defense ====
When the defense anticipates that the opposing offense will pass the ball, they shift into pass defense. There are two general schemes for defending against the pass:

- Man-to-man: Each eligible receiver is covered by a defensive back or a linebacker.
- Zone: Certain players (usually defensive backs or linebackers, though occasionally linemen as well) are assigned an area on the field to cover.

==== Blitz ====
There are times when a defense believes that the best way to stop the offense is to rush the quarterback. This involves sending five or more players charging at the line of scrimmage in an attempt to tackle the quarterback before he can throw the ball or hand it off. Any player on the defense is allowed to rush the quarterback, and many schemes have been developed over the years that involve complicated or unusual blitz "packages".

=== Specific defensive strategies ===
Defensive strategies differ somewhat from offensive strategies in that, unlike offenses which have very specific, detailed plans and assignments for each player, defenses are more reactive. Each player's general goal is to "stop the offense" by tackling the ball carrier, breaking up passing plays, taking the ball away from the offense, or sacking the quarterback. While precision and timing are critical to offensive strategy, defensive strategies often emphasize aggressiveness and the ability to react to plays as they develop.

Nevertheless, many defensive strategies have been developed over the years that coaches use as a framework for their general defense, making specific adjustments based on their players' capabilities and the opponent they are facing.

Some of the most commonly known and used defensive strategies include:

- Man-to-man
- Coverage shells (cover 2, cover 3, etc.)
- Zone blitz
- Blitz
- Tampa 2
- 46 defense
- 5–5–1 Two-level defense

== Special teams strategy ==
The special teams unit is a group of players who take the field during kickoffs, free kicks, punts, and field goal attempts. Most football teams' special teams include one or more kickers, a long snapper (who specializes in accurate snaps over long distances), kick returners who catch and carry the ball after it is kicked by the opposing team, and blockers who defend during kicks and returns.

Most special teams are composed of players who act as backups or substitutes on the team's offensive and defensive units. Due to the risk of injury, it is uncommon for a starting offensive or defensive player to also play on a special teams unit.

A variety of strategic plays can be attempted during kickoffs, punts, and field goals to surprise the opposition and score points, gain yardage or first downs, or recover possession of the kicked ball.

=== Kickoffs ===
A kickoff occurs at the beginning of each half, overtime period (not in college), and following each touchdown, successful field goal, or safety. Strategically, the coach of the kicking team may choose to execute the kickoff in one of several ways:

- Standard kickoff: The kicker attempts a high kick meant to travel the greatest possible distance upfield. The kicking team's primary goal is to stop the opposing team's returner as close as possible to the end zone, thus forcing that team to advance the ball a longer distance to score.
- Onside kick: This is a very short kick aimed at allowing the kicking team to recover possession after kicking the ball ten or more yards. It is usually attempted in the closing minutes of a game when a team needs to score quickly to have a chance of winning.
- "Squib kick" or "pooch kick": The squib kick is a low kick that may hit the ground and bounce unpredictably, making it less predictable. A squib kick is generally used to avoid a long return, although this outcome is not guaranteed. A pooch kick is a similar strategy but involves a short, high kick that the kickoff team can reach before there is a return. Because the kick does not travel as far as a standard kickoff, this strategy provides the opposing team with better average field position but reduces the likelihood of a long kick return.
- Kickoff out of bounds: If a kickoff travels over the sidelines either in the air or bounces in the field of play and then rolls out of bounds without being touched by a player on the receiving team, the play results in an illegal procedure penalty. The ball is then spotted 30 yards from the spot of the kick or at the out-of-bounds location, resulting in a first down (and beginning of offensive series) for the receiving team. Sometimes, although rarely, the kicking team may purposely kick the ball out of bounds to avoid facing an excellent kick returner.

=== Punts ===
- Standard punts: These occur on fourth down when the chances of gaining enough yards for a first down are slim and the ball is too far from the goalpost for a field goal attempt. Generally, a member of the opposing team moves into position to catch the ball and may attempt to gain yards by running it downfield or signal a fair catch by waving one arm above his head, indicating he will not attempt to return the ball. A player who has signaled a fair catch may not be tackled after catching the ball, or the player who tackles him will be penalised for kick-catching interference.
- Pooch punts: Occasionally, a coach may line up the team in a shotgun formation and have the quarterback "quick kick" or "pooch punt," using the element of surprise to catch the defense off guard. Some teams even execute this from a field goal formation, having the ball snapped directly to the placekicker, who punts the ball downfield instead of attempting a field goal with a low chance of success.
- Fake punts: Similar to a fake field goal, a fake punt aims to deceive the opposition, either to score or gain enough yards for a first down. Fake punts are risky for the same reasons as fake field goals and are thus rarely attempted.
- Punts out of bounds: Skilled punters may try to punt the ball so that it touches the field in bounds and then rolls out of bounds close to the opposing team's end zone. The drawback is that the ball may roll into the end zone (touchback), giving the receiving team normal starting position. If the kick is angled too sharply, it may go out of bounds too early, resulting in a short or botched punt. The best punters are highly regarded for their ability to place the ball out of bounds within five yards of the goal line. These punts are also known as a "coffin corner punt" for their ability to pin the opposing offense inside its own five-yard line, increasing the chances of scoring a safety or a defensive touchdown.
- Onside punts: In some leagues, onside punting is legal. As of 2017, the Canadian Football League is the only professional league to allow it. The XFL permitted onside punting if the ball traveled 25 yards or more. This tactic can be used as a surprise or to cover distances that a regular play might not.
- Field goal attempts: In high school football, a field goal attempt is considered a regular punt if the attempt is unsuccessful. Thus, kicking from a field goal formation may provide an opportunity for a punt without the opposing team having a return man.

The "no punting" strategy forgoes punting altogether and instead attempts to convert on as many fourth downs as possible. This strategy has been implemented at Pulaski Academy, a top-ranked prep school, and has been advocated by Gregg Easterbrook in his Tuesday Morning Quarterback column and author Jon Wertheim. Fourth down decisions to punt have been analysed mathematically by David Romer.

=== Field goals ===
Field goals are worth one point after a scored touchdown or three points if a team opts for a field goal attempt without scoring a touchdown but is within a suitable range for the kicker.

- Standard field goals: The strategy for a field goal is fairly straightforward. The offensive team forms a protective semicircle behind the line of scrimmage on either side of the center, who snaps the ball to the holder. The holder positions the ball so the kicker, from a short distance away, can quickly get into position and accurately kick the ball through the goalposts. The remaining players block the opposing team, which tries to break through the protective circle to block the kick or deflect it to intercept the ball. If the field goal is missed, the opposing team takes possession of the ball from the spot where the kick was made, rather than from the line of scrimmage. Several factors, including distance, weather, crowd noise, and a kicker's leg strength and experience, influence the success or failure of a field goal attempt.
- Fake field goals: In certain situations, a coach may choose to have the team fake a field goal attempt. The players line up as usual, but instead of holding the ball for a kick, the player receiving the snap may run with the ball, hand it off to another player, or attempt a pass downfield.
- Field goal returns: The defensive team can return a missed field goal if the attempt falls short of the goalposts. A player may return the ball similarly to a punt. Teams usually attempt a return only on very long field goals at the end of the first half or in the closing seconds of a tied game. In other cases, it is often more advantageous for the defense to let the ball fall short rather than attempt a return.

=== Kick and punt returns ===
- Standard returns: The primary decision for a kick returner is whether to attempt a return. Typically, if a returner catches a kickoff or punt in the "red zone" (between the receiving team's own end zone and the 20-yard line), they will try to advance the ball, even if only to gain a few yards. If the receiving team's players position themselves effectively, they may help the returner gain additional yardage or even score a touchdown.
- Laterals: In critical situations—such as during kickoff returns in the final seconds—the returner may attempt a lateral pass to prevent the ball from being downed by a tackle. The return team can throw as many lateral passes as needed in a desperate bid to keep the ball in play. A notable example of this occurred on January 8, 2000, during a wildcard game between the Tennessee Titans and Buffalo Bills. In the final moments, Lorenzo Neal, Frank Wycheck, and Kevin Dyson executed a 75-yard kickoff return touchdown, known as the Music City Miracle, giving the Titans a 22–16 lead and advancing them to the second round of the playoffs. Another famous instance is The Play, where the University of California's return team completed five lateral passes for a successful return and a dramatic victory over Stanford.
- Fair catches: A kick returner may signal a fair catch if they are positioned well or if the kicking team's players are advancing too quickly for a return. If a returner signals for a fair catch but then attempts a return, they are penalised. Similarly, players who tackle a returner who has signalled for a fair catch are penalised. If a player signals for a fair catch but fails to catch the ball, the ball is downed as normal by the kicking team, but if recovered by the receiving team, it cannot be advanced. If a receiving player catches the ball and then drops it, it becomes a live ball and can be recovered by either team.
- "Live balls" and "Dead balls": If a punted ball is touched by a member of the receiving team after passing the line of scrimmage, even accidentally, it becomes a live ball and can be recovered as a fumble by the kicking team. Conversely, if the receiving team does not touch the ball and a member of the kicking team touches it, the ball is ruled dead where it is touched. All place-kicked balls—kickoffs, field goal attempts, and the like—are considered live balls and may be played by either team, subject to specific rules for "free" kicks, such as the onside kick.

==== Downing the ball ====
If the receiving team does not catch the ball, the kicking team may try to down it as close as possible to the opposing team's end zone. This can be achieved by either catching the ball (typically when close to the end zone to prevent a touchback) or by surrounding the ball and allowing it to roll or bounce as close as possible to the end zone without touching it. If the ball appears to be rolling or bouncing into the end zone, a player may run in front of the goal line to attempt to bat it down or catch it. If a member of the kicking team catches the ball before a member of the receiving team does, the play is blown dead by the official, and the receiving team takes possession at the spot where the ball was touched by the kicking team.

Therefore, it is strategically important for kicking teams to get as close to the ball as possible after a punt so they can quickly tackle a returner, down the ball as near to the opposing team's end zone as possible, and, if feasible, recover the ball after a fumble to regain possession.

== See also ==
- Advanced Football Analytics
- American football
- Bump and run coverage
- American football glossary
- Formation (American football)
- Sports strategy
