= Pro-style offense =

NFL-style American football offensive scheme

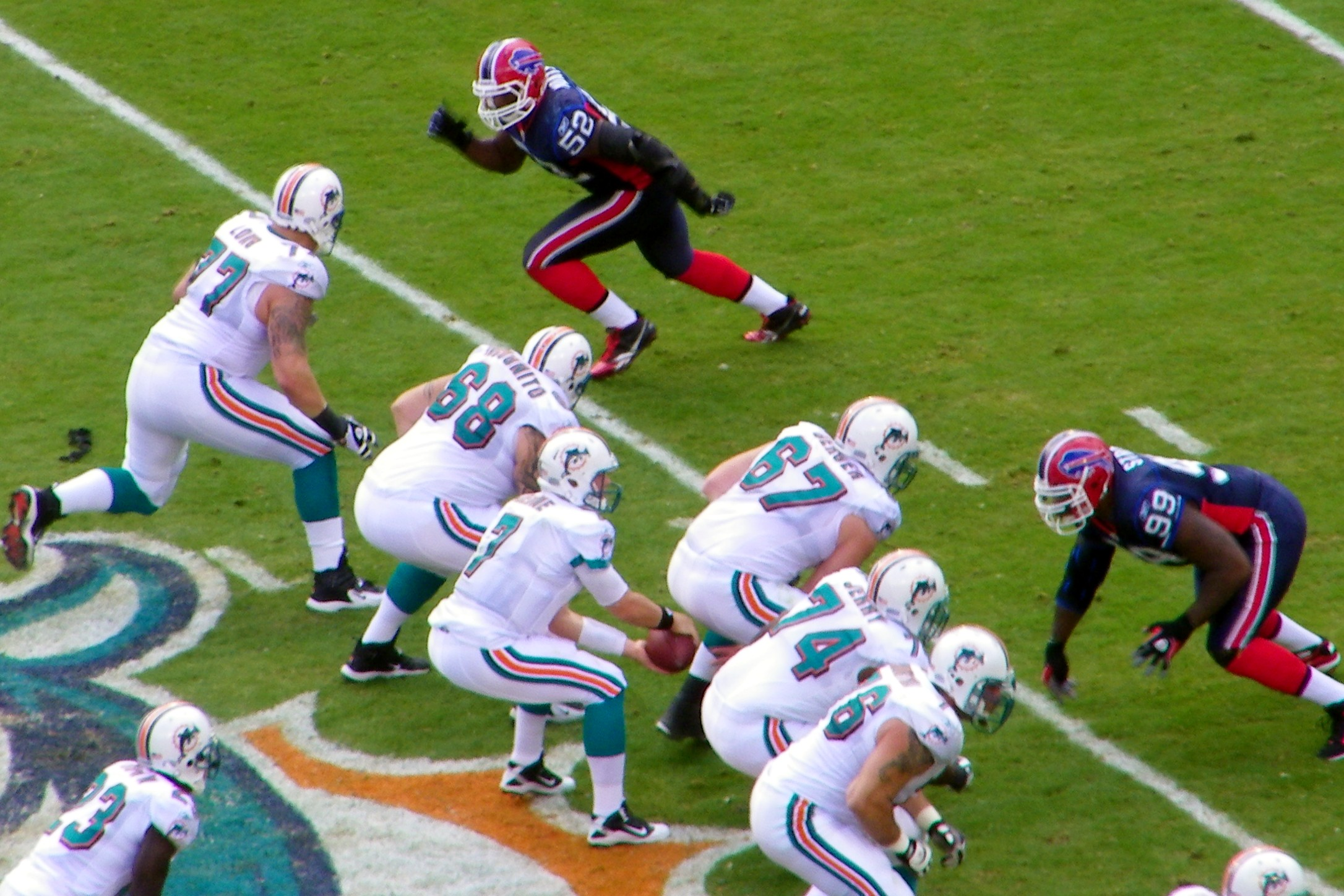
Pro football

A pro-style offense in American football is any offensive scheme that resembles those predominantly used at the professional level of play in the National Football League (NFL), in contrast to those typically used at the collegiate or high school level. Pro-style offenses are fairly common at top-quality colleges but much less used at the high school level. The term should not be confused with a pro set, which is a specific formation that is used by some offenses at the professional level.

Generally, pro-style offenses are more complex than typical college or high school offenses. They are balanced, requiring offensive lines that are adept at both pass and run blocking, quarterbacks (QBs) with good decision-making abilities, and running backs (RBs) who are capable of running between the tackles. Offenses that fall under the pro-style category include the West Coast offense, the Air Coryell offense, and the Erhardt-Perkins offensive system.

Often, pro style offenses use certain formations much more commonly than the air raid, run and shoot, flexbone, spread, pistol, or option offenses. Pro-style offenses typically use the fullback (FB) and TEs much more commonly than offenses used at the collegiate or high school levels.

Part of the complexity of the offense is that teams at the professional level often employ multiple formations and are willing to use them at any point during an actual game. One example might be that a team uses a Strong I formation run (FB lined up where the TE is located on the line of scrimmage) on 1st Down followed up by a running play out of the Ace formation on second down before attempting a pass on 3rd down out of a two-WR shotgun formation.

Another aspect of the complexity is that the running game is primarily built on zone blocking or involves a power run scheme. Both of these require an offensive line that is very athletic, one play they could be trying to zone block a linebacker, and the following one could be power blocking a defensive line. Most of the blocking schemes involve a series of rules, or a system in which they operate their blocks. The passing game as a result often employs play-action, often with the QB dropping back from under center, as a means of passing the ball while building on the running game.

Coaches who make the transition from the NFL to the NCAA as head coaches often bring with them their pro-style offenses. Such examples include Charlie Weis (former HC at Kansas and Notre Dame), Dave Wannstedt (former HC at Pittsburgh), Bill O'Brien (HC at Boston College, former HC at Penn State). One positive aspect of employing a pro-style offense is that it can help players make transitions from the college level to the professional level quicker as a result of their familiarity with the system's complexity.

== Typical pro-style formations ==
- Single set back formation: Is probably the most prominent Pro-Style offensive formation, often being referred to as an Ace formation. It typically involves 1 running back in the backfield with a Tight End lined up on the line of scrimmage with 3 receivers out wide. There are variations of the formation where a secondary Tight End or a flanked full back can replace one of the Receivers.
- I formation: Another standard formation with 2 WRs on the outside and a RB lined up behind a FB and the QB who is under center. Tweaks including shifting the FB to the left or right side behind the guard.
- Shotgun formation: One difference is that often the shotgun is used as a three-WR formation with a TE lined up inside to help block in pass protection. RBs can also line up next to the QB to help pick up blitzes.

== NFL teams that used the pro-style offense ==
Start	End	Team	Head coach	Offensive coordinator
1984	1984	Minnesota Vikings	Les Steckel	Jerry Burns
1997	1999	Tennessee Oilers/Titans	Jeff Fisher	Les Steckel
2000	2001	Tampa Bay Buccaneers	Tony Dungy	Les Steckel
2001	—	Minnesota Vikings	Dennis Green	Sherman Lewis
2001	2005	Minnesota Vikings	Mike Tice	Sherman Lewis and Scott Linehan
2011	2013	Tennessee Titans	Mike Munchak	Chris Palmer and Dowell Loggains
2012	2012	Chicago Bears	Lovie Smith	Mike Tice
2012	2013	Tampa Bay Buccaneers	Greg Schiano	Mike Sullivan
