= Multiple offense =

American football scheme

The multiple offensive is an American football offensive scheme used by several teams in the National Football League and college football. It is a hybrid offense consisting of formations and plays from various other schemes including the pro-style offense, spread offense, and pistol offense.

The multiple offense allows for a wide variety of play calls and formations, from spreading the field with 4 or 5 wide receivers to utilizing fullbacks and tight ends to establish a power running game. As such, it can be adjusted to fit the skills of available offensive personnel and can be difficult for an opposing defense to scout and prepare for. On the other hand, it can result in an offense which is "mediocre at everything", especially in college football, where practice time is limited.
