= Air Coryell =

American football offense focused on setting up deep passing

In American football, Air Coryell is the offensive scheme and philosophy developed by former San Diego Chargers and San Diego State Aztecs coach Don Coryell. The offensive philosophy has been also called the "Coryell offense" or the "vertical offense".

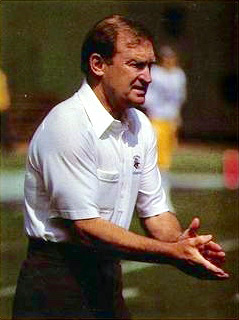
Don Coryell, who developed the scheme

With Dan Fouts as quarterback, the San Diego Chargers' offense was among the greatest passing offenses in National Football League history. The Chargers led the league in passing yards an NFL record six consecutive years from 1978 to 1983 and again in 1985. They also led the league in total yards in offense from 1978 to 1983 and in 1985. Coryell, Fouts, Charlie Joiner, and Kellen Winslow are all inducted into the Pro Football Hall of Fame from those Charger teams.

== Pre-Coryell NFL ==
Before Coryell, NFL teams generally used the pro set formation in ball-control, grind-it-out-style offenses that used play-action fakes to set up deep passing attempts when defenses stacked up vs the running game. The pro set features a tight end, two wide receivers, a halfback, and a fullback, often split behind the quarterback. On pass plays, the pro set provided one or even two backs to help protect the quarterback. QBs generally took snaps from under center to allow for more effective use of the play action pass.

In 1978, the contact from defenders on receivers was minimized with the passing of the Mel Blount Rule, which prohibited defenders from making contact with receivers past five yards from the line of scrimmage.

== Coryell opens up passing in the NFL ==
Coryell began his NFL career in 1973 following 12 seasons as the head coach of the San Diego State Aztecs, and soon set the league on its ear with his passing schemes. He won two consecutive division titles (1974–1975) with the St. Louis Cardinals, whose offense emphasized the pass while running the standard pro set. Coryell moved to the Chargers, returning to the same home field he had made a name for himself at the college ranks (San Diego Stadium), and reached the playoffs in four consecutive seasons that included three straight division titles (1979–1981). The Chargers in 1979 were the first AFC Western Division champion to run more passing plays (541) than rushing (481). Coryell's Chargers teams led the league in passing in seven of eight years. The Pro Football Hall of Fame called the Chargers' offenses under Coryell "one of the most explosive and exciting offenses that ever set foot on an NFL field." Coryell was the first coach to win more than 100 games at both the collegiate and professional level. Coryell's offensive innovations changed the entire nature of the league from a run-first league to a pass-first one.

As of 2022, most NFL offenses' passing games are based at least partially on Coryell conventions.

Mike Martz, who ran The Greatest Show on Turf with the St. Louis Rams, said, "Don is the father of the modern passing game. People talk about the West Coast offense, but Don started the 'West Coast' decades ago and kept updating it. You look around the NFL now, and so many teams are running a version of the Coryell offense. Coaches have added their own touches, but it's still Coryell's offense. He has disciples all over the league. He changed the game".

== Attributes of Air Coryell ==
The Coryell offense is based on Sid Gillman's offense, which required the defense to defend the entire field. The passing game was based on timing and rhythm, and coaching the system required a lot of repetition. Coryell expanded on those principles by putting receivers in motion. With the new defensive rules limiting contact to near the line of scrimmage, receivers in motion would be virtually impossible to jam. Coryell not only placed wide receivers in motion, he did so with tight ends and running backs as well. Putting the players in motion also had the advantage of allowing the quarterback to determine pre-snap if the defense would be playing zone or man-to-man defense. It was easier to read the coverage before the snap than afterwards due to the pass rush. It is also harder for a defender to cover if he has to change direction with the receiver instead of squaring up and getting set before a play. Defenses that react to the motion could get confused, leaving a defender in the wrong position.

The offense did not have any set formations, as receivers could line up anywhere on any given pass play. Passes were thrown to a spot before the receiver even got there, allowing defenders no hint where the pass was being targeted. Each receiver had two or three different route options they could adjust depending on the coverage during the play. Throwing a deep pass was the first option on each play. Coryell's offense had more progressions than Gillman's, with backup options for screen passes and underneath routes.

The Coryell offense is a combination of deep and mid range passing and power running. The offense relies on getting all five receivers out into patterns that combined stretched the field, setting up defensive backs with route technique, and the quarterback throwing to a spot on time where the receiver can catch and turn upfield. Pass protection is critical to success because at least two of the five receivers will run a deep in, skinny post, comeback, speed out, or shallow cross.

Overall, the goal of the Coryell offense is to have at least two downfield, fast wide receivers who adjust to the deep pass very well, combined with a sturdy pocket quarterback with a strong arm. The Coryell offense uses three key weapons. The first is a strong inside running game, the second is its ability to strike deep with two or more receivers on any play, and the third is to not only use those two attacks in cooperation with each other, but to include a great deal of mid-range passing to a TE, WR, or back.

The Coryell offense introduced the concept of a tight end that ran wide receiver-type routes with Kellen Winslow in 1980. Tight ends previously were primarily blockers lined up next to an offensive lineman and ran short to medium drag routes. Winslow was put in motion so he would not be jammed at the line, or he was lined up wide or in the slot against a smaller cornerback. Former Chargers assistant coach Al Saunders said Winslow was "a wide receiver in an offensive lineman's body." Back then, defenses would cover Winslow with a strong safety or a linebacker, as zone defenses were not as popular. Strong safeties in those times were almost like another linebacker, a run defender who could not cover a tight end as fast as Winslow. Providing another defender to help the strong safety opened up other holes. Head coach Jon Gruden called Winslow the first "joker" in the NFL. He could line up unpredictably in any formation from a three-point stance as a blocker to a two-point stance or being in motion as a receiver.

After the Chargers in 1980 acquired running back Chuck Muncie, the offense started using a single set back featuring Muncie as the lone running back and adding a second tight end into the game. When defenses countered with extra defensive backs, the offense would run the ball. Joe Gibbs, the Chargers offensive coordinator at the time, said that marked "the evolution of the one-back offense."

Gibbs served as head coach of the Washington Redskins from 1981 to 1992, and during that time, he won three Super Bowls with a Coryell offense. His offense featured a smash mouth running game with 3 different running backs, Hall of Famer John Riggins, George Rogers and Earnest Byner, behind a massive offensive line known as the "Hogs." Gibbs's offense also showcased a 3-receiver deep air attack featuring Hall of Famer Art Monk, Gary Clark and Ricky Sanders, known as "The Posse". Gibbs usually kept the tight end in as an extra blocker, especially to neutralize pass rushing specialist and Hall of Fame linebacker Lawrence Taylor of the New York Giants.

Gibbs, who was inducted into the Pro Football Hall of Fame for his success as Redskins head coach, is also the first head coach in NFL history to win three Super Bowls with three different quarterbacks: Joe Theismann, Doug Williams, and Mark Rypien. Gibbs also coached the Redskins from 2004 to 2007, but was unable to duplicate the success he enjoyed during his first term in Washington.

Norv Turner, a former Washington Redskins and San Diego Chargers head coach, and offensive coordinator for many NFL teams (most notably for the Dallas Cowboys during the early 1990s), also implemented a version of the Coryell style of offense. The Turner version of Coryell offenses relied on a good receiving TE. Turner's systems sometimes featured an 'F-Back' (formerly known as an 'H-Back' in the 1980s), a hybrid tight end/wide receiver/fullback/running back. An F-Back is a multi-purpose, unpredictable tool for the offense. On any play he might carry the ball, lead block or pass block, play as a wide receiver, or run a tight end route. He is also part decoy, as his unpredictable role forces defenses to keep an eye on him, thereby opening up other opportunities for the offense.

== History of the name ==
Originally, it was known as the West Coast offense until an article about San Francisco 49ers head coach Bill Walsh in Sports Illustrated in the early 80s incorrectly called Walsh's offense "the West Coast offense", and this mis-labelling stuck. Subsequently, Coryell's offense scheme was referred to as "Air Coryell"—the name announcers had assigned to his high powered Charger offenses in San Diego, featuring 3 Hall of Famers in QB Dan Fouts, WR Charlie Joiner, & TE Kellen Winslow, as well as Pro Bowl WR Wes Chandler & HB Chuck Muncie. Today it is also known as the "Coryell offense", although the "vertical offense" is another accepted name.

== Disciples of Air Coryell ==
In NFL coaching circles, the most famous and successful advocates of the Air Coryell system are Norv Turner, Mike Martz and Al Saunders.

=== Norv Turner's version ===
Norv Turner first learned the offense from longtime Coryell assistant Ernie Zampese. As offensive coordinator with the Dallas Cowboys, Turner ran Coryell's offense with a greater emphasis on sideline throws than the Chargers used. Turner's take on the Coryell system turned around the career of Hall of Fame QB Troy Aikman, and has also proven to be very successful with talented high draft picks struggling with the complexities of the NFL, such as Alex Smith. Turner's variant is a quarterback-friendly scheme that favors taking controlled chances, like quicker midrange post passes to WRs off play action rather than slower developing passes that leave QBs exposed. It is almost exclusively run out of the pro set. Turner favors a more limited palette of plays than Coryell and most other Coryell disciples, instead insisting on precise execution. His offenses tend to include a strong offensive line, a strong running game, a #1 WR who can stretch the field and catch jump balls in the end-zone, a good receiving TE to attack the space the WRs create in the middle of the field and a FB who fills the role of a lead blocker and a final option as an outlet receiver. In Dallas, Turner helped make RB Emmitt Smith & WR Michael Irvin Hall of Famers, and TE Jay Novacek a five time Pro Bowler.

As offensive coordinator of the Cowboys under head coach Jimmy Johnson, Norv Turner enjoyed great success, piloting Dallas to back-to-back Super Bowl titles in 1992 and 1993. His record as a head coach, however, has only seen limited results. Turner first served as head coach of the Washington Redskins from 1994 to 2000, but the team only made the playoffs once, in 1999. He also served as head coach of the Oakland Raiders from 2004 to 2005, but endured 2 more losing seasons. Turner did, however, enjoy a good amount of success as San Diego Chargers head coach from 2007 to 2012. During his time with the Chargers, Turner's system helped quarterback Philip Rivers set new franchise records for single-season quarterback rating and touchdown passes in 2008. Besides Rivers, the Chargers featured a strong running game, starring Hall of Fame RB LaDainian Tomlinson. Turner's offense also had a potent passing game, which featured Hall of Fame TE Antonio Gates. San Diego won 3 straight AFC West division titles, from 2007 to 2009. However, despite having one of the NFL's most talented rosters, Turner was never able to guide the Chargers to the Super Bowl. Norv Turner also owns the rather dubious distinction of having the most career wins of any NFL head coach with a career losing record, compiling an overall record of 118–126–1 (.484), regular season and playoff games combined.

=== Mike Martz's version ===
The Mike Martz variant was a much more aggressive passing offense, frequently deploying pre-snap motion and shifts, with the running game often forgotten. There is much less of a focus on play action. The Martz variant favored an elusive feature back who can catch the ball, such as Hall of Famer Marshall Faulk, over the power runners the Turner scheme prefers. Martz credited both his influences on his variation of the offensive system and his overall coaching philosophy to Don Coryell. Martz first learned the Air Coryell offense as an assistant coach working under his mentor, Ernie Zampese. Martz continued learning the offense in the mid-90s as the quarterbacks coach of the Washington Redskins, working under the tutelage of head coach Norv Turner.

In 1999, Martz, then serving as offensive coordinator for Hall of Fame head coach Dick Vermeil, helped pilot the St. Louis Rams to victory in Super Bowl XXXIV. The Rams' offense, which was also known as "The Greatest Show on Turf", featured Hall of Fame QB Kurt Warner, who was the NFL MVP for the 1999 season (Warner earned another NFL MVP award in 2001). RB Marshall Faulk also played a prominent role in the St. Louis offense that season. Faulk won the NFL MVP award in 2000, and he would also win 3 straight AP NFL Offensive of the Year awards from 1999 to 2001. Additionally, St. Louis's offensive line was strong, anchored by multiple-time Pro Bowler and fellow Hall of Famer Orlando Pace. Lastly, the Rams' receiving core was impressive, featuring 4 strong wide receivers: Hall of Fame WR Isaac Bruce, Torry Holt, Ricky Proehl and Az-Zahir Hakim. When Vermeil retired after Super Bowl XXXIV, Martz replaced him as head coach, starting in the 2000 season. The Rams set a new NFL record for total offensive yards that same season, with 7,335. 5,492 of those were passing yards, also a new NFL team record. From 1999 to 2001, St. Louis became the only team in NFL history to score 500+ points in 3 consecutive years. In all, the Rams totaled 1,569 points, more than any other NFL team in any 3-year stretch. The Rams also became the first team to gain more than 20,000 yards of total offense in a 3-year stretch. Martz coached the Rams from 2000 to 2005, compiling a 53–32 regular season record and a 3–4 playoff record.

Meanwhile, Vermeil came out of retirement to coach the Kansas City Chiefs from 2001 to 2005. Despite having decent success in Kansas City, he wasn't able to lead the Chiefs to a Super Bowl appearance. However, in 2022, Vermeil earned induction into the Pro Football Hall of Fame for his work as an NFL head coach.

=== Al Saunders version ===
Al Saunders was the former wide receiver coach under Don Coryell in San Diego, and he succeeded him as head coach of the Chargers in the middle of the 1986 season. The Al Saunders variant is heavily influenced by Don Coryell and Al Saunders's former boss, former Coryell assistant and 2-time Redskins coach Joe Gibbs, whose Ace formation (single back, two wide receivers, a tight end, and a halfback) was very effective in the 1980s. The Al Saunders variant is a more conservative variant than the Martz version, but also quite complex. It is better suited for a veteran quarterback. It does not insist on size at wide receiver or halfback like the Turner variant and as such has difficulties in short yardage and red zone situations. It does not require a pair of dominant fast receivers like the Martz system, and is not as aggressive attacking down the field. Consequently, the Saunders system does not score as many points as the Martz system. Saunders's scheme is a more sound variant than Martz's scheme, offering a little more blocking and more run support for the quarterback. The Saunders variant pulls in many Coryell concepts that the Turner system eliminated in favor of simplicity. Saunders only went 17–22 in 2 1/2 years as a head coach.

== West Coast offense comparisons ==
The Coryell offense attacked vertically through seams, while the West Coast offense moved laterally as much as vertically through angles on curl and slant routes. The Coryell offense had lower completion percentages than the West Coast offense, but the returns were greater on a successful play. "The Coryell offense required more talented players, a passer who could get the ball there, and men who can really run—a lot of them," said Walsh. He said the West Coast offense was developed out of necessity to operate with less talented players. He noted, "[Coryell] already had the talent and used it brilliantly."

== Impact ==
Former head coach Marty Schottenheimer said "putting three receivers on one side and flooding that area" probably originated from the Coryell offense. Head coach Bill Belichick notes that the pass-catching tight ends that get paid the most money are "all direct descendants of Kellen Winslow" and there are fewer tight ends now that can block on the line. Former defensive coordinator Joe Collier credits the Coryell offense with creating an evolution by using multiple receivers, forcing defenses to counter with different packages. As a result, more defensive backs were drafted, and linebackers that could also cover inside receivers were sought. Defenses were altered to use nickel and dime defenses in response to offensive formation; their usage was no longer limited to down and distance. Former head coach Dick Vermeil said no other NFL offense "performs more efficiently or scores more points" than the Coryell offense.

== See also ==
- Air raid offense
