= Eight-in-the-box defense =

American football defensive strategy

In American football, an eight-in-the-box defense is a defensive alignment in which 8 of the 11 defensive players are close to the line of scrimmage.

== Description ==
The area occupied by defensive linemen and linebackers is often referred to as "the box". The box is usually about 3-5 yards in depth and spans the offensive line in width. Normally five to seven defensive players occupy this area but frequently another player is brought into the box for run support against smashmouth-oriented offensive teams or short yardage situations.

The most common occurrence of eight in the box in the NFL involves the strong safety walking down from his position (moving to within) 10-15 yards off the line of scrimmage before the ball is snapped. From this tightened position he can offer the aforementioned run support as well as jam WRs and TEs, blitz the QB, or provide flat coverage. Due to the superior athleticism of NFL players, it is not uncommon for the box safety to even provide deep coverage after the snap, giving the QB a pre-snap Cover 1 read but effectively transitioning into Cover 2 or another shell post snap. Often, to hold a disguised defense, the safety will not come down until the snap of the ball. While this is not the eight in the box strategy, it gives the same results without showing what your defense is before the snap of the ball.

== Advantages ==
Obvious advantages come off the eight in the box strategy including more defenders to stop the run game of the opponent which is the main reason for this strategy. The eight in the box scheme is also often used by teams throughout the NFL as a disguise to which players will be coming after the quarterback. This creates a level of difficulty for the offensive linemen because they will not know pre-snap who they will need to block. Quarterbacks can also use the number of defenders in the box to adjust their play selection: according to CBS Chicago, some offensive systems use packaged plays that allow the quarterback to choose between handing the ball off against a lighter box or throwing a predetermined pass route when additional defenders are committed to stopping the run.

Quick decisions will need to be made after the snap of the ball.

== Disadvantages ==
Defenses would rather not have to go to the eight in the box strategy because it takes away from the pass coverage. However, teams that run the ball effectively force defenses to go to this strategy. Once a defense does this, the offense can run play-action passes to keep the defenders near the line of scrimmage as the receivers (usually 1 or 2 since, often, heavy packages are in the game including tight ends in place of receivers) run by them and have an entire field to run away from a cornerback, putting the defensive backs at a disadvantage. This scheme can also work against the team that is covering the run. In a base defensive set, there are 3 levels of defenders; line, linebackers, and safeties. The safeties are there to keep runners from going all the way for the score. However, when one safety creeps down toward the line of scrimmage, that leaves only one high safety to make the tackle once the runner has broken the first line of defense.

== Bibliography ==
- Kirwan, Pat and Siegerman, David, Take Your Eye Off The Ball, Triumph, 2010.
- Rahme, Dave, With foes stacking the box to stop the run, Syracuse University offense turns to passing game The Post Standard. Sept. 24, 2010
