= Two-level defense =

Defense formation in American football

In American football, a two-level defense is a defensive formation with only two layers of defense instead of the customary three layers.

== Overview ==
In a standard three-level defense, there are three layers: the forcing unit (consisting mainly of linemen but possibly also including blitzing linebackers and defensive backs), the underneath coverage (usually consisting of linebackers but possibly including other players, especially in the case of a zone blitz), and the contain unit (mostly defensive backs). A two-level defense does away with the contain unit in favor of increased pressure on the offense. Two-level defenses will often use one deep safety (as deep as 28 yards at the snap) to enforce an end line on the offense, but the 46 defense (aka "Bear 4-6"), most famously employed by the Chicago Bears in the 1980s, is a two level defense with contain handled solely by the single coverage skills of the cornerbacks. The "Bear" can also function as a three-level defense, and indeed concealment of the defensive structure is a key to making this defense work.

The two-level was invented to combat the run and shoot offense in the 1980s, but has stayed in use due to its adaptability in combating all types of offenses. The defense of spread formations remains a strong suit of this model.
