= Smashmouth offense =

American football offensive scheme favoring the run game

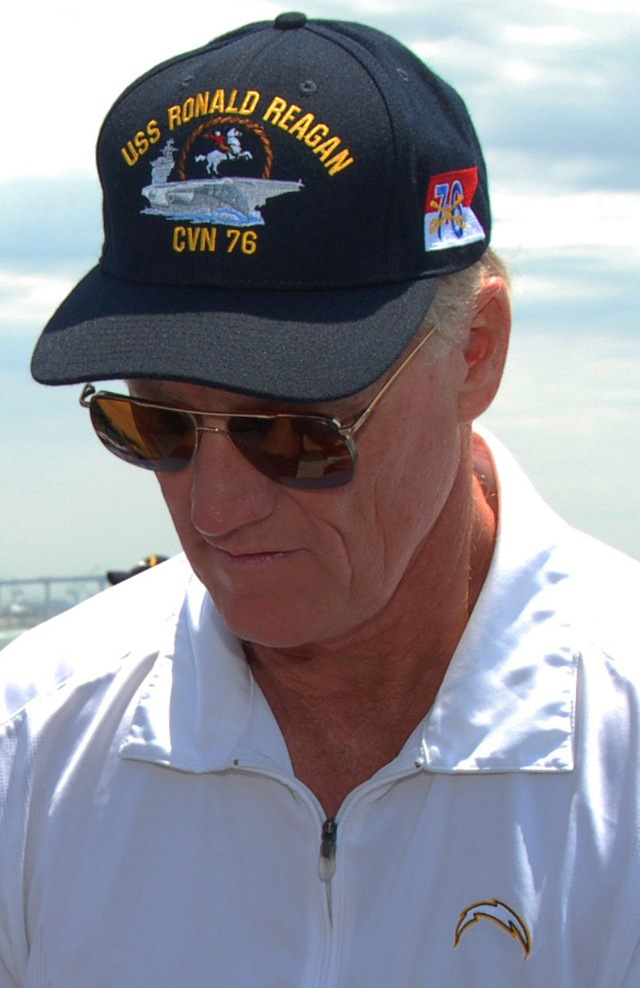
Marty Schottenheimer signing autographs in 2006. Schottenheimer's smashmouth coaching philosophy, known as "Marty Ball", often included run-heavy schemes, including his use of the Power concept.

In American football, a smashmouth offense is an offensive system that relies on a strong running game, where most of the plays run by the offense are handoffs to the fullback or tailback. It is a more traditional style of offense that often results in a higher time of possession by running the ball heavily. So-called "smash-mouth football" is often run out of the I-formation, wishbone formation, or pro set, with tight ends and receivers used as blockers. Though the offense is run-oriented, pass opportunities can develop as defenses play close to the line. Play-action can be very effective for a run-oriented team.

== "Three Yards and a Cloud of Dust" ==
This term describes run-heavy offenses such as those used by coach Woody Hayes of Ohio State University in the 1950s and 1960s. A grind-it-out ball control offense, it relies on time of possession utilizing a high percentage of inside running plays off of handoffs by the quarterback to advance the ball down the field. Hayes relied primarily on the fullback off-tackle play. A quarterback under Hayes would often throw fewer than 10 passes a game. Hayes is credited as saying "Three things can happen when you pass the ball, and two of them are bad".

== Run to Daylight ==
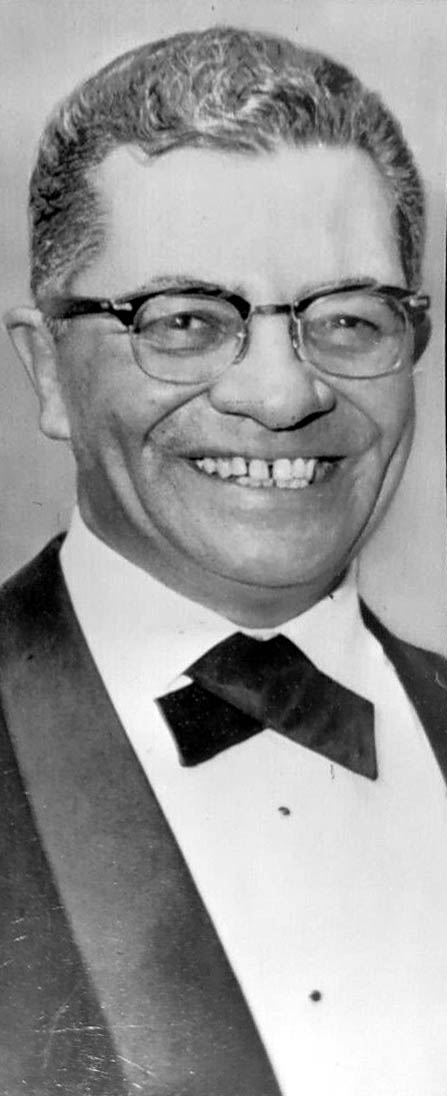
Vince Lombardi in 1964. The Packers sweep was a designed gap run, using pull guards to create seal blocks for the ball carrier.

The central two plays in this philosophy are off-tackle run and the so-called Packers sweep. In both plays, the offensive line would work to seal off a running lane for the back to use, and the running back would aim for this corridor rather than a specific pre-snap hole. In the off-tackle run, the quarterback would hand off (often to the fullback) who started running to the position between the tight end and tackle, but would aim for the best hole that developed. In the sweep, the two guards would pull to form the outside wall of the running lane, while the center and run side tackle would form the inside wall of the lane. The fullback would lead the path through the lane for the half back, who received a pitch from the quarterback.

== College teams that used the Smashmouth offense ==
- Nebraska Cornhuskers
- Stanford Cardinal
- Fresno State Bulldogs
- Wisconsin Badgers
- Arkansas Razorbacks
- Alabama Crimson Tide
- Ohio State Buckeyes
- Michigan Wolverines

== NFL teams that used the Smashmouth offense ==
Start	End	Team	Head coach	Offensive coordinator
1959	1967	Green Bay Packers	Vince Lombardi	
1969	1970	Washington Redskins	Vince Lombardi	
1977	1980	Dallas Cowboys	Tom Landry	Dan Reeves
1981	1992	Denver Broncos	Dan Reeves	Rod Dowhower, Mike Shanahan, Chan Gailey, and George Henshaw
1982	1992	Chicago Bears	Mike Ditka	Ed Hughes and Greg Landry
1986	1991	Minnesota Vikings	Jerry Burns	Bob Schnelker and Tom Moore
1993	1996	New York Giants	Dan Reeves	George Henshaw
1997	2003	Atlanta Falcons	Dan Reeves	George Sefcik and Pete Mangurian
1997	1999	New Orleans Saints	Mike Ditka	Danny Abramowicz
2005	2006	Jacksonville Jaguars	Jack Del Rio	Carl Smith
2008	2011	Miami Dolphins	Tony Sparano	Dan Henning and Brian Daboll
2009	2014	New York Jets	Rex Ryan	Brian Schottenheimer Tony Sparano and Marty Mornhinweg
2015	2016	Buffalo Bills	Rex Ryan	Greg Roman (Note: Roman's offense has also incorporated elements of the Option and Spread offenses, utilizing mobile quarterbacks such as Tyrod Taylor and Lamar Jackson.) and Anthony Lynn
2016	2017	Tennessee Titans	Mike Mularkey	Terry Robiskie
2016	2019	Dallas Cowboys	Jason Garrett	Scott Linehan
2019	2025	Baltimore Ravens	John Harbaugh	Greg Roman
2019	present	San Francisco 49ers	Kyle Shanahan	-
