= Pistol offense =

American football formation and strategy

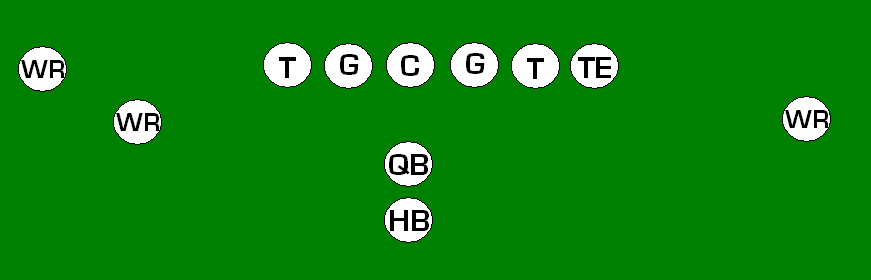
Chris Ault's "pistol" formation

The pistol offense is an American football formation and strategy popularized by Chris Ault when he was head coach at the University of Nevada. It is a hybrid of the traditional shotgun and single back offenses. In the pistol offense, also commonly referred to as the "pistol formation", the quarterback lines up four yards behind the center, which is much closer than the seven-yard setback in a traditional shotgun formation. The running back then lines up three yards directly behind the quarterback, which is in contrast to the shotgun, where they are beside each other. It is argued that the position of the quarterback in the pistol formation strikes an advantageous compromise: the quarterback is close enough to the line of scrimmage to be able to read the defense, as with run situation sets such as the I formation, but far enough back to give him extra time and a better vision of the field for passing plays, as in the shotgun. The pistol formation is thus very versatile, particularly if the quarterback himself is a threat to run the ball, which makes it difficult for the defense to correctly anticipate the play. This flexibility is enhanced by the option, where the quarterback reads one or more defenders and reacts to their responses to the snap, then makes a rapid decision whether to hand off the ball to the running back or keep it and run himself.

== History ==
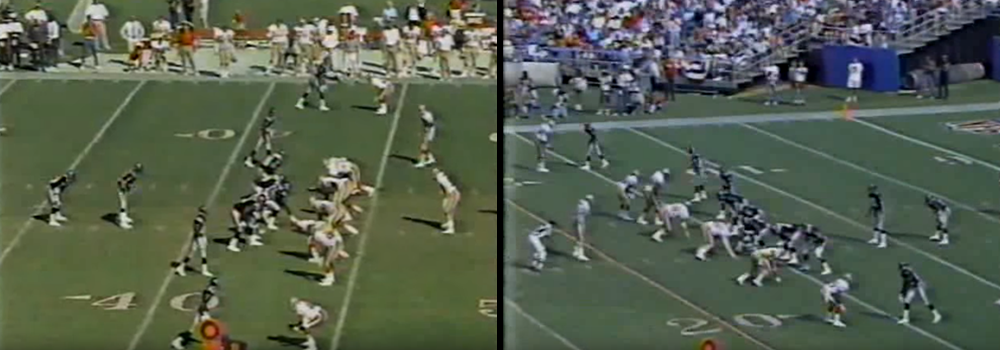
Pistol formation used by Jerry Glanville in the 1990 season with the Atlanta Falcons against the San Francisco 49ers

University of Nevada head coach Chris Ault popularized the hybrid alignment (and named it "the Pistol") in 2005. While the pistol offense has been experimented with by dozens of college football teams such as LSU, Syracuse, Indiana, and Missouri, Ault's Nevada Wolf Pack is most strongly associated with the formation. Using the Pistol Offense, during the 2009 season, Nevada led the nation in rushing at 345 yards a game and were second in total offense at 506 yards. The Wolf Pack also became the first team in college football history with three 1,000-yard rushers in the same season: quarterback Colin Kaepernick and running backs Luke Lippincott and Vai Taua.

Football Championship Subdivision team James Madison University used the pistol to help beat #13 ranked Virginia Tech on September 11, 2010. The pistol has also made the transition to the NFL, first used by the Kansas City Chiefs in 2008 with offensive coordinator Chan Gailey and Quarterback Tyler Thigpen, and became popular once used by the Carolina Panthers with Cam Newton and Robert Griffin III of the Washington Redskins, as well as the aforementioned Colin Kaepernick with the San Francisco 49ers, who in the NFL Playoffs versus the Green Bay Packers set the all-time single game rushing record for a quarterback with 181 yards. Along with the wildcat, the pistol has added more of a college "playmaker" aspect to the professional game. After week 10 of 2023 the Los Angeles Rams adopted a pistol formation 16% of the time with the resulting plays being pass/run about 50/50, challenging defenses to adapt their coverages.

On December 5, 2010, the Pittsburgh Steelers used the Pistol offense so quarterback Ben Roethlisberger could play with a bad foot. Today, it is common in all levels of college football, and is gaining popularity among high school teams and in the NFL.

== Advantages ==
The pistol retains the position and advantages of a shotgun formation, allowing the quarterback to see easily over the line and make downfield reads. The running back, however, is positioned further back, allowing him to time to run up and build momentum similar to a play under center. The pistol offense can effectively use draw plays, counters, and options using three-wide receiver formations or multiple tight ends combined with a fullback for pass protection. In a pistol formation, handoffs occur 2-3 yards closer to the line of scrimmage than in the shotgun. In the traditional shotgun, run plays are most effectively run to the side opposite the running back, without a cutback to the other side. In the pistol, they can be effectively executed to either side of the QB, opening up more options for the offense. This can make for a more effective running game, but may limit pass efficiency due to quicker recognition of play action by linebackers and defensive backs. This formation works well with dual threat quarterbacks who can both throw and run and is also used when quarterback's mobility has been limited by injury.
