= 46 defense =

American football defensive formation

46 Formation, original 4–3 base set

The 46 defense is an American football defensive formation with six players along the line of scrimmage. Regarded as an eight men in the box defense, it features two players at linebacker depth playing linebacker technique, and three defensive backs. The 46 defense was originally developed and popularized with the Chicago Bears by their defensive coordinator Buddy Ryan, who later became head coach of the Philadelphia Eagles and Arizona Cardinals.

Unlike most defensive formations that take their names from the number of defensive linemen and linebackers on the field (i.e. the 4–3 defense has 4 linemen and 3 linebackers), the name "46" originally came from the jersey number of Doug Plank, who was a starting strong safety for the Bears when Ryan developed the defense, a role typically played in the formation as a surrogate linebacker.

The 46 defense is most effective against the two back, two wide receiver sets that many teams commonly used in the 1980s. However, the defensive formation has been rarely used in professional and college football since then as offenses have adapted to use multiple receiver and spread formations to counteract the 46.

== Description ==
The 46 defense was an innovative defense with a unique defensive front, designed to confuse and put pressure on the opposing offense, especially their quarterback. Compared to a 4–3 base defense, the 46 dramatically shifts the defensive line to the weak side (the opposite end from the offense's tight end), with both guards and the center "covered" by the left defensive end and both defensive tackles. This front forced offenses to immediately account for the defenders lined up directly in front of them, making it considerably harder to execute blocking assignments such as pulling, trapping and pass protection in general. Moreover, the weak side defensive end would be aligned one to two yards outside the left offensive tackle, leaving the opposing tackle man-on-man when trying to block the pass rush.

Another key feature of the 46 is that both outside linebackers tend to play on the strong side of the formation. To avoid confusion, the strong and weak side linebackers (who are no longer lined up on opposite sides) are often renamed the 'Jack' and 'Charlie' linebackers, respectively. The linebackers line up behind the linemen somewhere between one and three yards from the line of scrimmage. The primary tactic is to rush between five and eight players on each play, either to get to the quarterback quickly or disrupt running plays, although dropping some players back into pass coverage after seemingly indicating that they will blitz (see zone blitzing) is another method of creating confusion. Ryan would use all of these rushers to out-man and overwhelm the offense. Another major key to the 46 is the ability of the cornerbacks to play man free and bump and run coverage. Bump and run can allow the defense to take away the quarterback's immediate decision-making ability, by disrupting the timing of short routes needed to make a quick throw to beat the 46 defense.

The formation was very effective in the 1980s NFL because it often negated a team's running game and forced them to throw the ball. This was difficult for many teams at the time because most offensive passing games centered on the play-action pass, a situation that often favored the defense even further with the quarterback lined up to receive the snap from directly behind the center.

Currently, the 46 is rarely used in professional and college football. This is largely because of multiple receiver and spread formations. The eight-man line that the 46 presented was most effective against the two-back, two–wide receiver sets common in the 1980s.

A weakness of the 46 defense is that with eight defensive players lining up near the line of scrimmage and only three in the secondary, it leaves areas open for receivers to catch passes. Also, timed passes can be thrown before the players blitzing have a chance to reach the quarterback. When the Miami Dolphins gave the Bears their only loss of the 1985 season, Miami exploited these weaknesses with quarterback Dan Marino's quick release of the ball, and their receivers' ability to beat the one-on-one coverage of Chicago's cornerbacks.

Another problem with the 46 defense is that most teams do not have enough impact players to run the 46 as effectively as the Bears and Ryan's other two major successes, the late 1980s Philadelphia Eagles for whom he was head coach and the 1993 Houston Oilers for whom he was defensive coordinator, did. Those teams fielded some of the best front-seven defenses ever, and included such players as Jerome Brown, Mike Singletary, Steve McMichael, Richard Dent, Dan Hampton, Clyde Simmons, Reggie White, Otis Wilson, Seth Joyner, William Fuller, and Wilber Marshall.

In today's game, the 46 defense is often simplified to its main component of walking the strong safety up to the line of scrimmage as an eighth man in the box to help contain the run. Defenses today may also run safety blitzes and corner blitzes at crucial moments without committing wholly to the "46" defense. Up front, teams still use the concept of the "T-N-T" alignment, where two defensive ends are covering (lined up directly across from) the guards, and a nose tackle is covering the center. In the case of a zone-blocking scheme, this makes it difficult for the offensive linemen to reach any of the linebackers on the second level.

== Lining up ==
This is where defensive players would line up against a normal Pro Set offense.

- Defensive ends: The weak side defensive end lines up one to two yards outside the weak side offensive tackle. During run plays, his objective is to protect against reverses and counters. Otherwise, on pass plays, he goes after the quarterback. The strong side defensive end lines up on the outside shoulder of the strong side guard. His objective is to make sure that the offensive guard in front of him does not push him inside and does not get released to block the linebacker.
- Defensive tackles: The weak side defensive tackle lines up on the outside shoulder of the guard. His main objective is the same as the strong side defensive end – to avoid being pinched inside or letting the guard release to block the linebacker. The other defensive tackle essentially becomes a nose guard and lines up in front of the center.
- Linebackers: The jack linebacker lines up on the outside shoulder of the strong tight end and just slightly behind the line of scrimmage. This allows him to contain runs on the outside, to blitz, or to drop into multiple coverages on the pass. The charley linebacker also lines up slightly behind the line of scrimmage, but on the inside (rather than outside) shoulder of the tight end. This allows him to cover the tight end and make it difficult for the tight end to achieve a quick release. The middle linebacker lines up about four to four and a half yards behind the line of scrimmage and directly in front of the strong offensive tackle.
- Safeties: The strong safety lines up four to four and a half yards off the line of scrimmage and stands directly in front of the weak side tackle. The free safety lines up about ten to twelve yards away from the line of scrimmage and will stand directly in front of the weak side guard.
- Cornerbacks: The corners will line up on the line of scrimmage in bump and run coverage, or at times will line up seven to eight yards off of the line in front of their receivers in man-free coverage.

When three or more receivers are used by the offense, the defense makes what is called a jayhawk adjustment. The charlie linebacker will step back to where the middle linebacker was in the normal alignment, the middle linebacker will move to where the strong safety was aligned and the strong safety will move out to cover the third receiver. If the offense uses a fourth receiver, the middle linebacker lines up in front of the center and the charlie linebacker would cover the fourth receiver.

To note, there is nothing particularly innovative about this particular set of assignments. For example, the strong safety could assume either the charley or the jack linebacker role. The linebacker displaced would line up over the weak side offensive tackle, where the strong safety is normally found.

== See also ==
- Glossary of American football
- 1985 Chicago Bears season
