= Dime defense =

American football defensive formation

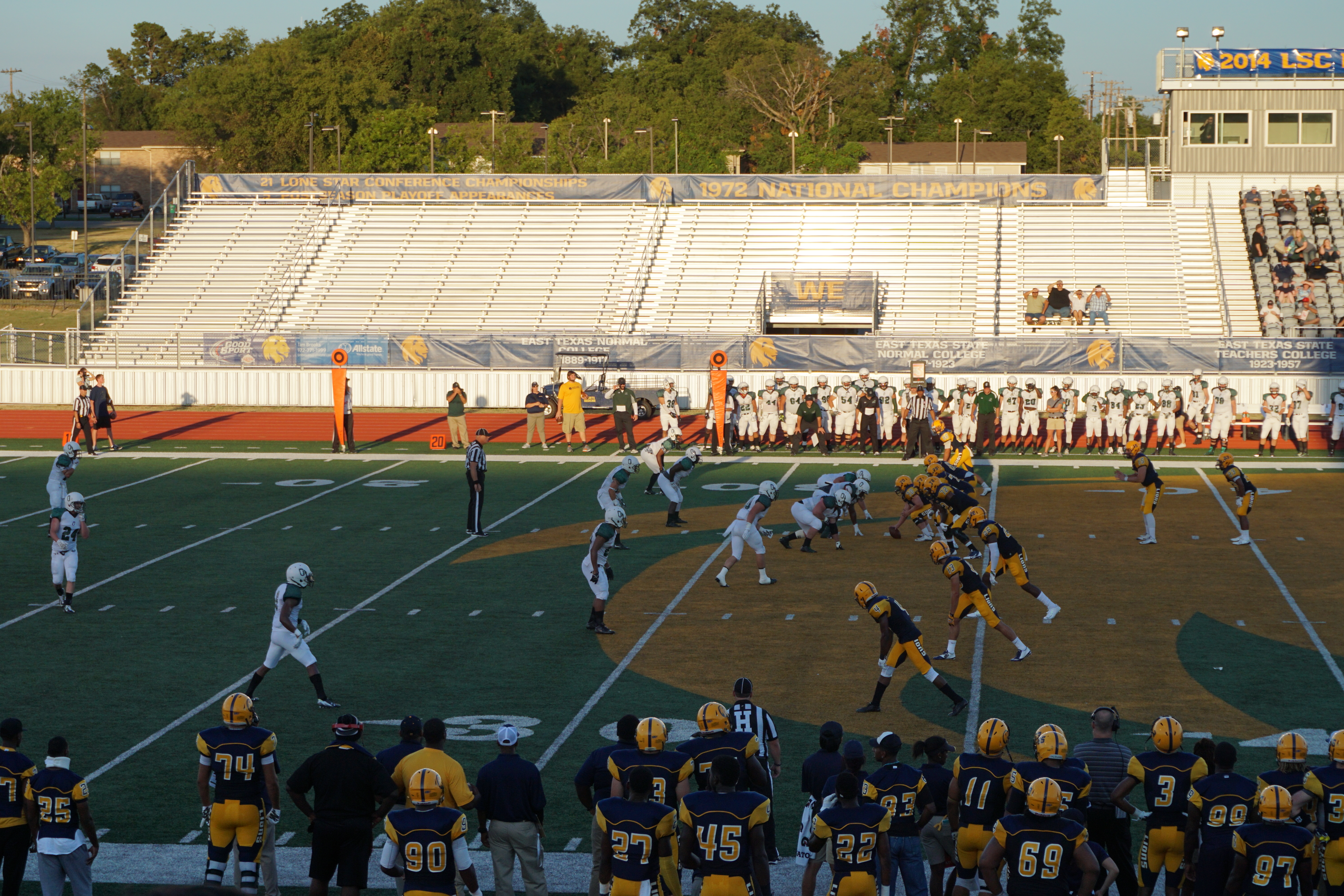
The Adams State Grizzlies in a dime defense against the Texas A&M–Commerce Lions in 2015

A dime defense (4 cornerbacks), lined up against 4 wide receivers on offense. Depicted is the "3-2-6" variant of the dime defense (3 linemen, 2 linebackers, 6 defensive backs) typically deployed against the spread offense, but a conventional dime formation would have 4 linemen and only one linebacker.

In American football, the dime defense is a defensive alignment that uses six defensive backs. It is usually employed in obvious passing situations. The formation usually consists of six defensive backs, usually two safeties and four cornerbacks, and has either four down linemen and one linebacker, or three down linemen and two linebackers. This formation is used to prevent the offense from completing a medium- to long-range pass play. This may be because the offense's running game is inefficient, time is an issue, or they need a long pass for a first down. It is also used against teams whose pass-to-run ratio predominantly favors pass. The formation, however, is vulnerable to running plays as the formation is missing two linebackers, or a linebacker and a down lineman.

A dime defense differs from the nickel defense – from which it derives its name – in that it adds a sixth defensive back to the secondary. This sixth defensive back is called a "dimeback" (D). The defense gets its name both because a dime is the next denomination up from a nickel, and that the dime defense features two additional defensive backs (two nickels equal a dime).

There are also "quarter" and "half-dollar" formations, each protecting against progressively deeper and more likely pass attempts. In 2010, the New York Giants consistently added an extra safety instead of an extra cornerback, resulting in three safeties and three cornerbacks. This has been called a "giant dime".
