= West Coast offense =

American football offense with a greater emphasis on passing than on running

The West Coast offense is an offensive scheme in American football that places a greater emphasis on high percentage, horizontal passing than on the deep pass or running. The offense typically relies on the short passing game to gain first downs, and instead allows the receiver to gain the majority of the yards after the catch.

There are two similar but distinct National Football League (NFL) offensive strategic systems that are commonly referred to as "West Coast offenses". Originally, the term referred to the unrelated Air Coryell system popularized by Don Coryell with the San Diego Chargers. Following a journalistic error, however, it now more commonly refers to the offensive system invented by Bill Walsh while he was the offensive coordinator for the Cincinnati Bengals in the 1970s. The offense is characterized by short, horizontal passing routes in lieu of running plays to "stretch out" defenses, opening up the potential for long runs or long passes. It was popularized and perfected when Walsh was the head coach of the San Francisco 49ers from 1979 to 1988.

The Bill Walsh coaching tree has led to several future NFL coaches adapting aspects of the West Coast offense, including George Seifert, Mike Holmgren, Mike Sherman, Steve Mariucci, Andy Reid, Jon Gruden, Dennis Green, and Mike Shanahan, among others. NFL players notable for executing the West Coast offense include Aaron Rodgers, Virgil Carter, Joe Montana, Jerry Rice, Steve Young, Donovan McNabb, Terrell Owens, Rich Gannon, and Tim Brown.

== History and use of the term ==
The term "West Coast offense", though most often associated with Cincinnati Bengals quarterback coach and, later, San Francisco 49ers head coach Bill Walsh, may actually derive from a remark made by then New York Giants coach Bill Parcells after the Giants defeated the 49ers 17–3 in the 1985 NFL Playoffs. Parcells—a believer in "old-school" tough defense over finesse-oriented offense featuring frequent, high-percentage passing— derided the 49ers' offense with the statement: "What do you think of that West Coast Offense now?" In 1993, a Bernie Kosar quotation used to describe the 1993 Dallas Cowboys' offense as "West Coast offense" was publicized by Sports Illustrated writer Paul Zimmerman ("Dr. Z"). Originally, Kosar had meant a comparison with the "Air Coryell" system used by West Coast teams in the 1970s, the San Diego Chargers and Oakland Raiders in particular. A reporter mistakenly applied Kosar's statement to the 1980s-era attack of Walsh's 49ers.

Initially, Walsh resisted having the term misapplied to his own distinct system and was especially incensed by the use of the word "finesse" in reference to his sophisticated offensive schemes. Zimmerman notes that an article of his so misapplying the term provoked a phone call from an upset Walsh: "He called me up... (saying) that wasn't his offense". Still, the moniker stuck. Now the term is commonly used to refer to a range of pass-oriented offenses that may not be closely related to either the Air Coryell system or Walsh's pass-strategy.

The origins of the offensive system devised by Walsh go back to Paul Brown, coach of the Cleveland Browns and later the Cincinnati Bengals. Under Brown's tenure, Walsh was tasked with devising an offensive plan suited to Bengal quarterback Virgil Carter, who had an accurate but relatively weak arm. In response, Walsh created a system based on short, high-percentage passes, favoring straight and direct ten- to fifteen-yard strikes over forty- to fifty-yard "bombs" - the very opposite of the thrust of the long pass oriented later Air Coryell system. This system compensated for any weakness in the quarterback's arm, as it allowed the ball to be thrown to short and intermediate routes where receivers with running ability could attempt to make up for any shortage in yards after catch.

Walsh's system immediately paid off, as Virgil Carter led the league in passing percentage in 1971. Strong-armed Ken Anderson, initially a "project" of Walsh's, replaced Carter as Cincinnati's starting quarterback in 1972 and was even more successful in his execution of Walsh's complicated, versatile patterns, leading the Bengals to a division title in his first year as starting quarterback. In 1975, he brought widespread recognition to the West Coast offense in a nationally televised Monday-night contest between the Bengals and the Buffalo Bills, whose offense was built around league-leading rusher O. J. Simpson. Anderson's 447 passing yards were enough to overshadow Simpson's 197 yards on the ground in a Bengals win that proved a milestone, providing a striking contrast between the "old" ground game of defense-oriented football and the new game envisioned by Walsh—a game of higher scores, more action, and much air travel.

At the end of the 1975 season, Bengals head coach Paul Brown would retire, and he appointed Bill Johnson as his successor instead of Walsh. Ambitious and anxious to become a head coach, Walsh resigned from the Bengals and left Cincinnati for the West Coast, taking along his films of Ken Anderson running his offensive schemes to serve as a teaching aid for quarterback Dan Fouts after Walsh had been hired as an assistant coach for the San Diego Chargers. Next, after two years of success as head coach at Stanford University, Walsh received and accepted the call to be head coach of the San Francisco 49ers. He would soon transform the 49ers from a mediocre team to a perennial league powerhouse, recalling the dominance of Vince Lombardi's Green Bay Packer teams of the 1960s, and of Chuck Noll's Pittsburgh Steelers of the 1970s. His versatile offensive schemes, along with his high percentage passing game and emphasis on ball control, complemented the skills of Joe Montana, who implemented Walsh's visionary system with great success as the 49ers' starting quarterback. The West Coast offense was then passed on by Walsh's disciples, and its principles still remain in use today.

=== Vertical ===
Bernie Kosar used the term “West Coast offense” to describe the offense formalized by Sid Gillman with the AFL Chargers in the 1960s and later by Don Coryell's St. Louis Cardinals and Chargers in the 1970s and 1980s. Al Davis, an assistant under Gillman, also carried his version to the Oakland Raiders, where his successors John Rauch, John Madden, and Tom Flores continued to employ and expand upon its basic principles. This is the "West Coast offense" as Kosar originally used the term. It is now commonly referred to as the "Air Coryell" system, however, and instead the term West Coast offense is usually used to describe Walsh's system.

The offense uses a specific naming system, with the routes for wide receivers and tight ends receiving three digit numbers, and routes for backs having unique names. For example, a pass play in 3 digit form might be "Split Right 787 check swing, check V". (see Offensive Nomenclature). This provides an efficient way to communicate many different plays with minimal memorization. Conversely, the Walsh "West Coast offense" could in theory have more freedom, since route combinations are not limited by 0-9 digits, but at the price of much more memorization required by the players.

== Walsh's West Coast offense ==
Walsh formulated what has become popularly known as the West Coast offense during his tenure as assistant coach for the Cincinnati Bengals from 1968 to 1975, while working under the tutelage of mentor Paul Brown. Bengals quarterback Virgil Carter would be the first player to successfully implement Walsh's system, leading the NFL in pass completion percentage in 1971. Ken Anderson later replaced Carter as Cincinnati's starting QB, and was even more successful. In his 16-year career in the NFL, Anderson made four trips to the Pro Bowl, won four passing titles, was named NFL MVP in 1981 (and also appeared in Super Bowl XVI that year), and set what was then the record for completion percentage in a single season in 1982 (70.66%).

Walsh installed a modified version of this system when he became head coach of the San Francisco 49ers, serving as the team's coach from 1979 to 1988. Walsh's 49ers won three Super Bowls during this period, behind the passing abilities of legendary quarterback Joe Montana. Besides the 3 Super Bowl wins, Walsh won 6 NFC West division titles and compiled a 92–59–1 regular season record, with a 10–4 mark in the NFL playoffs. As a result, Walsh's version has come to be known as the "West Coast offense". Montana thrived for many years as the starting QB for the 49ers. He captured 4 Super Bowl titles (three of them under Walsh), 3 Super Bowl MVP awards, and 2 AP NFL MVP titles while in San Francisco in the 1980s. Montana and Walsh have both been inducted into the Pro Football Hall of Fame.

== Walsh's coaching tree ==
Several members of Bill Walsh's coaching tree went on to successfully implement his West Coast Offense system.

George Seifert succeeded Walsh as San Francisco's head coach in 1989, and won two Super Bowls with the 49ers; once with Joe Montana at quarterback in 1989, and later with fellow Hall of Famer Steve Young in 1994.

Paul Hackett was another former assistant coach who once served under Walsh. He served as a 49ers assistant from 1983 to 1985, coaching quarterbacks and wide receivers. During this time, Hackett helped San Francisco win Super Bowl XIX. He next served as offensive coordinator for the Dallas Cowboys under Tom Landry from 1986 to 1988. Hackett would later teach his version of Walsh's offense to several coaches, including former Green Bay Packers head coach Mike McCarthy. McCarthy, who was the Packers head coach from 2006 until December 2018, would go on to win a Super Bowl himself with the use of the West Coast offense in 2010, with the help of superstar quarterback Aaron Rodgers. McCarthy then served as head coach of the Dallas Cowboys from 2020-2024, but he wasn't able to help the Cowboys reach the Super Bowl.

Mike Holmgren is another prominent member of Bill Walsh's coaching tree. When Holmgren first came to San Francisco as an assistant coach, he started as Walsh's quarterbacks coach from 1986 to 1988. Holmgren then served as offensive coordinator for the 49ers under Seifert from 1989 to 1991. From 1992 to 1998, Holmgren was the head coach of the Green Bay Packers. He won a Super Bowl with the Packers in 1996 behind the quarterbacking of 3-time NFL MVP Brett Favre. He then returned to the Super Bowl in 1997, but the Packers lost to the Denver Broncos, who were coached by Mike Shanahan. Holmgren later became head coach of the Seattle Seahawks, leading them from 1999 to 2008. They played in Super Bowl XL after the 2005 season. The Seahawks, however, lost to the Pittsburgh Steelers. Holmgren is credited for helping mold successful quarterbacks such as Montana, Young, Favre and Matt Hasselbeck. As a head coach, he compiled an overall 174–122 record in the NFL: 161–111 in the regular season, along with a 13–11 playoff record, 3 Super Bowl appearances and 1 Super Bowl title.

One of Holmgren's former assistants, Jon Gruden, has had reasonable success running the West Coast offense in his own right. He started his head coaching career with the Oakland Raiders, leading them from 1998 to 2001, and turned the Raiders into a strong playoff contender. Gruden then went on to become head coach of the Tampa Bay Buccaneers, winning Super Bowl XXXVII after the 2002 season. Gruden coached the Buccaneers from 2002 to 2008. After several years as a color commentator on ESPN Monday Night Football, he signed a deal to return to the Raiders as head coach for the 2018 NFL season. Gruden served as Raiders head coach from 2018 to 2021.

Another one-time member of Holmgren's coaching staff, Andy Reid, has successfully utilized the West Coast offense during his tenure as a head coach for both the Philadelphia Eagles and Kansas City Chiefs. From 1999 to 2012, Reid served as Eagles head coach. Since 2013, he has served as head coach of the Chiefs. Over the course of Andy Reid's long and highly successful head coaching career, both the Eagles and Chiefs enjoyed many winning seasons under his watch. Reid coached the Eagles to 5 NFC Championship Game appearances (4 straight seasons from 2001 to 2004, and again in 2008). During his Eagles days, his teams were mostly led by QB Donovan McNabb. Then, from 2018 to 2024, Reid coached the Chiefs to 7 straight AFC Championship Game appearances. Since 2018, he has been helped by superstar QB Patrick Mahomes. Reid has appeared in the Super Bowl 6 times as a head coach: Super Bowl XXXIX with the Eagles, and Super Bowls LIV, LV, LVII, LVIII, and LIX with the Chiefs. He has won all 3 of his Super Bowl titles with the Chiefs. As of the end of the 2024 NFL season, Reid has won 28 NFL playoff games, and he trails only Bill Belichick (31) for most postseason wins by an NFL head coach.

Two of Reid's former assistants, John Harbaugh and Doug Pederson, have also succeeded in both reaching and winning a Super Bowl as head coaches. Harbaugh served as an Eagles assistant under Reid from 1999 to 2007. From 2008-2025, Harbaugh enjoyed a largely successful run as head coach of the Baltimore Ravens. He guided the Ravens to victory in Super Bowl XLVII. Baltimore defeated the San Francisco 49ers, who were coached by John's younger brother, Jim Harbaugh. Pederson first worked for the Eagles under Reid from 2009 to 2012, and then served as the Chiefs' offensive coordinator under Reid from 2013 to 2015. Pederson became head coach of the Philadelphia Eagles in 2016 and installed his own version of the West Coast offense. The following year, despite losing rising star quarterback Carson Wentz to a torn ACL, Pederson was still able to guide his team to a world championship. The Eagles, with the help of backup QB and Super Bowl MVP Nick Foles, defeated the New England Patriots in Super Bowl LII. Pederson served as head coach of the Eagles from 2016 to 2020, and then as head coach of the Jacksonville Jaguars from 2022-2024.

Mike Shanahan is another NFL head coach who has had success running the West Coast offense. He first started his NFL coaching career with the Denver Broncos in the 1980s, coaching receivers and then serving as offensive coordinator under Dan Reeves from 1984 to 1987. It was Shanahan's work with the Broncos offense, particularly rising star quarterback John Elway, that earned him the head coaching job of the Los Angeles Raiders for the 1988 season. His career as head coach initially got off to a rocky start, as he couldn't co-exist with the Raiders' maverick owner Al Davis. Shanahan only compiled an 8–12 record in Los Angeles, and was fired early in the 1989 season. After again serving as an assistant for the Broncos from 1990 to 1991, he rebuilt his solid reputation working as offensive coordinator of the 49ers under George Seifert from 1992 to 1994, helping the team win Super Bowl XXIX. Shanahan then enjoyed a strong, lengthy tenure as head coach of the Broncos from 1995 to 2008. During his time as head coach, he won two Super Bowls with the Broncos in 1997 & 1998, utilizing John Elway's passing skills and leadership. Shanahan's run-heavy variation of the offense, under the leadership of offensive coordinator Gary Kubiak, is also known for utilizing previously unheralded running backs, including 1998 NFL MVP Terrell Davis, and developing them into league-leading rushers behind small, yet powerful, Zone Blocking offensive lines. Hall of Fame players from the Broncos' Super Bowl-winning teams in '97 & '98 that played on offense include Elway, Davis, and tight end Shannon Sharpe.

Shanahan also served as head coach of the Washington Redskins from 2010 to 2013, but his time in Washington was less successful than his tenure with the Broncos. He guided the Redskins to the NFC East division title in 2012, with a trip to the NFL playoffs. During this time he compiled a 24–40 record over 4 seasons with an 0–1 playoff mark. Overall, Mike Shanahan accumulated a record of 178–144: 170–138 in the regular season, with an 8–6 postseason record that included 2 Super Bowl victories. He has also developed a coaching tree.

Gary Kubiak has had a stellar career as an NFL head coach in his own right. After working as Shanahan's offensive coordinator on the Broncos from 1995 to 2005, Kubiak served as the head coach of the Houston Texans from 2006 to 2013. After serving as the Baltimore Ravens' offensive coordinator in 2014, he became head coach of the Broncos in the 2015 season, and won Super Bowl 50. Gary's son, Klint Kubiak, was recently named the head coach of the Las Vegas Raiders.

Although Mike Shanahan's tenure as Washington Redskins head coach wasn't completely successful, his tenure did produce 3 rising star head coaches: Matt LaFleur, Sean McVay, and his son, Kyle Shanahan. Kyle Shanahan has been the head coach of the San Francisco 49ers since 2017. Despite often leading teams plagued by injuries, Shanahan has molded the 49ers into a physical, hard-nosed team with a potent run-first version of the West Coast offense.

Matt LaFleur has been the head coach of the Green Bay Packers since 2019. From 2019-2021, LaFleur guided the Packers to 3 straight NFC North division titles. From 2019-2022, LaFleur coached legendary quarterback Aaron Rodgers. Since 2023, LaFleur has molded current Packers quarterback Jordan Love into one of the NFL's premier passers. Matt LaFleur's younger brother, Mike LaFleur, was recently named the head coach of the Arizona Cardinals.

Sean McVay has served as the head coach of the Los Angeles Rams since 2017, and has already built a strong track record as a winning coach, guiding Los Angeles to 2 Super Bowl appearances. His Rams lost Super Bowl LIII to the New England Patriots. However, McVay won Super Bowl LVI, when the Rams defeated the Cincinnati Bengals. It was the team's first Super Bowl title since returning to Los Angeles from St. Louis.

== Similar college offenses ==
LaVell Edwards and Dewey Warren created an offensive system similar to the West Coast offense at Brigham Young University (BYU) in 1973.

One reason for the success of this version of the offense was in its simplicity. Norm Chow said the offenses had around 12 basic pass plays and 5 basic run plays that were run from a variety of formations, with only some plays tagged for extra versatility, so that the players knew the offense by the second day of practice.

The highpoint of the BYU offense was an NCAA Division I-A national football championship in 1984 and a Heisman Trophy for Ty Detmer in 1990. BYU broke over 100 NCAA records for passing and total offense during Edwards' tenure. Several coaches and players associated with BYU's football program had success with this offense at BYU and elsewhere, including Virgil Carter, Mike Holmgren, Andy Reid, Brian Billick, Ted Tollner, Doug Scovil, Norm Chow, Jim McMahon, Steve Young, Ty Detmer, and Steve Sarkisian.

The University of Washington Huskies were among the first of the Pac-10 teams and in 1970, under coach Jim Owens and quarterback Sonny Sixkiller, used a variation of what would later come to be known as the West Coast offense with great success. Years later in 2002, under coach Keith Gilbertson and quarterback Cody Pickett, the Huskies ran a variation of Walsh's West Coast offense to a conference championship and a top four passing attack averaging 352.4 yards per game. Today, the West Coast offense no longer only resides on the west coast, but can be found in schools across the nation, including Boise State, and Vanderbilt. Former Pittsburgh and Stanford head coach Walt Harris also used a variation of the West Coast offense during his stint at Pittsburgh.

== Theory ==
The popular term "West Coast Offense" is more of a philosophy and an approach to the game than it is a set of plays or formations. Traditional offensive thinking argues that a team must establish its running game first, which will draw the defense in and open up vertical passing lanes downfield; i.e., passing lanes that run perpendicular to the line of scrimmage.

Bill Walsh's West Coast Offense differs from traditional offense by emphasizing a short, horizontal passing attack to help stretch out the defense, thus opening up options for longer running plays and longer passes that can achieve greater gains. The West Coast Offense as implemented under Walsh features precisely run pass patterns by the receivers that make up about 65% to 80% of the offensive scheme. With the defense stretched out, the offense is then free to focus the remaining plays on longer throws of more than 14 yards and mid to long yard rushes.

=== Desired outcome ===
Walsh's West Coast Offense attempts to open up running and passing lanes for the backs and receivers to exploit, by causing the defense to concentrate on short passes. Since most down and distance situations can be attacked with a pass or a run, the intent is to make offensive play calling unpredictable and thus keep the defense's play "honest", forcing defenders to be prepared for a multitude of possible offensive plays rather than focusing aggressively on one likely play from the offense.

Beyond the basic principle of passing to set up the run, there are few rules that govern Walsh's West Coast Offense. Originally the offense used two split backs, giving it an uneven alignment in which five players aligned to one side of the ball and four players aligned on the other side (with the quarterback and center directly behind the ball). This imbalance forced defenses to abandon their own favored, conventional formations. Although Walsh-influenced teams now commonly use formations with more or fewer than two backs, the offense's unevenness is still reflected in its pass protection philosophy and continues to distinguish it from single back passing offenses. Throughout the years, coaches have added to, adjusted, modified, simplified, and enhanced Bill Walsh's original adaptation of the Paul Brown offense. Formations and plays vary greatly, as does play calling.

Another key part of the Walsh implementation was "pass first, run later", It was Walsh's intention to gain an early lead by passing the ball, then run the ball on a tired defense late in the game, wearing them down further and running down the clock. The San Francisco 49ers, under both Bill Walsh and George Seifert, often executed this strategy very effectively.

Another key element in Walsh's attack was the three step dropback instead of traditional seven step drops or shotgun formations. The three step drop helped the quarterback get the ball out faster resulting in far fewer sacks. "WCO" plays unfold quicker than in traditional offenses and are usually based on timing routes by the receivers. In this offense the receivers also have reads and change their routes based on the coverages presented to them. The quarterback makes three reads and if no opportunity is available after three reads, the QB will then check off to a back or tight end. Five step and even 7 step dropbacks are now implemented in modern-day WCO's because defensive speed has increased since the 80's. Some modern WCO's have even used shotgun formations (e.g. Green Bay '06-present, Atlanta '04-'06, Philadelphia '04-present).

=== Typical plays ===
The majority of West Coast routes occur within 15 yards of the line of scrimmage. 3-step and 5-step drops by the quarterback take the place of the run and force the opposing defense to commit their focus solely on those intermediate routes. Contrary to popular belief, the offense also uses the 7-step drop for shallow crosses, deep ins and comebacks. For instance, past Michigan Wolverines offenses utilized the 5- and 7-step drops about 85% of the time with West Coast pass schemes implemented by then-quarterbacks coach Scot Loeffler. Because of the speed of modern defenses, only utilizing the 3- and 5-step pass game would be ineffective since the defense could squat and break hard on short-to-intermediate throws with no fear of a down field pass.

The original West Coast Offense of Sid Gillman uses some of the same principles (pass to establish the run, quarterback throws to timed spots), but offensive formations are generally less complicated with more wideouts and motion. The timed spots are often farther down field than in the Walsh-style offense, and the system requires a greater reliance on traditional pocket passing.

Another aspect that makes the West Coast one of the most difficult to master is that it requires a deeper connection between quarterback and receiver, and an ability to communicate mid-play. On any given route, a receiver has as many as three options; a hitch, a slant and a fly, depending on what the defense is showing. The quarterback is responsible for recognizing the defense and the reaction of the receiver to it and adjusting the route if needed. This explains the communication mistakes that commonly occur on West Coast offensive plays where the quarterback throws to a spot that the receiver is running away from.

=== Scripted plays ===
A Walsh innovation was scripting the first 15 offensive plays of the game. Walsh went as far as to script the first 25 plays but most teams stop at 15. Since the offensive team knew that the first 15 plays would be run as scripted no matter what, they could practice those plays to perfection, minimizing mistakes and penalties. By ignoring situational play-calling and increasing the game tempo, scripted plays also served to confuse the defense and induce early penalties. Executing these plays successfully could establish momentum and dictate the flow of the game. It also gave the coaching staff an opportunity to run test plays against the defense to gauge their reactions in game situations. Later in the game, an observed tendency in a certain situation by the opposing defense could be exploited.

== Requirements and disadvantages ==
The West Coast offense requires a quarterback who throws extremely accurately, and often blindly, very close to opposing players. In addition, it requires the quarterback to be able to quickly pick the best one of five receivers to throw to, certainly much more quickly than in previously used systems. Often, the quarterback has no time to think about the play and must act reflexively, executing the play exactly as instructed by the offensive coordinator, who calls the plays for him.

This is in contrast to the roles quarterbacks were required to perform in other systems, which were to be an adept game manager with a strong arm. Many people reasoned that Johnny Unitas, a strong-armed field general would not have fared well in being subservient to the offensive coordinator, and that his long but sometimes wobbly passes would not have worked in the West Coast system. The West Coast offense caused a split still evident today among quarterbacks; those who were more adept at the West Coast style: Joe Montana, Steve Young, Brett Favre, Tom Brady, and Matt Hasselbeck; and those more in tune with the old style: Dan Marino, Jim Kelly, and Peyton Manning. Rich Gannon is a good example of a quarterback who fared better in one system than the other. Gannon struggled in the old style system but found great success with the Oakland Raiders and the West Coast system run by head coaches Jon Gruden and Bill Callahan.

The West Coast offense requires sure-handed receivers who are comfortable catching in heavy traffic, and the system downplays speedy, larger receivers who are covered easily in short yardage situation. One result has been the longevity of receivers in the West Coast system such as Jerry Rice, because familiarity with the system and clear signalling is of greater importance than systems that require a receiver to "stretch the field" where any loss of speed is a major liability. "WCO" systems also rely on agile running backs that catch the ball as often as they run. Roger Craig was a leading receiver for the 49ers for many years and was a 1,000 yard rusher and 1,000 yard receiver in the 1985 season. Finally, receivers must follow precise, complicated routes as opposed to improvisation, making meticulous, intelligent players more valued than independent, pure athletes. Jerry Rice's unique skill-set made him a reliable and durable asset in both Walsh's and Seifert's versions of the West Coast offense, and he was able to break numerous NFL receiving records over the course of his career. Rice, who earned induction into the Pro Football Hall of Fame in 2010, recorded 1,549 receptions, 22,895 receiving yards, and 208 total touchdowns, more than any other NFL player in all three categories.

Another aspect of the West Coast offense is the use of fast running quarterbacks. In blitz or short-yardage situations, many of the West Coast offense's strengths are negated by defenses blocking running and passing lanes. A running quarterback can compensate by acting as a runner himself, paralyzing an overly aggressive defense. Quarterbacks such as Randall Cunningham and Michael Vick have been successful runners in this offense, as well as other notable scrambling quarterbacks such as Jake Plummer, Donovan McNabb, Aaron Rodgers, Russell Wilson and Tyrod Taylor. The west coast offense also utilizes play-action passes to fool the defense in order to get receivers open, which is usually successful with running quarterbacks.

Although not related to the West Coast offense, the similar "dink-and-dunk" offense has also helped quarterbacks that are more adept to older systems. Kurt Warner (a disciple of a variation of Air Coryell) and Ben Roethlisberger (a traditional gunslinger) are notable examples of non-West Coast quarterbacks that found a degree of late-career success in the "dink-and-dunk" system.
