= Shotgun formation =

American football offensive formation

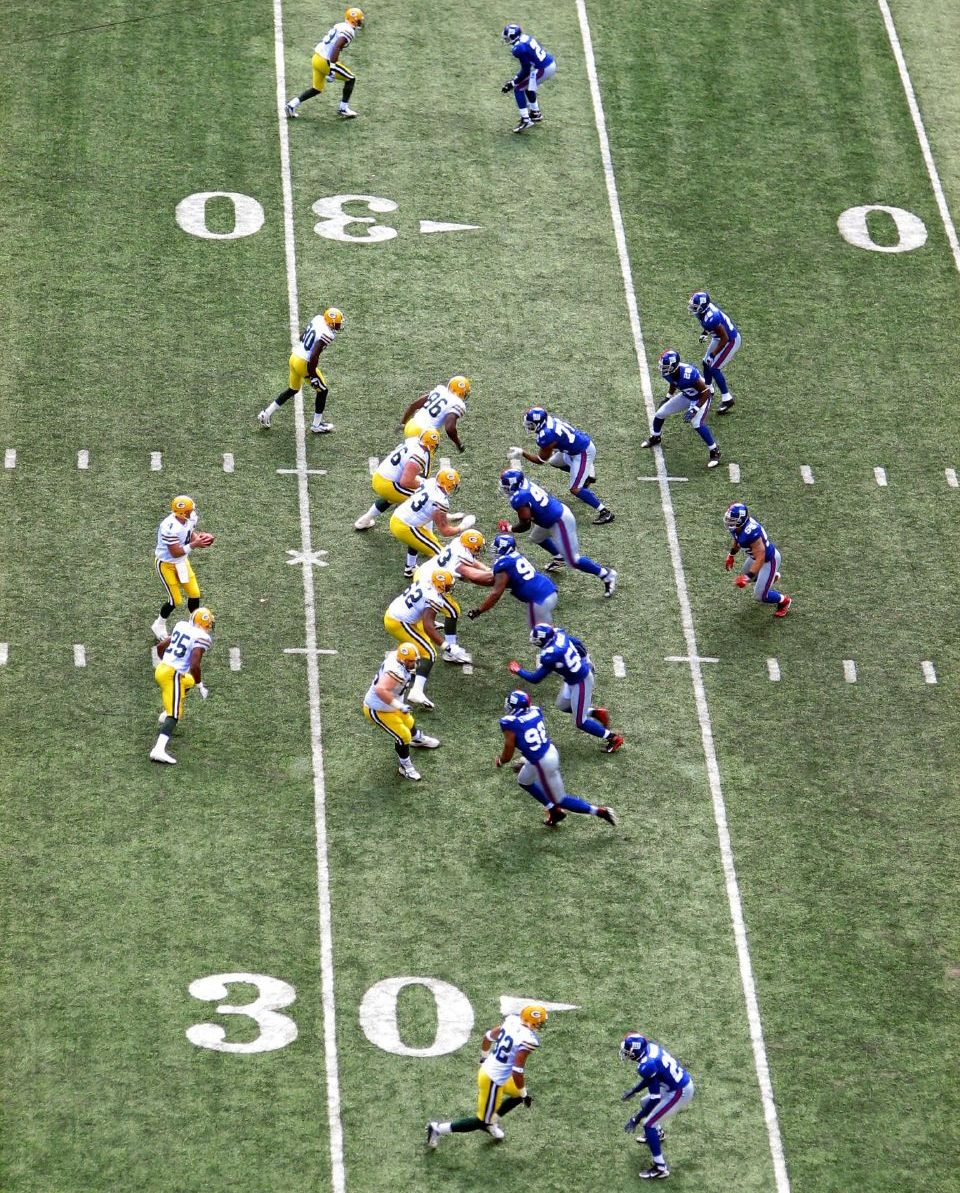
The Green Bay Packers (left) in the shotgun in a game against the New York Giants in 2007

The shotgun formation is a formation used by the offensive team in gridiron football mainly for passing plays, although some teams use it as their base formation. Instead of the quarterback receiving the snap from center at the line of scrimmage, in the shotgun he stands further back, often five to seven yards off the line. Sometimes the quarterback will have a back on one or both sides before the snap, while other times he will be the lone player in the backfield with everyone spread out as receivers.

The shotgun formation can offer certain advantages. The offensive linemen have more room to maneuver behind the scrimmage line and form a tighter, more cohesive oval “pocket” in which the quarterback is protected from “blitzing” by the defense. The quarterback also has a better view of the defense from the shotgun formation. If the quarterback has speed, mobility or both, he can use this formation to scramble before his pass, or to run to an open field position in the defensive secondary or to the sideline, usually gaining first-down yardage.

Although some running plays can be run effectively from the shotgun, the formation also has weaknesses. The defense knows a pass is more than likely coming, particularly from an empty set lacking any running backs, and there is a higher risk of a botched snap than in a simple center/quarterback exchange. If the defense is planning a pass rush, this formation gives fast defensive players more open and exposed targets in the offensive backfield, with less cluttered “blitzing” routes to the quarterback and any other halfback in the offensive backfield.

Shotgun combines elements of the short punt and spread formations — "spread" in that it has receivers spread widely instead of close to or behind the interior line players. The origins of the term are thought to be that it is like a "shotgun" in spraying receivers around the field. (The alignment of the players also suggests the shape of an actual shotgun.) Formations similar or identical to the shotgun used decades previously would be called names such as "spread double wing". Short punt formations (so called because the distance between the snapper and the ostensible punter is shorter than in long punt formation) do not usually have as much emphasis on wide receivers.

A typical Shotgun formation—many variables can be modified, but this is the basic setup many teams use

== History ==
The modern shotgun offense was developed by head coach Red Hickey of the San Francisco 49ers in 1960.

During his time as head coach of the Edmonton Eskimos (1954–1957), Frank "Pop" Ivy, known as an innovator in college football and in the US and Canadian professional leagues, originally created the formation calling it the "lonesome quarterback".

San Francisco 49ers head coach Red Hickey, who systematized the modern shotgun offense in 1960, ultimately renamed the formation the "shotgun". John Brodie was the first National Football League shotgun quarterback, beating out former starter Y. A. Tittle largely because he was mobile enough to effectively run the formation.

The New York Jets briefly experimented with the shotgun during the middle of the Joe Namath era to give the bad-kneed and often immobile quarterback more time to set up plays by placing him deeper in the backfield. Three years before Dallas ushered in the modern era of the shotgun to the NFL, Joe Theismann of the Toronto Argonauts regularly employed the formation north of the border in the Canadian Football League. However, the formation was not used regularly in the NFL until the 1975 season, and then only by the Dallas Cowboys, who used the shotgun frequently with Roger Staubach at quarterback. The Cowboy shotgun differed from the 49er shotgun as Staubach generally had a back next to him in the backfield (making runs possible), where Brodie was normally alone in the backfield.

Since no other NFL teams used the formation during this time, some believed it had been invented by head coach Tom Landry. Instead, Landry simply dusted off the old innovation to address a pressing problem: keeping Staubach protected while an unusually young and inexperienced squad (12 rookies made the 1975 Cowboys roster) jelled. Dallas ended up in the Super Bowl that season, in no small part due to its new use of the old formation. The shotgun became a "signature" formation for the Cowboys, especially during third down situations.

The shotgun was adopted by more teams throughout the pass-happy late 1980s, and was part of almost every team's offense in the 1990s, eventually becoming a base formation for some teams in the late 2000s.

== Recent use ==
In recent years, the shotgun has become vastly prevalent. Many college quarterbacks—such as Tim Tebow, who almost exclusively used the shotgun at Florida—have difficulty adapting to NFL offenses where about a third of snaps are taken under center. However, with the spread offense increasingly used in the NFL, the shotgun is more popular, since the spread allows for more effective running.

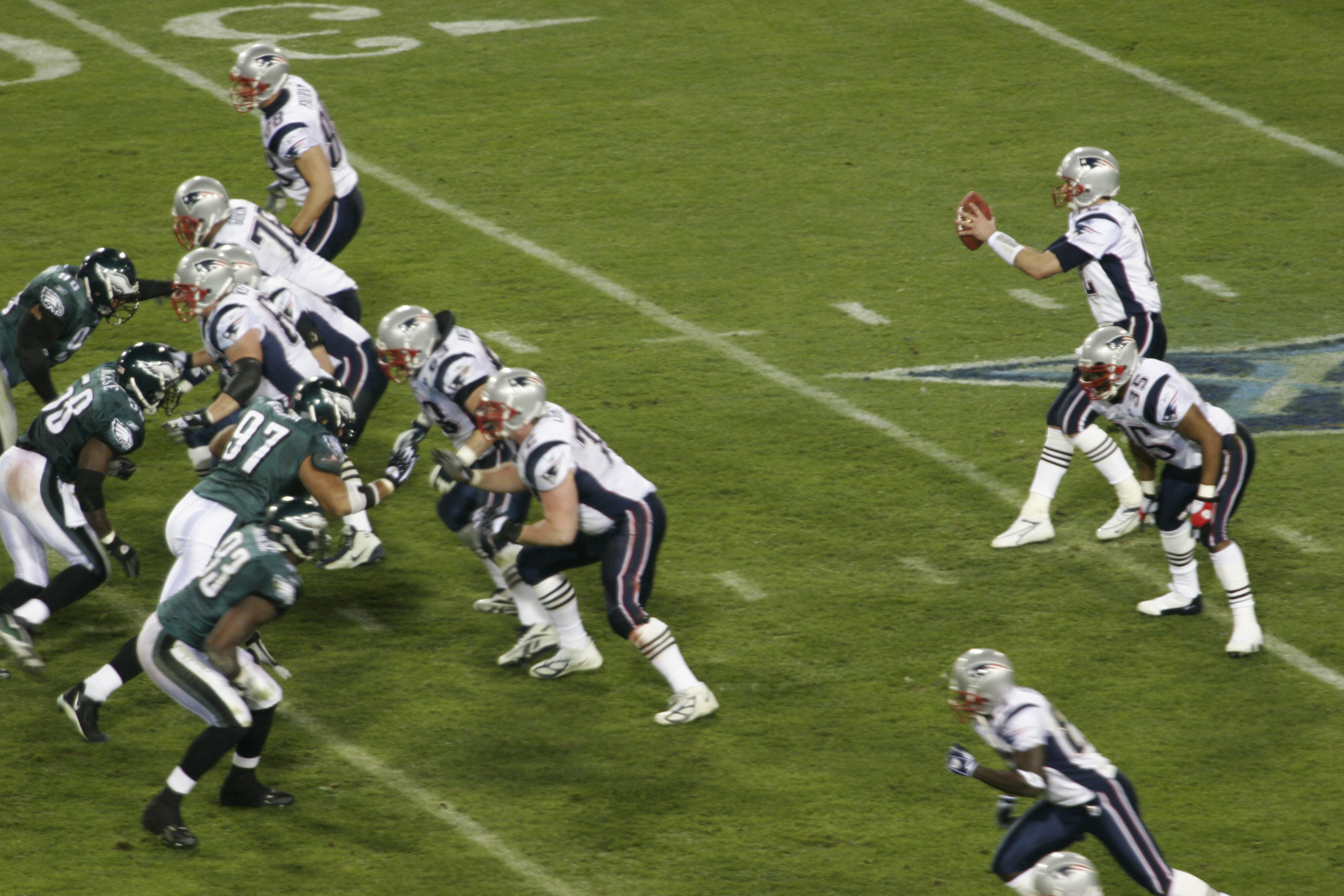
Tom Brady in the shotgun at Super Bowl XXXIX.

The shotgun formation is often run during 2nd-and-long or 3rd-and-long situations to give the quarterback enough time to allow the receivers to run deep routes. However, Peyton Manning, formerly of the Indianapolis Colts and Denver Broncos, often audibled to plays that use this formation in order to better read defenses and to take advantage of fast receivers like Marvin Harrison and Reggie Wayne and gain extended yardage in a single play. In 2007, the New England Patriots used the shotgun with great effectiveness as a base formation for the offense that scored the then-record 587 points in a 16-game season (since broken by the Denver Broncos in 2013); in fact, the 2007 Patriots were the first team in NFL history to use it for the majority of their offensive plays. The Patriots have also used the formation to directly snap the ball away from the quarterback, snapping it instead to a running back (usually Kevin Faulk); the Patriots scored a two-point conversion via such a direct snap to Faulk in Super Bowl XXXVIII and again against the Chargers in the AFC Divisional Playoffs.

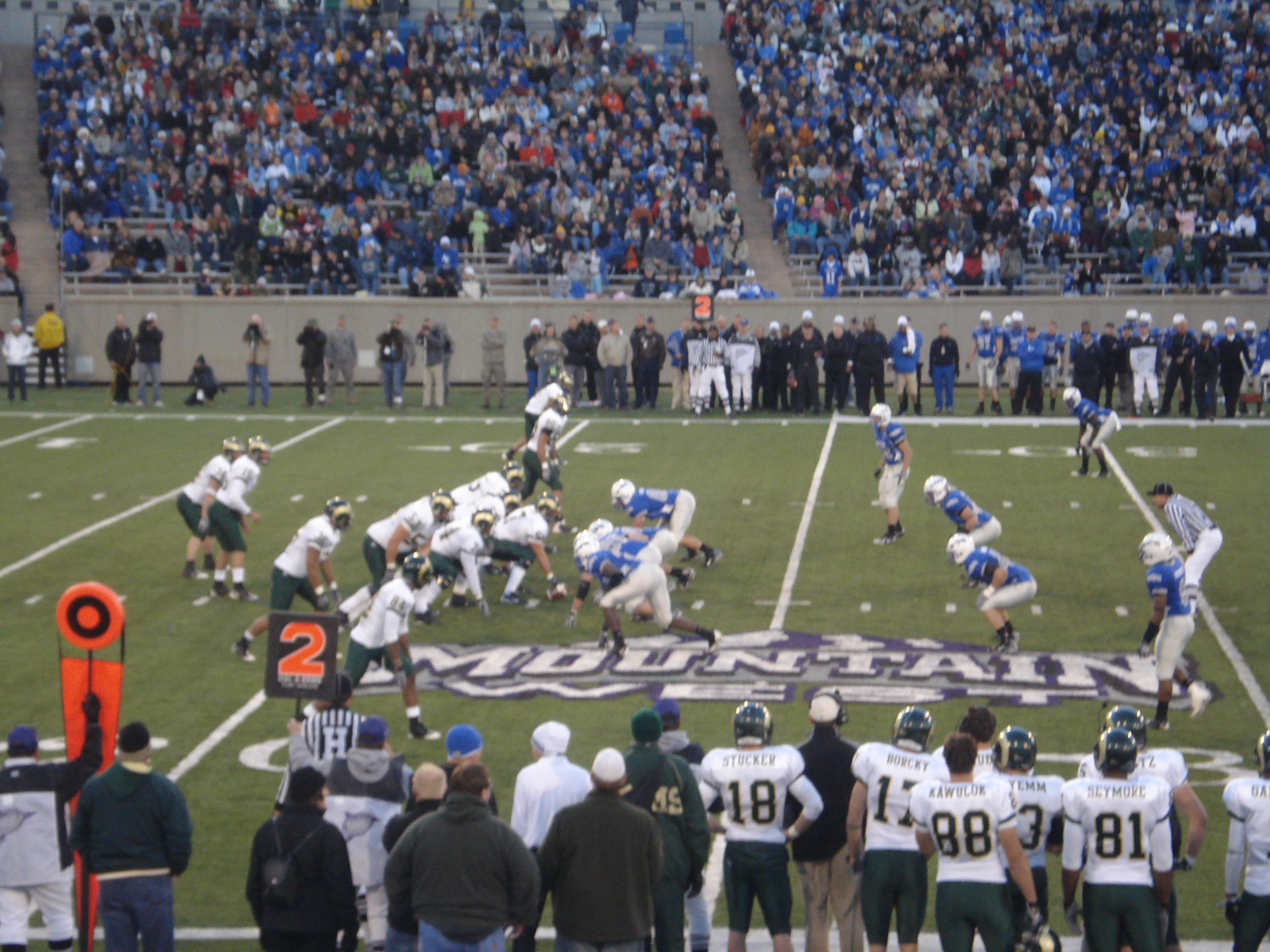
Side view of the shotgun formation

Though the shotgun is a pass-dominated formation, a cleverly designed halfback draw play can put defenses off guard and a fast halfback can get good yardage before the defense recovers from their mistake. A further development of the play is a halfback option pass, with the quarterback being one of the eligible receivers. Roger Staubach's backup and successor, Danny White, twice caught such a pass for a touchdown. It was noted at the time that he was only eligible because of the shotgun formation (an NFL quarterback who takes a snap from underneath the center was and still is an ineligible receiver, a rule not found in any amateur level of American football).

The shotgun is also used in college, but running is used more often than in the NFL. Most offenses in college who run in the shotgun have a fast quarterback. They often use a play where the quarterback has an option of handing the ball off to the running back who runs to the side opposite the side he was lined up on. The quarterback can also run the opposite way depending on how the defense reacts. Urban Meyer and the Florida Gators used this effectively from 2006 to 2009 with Tim Tebow.

== Related formations ==
The Nevada Wolf Pack under coach Chris Ault employed a formation called the "pistol", in which the running back, instead of lining up next to the quarterback, lines up behind the quarterback, who in turn has lined up two to three yards behind the center.

Coach Urban Meyer has added elements of the option offense to the shotgun offense he employed as coach at Bowling Green State University, the University of Utah, and University of Florida. This "spread option" offense is also used by the Missouri Tigers, Ohio State Buckeyes and other college teams with quarterbacks who can run as well as throw effectively.

== Use in Canadian football ==
At times the formation has been more common in Canadian football, which allows only three downs to move ten yards downfield instead of the American game's four. Canadian teams are therefore more likely to find themselves with long yardage to make on the penultimate down, and therefore more likely to line up in the shotgun to increase their opportunities for a large gain. Canadian teams also have the advantage that backs positioned behind the line of scrimmage can run forward and cross the line running as the ball is snapped.

== See also ==
- Football strategy
- Spread offense
- Wildcat
- Pistol offense
