= Power run =

Type of play used in American football

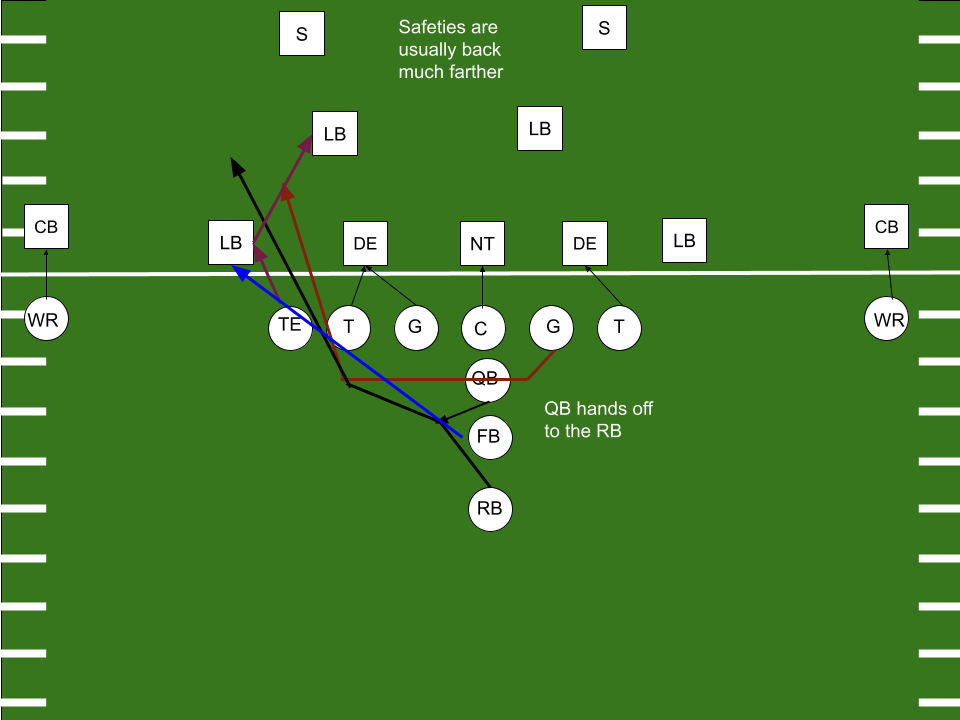
A basic power play in the I-formation. The tight end initially blocks the left outside linebacker until the fullback gets there, then moves to the next linebacker. The right guard pulls and blocks any defensive player in the hole.

In American football, a power run is a running play used out of a variety of offensive formations using two backs (fullback, tailback).

A power run uses two lead blockers: the fullback and the backside offensive guard. A typical blocking scheme for a power run is for the linemen to down block the man in their inside gap. The fullback will kick out (block) the last man on the line of scrimmage (an outside linebacker or wide defensive end) or help on the strong side of the formation and the backside guard will pull and lead up either the guard/tackle hole or the tackle/tight end hole and block the remaining linebacker or defensive back.

The principle of this play is to out-number the defense at the point of attack. The tailback must read the guard's block and run off that. Teams at all levels will use this as a base running play in their offense. This play is typically run out of I-formations.
