= I formation =

American football formation

Standard I formation

The I formation is one of the most common offensive formations in American football. The I formation draws its name from the vertical (as viewed from the opposing endzone) alignment of quarterback, fullback, and running back, particularly when contrasted with the same players' alignments in the T formation.

The formation begins with the usual 5 offensive linemen (2 offensive tackles, 2 guards, and a center), the quarterback under center, and two backs in-line behind the quarterback. The base variant adds a tight end to one side of the line and two wide receivers, one at each end of the line.

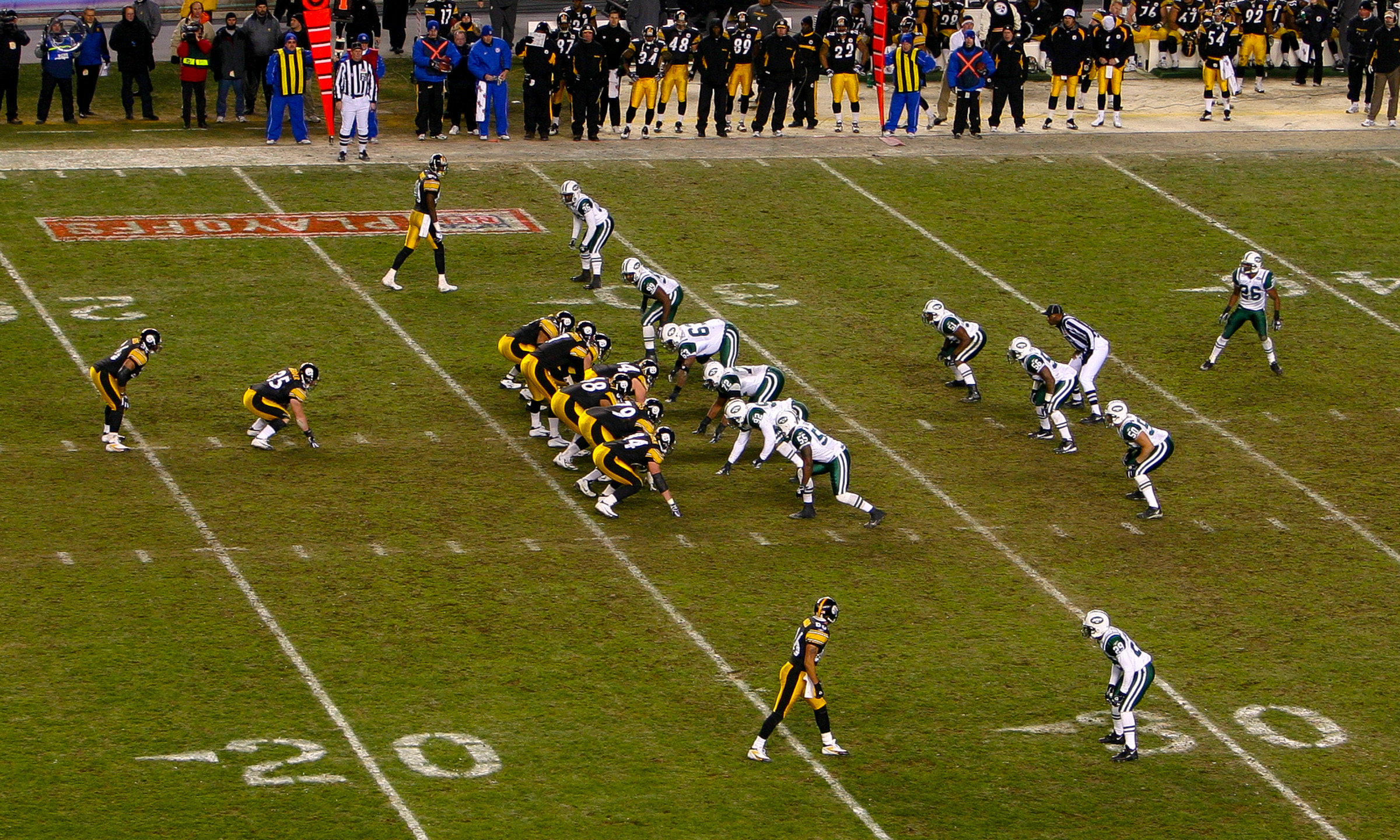
This is an example of an I formation in an NFL game. The Pittsburgh Steelers (black and yellow) are set in the I formation with one tight end and two wide receivers. The New York Jets (white and green) are lined up in a 4-3 defensive formation.

== History ==
The exact origin of the I formation is unclear. Charles M. Hollister of Northwestern in 1900 is one source, as is Bob Zuppke in 1914.

Tom Nugent is credited with developing the I formation at Virginia Military Institute in 1950 as a replacement for the single-wing and an alternative to the T formation. Don Coryell, before popularizing Air Coryell, was also a pioneer of the I and used it as a high school coach in Hawaii, at Wenatchee Valley College in 1955, and at Whittier College in 1957–1959. In 1960, Coryell was an assistant coach under John McKay for the USC Trojans. By 1962, McKay's Trojans won the national title with an offense built on the I. John Madden recalled going to an I formation clinic led by McKay. "We'd go to these clinics, and afterward, everyone would run up to talk to McKay", said Madden. "Coryell was there because he introduced [McKay]. I was thinking, 'If [McKay] learned from him, I'll go talk to [Coryell].'"

Tom Osborne, head coach at Nebraska for a quarter century, further popularized the formation in the early 1970s as offensive coordinator (under head coach Bob Devaney) with consecutive national titles in 1970 and 1971. He incorporated the option into his I formation scheme beginning in 1980, forming the base of the Nebraska offense for over twenty years, and won three national championships in the 1990s. NFL teams followed the success of the I at the college level and adopted it as well.

== Typical roles ==
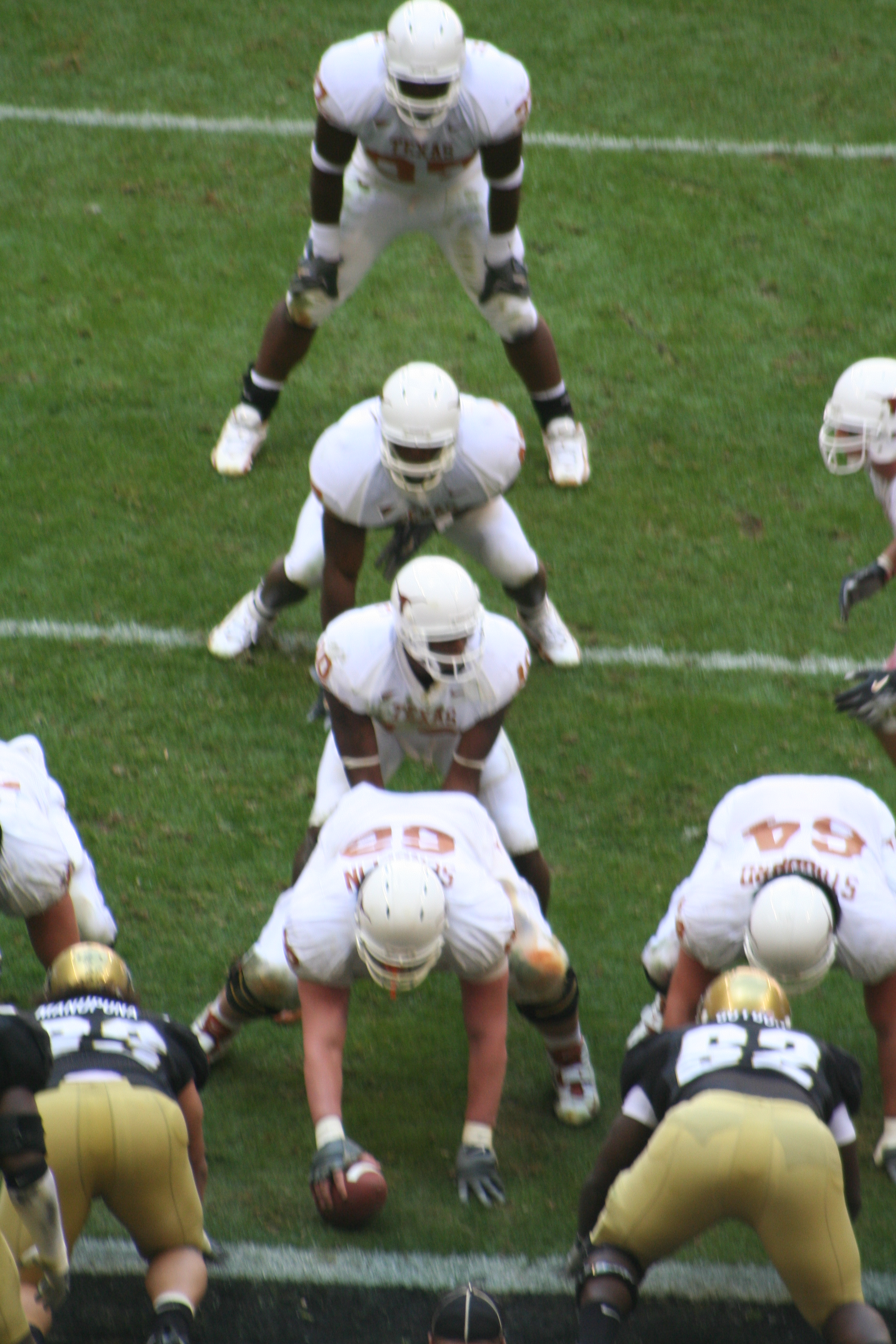
Texas Longhorns in the I formation. From top to bottom: tailback, fullback, quarterback, center

The I formation is typically employed in running situations. In the I formation, the tailback starts six to eight yards behind the scrimmage from an upright position, where he can survey the defense. The formation gives the tailback more opportunities for finding weak points in the defense to run into.

Typically, a fullback fulfills a blocking—rather than rushing or receiving—role in the modern game. With the fullback in the backfield as a blocker, runs can be made to either side of the line with his additional blocking support. This is contrasted with the use of tight ends as blockers; because they are set up at the end of the line, they can only support runs to one side of the line. The fullback can also be used as a feint—the defense can spot him more easily than the running back, so they may be drawn in his direction while the running back takes the ball the opposite way.

Despite the emphasis on the running game, the I formation remains an effective base for a passing attack. The formation supports up to three wide receivers and many running backs serve as an additional receiving threat. While the fullback is rarely a pass receiver, he serves as a capable additional pass blocker that protects the quarterback before the pass. The running threat posed by the formation also lends itself to the play-action pass. The flexible nature of the formation also helps prevent defenses from focusing their attention on either the run or pass.

== Common variations ==
Big I formation variation

Many subtypes of the I formation exist, generally emphasizing the running or passing strengths of the base version.

- The Big I places a tight end on each side of the offensive line (removing a wide receiver). Coupled with the fullback's blocking, this allows two additional blockers for a run in either direction. This is a running-emphasis variant.
- The Power I replaces one wide receiver with a third back (fullback or running back) in the backfield, set up to one side of the fullback. This is a running-emphasis variant.
- The Jumbo or Goal-line formation further extends the Power I or Big I, adding a second tight end and/or third tackle to the line, respectively. This variant has no wide receivers and is all but exclusively a running formation intended to reliably gain minimal yardage, most commonly two yards or less.
  - In Super Bowl X, the Pittsburgh Steelers scored their first touchdown versus the Dallas Cowboys out of this formation when Terry Bradshaw threw to Randy Grossman. Grossman was uncovered in the end zone after the Doomsday Defense followed tackle Gerry Mullins, who reported as an eligible receiver.
- The Three-wide I replaces the tight end with a third wide receiver. This is a passing-emphasis variant.
- The Maryland I (also known as the Stack I or Golden I) is similar to the Power I except that instead of placing the third back to one side of the fullback, the fullback, third back, and tailback line up directly in front of each other (hence the term "Stack"). This is a running-emphasis variant made popular by the Maryland Terrapins football team of the 1950s under Tom Nugent.
- The Tight I is similar to the Maryland I, except that the extra back (tight end) is aligned between the quarterback and fullback in the alignment. The split end and the player who normally lines up as flanker are both aligned on the line of scrimmage split away from the end man on the line of scrimmage. This formation was used by the Kansas City Chiefs in Super Bowl IV against the Minnesota Vikings to create confusion in the Minnesota defense's lining up against the Chiefs offense.
- The I-Bone is a variation of the Power-I in which the third back is lined up between the fullback and tailback, rather than lateral to the fullback. This allows the third back to run the dive or pitch on the triple option, go into motion as a pass receiver, or block for the pitch to the tailback or keeper by the quarterback. This formation generated positive results for Colorado head coach Bill McCartney and offensive coordinator Gerry DiNardo. The Colorado Buffaloes went undefeated in the 1989 regular season, and won the Associated Press national championship in 1990.

The I formation, in any variant, can also be modified as Strong or Weak. This formation is commonly called an Offset I. In either case, the fullback lines up roughly a yard laterally to his usual position. Strong refers to a move towards the TE side of the formation (Primary TE, or flanker's side when in a "big" 2TE set), weak in the opposite direction. These modifications have little effect on expected play call. However, the Offset I allows a fullback to more easily avoid blockers and get out of the backfield to become a receiver.

== In professional football ==
The I formation is less frequently used in the NFL than in college, as the use of the fullback as a blocker has given way to formations with additional tight ends and wide receivers, who may be called on to block during running plays. The increasingly common ace formation replaces the fullback with an additional receiver, who lines up along the line of scrimmage. The I formation is typically used in short-yardage and goal line situations. College football commonly uses a spread offense, which eliminates the need of a fullback. A spread offense is designed to "spread" the defense across the entirety of the field.

== See also ==
- American football strategy
