= Pro set =

American football offensive formation

The base pro set formation with a split end (WR to left of formation), a flanker (WR on right of formation), a quarterback(QB), a fullback (FB), a halfback (HB), a tight end (TE), and five down linemen (OL).

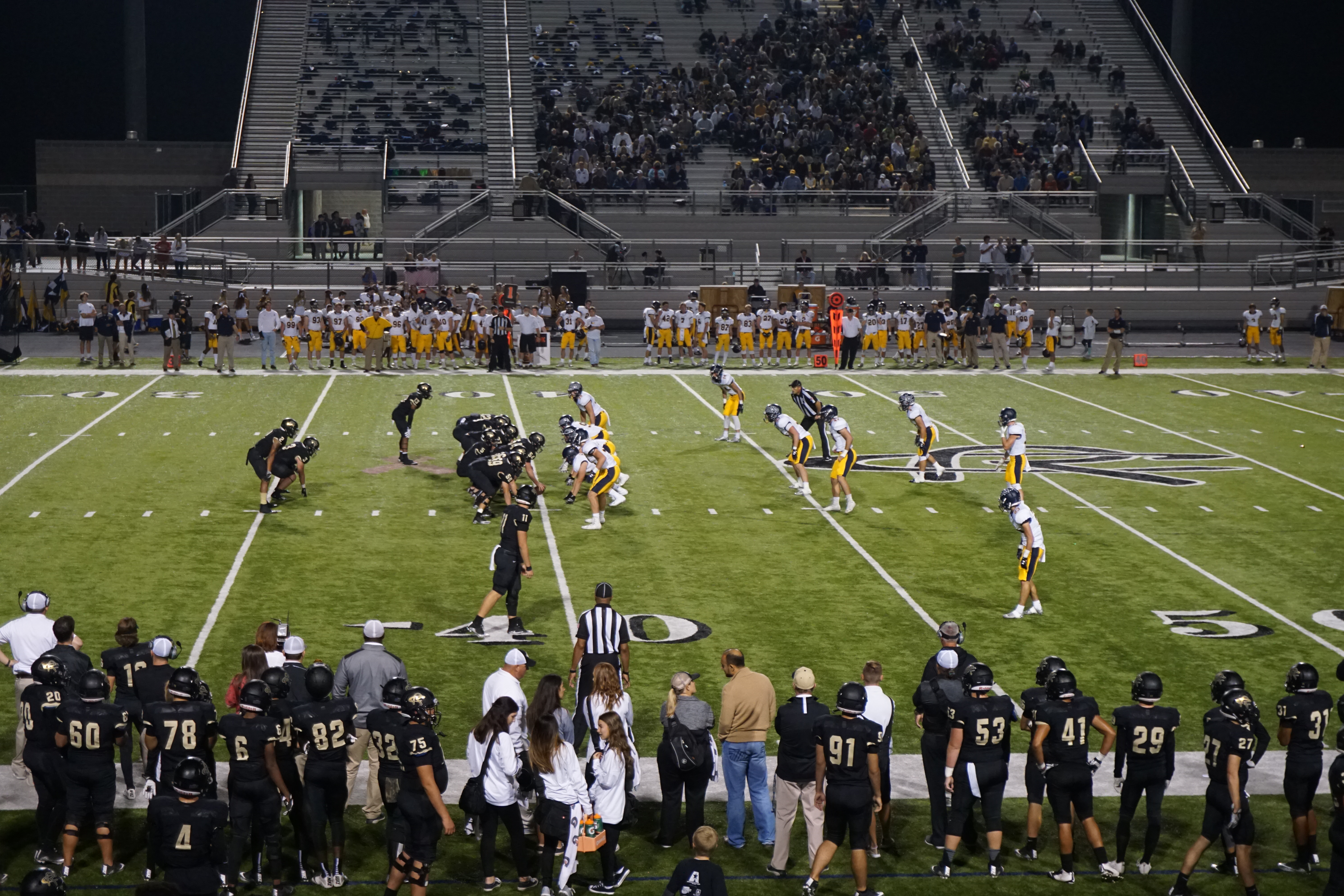
Royse City High School running the pro set against Highland Park

In American football, the pro set or split backs formation is a formation that has been commonly used as a "base" set by professional and amateur teams. The "pro set" formation features an offensive backfield that deploys two running backs aligned side-by-side instead of one in front of the other as in traditional I-formation sets. It was an outgrowth of the three-running-back T-formation, with the third running back (one of the halfbacks) in the T becoming a permanent flanker, now referred to as a wide receiver.

This formation has been particularly popular because teams can both run and pass the football out of it with an equal amount of success. It keeps defenses guessing what type of play the offense will run. Because the backs are opposite each other, it takes the defense longer to read the gap through which the offense will run the ball.

== Overview ==
The set can be run with a single tight end and two receivers or no tight ends and three receivers.

A standard pro set places the backs about 5 yards behind the line of scrimmage, spaced evenly behind the guards or tackles. In this look, teams may utilize two halfbacks, or one halfback and one fullback.

A variation of the pro set places the backs offset toward either side. This look is almost universally used with one fullback and one halfback. The backs line up closer to the line of scrimmage than in a standard pro set, about 3 yards deep. The fullback lines up directly behind the quarterback, in the same spot as in the I-Formation. The halfback then lines up behind either the left or right tackle.

Once the run has been established, it can be a dangerous formation. Because of the real threat of a team running out of the pro-set, defenses must respect the play fake and play run. This pulls the safety to the line and opens up the middle of the field deep. Also, with both backs in position to "pick up" an outside blitz, the pro set gives a quarterback an abundance of time to find an open receiver.

== History ==
The formation has lost its popularity at the college and professional level recently with the rise of shotgun split back formations. It remains common at the high school level.

In the National Football League, in the mid-to-late 2000s, the formation was used almost exclusively by West Coast offense-based teams in occasional third down passing situations and goal-line situations. In the early 2010s, the pro set almost completely disappeared from the NFL, however in the late 2010s it was used once again as an occasional goal line and passing down formation by West Coast offense based teams. Andy Reid recently used the Pro Set in Super Bowl LVII against the Eagles late in the 4th quarter, which led to a game leading field goal.
