= Single set back =

American football offensive formation

A typical Single set back formation, many variables can be implemented, but this is the basic setup teams use

Single set back (also known as the "Lone Setback" or "Singleback" or "Ace" formation or "Oneback" or "Solo") is an offensive base formation in American football which requires only one running back (usually a halfback) lined up about five yards behind the quarterback. There are many variations on single back formations including two tight ends and two wide receivers, one tight end/three wide receivers, etc. The running back can line up directly behind the quarterback or offset either the weak side (away from the tight end) or the strong side (towards the tight end).

== Use in the NFL ==
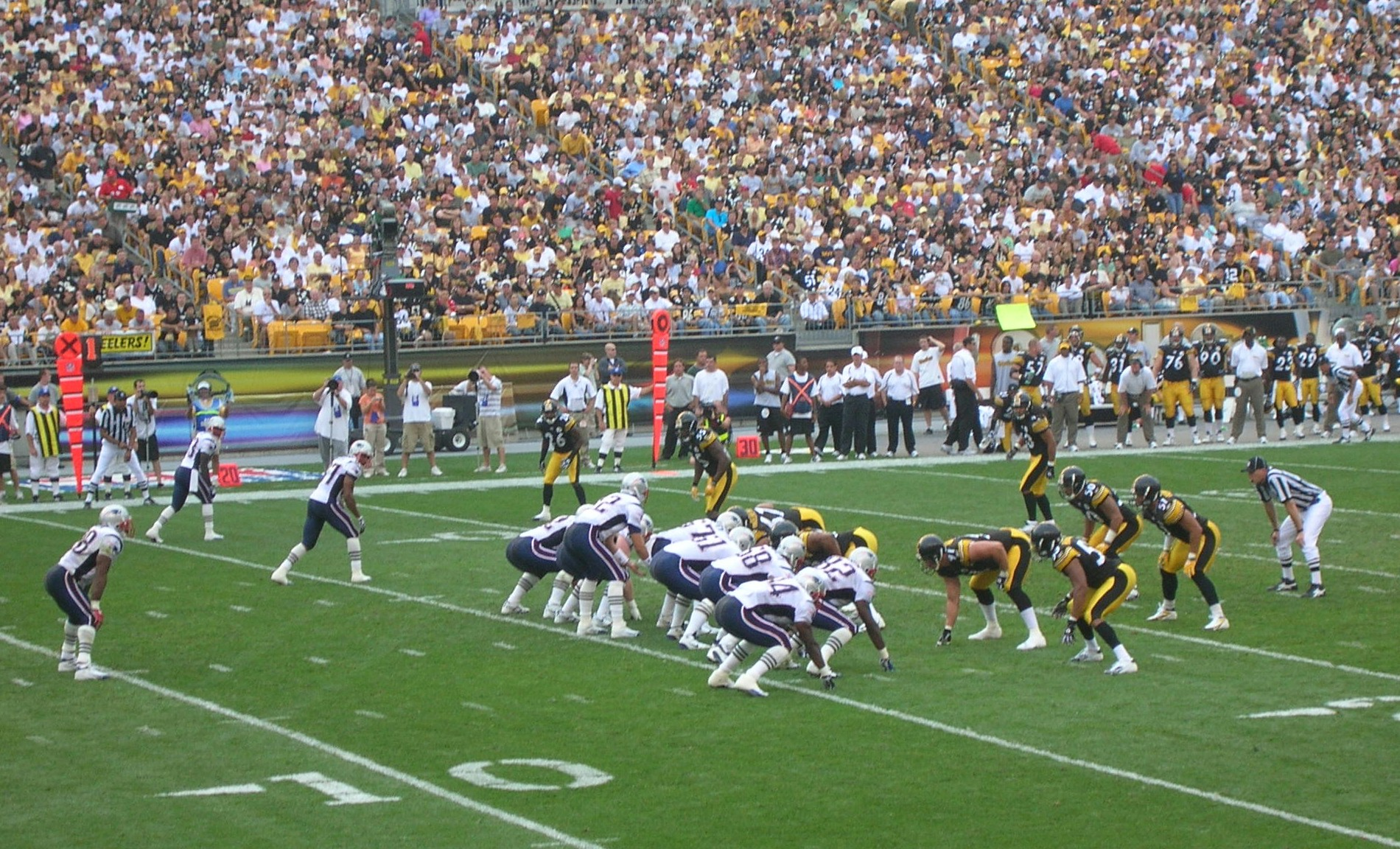
The New England Patriots in a standard singleback formation against the Steelers in 2005. Notice running back Corey Dillon (#28) lined up 7 yards behind quarterback Tom Brady, who is under center.

The then Washington Redskins (now Washington Commanders) coach Joe Gibbs first began using the single-back as a base offense in order to move defenders off the line of scrimmage. He found that having an extra receiver on the line forced defenses to choose their poison by either defending the pass or the run because they were not able to focus on both at once using the number of personnel that they had on the field. He also then began utilizing sets of two tight ends as blockers mainly to protect his quarterbacks from Lawrence Taylor. He believed having an extra blocker on the line would make it easier to keep Taylor out of his backfield. By using different formations and motion before the ball was snapped, he also found that he could confuse defenders on whether the play would be a pass or a run.

This formation has gained popularity in the NFL as teams have started trading out a fullback, or blocking back, in favor of another wide receiver or tight end who is usually faster and better able to receive the ball, while still helping the run game with down-field blocks. The effectiveness of the formation is further increased if the team has athletic tight ends with good pass catching abilities, thereby increasing the versatility of the formation. It is, moreover, good for bootlegs and reverses.

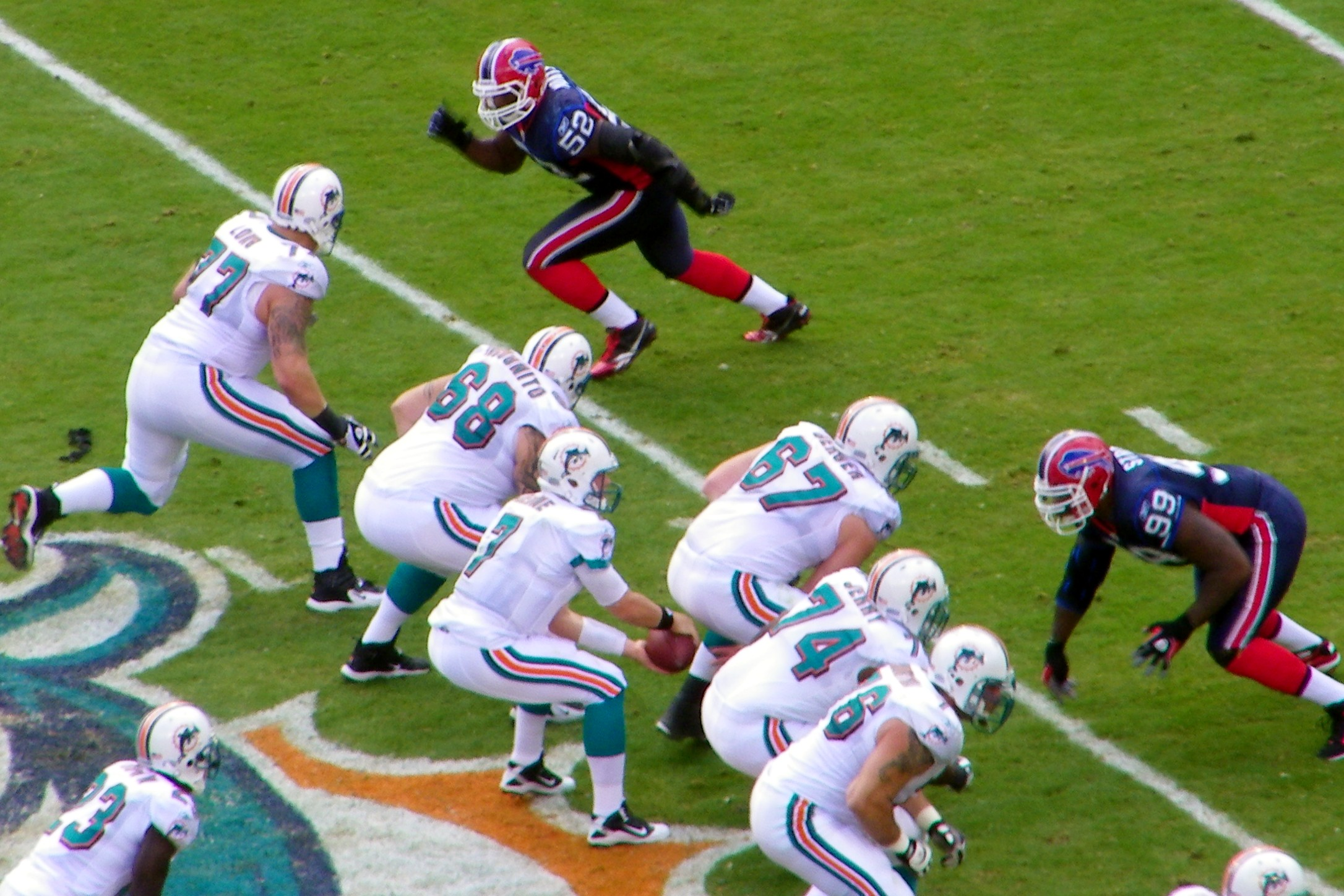
The Miami Dolphins lined up in an offset singleback set vs the Bills in 2010. Notice running back Ronnie Brown (#23) lined up behind the right tackle instead of directly behind quarterback Chad Henne. Brown is also only 4 yards deep in the backfield when offset, as opposed to 7 yards normally.

A nearly obsolete variant is the offset singleback set, in which the running back is offset behind a tackle or a guard. In this look, the running back would usually be closer to the line of scrimmage than in a standard singleback look (3-5 yards as opposed to 5-7 yards). This generally would be on 3rd downs or other passing downs, with the back aligned to the side of the defender he was assigned to block. However, the back could also catch a pass or take a handoff, using mechanics similar to that of the pro set. As shotgun became more popular, teams began utilizing this back placement with the quarterback in the shotgun instead of under center. In shotgun singleback, the running back therefore stands about the same distance from the line of scrimmage as his quarterback. However, traditional offset singleback formations are still run on rare occasions, nearly always in passing situations.

Single-back offenses have gained popularity due to zone blocking and advanced defenses. There are several combinations of single back formations that are used in Division 1 and NFL football. Speed offenses will use single back because the defense still has to respect the run out of these formations since you can line up many tight ends and still have a down field passing game. Single back offenses create match-up problems in the defense. Linebackers will often have to cover receivers in passing routes while defensive safeties are used more to come up and stop the run on the line of scrimmage. Teams that run a single-back offense typically rely on quick receivers that run great routes, balanced tight ends (blocking/receiving), intelligent, shifty running backs, fast and intelligent offensive linemen, and a quarterback that can read defenses and make safe throws under pressure. Single-back offenses are more common in the NFL than in college or high school.
