= History of American football positions =

Changes in the rules of the American sport

American football positions have slowly evolved over the history of the sport. From its origins in early rugby football to the modern game, the names and roles of various positions have changed greatly, some positions no longer exist, and others have been created to fill new roles.

== Origins in rugby ==
Being variants of 19th century rugby football, American and Canadian football position nomenclature has its origin there. Early rugby did no more than distinguish in tactics between the great bulk of the players who played as forwards, and the relative few who played back defensively as "tends", as in goaltenders. After a while, the attacking or at least counterattacking possibilities of playing close behind the scrimmage (which later came to be called "scrummage") came to be recognized, and some players stationed themselves between the forwards and tend as "half-tends". It was seen that the players outside scrimmage (the "pack", i.e. the forwards) were not limited to a defensive role, the tends and half-tends were renamed "back" and "half back" positions.

As the game advanced, backs positioned at different depths (i.e. distances behind the forwards) were further differentiated into separate positions. These positions were called halfback, three-quarters back, and full back according to English and Scottish nomenclature and quarterback, halfback, and full back in the Irish nomenclature. In rugby the English-Scottish nomenclature was eventually adopted worldwide, with the word, "back", often omitted for brevity from the half-back ("half") and three-quarters back ("three quarter") names, and "fullback" as a single word.

In some systems, "five-eighths back" was added. (The illustration here, of singular forms, should not be construed as indicating the number of players in any of those positions, nor is the fraction in the name at all proportional to the actual depth of the position; they indicate only a form of ordinal number, not cardinality.) Having the backs at different depths facilitates passing movements in which the ball is tossed from one player to (usually) the next closest, such that each back receiving the ball, in turn, can be running forward and yet not ahead of the player who threw it, since forward passing of the ball is illegal. Because of the involvement of the 3/4 backs, such a movement is often called a three-quarters movement.

It was the Irish nomenclature of quarter back, half back, and full back that came to North America for use in what was to become the dominant native form of football. The terms became hyphenated and eventually unhyphenated single words, "quarterback" (QB), "halfback" (HB), and "fullback" (FB). The lack of quarterback in the English-Scottish nomenclature for rugby led to the position name "scrum-half" to distinguish the halfback playing close to scrimmage (renamed "scrummage" or "scrum") from another who would "stand off" from it or "fly" away—the "stand-off" or "fly-half".

== Early Canadian football ==
Around 1900, at the same time, the number of players on a Canadian football team was reduced to 14, and the number of players in scrimmage (formerly packing all the forwards) was fixed at three per team. It became customary for six to eight of the other players to continue as what might be known in rugby as loose (non-packing, i.e. not binding together) forwards who in Canadian football formed "winglines" on either side of the scrimmage. In scrimmage, each team had one centre scrimmager flanked by two side scrimmagers. The side scrimmager is bound with hands and arms to their centre scrimmager. The centre scrimmager of the side entitled (and required) to do so would put the ball down in front of him for play-by scrimmage, while both sets of three bodies each ("formed into one compact body" as the rules specified) were crouched and shoving forward at each other, probably meeting at the shoulders as do the front row of forwards in rugby's set scrummage. Depending on the rules, details of the time for the particular circuit of Canadian football clubs, the centre scrimmagers would either contend with their feet for the ball, or one would be entitled to foot it first (usually heeling it back), while the other teams would try to spoil the ball's delivery.

The backfield of three to five players continued to use the nomenclature (see above) of quarterback, halfback, and fullback, and sometimes included one or two flying wings. When six played on the winglines, their positions were called "inside wing", "middle wing", and "outside wing", arrayed in order away from the scrimmage. An additional player called "flying wing" could "fly", between a position on the wingline outside the outside wing, and the backfield.

However, the 14-a-side game's rules never required certain numbers of players in either the winglines or the backfield.

With the later reduction in sides from 14 to 12 players, and introduction of the thrown snap (not footed) snap, the positions of the three scrimmagers were replaced by a single position called "snap". The position names in the winglines were retained for a while but eventually replaced by the American nomenclature, although it was not until the 1960s, that Canadian rules required seven players on the offensive line, unless they were playing short handed. Before that, only five were required on plays in which no forward pass was thrown, so it is likely that in such situations, one or both ends were replaced by or became a back. "Snap" became "centre" and considered a wingline or line position. "Centre" even became the rule book designation of the snapper, although as in the American version, there is no necessity that the player who snaps the ball have equal numbers of teammates flanking him or her on the line.

== More position names ==
A tendency was seen, from early on, for players to keep their position names even when playing out of that position. For instance, before the minimum number of players on the offensive line was fixed at seven when players who would otherwise be in the line as guards or tackles played from offensive backfield positions, the formation was known as a "guard(s) back" or "tackle(s) back" formation.

Meanwhile, another position name was introduced. Players were placed in the offensive backfield just outside their ends, in a position that came to be called "wingback" (WB). Formations with one or two wingbacks came to be called single- or double-wing formations.

Over time, the typically fast back who played fullback, on offense and defense, was replaced by a heavier one who presented a greater threat to run with the ball more or less straight ahead, and to tackle his opponent trying to do the same. For this purpose, the player tended to be placed closer to the line than previously—often as far forward as the halfbacks (the offensive backs then forming a letter T, sometimes called a "straight T", later to distinguish it from slight variants wherein other backs did not form a line perpendicular to that from the quarterback) or even farther forward. But the position kept being called "fullback". On defense, this necessitated another position name for the fastback who played farthest back. The phrase "goal-tend" was used for a time near the start of the 20th century before settling upon "safety man" or simply "safety" (S), representing the last defense against a breakaway play, and the position from which to field opposing kicks. Approximately, on defense, the quarterback and fullback exchanged positions from what they'd been playing on offense, and the quarterback became the safety.

Still, when at the beginning of the 20th century, a penalty was introduced for hitting the opposing kicker after a kick, the foul was at first called "running into the fullback", inasmuch as the deepest back usually did the kicking.

Confusion increased when the legalization of the forward pass made it more advisable for teams to defend with fewer on the line of scrimmage and more behind. Although the offense could no longer play "guard back", for instance, the defense had no such limitations. A common defensive formation was the 6-2-3 or 6-2-2-1, shown below arrayed against an offense's straight T:

               S
HB                             HB
         C           FB
____E_  T__ _G ____G_   T _ E____
    E   T   G   C   G   T   E
               QB
        HB     FB     HB

The so-called center and fullback are playing left and right versions of the same position. The positions were later renamed "linebacker". However, that did not become the usual way to name that position until platoon football became common, with players specializing in offense or defense, substituted according to which team has the ball. There seems to have been some tendency for defensive positions to be named for where the player would play on offense, although quarterback and safety formed an early exception.

When linebackers are playing close to or level with the line, a somewhat reliable way to distinguish them from line players is that the defensive line players will be in a three- or four-point stance, meaning that they will be supported by one or both hands, in addition to feet on the ground, while the linebackers will have only feet on the ground. Line players with one or both hands on the ground are called "down linemen"; typically all defensive linemen are so positioned.

Alternate position naming schemes for an offensive formation are illustrated below in a version of a single-wing formation:

E     G   C   G   T   T   E                QB
HB              HB        FB

E     T   C   G   G   T   E                QB
FB              WB        TB

In the top illustration the center is flanked by guards in the 4-2 unbalanced line (four players on one side, the "strong side" of the center, two on the other, "weak", side) as in a balanced line, leaving the tackles together. In the bottom illustration, the guards are kept "inside" by being next to each other. The end positions are fixed by rule, because "end" is a rule book term.

As to the backfield, the top illustration preserves the principle of the names, reflecting distance from the line. However, the bottom illustration needs further explanation, having eliminated the halfbacks and introduced a new position name, "tailback" (TB). Wingback has been described above, but the "WB" in the above illustration is deeper back than that position name would seem to warrant. That is because this is a "wingback deep" version of the single wing, and the position is named wingback because the player is named for his true wingback position as it exists in other versions. In this version the player may stand as deep as any other back, but there has been a reluctance to identify formations in American football as having more than one fullback (or tailback—see below), although two-fullback systems were not uncommon at one time in rugby.

If the wingback were playing in a true wingback position but named halfback, then the other "halfback" would be playing deeper and thus deserve the name fullback. Another justification is that the player positioned as the left halfback in the top illustration tends to have the fullback characteristics described above. But rather than call the faster, lighter back behind (and in this formation, to the left of) him a halfback and so contradict the distance-back-determines-the-name principle (and rather than add rugby's three-quarters back), we call that player "tailback"—the tail of the formation, farther back than the fullback. Even when two players positioned to take a thrown snap in a single wing formation are level with each other (i.e. at equal depth), the faster one (usually playing weak side) is often called the tailback and the more massive one the fullback.

The quarterback in this formation is not in position to receive the snap. ASCII art (letter diagrams) cannot show this fine a detail, but a quarterback in position to take a handed snap is allowed by rule to stand farther forward, in a place which would otherwise cause illegal confusion as to whether the player was in the backfield or the line. However, the popularity of thrown-snap formations from about 1920 to about 1950 (and the illegality of the handed snap in Canadian football when snapping by hand rather than foot was first prescribed in that game) induced some teams to place the quarterback a little farther back, receiving the snap via a short toss.

When the left end is a little farther from the nearest other line player of the same team than is the right end, such a slight additional gap is said to be "flexing" that end, but does not produce an additional position name. However, when the gap is considerably greater, that is said to be a "split end" (SE). That produced a position name when on offense a team played with one end split and the other not split—a "tight end" (TE). The split end being specialized for going downfield to catch forward passes, it becomes more useful to differentiate the split from the tight end than between left and right end.

Instead of wingbacks or conventionally placed halfbacks, an offensive team could have backs positioned wide of the rest of the formation, similarly to a split end, to be pass receivers. Such a back would be called a "flankerback" or "flanker" (FL).

A more straightforward use of the position name, "tailback", is shown below in an offensive short punt formation, whose use, despite its name, is not confined to punting. The line shown is balanced with one split end. In such a case, the side with the tight end is sometimes said to be the strong side of the line, and hence of the formation, because the tight end is better placed than the split end to block, especially on running plays. An additional justification for calling that the strong side in the example below is that the backfield has more players on that side, although that will not always be the case, and in this case the positioning of backs does not produce strikingly strong and weak sides, as opposed to the single wing formation shown above.

SE                     T  G  C  G  T  TE                                QB                         HB                                HB                             TB

If the deepest back were a specialist in punting, one might substitute "P" for "punter" for the "TB" above.

== Age of confusion ==
The trend of naming offensive positions for the role or build of player in it continued. In some cases, this obfuscates important details. A recent diagram of a short punt formation for offense in youth football had no quarterback, but two fullbacks at the depth of the QB shown above, and a halfback at the position labeled FB above. Some discussions of the single wing previously diagrammed claim it has no quarterback. And many is the time when a player in the farthest back position, in a formation similar to the short punt shown above, is referred to as quarterback! Position names no longer needed to reflect any given player's combined roles on offense and defense when few played both ways. As a result, position naming on defense has become less confusing and more informative. However, position naming on offense, while tending to eliminate obsolete distinctions, has also tended to hide important ones and confuse others.

Offenses and defenses continued to adapt to the increases in forward passing favored by the rules. Below is diagrammed a 3-4-4 (or simply "3-4") defensive formation and an offensive formation it might line up against across the lines of scrimmage, as popular beginning in later portions of the 20th century:

                  FS          SSCB                                                 CB             OLB     ILB     ILB     OLB__________________E_______NT______E___________________WR                T   G   C   G   T   TE                          QB                        WR                       RB   RB

Beginning with the defensive line, one notices a slight departure from previous nomenclature with the position labeled "NT". Why not simply "T"? The superfluous designator "middle" when the defense was playing with an odd number on the line less than seven, as in "middle guard", was discussed above. (This invites the unanswered question of whether, if the defense has an eight-player line, it includes a "left center" and "right center".) "NT" stands for "nose tackle", "nose" having been introduced with guards to indicate a position "on the nose" of the opposing center, although "nose guard" had not been a popular term, probably because it suggested a piece of protective equipment. There is justification for the extra word, in that the tackle in a 3-player defensive line could well play off center; however, this distinction is not maintained with teams using such a tactic, so the position could and probably should be referred to simply as "tackle"—or "defensive tackle" (DT) in a player roster (see below).

The linebacker (LB) positions are straightforwardly distinguished as inside (ILB) and outside (OLB). When there are only three linebackers, the one inside is labeled middle linebacker (MLB), and the outside positions can instead be named as left and right. The defense's halfbacks have been renamed cornerbacks (CB), a fitting term given that they play at the edges or "corners". The term has no spurious indicator of the depth at which they are positioned in the defensive backfield.

Finally there are shown two safeties. In this case they are distinguished as "free safety" (FS)—also known as "weak safety"—and "strong safety" (SS). The strong safety is on the side following the strong (tight end) side of the balanced offensive line (see above), and has responsibility for covering (guarding as a pass receiver) the TE, while the free safety has no such coverage assignment. However, the coverage played by defense does not always easily allow assignment of such distinct names for safeties. A formation with more than two safeties could have them described by their relative geometric placement—outside, shallow, deep, etc.-but such is not general practice; however, see the discussion of the "nickel" below.

The offense is diagrammed in what was for some time referred to as a "pro set"-- "set" indicating that the players are stationary, although one back may go in motion from it. This particular version is said to have a "deuce", "flank" backfield. From the description above of the straight T, this formation can be seen to be derived by splitting one end and moving the halfback on the opposite side to a flanker position. Instead of "SE" and "FL" for those positions, however, we see "WR", for "wide receiver".

In the 1960s, teams would distinguish between split ends (e.g. the New York Jets professional football club's George Sauer) and flankers (e.g. his teammate, Don Maynard) on their player rosters. For a relatively brief period, game rules had been adopted in some codes, requiring different uniform numbers for line players from those of backs, and the position naming distinction carried on for a while after the rules were amended to require only certain sets of numbers for ineligible and eligible receivers of forward passes. It became commonplace for ends to shift into backfield positions and vice versa. By the 1970s, the common practice changed to refer to flankers and split ends both as wide receivers or, more colloquially, "wideouts"—they play from wide of the rest of the formation.

The playing rules still distinguish between ends and backs on offense. There are differences as to the motions, the players in those positions are allowed to make, during and preparatory to their team's snapping the ball. At the time they snap the ball, the team is required to have seven players (minus any number their side is playing short in Canadian football) on their line of scrimmage, which includes split or tight ends, but not flankers or wingbacks.

Meanwhile, the distinction between fullback and halfback was erased, each replaced by "running back" (RB). That term became popular during the 1960s as well, although even into the 1970s, some playing the pro set kept the HB-FB distinction. So, for instance, in the flank formation shown above, those positions were named as in the straight T, while in the "split" version of the deuce backfield, the fullback occupied the other halfback position shown in the straight T. The distinction referred to the build of the players, the fullback being a stronger runner more or less straight ahead, and the halfback faster to attack the defense's flanks. However, on many teams there was no strong distinction between those backs, and since their major role was running with the ball, "running back" was most descriptive without maintaining a spurious geometric connotation that'd become outmoded by their lining up in different depth relationships.

Alternative names for RBs are "deep backs" and "setbacks", although the latter is disfavored because it has also been used for backs in general, both on offense and defense. There is, moreover, a generic term for the deeper-playing backs (CB & S) on defense: "defensive back" (DB), appropriately enough. The term excludes the linebackers, even though they be backs in the traditional sense because they are usually not on their team's line of scrimmage. There also exist the generic terms "defensive lineman" (DL) and "offensive lineman" (OL), although the latter refers only to the interior linemen, excluding the ends because of their eligibility to receive forward passes.

However, to this day many teams maintain the offense's fullback-halfback distinction, especially in "full house" backfields, i.e. those with a quarterback and three running backs, that is, no backs playing wider as wingbacks or flankers. This is confusing enough, when the fullback plays slightly forward of the halfbacks, as in the Y formation shown below, later used to run the wishbone system (the backs forming a letter Y or a resemblance to a wishbone):

E         T  G  C  G  T           E                QB                FB             HB    HB

At least, that one is an easy enough derivation to visualize from the original diamond, with the depth of the fullback inverted with respect to the halves. However, some formations have placed the heavy back even more starkly forward, to function as a blocker for the running backs. In the diagram below of the V formation used by Dartmouth College in the 1950s, the respective position names have been rationalized as "BB" (a not-very-popular designation, "blocking back") and RB:

E  T  G  C  G  T  E         QB  BB                   RB        RB

(The running and blocking backs can be seen to form a letter V.) However, in its time the running backs were known as halfbacks and the blocking back as fullback. Another such example is the I formation, shown below in a with-wingback version:

WR                T  G  C  G  T  TE               WB       QB                        FB                        TB

The diagram shows the more geometrically rational designation of tailback behind the fullback. However, some would label the deepest back in this form of deuce backfield "HB", considering one halfback to have moved behind the fullback, who is in both the role of blocking back and the heavy up-the-middle runner. Those who would emphasize the blocking role of the FB (the "up back") might even label the deepest back, "RB", with a BB instead of FB. Few, however, would use the straightforwardly geometric labels of QB, HB, and FB in that order from front to back.

The wingback is on the wing of a tackle rather than an end. This is accepted nomenclature where an end is split ("WR" above). The wingback is just behind and outside of the "interior lineman" (line player other than end). However, it is not uncommon for a wingback to be outside the tight end in an I or other formation where the opposite end is split.

In the power I formation, instead of the wingback shown above, there is another deep back in the traditional halfback position. That position in the power I is probably called "halfback" more than any other name. In the triple I, where all the backs are in one line perpendicular to the lines of scrimmage, one could hope for the backs to be called quarter-, half-, full-, and tailback in order of depth, but various names are probably used.

The diagram below of an "ace" formation deliberately mixes terms/symbols for wide receivers:

E              T  G  C  G  T                WR      SB             QB            WR                 RB

On the left are represented the more traditional and descriptive terms "end" and "slotback" (SB). The latter is for a position that would be labeled "FL", except that the back is in a "slot" between tackle and end (instead of outside of the end), here illustrating a double "wide slot" formation. (It is wide because the end is fully split, rather than merely flexed—see above.) There being no tight end, there seems to be no need to label either end as split; both are. But on the right, the slotback and end positions are merely labeled as wide receivers. The single running back here is shown to one side of the center-quarterback combination, but that "ace" RB could as well be directly behind them.

In some cases, the specific terminology of certain coaches has made its way into the general parlance. Coaches, having no motivation to publicize their plans, usually adopt cryptic codes for certain positions, using letters, numbers, or short names for their convenience. One set of designations which has been making the rounds, as of this writing on Web sites, purporting to explain football is the letters X, Y, and Z to designate receivers. It is doubtful that many coaches agree on the use of these terms to designate specific positions consistently from play to play, and those letters do not seem to enlighten but only to obscure. (One manual for football spectators, in the 1960s, explained that someone calling offensive plays in the huddle would point to primary, secondary, and tertiary receivers while giving them those letters; those designations would vary depending on the play, not on the positions those receivers occupied.) However, one such letter designation has caught on recently: "H-back", illustrated in the offensive formation below:

E            T  G  C  G  T              E                   QB      WB                           HB                   RB

Here the H-back is represented by the symbol, appropriately enough, "HB". The H-back position is like that of the "wingback deep" position previously described in a version of the single wing formation, and here is shown behind a wingback to emphasize that, although more often the H-back and wingback, if there is one, are on opposite sides of the set. It is possible to say the abbreviation "HB" is already taken up by the halfback. The H-back does occupy a position about the same as the halfback in the diamond formation of the 19th century. It is likely that "H-back" is a term derived by back formation (pun unavoidable) from the abbreviation for halfback, although arbitrary letter designation by some coach is just as good an explanation.

You may see an offensive formation like that below, described as one of three tight ends:

E  T  G  C  G  T  E         QB          WB    RB        RB

However, it is labeled above as a version of the wing T, i.e. a T formation wherein one deep back has been replaced by a wingback. The description of its having three tight ends is absurd, inasmuch as a line can have only two ends, but comes about when the wingback position is occupied by a player most suited to blocking who otherwise usually plays tight end. If the extra blocker up front is actually in a line position, then, considering that a potential eligible receiver is being sacrificed, it would be better to conceive the formation as having an extra tackle or guard:

E  T  G  C  G  T  T  E         QB             RB         RB

In the same vein as a formation's supposedly having three tight ends, examine the shotgun formation below. This is similar to the short punt formation shown previously, except that potential forward pass receivers are more widely spread. It is therefore, like the double wide slot offensive formation shown previously, a type of spread formation:

WR                  T  G  C  G  T             WR                WB                 WB                      WR                          TB

However, many would label the tailback above as quarterback, even though the position is clearly the deepest back! Until 1960, the formation above would have been called a double wing, and the tailback labeled a fullback, there being no need for the tailback designation when the backs assume so few intermediate depths. However, the deep back position above is usually occupied by a player who habitually plays QB, so the habitual position name tends to stick, as with the "extra tight end".

The identification engendered by the T formation of quarterback as someone who takes the snap is so strong nowadays that some describe the single wing formation diagrammed previously (under "more position names"), wherein the quarterback is positioned behind other interior line players than the center (and therefore cannot conveniently receive the snap), as having no quarterback! Such descriptions may have the QB as BB, although the system used may involve that player considerably as a ballcarrier or receiver, not just a blocker.

On defense meanwhile, an opposite philosophy to position naming is sometimes followed from that of the supposed third offensive end. Instead of the position name following the player to a different position, a new position name may be applied in such a substitution situation. This occurs when a team that usually uses four defensive backs (counting cornerbacks and safeties) adds a fifth, thus producing the "nickel" defense (a nickel being a 5 cent piece). It will be said that the extra DB is the "nickel back", even though coverage assignments will be redistributed, and therefore no particular DB is functionally or positionally in a "nickel" position, distinct from the other four. Nor, if a sixth DB is added, could one distinguish between the "nickel" and the "dime" back. However, if they are subbed in one at a time, an observer may apply "seniority" in naming one "nickel", etc. A roster will usually simply list such players as S, CB, or simply DB.

== See also ==
- History of American football
