= Glossary of American football terms =

The following terms are used in American football, both conventional and indoor. Some of these terms are also in use in Canadian football; for a list of terms unique to that code, see Glossary of Canadian football.

== 0–9 ==
2–4–5 defense
A type of nickel formation with two linemen (two defensive ends, DEs, or one DE and one defensive tackle, DT), four linebackers (two interior linebackers, ILBs, and two outer linebackers, OLBs), and five defensive backs (three cornerbacks, CBs, one free safety, FS, and one strong safety, SS). More common among teams with 3–4 base defenses than the 3–3–5, because all four starting linebackers remain on-field while the defensive linemen (the slowest players on the defense) come out. This maximizes versatility for the defense against three- and four-wide receiver, WR, offensive sets. a safety will often cover the fourth receiver, and a linebacker will cover the tight end or halfback, leaving three to patrol the middle of the field. The 2–4–5 is most often used against the two-minute offense, when substituting players may be difficult.
3–3–5 defense
A variation of the nickel formation with three linemen (two defensive ends, DEs, and one defensive tackle, DT), three linebackers (two outer linebackers, OLBs and one middle linebacker, MLB), and five defensive backs (three cornerbacks, CBs, one free safety, FS and one strong safety, SS).
3–4 defense
A defensive formation with three linemen and four linebackers. A professional derivative in the 1970s of the earlier Oklahoma, 5–2 or 50 defense, which had five linemen and two linebackers. The 3–4 outside linebackers resemble "stand-up ends" in the older defense. It is sometimes pronounced thirty-four defense. The 3–4 also was spun off from the Miami Dolphins' "52 defense" named for the jersey number worn by linebacker Bob Matheson, who was often used by the Dolphins as a fourth linebacker in passing situations.
4–3 defense
A defensive formation with four linemen and three linebackers. Several variations are employed. It was first used by coach Tom Landry. It is sometimes pronounced forty-three defense.
46 defense
Usually pronounced forty-six defense, a formation of the 4–3 defense (four linemen and three linebackers) featuring several dramatic shifts of personnel. The line is heavily shifted toward the offense's weak side; both outside linebackers tend to play on the strong side outside of the defensive linemen; and three defensive backs (the two cornerbacks and the strong safety) crowd the line of scrimmage. The remaining safety, which is the free safety, stays in the backfield. It was invented by Buddy Ryan during his tenure as defensive coordinator for the Chicago Bears and was popularized by the Bears during their Super Bowl XX championship season.
5–2 defense
A once popular college defense with five defensive linemen and two linebackers. Also known as the "Oklahoma defense", it is structurally very similar to the 3–4. In the 50 defense, the team uses a nose tackle, two defensive tackles lined up over or slightly inside the offensive tackles, and two defensive ends lined up over or outside the tight end. It maximizes size along the line of scrimmage and is mostly used in high school against teams that run the ball a lot.
5–3 defense
A defense with five defensive linemen and three linebackers that appeared in the 1930s to combat improved passing attacks. The 5–3 defense and the 6–2 defense were considered the standard defensive formations of their time, with the 5–3 defense being regarded as the defense that was better against the pass. It was considered the best defense against the T formation. By the late 1950s, NFL defenses had switched to the 4–3 defense or the 5–2 defense as their base defense.
53-man roster
The most players a National Football League team can carry on its active roster at the start of the regular season. To reach the deadline, teams trim rosters by the deadline by releasing players and, if injured, move them to the injured reserve or physically unable to perform list.
6–2 defense
A defense with six defensive linemen and two linebackers that became popular in the 1930s due to improved passing attacks. The 6–2 defense and the 5–3 defense were considered the standard defensive formations of their time, with the 6–2 defense being regarded as the defense that was stronger against the run. As the T formation became more popular, the popularity of the 6–2 defense declined. By 1950, NFL defenses had switched to the 5–2 defense or the 5–3 defense as their base defense.
60-minute man
Someone who played on all three sides of the ball (offense, defense and special teams) throughout games.
7–1–2–1 defense
A defensive formation with seven defensive linemen, one linebacker and three defensive backs. It was invented by Henry L. Williams in 1903. By the mid-1930s, it was considered almost obsolete due to its vulnerability against the pass.
7–2–2 defense
A defensive formation with seven defensive linemen, two linebackers and two defensive backs. It is akin to an offensive two tight end set, or a goal line defense. It was invented by Amos Alonzo Stagg in 1890 and used as the base defense by Knute Rockne at Notre Dame and Mike Donahue at Auburn.

== A ==
A-11 offense
An offensive philosophy designed to appear as if all 11 players are eligible receivers. The offense exploits a loophole in the American football rulebook to technically make the formation a scrimmage kick, and the offensive line is spread across the field, all wearing numbers of eligible receivers, in an effort to confuse and deceive the defense. It was banned in 2009.
adjusted net yards per passing attempt (ANY/A)
$$\frac{\text{Passing Yards} + 20 \cdot (\text{Passing TD}) - 45 \cdot (\text{Interceptions Thrown}) - \text{Sack Yards}}{\text{Passing Attempts} + \text{Sacks}}$$
An expanded version of adjusted yards per passing attempt that includes sack yards.
adjusted yards per passing attempt (AY/A)
$$\frac{\text{Passing Yards} + 20 \cdot (\text{Passing TD}) - 45 \cdot (\text{Interceptions Thrown})}{\text{Passing Attempts}}$$
The team-level calculation of this stat uses gross passing yardage. This stat was introduced, and the reasoning behind it thoroughly explained in The Hidden Game of Football, by Bob Carroll, Pete Palmer, and John Thorn.
Air Coryell
An offensive philosophy developed by San Diego Chargers head coach Don Coryell which combines power running with mid-range and deep-pattern passing. The Air Coryell offense relies on getting receivers in motion and out into patterns that combine to stretch the field, thereby setting up defensive backs with route technique and allowing the quarterback to throw to a certain spot on time where the receiver can catch and turn upfield. During Coryell's tenure as head coach in San Diego, the Chargers led the NFL in passing yards seven times; first from 1978 to 1983, and again in 1985.
air raid offense
An offensive philosophy derived from the West Coast offense but adapted to the shotgun formation. In this offense the running game is heavily de-emphasized while quick, medium, and screen passes are highly developed.
all-purpose yardage
The sum of all yards gained by a player who is in possession of the ball during a play. All-purpose yardage includes rushing and receiving yards gained on offense; yards gained on returns of interceptions and fumbles; and yards gained on kickoff, punt, and missed field goal returns. Called "combined net yards gained" in the official NFL record book.
approximate value
Created by PFR founder Doug Drinen, the Approximate Value (AV) method is an attempt to put a single number on the seasonal value of a player at any position from any year (since 1960).
arm punt
A long, high-risk pass thrown in a third-down situation where, even if the pass is intercepted, the change in field position is comparable to the effect of a traditional punt.
attempt
1. A pass attempt
2. A rush attempt; a carry
3. A kick
audible
A play called by the quarterback at the line of scrimmage to make a change from the play that was called in the huddle.
automatic first down
For several fouls against the defensive team, a first down is awarded to the offensive team even if the result of the penalty does not advance the ball beyond the line to gain. In the NFL and NCAA, the fouls include pass interference and all personal fouls. Under NFHS (high school) rules only roughing the snapper, holder, kicker, and passer are penalized with an automatic first down.

== B ==
back
Any position not typically aligned on the line of scrimmage (exception: defensive linemen are off the line in Canadian rules, but are not backs). Offensively: running back, tailback, quarterback, halfback, flankerback, fullback, and wingback. Defensively: linebacker, cornerback, rover, defensive halfback, and safety.
backfield
The area of an American football field behind the line of scrimmage. The backfield or offensive backfield can also refer to members of the offense who begin plays behind the line, typically including any backs on the field, such as the quarterback, running back and fullback.
backward pass
A pass thrown to a receiver who is farther behind the line of scrimmage than the passer. Also called an "onside pass" in Canadian football. There is no limit to the number of backward passes or where they may be thrown from. Sometimes referred to as a "lateral", which specifically refers to a pass thrown with no motion toward either end zone. If the pass is not completed, it is automatically ruled a fumble, which can be recovered by either team.
ball carrier
The player currently in possession of the football. If the ball is "loose", meaning neither team has possession, there is no ball carrier.
ball control
A strategy that is based on low-risk plays in an effort to avoid losing possession of the ball; examples of when a ball-control strategy would be used include when a team is in the red zone and when a team is protecting a lead late in a game.
Black Monday
The first working day following the final Sunday of the National Football League season (week 18) in which unsuccessful coaches and administration are typically fired or resign their position. The term is also attributed to the day following the annual NFL draft where players' contracts may be terminated once new players are added to a roster.
blitz
A defensive maneuver in which one or more linebackers or defensive backs, who normally remain behind the line of scrimmage, instead charge into the opponent's backfield. However, in the 3–4 defense, one linebacker typically rushes the passer with the three down linemen. This is not considered a blitz. If an additional linebacker is sent, bringing the total number of rushers to five, it is a blitz.
block
The act of one player obstructing another player with their body, either to push the opponent back or to prevent them moving beyond the blocker. Some types of block include: a run block, where the blocker pushes a defensive player back and away from the ball carrier; a pass block, where a blocker protects the thrower by moving laterally and backwards to slow or halt an incoming pass rusher; a cut block; a zone block, which is any block executed in a zone blocking scheme; a trap block; a pull block; a screen block; and a double-team block, where two blockers simultaneously block one player.
blocking
The act of executing a block; the collective play of those players performing blocks; the performance of a blocker or blockers during a game.
blocking back
Used to describe a running back who is assigned to block. It describes either an assignment for a single play or the back's primary function throughout their career, as when describing a fullback who is particularly skilled at blocking. Also an early term for quarterbacks.
blocking sled
A heavy piece of practice equipment, usually a padded angular frame on metal skids, used for developing strength and blocking techniques.
bomb
Also long bomb; a long, distinctly arching pass
bootleg
An offensive play predicated upon misdirection in which the quarterback pretends to hand the ball to another player, and then carries the ball in the opposite direction of the supposed ball carrier with the intent of either passing or running (sometimes the quarterback has the option of doing either). A naked bootleg is a high-risk variation of this play when the quarterback has no blockers.
box
An area on the defensive side of the ball, directly opposite the offensive linemen and about five yards deep; having eight players in the box means bringing in a defensive back, normally the strong safety, to help stop the offensive team's running game
bridge quarterback
A quarterback, typically a veteran journeyman, who is signed to a short contract to play immediately while the franchise looks to acquire and develop a player to hold the position for the long term.
bust
Term often used to refer to a player, usually one drafted early on the first day of the NFL draft, who failed to meet the expectations of the drafting team.
bubble screen
A type of screen pass where the quarterback takes the snap and immediately throws to the inside-most receiver, who is moving towards the sideline with his body facing the quarterback, on either side of the ball. The receiver catches the ball, and then turns to run downfield using the additional receivers to block.
busted play
A play which deteriorates to the point that it no longer conforms with the coach's playbook and leads to confusion or chaos on the field.
buttonhook (hook, dig)
A route where a receiver runs straight upfield a certain distance and then plants hard and runs straight back towards the quarterback. Often simply called a "hook route" or a "dig route". In some cases, a dig route is considered a very long buttonhook, such as 15 yards or more downfield. Hence the receiver must dig their cleats in hard to stop and come back at the quarterback after running so far and fast.

== C ==
cadence
As per The Athletic, "the specific color-number-color-number pattern required to start every football play and give instruction to the offensive line."
carry or carries
A statistic referring to the number of times a rushing player attempts to advance the ball. A ball carrier can be any player that attempts to advance the ball during an offensive play, regardless of position.
center (C)
A player position on offense. This player usually snaps the ball.
center-eligible
A trick play where the entire offensive line is to one side of the center at the snap, so that the center is an extra lineman on the end, and therefore an eligible receiver.
centre
Canadian center.
chain
The 10-yard-long chain that is used by the chain crew (aka "chain gang") to measure for a new series of downs.
checkdown
When a quarterback has to complete a short pass, commonly to a running back or tight end, as a last resort in their read progression.
chip shot
A very short field goal, usually of 25 yards or less, that is almost certain to be successful. Named after the golf term of the same name, for the ball's high and short trajectory.
chop block
Similar to a cut block in which one offensive player blocks a defensive player below the knees and another blocks them above the waist. It is illegal to block low if a teammate is already engaged with the defensive player blocking high, to prevent knee and ankle injuries.
clipping
A penalty called for an illegal block in which the blocked player is hit from behind at or below the waist; the penalty is 15 yards. Originally, clipping was defined as any block to the back, but is now restricted to blocks at or below the waist. Other blocks from the back are now punished with 10-yard penalties.
clock management
The use of the rules of the game to manipulate the starting and stopping of the game clock to the team's advantage, usually near the end of the game or half.
coffin corner
The corner of the field of play between the end zone and the 10 yard line. A punter, if they are close enough, will often attempt to kick the ball out of bounds close to the receiving team's goal line and pin them back near their own end zone.
comeback route
A receiver or tight end route where a player runs straight upfield a specified number of yards, plants hard, turns and runs back towards the sideline at a 45 degree angle. Despite the name, a wide receiver does not come back towards the quarterback; instead they try to catch the ball and guarantee getting out of bounds.
completion
A forward pass that is successfully completed.
completion percentage
The percentage of passes completed from passes attempted.
contain
A defensive assignment. On outside runs such as a sweep, one defensive player (usually a cornerback or outside linebacker) is assigned to keep the rusher from getting to the edge of the play and turning upfield. If executed properly, the rusher will have to turn upfield before the design of the play calls for it, giving the linebackers a better chance of stopping the play for little or no gain.
cornerback
A defensive back who lines up near the line of scrimmage across from a wide receiver. Their primary job is to disrupt passing routes and to defend against short and medium passes, and to contain the rusher on rushing plays.
cover
An attempt to prevent a receiver from catching a pass. There are two general schemes for defending against the pass:
- Man-to-man – each eligible receiver is covered by a defensive back or a linebacker.
- Zone – certain players (usually defensive backs and linebackers, though occasionally linemen) are assigned an area on the field that they are to cover.

Common types of coverage:

- Cover zero – strict man-to-man coverage with no help from safeties (usually a blitz play with at least five players crossing the line of scrimmage)
- Cover one – man-to-man coverage with at least one safety not assigned a player to cover who can help out on deep pass routes.
- Cover two – zone coverage with the safeties playing deep and covering half the field each. Can be "cover two man", where every receiver is covered by a defensive player, or "cover two zone" (also known as "Tampa two"), where a CB covers the flat zone, "OLB hook zone" or an "MLB curl zone".
- Cover three – zone coverage as above, but with extra help from the strong safety or a cornerback, so that each player covers one-third of a deep zone.
- Cover four – as above, with the corners and safeties dropping into deep coverage, with each taking one-fourth of the width of the field. Also referred to as "quarters".
counter
A running play in which the running back takes a step in the apparent direction of the play, only to get the handoff in the other direction. Weak side linemen will sometimes pull and lead the back downfield (sometimes called a "counter trap"). The play is designed to get the defense to flow away from the action for a few steps as they follow the linemen, allowing more room for the running back.
crackback block
An illegal block delivered below the opponent's waist by an offensive player who had left the area of close line play and then returned to it, or was not within it at the snap. The term is also used to describe a legal block (delivered from the front, or from the side with the offensive player's helmet in front of the blocked player) by a wide receiver on a player who lined up inside of them.
cut
A sharp change of direction by a running player. Also called a "cutback".
cut blocking
A blocking technique in which offensive linemen, and sometimes other blockers, block legally below the waist (i.e., from the front of the defensive player) in an attempt to bring the defenders to the ground, making them unable to pursue a running back.

== D ==
dead ball
A ball which is no longer in play
dead-ball foul
A penalty committed by either team before or after the play. If it is after, the result of the play stands and the penalty is assessed from the current position of the ball. Pre-snap penalties on the defense do not require the play to be blown dead unless a defensive player has a clear path to the quarterback. On the offense, some penalties stop the play before it begins and some do not. A dead ball foul that does not stop play cannot be declined.
dead zone
Also known as "four-down territory;" a spot on the field outside of a kicker's field goal range but close enough to the opposing end zone that a punt will likely result in a touchback.
defensive back
A cornerback or safety position on the defensive team; commonly defends against wide receivers. Generally there are four defensive backs playing at a time; but see nickel back and dime back.
defensive end
A player position on defense who lines up on the outside of the defensive line and which principal function is to deliver pressure to the quarterback.
defensive tackle
A player position on defense on the inside of the defensive line and which principal function is to contain the run. A defensive tackle who lines up directly across from the center is known as a "nose tackle", often the heaviest player on the defense. A defensive tackle who lines up between an offensive guard and offensive tackle is known as a "three-gap technique tackle".
defensive team
The team that begins a play from scrimmage not in possession of the ball
delay of game
A five-yard foul which occurs when the offensive team does not put the ball in play before the play clock runs out. There are also less common occurrences which result in a delay of game foul, such as a defensive player holding an offensive player on the ground to prevent them from lining up during a two-minute drill.
delayed spike
A form of intentional grounding where the passer spikes the ball at any time or circumstance other than what is prescribed by the procedures of stopping the clock (such as a spike from shotgun, faking the spike and then spiking, or spiking to redo a botched play). Unlike other types of intentional grounding, pressure is not required as an element for this to be called.
dime back
The second extra, or sixth total, defensive back. Named because a dime has the same value as two nickels. See nickel back
direct snap
A play in which the ball is passed directly to a player other than the quarterback by the center. Contrast with an indirect snap play in which the ball is first handed to the quarterback, who then passes or hands it on to the eventual ball carrier. Also used to refer to formations that use a direct snap, such as the single wing.
dive
A play in which the ball is handed off to the running back, who attacks the middle of the offensive formation (between the OG). This play is part of the triple option strategy
doink
A field goal attempt that hits the goalposts (upright or crossbar) and does not go into the goal. (A ball that does pass through the goal after hitting the posts is said to carom into the goal.) In most levels of play the ball is dead after a doink and cannot be played, except in arena football, where doinks can be returned by the opposing team if they land in the field of play; in Canadian football, they do not count as a single unlike a missed field goal. The name is an onomatopoeia emulating the sound of the upright when struck by a football.
double reverse
A play in which the ball reverses direction twice behind the line of scrimmage; this is usually accomplished by means of two or three hand-offs, each hand-off going in an opposite direction as the previous one. Such a play is extremely infrequent in football. Some people confuse the double reverse with a reverse, which is a play with two hand-offs instead of three.
double wing
A formation with two tight ends and two wingbacks in which the snap is tossed by the center between their legs to the quarterback or halfback moderately deep in the backfield.
double wing(ed)-T
A formation with two tight ends and two wingbacks in which the center hands the ball to the quarterback.
down
A unit of the game that starts with a legal snap or legal free kick after the ball is ready for play and ends when the ball next becomes dead. First down is the first of the plays; fourth is the last down in American (third in Canadian) football. A first down occurs after a change of possession of the ball, after advancing the ball 10 yards following a previous first down and after certain penalties.
down box
The post used by the chain gang to mark the line of scrimmage and designate the current down
down by contact
When the player carrying the ball touches the ground with any part of his body other than the feet, hands, or arms as a direct result of contact with a player of the opposing team. In professional football a player must be down by contact in order for play to stop; if they trip and fall without being touched by an opposing player they are free to get up and continue advancing the ball. Exceptions to this rule that result in play stopping include when the player carrying the ball is on the ground but not downed by contact (e.g., after tripping and falling) and is touched by a member of the opposing team while still on the ground; or when the player with the ball intentionally kneels down on the ground and stops advancing, e.g. a quarterback kneel or touchback. This rule does not apply in collegiate and high school football where a player need not be downed by contact at these levels in order for play to stop.
down lineman
A player stationed in front of his line of scrimmage and who has either one (three-point stance) or two (four-point stance) hands on the ground.
draw play
A play in which the quarterback drops back as if to pass, then hands off to a running back or runs with the ball themself. See scramble
drive
1. A continuous set of offensive plays gaining substantial yardage and several first downs, usually leading to a scoring opportunity.
2. A blocking technique – "drive block" – in which an offensive player through an advantaged angle or with assistance drive a defensive player out of position creating a hole for the ball carrier.
drop kick
A kick in which the ball is dropped and kicked once it hits the ground and before it hits it again; a half-volley kick. A drop kick is one of the types of kick which can score a field goal. Drop kicks are extremely rare due to the pointed nature of the ball.

== E ==
edge rusher
A defensive player whose most common role is attacking the quarterback from the edge of the offensive line. On teams that use a four-man defensive line, the defensive ends fill this role. Teams that use a three-man line will typically use an outside linebacker in this position.
eligible receiver
A player who may legally touch a forward pass. On the offense, these are: the ends, backs, and (except in the NFL) one player in position to take a hand-to-hand snap; provided the player's jersey displays a number in the ranges allowed for eligible receivers. All players of the opposing team are eligible receivers, and once the ball is touched by a player of the opposing team (anywhere in American, or beyond the lines of scrimmage in Canadian, football), all players become eligible. For an offensive player be eligible in High School level or below at the time of the snap he must be eligible both by positioning and number(not numbered 50-79).
encroachment
An illegal action by a defensive player crossing the line of scrimmage and making contact with an opponent before the ball is snapped.
end around
A play, often confused with a reverse, where the quarterback hands the ball off to a wide receiver. The receiver motions into the backfield as the ball is snapped to take the handoff and runs around the opposite end from where they lined up.
end zone
The area between the end line (or deadline in Canadian amateur football) and the goal line, bounded by the sidelines.
extra point
A single point scored in a conversion attempt by making what would be a field goal during general play. See try

== F ==
face mask
The protective grill that forms part of the football helmet
face mask, grasping
A foul in which a player grabs the face mask or helmet opening of another player's helmet, usually in the process of making a tackle. It results in a 15-yard penalty.
false start
A foul (resulting in a five-yard penalty) in which an offensive player moves before the ball is snapped, potentially drawing defensive players offside.
fair catch
In American football, an unhindered catch of an opponent's kick. The player wanting to make a fair catch must signal for a fair catch by waving an arm overhead while the ball is in the air. After that signal, once the ball is possessed, it is dead immediately and opponents will receive a 15-yard penalty for any contact with the receiver.
fair catch kick
A free kickoff that takes point at the spot of a fair catch, if the catching team so chooses to execute it; unlike the standard kickoff, it can score three points if the ball goes through the goal. It is very rare (in fact, college football does not even allow it); a very narrow set of criteria have to be met for it to be useful.
fantasy football
A game in which the participants (called "owners") each draft on their own or with the aid of software a team of real-life NFL players and then score points based on those players' statistical performance on the field.
FBS
The NCAA Division I Football Bowl Subdivision, the top level of U.S. college football. Historically known as Division I-A.
FCS
The NCAA Division I Football Championship Subdivision, the second level of U.S. college football. Distinguished from FBS by reduced scholarship limits and the existence of an official NCAA championship event. Historically known as Division I-AA.
field judge
The official traditionally in charge of timekeeping
field of play
The area between both the goal lines and the sidelines, and in some contexts the space vertically above it.
field goal
A score of three points made by place- or drop-kicking the ball through the opponent's goal other than via a kickoff or free kick following a safety; formerly, "goal from the field". A missed field goal can be returned as a punt, if recovered in-bounds by the defending team. In some leagues, four-point field goals can be scored under special circumstances.
field position
A relative measure of how many yards a team must travel in order to score.
first down
The first of a set of four downs. Usually, a team which has a first down needs to advance the ball ten yards to receive another first down, but penalties or field position (i.e. less than ten yards from the opposing end zone) can affect this.
flag
A weighted yellow cloth thrown by a field official to indicate that a foul has been committed. Also the weighted red flag that an NFL head coach throws onto the field to alert officials that they want a replay review.
flanker
A player position on offense. A wide receiver who lines up in the backfield outside of another receiver. The term is used infrequently in American football, having been long since replaced by the "Z" wide receiver.
flat
An area on the field between the line of scrimmage and 10 yards into the defensive backfield, and within 15 yards of the sideline. Running backs often run pass routes to the flat when they are the safety valve receiver.
flea flicker
A trick play in which a running back throws a backward pass back to the quarterback, who then throws a pass to a wide receiver or tight end.
flexbone
A formation involving three running backs where a fullback is lined up behind the quarterback and two slotbacks are lined up behind the line of scrimmage at both ends of the offensive line.
formation
An arrangement of the offensive skill players. A formation usually is described in terms of how the running backs line up (e.g. I formation, which refers to the situation where the halfback is lined up about seven yards deep, and the fullback is lined up about five yards deep, both directly behind the quarterback) or how the wide receivers line up (e.g. "trips left", in which three wide receivers line up to the left of the linemen). Frequently, the formation will allude to both, such as with a "strong I slot right", in which the halfback is lined up seven yards deep behind the quarterback, the fullback is five yards deep behind the guard or tackle on the strong side, and both wide receivers are lined up on the right side of the offensive line. There are rules limiting what is legal in a formation. All five offensive linemen must be on the line of scrimmage (a small amount of leeway is given to tackles when lined up for pass protection). Also, there must be one receiver (usually one tight end and one wide receiver) lined up on the line on either side of the offensive linemen (it does not matter how close they are to the tackles, as long as they are on the line), with a total of no fewer than seven players on the line, five of which must be numbered between 50–79. A numbering exception exists if the offense is in a scrimmage kick formation which allows a player whose number is 1–49 or 80–99 to take the place of a lineman numbered 50–79. A receiver who is on the line may not go in motion.
forward pass
A pass that touches a person, object, or the ground closer to the opponent's end line than where it was released from, or is accidentally lost during a forward throwing motion.
forward progress
The location to which a ball carrier's forward momentum carries him before they are tackled. At the end of a play, the football is spotted at the point where the ball carrier's forward progress is stopped, even if they are pushed backward by the defenders.
fourth down
The final of a set of four downs. Unless a first down is achieved or a penalty forces a replay of the down, the team will lose control of the ball after this play. If a team does not think they can get a first down, they often punt on fourth down or attempt a field goal if they are close enough to do so.
fourth down conversion
The act of using a fourth down play to make a first down (also known as "going for it [on fourth down]"). These are comparatively uncommon.
four-down territory
1. The dead zone.
2. A period of time, late in the fourth quarter, where a team that is on offense but trailing cannot afford to surrender possession, since the defense will not realistically be able to stop the defense with enough time remaining to score enough points to tie or take the lead before the game ends. During such a time, an offensive team will attempt fourth-down conversions in situations when it would otherwise be too risky to do so seriously.
four-point stance
down lineman's stance with four points on the ground, in other words, two feet and two hands; often a technique used in short yardage or goal line situations.
free kick
A kick made to put the ball in play as a kickoff or following a safety (the score; "safety touch" in Canadian football) or fair catch.
free play
When the defense commits a foul at the time of the snap (usually an offside foul), the offense can play out the rest of the play and either take the five-yard penalty and replay the down or the result of the play, whichever is more advantageous. Thus, the offense can afford to take greater risks since any catastrophic result will be wiped out by the defensive foul that has already been committed.
free safety (FS)
A player position on defense. Free safeties typically play deep, or "center field", and often have the pass defense responsibility of assisting other defensive backs in deep coverage (compared to strong safeties, who usually have an assigned receiver and run support responsibilities).
front seven
The defensive linemen and linebackers. The most common configurations of a front seven are 4–3 (four down linemen, three linebackers) and the 3–4 (three linemen and four linebackers).
fullback
A player position on offense. Originally, lined up deep behind the quarterback in the T formation. In modern formations this position may be varied, and this player has more blocking responsibilities in comparison to the halfback or tailback.
fumble
A ball that a player accidentally lost possession of; in Canadian football the term includes muffs.
fumblerooski
A trick play where the quarterback deliberately places the ball on the ground, technically fumbling so that another player (usually a lineman) can pick up the ball and advance it. This type of play is now banned by most football sanctioning groups.

== G ==
game manager
A type of quarterback, loosely defined, who makes a minimum number of mistakes for a team that relies on its defense and rushing offense to win games.
goal
A surface in space marked by a structure of two upright posts 18 1/2 feet apart (23 1/3 in high school football) extending above a horizontal crossbar the top edge of which is ten feet off the ground. The goal is the surface above the bar and between the lines of the inner edges of the posts, extending infinitely upward, centered above each end line in American, and each goal line in Canadian football.
goal area
Alternate term for end zone, used primarily in Canadian football
goal line
The front of the end zone
goal line stand
When a team's defense stops another team's offense from scoring a touchdown when the opposition's offense is near the goal line
gridiron
1. The field of play; a football field
2. A generalized term for American, Canadian, arena, and other related forms of football, especially in contrast with rugby football (rugby union, rugby league) and association football (soccer). See also Gridiron football The word derives from the same root as griddle, meaning a "lattice". The original field was marked in a grid of crisscrossed lines; the ball would be snapped in the grid in which it was downed on the previous play. In modern usage, a gridiron is a surface with parallel lines. American and related codes of football have lines spaced every five yards (as compared to 10–12 metres in rugby), giving the field a unique look among football codes.
guard
Two of the five offensive line positions. See lineman
gunner
The widest player on the line in a punting formation. The gunner is often one of the fastest players on the team, usually a cornerback or wide receiver.

== H ==
Hail Mary
A long pass play, thrown towards a group of receivers near or in the end zone in hope of a touchdown. Used by a team as a last resort as time is running out in either of two halves (usually by a team trailing in the second half). The term was first used during Roger Staubach's comeback victory in which he threw such a pass to Drew Pearson to defeat the Minnesota Vikings in a divisional round playoff game in 1975. The term refers to the Catholic prayer.
halfback
A player position on offense. In American football, it is a type of running back; in Canadian football, it is a type of defensive back. Also known as a tailback.
halfback option play
A trick play in which the halfback has the option to either throw a pass or run with the ball
halo violation
From 1983 until the end of the 2002 season, in the NCAA (college football) the halo rule was a foul for interference with the opportunity to catch a kick. The so called "halo rule" stated that no player of the kicking team may be within two yards of a receiving team player positioned to catch a punt or kickoff (before that person has touched the ball). The rule was abolished beginning in the 2003 season.

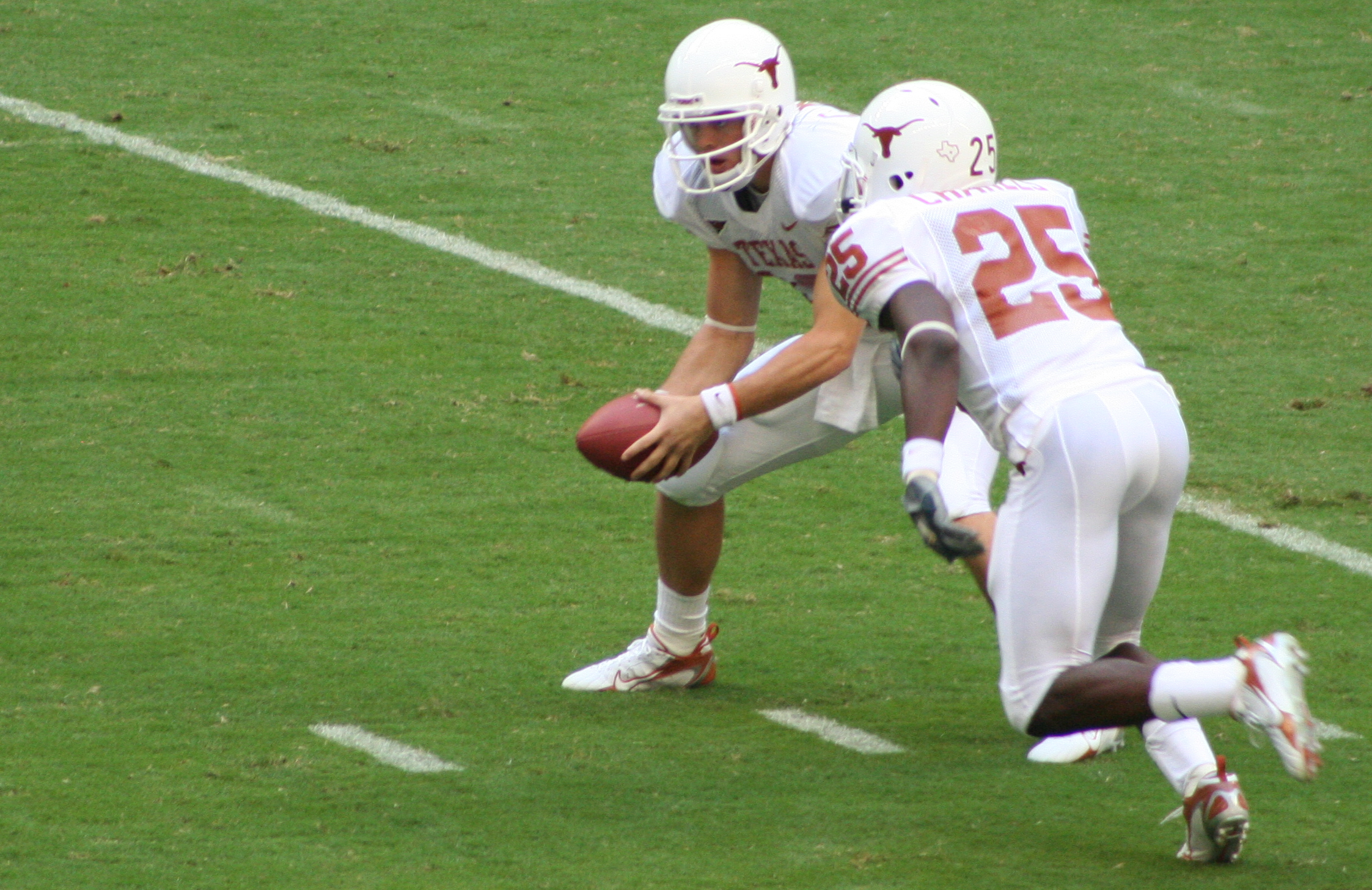
In a hand-off, the quarterback (Colt McCoy, No. 12) is handing the ball to the running back (Jamaal Charles, No. 25)

hand-off
A move in which a player transfers the ball to another player, and the receiving player takes possession of the ball before it leaves the hands of the giver (thus the ball is never in flight). A handoff can occur in any direction. Sometimes called a "switch" in touch football.
hands team
A group of players, mostly wide receivers, that are responsible for recovering an onside kick. They line up as close as possible to the 10-yard neutral zone and their goal is to recover the ball immediately after, but only if, the ball crosses out of the neutral zone.
hard count
A strategy commonly used by offenses to convert on fourth down and less than five yards to go. An offense will take the full time on the play clock with the quarterback utilizing an irregular, accented (thus, the term "hard") cadence for the snap count in the hope that the defense will jump offside, giving the offense the five yards needed to convert the first down. However, if the defense does not go offside, the offense will take a five-yard penalty for delay of game or a timeout.
hash marks
Lines between which the ball begins each play. The lines are parallel to and a distance in from the side lines and marked as broken lines. If a play is blown dead while the ball is between the hash marks, the ball is spotted where it is blown dead for the following play. If the play ends outside the hash marks, the ball is spotted at the nearer hash mark.
H-back
A player listed in a roster or depth chart as a fullback but with better athletic or pass-catching abilities and playing as a hybrid of a fullback and a tight end
hike
Synonym of "snap" – the handoff or pass from the center that begins a play from scrimmage
holder
A player who holds the ball upright for a place kick. Often backup quarterbacks are used for their superior ball-handling ability and in the event of a bad snap requiring a pass play, or punters for their ability to catch long snaps.
holding
There are two kinds of holding:
- Offensive holding, illegally blocking a player from the opposing team by grabbing and holding their uniform or body
- Defensive holding, called against defensive players who hold offensive players, but who are not actively making an attempt to catch the ball (if the defensive player were to impede an offensive player in the act of catching the ball, that would be the more severe foul of pass interference)
home run
A touchdown scored from a long distance. Borrowed from the term for the baseball play.
home run hitter/home run threat
A player who is counted on to score touchdowns from a long distance, often a receiver or running back.
hook and lateral
A trick play in which a receiver (usually a wide receiver) runs a hook pattern (i.e., moving toward the line of scrimmage to make a catch), and then laterals the ball to a second player (generally another receiver or a running back) going in a different direction.
horse-collar
A horse-collar is a type of tackle made by grabbing the back-inside of an opponent's shoulder pads or jersey. This type of tackle was banned in the NFL in 2005 and in college football in 2008.
hospital pass
A hospital pass is a pass thrown by a quarterback to a receiver in a manner that exposes the receiver to a violent, potentially injurious hit from defenders.
hot read
When a quarterback sees a blitz coming and quickly passes to a receiver running a short route. This involves the quarterback adjusting their target and the "hot receiver" adjusting their route (for instance, breaking off a deeper route in favor of a slant or hitch). If a quarterback at the line of scrimmage reads the defense and identifies a blitz coming, they may call an audible to designate a receiver as a hot read or hot receiver.
huddle
An on-field meeting of team members to communicate instructions for the upcoming play
hurry-up offense
An offensive strategy designed to gain yardage while running as little time off the clock as possible. Often involves making plays without a huddle. This technique can also be used to keep the defensive team off-balance.
hut
A loud, repeated command by quarterbacks for the other players to move ("Hut! Hut! Hut!"). The command replaced "hike!" in the second half of the 20th century, probably as a result of players returning from World War II military service adapting the drill language they were familiar with (as in "Atten-hut!", "Hut, two, three, four!").

== I ==
I formation
A formation that includes a fullback and tailback lined up directly behind the quarterback while the quarterback is under center. By definition, the fullback lines up in front of the tailback. Several variations on this backfield formation exist, including the "offset I" (in which the fullback lines up out of line to the left or right of the quarterback and halfback; also known as the "strong" or "weak I" depending on which direction the fullback is positioned), the "Maryland I" and "power I" (in which an additional fullback is added to the backfield, either next to in the power I or in front of in the Maryland I, the fullback).
icing the kicker
When a team calls time out just before the kicker has the ball snapped. A team is limited to calling one time-out on any given play (thus a team cannot repeatedly call all of its time-outs to prevent the game from continuing, or else a delay of game penalty or, more rarely, a palpably unfair act penalty is imposed). It is thought that kickers tend to miss after being iced due to nervousness, so icing the kicker usually happens at the end of the game before a potential walk-off field goal. There is little evidence that this tactic works.
illegal formation
On offense, there must be exactly seven players lined up on the line of scrimmage for at least one count before the ball is snapped. If not, then it is an illegal formation.
illegal motion
On offense, a player may be in motion but cannot be going forward at the time of the snap (except in arena and Canadian football where one player is allowed to do so), and a lineman must be set for one second before the snap. Otherwise, it is an illegal motion.
illegal shift
On offense, only one person is allowed to be in pre-snap motion after the formation is set. A second person may go in motion after the first has come to a set position for one second. If these conditions are not met when sending players into motion, an illegal shift has occurred.
incomplete pass
A forward pass of the ball which no eligible offensive player caught. Interceptions are counted as incompletions.
imperialism
A simulation game played on a map of the United States. Each team in a league begins with the territory of their designated market area. After each week, the winning teams "conquer" the territories of their opponents. Most commonly played using college football divisions as the base, as the large number of teams and relatively short weeks generally ensures that the game continues throughout the season without a hegemony.
inbounds lines
The hash marks
indirect snap
A play in which the ball is handed to the quarterback rather than thrown directly to the ball carrier by the center as in a direct snap play. So named because the quarterback acts as an intermediary in relaying the ball to the ball carrier. Also used to refer to formations that use such a snap, as most modern formations do. Indirect snap formations increased in popularity after World War II.
ineligible receiver
Certain players on the offense are not allowed to catch passes. For example, in most situations offensive interior linemen cannot be receivers and they may cause their team to be penalized if they catch the ball. An exception is if the ball has already been tipped by a different player. In six-man football all players are eligible receivers.
intentional grounding
A type of illegal forward pass; thrown without an intended receiver and no chance of completion to any offensive player. This foul costs the offense a loss of down and 10 yards. If it occurs 10 yards behind the line of scrimmage, then the 10 yards are taken from the spot of the foul. If the foul is committed in the end zone the penalty is a safety. Intentional grounding is not called in the case of a spike after a hand to hand snap or, if under NFL or NCAA rules, the quarterback was outside the tackle box, (the area between each tackle) at the time of the pass, provided that the ball travels at least to the line of scrimmage. The tackle box is also known as the "pocket".
interception
The legal catching of a forward pass thrown by an opposing player
interference
An older term not to be confused with pass interference; to lead block for a player with the ball, usually in the open field.
interior offensive line
Refers to the center and guards.

== J ==
Jack
Interior linebacker (ILB) of the 3–4 formation, that plays in the weak side of the formation. Also known as "Mo".
juke (football move)
To evade a tackler by a deceptive move, and thus without need of a stiff arm.
jumbo
An offensive package which includes two tight ends, a full back and a half back. Similar to heavy jumbo, in which either the half back or the fullback is replaced by another tight end. In a goal line formation, Miami package, often one or more of the tight ends is actually a linebacker or an offensive lineman. In the NFL, such a player must report in as an eligible receiver because a lineman or linebacker would not generally wear an eligible number.

== K ==
kick
A punt, place kick, or drop kick
kicker
Player who specializes in placekicking (i.e. field goals and kick offs). In rare cases, the placekicker solely handles field goals while a kickoff specialist handles kickoffs.
kickoff
A free kick which starts each half, or restarts the game following a touchdown or field goal. The kickoff may be a place kick in American or Canadian football, or a drop kick in American football.
kick returner
A player on the receiving team who specializes in fielding kicks and running them back.
kick six
A field goal or punt that is blocked and returned for a touchdown, the return of a missed field goal for a touchdown, or the return of a kickoff or punt for a touchdown. Popularly used in reference to the 2013 Iron Bowl game.
kneel
A low-risk play in which the player in possession of the ball kneels down after receiving the snap, ending the play while keeping the clock running. This is done to end the game sooner without needing to run a riskier play. The player kneeling is said to "take a knee", and thus is "taking a knee" or "taking the knee". The quarterback of the team in the lead will often take a knee on the first snap following the two-minute warning. Though long frowned upon – because it was not in accordance with the game's doctrine of "toughness" – taking a knee became an accepted way to run out the clock after the events of the Miracle at the Meadowlands. To this end, players will sometimes forgo scoring a touchdown and instead choose to run out the clock by kneeling short of reaching the end zone. This is usually done when the team with possession of the ball is in the lead, but not always.

== L ==
lateral
See backward pass
leg whip
An illegal block or tackle using the legs to trip an opponent
line of scrimmage
One of six vertical planes parallel to the goal line when the ball is to be put in play by scrimmage. For each team in American football, the line of scrimmage is through the point of the ball closest to their end line. The two lines of scrimmage are called the offensive line of scrimmage and defensive line of scrimmage, often shortened to "line". In Canadian football, the line of scrimmage of the defensive team is one yard their side of the ball.
linebacker
A player position on defense. The linebackers typically play one to six yards behind the defensive linesmen (DLs) and are the most versatile players on defense because they can defend both run and pass plays or be called to blitz. There are two types of LB: middle linebacker (MLB) and outside linebacker (OLB). In a 3–4 formation, an OLB may be designated as a "rush linebacker", rushing the passer on almost every play.
lineman
A defensive or offensive position on the line of scrimmage. On offense, the player snapping the ball is the center. The players to their sides are the guards, and the players to the outside of the guards are the tackles. The players on the end of the line are the ends. This may be varied in an unbalanced line. On defense, the outside linemen are ends and those inside are tackles. If there are five or six linemen, the innermost linemen are known as guards. This is rare in professional football except for goal-line defenses, but is sometimes seen in high school and college.
line to gain
An imaginary line spanning the width of the field across which the offense must advance the ball in order to attain a first down. The official location of the line to gain is indicated by the chain crew as directed by the officials, and in games broadcast on television the line to gain may also be indicated by a yellow line superimposed onto the field.
live ball
Any ball that is in play, whether it is in a player's possession or not. The ball is live during plays from scrimmage and free kicks, including kickoffs.
live ball foul
A foul given for various infractions such as changing numbers during a game
long snapper
A center who specializes in the long, accurate snaps required for punts and field goal attempts. Most teams employ a specialist long snapper instead of requiring the normal center to perform this duty.

== M ==
man coverage
A defensive concept where a defensive player, usually a defensive back or linebacker, is tasked with covering a certain offensive player, usually an eligible receiver. This concept differs from zone coverage, where defensive players defend an area on the field. In most cases, linebackers are tasked with being in man coverage with Tight Ends and Running Backs, whereas defensive backs usually cover wide receivers and sometimes Tight Ends.
man in motion
A player on offense who is moving backwards or parallel to the line of scrimmage at the snap. In American football, only one offensive player can be in motion at a time, cannot be moving toward the line of scrimmage at the snap, and may not be a player who is on the line of scrimmage. In Canadian football, more than one back can be in motion, and may move in any direction as long as they are behind the line of scrimmage at the snap.
man-to-man coverage
A defense in which all players in pass coverage, typically linebackers and defensive backs, cover a specific player. Pure man coverage is very rare; defenses typically mix man and zone coverages.
Marty ball
A conservative gameplan which involves an offense based around the use of running backs with use of the passing game only to advance the running game, and a great emphasis on defense. Popular term for Marty Schottenheimer's approach to coaching.
Maryland-I
An I formation with three running backs aligned behind the quarterback in a straight line
max protect
A modification used on pass plays (usually combined with a shotgun formation) which keeps the tight end and both backs in behind the line of scrimmage to pass protect rather than run a pass route. This is used in obvious blitzing situations to give the quarterback "maximum protection" in the pocket. Although good for holding off a blitz, it leaves the quarterback with only two receivers to throw to (and therefore only two players for the secondary to defend).
mike
The middle linebacker in a 4–3 formation. In the 3–4 formation, the mike is the interior linebacker that plays on the strong side of the formation. The mike has the responsibility to defend the interior gaps and the curl zone. The mike is the leader of the defense and has to be as bright as a quarterback because often they call the audibles on defense.
mo (ILB)
Also known as "jack", the interior linebacker, 3–4 formation, that plays on the weak side of the formation.
Monster
A player position on the defensive team, the monster is a strong safety which is generally given free rein to play as they see fit, including pass coverage, run defense, and in the pass rush. See strong safety
motion
The ordered movement of eligible receivers prior to the snap. Motion can be used to cause mismatches. Another use for motion is to enhance the pre-snap read of the defensive coverage. In Canadian and indoor football, motion is also used to gain momentum prior to the snap. Generally, if the coverage is man, the receiver's defender will follow them across the formation and if it is zone coverage the defenders will exchange responsibilities by shifting or bumping over.
muffed punt
Occurs when there is an "uncontrolled touch" of the football after it is punted. May be recovered but not advanced by the kicking team.

== N ==
n-possession game
A way of expressing the number of times a team, that is late in the game and trails its opponent, must secure possession of the ball and score without allowing the opponent to do the same in order to tie or overtake the opponent. Eight points (a touchdown and a two-point conversion) are the most points possible on any given possession; therefore, the number of possessions (n) necessary is equal to the point margin, divided by eight, rounded up to the nearest integer. For instance, a team down by 17 points would be in a three-possession game, needing to score at least two touchdowns with extra points and a field goal in at least three consecutive possessions without allowing the opposing team to score.
net yards gained per passing attempt (NY/A)
$$\frac{\text{Passing Yards} - \text{Sack Yards}}{\text{Passing Attempts} + \text{Times Sacked}}$$
neutral zone
The region between the lines of scrimmage or between the free kick restraining lines
NFL
The National Football League
NFL Europa
The NFL's former six-team European spring league, which folded after its 2007 season. It was originally intended to introduce NFL culture to Europe, but ended up being a secondary league for failed NFL players. Only a few have successfully transitioned from Europa to the NFL, most notably Kurt Warner (of the Amsterdam Admirals), who was later inducted into the Pro Football Hall of Fame.
nickel back
An extra, or fifth, defensive back. Named after the five-cent coin. Popularized by the Miami Dolphins in the 1970s, now common. Used in situations where a forward pass is expected.
no-huddle offense
A tactic wherein the offense quickly forms near the line of scrimmage without huddling before the next play.
nose tackle
A tackle in a three-man defensive line who lines up opposite the center. Contrary to a regular defensive tackle, a nose tackle is often much larger and considered the "anchor" of the line, effective at disrupting blocking schemes and stopping runs.

== O ==
offensive team
The team with possession of the ball
offside
An infraction of the rule that requires both teams to be on their own side of their restraining line as or before the ball is put in play. Offside is normally called on the defensive team during a scrimmage down and on the kicking team during free kick downs.
In Canadian football, at the time a ball is kicked by a teammate, being ahead of the ball, or being the person who held the ball for the place kick
one back formation
A formation where the offensive team has one running back in the backfield with the quarterback. Other eligible receivers are near the line of scrimmage.
onside conversion
A play, originating in the Alliance of American Football and since adopted by other minor professional leagues, in which the scoring team opts to attempt to gain a set amount of yardage (10 to 15 yards in most leagues) on one play from scrimmage; if successful, the team retains possession, but if unsuccessful, the opposing team regains possession. The onside conversion, in leagues where it is available, can only be attempted under select circumstances—usually the attempting team must be trailing their opponent, and the game must be in the fourth quarter.
onside kick
A play in which the kicking team tries to recover the kicked ball
option offense
An offense heavily relying upon the option run and variations thereof
option run
Usually, a type of play in which the quarterback has the option of handing off, keeping, or laterally passing to one or more backs. Often described by a type of formation or play action, such as "triple option", "veer option", or "counter option". Teams running option plays often specialize in them. Less often, a play in which a running back may either pass or run.
oskie
A signal called out by defenders when an interception is made

== P ==
PAT
Point after touchdown. See try.
package
1. The group of players on the field for a given play. For example, a nickel package substitutes a cornerback for either a linebacker or a defensive lineman (the latter is referred to as a "3–3–5 nickel",

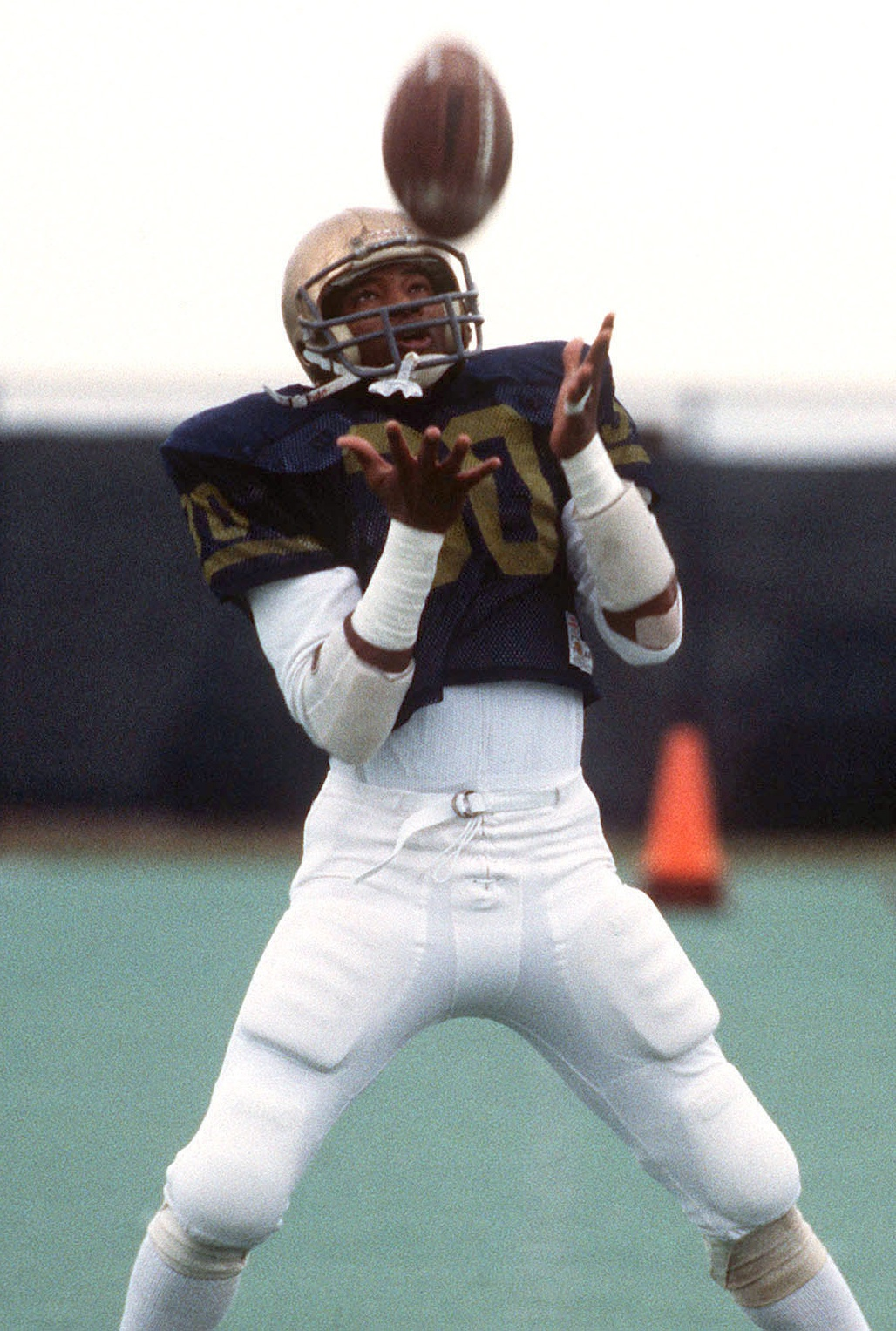
Catching a punt

2. An alternate term for personnel grouping.
pancake
A "pancake block"; sometimes shortened to "cake"; is a particularly effective block where the player being blocked is pushed onto the ground by a blocker, metaphorically "flattening" the opposing defender into a "pancake". This is usually performed by an offensive lineman, tight end, or fullback, and is considered an ideal block, designed to completely eliminate the defender from the play.
pass
An action performed by a player, using their arm to transfer the ball to another player by throwing the ball through the air between them. Every pass is classified as either a forward pass or a lateral pass, depending on the direction the ball travels.
pass attempt
All passes thrown in a game by a player or team, whether complete or incomplete.
pass interference
Also "passing interference" or "PI"; when a player illegally hinders an eligible receiver's, or a defender's opportunity to catch a forward pass beyond five yards of the line of scrimmage.
pass protection
The use of pass blocking by the offensive line, tight ends and various backs to protect the quarterback from being sacked, and to allow the QB time and space to throw the ball.
passer rating
A numeric value used to measure of the performance of quarterbacks. It was formulated in 1973 and it uses the player's completion percentage, passing yards, touchdowns and interceptions.
passing down
A down in which a pass is likely to be attempted
passing play
A play in which a pass is attempted
passing yards
Also "pass yards", "passing yardage", and "yards passing"; the distance in total yards from scrimmage that a passer has thrown the football plus the distance any receivers have run after catching the ball. Passing yards do not include incomplete throws, nor is the actual distance the ball travels through the air measured, as it is measured in flat yards along one direction of the field, always starting from the line of scrimmage and ending at the point that the receiver is ruled down. If the receiver reaches the end zone and scores a touchdown, then the yardage measurement ends at the opposing team's goal line (the zero-yard line). Under NCAA and NFHS (high school) rules, yards lost on sacks are counted in individual (and team) rushing statistics. In the NFL, sack yardage is counted as part of team passing yardage, but is not counted in individual passing statistics.
peel-back block
An action where an offensive player blocks a defender who is moving toward the defender's end zone; such blocks are illegal if delivered below the waist, from the back, or from the side.
personnel grouping
A description of the specific offensive skill position players on the field for a given play; also called a package. Expressed as a two-digit numeric code, with the first digit indicating the number of running backs and the second indicating the number of tight ends. Since normal formations have five linemen and a quarterback, the number of wide receivers is implied to be (5 − first digit − second digit). This means, for example, that "11 personnel" or an "11 package" has one running back, one tight end, and three wide receivers.
pick
An interception of a pass
pick-six
An interception ("pick") that is returned to the passing team's end zone for a touchdown ("six").
pistol formation
A hybrid version of the shotgun in which the quarterback lines up about three yards behind the center and the running back lines up directly behind the quarterback.
place kick
Kicking the ball from where it has been placed stationary on the ground or on a tee.
play
1. See down
2. The plan of action the offensive team has for each snap, for example a running play or pass play
play action
A tactic in which the quarterback fakes either a handoff or a throw in order to draw the defense away from the intended offensive method
play clock
A timer used to limit the length of time between plays. The offensive team must snap the ball before the time expires, or receive a five yard delay of game foul. Currently, the NFL uses 40 seconds (25 seconds after a time out or other administrative stoppage).
playing field
See field of play
pocket
The area on the offensive side of the line of scrimmage between the two offensive tackles, where the pass blockers attempt to prevent the defensive players from reaching the quarterback during passing plays.
pooch kick
A punt or kickoff that is deliberately kicked with less than full force. It is often used in an attempt to limit the ability of the receiving team to return the ball.
Pop Warner Little Scholars
The predominant youth-level (13 years old and younger) football league in the United States. The name "Pop Warner" (or its generic equivalent, "pee wee") can occasionally be used to refer to any youth league, whether or not it is affiliated with the national organization.
possession
1. See drive
2. Physical control of the ball after a pass or fumble
post pattern
A passing route in which the receiver sprints eight to ten yards, fakes a look back at the quarterback, then sprints deep at an angle toward the middle of the field; the opposite pattern is the flag route.
prevent defense
A defensive strategy that utilizes deep zone coverage in order to prevent a big pass play from happening downfield, usually at the expense of giving up yards at shorter distances. Often used against "hail Mary" plays, or at the end of the game when the defending team is protecting a lead.
pro set
Offensive formation using two backs, lined up side-by-side two or three yards behind the quarterback, with one on either side of the quarterback
pulling
A pulling blocker is an offensive lineman who, instead of blocking the player in front of them, steps back from the line (pulls away from the line) and runs to block a defender, usually in a trap or sweep play.
pump fake
When the quarterback fakes a pass and keeps the ball in their hand in an attempt to fool the defensive team.
punt
A kick in which the ball is dropped and kicked before it reaches the ground. Used to give up the ball to the opposition after offensive downs have been used, as far down the field as possible.
punt return
When a punt is fielded by the receiving team and advanced for better field position. The punt returner generally attempts to move the ball as far up the field as possible. Alternatively, they can signal for a fair catch or allow the ball to go into the end zone for a touchback. A receiver can also immediately punt the ball back, though this option is not used in modern football.
punter
A kicker who specializes in punting as opposed to place kicking

== Q ==
quarter
One of four periods of play in a standard American football game. A quarter lasts for 15 game clock minutes in most adaptations of American football but may take longer in elapsed time, since the clock does not run continuously. A tie at the end of four quarters results in overtime.
quarterback
An offensive player who lines up behind the center, and takes the snap
quarterback controversy
A dilemma where a team has not settled on one conventional starting quarterback, whether by seeing two quarterbacks split time between games or between overall snaps.
quarterback rating
See passer rating
quarterback scramble
See scramble
quarterback sneak
A play most commonly used in very short yardage or goal line situations. The quarterback quickly takes the snap and runs right behind or beside the center.
quarter defense
A defensive formation with seven defensive backs, three down linemen and one linebacker
quick kick
An unexpected punt

== R ==
receiving yards
The amount of yards from scrimmage a player gains on each reception.
reception
When a player catches (receives) the ball past the line of scrimmage. If a reception is made behind the line of scrimmage, it is a lateral. Another name for a catch.
red flag
A weighted red marker thrown onto the field by a coach to tell the officials that they want a certain play reviewed; sometimes referred to as a "challenge flag".
red zone
The area between the 20-yard line and the goal of the defensive team. The area is not literally colored red and the term is used mainly for statistical purposes; a team that has a high "red zone percentage" (number of touchdowns scored from within the red zone divided by number of drives in which the team enters the red zone) is capable of finishing drives with touchdowns on a regular basis.
redshirt
A college player who is forgoing a season to retain a year of eligibility. Student athletes have five years to play four after they enroll. A sixth year is occasionally granted to a player to play his or her four years under extenuating circumstances.
restraining line
1. A team's respective line of scrimmage
2. On a free kick, the line the ball is to be kicked from (for the kicking team), or a line 10 yards (five yards in the NFL, beginning 2011) in advance of that (for the receiving team)
return
The act of progressing the ball down the field after a change of possession, such as a kick or interception
return yards
Yards gained advancing the ball during play after a change of possession such as a punt or a kickoff or a turnover such as a fumble or an interception
reverse
An offensive play in which a running back carries the ball toward one side of the field but hands or tosses the ball to a teammate (almost exclusively a wide receiver) who is running in the opposite direction. This is slightly different from an end around, in which the ball is handed off directly to a wide receiver (usually the man in motion), so the direction of the play never reverses.
RPO
Run-pass option
rover
A hybrid safety that has dual responsibilities as a defensive back and a linebacker. This is more commonly seen in college football than in NFL, CFL, or AFL football. An example of this in use is in West Virginia's and Air Force's 3–3–5 schemes.
run and shoot
An offensive philosophy in football designed to force the defense to show its hand prior to the snap of the ball by splitting up receivers and sending them in motion. Receivers run patterns based on the play of the defenders, rather than a predetermined plan. Also known as "run and gun".
run-pass option
Plays where the quarterback has the option to run or pass
running back
A player position on offense. Although the term usually refers to a halfback or tailback, fullbacks are also considered running backs.
running out the clock
A game strategy that involves repeatedly executing simple plays that allow the game clock to continue running in an effort to bring the game to a quicker end. This strategy is almost always employed by the leading team at the end of the game, and may involve one or more kneels.
running play
A play where the offense attempts to advance the ball without a forward pass.
running up the score
The act of continuing to put full effort into scoring and keeping the starting lineup in the game even well after a team's lead has grown to be effectively insurmountable. In most cases, such behavior is considered bad sportsmanship and an injury risk.
rush
1. An attempt to tackle or hurry a player before they can throw a pass or make a kick
2. A running play
rushing average or yards per carry average
The quotient of a player's total rushing yards divided by the number of rushing attempts.
rushing yards
The amount of yards from scrimmage a player gains on each rush.

== S ==
sack
Tackling a ball carrier who intends to throw a forward pass. A sack is also awarded if a player forces a fumble of the ball, or the ball carrier goes out of bounds, behind the line of scrimmage on an apparent intended forward pass play. The term gained currency circa 1970.
safety
1. A player position on defense. See free safety and strong safety.
2. A method of scoring (worth two points) by downing an opposing ball carrier in his own end zone, forcing the opposing ball carrier out of his own end zone and out of bounds, or forcing the offensive team to fumble the ball so that it exits the end zone. A safety is also awarded if the offensive team commits a foul within its own end zone. After a safety, the team that was scored upon must kick the ball to the scoring team from its own 20-yard line.
In the unusual event of a safety occurring during a try for an extra point or two points after a touchdown, this scores only one point and is followed by a kickoff as after any other try. (In some codes, the rules allow the defense in addition to the offense to score in this fashion.)
safety valve
A receiver whose job it is to get open for a short pass in case all other receivers are covered.
Sam
The strong side outside linebacker
scoop and score
A play in which a defensive player recovers a fumble by picking up the ball off the ground ("scooping" the ball) and then runs to the opposing end zone for a touchdown ("scoring").
scorigami
A unique score combination that has never occurred in the history of the league or level of play. Not strictly unique to American football, but the game's discrete scoring system means that certain score combinations are so improbable that they have yet to be achieved.
scout team
During practices, the portion of the team that attempts to emulate the play style of the upcoming opponent based on scouting reports, so the rest of the team can anticipate the opponent's play calls and defense. Often includes players on the team's practice squad, or backups playing out of position to better emulate a unique opposing player's skill set. In exceptional cases, teams may sign an outside player familiar with an upcoming opponent's system to serve as a scout team player (especially in the cases of quarterbacks), then release him after the game.
scramble
On a called passing play, when the quarterback runs from the pocket in an attempt to avoid being sacked, giving the receivers more time to get open or attempting to gain positive yards by running.
screen pass
A short forward pass to a receiver who has blockers in front. The receiver in this play is usually a running back, although wide receiver and tight end screens are also used. Although they are both called screen passes, the wide receiver screen and the running back screen are used for very different reasons. In the case of a running back screen, the play is designed to allow the pass rushers by the offensive linemen, leaving the defender out of position to make a play. The play is usually employed to defuse the pass rush in the case of a running back screen. The wide receiver screen is a much faster developing play, designed to catch the defense off guard.
scrimmage
1. An informal practice matchup, either between two teams or between different units of the same team. Usually score is not kept; often, each team will get 10 plays from the same yard line. Sometimes played "seven on seven", with a full backfield and an abbreviated offensive line.
2. Play from scrimmage
3. Line of scrimmage
secondary
Refers to the defensive "backfield", specifically the safeties and cornerbacks. Primarily responsible for pass coverage defense.
series
A sequence of downs, beginning with a first down and including all subsequent downs until a new first down, score, or change of possession. A typical drive consists of multiple series.
shift
When two or more offensive players move at the same time before the snap. All players who move in a shift must come to a complete stop prior to the snap.
shooting
The action of a linebacker or defensive back to blitz
shotgun formation
A formation in which the quarterback receives the snap 5–8 yards behind the center.
side zone
The area between a hash mark and a sideline
single wing
A diverse set of formations, now out of fashion but highly popular between 1906 and World War II, that typically used an unbalanced line, direct snap, and one wingback.
single wing(ed)-T
A formation with one wingback and an adjoining tight end in which the center hands the ball to the quarterback, who holds their hands between the legs of the center.
slant
A receiver route. In the slant route, a receiver runs straight upfield a few yards, plants their outside foot hard while in full stride, and turns 45 degrees towards the quarterback. A staple of the West Coast offense (WCO) and the player may go as few as two yards or as many as six yards before moving inside for the pass. Variations include the quick slant in which the player plants and turns at the snap instead of running ahead first and the slow or zone route, in which the receiver runs 10 to 15 yards downfield to get behind the linebackers before turning.
slot
The area between a split end and the rest of the offensive line. A pass receiver lined up in the slot at the snap of the ball may be called a slotback or slot receiver.
smashmouth offense
An offensive strategy that relies on a strong running game, where most of the offensive plays are handoffs to the fullback or the tailback. It is a more traditional style of offense that often results in a higher time of possession by running the ball heavily. Even though the offense is run-oriented, passing opportunities can develop as defenses play close to the line of scrimmage.
snap
The handoff or pass from the center that begins a play from scrimmage
sneak
An offensive play in which the quarterback, immediately on receiving the snap dives forward with the ball. The play is used when a team needs a very short gain to reach either the goal line or the line to gain.
special teams
The units that handle kickoffs, punts, free kicks and field goal attempts. Often made up of second- and third-team players.
spike
A play in which the quarterback throws the ball directly into the ground. Technically an incomplete pass, it stops the clock and sacrifices a down. Running a spike play presumes there will be at least one play by the same team immediately afterward, so it would not be done on fourth down or if it would run the clock out (the clock is probably running while the teams are lining up for the play). Spiking is only legal if it is done immediately by a player lined under center upon receiving the snap while the game clock is running.
spiral
The continuous lateral rotation of the football following its release from the hand of a passer or punter. It is often described in terms of tightness; a tight spiral is one where the endpoints of the ball continuously stay on the trajectory of the pass without wobbling throughout the pass or punt.
split-T
T formation in which the gaps between offensive guards and tackles are nearly twice as large as the gaps between the center and the guards
split end
A player position on offense. A receiver who lines up on the line of scrimmage, several yards outside the interior offensive linemen. The term is now rarely used in American football, having been long since replaced by the wide receiver or wideout, with no distinction between whether the receiver is on the line or not.
spot
The location determined by the official where the ball was downed or blown dead
spread offense
An offensive scheme that is used at every level of American and Canadian football, including professional (NFL, CFL), college, (NCAA, NAIA, U Sports), and high school programs across the U.S. and Canada. Spread offenses typically place the quarterback in the shotgun formation, and "spread" the defense horizontally using three-, four-, and even five-receiver sets. Many spread offenses utilize the read option running play to put pressure on both sides of the defense. Spread offenses also leverage vertical (down field) passing routes to spread the defense vertically, thereby opening up multiple vertical seams for both the running and passing game.
sprint football
A form of football in which all players must be below the weight of the average college student; the game is played at a select few colleges. Weight limits are also present in most youth football leagues.
squib kick
A type of kickoff in which the ball is intentionally kicked low to the ground, typically bouncing on the ground a few times before being picked up. This is done in the hopes of preventing a long return, as the ball is often picked up by one of the upmen as opposed to the dedicated kickoff returners; it can also be used to force the return team to play the ball and run time off the clock as opposed to allowing a touchback or fair catch.
starter
A player who is the first to play their position within a given game or season. Depending on the position and the game situation, a starter may be replaced or share time with one or more players later in the game. As an example, a quarterback may start the game but be replaced by a backup quarterback if the game becomes one-sided. A running-back may start the game but share time with another running back in specific situations or to provide the opportunity for rest during the game.
sticks
The pole attached to the end of the chain that is used by the chain crew to measure for a new series of downs, i.e. the line to gain a new "first down".
stiff-arm
A ball carrier warding off a would-be tackler by pushing them away with a straight arm.
string
A grouping of players, ranked by an ordinal numeral identifying their place on the depth chart. The starting lineup is the first string; backups and situational players constitute the second string. Third stringers are typically players who primarily play special teams. In situations with large rosters (such as college football and the NFL preseason), there may be enough players for a fourth string.
strip
To remove the football from the player carrying it
strip sack
A sack causing the quarterback to fumble the ball
strong I
A formation wherein the tailback is lined up deep directly behind the quarterback, and the fullback is lined up offset to the strong side of the formation.
strong safety
A kind of safety on defense, as opposed to a free safety. This is a central defensive back; originally, the term indicated the lining up on the strong side of the field and covering the tight end. However, the modern usage of the term now indicates a central defensive back with responsibility for run and pass support, slightly favoring run support.
strong side
The side of the field (left or right) that has the most players, but depends on the formations of the teams. When a team uses one tight end, the strong side is the side of the field where the tight end lines up. If the offensive package uses no tight end, or more than one tight end, the strong side is the side of the field with the most offensive players on or just behind the line of scrimmage, assuming a balanced line. If the offense uses an unbalanced line, the strong side is the side with the most linemen.
stuff
A tackle of a ball carrier on a running play, behind the line of scrimmage. Compare to sack.
stunt
A tactic used by defensive linemen in which they switch roles in an attempt to get past the blockers. Both defenders will start with power rushes, with the stunting defender getting more of a push. The other lineman will then go around, ideally using the player as a pick to get free from blockers.
sweep
A running play in which several blockers lead a running back on a designed play to the outside. Depending on the number of blockers and the design of the play this is sometimes referred to as a "power sweep" or "student-body-right" (or left).

== T ==
T formation
A classic offensive formation with the quarterback directly behind the center and three running backs behind the quarterback, forming a T. Numerous variations have been developed including the split-T, wing-T, and wishbone-T.

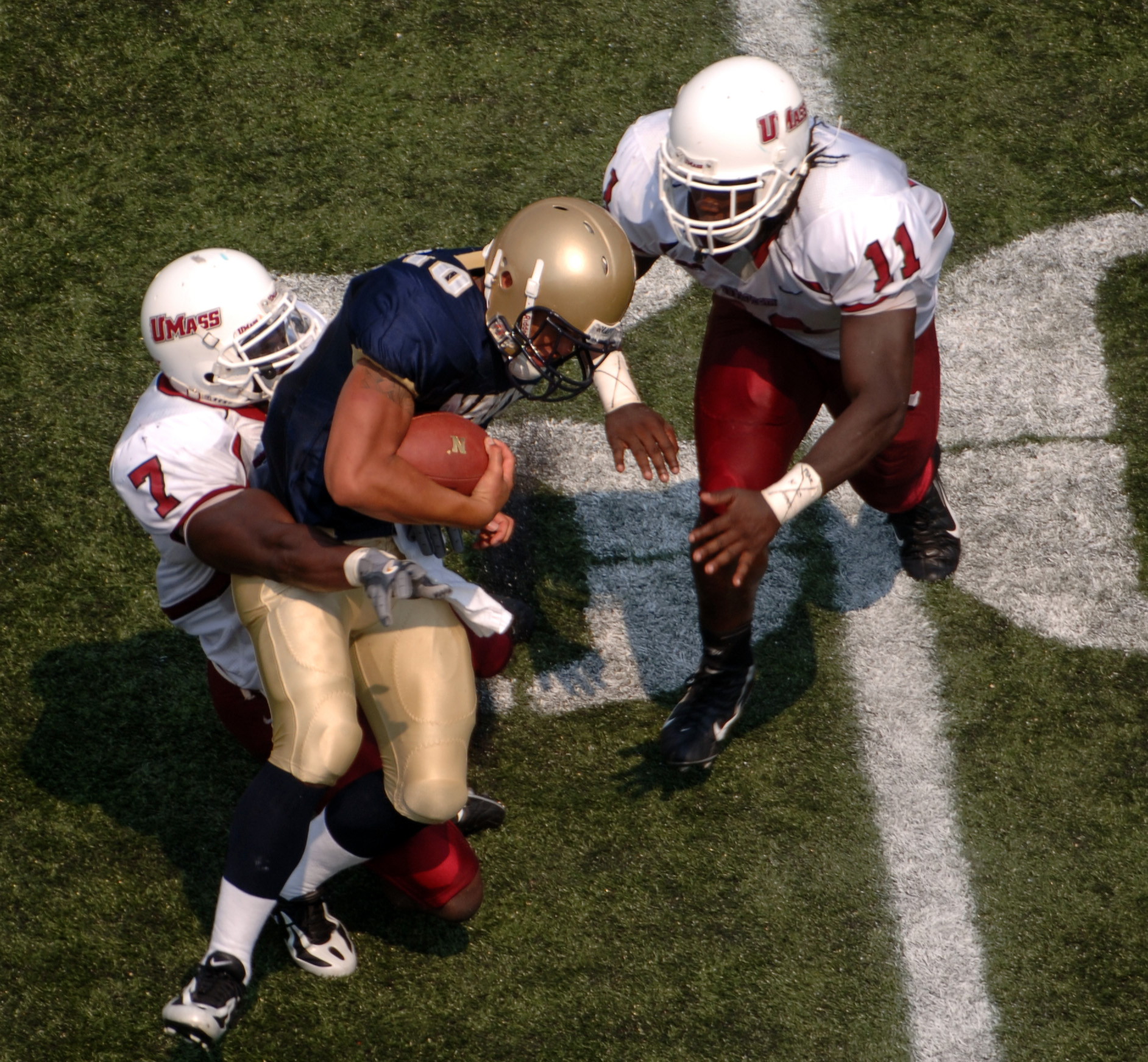
The players in white (No. 7 and No. 11) are tackling the ball carrier (No. 10)

tackle
1. The act of forcing a ball carrier to the ground
2. A player position on the line, either an offensive tackle (T) or a defensive tackle (DT). See lineman.
tackle box
The area between where the two offensive tackles line up prior to the snap
tackle-eligible
A lineman that lines up in the position of an eligible receiver
tackle-for-loss
A tackle that causes a loss of yardage for the opposing running back or wide receiver. This happens when the quarterback is sacked, when either a rusher or a receiver is tackled behind the line of scrimmage, or when the ball is fumbled behind the line of scrimmage and was picked up by an offensive player who does not manage to move past the line before being tackled.
tailback
Player position on offense farthest ("deepest") back, except in kicking formations. Also often referred to as the running back, particularly in a one-back offense.
take a knee
See kneel
target
As a verb, to direct a pass to a given receiver. As a noun, a statistic measuring the number of times a given receiver has had a pass intended for them.
thicc six
A touchdown by an offensive or defensive lineman.
three-and-out
When an offensive team fails to gain a first down on the first three plays of a drive, and thus is forced to punt on fourth down
three-point conversion
A novelty developed in the new millennium, used in leagues such as the XFL and the Stars Football League (and later proposed but rejected as a test by the Canadian Football League in 2015), that is nearly identical to the two-point conversion. A play that advances the ball into the end zone from the 10-yard line (as opposed to the 2- or 3-yard line in a two-point conversion) earns three points.
three-point stance
A down lineman's stance with three points on the ground, in other words, two feet and one hand
tight end
A player position on offense, often known as Y receiver, lines up on the line of scrimmage, next to the offensive tackle. Tight ends are used as blockers during running plays, and either run a route or stay in to block during passing plays.
time of possession (TOP)
The amount of time one team has the ball in its possession relative to the other team. Since there are 60 minutes in a non-overtime game, and one team or another always has possession of the ball, the two teams divide up the time with which they have the ball out of the 60 minutes. If one team has it 40 minutes the other will have it 20 and so forth. A time of possession advantage is seen as a positive thing and is highly correlative with a win or loss as it usually means the opponent's defense becomes fatigued and easier to gain yardage on late in games. Teams that dominate time of possession usually have good defenses (that can keep the opposing team's offense from mounting many long drives) and solid offenses (usually with good running games as running plays keep the clock running more often than passing plays). Teams that have a big disadvantage in the time of possession usually give up several third down conversions or frequently go three-and-out on offense.
total offense
A statistic that combines yards rushing and yards passing
touchback
The act of downing the ball behind one's own goal line on a kickoff or punt after the ball had been propelled over the goal by the opposing team. This can be accomplished by one of several ways: the receiving team player catching the ball in the end zone and dropping down to one knee; by the ball touching any part of the end zone; the ball carrying out of the end zone in any way without being possessed by either team. After a touchback, the team that downed it gets the ball at their own 20-yard line in most situations. Touchbacks on kickoffs are placed on the 20 under high school rules, but the 25 under NCAA and NFL rules.
touchdown
A play worth six points, accomplished by gaining legal possession of the ball in the opponent's end zone or by the ball crossing the plane of the opponent's goal line with legal possession by a player. It also allows the team a chance for one extra point by kicking the ball or a two-point conversion; see try.
trap
A basic blocking pattern in which a defensive lineman is allowed past the line of scrimmage, only to be blocked at an angle by a "pulling" lineman. Designed to gain a preferred blocking angle and larger hole in the line.
trick play
Also gadget play; any of a variety of plays that use deception to catch the other team off-guard. Famous trick plays include the fake punt or kick, the "Statue of Liberty", the flea-flicker, center-eligible, surprise on-side kick and running back pass plays. These plays are often very risky.
trips
A formation in which three wide receivers are lined up on the same side of the field, with one on the LOS and usually the others flanking the WR one yard off the LOS, as in slot or wing, though only one yard off the WR, each way.
true freshman
A player who is one year out of high school. This contrasts with a redshirt freshman who has practiced with the team for one year but who has seen little or no play. (Under current NCAA Division I rules, a player does not lose redshirt status until appearing in more than four games in that season; conference championship games, bowl games, and playoff games do not count against that limit.)
try
A try is a scrimmage down which is neither timed nor numbered, awarded to a team who has just scored a 6-point touchdown, from close to their opponent's goal line (2-yard line in the NFL for regular scrimmage plays, 15-yard line in the NFL for place kicks, 3-yard line NCAA & NFHS in all situations). The try allows the offense (and in some codes, the defense) to score an additional one or two points. Also called "try-for-point", "conversion", "convert" (Canadian), "extra point(s)", "point(s) after (touchdown)" or PAT. Derived from the rugby term of the same name, although in rugby, the term "try" refers to the actual event corresponding to the American touchdown, not the event that comes afterward as in the American game.
turn the ball over on downs
When a team uses all four of their downs without either scoring or making a first down, they must relinquish the ball to the other team.
turnover
The loss of the ball by one team to the other team. This is usually the result of a fumble or an interception.
two-level defense
A defense with only two, as opposed to the usual three, levels of defensive organization. Generally a much more aggressive defense than normal.
two-minute warning
A free time out given to both teams when there are two minutes left on the game clock in each half. Certain leagues use different times for this warning.
two-point conversion
A play worth two points accomplished by gaining legal possession of the ball in the opponent's end zone, either via a run or pass, after a touchdown has been made; see try.

== U ==
unbalanced line
Usually refers to an offensive formation which does not have an equal number of linemen on each side of the ball. Done to gain a blocking advantage on one side of the formation; typically one tackle or guard lines up on the other side of the ball. For example a common alignment would be E-G-C-G-T-T-E.
under center
Refers to the quarterback lining up directly behind the center to take the snap. The person under center is considered ineligible in the NFL, but an eligible receiver in the NCAA and high school, though this distinction rarely manifests itself since the person under center usually is the passer. Contrast with shotgun formation.
upback
A player, in a scrimmage kick (punts and field goals) or kneel formations, who lines up behind the offensive line. An upback's primary duty is to block oncoming defensive players in a kick formation and to recover any fumbles in a kneel formation. They can receive direct snaps, and are eligible receivers.
upman
During a kickoff, every player on the return team is called an "upman" with the exception of the one or two designated kickoff returners, who stand furthest away from the starting point of the kicking team.
utility player
A player capable of playing multiple positions

== V ==
veer
A type of option offense using two backs in the backfield, one behind each guard or tackle (referred to as split backs), allowing a triple option play (give to either back or quarterback keep).

== W ==
waived/injured
Before NFL rosters are reduced to 53 players for the regular season, any injured non-vested veteran (defined as a player with less than four years of experience) has to be placed on waivers before being placed on injured reserve. If the waived/injured player is not claimed by another team, then they are placed on the injured reserve of the team that waived them. Once rosters are reduced to 53 players, non-vested veterans can be placed on injured reserve without having to be placed on waivers.
walk-on
In college, a non-scholarship player. I.e., a player who is not receiving a scholarship to play football
weak I
A formation wherein the tailback is lined up deep directly behind the quarterback, and the fullback is lined up offset to the weak side of the formation
weak side
When one tight end is used, the side of the field opposite the tight end. In other offensive packages, the side of the field with the fewest offensive players on or just behind the line of scrimmage.
West Coast offense
An offensive philosophy that uses short, high-percentage passes as the core of a ball-control offense. It was invented by the Cincinnati Bengals under coach Paul Brown and assistant coach Bill Walsh in the early/mid-1970s. It is now widely used in the NFL, but it was originally made popular by Walsh when he was head coach of the San Francisco 49ers. The original West Coast offense may have been a term used by Don Coryell, as a Sports Illustrated article confused Coryell's title with the offense being used by Walsh, thus possibly coining the term. (Coryell's offense was known instead as air Coryell through the 1980s.) The basis of Walsh's offense is to use short routes for receivers, delivering the ball on time and accurately and using short passes to replace runs. It relies heavily on yardage from running after the catch, using many eligible receivers on plays to maximize quarterback options, and spreading the ball to many targets to keep the defense confused.
wheel route
A pass route in which the receiver, often a running back, travels parallel along the line of scrimmage and then takes off up the field
wide receiver
A player position on offense who is split wide (usually about 10 yards) from the formation and plays on the line of scrimmage as a split end (X) or one yard off as a flanker (Z). The offensive-formation rules regarding the number of backs and linemen are still used.
wildcat offense
An offensive philosophy that dictates that either a quarterback or a running back can receive a direct snap from the snapper; it is often compared to the single wing. Originally invented by Billy Ford and Ryan Wilson and named after the Kansas State University mascot, the wildcat was first employed by head coach Bill Snyder. Recent use of the wildcat has been attributed to Gus Malzahn (currently the head coach at the University of Central Florida, but best known for his tenure at Auburn University, formerly at Tulsa and Arkansas where he made the formation famous with star backs Felix Jones and Darren McFadden.)
Will
The weak side linebacker.
wing back or wingback (WB)
A player position in some offensive formations (flexbone). Lines up just outside the tight end and one yard off the line of scrimmage. A versatile position that can be used as a receiver, blocker, or runner of reverses.
wishbone
A formation involving three running backs lined up behind the quarterback in the shape of a Y, similar to the shape of a wishbone

== X ==
X-receiver
Used in offensive play calling, usually referring to the split end, the wide receiver who lines up on the line of scrimmage. For example, "split right jet 529 X post" tells the X-receiver to run a post route.

== Y ==
YAC
1. Yards after catch – the amount of yardage gained after initial catch. A quarterback's length of pass is the distance from where the line of scrimmage is, to where the receiver caught the ball. YAC is the distance the ball carrier ran after the initial catch.
2. Yards after contact – the amount of yardage gained by an offensive player after the first defensive player makes contact
Y-receiver
1. A designation used in play calling for the offense's third receiver in a play. This is usually either the slot receiver or the tight end, depending on the play. For example, "buffalo right 534 boot Y corner" tells the Y-receiver to run a corner route.
2. The offense's primary tight end in a play
yard line
A marking on the field that indicates the distance (in yards) to the nearest goal line
yardage
The number of yards gained or lost during a play, game, season, or career
yards gained
See yardage
yards from scrimmage
The number of yards gained by the offensive team advancing the ball from the line of scrimmage
yellow flag
See flag

== Z ==
Z-receiver
Used in offensive-play calling, usually referring to the flanker, the wide receiver who lines up off the line of scrimmage. For example, "panther gun 85 slant Z go" tells the Z-receiver to run a go (also called a fly or streak) route.
zone defense
A defense in which players are in pass-coverage zones of the field, instead of covering individual players. Pure zone packages are seldom used; most defenses employ some combination of zone and man coverage.
zone blitz
A defensive package combining a blitz with zone-pass coverage. Allows the defense to choose the blitzer after the offense shows formation and pass-coverage requirements, and features unpredictable blitzes from different linebackers and defensive backs. Invented by coach Dick LeBeau.
zone read
A type of option offense where the quarterback and the tailback line up approximately side-by-side. After the quarterback receives the snap, the two players cross paths and go through the motions of a hand-off. Based upon reading the defensive reaction, the quarterback either completes the handoff or pulls the ball out and runs with it.

== See also ==
- American football positions
- American football strategy
- Comparison of American and Canadian football
- Glossary of Canadian football
- List of NFL nicknames

== Sources ==
- Hickok, Ralph (1977). New Encyclopedia or Sports. New York: McGraw-Hill, Inc. ISBN 0070287058
