= Pistol-Flex formation =

American football hybrid offensive formation

Pistol-Flex or Pistol Double-Slot is a hybrid of two well-known American football formations: the pistol and flexbone formations. It was pioneered in 2009 by Paul Markowski, who is currently an offensive consultant for Chestnut Hill College. By combining the strengths of each offensive set, the result is a formation that is very effective for both passing and running. The triple option can be used from this set very effectively. Markowski has developed a true quadruple option play run out of the Pistol-Flex formation.

The base formation of the Pistol-Flex has the QB in a shotgun set four yards behind the center. The B-back is in a three-point stance with his down hand two yards behind the QB's feet. The two slotbacks are set one yard directly behind the offensive tackles to their side. The offensive line splits are all three feet. There are multiple formations that the Pistol-Flex can be run from (Open, Tight, Bone, Box, Twins).

At any given time, there are at least four eligible receivers within one yard of the line of scrimmage, which bodes well for the passing attack.
