= Stunt (gridiron football) =

Maneuver in gridiron football

A stunt in American football and Canadian football, sometimes called a twist, is a planned maneuver by a pair of players of the defensive team by which they exchange roles to better slip past blockers of the offensive team at the beginning of a play, in order to better rush the passer.

The purpose of a stunt is to confuse opposing blockers, which is an aid to the defense in rushing an opposing forward pass or kick. The main weakness of a stunt is that it is more vulnerable than average to running plays by the opposing team. In most cases, the defense will not use a play incorporating stunting if it expects a running play from the offense.

There are two main types of stunts. In one, a line player, who would otherwise try to charge forward, instead drops back, and a nearby linebacker or defensive back charges forward instead. In the other, which is known as cross-rushing, line players, instead of charging straight ahead, cross paths. One of them may follow a looping path that goes behind the other before moving forward (in which case the stunt is called a "loop"), or one may wait for the other to penetrate slightly first, and then cross behind, their paths angling across each other. In some variants, a rushing player will run around more than one rushing teammate.

Because of the exchange of roles, a stunt is sometimes called a "trade"; blockers of the offensive team may engage in similar "trades". The defensive players involved are said to be stunting or trading, or sometimes to "have a game on".

The name "stunt" presumably derives from its more general meaning of a showy trick. The term has been used in a football context since at least the 1960s. However, the maneuver itself dates back to the 19th century. Walter Camp wrote of role exchanges between a line player and a "line-half" (then the nomenclature for what is now called a linebacker; presumably a cross between lineman and halfback, or a halfback playing behind the line; cf. "scrum-half" in rugby) in efforts to block a kick from scrimmage, forward passes not yet having become legal.
