= Stance (gridiron football) =

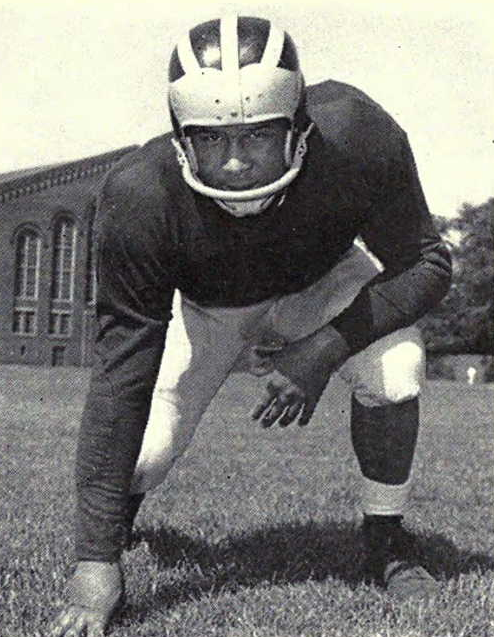
Donald R. Deskins in a three-point stance.

Stance is the position a gridiron football player adopts when a play begins. There are three common stances used by linemen: two-point, three-point, and four-point. The stance names reference the number of points where a player's body is touching the ground while down in the stance. Each technique has its own strengths and weaknesses; therefore, each one is used accordingly in different situations. Furthermore, stances are taught and used differently depending on the level of competition (little league football, high school football, college football, etc.).

== Overview ==
In the National Football League (NFL), the average amount of plays per game is over 60 per team. This means that, in one game, a lineman playing the entire time could enter a stance more than 60 times. However, it is not likely to be the same stance every time. Furthermore, it is important to remember that the offensive team must remain still for one second prior to the ball being snapped. This means that once an offensive player has become set in a stance, he must stay in it until the ball is snapped and the play begins. Additional motion can result in a false start penalty. Defensive players, on the other hand, are permitted to shift as much as they want before a play. It is possible for a defensive lineman to line up in one stance and then change to another just before the play begins. He can even shift his body to another place.

== Two-point stance ==
The two-point variation is the most upright stance. Another name for the stance is the universal stance. The two-point is used by offensive linemen to facilitate better pass blocking because it increases their initial field of vision and gives more reaction time (to stay in front of a rushing player). Consequently, it is usually only used in a situation that will require passing. Some defensive linemen employ this stance to pass rush because they naturally obtain more quickness and agility out of it (particularly the defensive ends).

=== Technique ===
The "two-points" on the ground in this stance are just the feet. They are placed shoulder width apart pointing forward. One of the feet is staggered back, for an offensive-lineman this will be the foot away from the ball; for a defensive-lineman it will be the foot towards the ball. While in this stance the player's center of gravity will be slightly lowered by bending at the knees and waist. Weight is kept away from the heels to promote quickness and agility out of the stance in any direction.

== Three-point stance ==
The most common variation is the three-point stance. The purpose of this stance is to give the player leverage and allow more of their legs' power to be used. This is the offensive lineman's most used stance. It allows them to easily stay low and move in any direction at the snap of the ball. The interior defensive lineman use this stance for the same reason; however, it is usually slightly adjusted.

=== Technique ===
The added "point" is the player's strong hand on the ground (the down-hand). In higher divisions of play, ambidexterity between down-hands is required. A player entering the stance begins in a two-point stance; the player's staggered foot will be on the same side as the down-hand. The player then bends the knees and waist until the thighs and back are nearly parallel to the ground. The down-hand is merely an anchoring point for offensive linemen; typically, very little weight is put onto it. Offensive linemen may have to move in any direction so it is counterproductive to put weight on their down-hand (this only facilitates forward movement.) However, defensive players usually put more weight on their down-hand to have a more explosive start as they almost always go forward. This gives them the power of their legs coupled with forward momentum for a stronger push.

== Four-point stance ==
The least common variation is the four-point stance. This stance is used for maximum explosion and leverage in one direction (straight ahead of the player). Offensive linemen will typically only use it if they need to force the line forward only inches. Interior defensive linemen will use it to keep this push from happening.

=== Technique ===
The added "point" in this stance is the other arm. It is simply a three-point with the other hand put down. However, the hands in this case are allowed as much of the body's weight as the feet.

== Proposed bans ==
The three-point stance has become a staple in every football game. However, this has drawn attention to the danger it puts players in. The NFL has gained a bad reputation because of the players' long-term and sometimes life-threatening complications brought about by head injuries. The NFL's commissioner, Roger Goodell, has stated the possibility of banning the three-point stance because it makes linemen more likely to initiate head-to-head contact.
