= Pass rush =

American football defensive maneuver

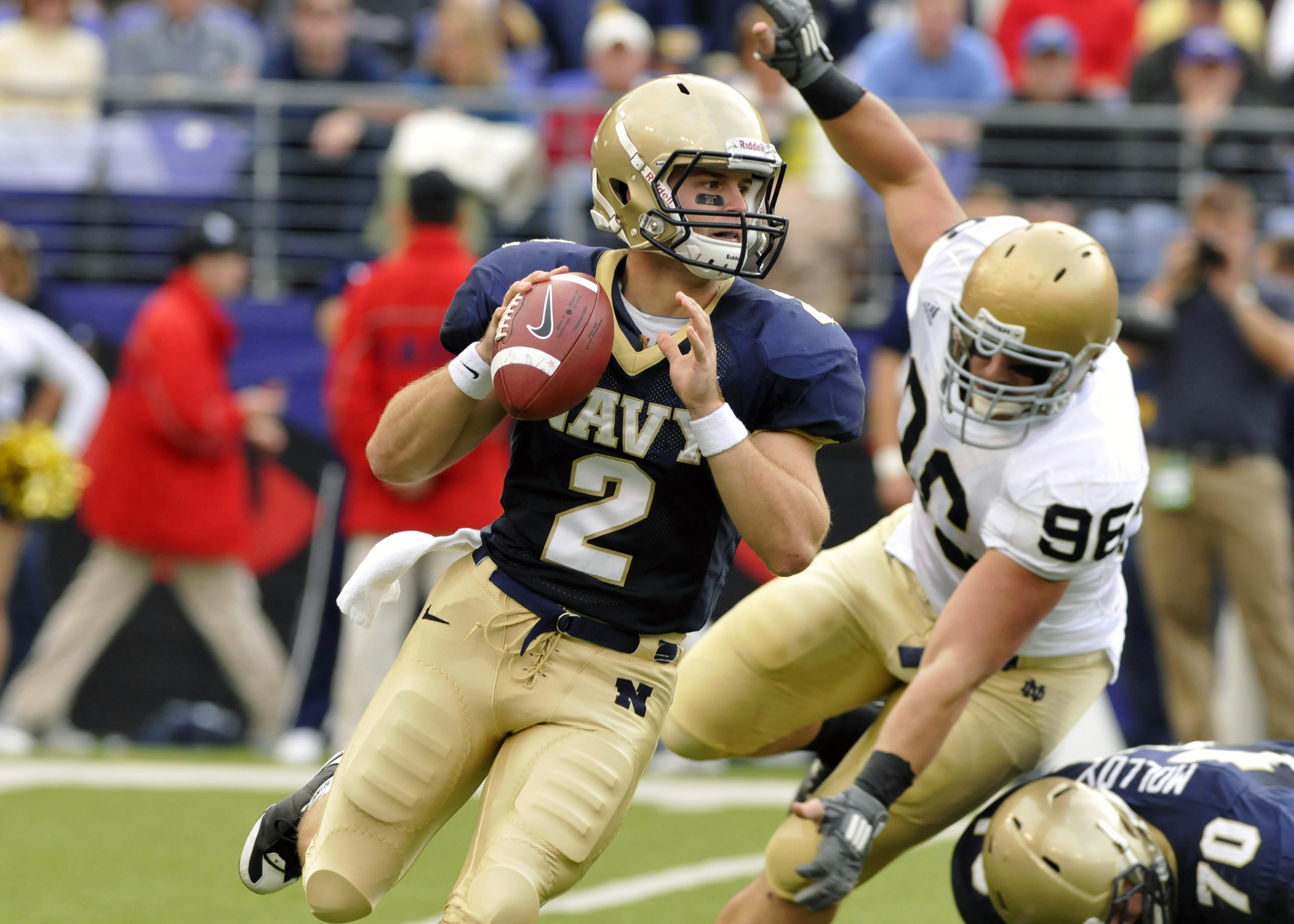
A quarterback eludes a rushing defender.

On defense in gridiron football, a pass rush is charging across the line of scrimmage towards the quarterback in an effort to stop or "sack" him. The purpose is tackling, hurrying or flushing the quarterback out of his protective pocket or the play's design.

"Pressures" and "hurries" are terms used to describe pass rushes which successfully alter a quarterback's performance on a play — forcing them to throw before they find their best target or scramble out of the pocket to elude being tackled — that fall short of completed sacks.

A related form of defensive rush is to disrupt or sack a kicker attempting to kick a field goal, extra point, or punt the ball. On offense, "rushing" is to run forward with the ball to gain yardage.

In both college and professional football, getting a strong pass rush is an important skill, as even an average quarterback can be productive if he has enough time to find an open receiver, even against a good secondary. To increase pressure, teams will sometimes use a pass-rushing specialist, who is usually a quick, strong defensive end or outside linebacker tasked with aggressively rushing the quarterback in obvious passing situations.

== Methods ==
One of the most effective methods of rushing the passer is by using a stunt or twist, which is when defensive players quickly change positions at the snap of the ball and engage a different blocker than the offense expected. Defenses typically task three or four defensive lineman to rush the passer on most plays, but most will occasionally increase pressure by blitzing one or more non-linemen at the quarterback when a pass play is anticipated.

A pass rush can be effective even if it does not sack the quarterback if it forces the passer to get rid of the ball before he wanted to, resulting in an incomplete pass or interception. To attack a strong pass rush, offenses can throw quicker short passes or run draw plays or screen passes, which are design to lure defenders into the offensive backfield and then quickly get a ball carrier behind them.

== History ==
A pass rush has gained increasing importance in the game as it has evolved from a run-only offense to one that relies ever more heavily on the forward pass for gaining yardage and scoring points. Exceptional pass rushers began to gain widespread media attention starting in the 1960s. Longtime Los Angeles Ram defensive end Deacon Jones is credited with coining the term "sack", and historically attributed with 173 1/2 sacks, which would rank him #3 all-time behind all-time leader Bruce Smith (with 200) and Reggie White (198) had they been counted as an official statistic during his career. The single-season record is (23), held by Myles Garrett.

Other formidable historic pass rushers include Lawrence Taylor (#14, 132 1/2), the highest ranking pure linebacker, and Jim Katcavage, NFL leader in 1962 and 1963, a defensive tackle. The active leader (as of 2025) is outside linebacker/defensive end Von Miller with 138 1/2. Other notable active players include Defensive Player of the Year and 2022 season leader Nick Bosa, a defensive end; and 2021 Defensive Player of the Year and three-time season leader T. J. Watt, an outside linebacker.
