= Three-point stance =

Stance in American football

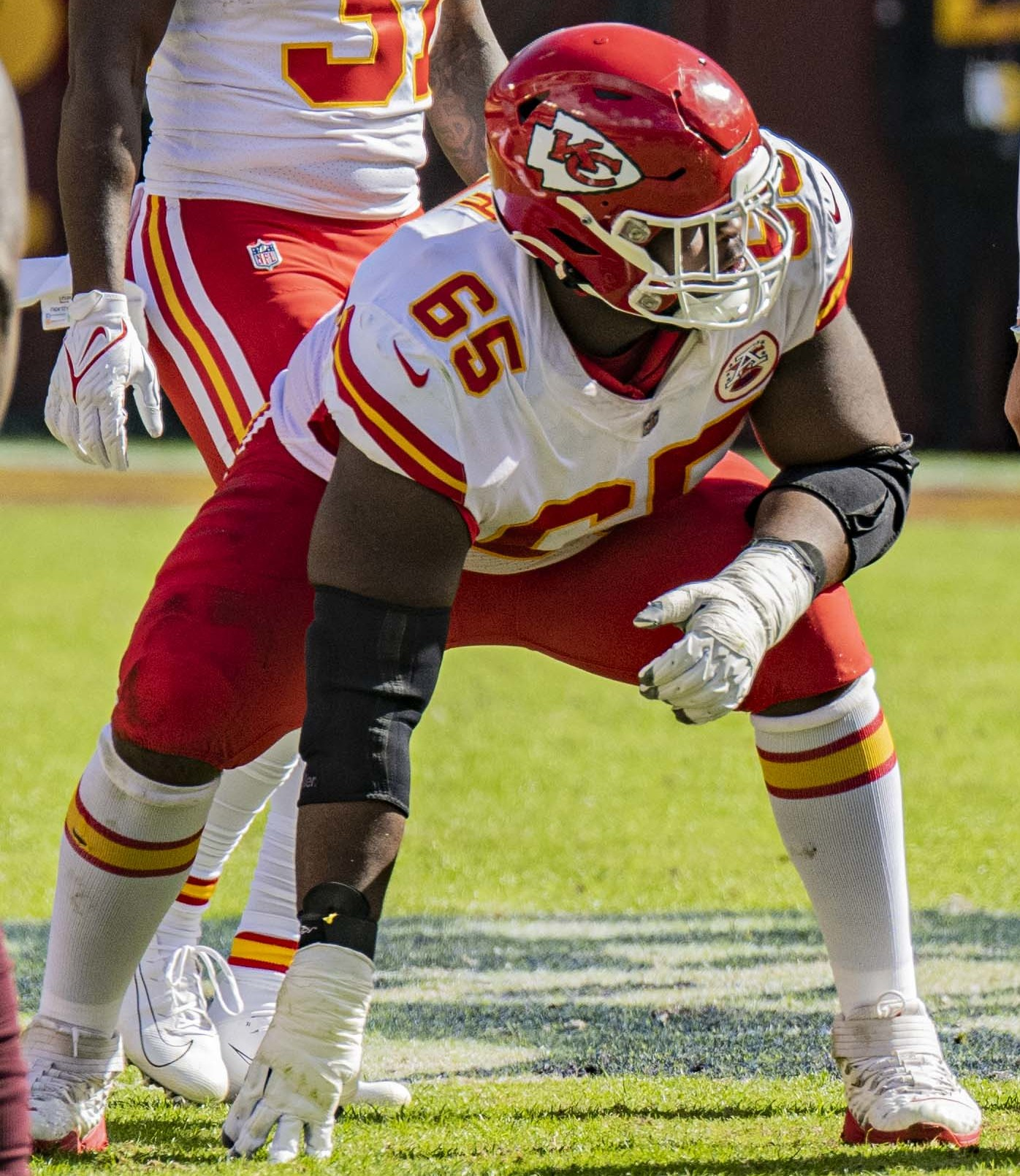
Kansas City Chiefs offensive lineman Trey Smith in a three-point stance.

The three-point stance is a stance used by linemen and running backs in gridiron football when ready for the start of a play. This stance requires one hand to touch the ground with the other arm cocked back to the thigh/hip region. The back should be slightly inclined forward, as well as the arm which is placed on the ground.

It is associated with a higher risk of head injuries.

== Technique ==
Offensive linemen should put almost no pressure on the grounded hand because an opponent could easily knock him down by attacking it. A defensive lineman however wants an explosive start when the ball is snapped and may lean heavily on the grounded arm to facilitate this. The head should be raised toward the opponent when in this position. This prevents the player from sustaining serious injury and helps him to guide his initial action when the play begins (for example, an offensive lineman might choose whom to block first).

The three-point stance can be useful when trying to gain 'leverage' on the opponent. Reggie White expressed his preference in using this kind of stance.

== History ==
Pop Warner first had his players use it. In 1899, the Columbia Lions were defeated by Warner's Carlisle Indians 42–0:

In the Columbia game, the Indians used the crouching start for the first time in football history.... Until that day the standard position for offensive backs, before the ball was snapped, was with feet well apart, body bent forward and hands on the knees. Warner figured that if sprinters could get a faster start with their hands on the ground, partially supporting their bodies, then the same method would increase speed in football. Warner had the Indians practice the crouching start for a long time in practice and then sprung the stance against Columbia. Soon all teams were using the crouch for both backs and linemen.

== Head injuries ==
"Down" stances (one or both hands on the field) have a higher risk of potentially dangerous head accelerations of 20 g-forces than upright stances. Some players, especially offensive linemen, may experience 100 or more such accelerations during a single game. Avoiding the three-point stance can reduce the number of head accelerations significantly.

In 2010, NFL Commissioner Roger Goodell raised the possibility of banning the stance from the game due to injury concerns.

The US Pop Warner youth football program banned the use of three-point stance for younger players, beginning with players age 10 and under in 2019, in part due to concerns about children lowering their heads, resulting in more head injuries.

The Spring League banned the stance for offensive linemen in 2020, when new information about its effect on head acceleration was released. The new XFL had proposed banning the stance for their inaugural 2020 season. As of 2021, the National Federation of State High School Associations (NFHS) had discussed but not proposed banning the three-point stance for their teenaged players.

== See also ==
- Four-point stance – both hands and feet on the ground, with weight evenly distributed
