= Lineman (gridiron football) =

Player who specializes in play at the line of scrimmage

A diagram of the linemen, with defensive linemen (in 4-3 formation) in red and offensive linemen in green.

In gridiron football, a lineman is a player who specializes in play at the line of scrimmage. The linemen of the team currently in possession of the ball are the offensive line (OL), while linemen on the opposing team are the defensive line (DL). A number of National Football League (NFL) rules specifically address restrictions and requirements for the offensive line, whose job is to help protect the quarterback from getting sacked for a loss or fumbling. The defensive line is covered by the same rules that apply to all defensive players. Linemen are usually the largest players on the field in both height and weight, since their positions usually require less running and more strength than skill positions.

== Offensive line ==
The offensive line (OL) consists of the center, who is responsible for snapping the ball into play, two guards who flank the center, and two offensive tackles flanking these guards. In addition, a full offensive line may also include a tight end outside one or both of the tackles.

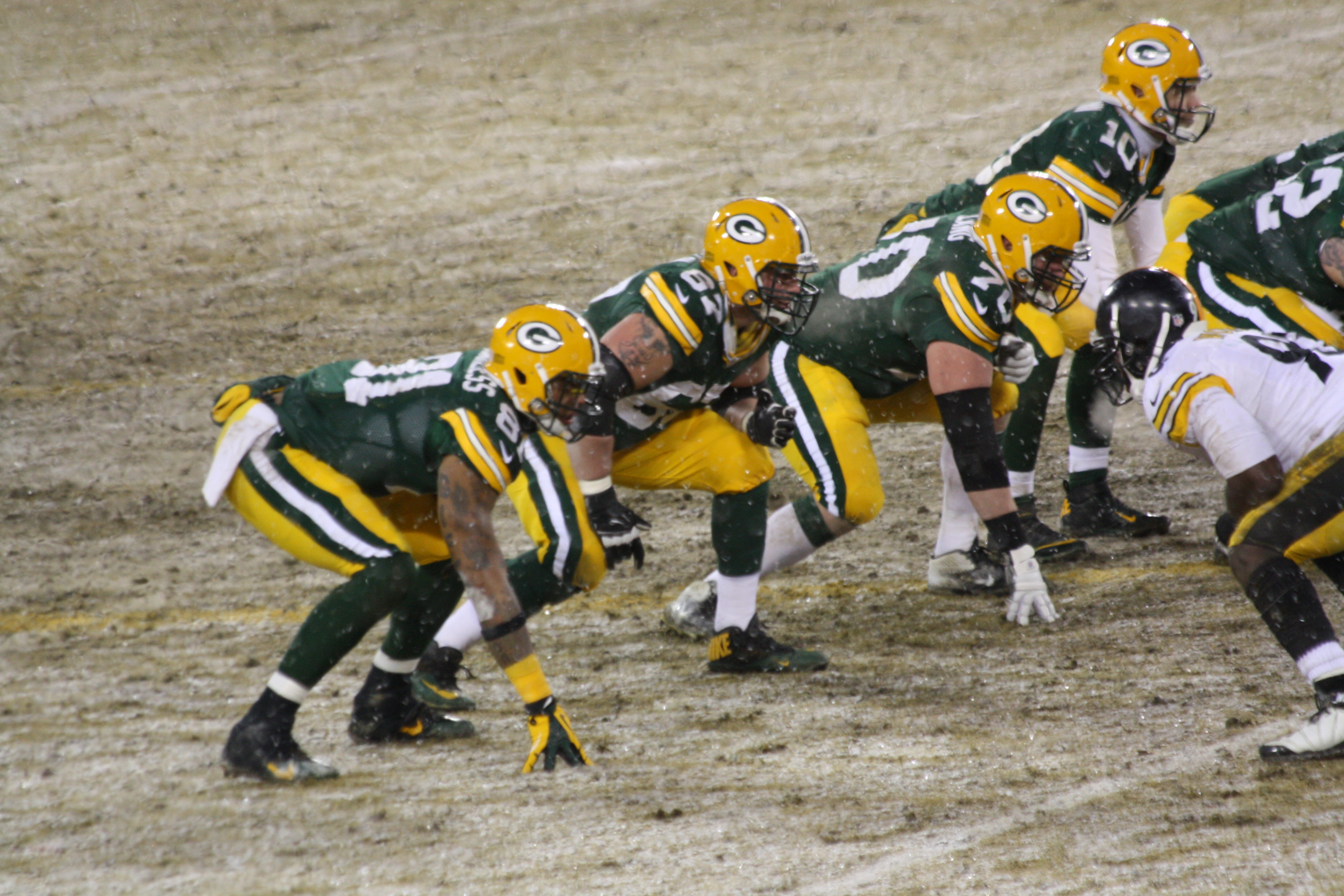
The Green Bay Packers offensive line

An offensive lineman's motion during a play is often limited to just a few quick steps (typically from a three-point stance) to establish position, followed by a wrestling match similar to sumo. Offensive linemen thus tend to be the largest and strongest players on the field with excellent agility and balance, but limited straight-line running speed and stamina.

On some running plays, an offensive lineman will pull by backing out of his initial position and running behind the other offensive linemen to engage a defensive player beyond the initial width of the offensive line; in modern games this duty usually falls to guards.

When an offensive lineman knocks a player down on a block, leaving the defensive player lying flat on his back, it is known as a pancake block.

When an offensive line has an equal number of men on either side of the center, it is known as a balanced line. The interior offensive line consists of the center and guards.

Offensive linemen are not eligible to receive forward passes and are not allowed to advance more than two yards past the line of scrimmage at the time a pass is thrown, whether they are engaged with a defensive player or not.

=== Run ===
On running plays, the primary job of the offensive line is to create space for the ball carrier to run, either by pushing all defensive players backwards past the line of scrimmage, or by pushing defensive players to the side to allow the ball carrier to run past them.

=== Pass ===
On passing plays, the offensive line is tasked with stopping defensive players from tackling the quarterback before he has thrown the ball. Stopping these players indefinitely is practically not possible, so the main objective of the offensive line is to slow them down, providing the quarterback with enough time to identify an open, eligible receiver and throw him the ball.

== Defensive line ==
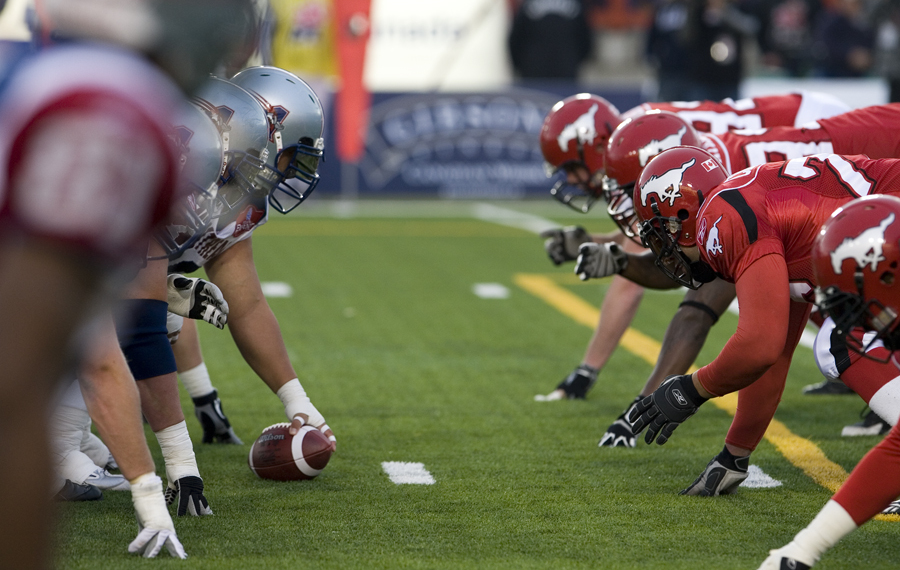
The Montreal Alouettes offensive line (left) and the Calgary Stampeders defensive line (right)

The defensive line (DL) consists of one or two defensive tackles and two defensive ends who play outside the defensive tackles. The defensive line works with the linebackers to try to control the line of scrimmage. The 4-3 defense, most commonly used in the NFL, employs two defensive tackles (and a defensive line of four men, with three linebackers behind them), while the 3-4 defense uses just a single defensive tackle, called the nose tackle (and a defensive line of three men, with four linebackers behind them). Defensive ends in a typical 3-4 have responsibilities more similar to a 4-3 defensive tackle than 4-3 defensive ends.

On running plays, the goal is to tackle the ball carrier. The defensive line attempts to maintain their original formation (even spacing without holes), but also to prevent any members of the opposing offensive line from successfully engaging the linebackers, who chase down the ball carrier. The defensive tackles are usually the most skilled run defenders on the team.

On passing plays, the defensive line tries to reach the quarterback. Ideally, the defensive players are able to tackle the quarterback for a loss (a sack), but in practice the quarterback will usually manage to throw the ball before an actual tackle is made; the goal is thus to put pressure on the quarterback as quickly as possible to force him to throw the ball before he can find an open receiver. Defensive ends are usually the most skilled pass rushers on the team. In order to increase the pressure on the quarterback, teams will often have players other than the defensive line attempt to sack the quarterback; this is called a blitz.

Because the defense does not know whether the offense is attempting a passing play or a running play (or whether a quarterback will give up on an attempt to pass and instead run with the ball), they must balance passing and running strategies: running around offensive linemen and avoiding contact may allow faster pressure on a quarterback, but it also leaves a hole in the defensive line and frees an offensive lineman to engage a linebacker, enabling a big running play.

Defensive linemen, particularly defensive ends are typically lighter and faster than defensive tackles and offensive linemen. Defensive tackles weight averages between 260 and 310 lbs.
