= List of Eyeshield 21 chapters =

The first volume of the Eyeshield 21 manga series, published by Shueisha on December 20, 2002.

The Japanese manga series Eyeshield 21 was written by Riichiro Inagaki and illustrated by Yusuke Murata. The series follows Sena Kobayakawa, a student who coerced by Yoichi Hiruma, the school's American football team captain, reluctantly becomes an American football player under the pseudonym of "Eyeshield 21".

The manga was first published in Shueisha's magazine Weekly Shōnen Jump as a two-part one-shot on March 5 and 12, 2002. The regular serialization started with the publication of the first chapter in Weekly Shōnen Jump on July 23, 2002, where it was serialized weekly until its conclusion on June 15, 2009.

The 333 chapters, referred to as "downs", were collected and published into 37 tankōbon volumes by Shueisha starting on December 20, 2002; the last volume was released on October 2, 2009. The manga was adapted into a 145-episode anime series co-produced by TV Tokyo, Nihon Ad Systems and Gallop that aired in Japan on TV Tokyo from April 6, 2005, to March 19, 2008.

Eyeshield 21 was licensed for an English-language release in North America by Viz Media. It released Eyeshield 21 under the Shonen Jump Advanced label, with the first volume being released on April 5, 2005, and the last one on October 4, 2011. The manga has also been licensed in several countries, among them in France by Glénat, in Hong Kong by Culturecom, in Indonesia by Elex Media Komputindo, in Italy by Panini Comics, in South Korea by Daewon Media, and in Taiwan by Tong Li Publishing.

== Volume list ==
=== Volumes 1–19 ===
No.	Title	Original release date	English release date
1	The Boy With the Golden Legs; Ōgon no Ashi o Motsu Otoko (黄金の脚を持つ男)	December 20, 2002; 978-4-08-873370-8	April 5, 2005; 978-1-59116-752-5
1. "The Boy with the Golden Legs" (黄金の脚を持つ男, "Ōgon no Ashi o Motsu Otoko"); 2. "The Five-Second Wall" (5秒の壁, "5 Byō no Kabe"); 3. "We Need Eleven!" (11人いる!, "11 Nin Iru!"); 4. "Kill 'em!!" (ぶっころす!!, "Bukkorosu!!"); 5. "Hero in a Pinch" (ピンチにはヒーロー!!, "Pinchi ni wa Hīrō!!"); 6. "Grind 'em Into the Field" (フィールドをねじ伏せろ, "Fīrudo o Nejifusero"); 7. "Eleven Scarecrows" (11 scarecrows(11体のかかし), "11 Scarecrows (11 Tai no Kakashi)")
Sena Kobayakawa has just managed to enter high school and on his first day, he is bullied by three students known collectively as the "Hah Brothers". To beat Sena without witnesses, they enter the American football clubhouse, but soon a club member, Ryokan Kurita, appears. Kurita's size and strength make the Hah Brothers run away. Kurita then invites Sena to join the Deimon Devil Bats and he accepts to be the manager. Later Sena is chased again by the bullies and, unknown to himself, is seen by Yoichi Hiruma, the club captain. Impressed, Hiruma makes him join the club as a running back named "Eyeshield 21" with an eyeshield protector helmet. After getting members from other sports clubs for the Tokyo Area Spring Tournament, they face off against the Kogaihama Cupids. After Sena makes the mistake of making a Deimon's player, Tetsuo Ishimaru, wear soccer shoes, Sena is forced to replace him and makes a win of 6–3. Just as the game is over, Mamori Anezaki, Sena's childhood friend, comes to see a beaten up Sena and confronts Hiruma to make Sena quit from the club.
2	The False Hero; Inchiki Hīrō (インチキ·ヒーロー)	March 4, 2003; 978-4-08-873398-2	May 31, 2005; 978-1-59116-809-6
8. "Something to Hold on to" (その手に掴むもの, "Sono Te ni Tsukamu Mono"); 9. "The World of Power" (パワーの世界, "Pawā no Sekai"); 10. "False Hero" (インチキ·ヒーロー, "Inchiki Hīrō"); 11. "Half-Second Bodyguard" (0.5秒のボディガード, "0.5 Byō no Bodigādo"); 12. "Lucky Punch" (ラッキーパンチ, "Rakkī Panchi"); 13. "Prince of the Kingdom" (王国のプリンス, "Ōkoku no Purinsu"); 14. "Devil Magician" (DEVIL MAGICIAN(悪魔の魔法使い), "Devil Magician (Akuma no Mahōtsukai)"); 15. "Knight of the Kingdom" (王国の騎士, "Ōkoku no Kishi"); 16. "Two Scraps of Paper" (紙クズ2枚, "Kami Kuzu 2 Mai")
After Sena refuses to quit, Hiruma tricks Mamori to make her join the club as a secretary to protect Sena. A shocking surprise is that they have to face the Ojo White Knights in their next match. All the temporary players want more information about Eyeshield 21 from Hiruma, who tells a lie that he is from Notre Dame, a well-known college in the United States. During the big day, Sena nearly leaves the team after hearing that two players were injured by Ojo's Seijuro Shin and that he is the primary target. But after all the players express their hope to beat them, he joins in. Ojo are caught off guard when Sena makes a touchdown at the beginning of the match. They hope for the second touchdown but as Shin enters, everything changes. In the last few minutes of the second half, Hiruma takes off his uniform and tells everyone that they cannot win. But in the end, Sena decides to play regardless of Hiruma's words.
3	And They're Called the Devil Bats; Sono na wa Deimon Debiru Battsu (その名は泥門デビルバッツ)	June 4, 2003; 978-4-08-873439-2	August 2, 2005; 978-1-59116-874-4
17. "The Battle to Win" (勝つための闘い, "Katsu Tame no Tatakai"); 18. "The World of Light Speed" (光速の世界, "Kōsoku no Sekai"); 19. "The Beginning of Defeat" (挫折と始まり, "Zasetsu to Hajimari"); 20. "Epilogue of the Prologue (Epilogue of Prologue(序章最終話)", "Epilogue of Prologue (Joshō Saishū Banashi)"); 21. "And They're Called the Devil Bats" (その名は泥門デビルバッツ, "Sono na wa Deimon Debiru Battsu"); 22. "The Shape of a Hero" (ヒーローの形, "Hīrō no Katachi"); 23. "A Dream Shattered and Then Another Dream" (夢やぶれて夢, "Yume Yabure Te Yume"); 24. "Catch Master 80" (背番号80 キャッチの達人, "Sebangō 80 Kyacchi no Tatsujin"); 25. "Declaration of War" (宣戦布告, "Sensen Fukoku")
Sena manages to make a second touchdown but in the end, his team loses by 68–12. The next day, he learns that they have to practice even harder for the Tokyo Autumn Tournament. Then Sena finds a great catcher named Taro "Monta" Raimon. Monta declines to join the team but, during practice, as Hiruma is looking for a receiver, Monta manages to catch his fastball with one hand. After that, Hiruma persuades Monta to join the club, which he does after Hiruma says they need someone to protect Mamori from the egoistic and harmful Eyeshield 21. The next day, the news is that the Ojo White Knights nearly lost to the Sankaku Punks by one point. Hiruma is very upset as their propaganda of having scored two touchdowns against Ojo would not work anymore. So he decides to have an exhibition match with the Zokugaku Chameleons at the Deimon High School field. Dressing up as Eyeshield 21, he meets their captain, Habashira Rui, and wagers 5 million yen.
4	Intimidation; Bibirashita Otoko (ビビらした男)	August 4, 2003; 978-4-08-873498-9	October 10, 2005; 978-1-4215-0074-4
26. "Death of the Riceman" (ライス君殺人事件, "Raisu Kun Satsujin Jiken"); 27. "A Reason for Battle" (闘いの理由, "Tatakai no Riyū"); 28. "Monkey Hero" (ヒーローモンキー, "Hīrō Monkī"); 29. "BAD vs BAD" (BAD vs BAD(悪対悪), "BAD vs BAD (Aku Tai Aku)"); 30. "Intimidation" (ビビらした男, "Bibirashita Otoko"); 31. "Cream Puff Party" (シュークリームパーティー, "Shūkurīmu Pātī"); 32. "Tower of Hell" (HELL TOWER(地獄の塔), "Hell Tower (Jigoku no Tō)"); 33. "Tower of Heaven" (HEAVEN TOWER(天国の塔), "Heaven Tower (Tengoku no Tō)"); 34. "We Are Family" (ファミリー·ファミリー, "Famirī Famirī")
Before the match, the Hah Brothers search inside their clubhouse for the negatives of the naked pictures Hiruma took to blackmail them. When Kurita goes to get more sets of equipment and finds them, they accept to play for Deimon to not look suspicious. The Devil Bats easily dominate because Habashira is trying to focus on Eyeshield's runs, but they did not expect Monta or even Ishimaru to be playing. In the end, the Devil Bats win by 46–28. Because they cannot pay the money they wagered, the Zokugaku Chameleons became Hiruma's slaves. Next day, the Devil Bats conduce interviews for new members, and Hiruma gives them a test—a marathon run to the top of Tokyo Tower with bags of ice and many obstacles. In the end, Sena, Monta, Manabu Yukimitsu, Daikichi Komusubi, and the Hah Brothers pass the exam. After many days of practice, they go to watch the finals between the Ojo White Knights and the Seibu Wild Gunmen. To their shock, Seibu are in the lead.
5	Powerful	October 3, 2003; 978-4-08-873519-1	December 6, 2005; 978-1-4215-0113-0
35. "The Knights vs. The Gunmen" (騎士vsガンマン, "Kishi VS Ganman"); 36. "A Hero Has a Solid Foundation" (ヒーローは基礎固め, "Hīrō wa Kiso Katame"); 37. "Qualifications to Be a Hero" (ヒーローの資格, "Hīrō no Shikaku"); 38. "A Genuine Hero" (ホンモノ·ヒーロー, "Honmono Hīrō"); 39. "Spy 0021"; 40. "Fightin' Linemen" (闘えラインマン, "Tatakae Rain Man"); 41. "Powerful"; 42. "The People Laugh at the Underdog" (小市民は挑戦者を笑う, "Shōshimin wa Chōsensha o Warau"); 43. "Power vs. Technique vs. Power vs. Technique" (パワーvsテクニックvsパワーvsテクニック, "Pawā VS Tekunikku VS Pawā VS Tekunikku")
Ojo win the Kanto Spring Tournament when Jo Tetsuma, Seibu's ace receiver, goes to the bathroom after drinking too much water. Later, news comes that an American team is challenging a Japanese team to fight them. Hiruma sends an e-mail to the magazine that announced it but they are rejected by the editor. So Hiruma uses his hacking technique to send a fake e-mail via the publisher's computer to the Americans. But the Taiyo Sphinx, who were supposed to fight with the American team, are not satisfied. So Hiruma challenges them to a match over the title of Japanese representative. The Hah Brothers quit the team as they cannot find the negatives, but after they are badly beaten by Taiyo's Banba Marmoru, they return to the team to become stronger. The match starts off badly as the team cannot break down Taiyo's pyramid line. But thanks to the new technique that the Hah Brothers learn with Zokugaku's players, one of them, Kazuki Jumonji, pins down Taiyo's lineman Niinobu Kasamatsu.
6	Devil Bats Take Flight; Tobe Debiru Batto (跳べデビルバット)	December 19, 2003; 978-4-08-873553-5	February 7, 2006; 978-1-4215-0274-8
44. "Major Rebellion" (大暴動, "Dai Bōdō"); 45. "Persistent Fellows" (しつこい野郎共, "Shitsukoi Yarō Tomo"); 46. "A Sad Offensive Style" (哀しき攻撃型, "Kanashiki Ofenshibu Sutairu"); 47. "The Catching Gods" (キャッチの神様, "Kyacchi no Kamisama"); 48. "Devil Bats Take Flight!" (跳べデビルバット, "Tobe Debiru Batto"); 49. "The Kings Will Battle the Gods" (王は神へと挑む, "Ō wa Kami e to Idomu"); 50. "The Warriors of Buddha's Gate" (仏門の戦士達, "Butsumon no Senshi-tachi"); 51. "The Gods' Invisible Hands" (神の見えざる手, "Kami no Miezaru Te"); 52. "Ability Speaks for Itself" (実力だけがモノを言う, "Jitsuryoku Dake ga Mono o Iu")
As Jumonji tackles the Taiyo's quarterback, Kiminari Harao, Eyeshield 21 recovers the fumble to change the possession of the ball and the tide of the game. By half-time, Deimon catches up with Taiyo leading by only one point (13–12). However, Taiyo introduces a new cornerback named Ken Kamaguruma, whose bump technique throws off Hiruma's passing timing and Monta's ability to catch. When only a minute is left on the timer, Hiruma throws a long pass, and despite being constantly attacked by Kamagura, Monta catches the ball and makes a touchdown, putting Deimon two points behind with seconds left (20–18). The game ends in a tie after Eyeshield jumps Taiyo's defensive line with the Devil Bat Dive to score a two-point conversion. The idea of an overtime is thrown aside as Taiyo gives Deimon the right to represent Japan in the game against the Americans. After the match, everybody goes see the Spring Tournament's final game in which the Ojo White Knights lose miserably to the champion of every other tournament edition, the Shinryugi Naga (40–3).
7	Musashi; Sono Otoko Musashi (その男ムサシ)	March 4, 2004; 978-4-08-873578-8	April 4, 2006; 978-1-4215-0405-6
53. "Aim for the Hollywood Star!" (目指せハリウッドスター!, "Mezase Hariuddo Sutā!"); 54. "Trinity" (三位一体, "Sanmiittai"); 55. "The 60-Yard Legend" (60ヤードの伝説, "60 Yādo no Densetsu"); 56. "Musashi" (その男ムサシ, "Sono Otoko Musashi"); 57. "Long-Ago Days of Fireworks" (全て遠い日の花火だと, "Subete Tōi Hi no Hanabi Dato"); 58. "Black Panther" (黒い豹, "Kuroi Hyō"); 59. "Space Shuttle" (スペースシャトル, "Supēsu Shatoru"); 60. "The Bonds of Battle" (戦いの絆, "Tatakai no Kizuna"); 61. "The Decisive Japan-USA Game" (日米決戦, "Nichibei Kessen")
Sena and Monta meet Musashi, a friend of Hiruma and Kurita who quit football but was once dubbed "the legendary 60-yard kicker". Monta demands him that once they have gotten really stronger as a team he return to reprise his role. At the same time, the coach of the Nasa Aliens, Leonard Apollo, cancels the game against the Devil Bats, regarding them as not worth the effort. However, when Apollo is humiliated worldwide by a Hiruma's video, Apollo sets up the game, stating that if his team does not win by more than 10 points, then they would not return to America. Hiruma counters this wager by saying that the Devil Bats would leave Japan if they did not win by 10 points. Meanwhile in America, Nasa Aliens' star player, Patrick "Panther" Spencer, is reduced to being a ball boy because of Apollo's racism. Later the two teams meet up at Kurita's home and have a party before the match.
8	True Warriors Seek Out Strong Foes; Senshi Naze Kyōsha o Nozomu (戦士何故強者を望む)	April 30, 2004; 978-4-08-873598-6	June 6, 2006; 978-1-4215-0637-1
62. "American Muscle" (マッスル THE アメリカ, "Massuru the Amerika"); 63. "Shooting Star 21" (シューティングスター21, "Shūtingu Sutā 21"); 64. "True Warriors Seek Out Strong Foes" (戦士何故強者を望む, "Senshi Naze Kyōsha o Nozomu"); 65. "Hiruma vs. Apollo" (ヒル魔VSアポロ, "Hiruma VS Aporo"); 66. "Big Sweep Strategy" (大掃除作戦, "Dai Sōji Sakusen"); 67. "If There's Something You Want..." (もしほしいものがあるのなら, "Moshi Hoshī Mono ga Aru no Nara"); 68. "The Iron Grid Has Been Opened" (鉄格子は開かれた, "Tetsugōshi wa Hirakareta"); 69. "Natural Born Sprinter" (natural born sprinter(生まれついての走者), "natural born sprinter (Umaretsuite no Sōsha)"); 70. "The Reality of the Wild" (野生の現実, "Yasei no Riaru")
As Aliens' main tactic is a long pass known as "Shuttle Pass", the Devil Bats try to blitz their quarterback, Homer Fitzgerald. When Komusubi cannot stop Homer because of his strength, the Americans do two touchdowns in a row. Sena then volunteers and overcomes Homer with his speed and scores a touchdown. Although their blitzes are working to stop Aliens' offensives, the Devil Bats cannot overcome their strong defensive line. So Hiruma instructs them to do a sweep, and Sena scores a touchdown, as Panther begs to enter. When the Devil Bats open 26–21, all players do a dogeza to Apollo and Panther is allowed to play. He enters and Sena is unable to stop him from scoring a touchdown, and he also blocks Sena's runs. When there is one minute left, the Aliens are winning by 33–26. When it seems Panther will score the decisive touchdown, Sena is finally able to stop Panther and scores a touchdown.
9	Hell Is for Devil Bats; Jigoku ni Horeta Otoko-tachi (地獄に惚れた男達)	August 4, 2004; 978-4-08-873641-9	August 1, 2006; 978-1-4215-0638-8
71. "No Way! USA?" (USO! USA?); 72. "Heaven or Hell? Training Camp, American Edition!!" (天国or地獄?アメリカ合宿編!!, "Tengoku or Jigoku? Amerika Gasshuku Hen!!"); 73. "The All-Star Devil Gunmen" (オールスターデビルガンマンズ, "Ōrusutā Debiru Ganmanzu"); 74. "The Strongest Pentagon" (最強の五角形, "Saikyō no Pentagon"); 75. "Trainer Doburoku" (トレーナーどぶるく, "Torēnā Doburuku"); 76. "The Borderline to Hell" (地獄への境界線, "Jigoku e no Kyōkai-sen"); 77. "Hell Is for Devil Bats" (地獄に惚れた男達, "Jigoku ni Horeta Otoko-tachi"); 78. "Faraway Las Vegas" (遥かなるラスベガス, "Harukanaru Rasu Begasu"); 79. "The Advancing Devil Bat Army!" (進めデビルバッツ軍!, "Susume Debiru Battsu Gun!")
After the Devil Bats lose by one point, Hiruma shreds the Americans' passports and use their return tickets to fly to America. There, the Devil Bats meet the Seibu Wild Gunmen, and they enter into a beach football contest. When they win, the coach of the runner-up team is revealed to be Doburoku Sakaki, the man who taught Hiruma, Kurita and Musashi how to play football. Doburoku takes Deimon and Seibu to a ranch where they are trained for the next day by Doburoku. Before the Devil Bats leave for Japan, they are given a choice to be involved in a Death March, a radical training procedure wherein forty days they travel on foot 2000 km from Texas to Las Vegas, to which everyone accepts. The linemen are forced to push the pick-up truck there, Sena is made to kick a stone while running all the way there, and Monta and Yukimitsu are running there while doing football pass routes and being shot at by Hiruma if they lag behind. Meanwhile in Japan, their first opponent in the Autumn Tournament is decided; it is the Amino Cyborgs, a school specialized in sports medicine enhancement.
10	Is There a Loser in the House? Makeinu wa Iru Ka (負け犬はいるか)	October 4, 2004; 978-4-08-873663-1	October 3, 2006; 978-1-4215-0639-5
80. "The Highest Point in Japan" (日本で一番高い場所, "Nippon de Ichiban Takai Basho"); 81. "Shin vs. Panther" (進VSパンサー, "Shin VS Pansā"); 82. "7,500 Miles in Search of a Friend" (仲間を探して三千里, "Nakama o Sagashite Sanzenri"); 83. "Things That Must Be Protected, Things That Can Be Protected" (守る者守らざる者, "Mamoru Mono Mamora Zaru Mono"); 84. "Signs of a Ghost" (ゴーストの胎動, "Gōsuto no Taidō"); 85. "Diamonds in the Rough" (ダイヤの原石たち, "Daiya no Genseki-tachi"); 86. "Is There a Loser in the House?" (負け犬はいるか, "Makeinu wa Iru Ka"); 87. "Las Vegas, City of Lights" (光の街ラスベガス, "Hikari no Machi Rasu Begasu"); 88. "Black Jack Is 21" (BLACK JACKは21, "Black Jack wa 21")
As the Devil Bats train in the United States, Shin is doing a special training in the thin air of Mount Fuji to improve his cardiopulmonary functions. Panther appears and challenges Shin; when he tries to pass through Shin, he is stopped with just one arm. Meanwhile, Sena kicks the rock out of the road and he is separated from the rest. He ends up in the San Antonio Armadillos Stadium, where he meets Suzuna and Natsuhiko Taki. The girl is following his brother who wants to be a professional football player. Taki and Sena then participate in an enrollment match to join the Armadillos, during which Sena performs the running technique to cut the opponent without losing speed–the "Devil Bat Ghost". Although Taki is not approved, he and Suzuna join the Devil Bats in the Death March. When they arrive in Las Vegas, the Devil Bats win 20 million yen in a casino. They then can pay for Doburoku's debts that were keeping him in the United States and he can join them as their manager in their return to Japan.
11	Open Season; Taisen Kaimaku (大戦開幕)	December 3, 2004; 978-4-08-873683-9	December 5, 2006; 978-1-4215-0640-1
89. "Sunday's the Big Game!" (決戦は日曜日, "Kessen wa Nichiyōbi"); 90. "The Player Who Was Too Slow" (遅すぎたアスリート, "Oso Sugita Asurīto"); 91. "Reach for the Stars" (一流の夢, "Ichiryū no Yume"); 92. "The Best Pass in Japan" (日本一のパス, "Nipponichi no Pasu"); 93. "A Binding Oath" (誓いの絆, "Chikai no Kizuna"); 94. "Open Season" (大戦開幕, "Taisen Kaimaku"); 95. "Deimon's Worst Day" (泥門、大凶の日, "Deimon, Daikyō no Hi"); 96. "Hip Thruster" (ケツの爆発, "Ketsu no Bakuhatsu"); 97. "The Thousandth Player" (千両役者, "Senryōyakusha")
As they return, Suzuna becomes the captain of the cheerleader team, and the team's roster for the Autumn Tournament is announced. Taki is selected, and Yukimitsu is not chosen as a first-team player because he is too slow, but Sena and Monta promise they will not lose until they have a complete team. Meanwhile, Ojo's receiver Haruto Sakuraba is frustrated because he is not as good as Shin. However, when he realizes he is important as a partner to the quarterback Ichiro Takami, he resigns his career as model to focus on football. On the day of the match against Amino, Taki and Sena take the wrong bus and the game starts without them. The results of the Death March are visible as the Hah Brothers, Komusubi and Kurita defeat Amino's linemen, and Monta is able to overcome their receiver. However, no one is able to pass through their captain, Atsushi Munakata, and the games is 8–8 when Sena arrives with the help of Zokugaku's Habashira.
12	Devil Bat Ghost; Debiru Batto Gōsuto (デビルバットゴースト)	March 5, 2005; 978-4-08-873778-2	February 6, 2007; 978-1-4215-1061-3
98. "Devil Bat Ghost" (デビルバットゴースト, "Debiru Batto Gōsuto"); 99. "Victory Is But a Prelude to a Storm" (勝利は嵐の序曲, "Shōri wa Arashi no Jokyoku"); 100. "The Comic Strip Halftime Show" (ハーフタイム4コマショー, "Hāfutaimu 4 Koma Shō"); 101. "99 Percent Stupid!" (バカ99%!, "Baka 99%!"); 102. "Battle Royale"; 103. "The Kingdom Restored" (王国の復興, "Ōkoku no Fukkō"); 104. "Maxi-Devil Power" (MAX DEVILPOWER); 105. "The Power of 1 Percent" (1%の力, "1% no Chikara"); 106. "The Clash of the Colossus and the Ant" (巨象とアリの戦い, "Kyozō to Ari no Tatakai")
In their first attack with Sena, the Devil Bats do a sweep, and Sena overcomes Munakata with the Devil Bat Ghost to score a touchdown. While Taki's ride is stopped and he takes the wrong subway line, Deimon easily win by 38–8. After the Devil Bats help Taki to pass the mid-year entrance exam, they go to see the match between Ojo and the Sankaku Punks. With the duo Sakuraba–Takami scoring through high passes and Shin stopping his opponents, they win by 82–0. After this, the Devil Bats face the Yuuhi Guts, but the actual football members of the Yuuhi team are replaced by other sports team athletes because the school administration was dissatisfied with their previous year results. However, when the Devil Bats are winning by 42–0 the actual members are allowed to play. They are able to score a touchdown, but the game ends 56–6. In the next matches, the Seibu Wild Gunmen win over the Kogaihama Cupids by 125–10, and the Kyoshin Poseidon come back from 14–0 to win against the Hashiratani Deers by 31–14.
13	Who Is the Real Eyeshield 21? Honmono wa Dare da (本物は誰だ)	May 2, 2005; 978-4-08-873805-5	April 3, 2007; 978-1-4215-1062-0
107. "Who Is the Real Eyeshield 21?" (本物は誰だ, "Honmono wa Dare da"); 108. "The Real Body" (本物のボディ, "Honmono no Bodi"); 109. "Sting"; 110. "Ruled by Fear" (恐怖政治, "Kyōfu Seiji"); 111. "The Quarterfinals" (8強の世界, "8 Kyō no Sekai"); 112. "The Phantom Footballer" (幻のアメリカンフットボーラー, "Maboroshi no Amerikan Futtobōrā"); 113. "Fists of Iron" (鉄拳, "Tekken"); 114. "Komusubi's Last-Ditch Move" (うっちゃれ小結関, "Ucchare Komusubi-seki"); 115. "Like a Spinner Firework" (ねずみ花火のように, "Nezumi Hanabi no Yōni")
Kyoshin's Shun Kakei meets Sena under the Eyeshield 21 persona, and says he is not the real Eyeshield, whom Kakei has met in the United States. Sena feels uncomfortable with this, but during a barbecue carvery Shin encourages him. The next day the Devil Bats win their match against the Dokubari Scorpions by 42–0. In the eighth-finals, the Zokugaku Chameleons give up in the middle of their match against Kyoshin, and so Kyoshin is Deimon's next opponent. After this, Sena, Monta and Komusubi go to the Kyoshin's school, where Kengo Mizumachi tells Sena about Kakei's meeting with Eyeshield. He says Eyeshield disappeared from the US and that Kakei returned to search for him in Japan. Mizumachi also says Komusubi is no match for him because of the height difference, and this makes Komusubi run away from home. After the Devil Bats find him, Komusubi is convinced to return. He then regains his confidence when he defeats a taller opponent and is the winner of a sumo tournament.
14	The Demons vs. the Gods of the Sea; Akuma VS Umi no Kami (悪魔VS海の神)	July 4, 2005; 978-4-08-873829-1	June 5, 2007; 978-1-4215-1063-7
116. "The Demons vs. the Gods of the Sea" (悪魔VS海の神, "Akuma VS Umi no Kami"); 117. "Evolving Genius" (進化の天才, "Shinka no Tensai"); 118. "Blood & Pride" (その誇り高き血を, "Sono Hokori Takaki Chi o"); 119. "Pipsqueak vs. Goliath" (チビVSデカ, "Chibi VS Deka"); 120. "The High Wave" (HIGH WAVE); 121. "The Hidden Ace" (裏エースの男, "Ura Ēsu no Otoko"); 122. "He Who Rings the Final Curtain" (終幕を下ろす者, "Shūmaku o Orosu Mono"); 123. "One Year Later" (そして一年後, "Soshite Ichi Nen Go"); 124. "We Are The Poseidons" (我の名はポセイドン, "Ware no Na wa Poseidon")
When the match between Deimon and Kyoshin starts, Komusubi beats Mizumachi, surprising him with a start dash. However, in all other attempts Mizumachi overcomes him by using his longer arms. When Komusubi's parents arrive, his father advises him to use his arm strength and he does so to beat Mizumachi. However, Sena cannot pass through Kakei alone and Kyoshin leads by 7–0. So they use the wishbone formation with Hiruma, Monta, Ishimaru and Sena; the four run together, and when a defender tackles one of them they pass the ball to another person. Doing this, they score a touchdown and the game is now 7–6 by the end of the first half. In the return, Kakei realizes how to control the direction of Deimon's run by having an apparent hole in the defense, and Kyoshin neutralize Deimon's attacks. However, as they focus on Deimon's runs and think Monta is the only receiver, Hiruma sees an open space to do a long pass to Taki, who gets it close to the touchdown line. In the next play, Monta runs to make a comeback to 12–10. But Kyoshin scores and when there is only 18 seconds left they are winning by 17–12.
15	The Toughest Warriors in Tokyo; Tōkyō Saikyō no Senshi-tachi (東京最強の戦士たち)	September 2, 2005; 978-4-08-873850-5	August 7, 2007; 978-1-4215-1064-4
125. "The Split-Second Showdown" (0コンマの決戦, "0 Konma no Kessen"); 126. "The Last Firework" (最後の花火, "Saigo no Hanabi"); 127. "The Rookie Ace" (ルーキーエース, "Rūkī Ēsu"); 128. "Master of Quickness" (MASTER OF QUICKNESS(素早さの師), "MASTER OF QUICKNESS (Subayasa no Shi)"); 129. "The Sports Day Showdown!!" (決戦!!泥門体育祭!, "Kessen!! Deimon Taīkusai!"); 130. "The Handcuffed Cavalry Super Showdown!!" (大決戦!!手錠騎馬戦!, "Dai Kessen!! Tejō Gibasen!"); 131. "The Toughest Warriors in Tokyo" (東京最強の戦士たち, "Tōkyō Saikyō no Senshi-tachi"); 132. "Devil Bat Genesis" (デビルバッツ創世記, "Debiru Battsu Sōseiki"); 133. "Hope for a Miracle" (奇跡への希望, "Kiseki e no Kibō")
The Devil Bats decide to give Sena their last chance: Sena overcomes Kakei by using a spinning cut, but Mizumachi appears and stops Sena when he is 30cm from the touchdown line. With two seconds remaining, they decide to use the Devil Bat Dive and when Komusubi tackles Mizumachi down Sena is able to score a touchdown to guarantee an 18–17 victory. In the following matches, both Ojo and Seibu qualify to the semi-finals; Ojo will face the Bando Spiders and Seibu will take Deimon. Later, Sena discovers the person who taught him how to run, Riku Kaitani, is playing for Seibu. The next day Deimon has a field day and the Devil Bats train the bump technique during a cavalry battle game in which the players are handcuffed. Knowing Seibu have a stronger team than they have, the Devil Bats realize again the importance of a kicker. Monta suspects that Musashi will return because he is officially listed to play, but Kurita reveals he and Hiruma always listed him hoping he would return any time. Confronted, Musashi expresses his desire to return and reveals his father is hospitalized, which led Musashi to replace him in the family carpentry.
16	Dawn of the Time-Out; Taimu Auto no Yoake (タイムアウトの夜明け)	November 4, 2005; 978-4-08-873874-1	October 2, 2007; 978-1-4215-1065-1
134. "Roller-Coaster Game" (ジェットコースターゲーム, "Jetto Kōsutā Gēmu"); 135. "The Lightning-Fast Gunman" (神速のガンマン, "Shinsoku no Ganman"); 136. "The Western Iron Horse" (WESTERN IRON HORSE); 137. "The Best Countermeasure Is a Super Offense" (対抗策は超攻撃, "Taikō Saku wa Chō Kōgeki"); 138. "3 Showdowns, 3 Losses" (3決戦3タテ, "3 Kessen 3 Tate"); 139. "Rapid-Fire Brains" (RAPID FIRE BRAIN(頭脳の早撃ち), "RAPID FIRE BRAIN (Zunō no Haya Uchi)"); 140. "The Eye that Waits" (待つことに賭けた眼を, "Matsukoto ni Kaketa Me o"); 141. "Dawn of the Time-Out" (タイムアウトの夜明け, "Taimu Auto no Yoake"); 142. "The True Deimon Devil Bats!!" (真·泥門デビルバッツ!!, "Shin Deimon Debiru Battsu!!")
The game between Deimon and Seibu starts with two kickoff return touchdowns by Riku and Sena respectively (7–6). In the sequence, Riku is stopped by Komusubi and it is up to Seibu's quarterback, Shien "Kid" Mushanokoji, to restart the match. Hiruma tries to blitz Kid but he is not able to stop the faster pass in Tokyo. With the bump technique, the Devil Bats are able to stop most receivers, except for Tetsuma who scores a touchdown (14–6). Then they try repeatedly to blitz Kid to the point that it seems Hiruma lost control. However, his plan was to force Kid to throw the ball even faster to do a zone blitz. But Kid surprises him and does not pass this time and scores a touchdown by himself (20–6). When it is 26–6, Bando's kicker Kotaro Sasaki uses the broadcast booth to blame Musashi for Deimon's lose. Meanwhile in the hospital, Musashi's father and his co-workers motivate him to return to play football. He arrives just in time to score a field goal in the last play of the first half (29–9). When the second half starts, Sena advances just a few yards each down going through the center with Kurita's help.
17	The Drive to Be the Best; Saikyō e no Kawaki (最強への渇き)	January 5, 2006; 978-4-08-874006-5	December 4, 2007; 978-1-4215-1166-5
143. "Devil Laser Bullet"; 144. "The Devil Bats' Big Gun" (デビルバッツの大砲, "Debirubattsu no Taihō"); 145. "The Pursuer and the Pursued" (追う者、追われる者, "Ō Mono, Owareru Mono"); 146. "The Drive to Be the Best" (最強への渇き, "Saikyō e no Kawaki"); 147. "Final Trap, Final Hunt" (FINAL TRAP&FINAL HUNT(最後の罠と最後の狩), "FINAL TRAP & FINAL HUNT (Saigo no Wana to Saigo no Kari)"); 148. "Light-Speed Crash" (光速のクラッシュ, "Kōsoku no Kurasshu"); 149. "A Primitive Battle" (原始の戦い, "Genshi no Tatakai"); 150. "Premature Down" (早すぎたダウン, "Hayasugita Daun"); 151. "The Man in the Mask" (仮面の男, "Kamen no Otoko")
Sena slowly moves when he suddenly does a Devil Bat Dive without the ball as decoy so Hiruma can throw a long pass to Monta score a touchdown (29–16). After this, Musashi's kickoff is only catch by Riku when it is just a few centimeters from Seibu's goal line. Then Seibu's offensive is stopped by Deimon to score two points from a safety (29–18). After Musashi's field goal reduces the difference to eight points (29–21), the game is balanced with Riku and Taki scoring touchdowns for their teams. When there is only two minutes left, it is 44–35 and Kid opts for the most safe play—a pass to Tetsuma—to spend their time. However, Monta is finally able to intercept by aiming on Tetsuma's fingers. The ball is taken by Sena, who can surpass Riku to score a touchdown (44–42). With one minute left and Seibu's chance to attack, Deimon do an onside kick—a short kick in hopes of regaining possession of the ball. Monta and Tetsuma get the ball at the same time, but Tetsuma's body touches the ground first so the possession goes to Seibu and the match ends. At first the Devil Bats think they can no more go to the Kanto Tournament, but Hiruma reveals the third place also qualifies for it.
18	Sena Kobayakawa; Kobayakawa Sena (小早川瀬那)	March 3, 2006; 978-4-08-874028-7	February 5, 2008; 978-1-4215-1544-1
152. "The Red-Eyed Ace" (赤い瞳のエース, "Akai Hitomi no Ēsu"); 153. "Naked Power" (裸の実力, "Hadaka no Chikara"); 154. "Sena Kobayakawa" (小早川瀬那, "Kobayakawa Sena"); 155. "The Football Player" (アメリカンフットボーラー達, "Amerikan Futtobōrā-tachi"); 156. "The Best Kicking Team" (最強のキックチーム, "Saikyō no Kikku Chīmu"); 157. "The Spider's Web" (SPIDER'S WEB); 158. "The Invincible Charge" (無敵の突撃, "Muteki no Totsugeki"); 159. "Hayato Akaba & Kotaro Sasaki" (赤羽隼人&佐々木コータロー, "Akaba Hayato & Sasaki Kōtarō"); 160. "A Challenge to the Real Thing" (本物への挑戦状, "Honmono e no Chōsenjō")
The Ojo White Knights win against Bando Spiders by 10–3, but it is revealed that their best player, Hayato Akaba, could not play. Akaba was the past tournament's MVP and will be able to play in the match against Deimon. In the start of this match, Sena reveals to Mamori and the public he is Eyeshield 21. Bando's strategy is to not let Deimon have the ball possession; Kotaro does an onside kick, Akaba guarantees the ball possession and then Kotaro scores a field goal (3–0). In the second offensive, they change the last part and Akaba scores a touchdown (10–0). However, in the following attack, Hiruma is able to delay Akaba for a few seconds, which allows Sena to get the ball to score a touchdown (10–7). But Sena is stopped in every other attack by Akaba because of Bando's "Run Force", a tactic that positions the blockers to induce the runner to choose a certain path. On the other hand, Akaba's blocks are unstoppable and it allows his team to score another touchdown (17–10). In the last play of the first half, Sena blocks Kotaro's field goal attempt and a strong wind starts.
19	The Successor; Tsugu Mono (継ぐ者)	June 2, 2006; 978-4-08-874107-9	April 1, 2008; 978-1-4215-1624-0
161. "Strong Winds" (太刀風一陣, "Tachikaze Ichijin"); 162. "Faster Than the Wind" (その風よりも疾く, "Sono Kaze Yori Mo Toku"); 163. "'Eyeshield 21'" (「アイシールド21」, "'Aishīrudo 21'"); 164. "Against the Best" (VSトッププレイヤー, "VS Toppu Pureiyā"); 165. "Toward the Shining Light" (光の射す方へ, "Hikari no Sasu Hō e"); 166. "The Successor" (継ぐ者, "Tsugu Mono"); 167. "Tokyo Tournament Epilogue" (Epilogue of Tokyo Stage(東京編最終話), "Epilogue of Tokyo Stage (Tōkyō-hen Saishū wa)"); 168. "On to Nationals!" (全国編スタート, "Zenkoku-hen Sutāto"); 169. "The Body of God" (髪の棲む肉体, "Kami no Sumu Karada")
Both teams argue about the wind as a deciding factor for them, and in the first attack, Kotaro demonstrates it by scoring a field goal with a swerving kick (20–7). When the wind prevents Hiruma from passing, it seems the only available play is to run. However, Sena is stopped by Akaba several times, until he surprises Bando by passing backward to Hiruma, who uses his real pass ability to have Monta scoring a touchdown (20–14). Both Kotaro and Musashi score field goals for their teams (23–17) as Taki fails twice to block Akaba. When there is around only one minute left, Taki is able to stop Bando's runner and it forces Kotaro to kick the ball. Sena retrieves the ball and crosses all the field in the speed light to score a touchdown. After Deimon win by 24–23, Ojo win over Seibu that had to rely only on Riku because Tetsuma was suspended when he attacked Monta to prevent him from attacking the referee. Some days later, the Devil Bats discover their first match in the Kanto Tournament will be against the nine-time winners Shinryuji Naga. Later, Agon Kongo and Hiruma are invited to an interview with reporter Riko, who wants to interview Kanto's aces.

=== Volumes 20–37 ===
No.	Title	Original release date	English release date
20	Devils vs. Gods; DEVIL VS GOD	August 4, 2006; 978-4-08-874141-3	June 3, 2008; 978-1-4215-1625-7
170. "Interview 8"; 171. "Pieces of a Dream" (夢のかけら, "Yume no Kakera"); 172. "The Lion and the Rabbit" (獅子搏兎, "Shishi Hakuto"); 173. "Devils vs. Gods" (DEVIL VS GOD); 174. "Sky Dragon"; 175. "Dark Dragon"; 176. "Flying Dragon"; 177. "Godspeed Impulses" (神速のインパルス, "Shinsoku no Inparusu"); 178. "Game Over"
As Hiruma reveals to Agon they have a secret weapon for the game against Shinryuji, Doburoku says to Yukimitsu he will be playing in the match. Before the match, Musashi reveals he, Hiruma and Kurita tried to join the Shinryuji Naga, but because Kurita could not pass the entrance exam, they went to Deimon. When the match starts, the skill discrepancy between Monta and Shinryuji's receiver, Ikkyu Hosokawa, is noticeable. Agon, considered a genius player who appears only once in a century, also shows his abilities against Sena and Hiruma's attempt to stop him. Because of his arrogance, Agon usually does not play against weaker teams but he carries a certain grudge against Hiruma and Kurita and decides to play both in offense and defense. He wants to show no mercy and opts for the "Dragon Fly" tactic, in which both him and his twin brother, Unsui, play as quarterbacks and receivers. Deimon try all their tactics to stop it and to try to counterattack. However, when the first half ends and it is 32–0, Hiruma says the outcome of the match is clear and that they should not hurt themselves because they have another chance the following year.
21	They Were 11! 11 Nin Iru!! (11人居る!!)	October 4, 2006; 978-4-08-874264-9	August 5, 2008; 978-1-4215-1626-4
179. "The Believers" (信ずるもの, "Shinzuru Mono"); 180. "The Twelfth Athlete" (12人目のアスリート, "12 Nin Me no Asurīto"); 181. "The Power of Mediocrity" (凡才の刃, "Bonsai no Yaiba"); 182. "Hiruma vs. the Kongos" (ヒル魔VS金剛兄弟, "Hiruma VS Kongō Kyōdai"); 183. "Instinct" (本能, "Honnō"); 184. "They Were 11!" (11人居る!!, "11 Nin Iru!!"); 185. "Agon and Unsui" (阿含と雲水, "Agon to Unsui"); 186. "Twenty-one is Game Point" (決勝点は21, "Kesshō Ten wa 21"); 187. "Ave Maria" (アヴェ·マリア, "Abe Maria")
In fact, Hiruma was lying about giving up but he wanted to surprise Shinryuji so he did not tell anyone his plan, except for Musashi and Mamori. He believed his teammates would notice and Musashi does an onside kick that is caught by Komusubi. Because of his lack of stamina, Yukimitsu is only allowed to enter now. He is underestimaded by Agon and Ikkyuy and ends up unmarked, so he is able to score a touchdown because of his capacity of analysing the opponents movements and the best route option. In the sequence, as they cannot let Shinryuji to score anymore to win, Sena tries to blitz Agon in every play. While he fails twice, he is able to intercept a pass when Agon is not the runner but the receiver. Amidst a confusion, Jumonji takes the ball and when Agon grabs him in front of the goal line he drags Agon and scores a touchdown. When Sena uses his arms to block Agon's chop and Kurita is able to sackle Unsui, it seems they are progressing. However, Unsui opts for a safer field goal and the gap of 21 points (35–14) seems unovercomable. As they are desperate, Monta says he will overcome Ikkyu and Hiruma does a highspeed pass to him.
22	Time-out 0 TIMEOUT 0	December 4, 2006; 978-4-08-874290-8	October 7, 2008; 978-1-4215-1955-5
188. "Duel in the Air" (刹那空中決戦, "Setsuna Kūchū Kessen"); 189. "The Self-Professed Number One" (No.1を哮る者, "No. 1 o Takeru Mono"); 190. "A Force to Be Reckoned With" (無視できない男, "Mushi Dekinai Otoko"); 191. "Destroyer"; 192. "Time-out 0" (TIMEOUT 0); 193. "Time Control Magician"; 194. "Ambush in Motion" (伏兵のインモーション, "Fukuhei no In Mōshon"); 195. "The Reaper" (死神, "Shinigami"); 196. "A Miracle in Hand" (奇跡はその手の中に, "Kiseki wa Sono Te no Naka ni")
Monta overcomes Ikkyu and scores a touchdown. However, Sena's legs are not bearing to blitz Agon every time. So Hiruma stages a fight between him and Musashi over Sena's state and in the following play Sena ignores Agon to successfully blitz Unsui. In the next play, Sena overcomes Agon by attacking him when he disdains about their Christmas Bowl dream and scores a touchdown (35–28). With five minutes remaining, Ikkyu joins Agon and Unsui to form a three-quarterback "Golden Dragon Fly" that is unstoppable. When Unsui punts the ball, there is only minute left for Deimon's attack that initiates from 97 yards to Shinryuji's line. Deimon advances just a few yards using tactics to stop the clock, like getting the ball outside the field and spiking. Initially they use the rule that any player, except for those on the furthermost line, can move freely to have Yukimitsu helping to block but unexpectedly they use it to throw a long pass to Monta. Although he can surpass Ikkyu he is still 20 yards to the goal line when he is stopped by Agon and the time ends. However, Monta reveals his hand was out of the field when he fell. So there is four seconds left when Hiruma asks the audience to scream louder.
23	Then Came the Showdown! Soshite Kessen e (そして決戦へ)	February 2, 2007; 978-4-08-874316-5	December 2, 2008; 978-1-4215-1956-2
197. "0.1 Seconds" (0.1秒, "0.1 Byō"); 198. "Last-Ditch Huddle" (答無きハドル, "Kotae Naki Hadoru"); 199. "Gambler"; 200. "Real Monster"; 201. "Ancient Civilization vs. Ancient Creatures" (古代文明VS古代生物, "Kodai Bunmei VS Kodai Seibutsu"); 202. "Tyrannosaurus"; 203. "The Trident Tackle"; 204. "Then Came the Showdown!" (そして決戦へ, "Soshite Kessen e"); 205. "Warriors' Day Off" (戦士の安息日, "Senshi no Ansokubi")
Hiruma's appeal to the public was just a diversion and the play starts with Kurita passing to Sena instead of Hiruma. However, Sena's run is also a diversion and he passes again to Hiruma, who scores a touchdown (35–34). As the time is out they can only complete their conversion attempt, and they decide to go to a two-point conversion because Sena would not be able to run in an overtime. It seems Hiruma is going to run but he passes the ball to Sena who tries to catch it in air. The ball escapes from Sena's hand and it seems Agon will catch it but them Kurita shows his incredible strength blocking four players and Sena is able to complete the conversion. In the following match, Tayo Sphinx forfeit after Hakushu Dinosaurs' Rikiya Gao injuries all linemen. After Seibu beat Misaki Wolves, Shin requests Riku to teach his running technique so he can perfect his tackle. During Ojo's win over Sado Strong Golem, Shin shows his new ability and Sena longs to face him in the semi-finals.
24	The Indomitable Fortress; Muteki Jōsai (無敵城塞)	April 4, 2007; 978-4-08-874340-0	February 3, 2009; 978-1-4215-2393-4
206. "The Kingdom's New Century" (王国の新世紀, "Ōkoku no Shin Seiki"); 207. "He Who Would Be No. 1" (No.1を狙う者, "No. 1 o Nerau Mono"); 208. "Storm" (嵐, "Arashi"); 209. "The Last Ceremony" (最期のセレモニー, "Saigo no Seremonī"); 210. "Opening Fanfare" (開戦のファンファーレ, "Kaisen no Fanfāre"); 211. "'Prison Chain' Ikari" (怒りのプリズンチェーン, "Ikari no Purizunchēn"); 212. "Risk: 100%" (RISK100%); 213. "The Indomitable Fortress" (無敵城塞, "Muteki Jōsai"); 214. "The World of Three" (3人の世界, "3 Nin no Sekai")
During Ojo high school's festival, Hiruma discovers Ojo won over their university counterpart and that they have a tactic known as "Ballista" in which Shin also play as an offensive player. To oppose Ojo, Deimon do a special training in which the players wear surgical masks during all day to improve their stamina. When the match starts, Sena takes the kickoff and runs until he is stopped by lineman Daigo Ikari. Out of control, Ikari tries to attack Sena out of the field and is stopped by Jumonji. In their field confrontation, however, Jumonji loses to Ikari, forcing Hiruma to come up with a new tactic. They then attack with four potential receivers—Monta, Sena, Taki and Yukimitsu—and Monta advances some yards. As it is clear Monta is better than the defensive player marking him, Sakuraba is requested to play both on offense and defense. When it occurs, Deimon's first three attack attempts are blocked by Sakuraba or Shin. Then in the last down Musashi converts a field goal, even with Shin's pressure.
25	Perfect Player	July 4, 2007; 978-4-08-874383-7	April 7, 2009; 978-1-4215-2394-1
215. "Ballista"; 216. "Everest's Peak" (最頂のエベレスト, "Saichō no Eberesuto"); 217. "Perfect Player"; 218. "Seijuro Shin" (進清十郎, "Shin Seijūrō"); 219. "Ace Up the Sleeve" (切り札1枚, "Kirifuda 1 Mai"); 220. "Muddy Ground Battle" (泥まみれの地上戦, "Doromamire no Chijōsen"); 221. "Versus the Unrivaled Cavaliers" (VS無双騎士団, "VS Musō Kishi Dan"); 222. "Twenty Minutes"; 223. "Right in the Face" (ガチ, "Gachi")
26	Rough-n-Tumble; Kakutō Kyūgi (格闘球技)	September 4, 2007; 978-4-08-874412-4	June 2, 2009; 978-1-4215-2621-8
224. "Crazy Crasher"; 225. "The Third Eye" (第三の目, "Daisan no Me"); 226. "Fire Starter"; 227. "Tag-Team Match" (タッグマッチ, "Taggu Macchi"); 228. "Two Aces" (二人のエース, "Futari no Ēsu"); 229. "Rough-n-Tumble" (格闘球技, "Kakutō Kyūgi"); 230. "Ball Carrier" (その手に掴む者, "Sono Te ni Tsukamu Mono"); 231. "Death Card"; 232. "Death Game"
27	Seijuro Shin vs. Sena Kobayakawa; Shin Seijūrō VS Kobayakawa Sena (進清十郎 VS 小早川瀬那)	November 2, 2007; 978-4-08-874433-9	August 4, 2009; 978-1-4215-2622-5
233. "LIMIT BREAK"; 234. "A Game in the Mist" (勝負は霧の中に, "Shōbu wa Kiri no Naka Ni"); 235. "The Wings of the Devil" (悪魔の両翼, "Akuma no Ryōyoku"); 236. "Only Desperation" (執念一つ, "Shūnen Hitotsu"); 237. "Holy War" (聖戦, "Seisen"); 238. "Momentary Monologue" (刹那のモノローグ, "Setsuna no Monorōgu"); 239. "Seijuro Shin vs. Sena Kobayakawa" (進清十郎 vs 小早川瀬那, "Shin Seijūrō VS Kobayakawa Sena"); 240. "Rainy Days and Sunny Days" (雨の日も晴の日も, "Ame no Hi mo Hare no Hi mo"); 241. "Flowers for All Opponents" (全ての敵に花束を, "Subete no Teki ni Hanataba o")
28	Showdown at Tokyo Dome; Kessen no Tōkyō Dōmu (決戦の東京ドーム)	February 4, 2008; 978-4-08-874474-2	October 6, 2009; 1-4215-2623-9
242. "The Beasts That Feed on Victory" (勝利を喰らう獣たち, "Shōri o Kurau Kemono-tachi"); 243. "The Beautiful Beast" (実に美しき野獣よ, "Ge ni Utsukushiki Yajū Yo"); 244. "HUNGRY"; 245. "A Piece of a Dream" (夢ひとひら, "Yume Hitohira"); 246. "Honors Inscribed on Your Tomb" (墓標に誉れ高き名を, "Bohyō ni Homare Takaki Na o"); 247. "Showdown at Tokyo Dome" (決戦の東京ドーム, "Kessen no Tōkyō Dōmu"); 248. "Yoichi Hiruma (Part 1)" (蛭魔 妖一〔上〕, "Hiruma Yoichi (Jō)"); 249. "Yoichi Hiruma (Part 2)" (蛭魔妖一〔中〕, "Hiruma Yoichi (Chū)"); 250. "Yoichi Hiruma (Part 3)" (蛭魔妖一〔下〕, "Hiruma Yoichi (Shita)")
29	Second Quarterback; Nidaime no Kuōtābakku (二代目のクォーターバック)	April 4, 2008; 978-4-08-874495-7	December 1, 2009; 1-4215-2776-6
251. "The Only Rule in Battle" (戦場のルール, "Senjō no Rūru"); 252. "The Final" (決勝, "Fainaru"); 253. "A Lone Warrior on the Battlefield" (戦士は独り戦場へ, "Senshi wa Hitori Senjō e"); 254. "Right Arm, Left Arm" (右腕&左腕, "Migi Ude & Hidari Ude"); 255. "Pterosaur Pteranodon" (翼竜プテラノドン, "Yokuryū Puteranodon"); 256. "The Cunning Hunter" (狡猾なるハンター, "Kōkatsu Naru Hantā"); 257. "Hiruma vs. Marco" (ヒル魔vsマルコ, "Hiruma vs Maruko"); 258. "Dreamlight" (夢の灯, "Yume no Akari"); 259. "Second Quarterback" (二代目のクォーターバック, "Nidaime no Kuōtābakku")
30	This Is Football; THIS IS AN AMERICAN FOOTBALL	June 4, 2008; 978-4-08-874523-7	February 2, 2010; 1-4215-2813-4
260. "Rookie" (ルーキー, "Rūkī"); 261. "True Believers" (盲信者たち, "Mōshinsha-tachi"); 262. "This Is Football" (THIS IS AN AMERICAN FOOTBALL); 263. "Un-dead"; 264. "Dead Man" (死者, "Deddo Man"); 265. "Stone Gargoyle" (悪魔の石像, "Akuma no Sekizō"); 266. "A Desperate Long Pass" (命のロングパス, "Inochi no Rongu Pasu"); 267. "A Crushing Blow" (鉄槌, "Tettsui"); 268. "He Only Sees the Top" (その男はただ頂上だけを見て, "Sono Otoko wa Tada Itadau Dake o Mite")
31	And the Winner Is...	August 4, 2008; 978-4-08-874553-4	April 6, 2010; 1-4215-2927-0
269. "The Strongest Guardian" (最強の守護獣, "Saikyō no Gādian"); 270. "Devil Dragon"; 271. "Runner's Soul"; 272. "Winning" (勝て., "Kate."); 273. "And the Winner Is..."; 274. "MVP"; 275. "The Quarterback of the Strongest Empire" (最強帝国のクォーターバック, "Saikyō Teikoku no Kuōtābakku"); 276. "Teikoku Academy Study Tour" (帝黒学園見学ツアー!, "Teikoku Gakuen Kengaku Tsuā!"); 277. "All-Star" (オールスター, "Ōrusutā")
32	Christmas Bowl; Xmas BOWL	November 4, 2008; 978-4-08-874590-9	July 6, 2010; 1-4215-3162-3
278. "The Strongest Personal Coach" (最高のマンツーマンコーチ, "Saikō no Mantsūman Kōchi"); 279. "The Best Glove in the World" (世界一のグローブ, "Sekaīchi no Gurōbu"); 280. "Natural Genius" (天賦の才, "Tenpu no Sai"); 281. "Christmas Bowl" (Xmas BOWL); 282. "All-Star Spirits" (ALLSTAR SPIRITS); 283. "Absolute Prediction" (絶対予告, "Zettai Yokoku"); 284. "Bloodline of Sky Riders" (天空人の血族, "Tenkūbito no Ketsuzoku"); 285. "Karin Koizumi" (小泉香燐, "Koizumi Karin"); 286. "Run VS Run"
33	The Devil's Mistake; Akuma no Misu (悪魔のミス)	January 5, 2009; 978-4-08-874616-6	October 5, 2010; 1-4215-3231-X
287. "Caesar's Charge" (帝王のチャージ, "Shīzāzu no Chāji"); 288. "Chris Cross"; 289. "Aerial Battles are Starting Contests" (空中戦はにらめっこ, "Kūchū Sen wa Niramekko"); 290. "Darrell Royal's Letter" (ダレル·ロイヤルの手紙, "Dareru Roiyaru no Tegami"); 291. "The Last Huddle" (最後のハドル, "Saigo no Hadoru"); 292. "Card No.21"; 293. "x8" 294. "The Ball Still Lives" (ボールは生きている, "Bōru wa Ikiteiru"); 295. "The Devil's Mistake" (悪魔のミス, "Akuma no Misu")
34	The Last of the Deimon Devil Bats	March 4, 2009; 978-4-08-874641-8	January 4, 2011; 1-4215-3306-5
296. "The Path of a New Dimension" (新次元の道, "Shin Jigen no Michi"); 297. "Back to Back, Deimon" (背中合わせの悪魔たち, "Senakāwase no Akuma-tachi"); 298. "Brains to Idiots" (バカに頭脳, "Baka Ni Zunō"); 299. "The Weakest Teammate" (最弱のチームメイト, "Saijaku no Chīmumeito"); 300. "The Empire's Triumphal Return Parade" (帝国凱旋パレード, "Teikoku Gaisen Parēdo"); 301. "Run" (走(ラン), "Hashi (Ran)"); 302. "Listening to the Breath of the Ball" (ボールの吐息を聴け, "Bōru no Toiki o Kike"); 303. "The Last of the Deimon Devil Bats"; 304. "Finale"; 305. "I Am An American Footballer"
35	The World Is Mine	May 1, 2009; 978-4-08-874664-7	April 5, 2011; 1-4215-3577-7
306. "World Cup"; 307. "Great Gathering" (大集結せよ!!, "Dai Shūketsu Seyo!!"); 308. "Team Japan"; 309. "The World Is Mine"; 310. "Japan vs. Russia" (JAPAN VS RUSSIA); 311. "Burn, Rookie" (燃えよルーキー, "Moeyo Rūkī"); 312. "Toward a New Generation" (新世代へ, "Shin Sedai e"); 313. "Ambition" (野心, "Yashin"); 314. "I Love American Football"; 315. "Pentagram" (五芒の星, "Gobō no Hoshi")
36	Sena vs. Panther	August 4, 2009; 978-4-08-874713-2	July 5, 2011; 1-4215-3684-6
316. "Emperor Road" (帝王学, "Teiō Gaku"); 317. "The Cards That Were Dealt" (配られたカードは, "Kubara Reta Kādo wa"); 318. "Countdown 13"; 319. "United States of America"; 320. "The Country Of Merit" (実力の国, "Chikara no Kuni"); 321. "I Am No.1"; 322. "Sena vs. Panther"; 323. "Double Ace Runners" (Wエースランナー, "Daburu Ēsu Rannā"); 324. "Poem of Resurrection" (復活の詩, "Fukkatsu no Uta")
37	Ready Set Hut	October 2, 2009; 978-4-08-874735-4	October 4, 2011; 978-1-4215-3685-9
325. "Double Devil"; 326. "Lecture on How to Handle Cards by Yoichi Hiruma and Clifford D. Lewis" (ヒル魔妖一とクリフォード·D·ルイスのカード捌き講座, "Hiruma Yōichi to Kurifōdo Di Ruisu no Kādo Sabaki Kōza"); 327. "As Long As There is a Path" (途があるならば, "Toga Aru Naraba"); 328. "Tag Match"; 329. "One of the Trash Stars" (屑星一つ, "Kuzu Boshi Hitotsu"); 330. "The Eyes of a Male" (雄の眼, "Osu no Manazashi"); 331. "My Dream" (僕の夢は, "Boku no Yume wa"); 332. "Do You Want to Kiss Your Sister?"; 333. "Ready Set Hut"
