= Defensive tackle =

Position in American football

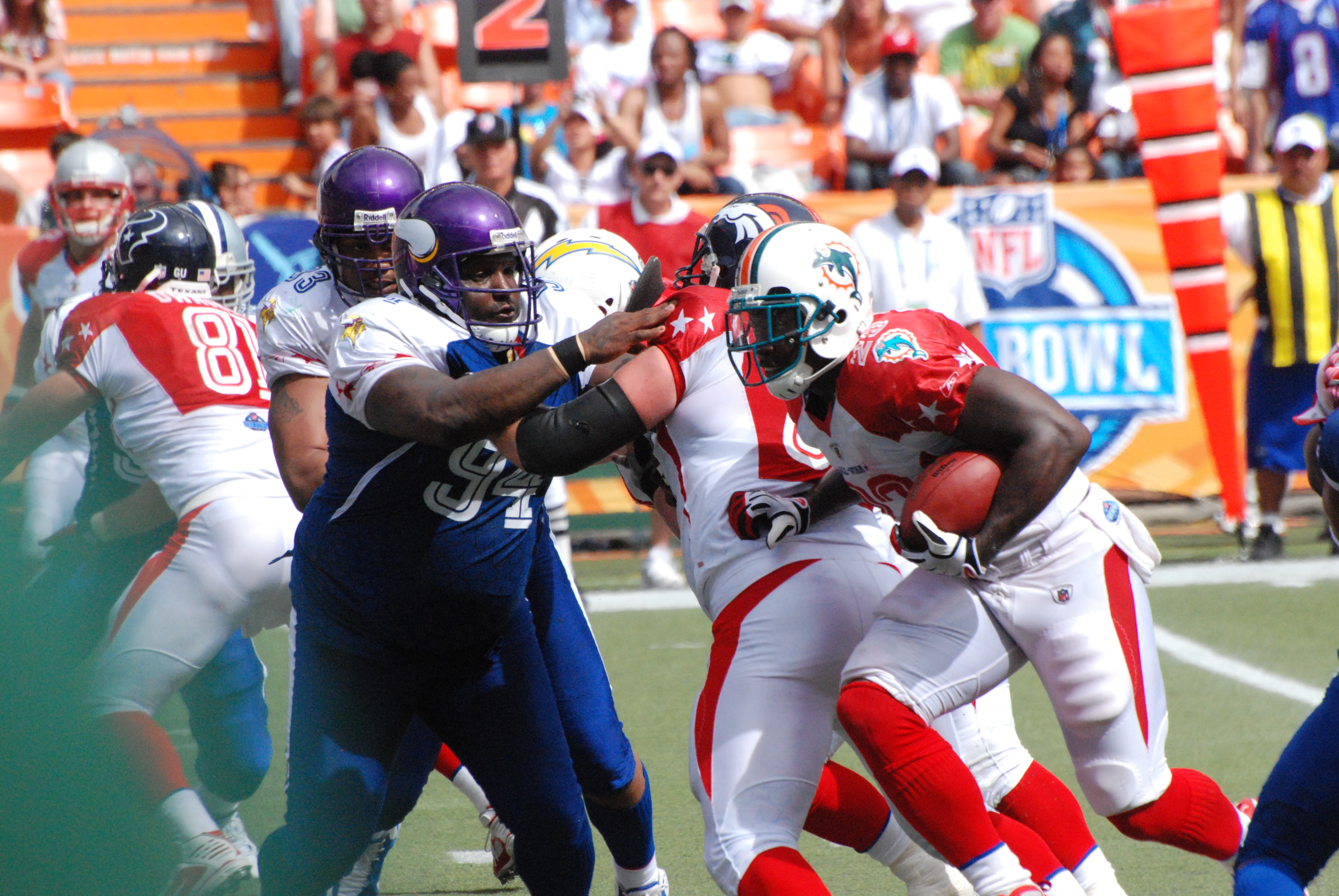
Defensive tackle Pat Williams (in blue) with the Minnesota Vikings in 2009

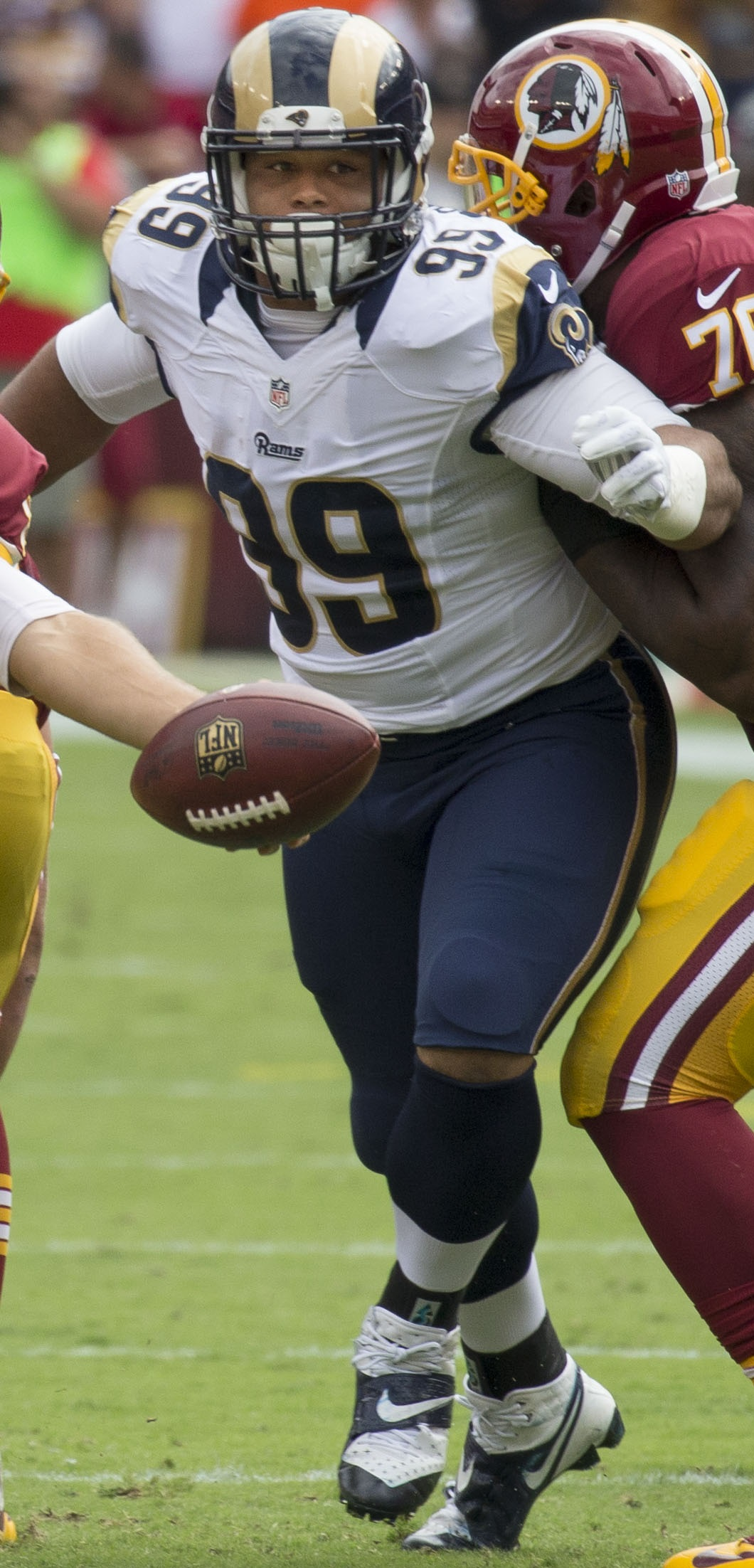
St. Louis Rams defensive tackle Aaron Donald shedding a block

A defensive tackle (DT) is a position in American football that typically lines up on the line of scrimmage, opposite one of the offensive guards; however, he may also line up opposite one of the offensive tackles. Defensive tackles are typically the largest and strongest of the defensive players. Depending on a team's defensive scheme, a defensive tackle may be called upon to fill several different roles. These may include merely holding the point of attack by refusing to be moved, or penetrating a certain gap between offensive linemen to break up a play in the opponent's backfield. If a defensive tackle reads a pass play, his primary responsibility is to pursue the quarterback, or simply knock the pass down at the line if it is within arm's reach. Other responsibilities of the defensive tackle may be to pursue the screen pass or drop into coverage in a zone blitz scheme. In a traditional 4–3 defense, there is no nose tackle. Instead there are a left and a right defensive tackle. Some teams, especially in the National Football League (NFL), have a nose tackle in this scheme, but most of them do not.

== Nose tackle ==
Nose tackle (also nose guard or middle guard) is a defensive alignment position for a defensive lineman. In the 3–4 defensive scheme the sole defensive tackle is referred to as the nose tackle. The nose tackle aligns across the line of scrimmage from the offense's center before the play begins in the "0-technique" position. In this position, frequently taking on the center and at least one if not both of the guards, the nose tackle is considered to be the most physically demanding position in gridiron football. In five-linemen situations, such as a goal-line formation, the nose tackle is the innermost lineman, flanked on either side by a defensive tackle or defensive end. According to Pat Kirwan, a traditional 3–4 defense demands "a massive man who can clog up the middle," while a 4–3 defense is looking for "a nose tackle who relies on quickness to penetrate and move along the front."

A lone nose tackle in a base 3–4 defense formation

Typical 3–4 nose tackles are "big wide bodies who can hold the point of attack and force double teams by the guard and center". They are usually the heaviest players on the roster, with weights ranging from 320 to 350 pounds (145 to 159 kg). Height is critical, as they are supposed to get "under" the offensive line; ideal 3–4 nose tackles are no taller than 6 ft 3 in (1.91 m). Recent examples of such nose tackles include Gilbert Brown, Jamal Williams, Vince Wilfork, and Damon Harrison. Rather uncommon are taller nose tackles, such as Ted Washington and Ma'ake Kemoeatu, both being 6 ft 5 in (1.96 m) tall and past Super Bowl champions. Current notable examples of nose tackles include Dexter Lawrence, Desmond Watson and Vita Vea.

In some 4–3 defenses, the nose tackle is one of two defensive tackles. Some teams, especially in the National Football League, have a nose tackle in the 4–3 defense, who lines up against the opposing center and very likely the weak-side or pulling guard. In a 4–3 defense, nose tackles are rather quick and supposed to "shoot the 'A gap' and beat the center and very likely the weak-side or pulling guard into the backfield." Height is not as important, and their weight is closer to 300 pounds (136 kg).

The terms "nose guard" or "middle guard" were more commonly used with the five-man defensive line of the older 5–2 defense. Effective against most plays of the day, but with a weakness to the inside short pass, the 5–2 was phased out of the professional game in the late 1950s. In the 4–3 defense, the upright middle linebacker replaced the middle guard. The nose tackle is also used in a 50 read defense. In this defense there is a nose tackle, two defensive tackles, and two outside linebackers who can play on the line of scrimmage or off the line of scrimmage in a two-point stance. The nose tackle lines up head up on the center about six to eighteen inches off the ball. In a reading 50 defense, the nose tackle's key is to read the offensive center to the ball. In run away, the nose tackle's job is to shed the blocker and pursue down the line of scrimmage, taking an angle of pursuit. The primary responsibility of the nose tackle in this scheme is to absorb multiple blockers so that other players in the defensive front can attack ball carriers and rush the quarterback.

== 3-technique tackle ==
A 3-technique tackle (also 3-tech) or undertackle is often featured in a formation with four defensive linemen (such as the traditional 4–3 or the 4–2–5 Nickel defense), but can sometimes fill in as the nose tackle in a 3–4 defense. Compared to the 0 or 1-tech who is more similar to the nose tackle, the 3-tech is often a leaner, more agile defensive lineman (but still larger than the defensive ends) who specializes in penetrating through the line with his quickness as his bigger counterpart occupies blockers, aiming to sack the quarterback or tackle the rusher (often the running back) for a loss of yards. The 3-tech often lines up against the "weak side" of the offensive line, and therefore faces fewer double-teams. Notable examples of prototypical 3-tech tackles in the NFL include Geno Atkins, Sharrif Floyd, Tyrone Crawford, Kyle Williams, Ndamukong Suh, Aaron Donald, and Ed Oliver. Donald and Oliver, in particular, have pushed the limits on how small a 3-tech can be, both weighing just 285 lbs. Their smaller statures have drawn criticism, but Donald and Oliver often make up for this using their athleticism. Donald, in particular, never missed the Pro Bowl during his decade-long career, made 8 All-Pro teams, and was a 3 time AP Defensive Player of the Year, ultimately cementing his legacy as one of the greatest defenders of all time.

== History ==
In the early days of one-platoon football, tackle was an offensive and defensive position. However, certain players specialized. For example, Bronko Nagurski played fullback on offense, and DT on defense.
