= Screen pass =

Kind of play in North American football

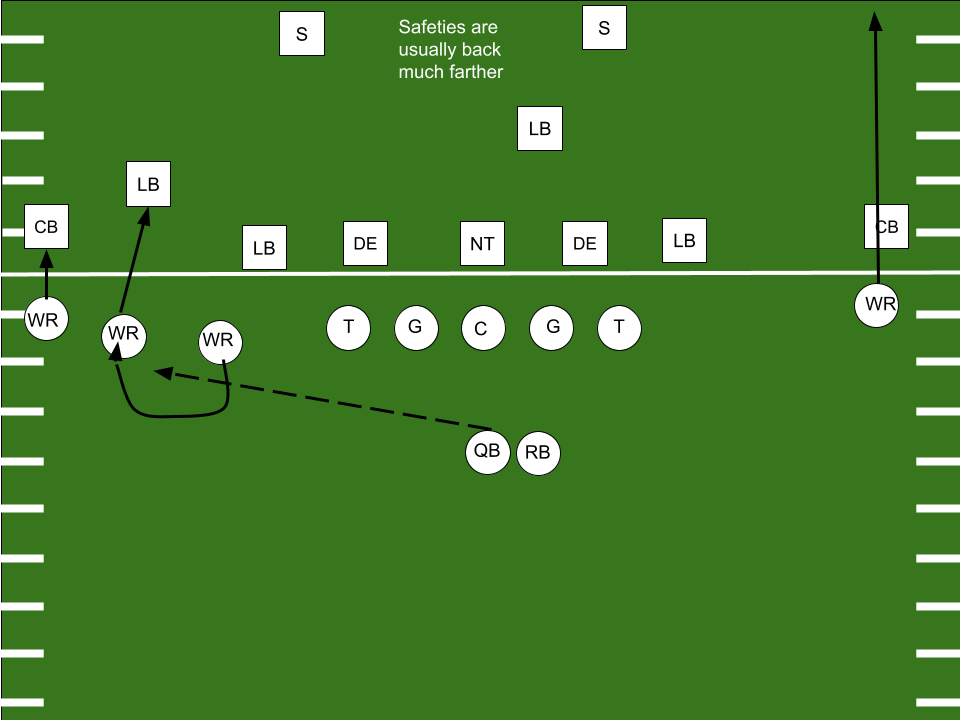
This is an example of a bubble screen pass against a basic 3-4 defense. The two outside wide receivers on the left will block for the slot receiver running the bubble screen.

A screen pass is a play in gridiron football consisting of a short pass to a receiver who is protected by a screen of blockers. During a screen pass, a number of things happen concurrently in order to fool the defense into thinking a long pass is being thrown, when in fact the pass is merely a short one, just beyond the defensive linemen. Screens are usually deployed against aggressive defenses that rush the passer. Because screens invite the defense to rush the quarterback, they are designed to leave fewer defensive players behind the rushers to stop the play.

== Use ==
A screen pass can be effective, but it can also be risky as it is rather easy for a defensive player, even a lineman, to intercept the pass if a defender gets between the quarterback and the intended receiver—something that only happens if the offensive line misses a block, the quarterback takes too long to throw or the defense overwhelms the offensive line. If the pass is intercepted, there are often few offensive players in front of the intercepting player, thus making it much easier for the intercepting team to earn a large return or to score a touchdown.

The frequent use of the screen pass is a distinguishing feature of the West Coast offense.

== Types ==
Screens come in many forms. A screen to a running back to either the strong or short side of the field in the flats is often just called a screen. Screens to wide receivers come in four forms: the bubble screen, middle screen, slot screen, and slip screen.

The bubble screen was essentially created by Don Read when he was head coach of the Montana Grizzlies, and Lou Holtz, head coach of the Notre Dame Fighting Irish, brought the play into prominence after calling Read and asking for the play. The bubble screen involves a receiver taking a step forward, then darting toward the quarterback to receive the ball while the offensive linemen release to clear a path for the receiver. The benefit of the bubble screen is that it works against either zone or man-to-man coverage. A downside is that it is dependent on proper timing; a zone blitz or defensive end dropping into coverage can disrupt the timing, and may result in the quarterback being sacked.

The middle screen is similar to the bubble screen, except that the receiver continues his route to the middle of the field. The linemen release up the middle of the field in front of the receiver.

== Shovel pass ==
A screen pass is sometimes executed using a shovel pass throwing motion. To throw a shovel pass the quarterback palms the football, and "shovels" the pass directly forward to the receiver, usually with a backhand, underhand, or pushing motion. When a designed play calls for the quarterback to use a shovel pass forward to a receiver it is, by definition, also a screen pass. Because the pass appears to be a fumble if not completed, some defenses attempt to recover the ball as a turnover.

The Utah Pass is an overhand forward shovel pass of the ball popularized by the Utah Utes football team and Lee Grosscup. The play is commonly used by teams that use a spread offense.

== Offensive action during a screen pass play ==
The quarterback drops back as if he is going to pass the ball deep. The offensive line sets up in pass protection for usually one to two seconds, then releases and lets the defensive line go. The player receiving the screen pass moves behind the releasing linemen and waits for the ball. The outside receivers run clear-out routes in order to make a path for the screen coming behind them.

If run properly, the defensive backs will be run out of the play by the receivers, and the defensive line will penetrate too far to stop the short pass from being thrown. The only defenders left will be linebackers, which will be picked up by the "screen" of offensive linemen in front of the receiver—hence the name "screen pass".

== Types of plays ==
There are a number of variation on screen pass plays. The "conventional" screen features the running back (the action described above). This type of play is something of a scripted checkdown.

A tight end screen is where the tight end takes the place of the running back in the above description.

The wide receiver screen (or "jailbreak screen") is where the linemen sprint out in front of the wide receiver catching the screen pass. However, the blocking may be as simple as one receiver blocking ahead of another. A wide receiver screen thrown to a receiver moving towards the quarterback, behind one or more blocking receivers, is also commonly called a "tunnel screen".

The "quarterback throwback" screen is where the quarterback will pitch to a running back or throw a short pass to a wide receiver, and run the opposite direction, with releasing linemen in front of him. The running back or wideout will then lateral, or "throw it back" to the quarterback, with offensive linemen leading him downfield. This is also known as a "Blitz Beater" or "Blitz" for short, because it's almost always used against a blitz-heavy defense, also called that because when it can be seen a blitz is coming, this is a common play called to counter it, and the overpursuing nature of the blitz leaves the running back, and then the quarterback wide open with the possibility of gaining huge chunks of yardage. The "quarterback throwback" has been known to force defenses to blitz less, because one successful play can turn into a quick touchdown with a mobile quarterback.

The "middle screen" has the same type of action as a "conventional" screen, but the linemen remain in the middle of the field rather than releasing to either side.

A trick play variant of the screen pass involves an offensive tackle. The tackle must back up so that their hands are even with or behind the passer's and receives a lateral or backward pass. In a further evolution of trickery, the pass can be bounced (since any backward pass is a live ball) to fool the defense into thinking it is an incomplete forward pass; this trick can be achieved with either the offensive tackle or an eligible receiver. In turn, because a backward pass is a live ball even after hitting the ground, it increases the risk of a turnover if the intended receiver fails to catch the ball.
