= Checkdown =

Type of pass in American or Canadian football

In gridiron football, a checkdown pass is when the quarterback attempts to complete a short, accurate pass, typically to a running back or tight end, as a last option when the primary option(s) as designed by the play call are covered. The term means that the quarterback has "checked down" his list of receivers. Because the quarterback does not look for the checkdown pass until after they have scanned for open receivers down the field for about 3–4 seconds, the defensive line has had time to enter the backfield and so a checkdown pass is often thrown in the face of pressure from the defensive line. Alternatively, if the quarterback is inexperienced or the defensive team has sent a blitz, with linebackers and/or defensive backs also looking to sack the quarterback, the checkdown may also turn out to be the quarterback's second or even first look.

A screen pass and a checkdown are different, because a screen pass is designed primarily to go to the short route after drawing in pass rushers.
