= Zone blitz =

American football tactic

In American football, a zone blitz is a defensive tactic that sends additional players to rush the opposing team's quarterback, whilst also unexpectedly redirecting a supposed pass rushing player into pass coverage instead. This tactic also includes zone coverage (rather than man-to-man coverage).

Like a conventional blitz, the zone blitz tactic assigns five or more players to rush the quarterback in a single down, rather than the usual three or four players. However, unlike a conventional blitz, the zone blitz uses players who are initially positioned to rush (for example, the defensive ends) to instead give pass coverage. For example, a zone blitz may involve two linebackers adding to the rush of three defensive linemen, while a fourth lineman unexpectedly moves into pass coverage.

As in other blitzes, using additional rushers is intended to hurry the quarterback, and potentially cause an incomplete pass, sack, fumble or interception. Redirecting a player who was expected to rush is intended to confuse the pass protection assignments of the offensive line, tight ends and backs, who may now be unsure of which rusher to block. Although blitzing leaves fewer defenders in pass coverage, the relatively safer zone coverage system reduces the risk of conceding a long touchdown pass.

== History ==
Miami Dolphins defensive coach Bill Arnsparger developed the zone blitz in 1971. He started by placing linebackers on the defensive line and having them drop back into coverage, and eventually included regular defensive linemen as well. The scheme did not gain widespread use in professional football until Dick LeBeau refined it with the Cincinnati Bengals and popularized the zone blitz in the early '90s, while being the defensive coordinator for the Pittsburgh Steelers, earning Pittsburgh the title of "Blitzburgh". Though the zone blitz has become common throughout the NFL, the 3–4 defense—3 defensive linemen, 4 linebackers—lends itself particularly well to this style of play, and LeBeau continued to utilize it as the defensive coordinator of the Tennessee Titans as recently as the 2017 season.

== Base formations ==
The zone blitz is usually executed from one of three zone coverage formations.

=== Cover One ===
Cover one is identical to cover zero (where there is no man covering deep into the field, making the coverage mostly man-to-man) with one major exception. One player, typically the weakside or "free" safety is left with no man responsibilities, and can instead roam the intermediate to deep zones.

=== Cover Two ===
In cover two, each safety (free and strong) covers a deep half of the field, while the two cornerbacks cover the flats (from the line of scrimmage to about 15 yards deep on each sideline). Three linebackers (weak side, middle, and strong side) drop into coverage, with each patrolling 1/5 of the middle field. A variant of this, the Tampa 2, has been used by the Buccaneers for years and helped them on their way to their first Super Bowl win. This coverage is also the most popular when zone blitzing.

=== Cover Three ===
Cover three relies on the same basic principles as cover two. The basic difference lies in the responsibilities of the secondary. The free safety plays "center field" while each of the cornerbacks covers a deep third, or one third of the field on each side. The middle of the zone is once again covered by the three linebackers, with the strong safety covering the remaining, far fourth of the middle field.

== The blitz ==
The blitz itself relies upon confusion among the offensive linemen. The linemen assume that the defensive ends and defensive tackles will rush the passer. By using a zone blitz, the defense throws off the blocking assignments of the offensive line by switching the responsibilities of a defensive lineman with those of a linebacker or defensive back. While most regular blitzes do not identify one of the pass rushers, zone blitzes don't identify any of the rushers, or how many will come.

For example, in one of the most common zone blitzes, a defensive end will drop back into coverage, playing one-fourth of the middle zone, while the weak side linebacker, who would normally cover that area, rushes the quarterback in place of the end.

== Fire zone ==
A fire zone blitz is a specific zone blitz in which the defense rushes 5 with a 3–3 coverage behind it—three deep defenders and three underneath defenders. Although the fire zone can be run out of many fronts and alignments, the main points are the weakside defensive end or end man on the line of scrimmage away from the blitz dropping off into coverage, and pressure coming from the opposite side of the field.

For example, in a 4–3 front, the backside defensive end will drop off to the curl and then the flat, while the strong safety will drop down and cover the frontside curl to the flat. The non-blitzing linebacker will take the middle hole and the other two linebackers will stunt with the defensive line to try to pressure the passer.

Typically the other three defensive linemen will slant away from the linebacker blitz.

This type of blitz can be effective because the defensive line may draw some of the protection away from the rushing linebackers, and the defensive end may drop into a passing lane as the quarterback notices the non-blitzing linebacker drift towards the middle of the field.

There are many variants of this blitz from many different looks, but the base concept is a 3-deep, 3-underneath coverage, 5 rushers, and a player up front dropping back into coverage away from the blitz side.

== Advantages ==
The zone blitz is also an effective scheme when defending the screen pass. In a zone blitz especially designed to defend the screen pass, defensive linemen initially identify the running back or other potential recipients of a screen pass in order to cover them specifically rather than dropping into a zone. Covering a specific player is much easier for a defensive lineman who does not normally play in the open field. The blitzing linebackers are at an advantage in screen situations because they are more likely to actually pressure the quarterback who is trying to lure slower defensive linemen upfield and not expecting the significantly more athletic linebackers. The combination of the hurried quarterback and the quickly-covered screen receiver often results in a sack, an interception by a defensive lineman, a tackle for loss of yardage, or an incompletion. A very good example of this defensive scheme by LeBeau is the 100-yard interception return for a touchdown by James Harrison in Super Bowl XLIII. Prior to the play, on the first down and goal from the Pittsburgh 2, the Cardinals quarterback Kurt Warner apparently expected Harrison to rush the passer as the latter usually does, thus designing Anquan Boldin running a slant. But as Warner was dropping back to pass, the inside linebacker Lawrence Timmons blitzed from the inside instead, and Harrison quickly dropped back to cover the slant route by Boldin making an easy interception which he eventually returned for a touchdown.

== Disadvantages ==
The last advantage highlighted above is also perhaps the principal disadvantage to a zone blitz, in that one or more defensive linemen may be required to drop back into coverage while linebackers take their place in rushing the quarterback. Linemen, by design, are the biggest, heaviest, and slowest members of the defense on the field. Asking them to cover a speedy slot receiver or an athletic, pass-catching tight end is often a losing proposition. Most, if not all, linemen, simply do not possess the speed to legitimately cover wide receivers for more than a few yards. These kinds of personnel mismatches can lead to easy completions if the quarterback can correctly identify them.

An additional disadvantage is that a zone blitz is less likely to be effective against the running game than a traditional blitz, since the linemen, often the best defenders against the run, have dropped off of the line of scrimmage in order to participate in pass coverage. For this reason, the zone blitz is most likely to be effective in down and distance situations that dictate a passing play (i.e. third down and more than six yards).

== See also ==
- Blitz (gridiron football)
