= Blitz (gridiron football) =

Gridiron football tactic

In gridiron football, blitz is a tactic used by the defense to disrupt pass attempts by the offense. During a blitz, a higher than usual number of defensive players will rush the opposing quarterback, in an attempt either to tackle them or force them to hurry their pass attempt.

In practice, a blitz involves five or more players rushing during a single down, rather than the four or three rushers used during normal play. For example, in a defense that normally uses four defensive linemen to rush, a blitz can be created by adding one or more linebackers or defensive backs.

Blitzing is a higher-risk strategy, as fewer defensive players are left to cover receivers or to defend against running plays. However, a successful blitz will result in a sack or will force the quarterback into making an error.

The term "blitz" is German for "lightning" and a reference to the blitzkrieg tactic of World War II.

== History ==
The term "red-dog" referred to a rushing linebacker that created a six-on-five matchup against the offensive line; and blitz meant rushing seven, thereby leaving one potential receiver uncovered.

Chuck Drulis is widely credited with inventing the safety blitz in 1960 while serving as defensive coordinator of the St. Louis Cardinals. He had devised a play called "Wildcat" which called for a safety to be the extra pass rusher. He believed the pressure on the quarterback would be severe, since defensive backs had almost never taken part in pass rushes before.

Bill Arnsparger is the likely creator of the zone blitz. A zone blitz is a defensive tactic that sends additional players to rush the opposing team's quarterback, while also unexpectedly redirecting a supposed pass rushing player into pass coverage instead.

Blitzes are a very common play. As of 2025, only six teams in Super Bowl history have not run a blitz during their Super Bowl game, and such teams have a record of 6-0.

== How blitzing works ==
On passing plays, the offense always has at least five people blocking. From the quarterback's left to right, they are the left tackle, left guard, center, right guard, right tackle (known collectively as the offensive line). The quarterback will throw the pass, and is not an available blocker. Any other player is available to block, or to be a target for a pass, depending on the play design and modification by the quarterback and center based on what they see the defense doing.

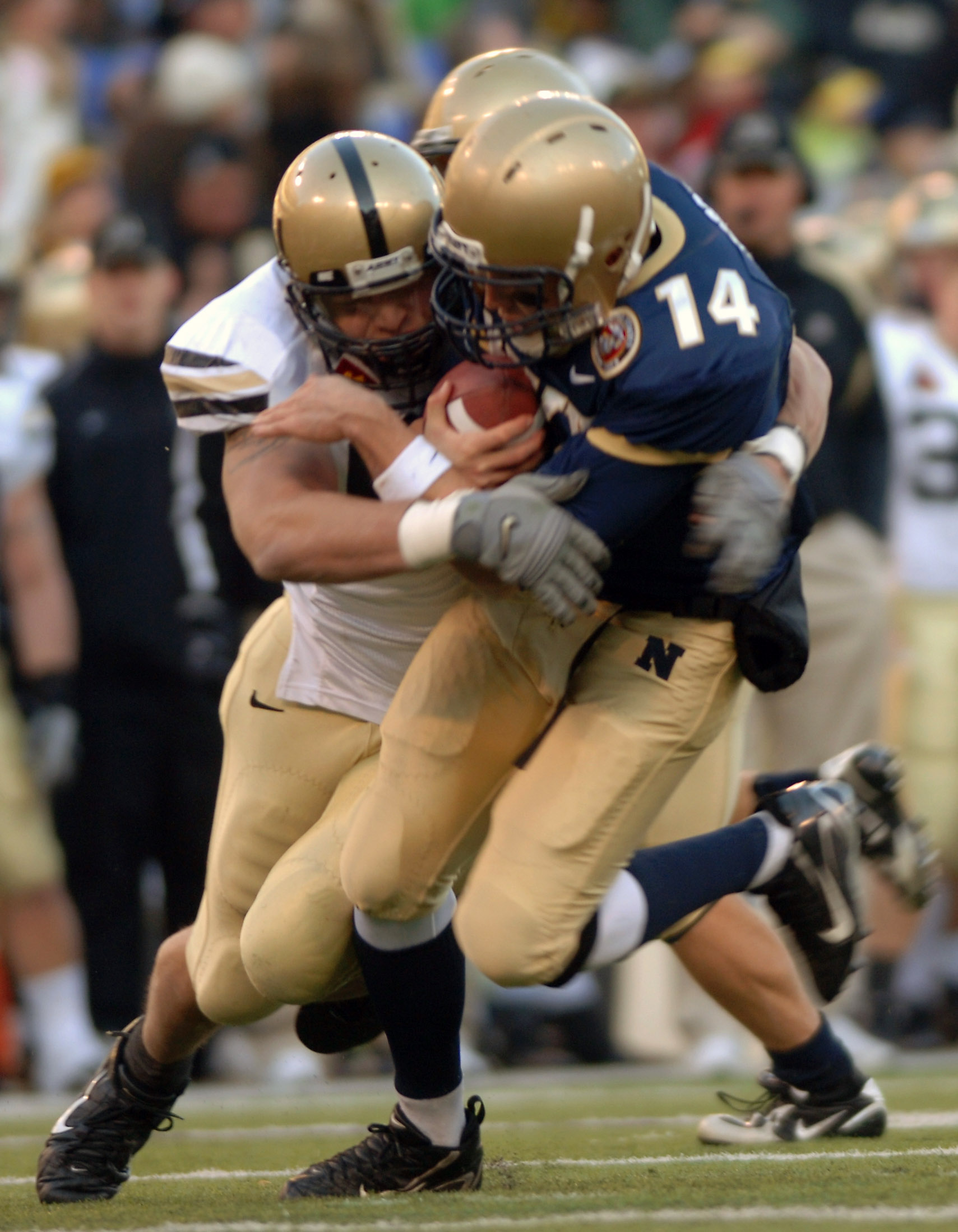
A blitzing defender sacks a QB

By nature, blitzes are risky endeavors for the defense. Since the defense is taking away coverage defenders to rush the quarterback, this usually means that the secondary can not afford to miss any coverage assignments. The defense does not and cannot cover all offensive players, but rather through the blitz, is proactively involved in pressuring the quarterback—specifically, trying to sack them, throw off their timing, or force them to make an error such as an interception or fumble.

The most common blitzes are linebacker blitzes. Less common is sending a defensive back on a blitz, whether safety blitzes in which a safety (usually the free safety) is sent, or corner blitzes where a cornerback is sent. Sending a defensive back on a blitz is even riskier than a linebacker blitz as it removes a primary pass defender from the coverage scheme. Despite this, the pressure is very severe because a blitz by a defensive back is usually not anticipated by the offensive team's blockers.

A blitz is not needed if the front four players on defense can generate sufficient pressure.

== Defensive shells and techniques ==
Blitzes are usually run from "Cover 1" coverage shells, which assign one man to guard the entire deep field, though blitzes can be employed in nearly any type of coverage scheme. Cover 1 is most effective in terms of blitzing because it allows a larger number of defensive players to tighten down on the line of scrimmage, thus increasing the variety of blitzes possible.

Since the main goal is to disrupt the offensive play before it even develops, many blitz packages encourage cornerbacks to play tight man bump and run coverage to disrupt the wide receivers' release and prevent them from running their pre-assigned routes. The non-blitzing safety, usually the free safety, has an enormous amount of field to protect and is at a serious disadvantage if the blitz is unsuccessful and receivers threaten his coverage area or if the offense can quickly move the ball forward through immediate checkdown passes or draw plays. As such, he usually works for depth upon the snap of the ball, backpedaling into his assigned zone.

Linebackers are either blitzing or in pass coverage. Blitzing linebackers can employ various stunts to confuse the offense's blockers and break down their protection scheme. Coverage linebackers in a Cover 1 scheme will usually have man responsibility on a halfback, fullback, or tight end.

Some defensive schemes employ "key" blitzes where a player will blitz only if his assigned man stays in to block, thus keying his action off the action of his man. If his man releases into a pass pattern, then the defensive player will cover him. For example, if weak side linebacker has the fullback as his man, if upon the snap of the ball the fullback blocks, the linebacker will blitz.

== Advantages and disadvantages ==
Advantages gained by blitzing are obvious: proactively disrupt the offense's play before it develops and cause enough pressure on the quarterback to force him into a turnover, sack, or incomplete pass.

Disadvantages abound in any blitz scheme as well. First, the offensive linemen are usually trained to recognize a blitzing player before the snap of the ball. They communicate with each other at the line of scrimmage using code words that shift the protection to the blitzing player's side, thus strengthening their blocking front. The quarterback can also call other players into the protection scheme with audibles if he feels that his current protection is weak. With good protection calls and fundamental blocking principles, some blitzes can be "picked up"—stopped at the point of attack.

Second, the tight man bump and run technique typical of blitz scheme cornerbacks can be defeated with aggressive wide receiver release moves. Once this happens, the cornerback is at a disadvantage and must regain ground and position quickly to prevent a catch. If the blitz is picked up, the wide receiver can create enough separation to become open relatively quickly.

Third, if the blitz is picked up, the one deep defender (usually the free safety) has an enormous amount of territory to guard. If two players simultaneously threaten his zone, he must decide which one to cover. The quarterback can read his reaction and throw to the other receiver, usually for a big gain.

Fourth, if the pass is caught, there are fewer defenders and larger gaps between defenders, meaning that the receiver can get more yards after catch and possibly turn a minimal gain into a dangerous play.

== Playing against the blitz ==
Offenses employ the above procedures to beat the blitz as well as two other techniques and passing route combinations designed to exploit weaknesses in a blitzing scheme.

One of those techniques is called "throwing hot," which entails intentionally leaving one blitzing defensive player unblocked. The offensive line usually makes pre-snap adjustments so that the "free" rusher is clearly within the QB's field of vision. This limits devastating blind-side hits on the QB by rushers. When the preparedness of a quarterback allows him to not have to worry about getting hit from behind, it is one less psychological element of the blitz to be taken away, and thus blitz is incrementally made less effective by that particular element.

The other technique, sometimes used in conjunction with throwing hot, is called sight adjustment. Receivers are taught to run into the empty spot vacated by a blitzing player instead of running their pre-assigned pattern. The QB sees the free rusher or blitzing LB/CB and knows that the receiver will sight adjust accordingly and run a route that takes him into the hole left by the defender.

The West Coast Offense is an offense that focuses on ball control and short passes. This is a well timed offense where the quarterback throws the ball quickly to avoid the rush, but still allow the wide receiver to get behind the blitzing players.

== See also ==
- Glossary of American football
- Zone blitz

== Sources ==
- Gruver, Edward (2002), Nitschke. Lanham:Taylor Trade Publishing. ISBN 1-58979-127-4
