= Running back =

Position in American and Canadian football

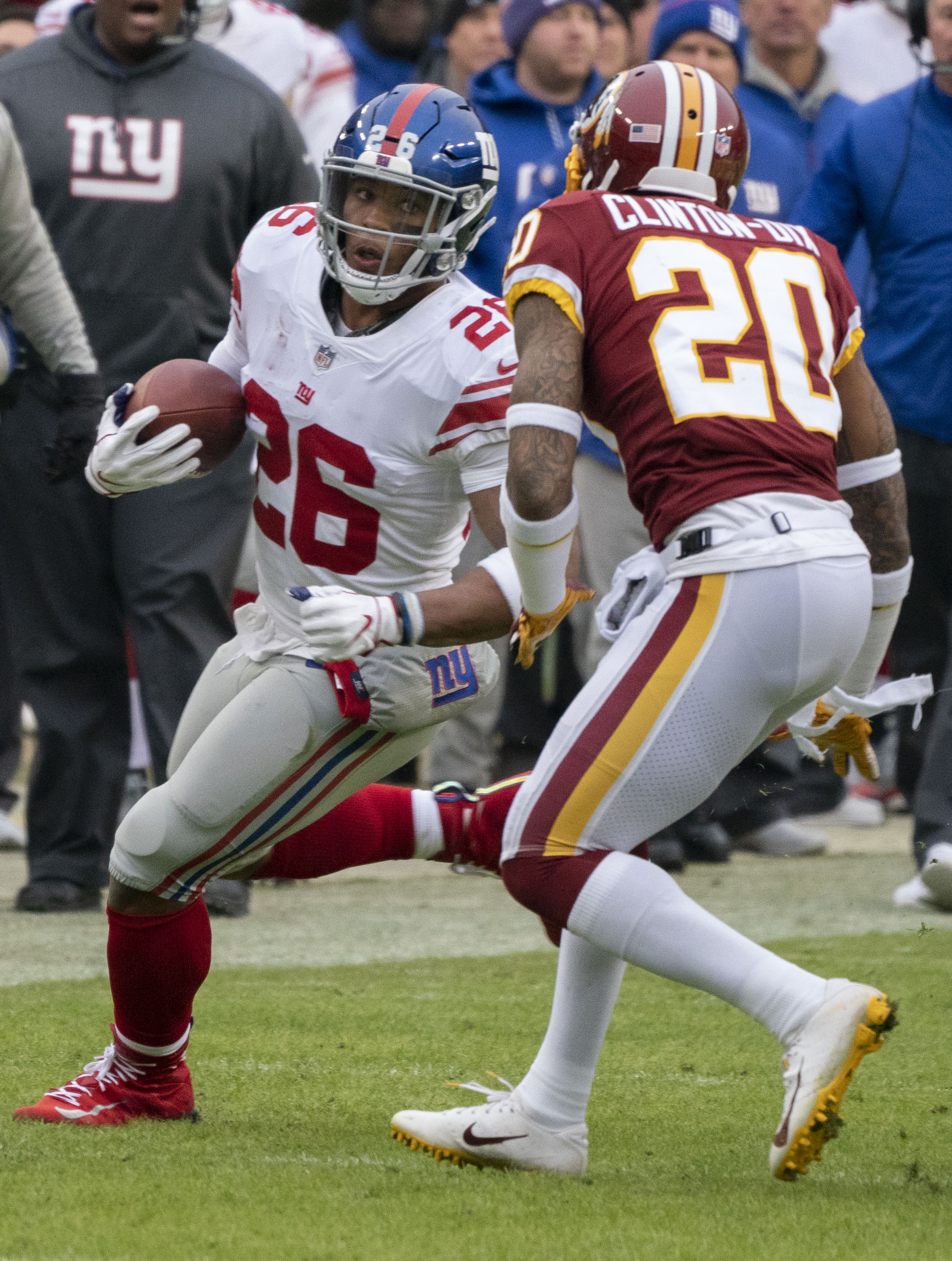
Running back Saquon Barkley against defender Ha Ha Clinton-Dix in December 2018

The running back playing halfback in a typical I formation

A running back (RB) is a member of the offensive backfield in gridiron football. The primary roles of a running back are to receive handoffs from the quarterback to rush the ball, to line up as a receiver to catch the ball, and block. There are usually one or two running backs on the field for a given play, depending on the offensive formation. A running back may be a halfback (in certain contexts also referred to as a "tailback" — see below), a wingback, or a fullback. A running back will sometimes be called a "feature back" if he is the team's key player/more prominent running back.

With the increase in pass-oriented offenses and single set back formations, it is more common to refer to these players as simply running backs.

== Halfback/tailback ==
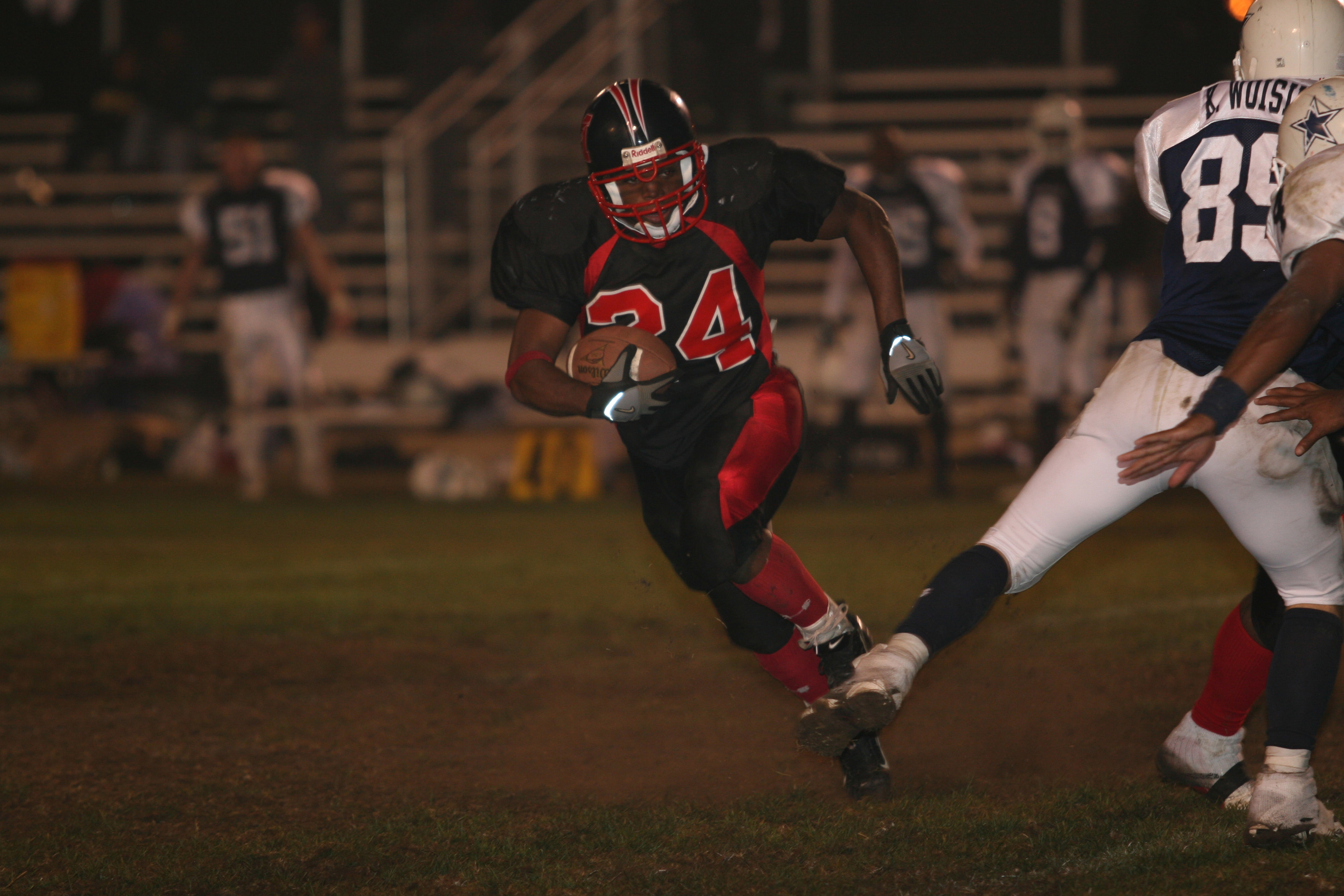
A running back turns up the field in an attempt to reach the end zone

The halfback (HB) or tailback (TB) position is responsible for carrying the ball on the majority of running plays, and may frequently be used as a receiver on short (or sometimes long, depending on the system) passing plays.

In the modern game, an effective halfback must have a blend of both quickness and agility as a runner, as well as sure hands and good vision up-field as a receiver. Quarterbacks depend on halfbacks as a safety valve or checkdown receiver when primary targets downfield are covered or when they are under pressure. Occasionally, halfbacks line up as additional wide receivers.

When not serving either of these functions, the primary responsibility of a halfback is to aid the offensive linemen in blocking, either to protect the quarterback or another player carrying the football. If a team uses a Wildcat formation, often the halfback—instead of the quarterback—is the one who directly receives the snap. As a trick play, running backs are occasionally used to pass the ball on a halfback option play or halfback pass.

The difference between halfback and tailback is the position of the player in the team's offensive formation. In historical formations, the halfback lined up approximately halfway between the line of scrimmage and the fullback (similarly, quarterbacks lined up a quarter of the distance between the line of scrimmage and the fullback). Because the halfback is usually the team's main ball carrier (while the fullback is primarily a blocker), modern offensive formations have positioned the halfback behind the fullback (at the "tail end" of the formation), to take advantage of the fullback's blocking abilities. As a result, some systems or playbooks will call for a tailback as opposed to a halfback.

In Canadian football, the term tailback is often used interchangeably with running back, while the use of the term halfback is often exclusively reserved for the defensive halfback, which refers to the defensive back halfway between the linebackers and the cornerbacks.

== Fullback ==
In most modern college and professional football schemes, fullbacks (FB) carry the ball infrequently, instead using their stronger physiques as primary "lead blockers". On most running plays, the fullback leads the halfback, attempting to block potential tacklers before they reach the ball carrier.

When fullbacks are called upon to carry the ball, the situation typically calls for gaining a short amount of yardage, such as scoring from the goal line, as the fullback can use his bulkiness to avoid being tackled early. While fullbacks do act as an eligible receiver, most plays call for the fullback to remain in the backfield and block any defensive players who make it past the offensive line, a skill referred to as "blitz pickup". Fullbacks are technically running backs, but today the term "running back" is usually used in referring to the halfback or tailback. Although modern fullbacks are rarely used as ball carriers, in previous offensive schemes fullbacks would be the designated ball carriers.

In high school football, where player sizes vary greatly, fullbacks are still frequently used as ball carriers. In high school and college offenses, the triple option scheme uses the fullback as a primary ball carrier. The fullback plays a unique role by establishing an inside running threat on every play. College teams such as Georgia Tech and Air Force have employed the triple option scheme.

While in years past the fullback lined up on the field for almost every offensive play, teams often opt to replace the fullback with an additional wide receiver or a tight end in modern football. Fullbacks in the National Football League today rarely carry or catch the ball, since they are used almost exclusively as blockers. Fullbacks are also still used occasionally as rushers on plays when a short gain is needed for a first-down or touchdown or to surprise the defense since they are usually not expecting a fullback to run or catch the ball. In the past, fullbacks could even be a team's featured back, using their larger size and strength as a "power rusher" to dominate the ground game. Pro Football Hall of Fame members Jim Brown, Marion Motley, Franco Harris, John Riggins, and Larry Csonka were fullbacks.

== Characteristics of a running back ==
=== Height and weight ===
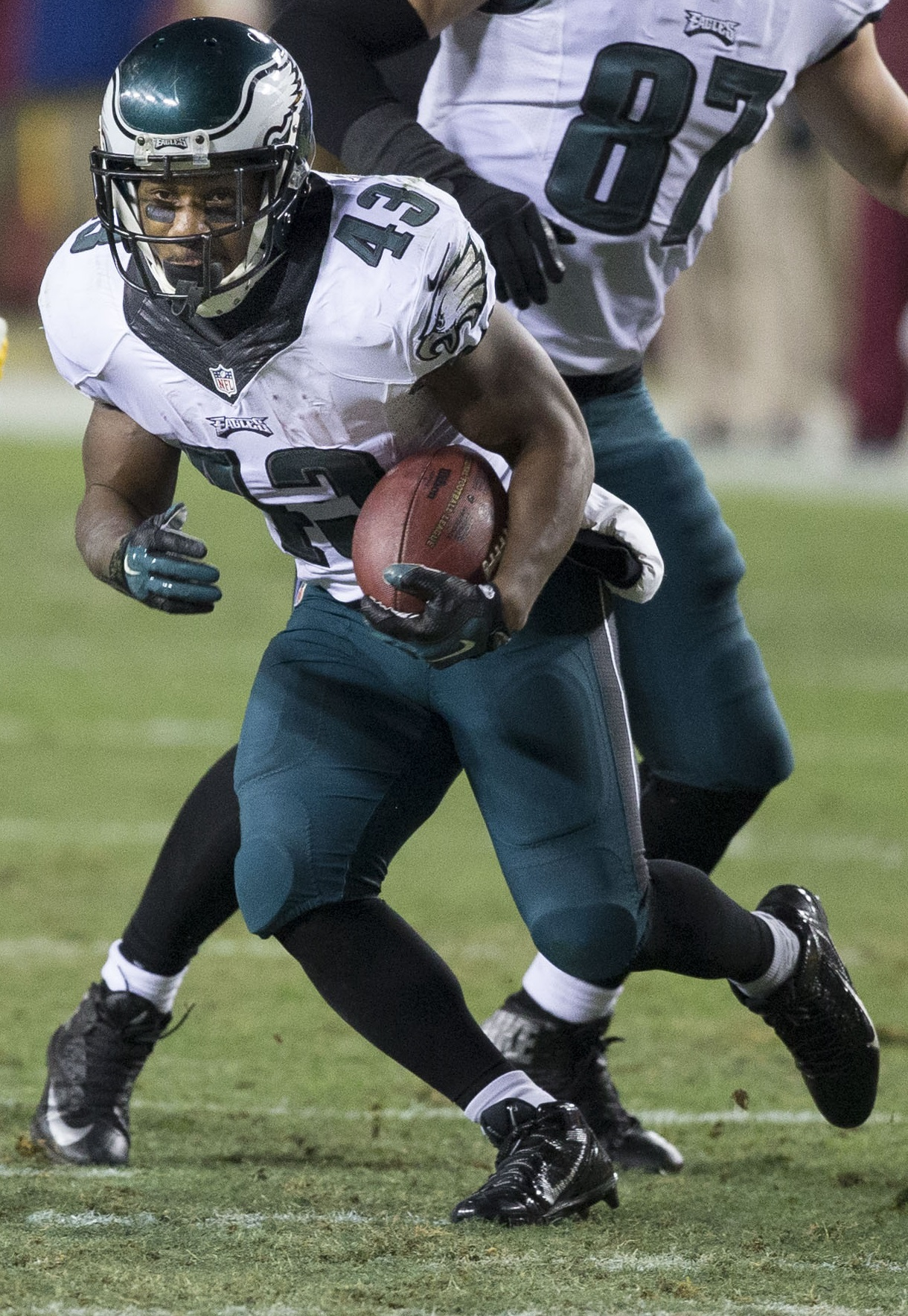
Darren Sproles, a "scat back"

There is a diversity in those who play at the running back position. At one extreme are smaller (5'4"–5'10"), shiftier players. These quick, agile, and elusive running backs are often called "scat backs" because their low center of gravity and maneuverability allow them to dodge tacklers. Running backs known for their elusiveness include Red Grange, Hugh McElhenny, Gale Sayers, and Barry Sanders.

At the other extreme are "power backs", who are bigger and stronger running backs who can break through tackles using brute strength and raw power. They are usually slower runners compared to other backs, and typically run straight ahead (or "North-and-South" in football terminology) rather than dodging to the outside edges of the playing field. Hall of Famers Earl Campbell, Bronko Nagurski, John Riggins, and Larry Csonka, as well as NFL all-time leading rusher Emmitt Smith, were considered power running backs. Mark Ingram II, Carlos Hyde, Nick Chubb, Kareem Hunt, and Leonard Fournette are all examples of current NFL power running backs.

More recently the NFL has turned to running backs who combine those traits such as Todd Gurley, Ezekiel Elliott, Dalvin Cook, and Saquon Barkley.

=== Receiving ability ===
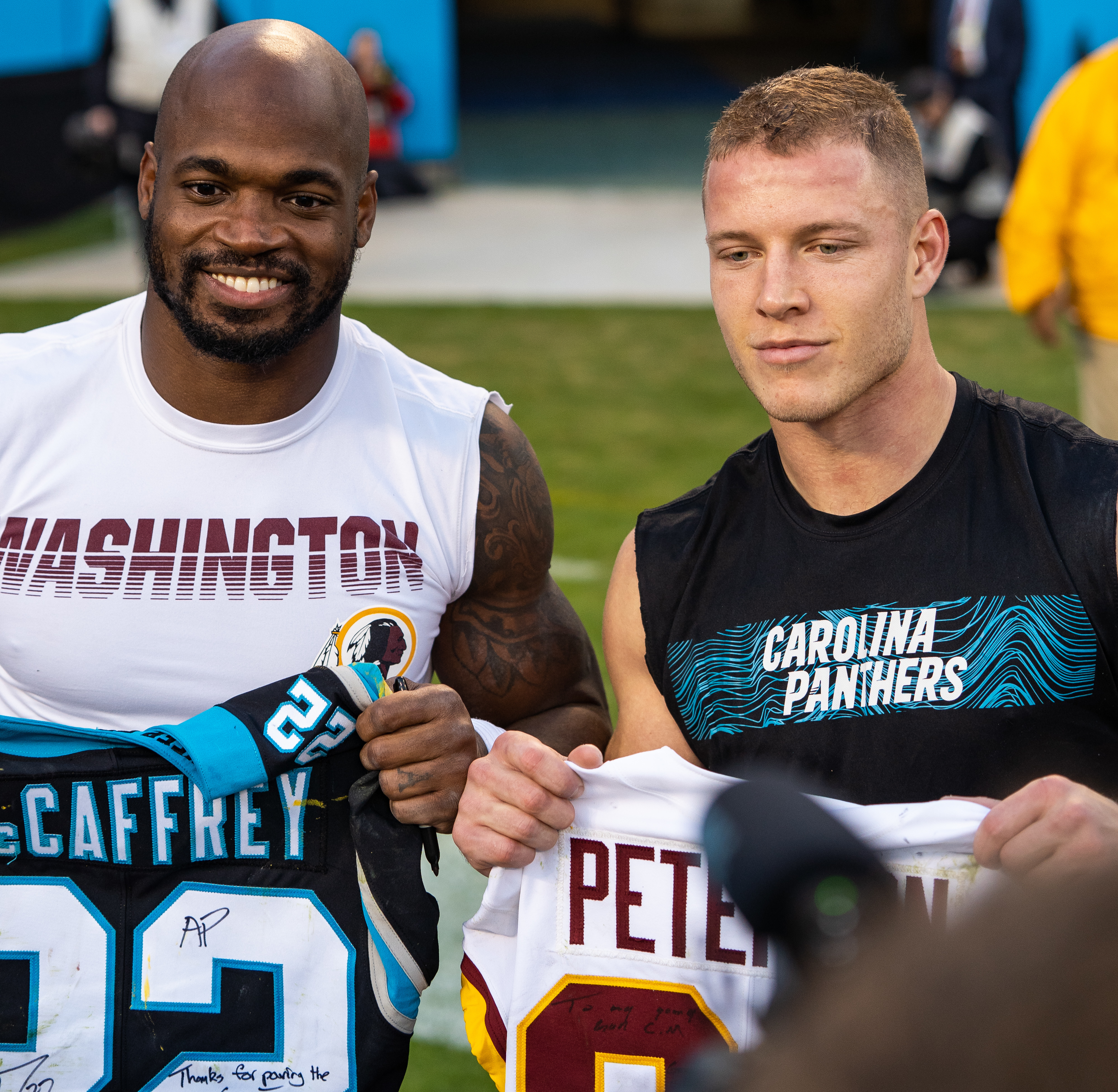
Adrian Peterson (left) and Christian McCaffrey (right), representative of an old school power running and modern receiving running back style, respectively

Over the years, NFL running backs have been used as receivers out of the backfield. On passing plays, a running back will often run a "safe route", such as a hook or a flat route, that gives a quarterback a target when all other receivers are covered or when the quarterback feels pressured. Hall of Famer Lenny Moore was a halfback who played primarily as a pass receiver.

Christian McCaffrey, is one of few players to have 1000 yards rushing and 1000 yards receiving in the same season in 2019. Some teams have a specialist "third down back", who is skilled at catching passes or better at pass blocking and "picking up the blitz", and thus is often put in the game on third down and long. It can also be used to fool the defense by making them think it is being put into the game for a pass play, when the play is actually a run. James White was used as a "third-down back", or as an extra wide receiver. His receiving statistics exceed his rushing statistics, with 3,184 yards and 25 receiving touchdowns on 369 receptions, compared to 1,240 yards and 10 rushing touchdowns on 309 carries.

=== Blocking ===
Running backs are also required to help the offensive line in passing situations, and, in the case of the fullback, running plays. Running backs will regularly block blitzing linebackers or safeties on passing plays when the offensive line is occupied with the defensive linemen. On running plays, the fullback will often attempt to create a hole in the offensive line for the running back to run through. Effective blocking backs are usually key components for a running back's success. On passing plays, a running back will stay back to help block and pick up the blitz

=== Goal line backs ===
Many teams also have a running back designated as a "goal line back" or "short yardage specialist". This running back comes into the game in short yardage situations when the offense needs only a little bit of yardage to get a first down or a touchdown. Normally, when an offense gets inside the 5-yard line it sends in its goal line formation, which usually includes eight blockers, a quarterback, a running back, and a fullback. The closer it is to the goal line, the more likely it is to use this formation. If a certain running back is used often near the goal line, he may be called the "goal line back." Short yardage and goal line backs often are power backs who are not prone to fumbling, who muscle through or push a large mass of defenders to get the first down or touchdown.

=== As kick and punt returners ===
Running backs are sometimes called upon to return punts and kickoffs, a role usually filled by wide receivers and cornerbacks, who are generally among the fastest players on the team. A running back, Brian Mitchell, currently holds the NFL records for career kickoff return yards (14,014 yards) and career punt return yards (4,999 yards).

== Value of running backs in the NFL ==
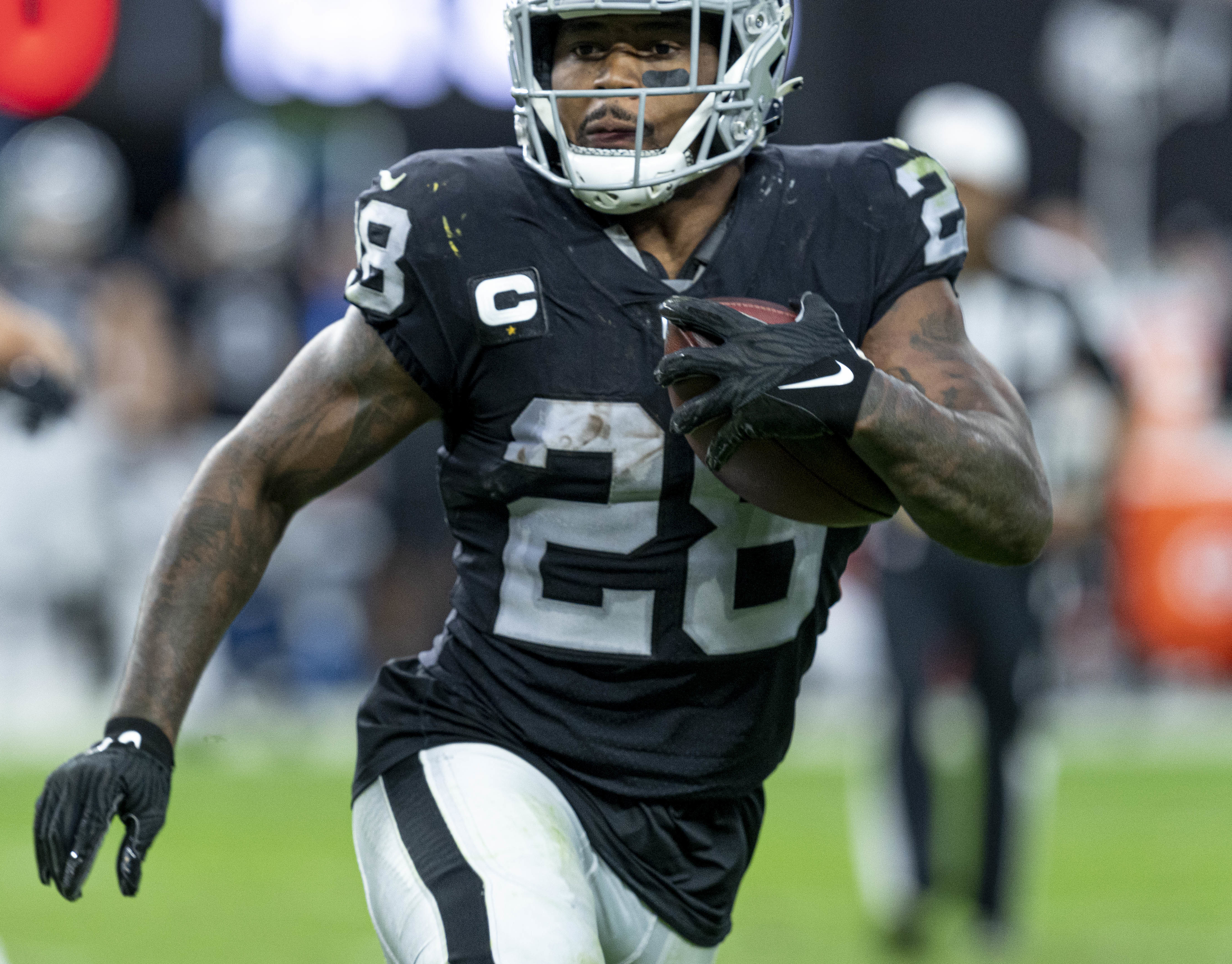
Josh Jacobs of the Las Vegas Raiders, playing against the Washington Commanders at Allegiant Stadium on December 5, 2021. Jacobs led the NFL in rushing yards in 2022.

In previous decades, the running back position was considered to be one of the more important skill positions in the NFL. In fact, as recently as the 1990s, the running back position was considered by some to be as important as, if not more important than, the quarterback position. For example, in the history of the NFL draft, 23 running backs have been selected with the first overall pick, the most recent of these being Ki-Jana Carter in 1995. However, in the modern NFL, teams currently value running backs significantly less than they did in previous decades.

=== Usage of analytics ===
There are several possible explanations for the aforementioned shift in how teams have valued running backs. A common explanation for the shift is that teams have incorporated analytics into team-building. The analytics community has often considered the running back position to be the least important and most replaceable of any position in football. These analysts have defended this argument by noting that running back production is heavily dependent on offensive line play and offensive scheming rather than the ball carrier himself. Additionally, these analysts have noted that running back talent is replicable by citing that backups and mid-to-late round backs have often matched and sometimes exceeded the production of starting running backs or first-round backs. For example, in every season from 2019 to 2022, Dallas Cowboys backup running back Tony Pollard, a 2019 fourth-round selection, averaged more yards per carry than Dallas's starting running back, Ezekiel Elliott, who was selected in the first round of the 2016 NFL draft. Furthermore, in 2022, star running back and 2017 first-round selection Christian McCaffrey, who began the season as the feature back for the Carolina Panthers, averaged 4.7 yards per carry in the team's first six games of the season. After Carolina traded McCaffrey to the San Francisco 49ers before Week 7, running backs D'Onta Foreman and Chuba Hubbard, who were selected in the third round in 2017 and the fourth round in 2021, respectively, took over backfield duties for the Panthers. Foreman averaged 4.6 yards per carry as a Panther in 2022, which was similar to what McCaffrey averaged as a Panther that season. Meanwhile, Hubbard averaged 4.9 yards per carry as a Panther in 2022, which exceeded McCaffrey's average yards per carry as a Panther that season. In other cases, the starting quarterback is a central component of the rushing attack. The Baltimore Ravens and Philadelphia Eagles had operated like this between the mid-2010s and early 2020s, though both teams made major free agent signings at running back in 2024 with Derrick Henry and Saquon Barkley respectively.

Analytics departments have also argued that offenses are more successful if they pass the ball more often. Passing plays have consistently averaged more yards than running plays in recent NFL history. Such analysts have argued that this is the case because during running plays, the defensive linemen, linebacking corps, and secondary all have a chance to tackle the ball carrier, but on passing plays, it is possible to effectively eliminate the defensive linemen, linebacking corps, and even the secondary from stopping the play. Furthermore, on passing plays, it is easier to gain additional yards when the ball is delivered to a receiver in open space, but it is not as easy for a running back to make defenders miss. This is especially the case when a running play is designed for the back to run between the tackles, and thus, through the teeth of the defense. Some analysts believe that running the ball is simply a complement to the passing game and will rarely win a team games. These analytical arguments may have also played a role in the NFL's transition from a run-heavy to pass-happy offensive attack.

Because analytics have hinted at what it takes for rushing attacks to thrive, the widespread availability of productive and inexpensive running backs, and the efficiency of the passing offense, they may have served as the impetus for teams' transition to a passing offense and declining need for and valuation of traditional feature running backs.

=== The rise of running back committees ===
Another possible cause for the devaluation of running backs are the rise of running back committees. This is the practice of constructing a roster that has more than one featured running back. As of the 2023 NFL season, there are a number of running back committee setups present around the league, with the most common being the "70-30 rotation", a setup which has a featured running back taking the majority of the snaps while one or more change of pace backs make up the rest. Other setups include the "tandem backfields", which are setups that have two featured running backs splitting carriers, often with two different running styles, i.e. a power running back partnered with an elusive back or pass-catching back. One of the most famous of these setups was the tandem duo of Ricky Williams and Ronnie Brown as part of the 2008 Miami Dolphins. The last of these setups are "full-blown" committees, which often feature 3 or more running backs that are often cycled through throughout a game, with coaches often sticking to whomever is "hot" as the main running back. The running back by committee style has been popularized across the league because of how injury prone the position is and the effects of fatigue on players. Because of how successful this style of offense has been, the traditional "workhorse" back has become significantly less common.

Despite the rise of committees, "workhorse" running backs are still present, with a recent and prominent example being Derrick Henry of the Tennessee Titans, who, during the 2022 season, took nearly 90% of all of the Titans' carries that season.

=== Long-term running back contracts ===
Another possible explanation for the declining value NFL teams place on running backs is the risk of signing one to a lucrative, long-term deal. There are several examples of such contracts given to running backs that have backfired on teams. Most notably, before the 2018 NFL season, Los Angeles Rams star feature back Todd Gurley signed a 4-year extension for $60 million with $45 million in guaranteed money. The deal made him the highest-paid running back in the NFL at the time. Although Gurley turned in another strong season in 2018 in which he led the league in rushing touchdowns and made a third Pro Bowl, an arthritis diagnosis hampered him during the 2018 Rams' playoff run and in the 2019 NFL season. This led to the Rams releasing him after the conclusion of the 2019 season, meaning that Gurley did not play a down as a Ram for the time period that the team extended him for. Despite owing Gurley, who ended his playing career after the 2020 NFL season, a dead cap hit of $8.4 million for the 2021 NFL season, the Rams won that season's Super Bowl LVI with an offense that ranked 24th in rushing but 5th in passing. The 2021 Rams opted to utilize a running back by committee approach and instead put greater focus on the passing attack.

On the other hand, several successful teams have survived without distributing significant financial capital towards running backs. In addition to the 2021 Los Angeles Rams, who won Super Bowl LVI in spite of the Gurley contract, the 2022 Kansas City Chiefs won Super Bowl LVII with an offense that finished 20th in rushing but 1st in passing. Seventh-round rookie running back Isiah Pacheco (who overtook the starting job from 2020 first-round selection Clyde Edwards-Helaire due to the latter's injuries and suboptimal production) was Kansas City's primary back during the team's Super Bowl run. Out of the last 14 Super Bowl winners, only five of those teams paid their top rusher a base salary over $1 million, and only one of those five paid its top rusher a base salary of over $2 million, thus proving that a highly paid running back is not essential for winning.

Other examples of lucrative, long-term contracts given to running backs that backfired on teams include those given to Le'Veon Bell (4-year contract for $52.5 million, cut during year 2 of contract), Ezekiel Elliott (6-year extension for $90 million, cut after year 2 of extension), and David Johnson (3-year extension for $39 million, traded after year 1 of extension).

=== Draft value ===
Although drafting running backs in the first round of the NFL draft was commonplace throughout the 20th century, doing such is less commonplace and frequently criticized in the current era of NFL football. As previously mentioned, 23 running backs have been selected with the first overall pick in the history of the NFL Draft, but no running back has been selected first overall since 1995. However, football analytics departments view running back talent as replicable and thus believe that productive running backs can be drafted in the later rounds of the draft or signed to low-risk deals in free agency. For that reason, in recent years, teams with desires for a stronger rushing attack have passed on running backs during the first round and instead used those top draft picks on other needs or other positions that (according to analytics) are actually more responsible for rushing success, such as offensive linemen.

As teams have become more analytically inclined, they have not used their first round draft picks on running backs nearly as much as they used to. For example, from 1981 to 1985, more than half of all lead running backs were selected in the first round of the draft, but from 2016 to the present, that figure dipped to just over a quarter of all lead running backs. In fact, during the 2022 NFL draft, not a single running back was selected in the first round. The following year, when the Atlanta Falcons used the eighth overall pick to select running back Bijan Robinson, several analysts heavily criticized the Falcons and argued that they could have used the pick to fulfill another need and selected a productive running back in the later rounds. The Detroit Lions faced similar backlash for taking running back Jahmyr Gibbs with the twelfth overall pick in the 2023 NFL draft. Gibbs was considered a questionable pick because analysts felt that the pick could have been put to better use even with the known talent that Gibbs offered.

Despite the widespread criticism of drafting running backs in the first round, some observers have defended the practice if done in the right circumstances. For example, some writers defended the selection of Robinson in the first round due to his versatility and contributions to the passing attack while he was in college.

=== Consequences of evolving team-building approaches on running backs ===
Because teams have changed how they view the running back position, running back contracts have declined in value. For example, as of 2023, the average running back makes $1.808 million per season, which is less than what the average kicker makes ($2.196 million per season). Also, the franchise tag for running backs has decreased from $10.95 million in 2015 to $10.09 million in 2023. In fact, the running back position is the only position to see a decline in franchise tag value since 2015. Furthermore, in 2023, the franchise tag for running backs was the least valuable of franchise tags for any offensive or defensive position.

In recent years, NFL teams have shown that they are willing to move on from productive running backs once they are due for a big payday and instead replicate their production by taking advantage of cheaper alternatives such as their own backups, mid to late round draft picks, and low-risk free agent running backs. For example, during the 2023 NFL offseason, feature running backs Dalvin Cook, Ezekiel Elliott, Leonard Fournette, and Kareem Hunt, despite enjoying productive careers up to that point, were either released by the respective teams that they previously played for or allowed to leave during free agency. As of July 18, 2023 (the beginning of training camp for several NFL teams), the four aforementioned unemployed running backs have remained as such. Other productive running backs such as Las Vegas Raiders starting running back Josh Jacobs, New York Giants starting running back Saquon Barkley, and Dallas Cowboys backup running back Tony Pollard were franchise tagged by their respective teams during the 2023 offseason. The three aforementioned backs failed to agree to a long-term deal by the July 17 deadline. As of July 18, 2023, only Pollard has signed his franchise tender, while Barkley and Jacobs have yet to sign their tenders (Barkley would later agree to a separate one-year deal worth up to $11 million with the Giants on July 25, and Jacobs would later agree to a separate one-year deal worth up to $12 million with the Raiders on August 26). In other cases, productive running backs have accepted pay cuts due to a lack of leverage and/or the desire to contribute to teams. For example, Cincinnati Bengals feature back Joe Mixon took a pay cut before the 2023 season despite boasting a productive career resume to that point.

Due to the decline in value of running back contracts and the prolonged periods in which previously productive running backs (e.g. Elliott, Cook, Hunt, and Fournette) have remained unemployed, several running backs, such as Tennessee Titans running back Derrick Henry, have spoken out about the state of the running back market in 2023 and complained that running backs have not been provided with fair compensation for the services they provide.

== See also ==
- List of NFL annual rushing yards leaders
- List of NFL annual rushing touchdowns leaders
- List of NFL career rushing yards leaders
- List of NFL career rushing touchdowns leaders
- List of NCAA major college football yearly rushing leaders
- NCAA Division I FBS rushing leaders
