= American football positions =

Specific roles that players take in American football

A diagram showing an I formation on offense and a 4–3 formation on defense

In American football, the specific role that a player takes on the field is referred to as their position. Under the modern rules of American football, both teams are allowed 11 players on the field at one time and have "unlimited free substitutions", meaning that they may change any number of players during any dead ball situation. (Note: A "dead ball" occurs after the officials have blown the whistle ending the previous play, and before they have signaled the ball is ready for the start of the next play.) This has resulted in the development of three task-specific "platoons" of players within any single team: the offense (the team with possession of the ball, which is trying to score), the defense (the team trying to prevent the other team from scoring, and to take the ball from them), and special teams, who play in all kicking situations. Within these three separate platoons, various positions exist depending on the jobs that the players are doing.

== Offense ==
In American football, the offense is the team that has possession of the ball and is advancing toward the opponent's end zone to score points. The eleven players of the offense can be separated into two main groups: the five offensive linemen, whose primary job is to block opponents and protect their quarterback, and the other five backs and receivers, whose primary job is to move the ball down the field by either running with it or passing it.

The rules of the sport strictly mandate the organization of the offense: there must be at least seven players on the line of scrimmage and no more than four players, known collectively as backs, behind it. The only players eligible to handle the ball during a normal play are the backs and the two players on the ends of the line, known as the ends. These players make up the skill positions and are also referred to as eligible receivers or eligible ball carriers. The remaining players, known as interior linemen, are ineligible to catch forward passes. Within these structures, however, creative coaches have developed a wide array of offensive formations to take advantage of different player skills and game situations.

The following positions are standard in nearly every game, though different teams will use different arrangements of them, depending on their individual game plans.

=== Offensive line (OL) ===
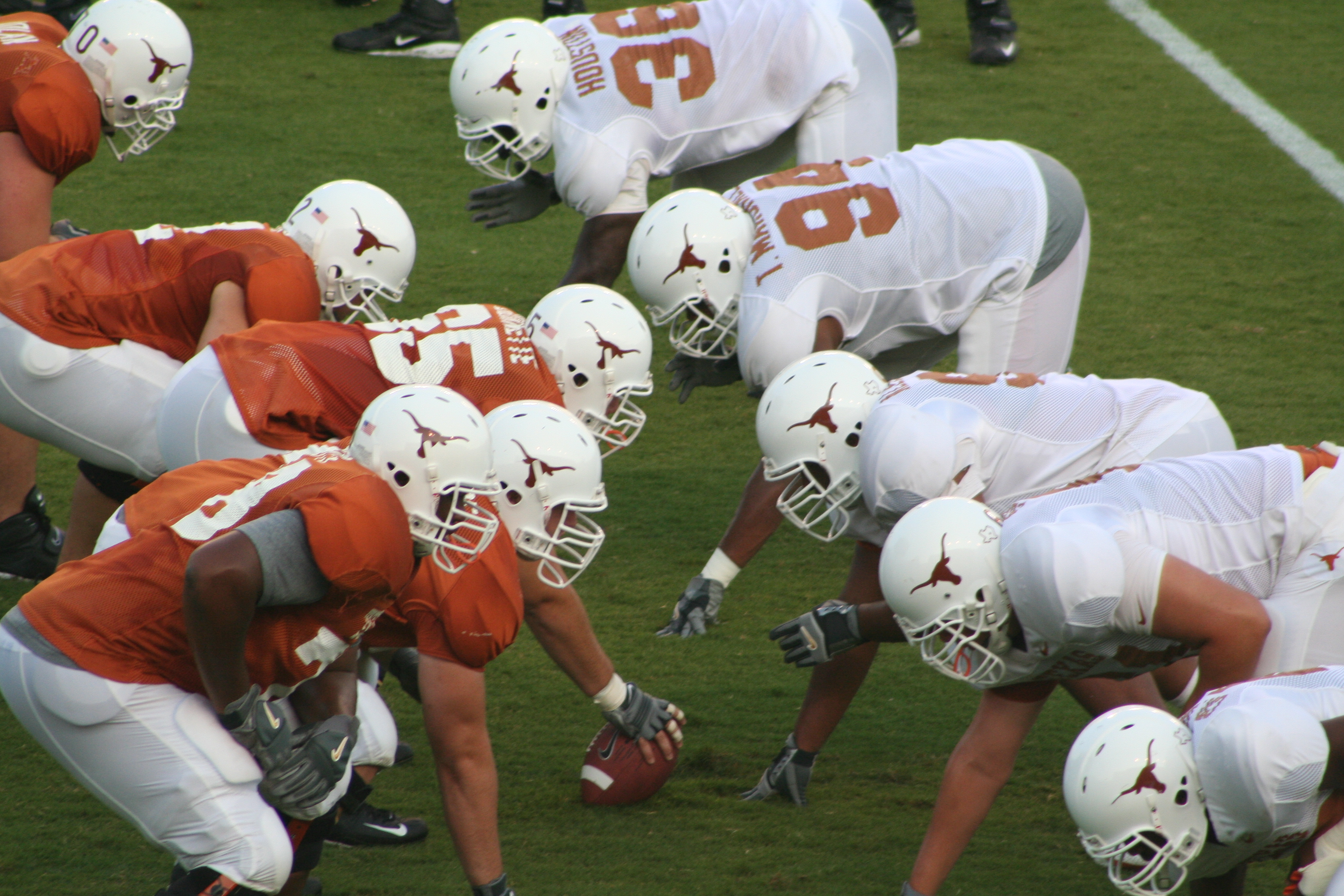
The offensive line (on left, in orange jerseys) consists of a center (with ball in hand ready to snap) with two guards on either side, and two tackles

The offensive line is primarily responsible for blocking the defensive line of the opposition to protect their own quarterback. During normal play, offensive linemen do not handle the ball (aside from the snap from center) unless the ball is fumbled by a ball carrier, a pass is deflected, or a player who is normally an offensive lineman takes a different position on the field. The offensive line consists of:

==== Center (C) ====
The center is the player who begins the play from scrimmage by snapping the ball to the quarterback. As the name suggests, the center usually plays in the middle of the offensive line, though some teams may employ an unbalanced line where the center is offset to one side. Like all offensive linemen, the center has the responsibility to block defensive players. The center often also has the responsibility to call out blocking assignments and make last-second adjustments depending on the defensive alignment.

==== Offensive guard (OG) ====
Two guards line up directly on opposite sides of the center. Like all interior linemen, their function is to block on both running and passing plays. On some plays, rather than blocking straight ahead, a guard will pull, during which the guard comes out of their position in line to lead block for a ball carrier, on plays known as traps (for inside runs), sweeps for outside runs, and screens for passing plays. In such cases, the guard is referred to as a pulling guard.

==== Offensive tackle (OT) ====
Two tackles play outside of the guards. Their role is primarily to block on both running and passing plays. The area from one tackle to the other is an area of close line play in which blocks from behind, which are prohibited elsewhere on the field, are allowed. For a right-handed quarterback, the left tackle is charged with protecting the quarterback from being hit from behind, known as the blind side, and this is usually the most skilled player on the offensive line. Like a guard, the tackle may have to pull on a running play when there is a tight end on their side. Tackles typically have a taller, longer build than interior offensive linemen, due to the need to keep separation from defensive linemen in pass blocking situations. They also tend to have quick footwork skills, often engaging against containing or rushing defensive ends.

=== Skill positions ===
Offensive positions that handle the ball and are primarily responsible for advancing yards and scoring points are known as the skill positions. They include quarterbacks, backs, wide receivers, and tight ends.

==== Quarterback (QB) ====
The quarterback is the player who receives the ball from the center to start the play. Considered the most influential position on the offensive side because his team's progress down the field is dependent on his success, the quarterback is responsible for receiving the play from the coaches on the sideline and communicating the play to the other offensive players in the huddle, and serves as the leader of the team's passing game. The quarterback may need to make late changes to the intended play at the line of scrimmage, known as an audible, depending on the defensive alignment. At the start of the play, the quarterback may be lined up in one of three positions. If they are positioned directly behind and in contact with the center and receive the ball via the direct hand-to-hand pass, they are said to be "under center". Alternatively, if they are lined up some distance behind the center, they are said to be either in shotgun formation or in pistol formation, with shotgun generally further back than pistol. Upon receiving the ball from the center, the quarterback has three basic options to advance the ball: they may run the ball themself (commonly referred to as scrambling), hand it to another eligible ball carrier to run with it, or execute a forward pass to a player further up the field.

==== Backs (RB/FB) ====
Running backs are players who line up behind the offensive line in a position to receive a hand-off from the quarterback and execute a rushing play. Anywhere from zero to three running backs may be utilized on a play; a formation with no running backs is often called an empty backfield. Depending on where they line up and what role they have, running backs come in several varieties. The tailback, also known as the halfback, is often a team's primary ball carrier on rushing plays. They may also catch passes, often acting as a check-down or safety valve when all other receivers on a pass play are covered. A wing-back or a slot-back is a term for a running back who lines up behind the line of scrimmage outside the tackle or tight end on either side of the offensive line. Slot-backs are usually only found in certain offensive alignments, such as the flexbone formation. There also exists a similar position, known as the H-back, which is actually considered a modification of the normal tight end position.

The fullback is often larger and stronger than the tailback and acts primarily as a blocker, though the fullback may also be used for catching passes or for rushing as a tailback does. Fullbacks often line up closer to the line of scrimmage than tailbacks do to block for them on rushing plays.

==== Wide receiver (WR) ====
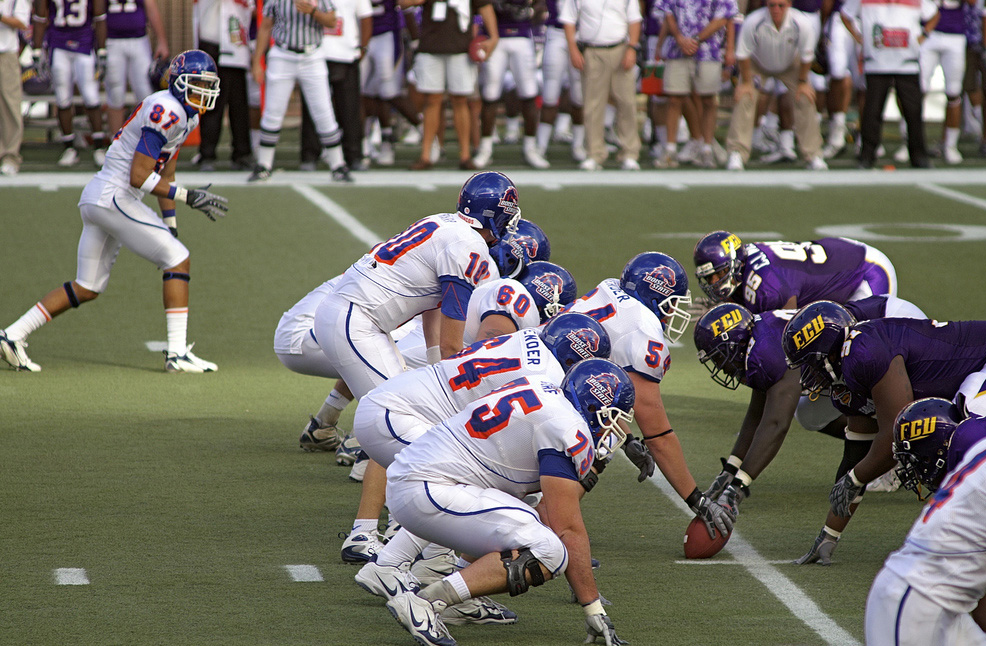
A wide receiver (No. 87, in white) begins a play in the flanker position

Wide receivers are pass-catching specialists. Typically fast and tall, their main job is to run pass routes and get open (i.e, find a position with no nearby defender) for passes, although they are occasionally utilized as blockers. Wide receivers generally line up split wide near the sidelines at the start of the play. Wide receivers, like running backs, come in different varieties depending on exactly where they line up. A wide receiver who is directly on the line of scrimmage is called a split end and is counted among the seven required players on the line of scrimmage. A wide receiver who lines up behind the line and counts as one of the four backs is called the flanker. A wide receiver who lines up between the outermost wide receiver and the offensive line is said to be in the slot and is called the slot receiver. A wide receiver who can play running back is called a wide back.

==== Tight end (TE) ====
Tight ends play on either side of the offensive line and directly next to the tackles. Tight ends are considered hybrid players because they are a cross between a wide receiver and an offensive lineman. Because they play next to the other offensive linemen, they are very frequently called on to block, especially on run plays. However, because they are eligible receivers, they may also catch passes. The position known as the H-back is a tight end who lines up behind the line of scrimmage, and is thus counted as one of the four backs, but their role is otherwise similar to that of other tight ends.

Depending on the style of offense the coaches have designed, the game situation, and the relative skill sets of the players, teams may run formations that contain any number of running backs, wide receivers, and tight ends, so long as the mandated four backs and seven on the line rule is followed. For many years, the standard set consisted of the quarterback, two running backs (a tailback/halfback and a fullback), two wide receivers (a flanker and a split end), and a tight end. Modern teams show a wide variety of formations, from a full house formation with three running backs, two tight ends, and no wide receivers, to spread formations featuring four or five wide receivers and either one or no running backs.

== Defense ==
The defensive team, simply known as the defense, is the team that begins a play from scrimmage without possession of the ball. The objective of the defensive team is to prevent the other team from scoring and win possession of the ball for their side. The defense accomplishes this by forcing the offense to turn the ball over by either preventing them from achieving a first down and forcing them to punt, forcing and recovering an offensive fumble, intercepting a pass, or more rarely, forcing a turnover on downs.

Unlike the offensive team, the rules of the sport do not restrict the defensive team to certain positions. A defensive player may line up anywhere on his side of the line of scrimmage and perform any legal action. Over time, however, defensive roles have become defined into three main sets of players that encompass several individual positions.

Defensive formations are often known by a numerical code indicating the number of players at each position. The two most common formations are the 3–4 defense and the 4–3 defense, where the first number refers to the number of defensive linemen, and the second number refers to the number of linebackers (the number of defensive backs can be inferred, since there must be eleven players on the field). Thus, a 3–4 defense consists of three defensive linemen (usually a nose tackle and two defensive ends), four linebackers, and four defensive backs (two cornerbacks, a strong safety, and a free safety). Some defensive formations will directly indicate the number of defensive backs. The 3–3–5 defense, for instance, has 3 defensive linemen, 3 linebackers, and 5 defensive backs.

=== Defensive line (DL) ===
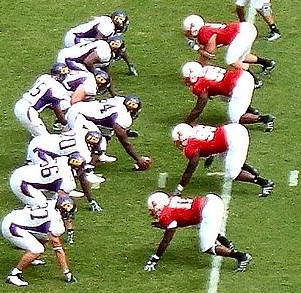
The four defensive linemen (in red) have their hands on the ground in a three-point stance.

Like their offensive counterparts, defensive linemen (also called rushers) line up directly on the line of scrimmage. There are three positions usually considered part of the defensive line:

==== Defensive tackle (DT) ====
Sometimes called a defensive guard, defensive tackles play at the center of the defensive line. Their function is to rush the passer and stop running plays directed at the middle of the line of scrimmage. Most defensive sets have one or two defensive tackles. If one employs a second defensive tackle, sometimes referred to as an under tackle, they are usually a bit faster than the nose tackle.

==== Nose tackle (NT) ====
Sometimes called a middle guard or nose guard, nose tackles play in the center of the defensive line. Their function is to clog the middle of the offensive line and stop most run plays (most commonly fullback dives, plunges, and sneaks). They line up directly in front of the offense's center, almost nose-to-nose, hence the name. This position is used in 3-4 formations or goal-line situations.

Most nose tackles are 320-350 pounds, and are the biggest players on the roster. This position is the most physically demanding, as players are often forced into constant double or triple teams and need enough speed to collapse the interior of the offensive line. Sometimes, nose tackles are used in 4-3 defenses and are either positioned on the quarterback's blind side or directly in front of the center.

==== Defensive end (DE) ====
Defensive ends line up outside of the defensive tackles and are the ends of the defensive line. Their function is to attack the passer or stop offensive runs to the outer edges of the line of scrimmage, which is often referred to as containment. The faster of the two is usually placed on the right side of the defensive line (quarterback's left) because that is the right-handed quarterback's blind side.

Defensive linemen will often take a stance with one or both of their hands on the ground before the ball is snapped. These are known as a three-point stance and four-point stance, respectively, and this helps distinguish a defensive lineman from a linebacker, who begins in a two-point stance (i.e., without a hand touching the ground).

=== Linebackers (LB) ===
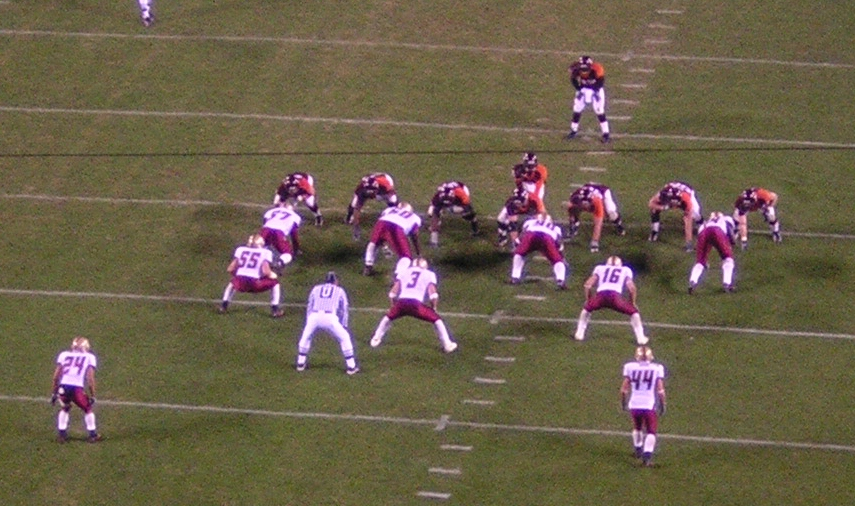
This defense (in white) is in a base 4–3 set. Just behind the four defensive linemen (whose hands are on the ground) are three linebackers (numbers 55, 3, and 16), and further back are two safeties (numbers 24 and 44). The two cornerbacks are off-screen to the left and right.

Linebackers play behind the defensive line and perform various duties depending on the situation, including rushing the passer, covering receivers, and defending against the run.

==== Middle linebacker (MLB) ====
Sometimes called the inside linebacker, especially in a 3–4 defense, and known colloquially as the Mike linebacker, the middle linebacker is often known as the quarterback of the defense, since they are frequently the primary defensive play callers and must react to a wide variety of situations. Middle linebackers must be capable of stopping running backs who make it past the defensive line, covering pass plays over the middle, and rushing the quarterback on blitz plays.

==== Outside linebacker (OLB) ====
An outside linebacker is a versatile "hybrid" athlete who plays on the edges of the defense to stop the offense from moving outside. Their first job is to "set the edge," acting like a wall that forces the runner back toward the middle of the field. On passing plays, they either blitz the quarterback to get a sack or drop back into space to guard receivers like tight ends. Because they have to be strong enough to hit and fast enough to run, they are basically the "Swiss Army Knife" of the football team.

=== Defensive backs (DB) ===
Defensive backs, also known as the secondary, play either behind the linebackers or outside near the sidelines and are primarily used to defend against pass plays. They also act as the last line of defense on running plays and need to be able to make open field tackles, especially when the ball carrier has gotten past the other defenders. A normal defensive lineup includes two cornerbacks and two safeties. However, specialty defensive backs (nickelbacks and dime backs) can be brought in in place of linebackers and defensive linemen when there is a need to cover additional receivers.

==== Cornerback (CB) ====
Cornerbacks attempt to prevent successful passes by either swatting the airborne ball away from the receiver or by catching the pass themselves. In rushing situations, their job is to contain the runner, either by directing them back to the middle of the field to be tackled by the middle line backers or by forcing them out of bounds.

==== Nickelback / dimeback ====
In certain formations, the defense may remove a linebacker or a defensive lineman to bring in extra pass coverage in the form of extra defensive backs. A formation with five defensive backs is often called a nickel formation, and the fifth (extra) defensive back is called a nickelback after the U.S. nickel coin, a five-cent piece. By extension, a formation with a sixth defensive back, known as the dimeback, is called a dime package because it employs a second nickelback and the U.S. 10-cent dime coin is equal to two nickels. Although it is a rare occurrence, a team may also use seven or eight defensive backs on a play.

==== Safety (S) ====
The safeties are the last line of defense (farthest from the line of scrimmage) and usually help the corners with deep-pass coverage. The strong safety (SS) is traditionally the larger and stronger of the two, providing extra protection against run plays by standing closer to the line of scrimmage, usually on the strong (tight end) side of the field. The free safety (FS) is often the smaller and faster of the two, and is typically the deepest player on the defense, providing help on long pass plays.

== Special teams ==
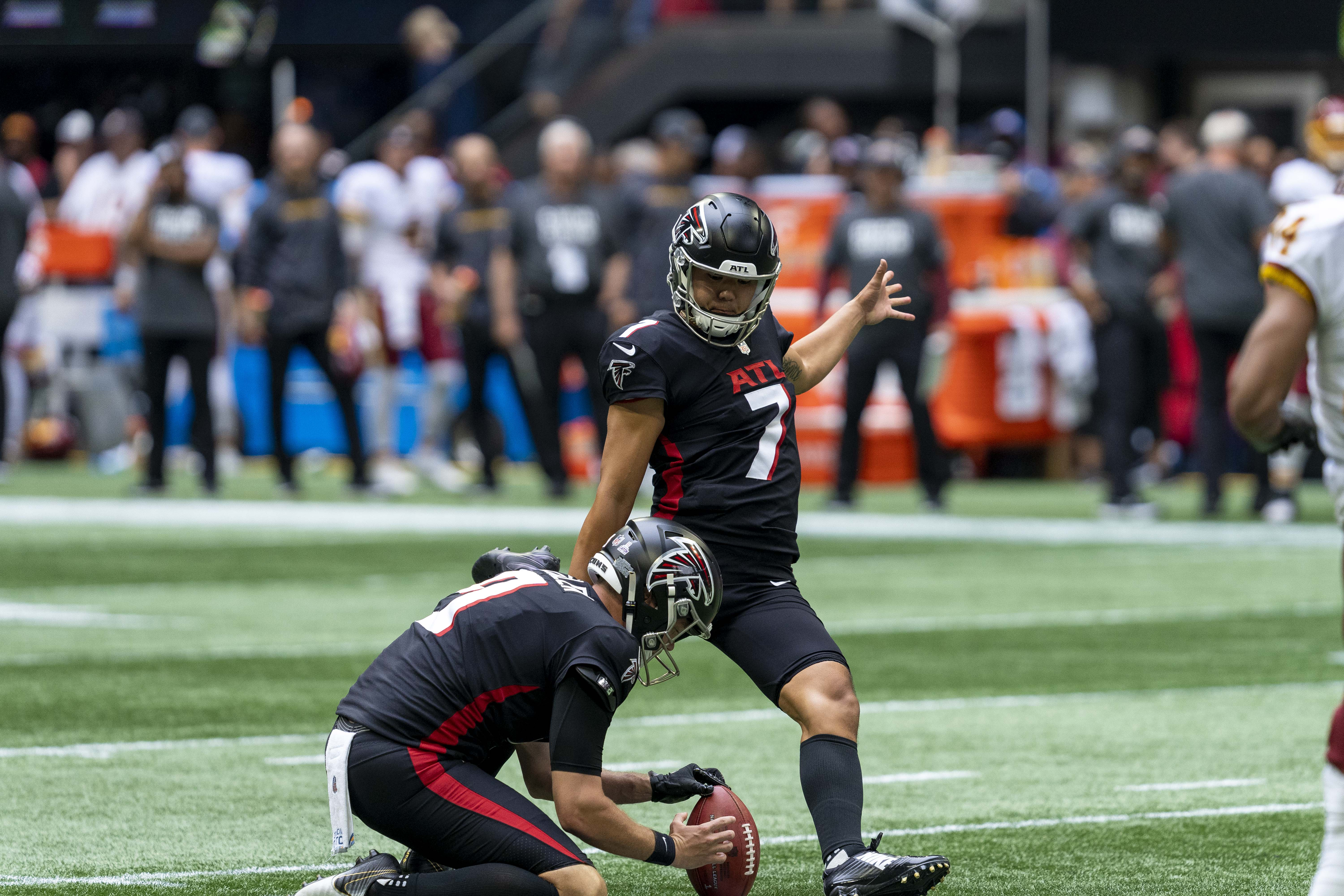
A placekicker, Younghoe Koo (No. 7) with the Atlanta Falcons, prepares to kick the ball from the hand of a holder (Cameron Nizialek, No. 9).

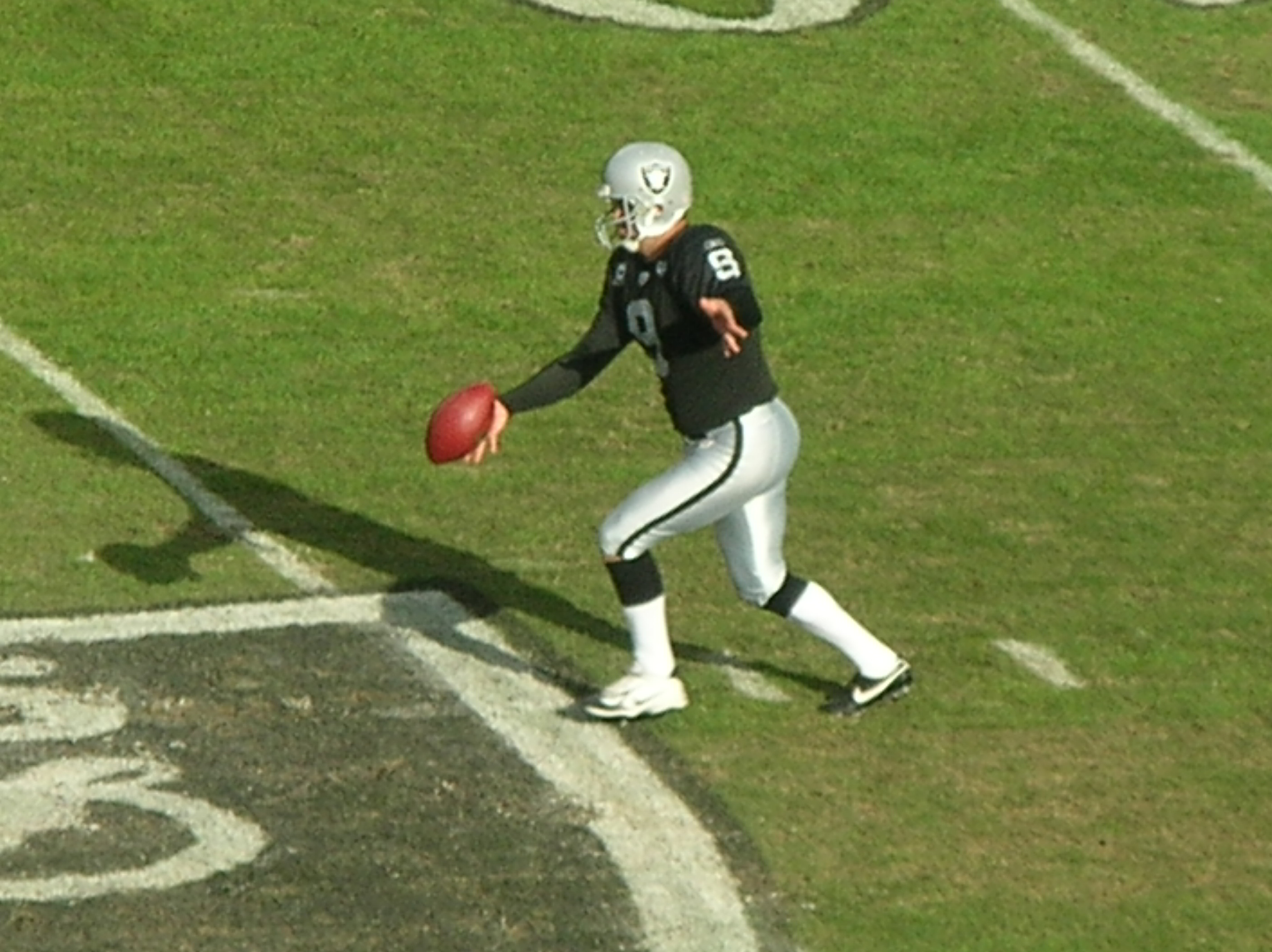
Shane Lechler of the Oakland Raiders punting the ball, 2008

Special teams are units that are on the field during kicking plays. While many players who appear on offensive or defensive squads also play similar roles on special teams (offensive linemen to block or defensive players to tackle), some specialist roles are unique to the kicking game.

=== Placekicker (K) ===
Placekickers, colloquially called simply a kicker, handle kickoffs, extra points, and field goals. All three situations require the kicker to kick the ball off the ground, either from the hands of a holder or off a tee. Some teams employ two kickers: one kicks extra points and field goals. Most, however, use a single kicker for both jobs, and rarely, the same player may also punt.

Kickoff specialists are kickers used exclusively on kickoffs. In most cases, the team's regular kicker or punter performs the role. Teams may employ pure kickoff specialists if they feel neither are good enough at kickoffs. Due to their specialized nature and the limited number of active roster spots, kickoff specialists are rare.

=== Punter (P) ===
The punter punts the ball to relinquish possession to the defensive team and to send the ball as far downfield as possible. This is usually done only on fourth down. The punter usually lines up 15 yards behind the line of scrimmage. However, this distance has to be shortened when it would result in being on or behind the end line. After receiving the snap, the punter drops the football and kicks, or punts, it through the air.

=== Holder (H) ===
The holder is usually positioned 7–8 yards from the line of scrimmage and holds the ball for the placekicker to kick. The player occupying this position is often a backup quarterback or a punter because of their good hands, feel for the ball, and experience taking snaps from a long snapper or center during plays from scrimmage. A holder is occasionally used on kickoffs if the weather or field conditions repeatedly cause the ball to fall off the tee.

=== Long snapper (LS) ===
The long snapper is a specialized center who snaps the ball directly to the holder or punter. They are usually distinct from a regular center, as the ball often has to be snapped much further back on kicking plays than on standard offensive plays. Long snappers are generally the size of tight ends or linebackers, as they not only have to be big enough to block for the punter or kicker, but also athletic enough to run down the field on coverage to try to tackle the return man. In the past, long snappers were often backup players; nowadays, this position is typically filled by dedicated long snappers.

=== Kick returner (KR) and punt returner (PR) ===
Return specialists are responsible for catching kicked balls (either on kickoffs or punts) and running the ball back. These are usually among the fastest players on a team and typically play either wide receiver or cornerback, as well. However, due to the relatively high likelihood of injury during kick returns, most professional teams will not regularly use their very best WRs or CBs as returners. Teams may also use the same player for both return positions or have a specific returner for punts and another for kickoffs.

=== Upback / personal protector ===
The upback, also known as the personal protector, is a blocking back who lines up approximately 1–3 yards behind the line of scrimmage in punting situations. Because the punter plays so far back, the back frequently makes the line calls and lets the long snapper know when the punter is ready to receive the ball. Their primary role is to act as the last line of defense for the punter; however, upbacks occasionally receive the snap instead on fake punts and will either pass or run with the football in those situations. Upbacks are usually played by backup running backs or linebackers. The upback, along with the punter, are usually the last lines of defense to prevent an opponent from returning a punt for a touchdown.

=== Gunner ===
A gunner is a player on kickoffs and punts who specializes in running down the field very quickly in an attempt to tackle the returner. They usually line up near the sidelines, where there will be fewer blockers, which allows them to get down the field quickly. Wide receivers and cornerbacks commonly play the position.

=== Jammer ===
Jammers try to slow down gunners during punts or kickoffs so the returners have more time to move down the field.

== See also ==
- American football strategy
- Glossary of American football
- History of American football positions
