= Billy Shaw =

American football player (1938–2024)

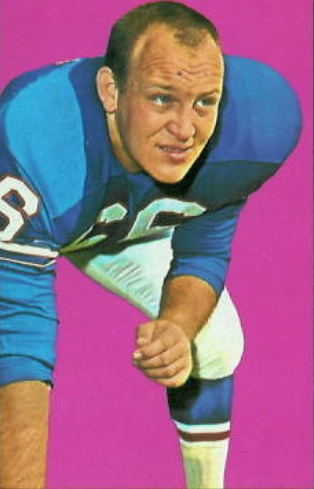
- Shaw on a 1966 Topps football card

No. 66
- Position: Guard

Personal information
- Born: December 15, 1938; Natchez, Mississippi, U.S.
- Died: October 4, 2024 (aged 85); Toccoa, Georgia, U.S.
- Listed height: 6 ft 2 in (1.88 m)
- Listed weight: 258 lb (117 kg)

Career information
- High school: Carr Central (Vicksburg, Mississippi)
- College: Georgia Tech
- NFL draft: 1961: 14th round, 184th overall pick
- AFL draft: 1961: 2nd round, 9th overall pick

Career history
- Buffalo Bills (1961–1969)

Awards and highlights
- 2× AFL champion (1964, 1965); 7× All-AFL (1962–1966, 1968, 1969); 8× AFL All-Star (1962–1969); AFL All-Time Team; Buffalo Bills Wall of Fame; Buffalo Bills 50th Anniversary Team; First-team All-SEC (1960)

Career AFL statistics
- Games played: 119
- Games started: 116
- Fumble recoveries: 5
- Stats at Pro Football Reference
- Pro Football Hall of Fame

William Lewis Shaw (December 15, 1938 – October 4, 2024) was an American professional football player who was a guard for the Buffalo Bills in the American Football League (AFL). After playing college football for the Georgia Tech Yellow Jackets, he was selected by the Bills in the second round of the 1961 AFL draft. Shaw was the prototypical "pulling guard" who despite his size held his own against much bigger defensive linemen like Ernie Ladd, Earl Faison and Buck Buchanan. He won three straight Eastern Division titles and two AFL championships in 1964 and 1965 with Buffalo.

Shaw was a first-team All-AFL selection five times (1962–1966) and second-team All-AFL in 1968 and 1969. He played in eight AFL All-Star Games and was named to the All-Time All-AFL Team. He made the All-Decade All-Pro football team of the 1960s. Shaw played his entire career in the AFL, and retired after the 1969 season. He is the only player enshrined in the Pro Football Hall of Fame who never played in the National Football League (NFL).

== Early life ==
Born on December 15, 1938, in Natchez, Mississippi, Shaw played sports all throughout his childhood. He attended Jett High School from 1953 to 1955, a small country school right outside of Vicksburg. He played as an end until the school dropped its football program.

In 1956, his father moved the family into Vicksburg so Shaw could continue to play football at the larger Carr Central High School. Weighing in at 188 pounds Shaw played offensive and defensive tackle during his senior year.

== College career ==
At Georgia Tech, Shaw was a two-way player from 1957 to 1960, at offensive tackle and defensive tackle. He was named to the All-Freshman Team in the Southeastern Conference (SEC).

By his senior year, Shaw weighed in at 220 pounds, earning SEC Most Valuable Lineman, All-SEC and All-American honors. "Actually," Shaw once said, "I thought I played defense much better than offense, and I still believe most of the honors I received were for my defensive play."

After the season, Shaw was named to the 1961 College All-Star Team. The coach worked him for two weeks as a defensive end until guard Houston Antwine injured his ankle. This was when Shaw began playing guard. The College All-Star Team that year played the Philadelphia Eagles. "I was scared to death," Shaw recalled about playing the NFL champion Eagles in the annual all-star contest. "I was up against Ed Khayat, a Mississippi boy who later finished his career with Boston (Patriots). I thought this might ease the tension a bit since he might take it easier on me. It was just the opposite. He turned me every way but loose." Shaw held his own, knocking the wind out of Eagle linebacker Maxie Baughan (who had been his roommate in college) on a big hit that attracted the attention of spectators.

In 1979, he was inducted into the Georgia Tech Sports Hall of Fame. He was named to the All-Time Bobby Dodd era Georgia Tech team. In 1985, he was inducted into the Georgia Sports Hall of Fame. In 1996, he was inducted into the Mississippi Sports Hall of Fame.

== Professional career ==
Shaw and the Bills offensive line depicted in 1964 painting.

Shaw was selected by the Buffalo Bills in the second round (9th overall) of the 1961 AFL draft and by the Dallas Cowboys in the 14th round (184th overall) of the 1961 NFL draft. "I had been in contact with the Cowboys mostly prior to the Bills getting involved," recalled Shaw. "The Cowboys wanted to play me at linebacker. We had lengthy conversations at that point in time. The Bills wanted to play me at either defensive end or an offensive line position. I really wanted to play on the defensive side of the ball as a defensive end. So that triggered a real interest for me (in the Bills)." When it became clear that the Bills wanted Shaw to play guard, he still preferred playing for the Bills because he felt that his size and speed would make guard a more suitable position for him than linebacker, which was a position he had never played before. Additionally, his Georgia Tech coach, Bobby Dodd, encouraged Shaw to play for Buffalo.

As a rookie, he became a starter at left guard and played in all 14 games, an accomplishment he matched for the first six seasons of his career. He contributed to the team winning the AFL championship in 1964 and 1965. In 1967, he suffered a right knee injury in training camp, which forced him to miss five games. He returned to All-Star form the next two years.

With Bills' running backs tending to be more durable than fast, Shaw became dominant as a pulling guard, often staying in front of the runners far down field. Shaw was known as "the driving force of the offensive unit." He was especially adept on short-yardage situations, when he would pull out from his left guard position followed by Cookie Gilchrist, Wray Carlton, Daryle Lamonica or Jack Kemp.

Shaw was a first-team All-AFL selection four times (1963–1966) and second-team All-AFL in 1968 and 1969. He played in eight AFL All-Star Games and was named to the AFL All-Time Team. He made the All-Decade All-Pro football team of the 1960s. Shaw played his entire career in the AFL, and retired after the 1969 AFL season, before the AFL–NFL merger. The 1962–1964 Bills are still ranked among the best in rushing touchdowns in a season in the team's record book.

In 1999, Shaw became the first and only player ever inducted to the Pro Football Hall of Fame without ever playing in the NFL. (The Bills, along with the rest of the AFL, merged with the NFL the season following his retirement.) During his speech, he forgot to thank his wife, Patsy. After taking pictures, he went back on stage and got on his knees and apologized.

In 1994, he was inducted into the Greater Buffalo Sports Hall of Fame. In 1988, he was inducted into the Buffalo Bills Wall of Fame. In 2009, he was named to the Bills' 50th Anniversary Team.

== Personal life and death ==
Shaw married his wife, Patsy, in 1960, and they had three children.

Shaw died from hyponatremia at his home in Toccoa, Georgia, on October 4, 2024, at the age of 85.

== See also ==
- List of American Football League players
