= List of Valparaiso Beacons in the NFL draft =

This is a list of Valparaiso Beacons players in the NFL draft.

== Key ==
B	Back	K	Kicker	NT	Nose tackle
C	Center	LB	Linebacker	FB	Fullback
DB	Defensive back	P	Punter	HB	Halfback
DE	Defensive end	QB	Quarterback	WR	Wide receiver
DT	Defensive tackle	RB	Running back	G	Guard
E	End	T	Offensive tackle	TE	Tight end

== Selections ==
Year	Round	Pick	Player	Team	Position
1952	22	265	Joe Pahr	Los Angeles Rams	B
1956	5	54	Fred Thurston	Philadelphia Eagles	G
1957	12	143	Charlie O'Brien	Detroit Lions	E
1960	11	121	Ken Young	Los Angeles Rams	RB
1962	20	272	John Knight	Pittsburgh Steelers	B
1973	12	300	Garry Puetz	New York Jets	OT
