= Student Body Right =

Play in American football

Student Body Right is a simple running play in American football known as a sweep right, in which the tailback runs toward the right end of his offensive line at the snap of the ball and receives a pitch from his quarterback before reaching the line of scrimmage, while his fullback, offensive tackle, and end move from the left side pull to the same side in order to serve as lead blockers for the ball carrier. The inverse play is known as Student Body Left.

== Origins ==
The origins of the play date to the tenure of John McKay as head coach of the University of Southern California Trojans during the mid-1960s. The popular explanation for the nickname is that in quarters during which USC was headed toward the end zone which contained student seating, the tailback would appear to be running toward the student section at the Los Angeles Memorial Coliseum, where USC played its home games, before cutting upfield. According to others the nickname emerged because when all the blockers were in place to protect the ball carrier it would appear, from the point of view of a defender, that the entire USC student body was leading the play.

The play was very similar to the Packers sweep utilized by the Green Bay Packers of the 1960s under coach Vince Lombardi.

== Later years ==
In the later years of the 20th century and early 21st, sweep plays such as Student Body Right became less common in professional and upper-level college football. This is generally believed to be the result of greatly increased speed and athletic ability of linebackers and defensive ends on typical teams, as compared to earlier eras.
