= Clipping (gridiron football) =

Gridiron football term

In gridiron football, clipping is the act of a "throwing the body across the back of the leg of an eligible receiver or charging or falling into the back of an opponent below the waist after approaching him from behind, provided the opponent is not a runner." It is also clipping to roll up on the legs of an opponent after a block. It is usually illegal, but in the National Football League it is legal to clip above the knee in close-line play. The Canadian Football League has similar definitions, prohibitions and exceptions, including that "application of [a] penalty is determined by the initial contact".

In most leagues, the penalty is 15 yards, and if committed by the defense, an automatic first down. It is prohibited because it has the potential to cause injury or death. Injuries that can be caused by a clipping violation include those to the collateral and cruciate ligaments and the meniscus. Clipping was first banned in 1916 in the NCAA, and rules prohibiting it gradually went into effect in various leagues in the years that followed. In recent years, clipping has not been called as a penalty as much as a block in the back.
