= Pulling (gridiron football) =

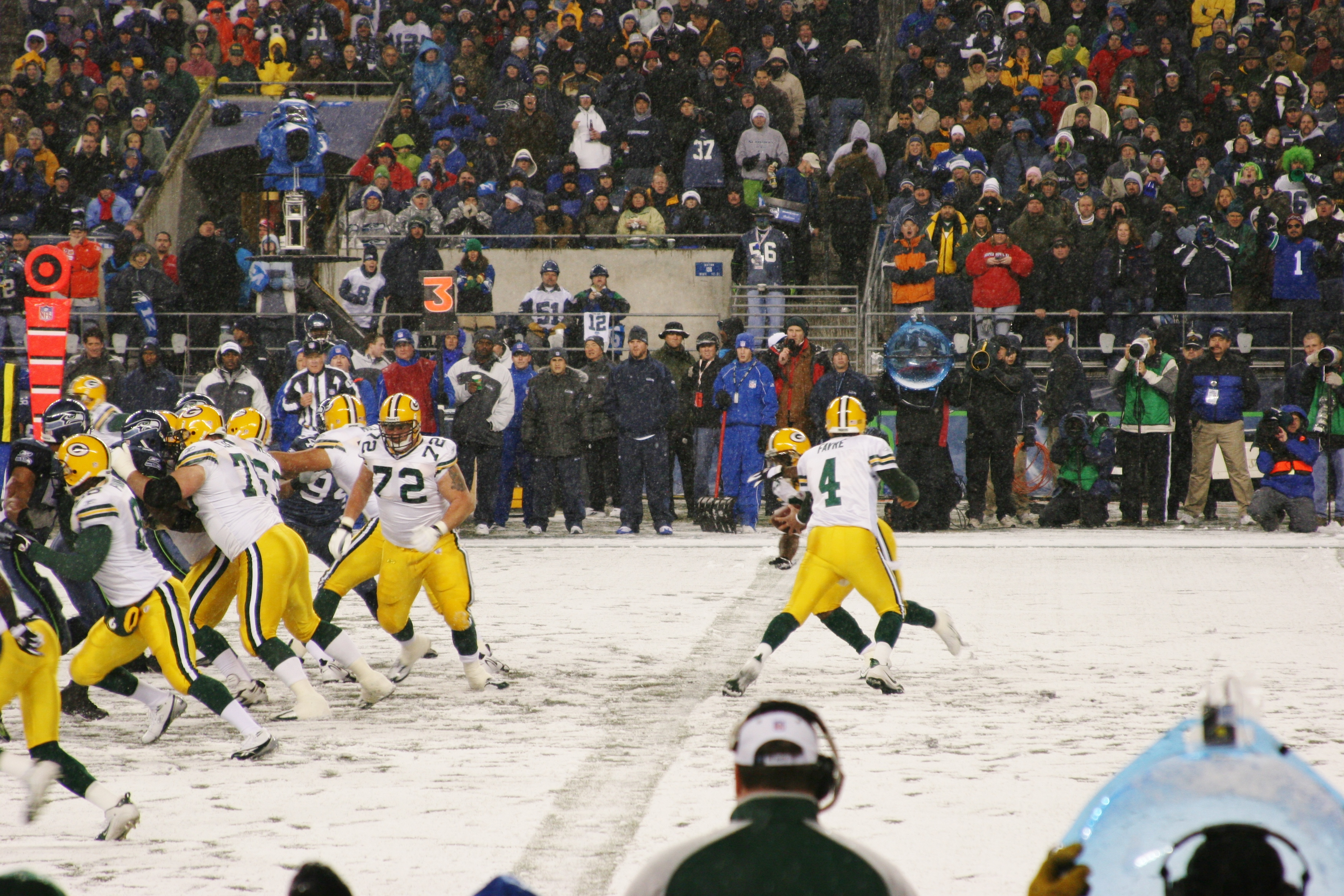
Jason Spitz (72) is pulling.

Pulling is when a blocking player in gridiron football leaves his usual spot in order to pick up another assignment on the opposite side of the field, running behind the other offensive linemen, to sprint out in front of a running back and engage a defensive player beyond the initial width of the offensive line.

== Guards ==
This technique is most commonly used by guards. In most playbooks, guards pull for outside runs as a lead blocker, such as a sweep play, and on counter plays, where the far-side guard pulls to block a play-side lineman.

Since the guard is free of responsibility for play-side outside runs and far-side counter plays, pulling is generally a unique responsibility for guards.

== Tackles ==
While tackles can also pull, this strategy is generally less common as they are too far away to pull to the opposite side of the formation (for counter plays) and have the responsibility of blocking the outside defender (generally the defensive end) for outside runs.

== History ==
John Heisman is credited with first pulling guards. Vanderbilt's Dan McGugin soon followed.

=== Trap block ===
Pop Warner invented the trap block with his single wing. The offensive line deliberately allows a defensive player to cross the line of scrimmage untouched, and then blocks him with a guard or tackle from the opposite side.

=== Packer sweep ===
In the 1960s, National Football League (NFL) coach Vince Lombardi of the Green Bay Packers utilized the Packers sweep play in which guards Jerry Kramer and Fuzzy Thurston rapidly pulled out from their normal positions and led blocking for the running back (typically Paul Hornung or Jim Taylor) going around the end. It was an integral part of an offense that won five NFL titles in seven years.
