= Toss play =

American football play

In American football, a toss play is any running play which starts with a pitch to the running back. In a toss play, the back often "curves out" towards the sideline on either side for a toss sweep.
