= Jammer (American football) =

Type of cornerback in American football

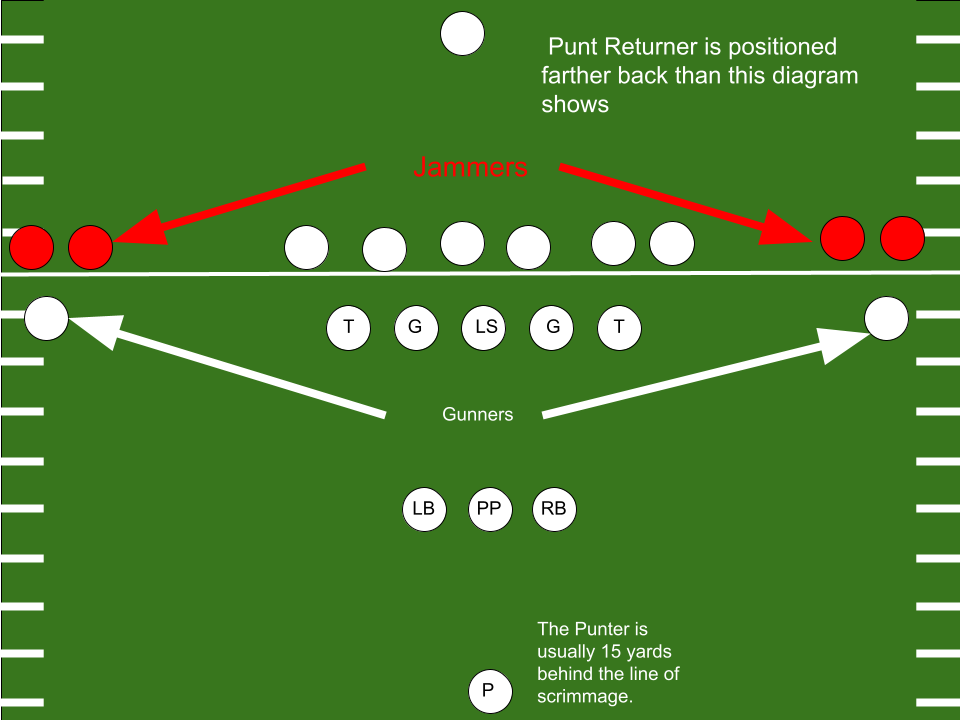
The circles highlighted in red are the jammers.

In American football, jammers are a specialized type of cornerback. Their task is to try to slow down gunners during punts by preventing them from getting a free release, giving punt returners more time to return punts. Depending on the special teams strategy, a special teams coordinator may choose to double-cover the gunner. A jammer is typically played by a back-up for another position.
