= Sweep (American football) =

Running play in American football

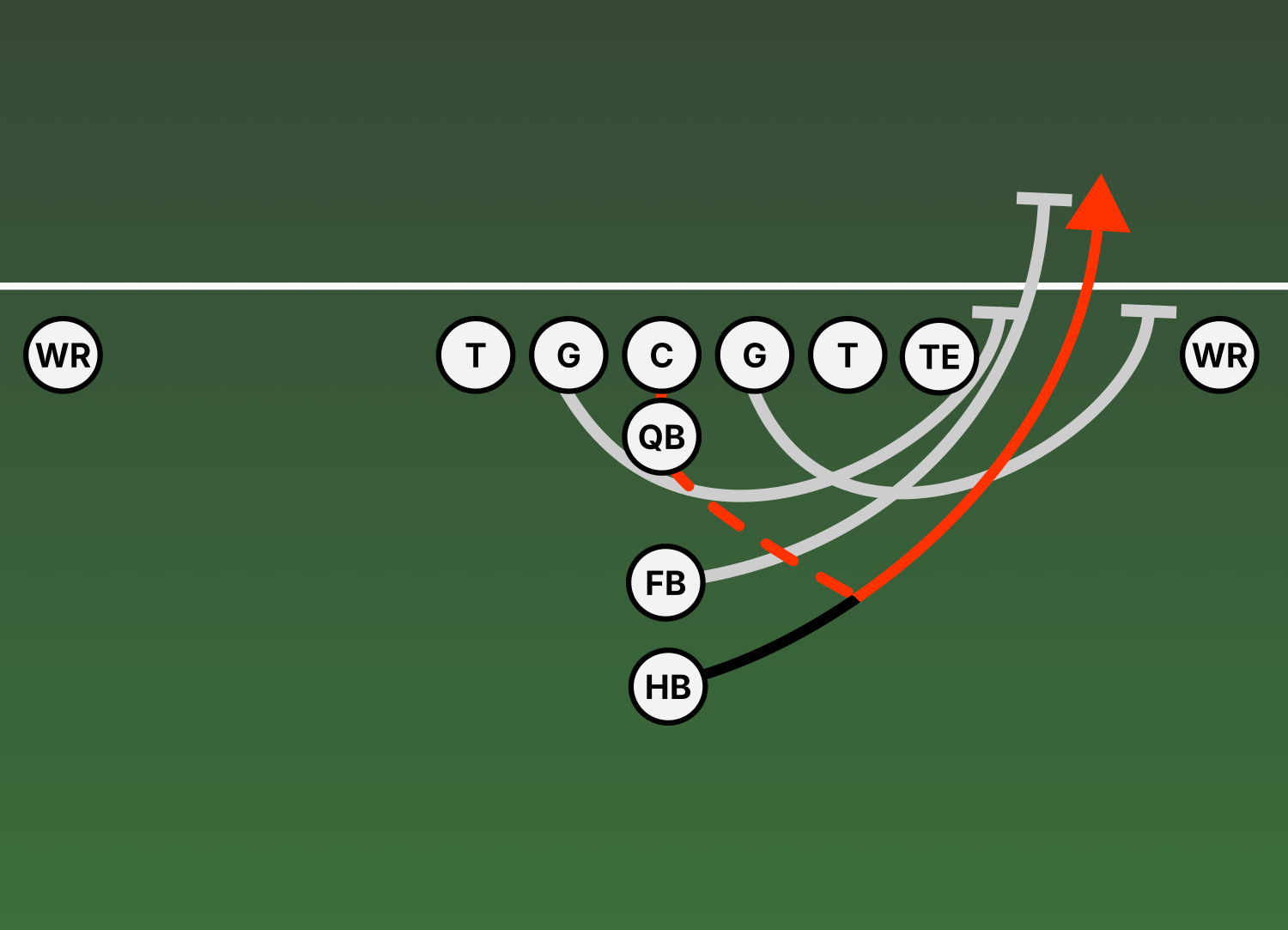
Toss sweep

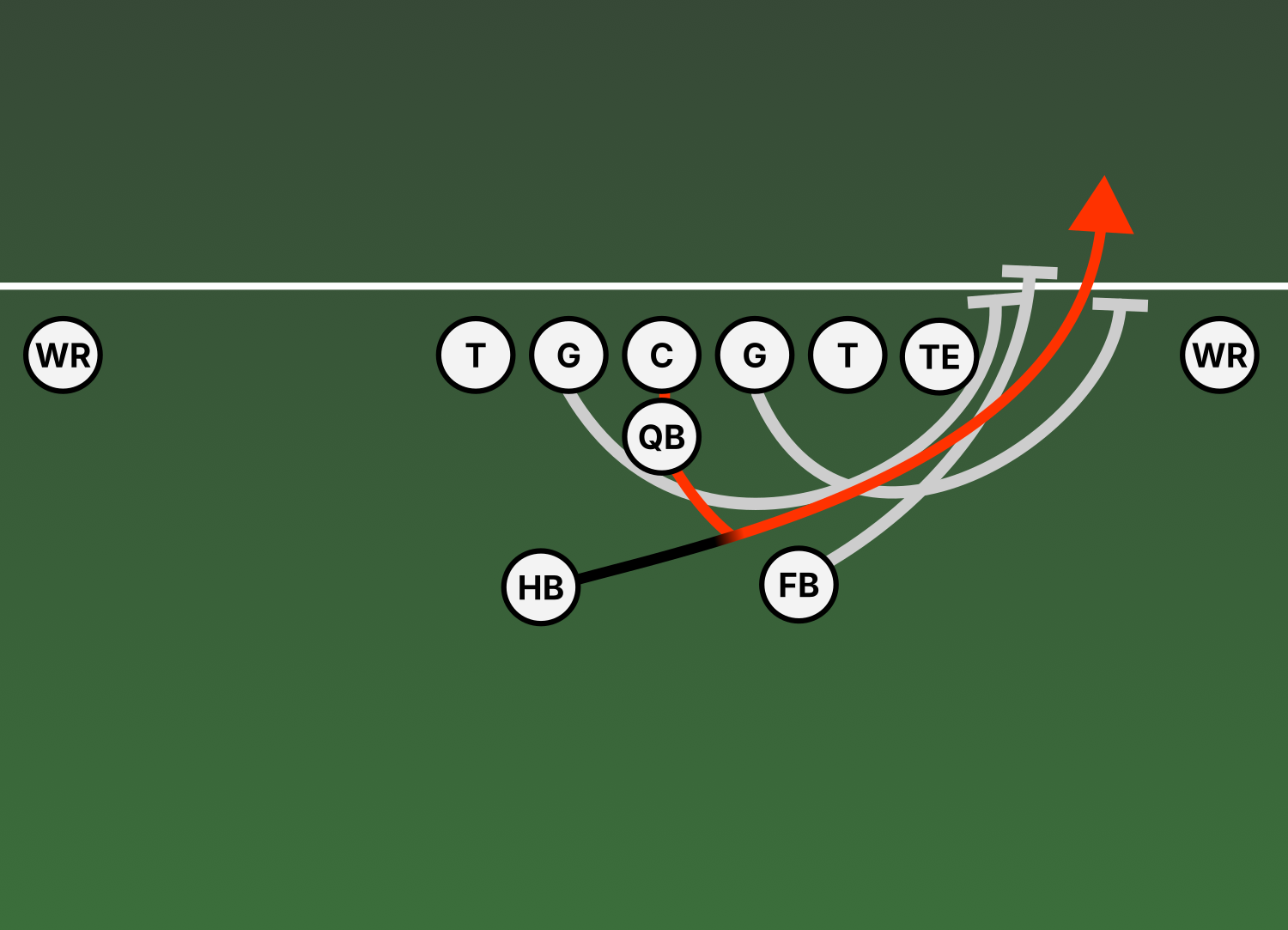
Buck sweep

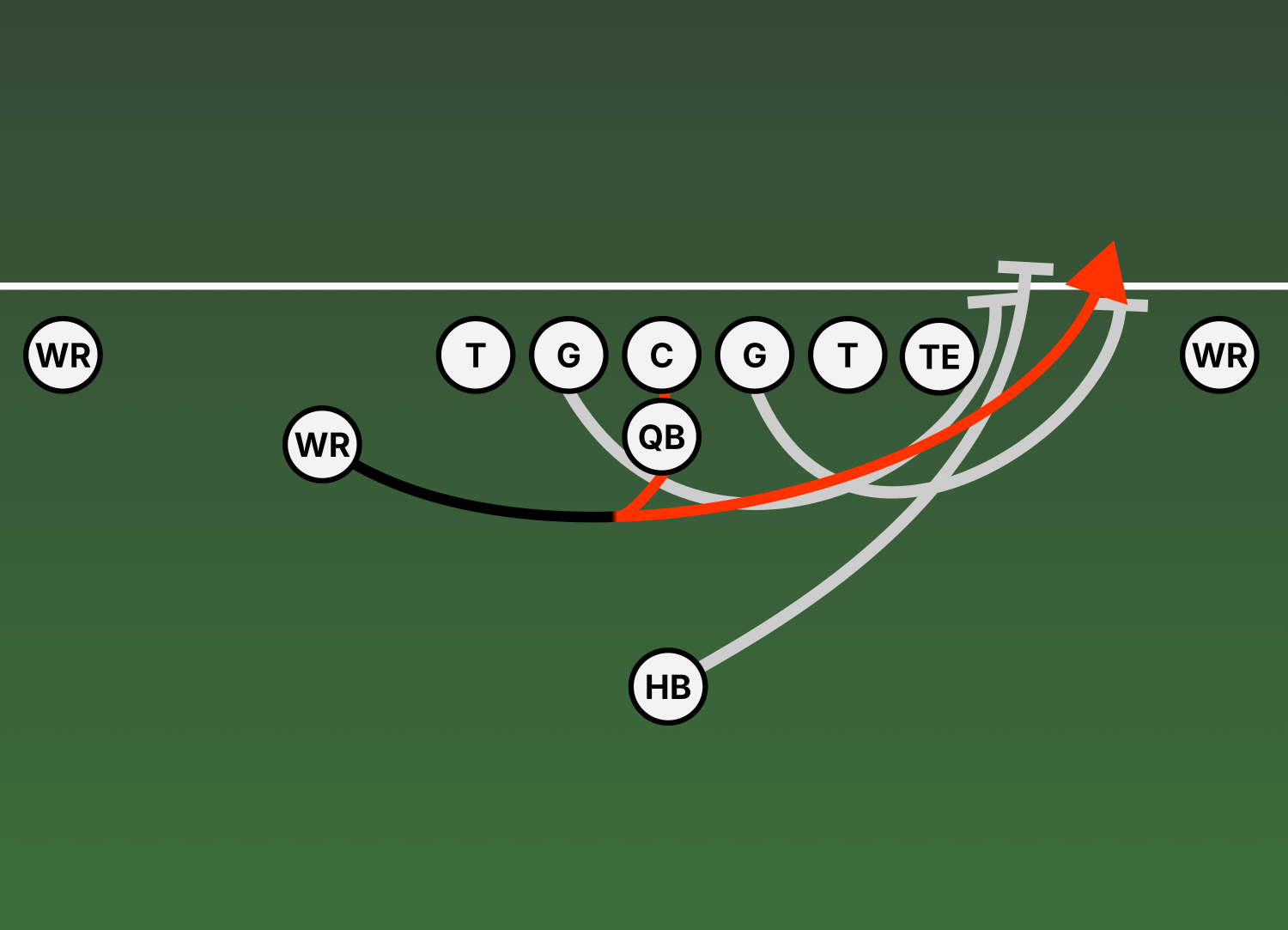
Flanker sweep

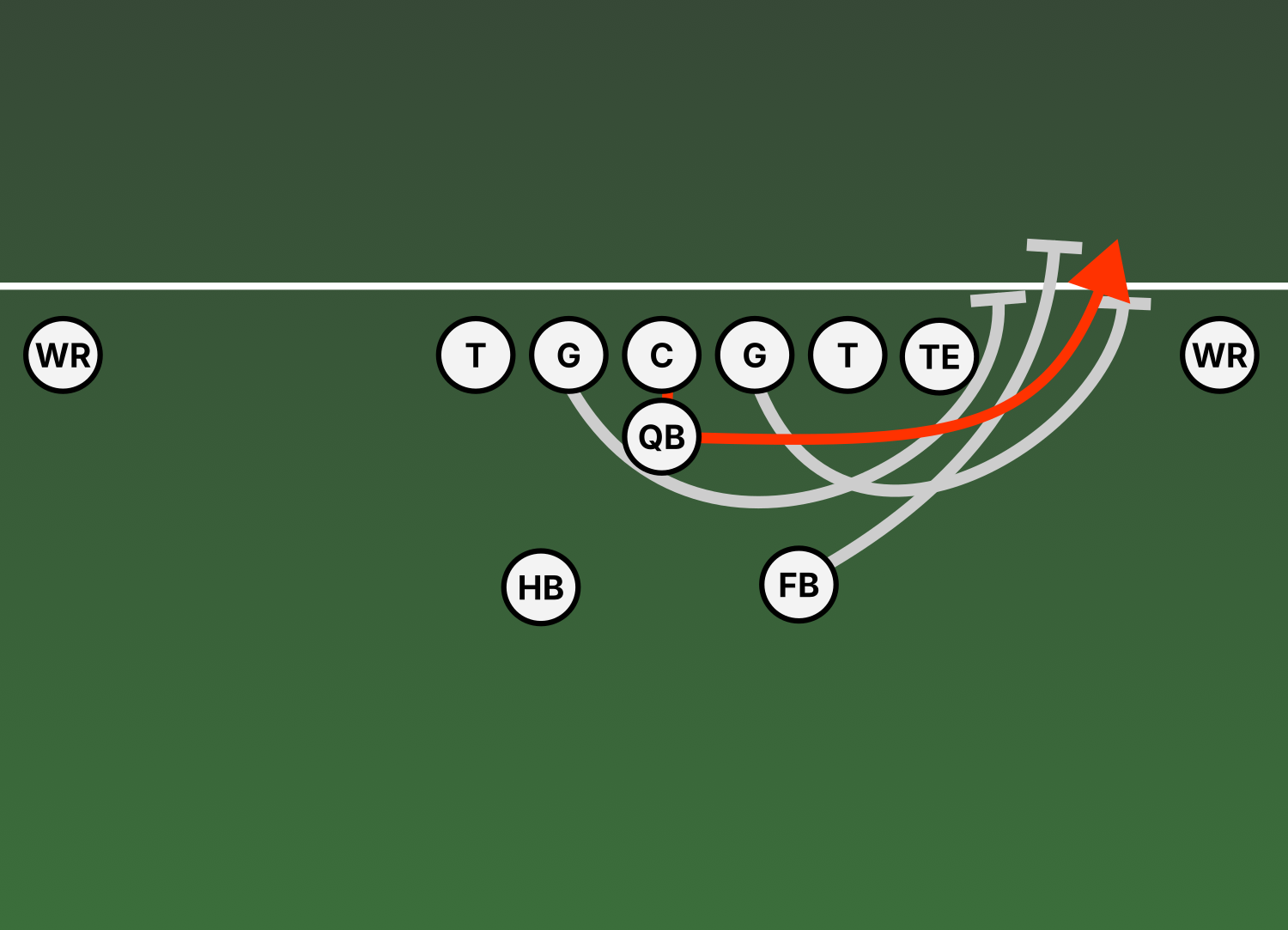
Quarterback sweep

A sweep is an outside running play in American football where a running back takes a pitch or handoff from the quarterback and starts running parallel to the line of scrimmage, allowing for the offensive linemen and fullback to get in front of him to block defenders before he turns upfield. The play is run further outside than an off tackle play. Variants of the sweep involve the quarterback or a wide receiver running with the ball, rather than a running back. When a wide receiver runs with the ball, it is known as a jet sweep.

== Types of the sweep ==
=== Toss sweep ===
A toss sweep is a play that is usually run out of the I formation or single set back formation. In recent years, it has also been run out of the pistol formation. The quarterback takes the snap, reverses out, then tosses the ball to the tailback. When run from the I formation, it allows the fullback to pick up any defenders who have penetrated into the backfield. Blocking from the offensive line ranges from straight zone blocking to pulling the playside guard. While this sweep does not have as many playfake combinations as the buck sweep, it tends to be more powerful and allows the running back to turn upfield faster.

=== Buck sweep ===
The buck sweep is usually run from a Wing T formation that includes a variety of play fakes. The quarterback takes the snap and fakes trap to the fullback. He then hands off to a halfback or wingback, who runs to the outside. The buck sweep is normally blocked by pulling the playside guard to kickout the force defender, and the backside guard pulling and turning up on the playsided linebacker. This allows for the other linemen to downblock on the other defenders, giving the offense an advantage when it comes to blocking angles. The buck sweep also provides an advantage in the possibilities available from its action, with the fullback trap before the sweep, a "waggle" pass, or bootleg after it, and the sweep itself.

==== Packers sweep ====
Vince Lombardi, head coach of the Green Bay Packers, was fond of the sweep. In the 1960s, he utilized the Packers sweep play—also known as the Lombardi sweep—in which guards Jerry Kramer and Fuzzy Thurston rapidly pulled out from their normal positions and led blocking for the running back (typically Paul Hornung or Jim Taylor) going around the end. It was an integral part of an offense that won five NFL titles in seven years.

=== Flanker sweep ===
Also known as the jet sweep or fly sweep, this sweep is a running play that is run from a set with a wide receiver (flanker) split out to the side away from the play, often run with the receiver in motion. The quarterback receives the snap and turns or runs toward the receiver, as the receiver makes a deep arc into the backfield behind the quarterback, where there is an exchange either by handoff or by pitching the ball to the receiver. This play typically resembles Student Body Right, in that every available blocker blocks to the playside. The variant that became popular in the National Football League (NFL) in 2018 is often run with the quarterback in a shotgun formation and the receiver crossing in front of him to receive the ball; when run in this manner using a pitch, the pitch is considered a forward pass, resulting in an incomplete pass rather than a fumble if the ball is dropped.

=== Quarterback sweep ===
The quarterback sweep is a running play where the quarterback takes the snap from center, typically in a shotgun formation, and then runs to the outside. This play can best be run by a fast, athletic quarterback. Sweeps often involve pulling of offensive linemen, usually one or both guards, to provide extra blockers at the point of attack. Teams such as the Arkansas Razorbacks have had success running this play by lining up the halfback as the quarterback in a wildcat formation.
