= Block in the back =

Illegal type of block in gridiron football

In gridiron football, a block in the back is an action in which a blocker contacts a non-ballcarrying member of the opposing team from behind and above the waist. The foul may be called when the area blocked is anywhere on the back. It is against the rules in most leagues, carrying a 10-yard penalty.

Violations mostly occur on broken field plays such as on punt and kick returns when players come to help returners and fail to get a proper angle to block the opponent, or when a player running with the ball breaks through into the backfield and pursuing players are blocked illegally by other members of the offence.

It is unknown when the penalty was first enacted, but it was prior to a 2006 rule change. It is known to have existed prior to 2006 due to many instances of it being called in older games. One such example of this is the 1997 game between the Dolphins and Lions when it was called on a punt with 8:18 left in the second quarter. The signal for this penalty is the ref holding his right arm out as to show a pushing motion and the left arm under the wrist of the right arm, both moving simultaneously showing the foul on the play.
