= Gunner (American football) =

Position in American Football

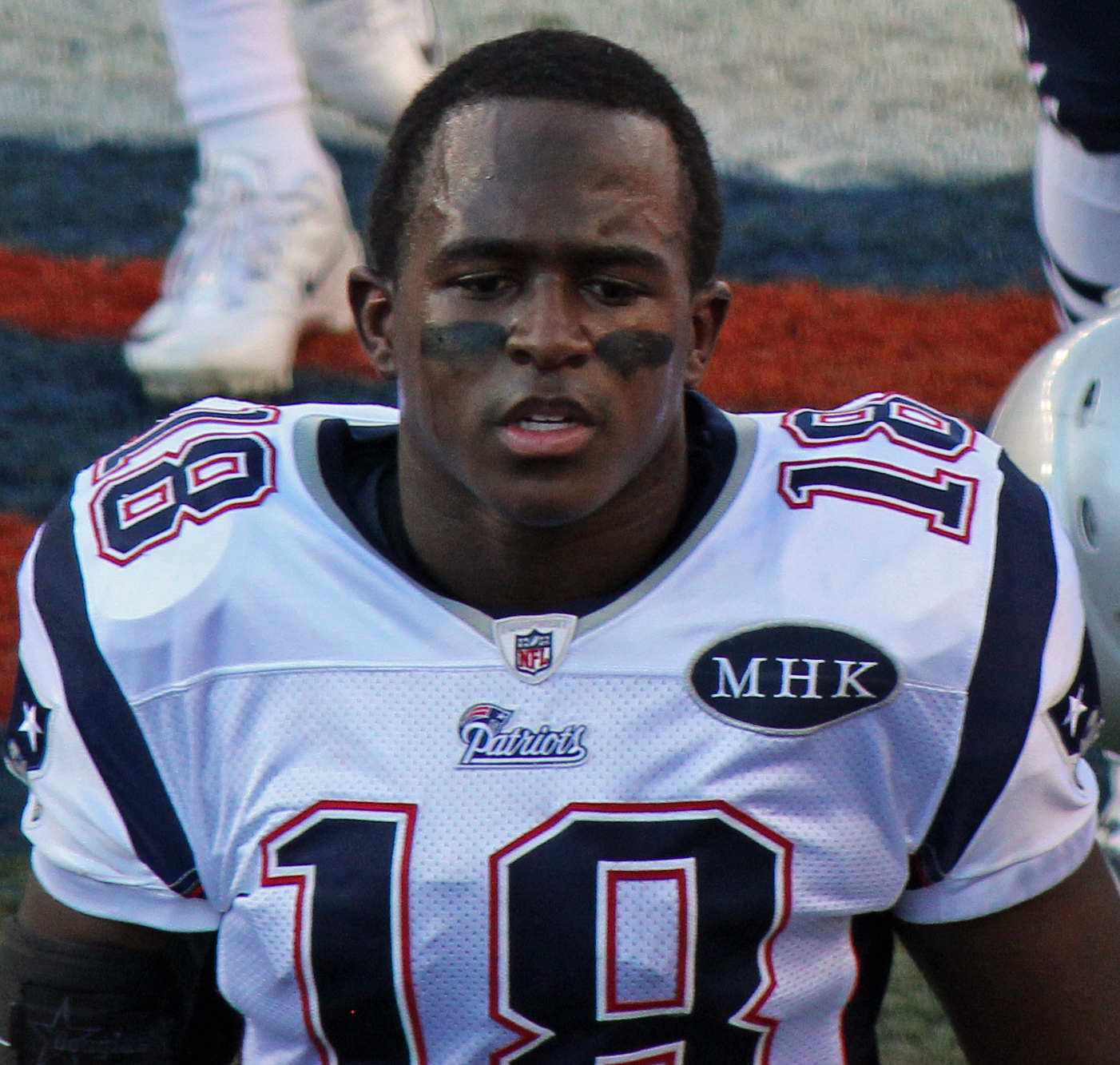
Matthew Slater for the New England Patriots was named to ten Pro Bowl teams, primarily for his role as a gunner

In American football, a gunner, also known as a shooter, flyer, headhunter, or kamikaze, is a player on kickoffs and punts who specializes in running down the sideline very quickly in an attempt to tackle the kick or punt returner. Gunners must have several techniques in order to break away or "shed" blockers, and have good agility in order to change their running direction quickly. Gunners on the punt team also must be able to block or catch.

Gunners typically also play positions as defensive backs, wide receivers, or running back when not on special teams, often as backups.

The counterpart on the return team is called the jammer, who is assigned to block the gunner of the punting team.

The NFL Pro Bowl features a "Special Teamer" position, along with a kicker, punter, and kick returner. This is often a gunner considered to be among the best. Steve Tasker, a 7-time Pro Bowler, is considered to be one of the top gunners in NFL history. Pro Bowler Bill Bates of the 1980s–1990s Dallas Cowboys was a well known gunner, known for daredevil plays. Ten-time Pro Bowler Matthew Slater of the New England Patriots is considered a top gunner who contributed greatly to the Patriots winning the Super Bowl in 2014, 2016 and 2018.

== Role ==
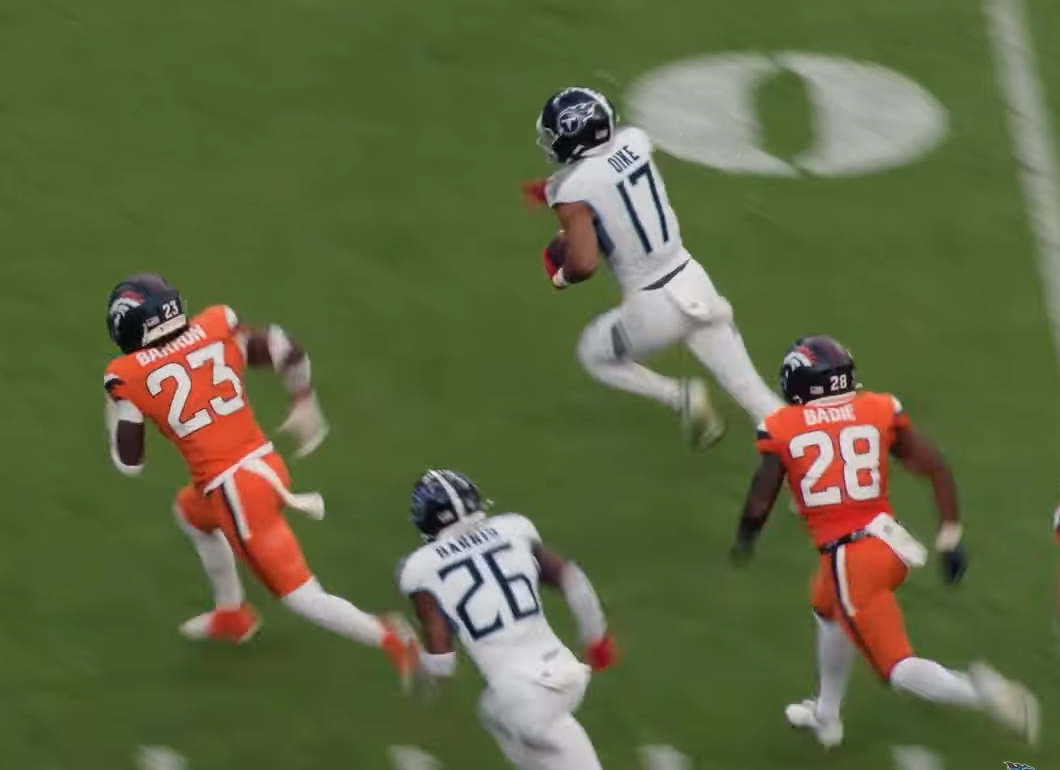
Denver Broncos cornerback Jahdae Barron (#23) and running back Tyler Badie (#28) serving as gunners trying to tackle Tennessee Titans returner Chimere Dike (#17)

On punts there will be two offensive players on the punting team lined up close to the sideline. These are called gunners. According to the NFL Rules Digest:

During a kick from scrimmage, only the end men, as eligible receivers on the line of scrimmage at the time of the snap, are permitted to go beyond the line before the ball is kicked.

These two eligible receivers on the kicking team―the gunners―are allowed to start running down the field as soon as the ball is snapped. The gunner's job is to try to get down the field as fast as the kicked ball and tackle whomever catches it. In the best case, they get there just before the ball and make the other team afraid to try to return it, leading to a fair catch. When a team lines up to punt, the other team lines up in a defense that is designed to also receive a punt. There typically will be one player lined up about 40 yards back; he is the punt returner, the player designated to catch the punt. There will also be a few players lined up on the gunners; these players are called jammers. If the defense lines up two defenders on each gunner, then they are hoping to slow the gunners down, catch the punt, and try to run the punt back for a long gain or even a touchdown. If there is only one defender lined up on each gunner, then the receiving team has extra players rushing the punter, and they hope to block the punt. If no defenders are lined up on the gunners, the punting team may throw the ball to one of the gunners to pick up the first down.

Gunners typically play a similar role in kickoff coverage, in that like other members of the coverage group, they try to evade the blockers and tackle the kick returner.
