= Trap run =

Play in American football

In American football, a trap run or trap play is a run consisting of a defender on the line of scrimmage (either a defensive tackle or defensive end) getting trap blocked by an offensive lineman or back from the opposite (other side of the center) side of the ball. The play is known as a "trap" because the strong side offensive lineman will "block down" on a linebacker, seemingly leaving a defensive lineman unblocked. As the defensive lineman comes through the seemingly open gap/hole, he is "trapped" by the weak side (also known as backside) guard who blocks the defensive lineman's blindside. Occasionally, a trap block will come from a tight end. Trap blocks by tight ends are known as "wham" blocks.

Typically, flow will start out one way (right or left) and the back will receive the ball going away from flow where the trap is taking place.

== History ==
Pop Warner is credited with inventing the play.
