= Hand-off =

American football technique

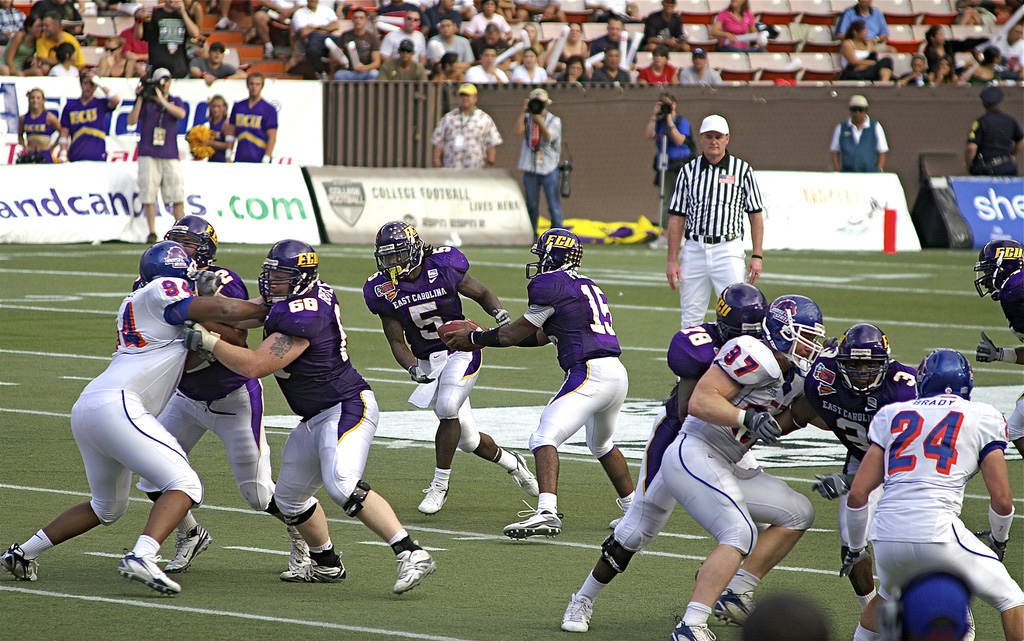
Running back Chris Johnson of the East Carolina Pirates (#5) receiving the handoff and rushing the ball during the 2007 Hawaii Bowl

In gridiron football, a handoff is the act of handing the ball directly from one player to another, i. e. without it leaving the first player's hands. Most rushing plays on offense begin with a handoff from the quarterback to another running back. The biggest risk with any hand-off is the chance of fumble on the exchange. A hand-off can occur in any direction. It is sometimes called a "switch" in touch football, and alternately spelled without the hyphen; i.e., "handoff".
