= Blocking (gridiron football) =

Sports move in American football

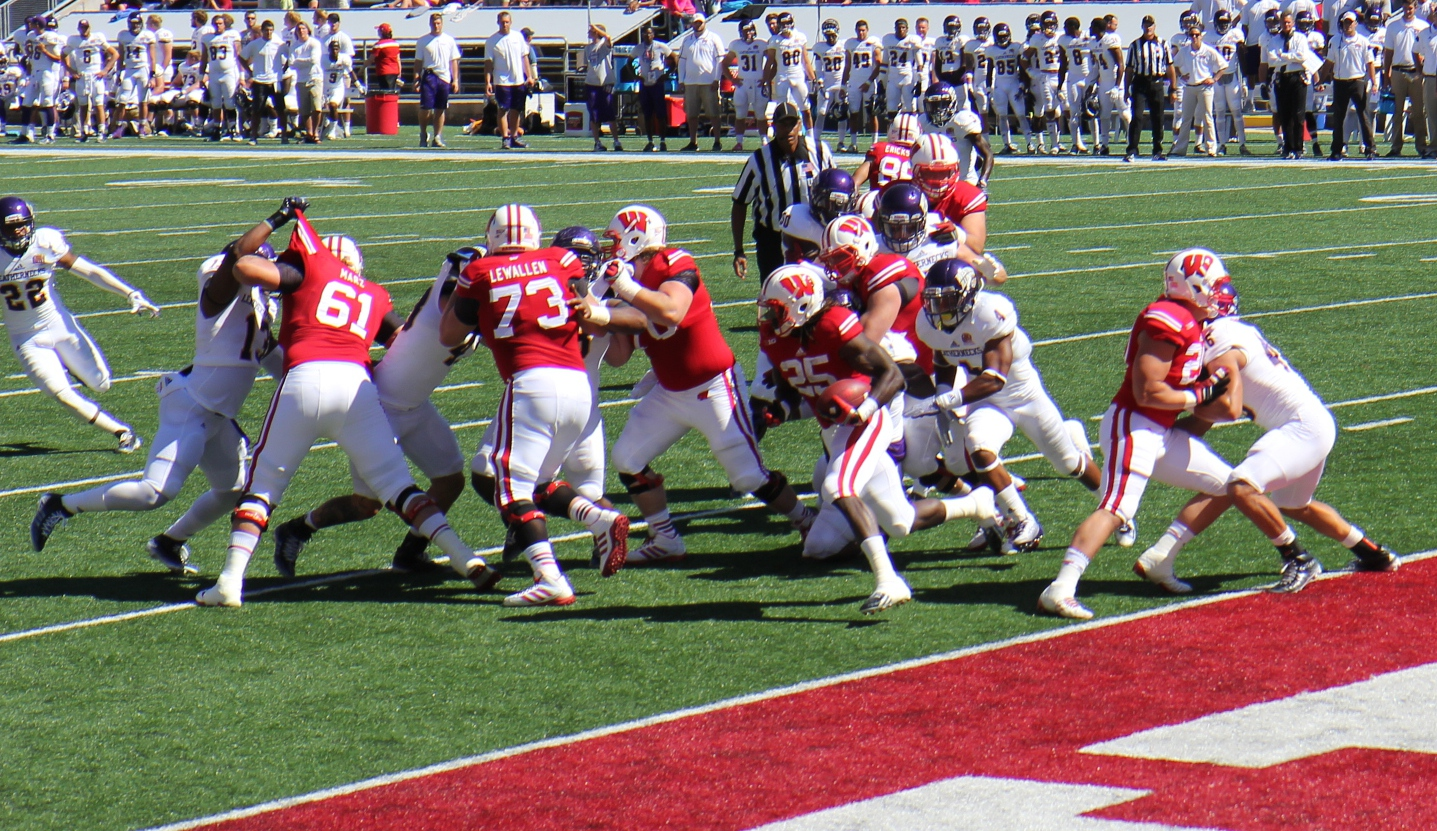
Linemen blocking for the running back.

In gridiron football, blocking or interference (or running interference) involves legal movements in which one player uses their body to obstruct another player's path. The purpose of blocking is to prevent defensive players from tackling the ball carrier, or to protect a quarterback who is attempting to pass, hand off or run the ball. Offensive linemen and fullbacks tend to do the most blocking, although wide receivers are often asked to help block on running plays and halfbacks may be asked to help block on passing plays, while tight ends perform pass blocking and run blocking if they are not running routes to receive passes. Overall, blocking is a skill that virtually every football player may be required to do at some point, even defensive players in the event of a turnover.

Essentially, blocking is pushing, with certain restrictions; in blocking one may not grasp another player or do any sort of pulling, and the hands must not extend beyond the line of each armpit; otherwise a holding penalty will be assessed. Players may not block a non-ballcarrying player of the other team from behind and above the waist, which is considered a block in the back. Blocking is also not permitted beyond five yards from the line of scrimmage until the quarterback has handed off the ball to a runner or a receiver has touched the ball after it has been passed.

Outside sports, "running interference" is a metaphor that refers to a person's helping someone in the performance of a task without directly assisting in the task. Often this is done by attracting attention to oneself (so as to deflect attention from the other person) or throwing oneself into harm's way.

== Types ==
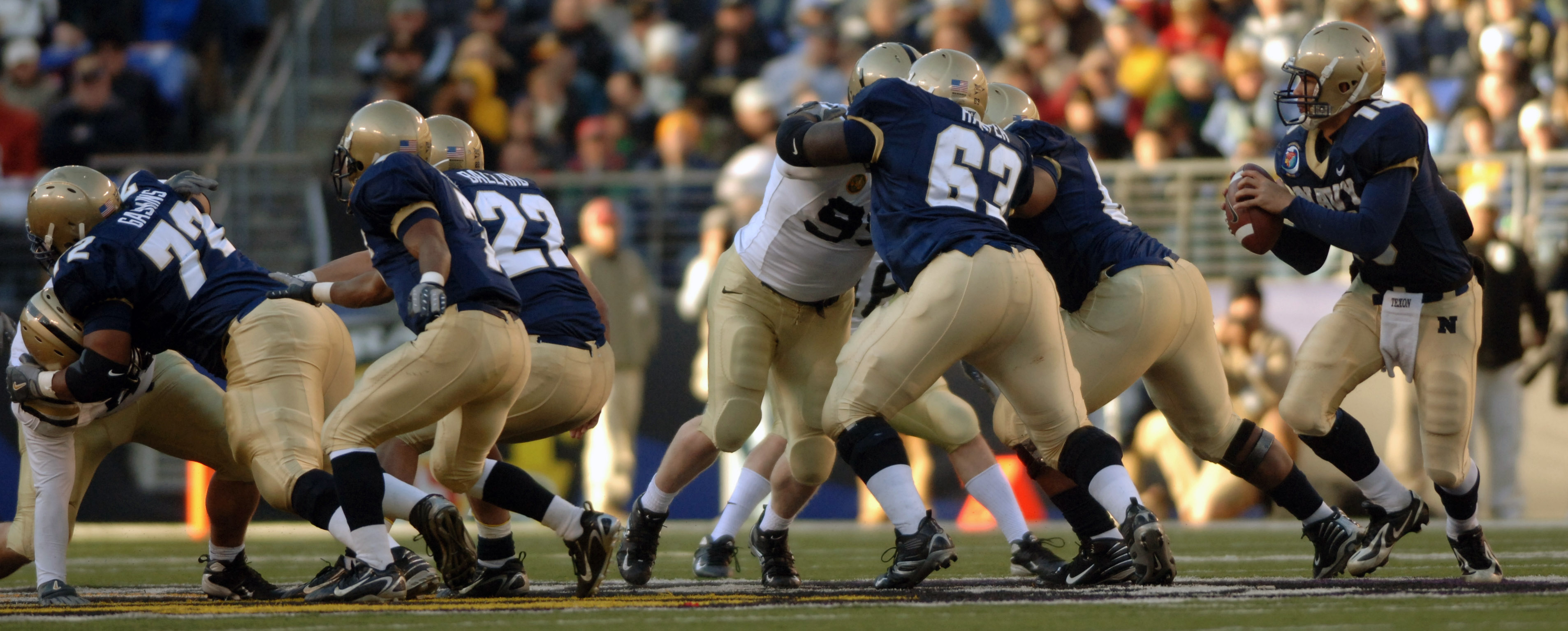
Navy's line blocking.

=== Zone blocking scheme ===
Zone blocking is a technique that is a simple and effective scheme for creating lanes for running plays. In a zone blocking scheme, fleet-footedness and athletic ability trump size as desirable qualities in offensive linemen. Coordination and technique matter more than muscle in implementing a successful scheme because defensive linemen are often double-teamed at the point of attack. In this blocking scheme, which takes much from the Veer blocking system, creating movement on the defensive line is more important than opening a specific hole in the defense.

=== Team support in zone blocking ===
One of the simplest reasons many teams have incorporated zone blocking in their offenses is that zone blocking rules do not change based on the defensive front. In a "man block" system, blockers are paired with defenders according to certain rules to create a running lane. If the defensive front changes, or if the defense stunts or blitzes, the blocking rules may change. This requires learning multiple rules for the same play. Zone blocking uses very consistent rules that do not change according to the defensive front.

Some teams base their entire offense on it, including the NFL's Washington Commanders, New Orleans Saints, Seattle Seahawks, Kansas City Chiefs, Green Bay Packers, and Los Angeles Rams. Adopting a variation of this scheme's core principles, the West Virginia Mountaineers rely on it in the run-based spread offense, devised by former head coach Rich Rodriguez and former offensive line coach Rick Trickett, that they have used even after their departure. The University of Iowa under head coach Kirk Ferentz, a former NFL offensive line coach, utilizes zone blocking and the inside/outside stretch play as the basis for their offense. The University of Michigan also started using zone blocking under head coach Lloyd Carr in the 2006 season, and continued to do so under his successor, Rich Rodriguez.

The Carolina Panthers made the switch to zone blocking under offensive coordinator Jeff Davidson for the 2007 season. They had previously employed a man-blocking scheme for a downhill running attack under coordinator Dan Henning, but during the 2006 season, the team's undersized linemen were consistently overpowered by opposing defensive linemen. The power running game became stagnant, and especially ineffective in goal-line/short yardage situations, thus resulting in Henning's firing and the switch to zone blocking. Thanks in part to the new blocking scheme they implemented, the Panthers saw their 2008 campaign characterized by the running of DeAngelo Williams and Jonathan Stewart to great effect, gaining them play off status. That season also saw the emergence of rookie Steve Slaton with the Houston Texans under their new Alex Gibbs-designed zone blocking scheme.

=== Linemen techniques in zone blocking ===
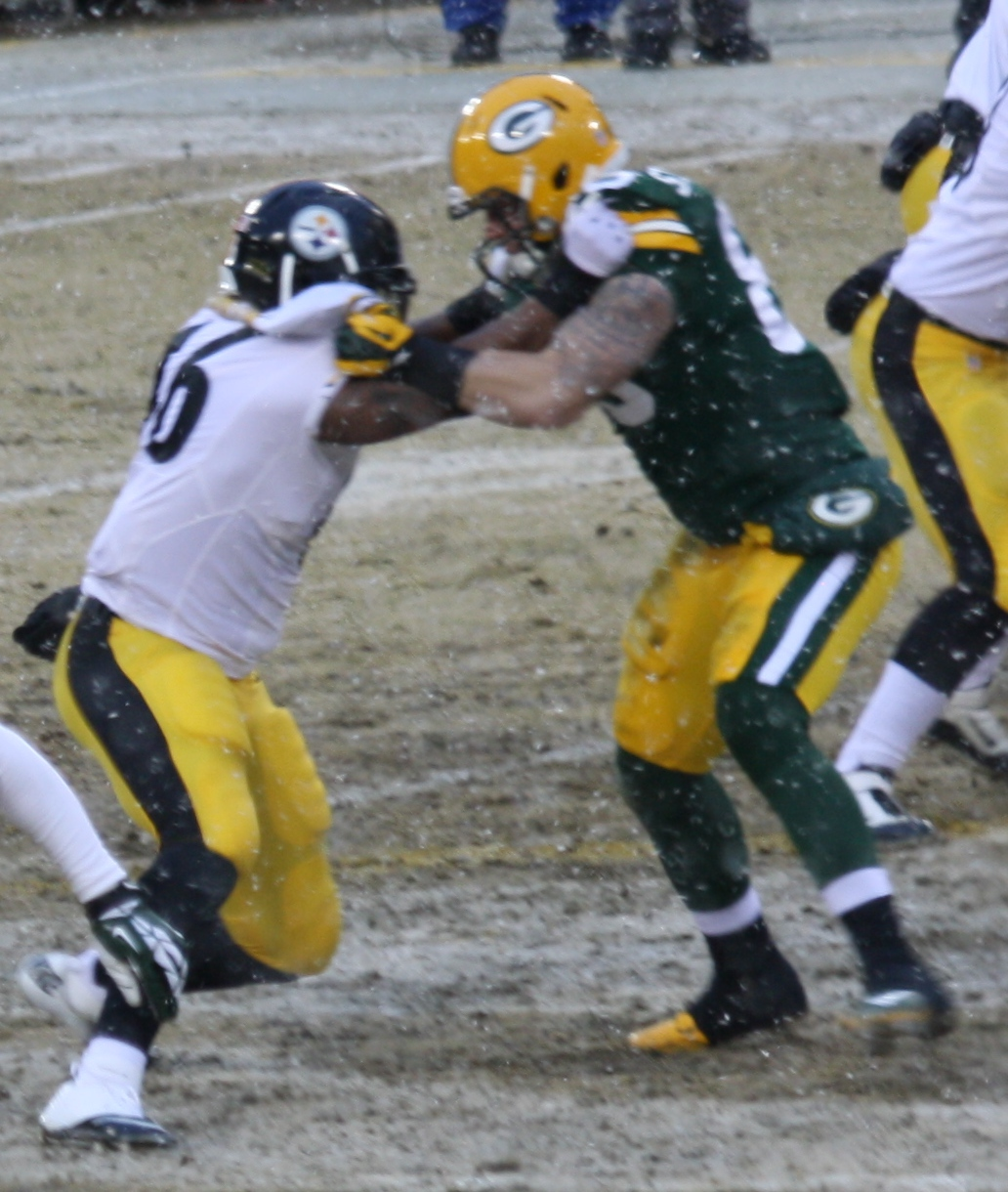
Blocking

Using a running back out of the backfield, zone plays are usually categorized into three types: Inside Zone (IZ), Outside Zone (OZ) and Stretch. These types describe the initial landmark of the ball carrier. A common approach is: Inside the tackles for IZ, just outside the tackle for OZ and just inside the last offensive player for the stretch.

For each type of zone there are many different blocking schemes available:

- The most basic form asks the offensive linemen to identify whether he is covered or uncovered. If uncovered, he is asked to help play-side on a double team by using wide lateral steps or even bucket steps. The resulting double team then reacts to the movement of the linemen as well as the movement of the linebacker. The initial movement of the double teams helps to equalize defensive talent and creates cutback lanes.
- Another scheme asks the offensive linemen to imagine a "railroad track" parallel to the running back's path and block everything they find on their way. This could be a linebacker, but also a slanting defensive linemen from somewhere else.
- Starting from either inside or outside, some offensive lines always pair two on one and use a fullback to block the remaining defender outside. This makes it necessary for the offensive linemen to use a variety of line-splits and steps.
- By using a counting system some offenses try to eliminate unfavorable matchups that can be the result of unusual defensive alignment. This is often used in conjunction with other schemes.
- For the outside varieties of the zone play a scheme that is called Pin&Pull has had great success. The linemen do not step play-side, but try to "pin" a backside defensive linemen, while the next backside offensive linemen pulls around the block and up to a track to the second level.

Today every NFL team uses some form of zone blocking but not all of them rely on it entirely.

==== Cut blocking controversies ====
The linemen of some teams that use zone blocking schemes have been criticized for their alleged penchant for cut blocking the knees of defenders, sometimes away from the play. Cut blocks are legal unless a defensive player is engaged by another offensive player. Although some consider the technique unsportsmanlike because of the risk of serious injury, when taught and applied correctly it is a very effective tactic. In fact, some defensive players employ the technique to eliminate blockers so other defenders can make the tackle.

==== Sophisticated schemes ====
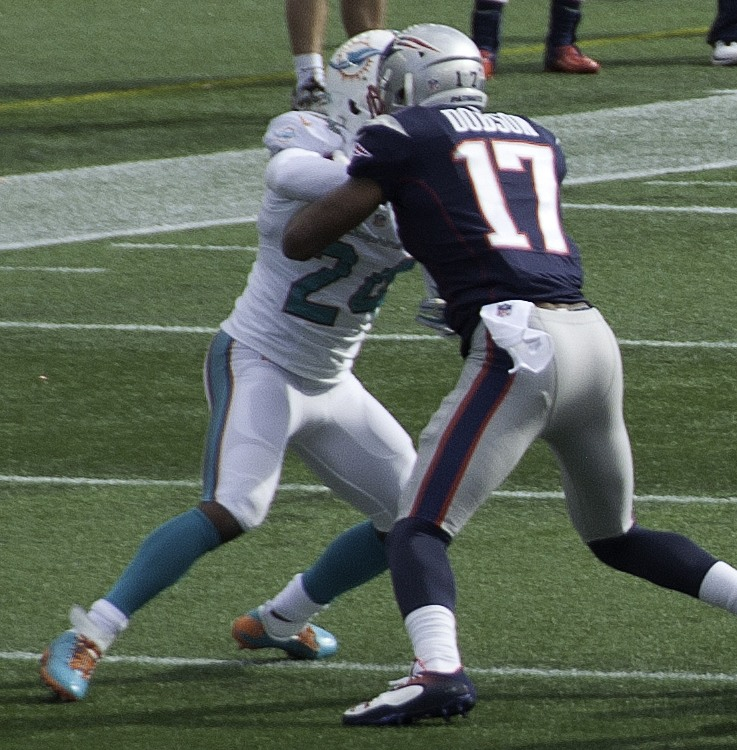
Receiver Aaron Dobson blocking

Zone blocking schemes frequently employ deception. For example, plays may be called in which blitzing defensive linemen and linebackers are permitted to rush into areas of the offensive backfield that are unimportant in the play called by the offense. Meanwhile, the offensive linemen who vacated the unimportant area migrate to the point of attack, blocking material defensive players.

==== Role of other players ====
Players other than offensive linemen may enhance the success of a zone blocking scheme. For example, in a run-based spread attack like West Virginia's the primary responsibility of receivers is less to catch passes than to execute downfield blocks, springing the ball carrier and extending the run.

==== Teams that relied on a zone blocking scheme ====
- 1959–1967: Green Bay Packers [HC Vince Lombardi]
- 1984–1991: Cincinnati Bengals [HC Sam Wyche]
- 1995–2009: Denver Broncos [HC Mike Shanahan and Josh McDaniels (kept scheme in first year)]
- 1999–Present: University of Iowa [HC Kirk Ferentz]
- 2001–2007: West Virginia University [HC Rich Rodriguez]
- 2001–2008: Bowling Green State University [HC Urban Meyer and Gregg Brandon]
- 2002–2006: University of Minnesota [HC Glen Mason]
- 2003–2004: University of Utah [HC Urban Meyer]
- 2004–2006: Atlanta Falcons [HC Jim L. Mora]
- 2005–2010: University of Florida [HC Urban Meyer]
- 2005–2009: University of Notre Dame [HC Charlie Weis]
- 2006–2010: University of Michigan [HC Lloyd Carr and Rich Rodriguez]
- 2006–Present: Green Bay Packers [HC Mike McCarthy]
- 2006–2013: Houston Texans [HC Gary Kubiak]
- 2007–2012: University of Oregon [OC Chip Kelly]
- 2008–2010: Oakland Raiders [HC Tom Cable]
- 2009–2009: Florida State University [HC Bobby Bowden]
- 2010–2012: Buffalo Bills [HC Chan Gailey]
- 2010–Present: Seattle Seahawks [HC Pete Carroll]
- 2010–2014: Washington Redskins [HC Mike Shanahan and OC Kyle Shanahan]
- 2012: Oakland Raiders [HC Dennis Allen]
- 2012–Present: University of Arizona [HC Rich Rodriguez]
- 2012–Present: University of California, Los Angeles [HC Jim L. Mora]
- 2012–2015: Miami Dolphins [HC Joe Philbin]
- 2012–Present: Ohio State University [HC Urban Meyer]
- 2013-2018: Arizona Cardinals [HC Bruce Arians]
- 2013–Present: Auburn University [HC Gus Malzahn]
- 2013–2015: Brigham Young University [HC Bronco Mendenhall and OC Robert Anae]
- 2013–Present: Dallas Cowboys [HC Jason Garrett]
- 2013–Present: Jacksonville Jaguars [HC Gus Bradley]
- 2013–Present: University of Oregon [HC Mark Helfrich]
- 2013–2015: Philadelphia Eagles [HC Chip Kelly]
- 2013–Present: Pittsburgh Steelers [HC Mike Tomlin]
- 2014–Present: Baltimore Ravens [HC John Harbaugh]
- 2014–2015: Cleveland Browns [HC Mike Pettine]
- 2014–2021: New Orleans Saints [HC Sean Payton]
- 2015–Present: Atlanta Falcons [HC Dan Quinn and OC Kyle Shanahan]
- 2015–2016: Denver Broncos [HC Gary Kubiak]
- 2016–2016: San Francisco 49ers [HC Chip Kelly]
- 2016–2018: Miami Dolphins [HC Adam Gase]
- 2017–Present: San Francisco 49ers [HC Kyle Shanahan]

== History ==
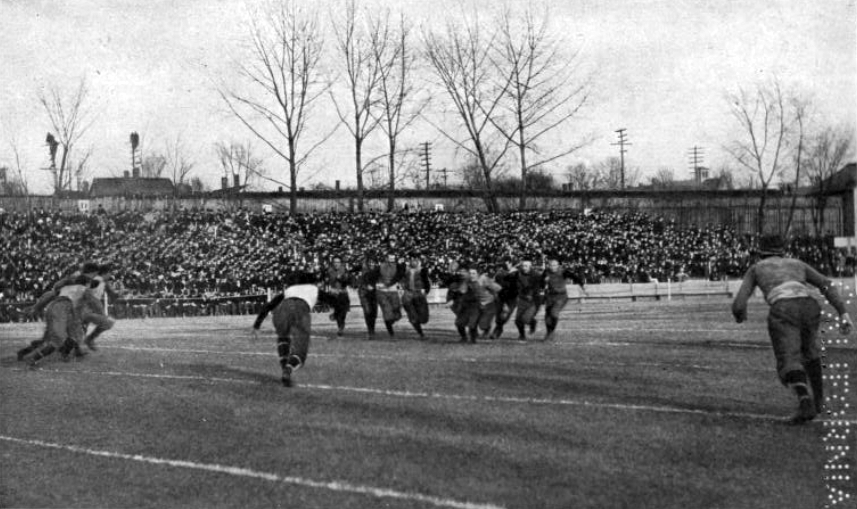
The flying wedge

Interference remains strictly illegal in both rugby codes, where it is known as "obstruction". The prohibition of interference in the rugby game stems from the game's strict enforcement of its offside rule, which prohibited any player on the team with possession of the ball to loiter between the ball and the goal. At first, American players would find creative ways of aiding the runner by pretending to accidentally knock into defenders trying to tackle the runner. Interference developed out of a practice called "guarding"; run by Princeton, wherein a player ran at each side of the runner, but not in advance.

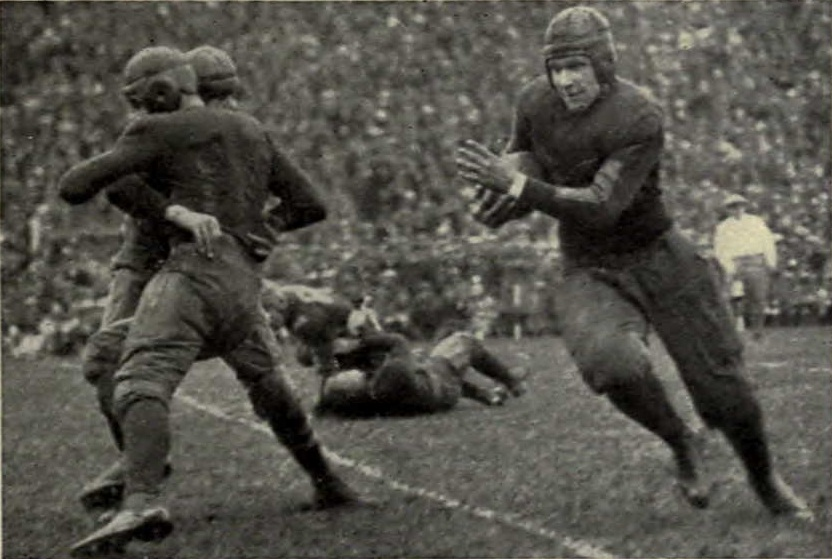
Michigan's Bennie Oosterbaan blocking, 1925.

When Walter Camp witnessed this tactic being employed during a game he refereed between Harvard and Princeton in 1879, he was at first appalled, but the next year he had adopted the blocking tactics for his own team at Yale. During the 1880s and 1890s, teams developed increasingly complex blocking tactics including the interlocking interference technique known as the Flying wedge or "V-trick formation", which was first employed by Richard Hodge at Princeton in 1884 in a game against Penn, however, Princeton put the tactic aside for the next 4 years, only to revive it again in 1888 to combat the three-time All-American Yale guard Pudge Heffelfinger. Heffelfinger soon figured out how to break up the formation by leaping high in the air with his legs tucked under him, striking the V like a human cannonball.

In 1892, during a game against Yale, Harvard fan and student Lorin F. Deland first introduced the flying wedge as a kickoff play. Two five man squads would line up about 25 yards behind the kicker, only to converge in a perfect flying wedge running downfield, where Harvard was able to trap the ball and hand it off to the speedy All-American Charley Brewer inside the wedge. Despite their effectiveness, the flying wedge, "V-trick formation" and other tactics which involved interlocking interference, were outlawed in 1905 through the efforts of the rule committee led by Parke H. Davis, because of its contribution to serious injury. Non-interlocking interference remains a basic element of modern American football, with many complex schemes being developed and implemented over the years, including zone blocking and pass blocking.

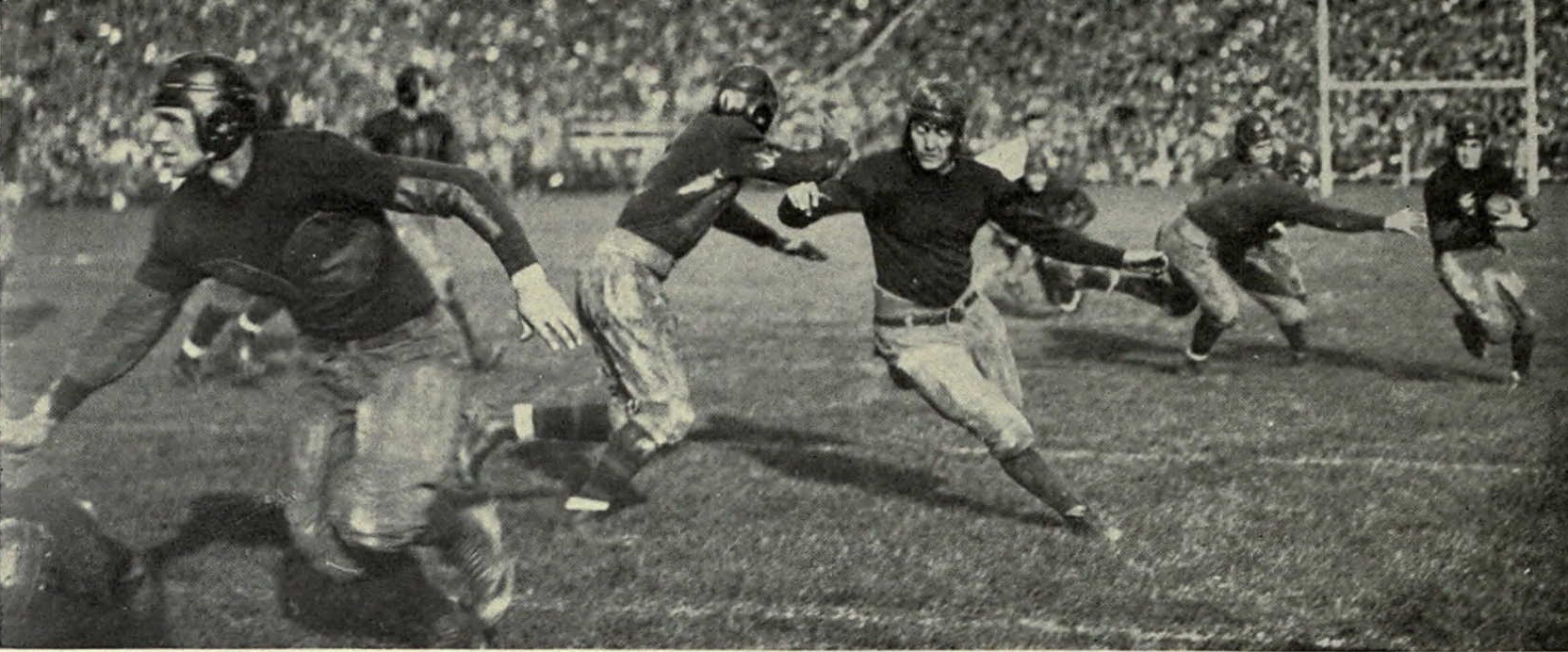
Michigan running interference, 1925.

The current body block technique has been attributed to one of football history's greatest head coaches: Pop Warner. Prior to his early 1900s coaching at Carlisle Indian Industrial School, blocking was done using one's shoulders. It was Warner who implemented the technique of blocking being done by hands rather than shoulders.

== See also ==
- Glossary of American football
- Shepherding, a similar tactic in Australian rules football
- Cut blocking
- Holding
- Pulling
- Zone defense

== Bibliography ==
- Powers, Francis J. (1969). Life Story of Glen S. (Pop) Warner, Gridiron's Greatest Strategist. Chicago, IL: The Athletic Institute.
