= Guard (gridiron football) =

Position in American/Canadian football

The positioning of the offensive guards in an offensive formation

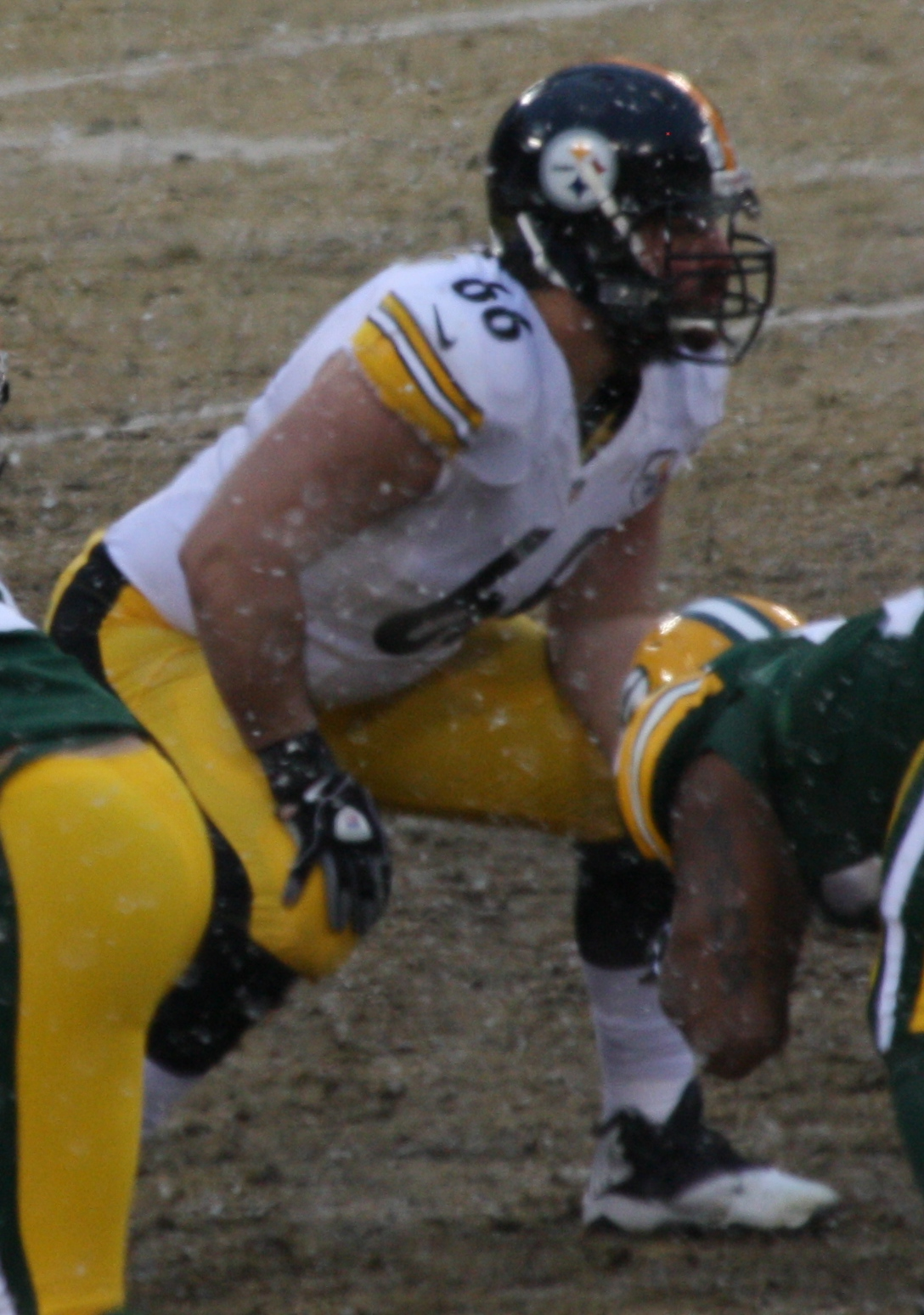
David DeCastro lined up as an offensive guard for the Pittsburgh Steelers against the Green Bay Packers defense in December 2013

A guard (G), also called an offensive guard and subcategorized as a left guard (LG) or right guard (RG), is a gridiron football position that lines up between the center and tackles on the offensive line. Guards are used primarily for blocking. The guard's job is to protect the quarterback from the incoming linemen during pass plays, as well as creating openings (holes) for the running backs to head through. Guards are automatically considered ineligible receivers, so they cannot touch forward passes unless it is first touched by a defender or eligible receiver.

== History ==
Historically, in the one-platoon system of football, "guard" referred to a two-way player that played both offense and defense, such as Truxtun Hare. In the two-platoon system, players began playing only offense or defense, hence offensive guard and nose guard.

== Pulling guards ==
Aside from speed blocking, an offensive guard may also "pull", which is when the guard backs out of their initial position and runs behind the other offensive linemen to sprint out in front of a running back to engage a defensive player beyond the initial width of the offensive line. This technique is used in most playbooks for outside runs, where the play-side guard pulls as a lead blocker, and on counter plays, where the far side guard pulls to block a play side lineman. Vanderbilt's Dan McGugin is credited with first pulling guards.

While tackles can also pull, this strategy is generally less common as they are too far away to pull to the opposite side of the formation for counter plays and have the responsibility of blocking the outside defender (generally the defensive end) for outside runs. Since the guard is free of responsibility for play side outside runs and far side counter plays, pulling is generally a unique responsibility for guards.

The Packers sweep was a signature play of the Green Bay Packers in the 1960s, and they won five NFL titles and the first two Super Bowls under head coach Vince Lombardi utilizing the play. The pulling guards for the Green Bay Packers were Fuzzy Thurston at left guard and Pro Football Hall of Fame inductee Jerry Kramer at right guard.
