= Fuzzy Thurston =

American football player (1933–2014)

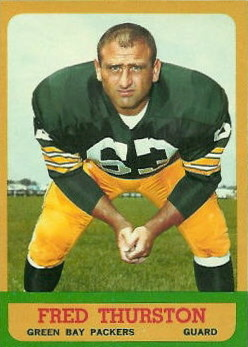
- Thurston's 1963 Topps trading card

No. 64, 63
- Position: Offensive guard

Personal information
- Born: December 29, 1933; Altoona, Wisconsin, U.S.
- Died: December 14, 2014 (aged 80); Green Bay, Wisconsin, U.S.
- Listed height: 6 ft 1 in (1.85 m)
- Listed weight: 247 lb (112 kg)

Career information
- High school: Altoona
- College: Valparaiso
- NFL draft: 1956: 5th round, 54th overall pick

Career history
- Baltimore Colts (1958); Green Bay Packers (1959–1967)

Awards and highlights
- 2× Super Bowl champion (I, II); 6× NFL champion (1958, 1961, 1962, 1965–1967); First-team All-Pro (1961); 4× Second-team All-Pro (1962, 1963, 1964, 1966); Green Bay Packers Hall of Fame

Career NFL statistics
- Games played: 116
- Games started: 90
- Stats at Pro Football Reference

Frederick Charles "Fuzzy" Thurston (December 29, 1933 – December 14, 2014) was an American professional football player who was an offensive guard for the Baltimore Colts and Green Bay Packers of the National Football League (NFL). He played college football at Valparaiso.

== Early life ==
Born and raised in the small western Wisconsin town of Altoona, Thurston accepted a basketball scholarship to Valparaiso University in northwest Indiana, and didn't play collegiate football for the Crusaders until his junior season (1954). He played basketball because his high school didn't have a football team. Thurston played junior varsity basketball as a 190-pound freshman at Valparaiso before gaining 40 pounds and joining the football team his sophomore year. He led Valparaiso to an Indiana Collegiate Conference title and was twice selected All-American. Thurston was also named All-Conference for the 1954 and 1955 seasons, while being named the conference's top lineman in 1955. He was selected 54th overall by the Philadelphia Eagles in the fifth round of the 1956 NFL draft.

== Professional career ==
As the left guard, Thurston was a key member of the Packers' offensive line during the team's glory years under head coach Vince Lombardi, when they won five NFL championships and the first two Super Bowls. Paired with hall of famer Jerry Kramer at right guard, they led the vaunted Packers sweep running attack. Thurston was named to the 1961 and 1962 All-Pro teams.

Prior to joining the Packers, Thurston played the 1958 season with the NFL champion Baltimore Colts. Thus, Thurston is one of only four players in pro football history to play on six NFL championship teams. He was inducted into the Green Bay Packers Hall of Fame in January 1975.

In response to a sportswriter's question about how he prepared for the famous Ice Bowl game in 1967, when the gametime temperature was −13 °F (−25 °C) (with a wind chill well below that), Thurston responded that he drank "about ten vodkas" in order to stay warm. He remained popular in Wisconsin after his playing days and could often be found at Fuzzy's, a bar he owned not far from Lambeau Field and at The Left Guard, a bar and restaurant he owned in Menasha.

Thurston was elected to the Indiana Football Hall of Fame in 1982, and the Wisconsin Athletic Hall of Fame in 2003. He was the first athlete ever to be voted in by the people of Wisconsin, even though the Hall had been founded in 1951. The Professional Football Researchers Association named Thurston to the PRFA Hall of Very Good Class of 2006.

== Death ==
After several years of declining health, Thurston died at age 80 in Green Bay, battling Alzheimer's disease and cancer.
