= 23 Blast =

- Theatrical release poster
- Directed by: Dylan Baker
- Written by: Bram Hoover; Toni Hoover
- Based on: Real-life story of Travis Freeman
- Produced by: Gary Donatelli; Dylan Baker; Toni Hoover; Daniel Snyder; Misook Doolittle; Brent Ryan Green
- Starring: Stephen Lang; Alexa PenaVega; Mark Hapka; Max Adler; Kim Zimmer; Bram Hoover; Timothy Busfield; Fred Thompson; Becky Ann Baker; Dylan Baker
- Cinematography: Jay Silver
- Edited by: Matt Mayer
- Music by: John Carta
- Production companies: Touchdown Productions, LLC; Toy Gun Films
- Distributed by: Ocean Avenue Entertainment
- Release dates: October 20, 2013 (Hartland Film Festival); October 24, 2014 (United States)
- Running time: 98 minutes
- Country: United States
- Language: English
- Budget: $1 million
- Box office: $549,185

23 Blast is a 2013 American sports drama film directed by Dylan Baker. The film was written by Bram and Toni Hoover, inspired by the story of Travis Freeman, a Kentucky teen who loses his sight, but eventually overcomes the challenges of his disability, and continues to live his dream of playing football. Travis is portrayed by Mark Hapka in the film.

The film was produced by Touchdown Productions, LLC and Toy Gun Films. Stephen Lang, Alexa PenaVega, Max Adler and Becky Ann Baker also starred in the film.

== Plot ==
Travis Freeman, a local football star, is an average high school junior. Living in the town of Corbin, Kentucky, his inner circle includes his supporting parents, girlfriend, and childhood best friend, Jerry Baker (Bram Hoover) Life is normal for Travis until one day, he is stricken with a series of severe headaches and a bacterial meningitis infection. After being rushed to the hospital, Travis undergoes surgery to remove the infection and save his life. He comes out of the procedure alive, but he is now blind. After losing his sight, Travis experiences depression as he adjusts to life without sight. When forced to abandon football, Travis’ shallow, cheerleader girlfriend quits on him, and he faces the decision of having to attend the school for the blind away from home. With the help of his parents, best friend, Jerry, another childhood friend, Ashley, and his mobility coach, Travis pulls through and is able to adapt to his new disability and starts his senior year at Corbin High School. Every day after school, Travis attends football practice, but stays, with help from his friend, Ashley, on the sidelines. His coach and mentor, Coach Farris, approaches him one day about joining the team again. Without much convincing, Travis rejoins the football team as a center and helps the team turn around their losing season advancing to the state playoffs.

== Cast ==
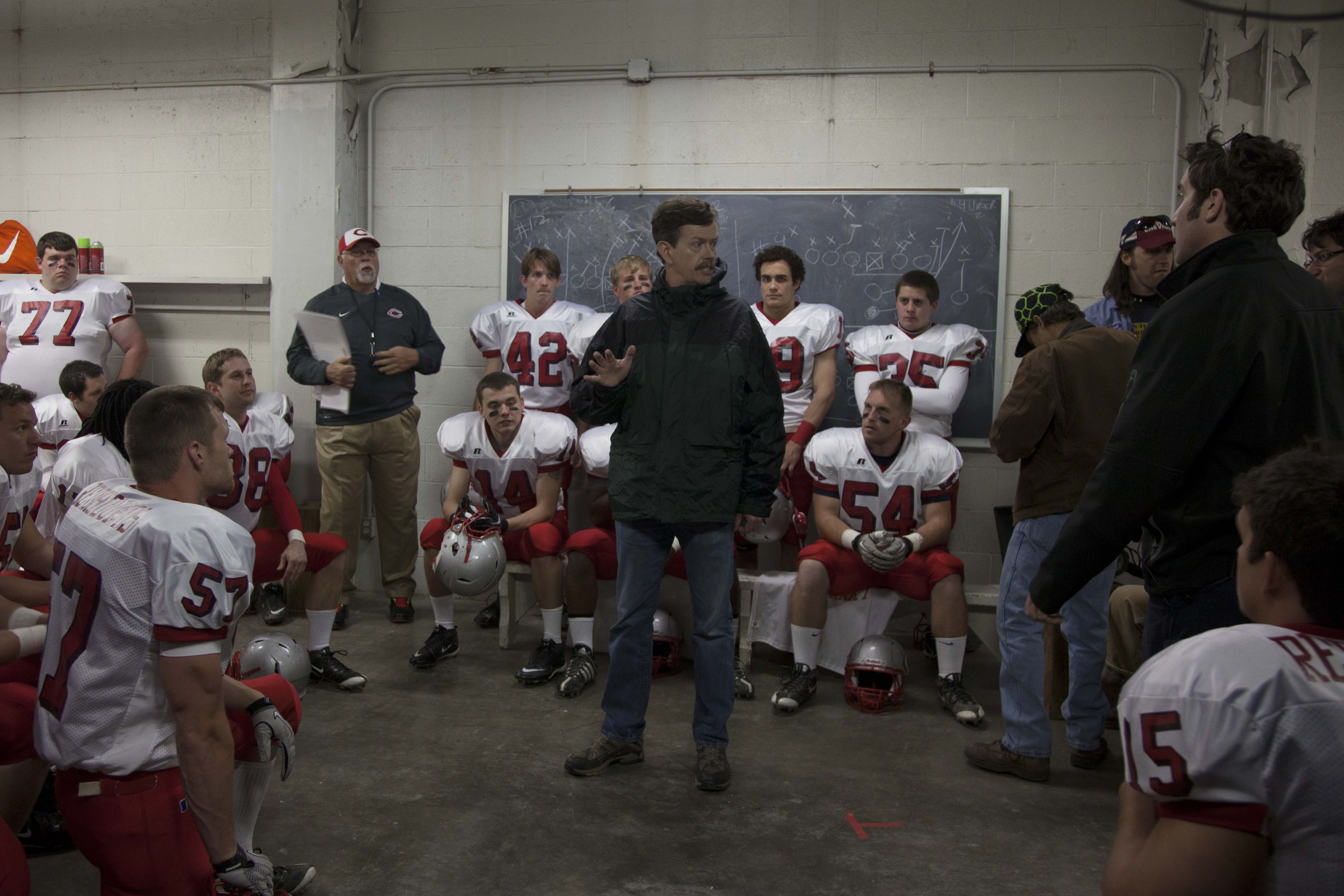
Actor Dylan Baker in his directorial debut for 23 Blast.

Actor Dylan Baker in his directorial debut for 23 Blast.

- Mark Hapka as Travis Freeman
- Bram Hoover as Jerry Baker
- Alexa Vega as Ashley
- Max Adler as Cameron Marshall
- Stephen Lang as Coach Farris
- Becky Ann Baker as Patty Wheatley
- Dylan Baker as Larry Freeman
- Kim Zimmer as Mary Freeman
- Timothy Busfield as Jasper A. Duncan
- Fred Thompson as Coach Powers
- Scott Sowers as Mr. Marshal
- Isiah Whitlock, Jr. as Dr. Connelly
- Crystal Hunt as Molly

Director Dylan Baker used his personal network in casting the film, using friends for several key roles. Stephen Lang was known for playing mean or unlikable people, and was Baker's first choice to play coach Willard Farris. Originally Bram Hoover was slated to play Travis, but was recast to the role of Jerry. Baker cast his wife Becky Ann Baker as Patty Wheatley. Baker employed former colleagues Fred Dalton Thompson, Timothy Busfield and Kevin Cooney in their respective roles. Baker held auditions in Los Angeles and cast Mark Hapka, Alexa PenaVega and Max Adler in the same day. Kim Zimmer was originally slated to play the role of Molly's mother, which did not survive the final cut of the film. Kim was then recast as Mary Freeman, Travis's mother.

== Production ==
=== Development ===
Toni Hoover approached Dylan Baker's wife, Becky Ann Baker, about a script she had written for 23 Blast. The Bakers initially intended to only act in the film, but Dylan Baker soon began to help in the writing and casting processes. Hoover then approached Baker about directing the project and he agreed. Baker approached Gary Donatelli about assisting on the project, due to his work for Monday Night Football and other television projects. The three decided to produce the film themselves, and after adding Line Producer, Carrie Holt de Lama, they traveled to Corbin to begin production.

The project was penned under the original title of Sight Unseen. The name 23 Blast was decided on at a dinner the producers attended. The name was drawn out of a hat, to which the producers agreed.

=== Filming ===
23 Blast began shooting on April 2, 2012. Filming took place in Corbin, Kentucky, and lasted 23 days. Scenes were filmed at locations from Freeman's childhood, ranging from Corbin High School to his church. Filming was completed one day ahead of schedule.

Game sequences were filmed at night, causing extras to stay over night. The producers utilized local football players, many of whom attended the local university, the University of the Cumberlands. These players would often leave set at 5:30 AM to attend weight training by 6 AM. The Cincinnati Bulldogs, a Semi Pro Football Team from Cincinnati, Ohio, did the actual live hits for the movie.

A scene of the Freemans at church was added late and, upon request of the actual Freeman family, was shot at their church, Central Baptist Church.

== Inspiration ==
23 Blast was inspired by the life of Travis Freeman, a Corbin, Kentucky native, who, at the age of twelve began having severe headaches. and a sinus infection, referred to as Cavernous Sinus Thrombosis. Soon after, his eyes swelled and became infected. His subsequent surgery was successful, but resulted in his blindness. He initially sought a support role on the Corbin Redhounds football team, but was assigned as a center on the roster. He played football all four years of high school. Travis attended the University of Kentucky, where he was offered a position on the team's support staff. In 1999, the High School Athletic Hall of Fame presented Travis with the first-ever Travis Freeman Award in recognition of his accomplishments.

"23 Blast" is the name of a football play, in which the quarterback hands off to the running back, who attempts to go through a hole in the defensive line. In the 1967 UCLA vs. USC football game, "23 Blast" was the audible run play for O. J. Simpson's 64 yard game-winning touchdown.

The filmmakers acknowledge being greatly influenced by movies such as Hoosiers, Rudy and Remember the Titans.

== Reception ==
23 Blast received mixed reviews from critics. Film review aggregator Rotten Tomatoes gave the film a rating of 38%, based on 21 reviews, with an average score of 4.9/10. The site's consensus reads, "The real life story that inspired 23 Blast is undeniably heartwarming — but the movie itself is too predictable and amateurish to recommend." Metacritic, another review aggregator, assigned the film a weighted average score of 45 out of 100, based on 10 critics, indicating "mixed or average" reviews.

23 Blast debuted at the Heartland Film Festival in 2013. It was the winner of the 2013 Heartland Film Festival's Audience choice Award for Narrative Feature. In 2014, 23 Blast was featured at several private screenings throughout the United States in front of test audiences. 23 Blast released in select theaters on October 23, 2014, and nationwide on October 24, 2014.

Super Bowl Winning Coach and All Pro Dad National spokesman, Tony Dungy said, “23 Blast is a powerful movie about football and perseverance." In an interview with Travis Freeman and Dylan Baker on The Huckabee Show, Arkansas Governor Mike Huckabee said, “If you only see one film between now and the end of the year, go see 23 Blast.”

== See also ==
- List of American football films
