= Mart Green =

American businessman

Mart Green is the founder and CEO of Mardel Christian & Education and of Every Tribe Every Nation, and an heir to the Hobby Lobby family of companies founded by his father David Green.

Mart Green's chain of Christian stores, Mardel, has 37 stores in seven US states and is headquartered in Oklahoma City. It is part of the Hobby Lobby group of companies.

== Film making ==
Every Tribe Entertainment (ETE) has released two films: Beyond the Gates of Splendor, a 2002 documentary, and End of the Spear, a 2005 adventure drama, both about the 1956 killing of five missionaries in Ecuador. ETE's producer is Bill Ewing and director is Jim Hanon, a first-time director. The film company's total budget for start up costs and its first two movies was around $20 million.

Mart's son, Brent Green has also taken up the art of film with his company Toy Gun Films, which produced the films En Tus Manos and Paper Flower.

In 2011 EthnoGraphic Media released the film Little Town of Bethlehem—a documentary about three men and their mission to find a peaceful resolution to the Israeli–Palestinian conflict—directed by Jim Hanon and produced by Mart Green. The film is a "sympathetic portrayal of the Palestinian cause". Pro-Israel activists were dismayed that the documentary was shown on hundreds of college campuses. David Brog, executive director of Christians United for Israel, lamented that the film would convince "young people that Israel is the greatest evil of our time".

Green is a member of the board of directors of the Come and See Foundation, a 501(c)(3) organization created to assist with the funding of the historical character drama TV series The Chosen.

== Oral Roberts University ==
Green pledged a $70 million gift in November 2007 to Oral Roberts University (ORU), enough to retire much of the university's debt, on the condition that the university show good governance. Of the $70 million that was pledged, he gave an immediate $8 million during the November 2007 board meeting. The remaining balance of the $70 million was given later. Upon an agreement with the University, Green became the new Chairman of the Board at ORU and a majority of the Board of Trustees was replaced.

In January 2009, Green and his family gave an additional gift of $10 million to ORU for campus renovations. In January 2009, Green also announced the ORU Board of Trustees selection of Mark Rutland as ORU President. In December 2010, ORU announced that the Green family would make another $10 million gift in 2011, to be used for renovations and technology improvements. The gift raised the Greens' total donations to ORU to $110 million.

== Family ==
His father David Green is founder and CEO of the arts and crafts retailer Hobby Lobby, and Mart sits on the board of directors. His younger brother Steve Green is the President of Hobby Lobby, patron of the Green Collection and founder of the Museum of the Bible in Washington, D.C., which opened in November 2017.

Green has been married for more than 30 years to his wife, Diana. The couple has four now adult children: Brent, Amy, Tyler, and Scott, and have four grandchildren.
