= GEB Network =

Christian satellite television network

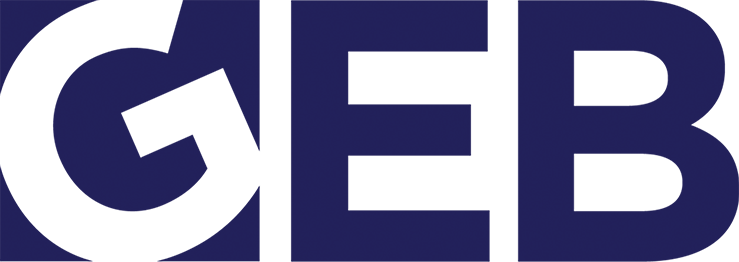
- Type: Religious broadcasting
- Country: United States
- Broadcast area: Nationwide
- Headquarters: Tulsa, Oklahoma, U.S.

Programming
- Language: English

Ownership
- Owner: Oral Roberts University
- Key people: Charles Scott (VP ORU); David Groves (General Manager)

History
- Launched: January 24, 1996
- Founder: Oral Roberts
- Former names: Golden Eagle Broadcasting (1996–2012); GEB America (2012–2019)

Links
- Website: www.geb.tv

GEB Network (formerly known as Golden Eagle Broadcasting and GEB America) is an American digital satellite television network, which airs primarily Christian and family programming. Oral Roberts founded it in 1996. GEB is owned by Oral Roberts University and is headquartered in Tulsa, Oklahoma.

== History ==
On January 24, 1996, KWMJ TV 53 Tulsa began airing with 24-hour programming. The launch of KWMJ included programs such as Oral Roberts's Chronicles of Faith, which was a 30-minute program showing footage from his tent crusades and the Oral Roberts University Chapel. The first live chapel aired on January 26, 1996.

On November 1, 1998, Golden Eagle Broadcasting was picked up by stations and viewers across the country and the world via television and the internet. By November 29, 1999, KWMJ became KGEB, the flagship affiliate of Golden Eagle Broadcasting. In 2003, KGEB launched a digital channel, KGEB-DT.

== Programming ==
GEB provides Christian and what it describes as family-friendly programming, with programs such as:

- The 700 Club
- Adventures in Dry Gulch
- Andrew Wommack
- Being Your Best With Trey Johnson
- Campmeeting
- Christ the Healer
- Creflo Dollar – Changing Your World
- Christian Music Countdown
- David Jeremiah
- David Lombardi
- Deborah Sweetin
- Donkey Ollie
- Drenda: With Drenda Keesee
- Dr. Robert Jeffress - Pathway to Victory
- Gary Keesee: Fixing the Money Thing
- Hellen Thomas
- In Touch With Charles Stanley
- International Fellowship of Christians and Jews
- Life Today with James Robison
- Jerusalem Dateline
- The Jewish Jesus
- Jewish Voice with Jonathan Bernis
- Joel Osteen
- John Muratori
- Joseph Prince
- Joyce Meyer Enjoying Everyday Life
- K.I.C.K.S. Club
- Les Feldick
- Lift Up Jesus With Dudley Rutherford
- Love a Child
- Manna-Fest with Perry Stone
- Dr. Maureen Anderson
- Mark Hankins
- NASA X
- Pastor Robert Morris Ministries
- ORU Chapel
- ORU Commencement (Annually)
- Sarah Ann Speaks Tips
- Sid Roth's It's Supernatural
- Super Book
- That You Might Have Life with Dr. Lynn Hiles
- The Gospel Truth with Andrew Wommack
- The Word For Living
- Throne Room Prayer
- Today With Marilyn and Sarah Marilyn Hickey
- Victory with Pastor Paul
- World Impact with Billy Wilson

=== Original programming ===
GEB Network also airs original programming. Through the years, the network has partnered with Oral Roberts University to air several university specials. Since 2008, ORU men's basketball games have been featured on the network. From 2011 to 2013, The Gathering at ORU aired on GEB with special appearances from pastors and ministry leaders including Dr. Steve Munsey, Clifton Taulbert, and Psalmist Judy Jacobs. The ORU Christmas Joy concert experience aired on GEB in 2011 and 2012. Another ministry special, ORU Ignite, featuring Dr. Charles Stanley, Billy Wilson, Mark Rutland, Jentezen Franklin, and more aired in summer 2013.

In 2010, GEB partnered with Empowered21 to produce and air their inaugural global conference, which was recorded in the Mabee Center.

In wake of the Moore, Oklahoma, tornado, GEB and Oral Roberts University met the victims and partners at Convoy of Hope to help provide relief. The stories were captured on GEB America Special Moore, Oklahoma, Tornado on May 24, 2013.

GEB's digital channel, KGEB-DT, also airs original programming, including the United States Army Field Band in April 2012, the US congressional debate in October 2012, and YBC Lasting Legacies series in 2019.

In February 2017. GEB began broadcasting Oral Roberts University baseball home games.

== Executives ==
Dr. Charles Scott is V.P of External Affairs for Oral Roberts University. David Groves is the General Manager. Bill Lee, is the Director of Engineering.

== Charitable and humanitarian initiatives ==
GEB offers internships for ORU and other college students.

In 2012, GEB (GEB America at the time) partnered with Convoy of Hope to provide relief to Hurricane Sandy victims.

On May 20, 2013, Moore, Oklahoma and surrounding areas were devastated by the violent 2013 Moore tornado. GEB partnered with ORU and Convoy of Hope to help relieve Oklahomans in need. GEB America also was instrumental in getting the story out nationwide via their television network.

== Headquarters ==
GEB studios are headquartered in Tulsa, Oklahoma at the Mabee Center on the Oral Roberts University campus. Over the years programs like Big 12 Conference This Week in Big 12, Deborah Sweetin, Hellen Thomas, YBC Lasting Legacies, and World Impact with Dr. Billy Wilson, have been recorded on-site in various studios. The Mabee Center and GEB have partnered together several times for special events. On October 13, 2013, GEB was a sponsor at the Oklahoma Music Hall of Fame. The Mabee Center was one of the members that were inducted into the 2013 class.

== Terrestrial affiliates ==
GEB Network programming is carried on KGEB in Tulsa, Oklahoma and as a subchannel of other TV stations (mostly low powered):

- KAZQ 32.4, Albuquerque, New Mexico
- KBPX-LD 46.5, Houston, Texas
- KIFR 49.2, Fresno, California
- WBNM-LD 50.7, Louisville, Kentucky
- WWYA-LD 28.4, Greenville, South Carolina
- WJDE-CD 31.8, Nashville, Tennessee

=== Former affiliates ===
- KDVD-LD 50.5, Phoenix, Arizona
- KRET-CD 45.7, Palm Springs, California
- W36EX-D 36.1, St. Louis, Missouri
- WACX 55.3, Orlando, Florida
- WCSN-LD 31.12, Columbus, Ohio
- WDKT-LD 31.1, Greenville, South Carolina
- WEZK-LD 28.7, Knoxville, Tennessee
- WLFG 68.9, Grundy, Virginia
- WSJT-LD 15.2, Atlantic City, New Jersey

== Awards and recognition ==
In 2013, the National Religious Broadcasters Association nominated GEB Network for two awards at the 2014 NRB Media Awards. GEB won the Best TV Public Service Announcement and was also nominated for Station of the Year.

In 2016, the National Religious Broadcasters Association awarded KGEB the TV Station of the Year.
