= William Moseley (actor) =

British actor (born 1987)

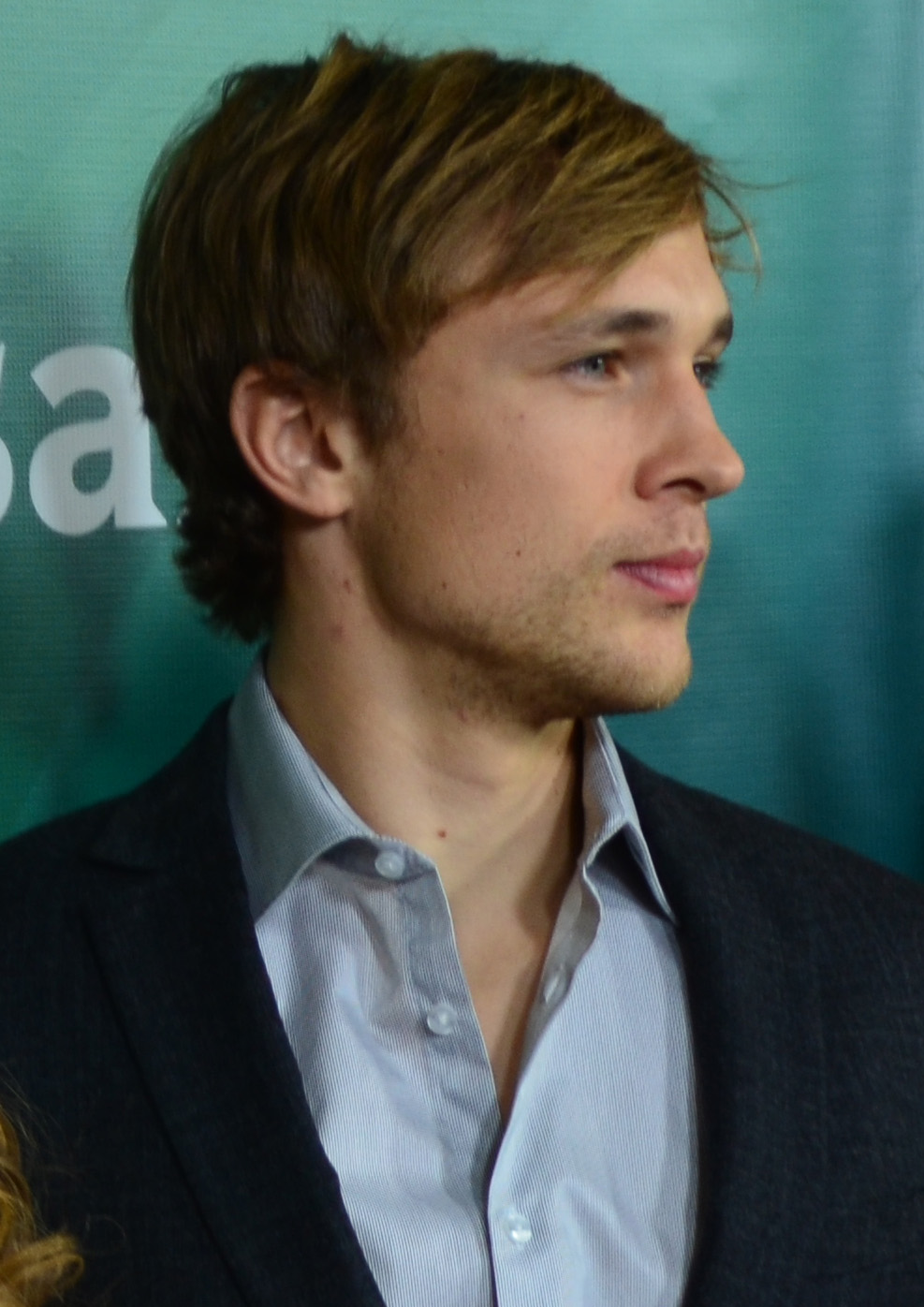
- Moseley at the 2015 Television Critics Association's Press Tour
- Born: William Peter Moseley; 27 April 1987 (age 39); Sheepscombe, Gloucestershire, England
- Occupations: Actor; acting coach
- Years active: 1997–present

William Peter Moseley (born 27 April 1987) is an English actor. He is known for his portrayal of Peter Pevensie in The Chronicles of Narnia (2005–2010) trilogy, which won him a Kids' Choice Award, in addition to nominations for a Saturn Award and a Young Artist Award. He also played Prince Liam in the E! series The Royals (2015–2018).

== Early life ==
Moseley was born on 27 April 1987 in the Cotswolds village of Sheepscombe, Gloucestershire. William has two younger siblings (a brother and a sister). Daisy Elizabeth Moseley was born in 1989 and Benjamin Hugh Moseley was born in 1992. He is the son of Juliette E. (née Fleming) and Peter A. Moseley, a cinematographer. Moseley attended Sheepscombe Primary School from September 1991 to July 1998, and then continued his education at Wycliffe College, also taking time off at Downfield Sixth Form, Stroud.

== Career ==
Moseley began his career as an extra on the television film Cider with Rosie in 1998, when he was 11 years old. Several years later, casting director Pippa Hall who'd worked with him on Cider With Rosie recommended him for the role of Peter Pevensie in the fantasy film The Chronicles of Narnia: The Lion, the Witch and the Wardrobe; eighteen months later, Moseley officially won the role and was cast. A blockbuster feature, the film was well received by both critics and audiences. For his performance, Moseley earned nominations for the Saturn Award for Best Actor and the Young Artist Award for Best Performance in a Feature Film (Comedy or Drama) – Leading Young Actor. Moseley reprised the role of Peter in the 2008 sequel, The Chronicles of Narnia: Prince Caspian, which earned positive reviews from critics, though it was not as commercially successful as its predecessor. For Prince Caspian, Moseley won Favorite Male Film Star from the Nickelodeon Kids' Choice Awards. He also earned a second Young Artist Award nomination, in the category of Best Cast. Moseley reprised the role of Peter a third time with a cameo in 2010's The Chronicles of Narnia: The Voyage of the Dawn Treader, despite the character's absence from the book of the same name. The Voyage of the Dawn Treader did not meet the same critical success as The Chronicles of Narnia's first two installments, although it did financially well in comparison to Prince Caspian.

In 2013, Moseley starred as Daniel Lombardi in the action thriller film Run alongside Kelsey Chow. In 2014, Moseley played Anderl Gruber in the adventure drama The Silent Mountain, which follows a young Austrian soldier in World War I who fights his way through the Alps to rescue his first love and escape the impending explosion that will rock the mountain.

In 2015, he played the role of Jared in the movie Margarita with a Straw. Later that year, he was cast as Prince Liam in the E! original series The Royals alongside Elizabeth Hurley and Alexandra Park. Describing the role, Moseley stated that "it's like (if) Prince Harry was thrown into being the next King of England. He basically is sort of a rebel ... doesn't really care what anybody thinks, does whatever he wants to do, when he wants to do it." The Royals earned mixed reviews, although Moseley and the ensemble's acting were acclaimed. In 2016, Moseley starred as Tyler in the horror thriller film Friend Request, directed by Simon Verhoeven. He then starred as Arden Lowe in the Lifetime movie My Sweet Audrina based on a novel by V.C. Andrews. He has joined the Stand Up to Cancer programme "Change the Odds", which features many other young actors. Moseley recently portrayed Aysel in the Brent Ryan Green film The Veil.

In 2018, Moseley appeared in the Australian biographical adventure film, In Like Flynn, alongside actors Corey William Large and Clive Standen. He also starred as Cam Harrison in the fantasy drama film The Little Mermaid alongside Poppy Drayton. In 2021, Moseley starred as the main character in the music video for The Living Tombstone's "Long Time Friends". That same year, Moseley starred alongside Johanna Braddy in the independent film Saving Paradise, where he played the role of Michael Peterson, a Wall Street investment banker, directed by Jay Silverman and written by Van Billet.

== Personal life ==
Moseley dated actress Kelsey Asbille from 2012 to 2018, his co-star in the film Run. While filming 2014's The Silent Mountain, Moseley was badly injured when struck by lightning while on set. As a result, he has a scar on his biceps.

== Filmography ==
=== Film ===
Year	Title	Role	Notes
2005	The Chronicles of Narnia: The Lion, the Witch and the Wardrobe	Peter Pevensie	
2008	The Chronicles of Narnia: Prince Caspian	Peter Pevensie	
2010	The Chronicles of Narnia: The Voyage of the Dawn Treader	Peter Pevensie	Cameo
2011	Don Cheadle is Captain Planet	Wheeler	Short
2012	Partition	Cameron Ainsworth	Short
2013	Run	Daniel Lombardi	
2014	The Silent Mountain	Anderl Gruber	
2014	The Stowaway	Gerry Cross	Short
2014	Margarita with a Straw	Jared	
2016	Friend Request	Tyler	
2016	The Stranger	Young Man	Short
2016	Carrie Pilby	Cy	
2017	The Veil	Aysel	
2018	The Little Mermaid	Cam Harrison	
2018	In Like Flynn	Dook Adams	
2019	The Courier	Agent Bryant	
2020	Artemis Fowl	Italian Man	Cameo
2021	Saving Paradise	Michael Peterson	
2021	Land of Dreams	Mark	
2022	Medieval	Jaroslav	
2022	On the Line	Dylan	
2022	Raven's Hollow	Edgar Allan Poe	
2024	The Ballad of Davy Crockett	Davy Crockett	
2024	Murder Company	Sergeant Jim Southern	
2025	Home Sweet Home Rebirth	Jake	
2026	Hostage	Logan Marshall	
TBA	Dead and Breakfast †	TBA	Post-production
TBA	Once Upon a Royal Summer †	Prince Chris	Post-production

=== Television ===
Year	Title	Role	Notes
1998	Cider with Rosie	Boy	Television film
2002	Goodbye, Mr. Chips	Forrester	Television film; uncredited
2012	The Selection	Aspen Leger	Unsold television pilot
2012	American Ninja Warrior	Himself	Episode: "Southwest Qualifying Round: Part 1"
2012	Perception	Prince Karl of Hasse-Brandenberg	Episode: "Kilimanjaro"
2015–2018	The Royals	Prince Liam	Main role
2016	My Sweet Audrina	Arden Lowe	Television film
2020	Prop Culture	Himself	Episode: "Chronicles of Narnia: The Lion, Witch, and the Wardrobe"
2023	Christmas in Notting Hill	Graham Savoy	Television film
2025	Royal-Ish	Prince Henry	Television film

=== Video games ===
Year	Title	Voice role	Notes
2005	The Chronicles of Narnia: The Lion, the Witch and the Wardrobe	Peter Pevensie	
2008	The Chronicles of Narnia: Prince Caspian	Peter Pevensie	

=== Music videos ===
Year	Title	Artist
2012	"It Was Love, Now It's War"	Bonnie Paul
2021	"Long Time Friends"	The Living Tombstone

== Awards and nominations ==
Year	Association	Category	Work	Result
2006	Saturn Awards	Best Performance by a Younger Actor	The Chronicles of Narnia: The Lion, the Witch and the Wardrobe	Nominated
2006	CAMIE Awards	Best Performance in a Feature film – Young Ensemble Cast	The Chronicles of Narnia: The Lion, the Witch and the Wardrobe	Won
2006	Young Artist Awards	Best Performance in a Feature Film (Comedy or Drama) – Leading Young Actor	The Chronicles of Narnia: The Lion, the Witch and the Wardrobe	Nominated
2008	Nickelodeon UK Kids Choice Awards	Favourite Male Film Star	The Chronicles of Narnia: Prince Caspian	Won
2009	Young Artist Awards	Best Performance in a Feature Film – Young Ensemble Cast	The Chronicles of Narnia: Prince Caspian	Nominated
