= Paper Flowers =

Paper Flowers may refer to:

- Paper Flowers (1959 film), a Hindi film
- Paper Flowers (1977 film), a Mexican film
- "Paper Flowers" (song), by Alicia Keys from the album Keys
- Paper Flower (film), 2011 film directed and produced by Brent Ryan Green

== See also ==
- Paper flower (disambiguation)
