= William Levy (actor) =

Cuban-American actor (born 1980)

- Levy in 2026
- Born: William Gutiérrez Levy; August 29, 1980 (age 46); Cojímar, Havana, Cuba
- Citizenship: Cuba; United States
- Occupations: Actor; former model
- Years active: 2003–present
- Partner: Elizabeth Gutiérrez (2003–2024)
- Children: 2

William Gutiérrez Levy (born August 29, 1980) is a Cuban-American actor and former model.

== Early life and education ==
Levy was born in Cojimar, Cuba. Levy is of Spanish descent, his great-grandfather being from the Canary Islands. Although he is Catholic, his maternal grandfather was Jewish (the origin of his surname, Levy), he grew up in a non-religious household. He was raised by his single mother, Barbara Levy. His family, including his brother Jonathan Gutierrez Levy and sister Barbara Gutierrez Levy, emigrated to Miami, Florida when he was 14. He attended Barbara Goleman Senior high school, located in the suburb of Miami Lakes. After attending high school, he studied business administration on a baseball scholarship at St. Thomas University for two years. He later went to Los Angeles to study acting, and continued his acting studies in Miami and Mexico City.

== Career ==
Levy worked as a model for the Next Models agency, and was featured in two reality shows broadcast by Telemundo: Isla de la Tentación and Protagonistas de Novela 2. In 2005, he performed at the Centro de Bellas Artes in San Juan, Puerto Rico, starring in the play La Nena Tiene Tumbao.

His debut on the Spanish-language channel Univision was in the Venevision International production of Olvidarte Jamás. He later appeared in Mi Vida Eres Tu and Acorralada. In 2008, he appeared in his first film, Retazos de Vida, directed by Viviana Cordero. He was invited by television producer Carla Estrada to star in Pasión, his breakthrough in Mexican telenovelas. Televisa cast him as the lead in Cuidado con el Angel with actress and ex-RBD singer Maite Perroni. The show was first broadcast in Mexico in June 2008, and began airing in the United States in September 2008 on Univision. It averaged 5 million viewers per evening.

Levy starred alongside Jacqueline Bracamontes on Sortilegio in 2009. Sortilegio aired on Univision, and the finale drew 6.6 million viewers, beating ABC and CBS for viewers in that time slot. In November 2009, the actor lent his voice to the Spanish version of the animated movie Planet 51. The movie opened on November 27 in Mexico, and won an award for best animated Spanish-language film of 2009 at the Premios Goya. From November 2009 to February 2010, Levy toured several Mexican cities with the play Un Amante a la Medida, which toured in the United States in June 2010.

Levy starred in the Mexican telenovela Triunfo del Amor, a remake of the Venezuelan classic Cristal, again with Maite Perroni. The telenovela aired on El Canal de las Estrellas on October 25, 2010. Pedro Torres, executive producer of Mujeres Asesinas, confirmed Levy's role in the third season of the popular Mexican series. Levy starred as Jennifer Lopez's love interest in the music video "I'm Into You", from her album Love?. It aired on NBC's Today on May 2, 2011. Levy appeared on the cover of People en Español for its special issue on the sexiest men of the year for 2011.

In January 2012, it was announced that Levy would appear in two episodes of the VH1 television series Single Ladies, with Denise Vasi. He was a participant in the fourteenth season of Dancing with the Stars, with two-time mirror ball champion Cheryl Burke as his dance-pro partner; they finished in third place. In December 2012, Levy was cast as Captain Damian Fabre for the remake of La Tormenta titled La Tempestad which aired in 2013. Levy starred in Addicted, an erotic drama based on the novel of the same name by Zane. Variety named Levy one of the Top 10 Latino Actors and Actresses in Hollywood.

Levy co-starred in Tyler Perry's film The Single Moms Club (2014). In 2016, Levy made a transition into major Hollywood studio films, appearing alongside Milla Jovovich in the science fiction action film [[Resident Evil: The Final Chapter]], where he portrayed the character Christian, a survivor faction leader. Levy was cast in the lead role as Warrior in the Brent Ryan Green film The Veil (2017). In 2018, he played the role of Mateo Ferrera in the Fox musical drama series Star.

In 2021, Levy returned to telenovelas as Sebastián Vallejo in the new adaptation of Café con aroma de mujer, with Colombian actress-singer Laura Londoño. In 2023, Levy starred in a lead role and worked as executive producer in the Telemundo telenovela Vuelve a mí, with Samadhi Zendejas.

== Personal life ==
Levy is a naturalized United States citizen. He has been in an on-off relationship with Mexican-American actress Elizabeth Gutiérrez since 2003, and they have two children together, a son, Christopher Alexander, in 2006, and a daughter, Kailey Alexandra, on March 6, 2010. On July 11, 2009, Levy converted to Catholicism. In April 2024, Gutiérrez confirmed that she and Levy had parted ways after 20 years. On April 14, 2025 at 10:10 PM, Levy was arrested in the Miami area for disorderly intoxication in a public place causing disturbance and trespassing.

=== Name change ===
He was born as William Gutiérrez Levy. He got the idea for his name change from a friend of his parents who tried helping the family get out of Cuba while William's mother was still pregnant, as he told Entertainment Tonight. Levy is his mother's last name.

=== Nude photos ===
In May 2012, while competing on Dancing with the Stars, nude photos of Levy leaked. Levy responded by saying "I'm used to that already. [The photos] have been out already all over the world. I was a model when I did these things, so as a model there's nothing wrong [with] doing those kind[s] of things. You gotta work. You gotta make money".

== Activism ==
Levy is a philanthropist and donates his time to fix houses for low-income families in Mexico as part of the "Alianzas que Construyen" Televisa Foundation.

== Dancing with the Stars performances ==
Levy was announced to be a contestant on ABC's Dancing With The Stars partnering with two-time champion Cheryl Burke for season 14.

Week #	Dance/Song	Judges' score			Result
Week #	Dance/Song	Inaba	Goodman	Tonioli	Result
1	Cha-Cha-Cha/ "International Love"	8	8	8	No Elimination
2	Quickstep/ "Nice Work If You Can Get It"	9	7	9	Safe
3	Salsa/ "La Vida es un Carnaval"	9	9	10	Safe
4	Jive/ "We're Not Gonna Take It"	7	7	8	Safe
5	Argentine Tango/ "Buttons"	10	9	10	Safe
6	Rumba/ "Being with You"; Motown Marathon	9 Awarded	8; 9	10; Points	Safe
7	Viennese Waltz/ "Ave Maria"; Team Paso Doble/ "O Fortuna"	9; 9	9; 8	9; 9	Safe
8	Foxtrot/ "Stray Cat Strut"; Paso Doble (Trio Challenge)/ "Diablo Rojo"	10; 9	10; 9	10; 9	Safe
9 Semi-finals	Tango/ "Sweet Dreams (Are Made of This)"; Samba/ "Magalenha"	9; 10	9; 10	10; 10	Safe
10; Finals	Cha-Cha-Cha/ "Raise Your Glass"; Freestyle/ "Objection (Tango)"; Salsa (24-hour Challenge)/ Juventud de Presente	10; 10; 10	10; 9; 10	10; 10; 10	Third Place

== Filmography ==
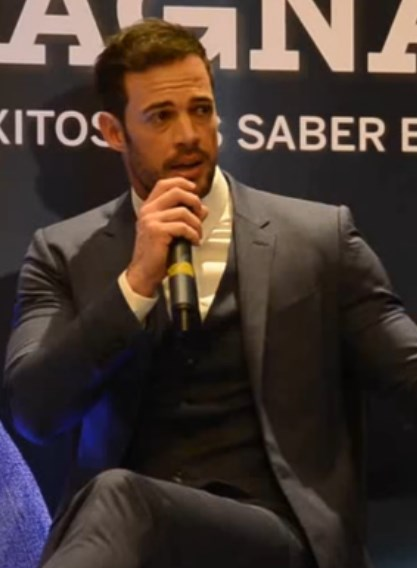
Levy in 2015

Film
Year	Title	Role	Notes
2008	Retazos de Vida	Thiago	All eyes on me
2009	Planet 51	Captain Charles "Chuck" Baker	Voice role
2014	The Single Moms Club	Manny	
2014	Addicted	Quinton Canosa	
2016	Term Life	Alejandro	
2016	Resident Evil: The Final Chapter	Christian	
2017	A Change of Heart	Carlos	
2017	The Veil	Warrior	Lead role
2017	Girls Trip	Himself	Cameo
2017	Cinderelo	Brando	
2018	El fantasma de mi novia	Chepa	Lead role
2019	En Brazos de un Asesino (Killing Sarai)	Victor Faust	Lead role
2021	South Beach Love	Tony Sanchez	Lead role
2025	Bajo Un Volcán	Mario Torres	Lead Role

Television
Year	Title	Role	Notes
2006	Mi vida eres tú	Federico	
2006	Olvidarte jamás	Germán Torre	
2007	Acorralada	Larry Irázabal	187 episodes
2007	Pasión	Vasco Darién	
2008	Plaza Sésamo	Himself	Episode: "El problemón"
2008–2009	Cuidado con el ángel	Juan Miguel San Román Bustos / Pablo Cisneros	Lead role; 194 episodes
2009	Sortilegio	Alejandro Lombardo	Lead role; 90 episodes
2010	Mujeres asesinas	Fonsi / Conde Alfonso de Jesús Ruiz Machado y Ortigoza	Episode: "Annette y Ana, Nobles"
2010-2011	Triunfo del amor	Maximiliano Sandoval	Lead role; 172 episodes
2012	Dancing with the Stars	Himself	Contestant
2012	Single Ladies	Antonio	4 episodes
2013	La Tempestad	Damián Fabré	Lead role; 122 episodes
2014	Miss Universe 2014	Judge	TV special
2018-2019	Star	Matteo Ferrera	Main role
2021	Café con aroma de mujer	Sebastián Vallejo	Lead role
2023	Montecristo	Alejandro Montecristo	Lead role Also producer
2023–2024	Vuelve a mí	Santiago Zepeda	Lead role Also producer
2025	Camino a Arcadia	Pablo / Mateo	Lead role Also producer

Music videos
Year	Artist	Title
2011	Jennifer Lopez	"I'm Into You"

== Theater ==
- Un amante a la medida (2009–10)

== Awards and nominations ==
=== Premios Bravo ===
Year	Category	Work	Result
2008	Best Newcomer	Pasión	Won
2010	Best Actor	Sortilegio	Won

=== Premios Juventud ===
Year	Category	Work	Result
2009	It's great!	Cuidado con el ángel	Won
2010	It's great!	Sortilegio	Won
2011	It's great!	Triunfo del amor	Won
2014	It's great!	La Tempestad	Won

=== Premios TVyNovelas ===
Year	Category	Work	Result
2010	Best Actor	Sortilegio	Nominated

=== Califa de oro ===
Year	Category	Work	Result
2012	Best Actor	Triunfo del amor	Won

=== Premios Casandra ===
Year	Category	Work	Result
2012	Revelation Image	Triunfo del amor	Won

=== People en Español ===
Year	Category	Work	Result
2009	Best Couple (with Maite Perroni)	Cuidado con el ángel	Nominated
2009	Mejor actor	Cuidado con el ángel	Nominated
2010	Best Actor	Sortilegio	Nominated
2010	Best Couple (with Jacqueline Bracamontes)	Sortilegio	Nominated
2010	The best dress of the year	William Levy	Nominated
2011	Best Couple (with Maite Perroni)	Triunfo del amor	Won
2011	Best Actor	Triunfo del amor	Nominated
2011	The best dress of the year	William Levy	Nominated
2012	King ofTwitter	William Levy	Nominated
2013	Best Actor	La Tempestad	Nominated
2013	Best Couple (with Ximena Navarrete)	La Tempestad	Nominated
2013	The sexiest Twitter	William Levy	Nominated
2013	William Levy, piloto de avión	William Levy	Nominated

== Lists ==
- 2011: He appeared in People en Español's list of the 50 handsomest men.
- 2009: People en Español named him as one of "Los 25 hombres más guapos".
- 2009: People en Español named him as one of "Los 50 más bellos".
- 2008: Quién named him as one of "Los 12 hombres más sexys".
- 2008: People en Español named him as one of "Los 50 más bellos".
- 2006: People en Español named him as one of "Los 20 solteros más sexys".
- 2006: People en Español named him as one of "Los 20 solteros más sexys".
