= Paper flower =

Paper flower may refer to:

- A type of artificial flower
- Bougainvillea, a plant
- Psilostrophe cooperi, a plant
- Paper Flower (film), a 2011 film directed and produced by Brent Ryan Green

== See also ==
- Paper Flowers (disambiguation)
