= Serinda Swan =

Canadian actress (born 1984)

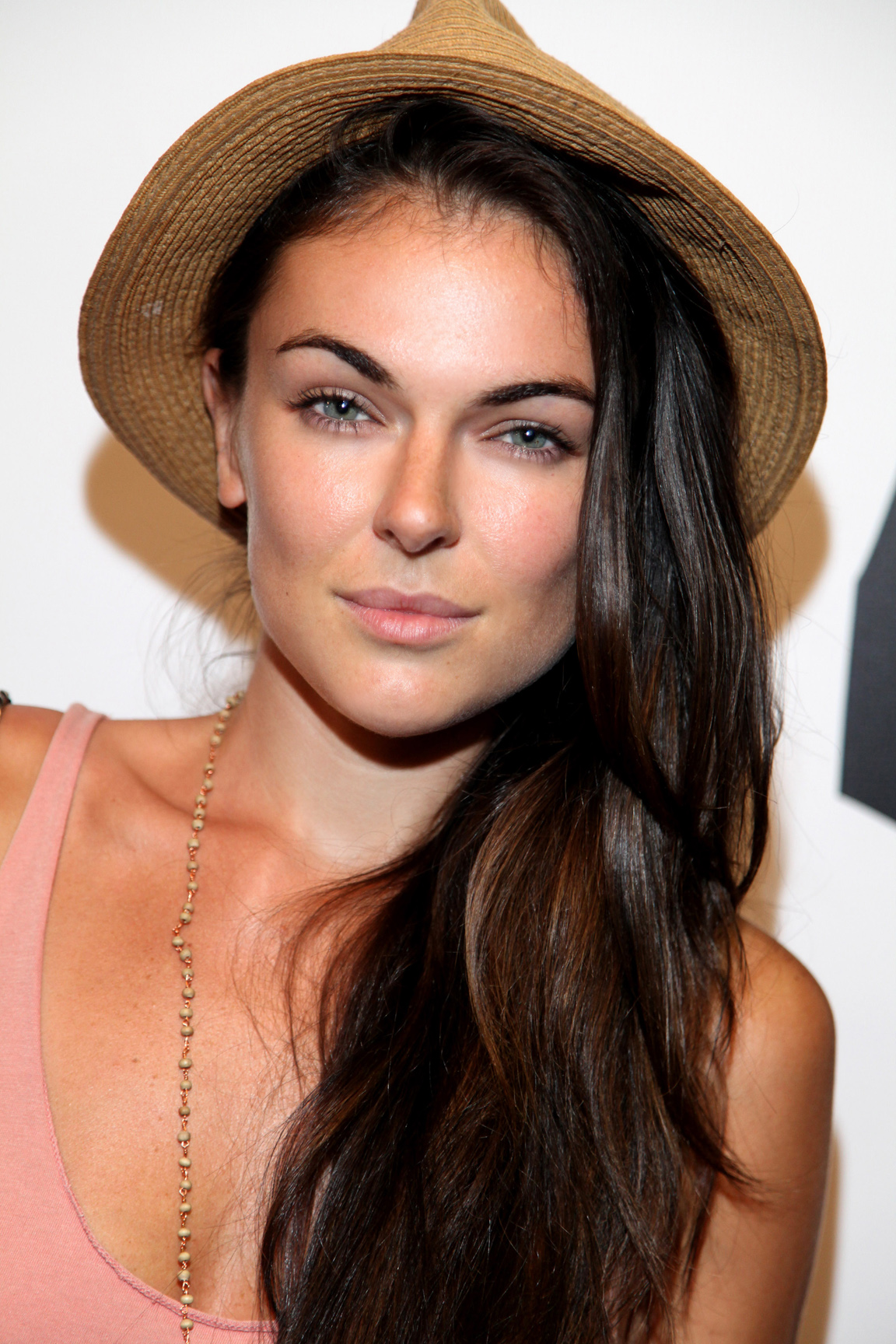
- Swan in 2012
- Born: July 11, 1984 (age 42); West Vancouver, British Columbia, Canada
- Occupation: Actress
- Years active: 2005–present

Serinda Swan (/sərɪndə/; born July 11, 1984) is a Canadian actress. She starred as Karla Dixon in the second season of the Amazon Prime Video series Reacher. From 2019 to 2022, she starred as Jenny Cooper in the CBC/CW crime drama series Coroner. In 2017, she starred in Marvel's Inhumans and HBO's Ballers, and also portrayed Anne Bancroft in the first season of Feud (2017). Previously, she guest starred on the WB/CW Superman prequel series Smallville as Zatanna Zatara, a DC Comics–inspired recurring character who is an actual magician. She also starred as Erica Reed in the A&E drama series Breakout Kings (2011–2012) and as Paige Arkin in the USA Network action drama series Graceland (2013–2015). She is the director and cofounder of an online education technology company called Blueprint Kids.

== Early life ==
Swan was born in West Vancouver, British Columbia, Canada. Her father, Scott Swan, is a Canadian theatre director and actor who runs an acting studio.

== Career ==
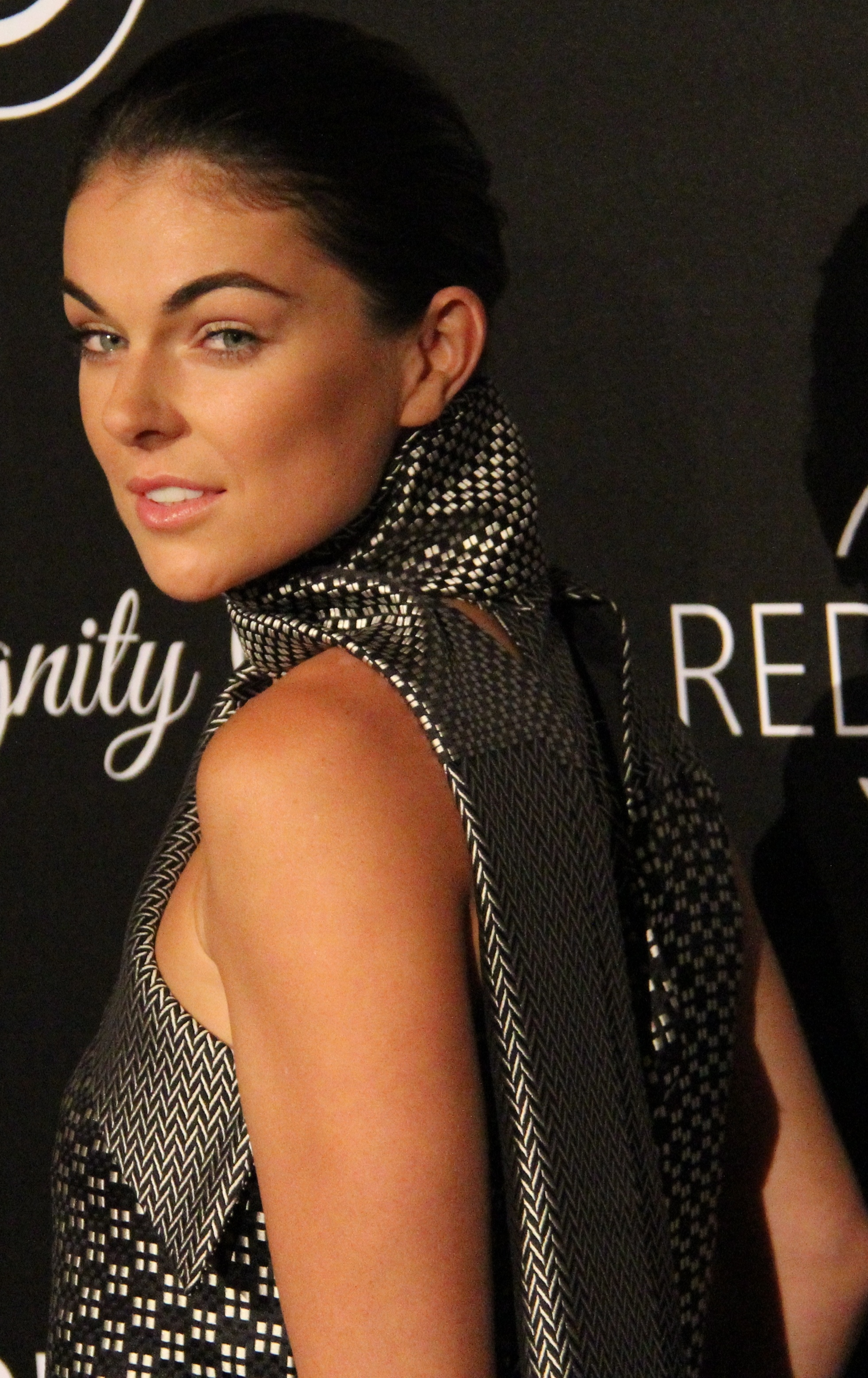
Serinda Swan at Redlight Traffic's inaugural Digital Gala in 2013

Her first acting job was in 1989, a small role in the Ted Danson and Isabella Rossellini film Cousins, when she was just five years old. One of her early on screen appearances as an adult was in Theory of a Deadman's music video for their single "So Happy", which was released in April 2008. Her first film credit was in 2009 in the romantic comedy The Break-Up Artist.

From 2009 to 2010, she appeared three times on The CW television series Smallville (in the season 8 episode "Hex", the season 9 episode "Warrior", and the season 10 episode "Icarus") as Zatanna Zatara. She also had the role of the Roman goddess, Veritas, in the season six episode "You Can't Handle the Truth" of Supernatural, another CW series, in 2010. In 2010's Tron: Legacy, she had the role of Siren #2.

From 2011 to 2012, Swan starred as Erica Reed in the A&E television series Breakout Kings. She shared that many of the prison scenes were shot in actual prisons, while real convicts are also there behind bars. The series was canceled on May 17, 2012.

Swan portrays Zera in the 2017 Brent Ryan Green film, The Veil. In March 2017, it was announced that Swan would portray Medusa in the ABC and Marvel Television series Inhumans. She starred on the series for one season, until 2018, when the series was canceled.

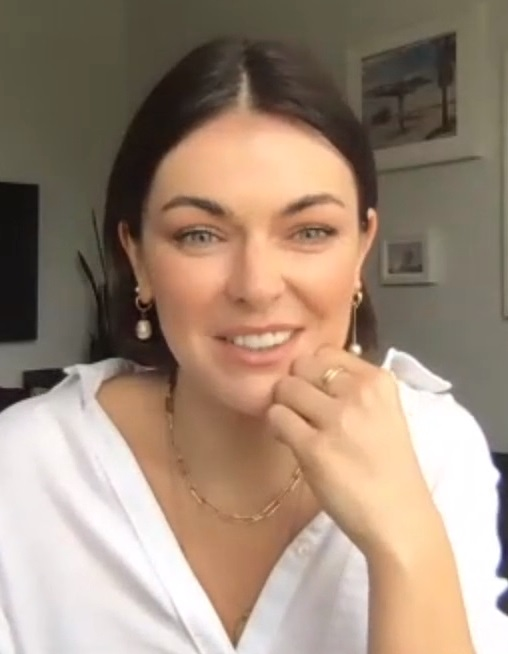
Serinda Swan interview for Redemption Day press release in 2021

In late 2018, it was announced that Swan would star as the lead of CBC's forthcoming television series Coroner, based on the Jenny Cooper series of novels by M. R. Hall. The series premiered in January 2019 and attracted one million viewers per episode throughout the first season. In June 2020, it was announced that American network The CW had picked up the show during the COVID-19 pandemic due to the lockdowns of production sets on its other shows, to fill primetime programming timeslots. The show premiered on August 5, 2020, and attracted over 600,000 viewers during each episode in the first season, and increased as the seasons continued for the network. After four seasons, in June 2022, it was announced that Swan would be leaving the show, and would be potentially replaced by a new actress or actor with a new main character as the lead role.

In September 2022, it was announced that she would be joining the cast for season 2 of the Amazon Prime Video series Reacher.

== Activism ==
Swan works with several charities including the Somaly Mam Foundation, United Nations Foundation's Nothing But Nets, and Heifer International. She is a Founding Ambassador for Friends to Mankind, which describes itself as a non-profit organization that works "with individuals, corporations, and humanitarian organizations for the betterment of humanity".

== Filmography ==
=== Film ===
Year	Title	Role	Notes
2005	Neal 'n' Nikki	Amanda	
2009	The Break-Up Artist	Ashley	
2010	Percy Jackson & the Olympians: The Lightning Thief	Aphrodite	
2010	Tron: Legacy	Siren #2	
2010	Random Walk		Short film
2011	Recoil	Darcy	
2011	Creature	Emily	
2012	Wake	Alex	Short film
2012	The Baytown Outlaws	Jez	
2014	Jinn	Jasmine Walker	
2014	My Sister	Melissa	
2015	Sentient	Heather	Short film
2016	Hit TV: The Prologue	Julia	Short film
2017	Crowbar Smile	Julia	Short film
2017	The Veil	Zera	
2017	Blood Ride	Maggie	Short film
2019	Shangri-La	Vera Thompson	Short film
2020	Revenge Ride	Maggie	
2021	Redemption Day	Kate Paxton	
2021	Honey	Billie	Short film
2022	Devotion	Elizabeth Taylor	

=== Television ===
Year	Title	Role	Notes
2006	Supernatural	Hospital Receptionist	Episode: "Salvation"
2007	Exes and Ohs	Lucianne	Episode: "What Goes Around"
2007	Blood Ties	Young Woman	Episode: "Heart Of Ice"
2008	Loch Ness Terror	Caroleena	Television film
2008	Psych	Eileen Mazwell	Episode: "Murder?... Anyone?... Anyone?... Bueller?"
2009	Desperate Escape	Melissa	Television film
2009	Hostile Makeover	Amanda Manville	Television film
2009	Trust	Tiffany	Television film
2009–2010	Smallville	Zatanna	Recurring role; 3 episodes
2010	Supernatural	Veritas / Ashley Frank	Episode: "You Can't Handle the Truth"
2011	Hawaii Five-0	Alana	Episode: "Ho'ohuli Na'au"
2011–2012	Breakout Kings	Erica Reed	Main role; 22 episodes
2013	Republic of Doyle	Patti Middlebrooks	Episode: "Missing"
2013–2015	Graceland	Paige Arkin	Main role; 37 episodes
2014	Graceland Insider	Paige Arkin	2 episodes
2014	The Tomorrow People	Cassandra Smythe	Episodes: "Things Fall Apart" & "Endgame"
2014	Chicago Fire	Brittany Baker	Recurring role; 4 episodes
2017	Feud: Bette and Joan	Anne Bancroft	Episode: "And the Winner Is... (The Oscars of 1963)"
2017	Ballers	Chloe	Recurring role; 6 episodes
2017	Inhumans	Medusa	Main role; 8 episodes
2018	Robot Chicken	Leslie / Katara	Voice role; episode: "He's Not Even Aiming at the Toilet"
2020	The Twilight Zone	Ellen Lowell	Episode: "Downtime"
2019–2022	Coroner	Jenny Cooper	Main role; 38 episodes and also executive producer (season 4)
2023–2024	Reacher	Karla Dixon	Main role; 8 episodes
