= David Green (entrepreneur) =

American businessman (born 1941)

- Born: November 13, 1941 (age 84); Emporia, Kansas, US
- Known for: Founder of Hobby Lobby
- Spouse: Barbara Green
- Children: 3, including Mart

David Green (born November 13, 1941) is an American businessman and the founder of Hobby Lobby, a chain of arts and crafts stores. He is a major financial supporter of Evangelical organizations in the United States and funded the Museum of the Bible in Washington, D.C.

== Career ==
In 1970, while a store manager with variety store chain TG&Y, Green took a $600 loan and started a home business in his garage assembling and selling miniature picture frames, with a partner, Larry Pico. The business, Greco Products, capitalized on a decorating fad of the time. Eventually, Green bought out Pico and staffed a small factory with people with cerebral palsy, paying ten cents per frame. By August 1972, the focus was on arts and crafts, and the business had thrived to such an extent that Green and his wife were able to open a 300 square-foot store in northwest Oklahoma City called Hobby Lobby. In 1975, Green left his 13-year career with TG&Y and opened a second Hobby Lobby location with 6,000 square feet of space.

In 2017, Green and co-author Bill High published Giving It All Away...And Getting It All Back Again, which discusses Green's belief that tithing secures God's protection and highlights God's focus on future generation, an aspect of prosperity theology.

== Personal life ==
Green grew up in Altus, Oklahoma, where his father was a Christian pastor with a congregation of 35. All five of his siblings are pastors or pastors' wives. He asserts that he has built his business on biblical principles. Green is very supportive of Christian organizations, and is one of the largest individual donors to Evangelical causes in the United States. Green commits half of Hobby Lobby's total pretax earnings to a portfolio of evangelical ministries, and as of 2012, he had donated an estimated $500 million. Green has taken a public stance against the Patient Protection and Affordable Care Act (Obamacare) because of its inclusion of a provision mandating that companies include the "morning-after pill" in their health coverage. He sued the federal government in Burwell v. Hobby Lobby Stores, Inc., overturning the mandate to provide that medication.

Green lives in southwest Oklahoma City with his wife, Barbara. Hobby Lobby is owned by them and their three children. The eldest son, Mart Green, is the founder and CEO of the Mardel Christian & Education book store and Every Tribe Entertainment. Steve Green is president of Hobby Lobby, as well as founder and primary funder of the Museum of the Bible, and patron of the Green Collection. Daughter Darsee Lett is Creative Director for the Hobby Lobby stores.

== Museum of the Bible ==
Green funded the Museum of the Bible in Washington, D.C. at the cost of $500 million. In 2017, U.S. Immigration and Customs Enforcement announced that they had returned 3,800 ancient artifacts found in the Hobby Lobby warehouse to the Republic of Iraq. In 2020, an additional 11,500 artifacts were returned to Egypt and Iraq. Also a large number of papyrus fragments purported to be part of the Dead Sea Scrolls were revealed to be forgeries.

In July 2020, Forbes magazine reported the museum had received between $2 million and $5 million from the Paycheck Protection Program to retain 249 jobs (a calculated annual average salary between $38,000 and $97,000). In a statement to the magazine, a museum spokesperson said that the “Museum of the Bible applied for and received a PPP loan to pay our employees while the museum had to stay closed, taking in no other revenue."

== David & Barbara Green Centre for Global Leadership ==
In September 2026, Oral Roberts University in Tulsa, Oklahoma, unvelied the David & Barbara Green Centre for Global Leadership, named after Green and his wife. The university calls it a "nexus for strategic leadership development and empowerment". The centre includes a virtual lecture theatre, lecture hall, and conference rooms and classrooms made to host seminars, workshops, and continued education programming.
