= Mark Rutland =

American missionary and university president

3rd President of Oral Roberts University
- In office July 1, 2009 – 2012
- Preceded by: Richard Roberts; Ralph Fagin (acting)
- Succeeded by: William M. Wilson

Personal details
- Born: November 5, 1947 (age 78) Commerce, Texas, US
- Spouse: Alison Rutland
- Children: Travis Rutland, two daughters
- Education: University of Maryland, College Park; Emory University; California Graduate School of Theology
- Profession: missionary evangelist
- Website: National Institute of Christian Leadership

Mark Rutland (born November 5, 1947) is a missionary, evangelist, ordained minister of the International Ministerial Fellowship, and founder of Global Servants, formerly known as the Trinity Foundation. and the House of Grace. He was the third president of Oral Roberts University in Tulsa, Oklahoma. Prior to his election as president of Oral Roberts University, Rutland served as the president of Southeastern University of the Assemblies of God in Lakeland, Florida, from 1999 to 2009. Additionally he has served as pastor of Calvary Assembly of God in Orlando, Florida, and as an Associate Pastor at Mount Paran Church of God in Atlanta, Georgia. Global Servants is an organization centered on missions and evangelism around the world. The House of Grace is a home for tribal girls threatened by sexual slavery in Chiang Rai City, Thailand. He also has a thirty-minute syndicated radio program titled Herald of Joy. Rutland is married to Alison Rutland (née Permenter) and has three children.

== Early life ==
Rutland was born in Commerce, Texas but grew up and was raised throughout the southeastern United States, including Florida and Georgia, until finally coming of age in Maryland. He met his future wife, Alison, in his junior year of high school, where she was a member of the cheerleading squad. Upon graduation from high school, Rutland entered the University of Maryland, College Park initially to earn a degree in public relations and to pursue a career in politics (Rutland, 1987 p. 2). Eventually, however, he began to pursue a career in Christian ministry and upon graduation from the University of Maryland, he enrolled in the Candler School of Theology at Emory University. Rutland credits this change in direction to several supernatural experiences that took place in his youth. He became a born-again Christian while attending an evangelical youth camp in Blue Lake, Alabama, and it was there that Rutland believes to have received a mandate from God calling him to be a preacher (Rutland, 1987 p. 4). Some years later, his wife Alison, also a born-again Christian, indicated that she too had received a word from God that Rutland was to become a minister and it is his wife's confirmation that he credited as the deciding factor in his decision to abandon his dreams of politics and pursue a life of ministry.

Upon completion of study at Emory University, Rutland's first assignment was at the Little River United Methodist Church in Woodstock, Georgia (Rutland 1987, p. 8). Later, he became a pastor at Oak Grove United Methodist Church in Atlanta, Georgia. During his tenure at Oak Grove, Rutland claims that his marriage was disintegrating and that he attempted suicide. (Rutland, 1987 p. 16). It was at a "Conference on Power for Ministry Today" held at a Ramada Inn in Atlanta, Georgia in December 1975, that Rutland was baptized in the Holy Spirit as evidenced by speaking in other tongues (Rutland, 1987 p. 23). Rutland credits this experience as the real turning point in his life (Rutland, 1987 p. 23).

== Missions work ==
After his experience in 1975, Rutland began preaching at revivals and conferences in a number of churches and it was during this period that he believes God began calling him to the mission field. His first mission was to Mexico in 1977 where he worked with American missionary couple Jim and Helen Mann in the village of Laborcitas (Rutland, 1987 p. 51–53). While Rutland undertook many other missions to Mexico, his foray into missions did not begin in earnest until 1979 when, after he believed he had received a revelation that God would be sending him all over the world to carry out missions, he traveled to Ghana (Rutland, 1987 p. 77). Initially, Rutland was forced to wait in London, England, for several days as Accra Airport, Ghana was closed as a result of an attempted coup on May 15, 1979 by forces loyal to future leader of Ghana, Flight Lieutenant Jerry Rawlings.

Rutland's mission to Ghana in 1979 consisted of a 28-day crusade in which he preached in many places and churches throughout the country, including the cities of Accra and Kumasi. In Kumasi, he worked a great deal with a man named Brew Riverson, the president of the small Methodist training college in the city (Wesley College) and whom he had become acquainted with several years before at a rally he had held in Atlanta, Georgia.

In the following years, Rutland carried out many other evangelistic missions to many countries, including Ghana, Nigeria, India, Benin, Colombia, Peru, Thailand, and Mexico (Rutland, 1987). It was also during this time that he founded the Trinity Foundation, later renamed Global Servants. Originally intended to be an evangelistic organization operating within the United States, Global Servants became an evangelistic missions association that has carried out operations all over the world, from the founding of bible training schools in many different countries to the founding of the House of Grace in Chiang Rai City, Thailand, in 1988. The House of Grace was started as a place of refuge for young ethnic Akha girls at risk of becoming ensnared in the lucrative Southeast Asian sex slave trade.

== Later pastoral work ==
In 1987, Rutland was invited by the senior pastor of Mount Paran Church of God in Atlanta, Georgia, to serve as an Associate Pastor for a period of two years. After completing his two years at Mount Paran, Rutland took the helm of the financially struggling and leaderless Calvary Assembly of God in Orlando, Florida, in 1990.

When Rutland arrived at Calvary, the church was reeling from the effects of a financial crisis (bankruptcy was thought to be inevitable), a sexual scandal, and drastically reduced membership. During Rutland's leadership of Calvary Assembly of God from 1990 to 1995, he oversaw the reduction in the church's debt by $4 million from $15 million. Calvary was among the largest Assembly of God congregations in the United States and during Rutland's leadership of the church, attendance increased from 1,800 to 3,600.

== President of Southeastern University ==
In 1999, Rutland was asked to become the new president of Southeastern University of the Assemblies of God in Lakeland, Florida At that time, Southeastern University was struggling financially, facing many maintenance issues, and was suffering from declining enrollment. In the ten years since he took over the institution, Southeastern transitioned to become a full university and experienced greater than a tripling in its enrollment, increasing from around 1,000 to greater than 3,000. As well, more than $50 million has been invested in various construction and renovation projects on campus, including new dormitories, a new cafeteria, administrative offices, a fitness center and a bookstore.

== President of Oral Roberts University ==
On January 28, 2009, the board of trustees of Oral Roberts University in Tulsa, Oklahoma, elected Rutland as the third president of the institution. Rutland's selection came about after he was recommended by the university's presidential search committee to the board of trustees. The committee had been formed following the resignation of the school's former president, evangelist and son of the institution's namesake, Richard Roberts, in 2007. Roberts' resignation came on the heels of a financial scandal and a wrongful termination lawsuit filed by several former faculty members of the university, as well as numerous claims of misuse of funds and impropriety directed against his wife, Lindsay Roberts. Rutland's election marks the first time in the history of Oral Roberts University that a person not a member of the Roberts family has held the office of president.

Rutland was selected from a pool of more than 130 applicants to lead the university and he assumed the office of president on July 1, 2009, taking the reins of the institution from Interim President Dr. Ralph Fagin, who was appointed to the position following the resignation of Richard Roberts in 2007. Although Oral Roberts was not personally involved with the selection process, Rutland is reportedly the only person he seriously considered to take over the presidency of the university. Rutland initially told ORU he was not interested in the position, and would not even submit a resume, but was eventually persuaded to accept the post by ORU board chairman Mart Green. According to an Associated Press report, Rutland would make a yearly salary of $275,000. Rutland stated that his main goals as president would be to expand the university's enrollment, as well as work to restore trust between the university and the public with a "level of transparency, authenticity, and being [as] straightforward as possible." In keeping with his goals for the university, Rutland decided to take on the responsibility for preaching at nearly all of the school's chapel services himself. It has been reported that Rutland hoped to increase enrollment from its current level at just over 3,000 to as much as 6,500.

In 2011, Rutland announced he would leave ORU within two years; his successor, Billy Wilson, was chosen in January 2013 and took over the position on July 1, 2013. Rutland has remained active as the founder and director of the National Institute on Christian Leadership, a one-year educational program for ministry and business leaders.

== Published works ==
- Launch Out into the Deep, Rutland's memoir and autobiography, originally published in 1987.
- The Finger of God
- Hanging by a Thread
- Behind the Glittering Mask
- Streams of Mercy
- God of the Valleys
- Nevertheless
- Dream
- Character Matters
- Power
- Holiness
- Resurrection
- Most Likely to Succeed
- Relaunch
- 21 Seconds to Change Your World
- David the Great
- Of Kings and Prophets
- Keep On Keeping On: How to Die Young… As Old As Possible

Academic offices
Preceded by James L. Hennesy	Fourteenth President of Southeastern University; 1999–2009	Succeeded by Kent J. Ingle
Preceded by Ralph Fagin (acting)	Third President of Oral Roberts University; July 1, 2009–2012	Succeeded by William M. Wilson
