= Toy Gun Films =

Film production company developing imaginative art house films

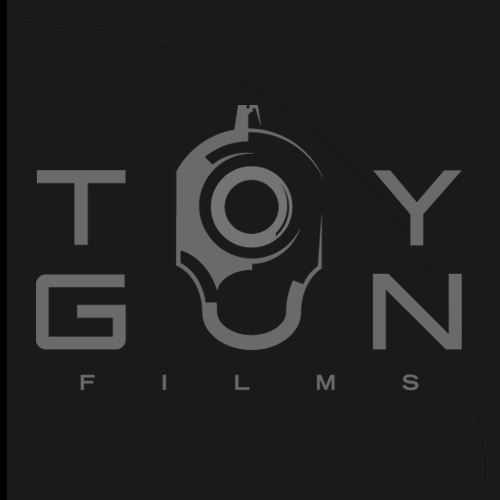
- Industry: Film
- Founded: 2009
- Headquarters: Los Angeles, California, United States; Oklahoma City, Oklahoma, United States, USA
- Products: Motion pictures
- Website: http://www.toygunfilms.com

Toy Gun Films is a film production company. The company was founded by Brent Ryan Green and Jeff Goldberg in 2009.

== List of films released by Toy Gun Films ==
Title	US Release	Notes
En Tus Manos	2010	En Tus Manos told the story of Carlos, who is growing up in a violent neighborhood of Bogota, Colombia. In an attempt to get away from his abusive home life, Carlos seeks membership in a brutal gang that forces him to find to courage to take his destiny in his hands.
Paper Flower	2011	Toy Gun Films produced a second short film, Paper Flower, that was filmed in Tokyo, Japan. Paper Flower follows the story of two best friends, Asuka and Michi who must decide how much of themselves they are willing to give to find true love. The film was directed by Brent Ryan Green and written by Jeff Goldberg.
Half Good Killer	2012	Toy Gun Films produced a third short film, Half Good Killer, that was filmed in Cape Town, South Africa. Half Good Killer follows a jaded child soldier fighting for an African rebel force as he struggles to survive the war he was thrust into as he reawakens to the life he was destined to lead. The film was directed by Brent Ryan Green and written by Jeff Goldberg.
Running Deer	2013	Toy Gun Films produced a fourth short film, Running Deer, that was filmed in Oklahoma. Running Deer focuses on a high school cross country star growing up in a Native American community who faces personal struggles the day before the most important race of his life. The film was directed by Brent Ryan Green and written by Jeff Goldberg. The film was previously on the film festival circuit and was also shown internationally as well as domestically.
23 Blast	2014	23 Blast. 23 Blast is a feature film on the true story of a high school football star who is suddenly stricken with irreversible total blindness, and must decide whether to live a safe handicapped life or return to the life he once knew and the sport he still loves.
Janey Makes a Play	2016	Janey Makes a Play is a documentary about 90-year-old playwright/director Janey Callahan-Chin and the making of her 18th musical theater production. The documentary was directed by Jared Callahan, the grandson of Callahan-Chin.
