= Kent J. Ingle =

President of Southeastern University (born 1962)

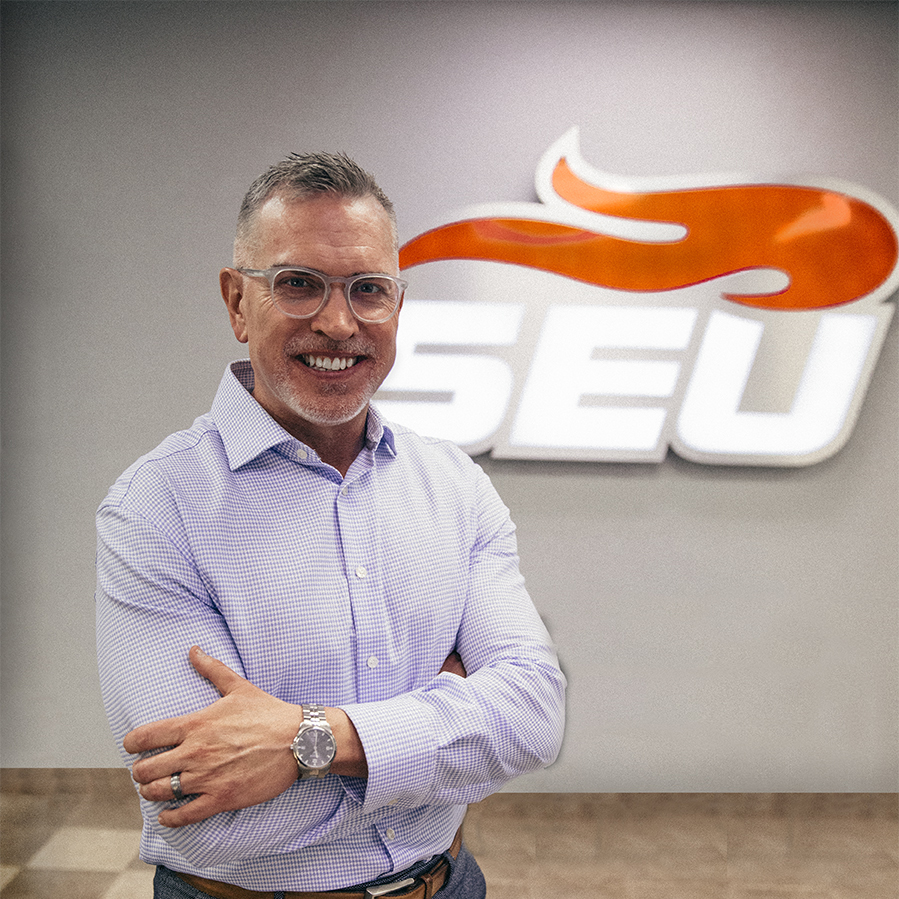
- Born: August 6, 1962 (age 64); Kansas City, Missouri
- Education: Vanguard University, Assemblies of God Theological Seminary
- Occupation: President of Southeastern University
- Website: www.kentingle.com

Kent J. Ingle (born August 6, 1962) is the 15th president of Southeastern University, in Lakeland, Florida.

== Early life and education ==
Ingle was born in Kansas City, Missouri. Because his father was a district manager for American Stores, the family moved around the country; first to Illinois, then to Colorado and finally California, which he considers his home.

Ingle received his Bachelor of Arts degree in broadcast journalism and his master's of theological studies from Vanguard University of Southern California in Costa Mesa, California. He later earned a doctor of ministry degree from the Assemblies of God Theological Seminary in Springfield, Missouri.

== Career ==
Ingle was ordained as an Assemblies of God minister in 1988. At the age of 18, he started as a television sports anchor and spent 10 years working for NBC and CBS affiliates. He started his career in Bakersfield, California, and finished his career in Los Angeles, California. During his time as an anchor, he covered many professional sports teams and interviewed hundreds of notable people in the professional sports world, including Michael Jordan, Magic Johnson, Kareem Abdul-Jabbar, Pete Rose, Muhammad Ali and Carl Lewis.

Ingle spent 15 years in pastoral leadership of two congregations - one in northwest Los Angeles and the other in Elgin, Illinois, a suburb of Chicago. Before becoming Southeastern's president in 2011, he served as the dean for the College of Ministry at Northwest University in Kirkland, Washington.

== President of Southeastern University ==
During Ingle's tenure, SEU expanded enrollment and added to its academic and athletic programs. The university grew from 2,546 students in 2011 to 13,646 students in the 2025–2026 school year, with over 200 Network Campuses and six regional campuses.

In the fall of 2014, SEU launched the first season of Fire football in its newly completed football stadium. In addition, construction was completed on a new College of Natural & Health Sciences Building.

In 2014, the Southeastern University board of trustees unanimously approved an expansion which included a 32,000-square-foot Welcome Center, a 120,000-square-foot Live/Learn Facility, and an eight-lane track and field facility. The expansion was expected to be completed in 2019.

Ingle is a founding member of the Presidents' Alliance on Immigration and Higher Education.

== Publications ==
Ingle has published five books:

- College Without Communism: How Christians Can Reclaim Truth in Higher Education
- This Adventure Called Life: Discovering Your Divine Design
- 9 Disciplines of Enduring Leadership
- Framework Leadership: Position Yourself for Transformational Change
- The Modern Guide to College

Academic offices
Preceded by Mark Rutland	Fifteenth President of Southeastern University (Florida); February 1, 2011 –	Succeeded by Incumbent
