= Pentecostal World Fellowship =

Fellowship of Evangelical Pentecostal churches

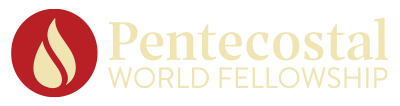
- Founded: 1947; 79 years ago, Zürich, Switzerland
- Type: Fellowship of Evangelical Pentecostal churches
- Headquarters: Tulsa, Oklahoma
- Location: Worldwide
- Members: 81 denominations & organizations from 50 countries
- Key people: William Wilson
- Website: pwfellowship.org

The Pentecostal World Fellowship is an international fellowship of Evangelical Pentecostal churches and denominations from across the world. The headquarters is in Tulsa, Oklahoma. Its leader is William Wilson (Tulsa, OK).

== History ==
The Pentecostal World Fellowship was founded in 1947 at Zürich, Switzerland, during a conference of Pentecostal leaders. This meeting was organized by Swiss pastor Leonard Steiner, who was assisted by David du Plessis. Since then, the Conference has been conducted in various major cities around the world, every three years. In 2001, the conference in Los Angeles, California, was convened in celebration of the Azusa Street Revival.

In 2019, William Wilson became Chairman of the organization.

== Conferences ==
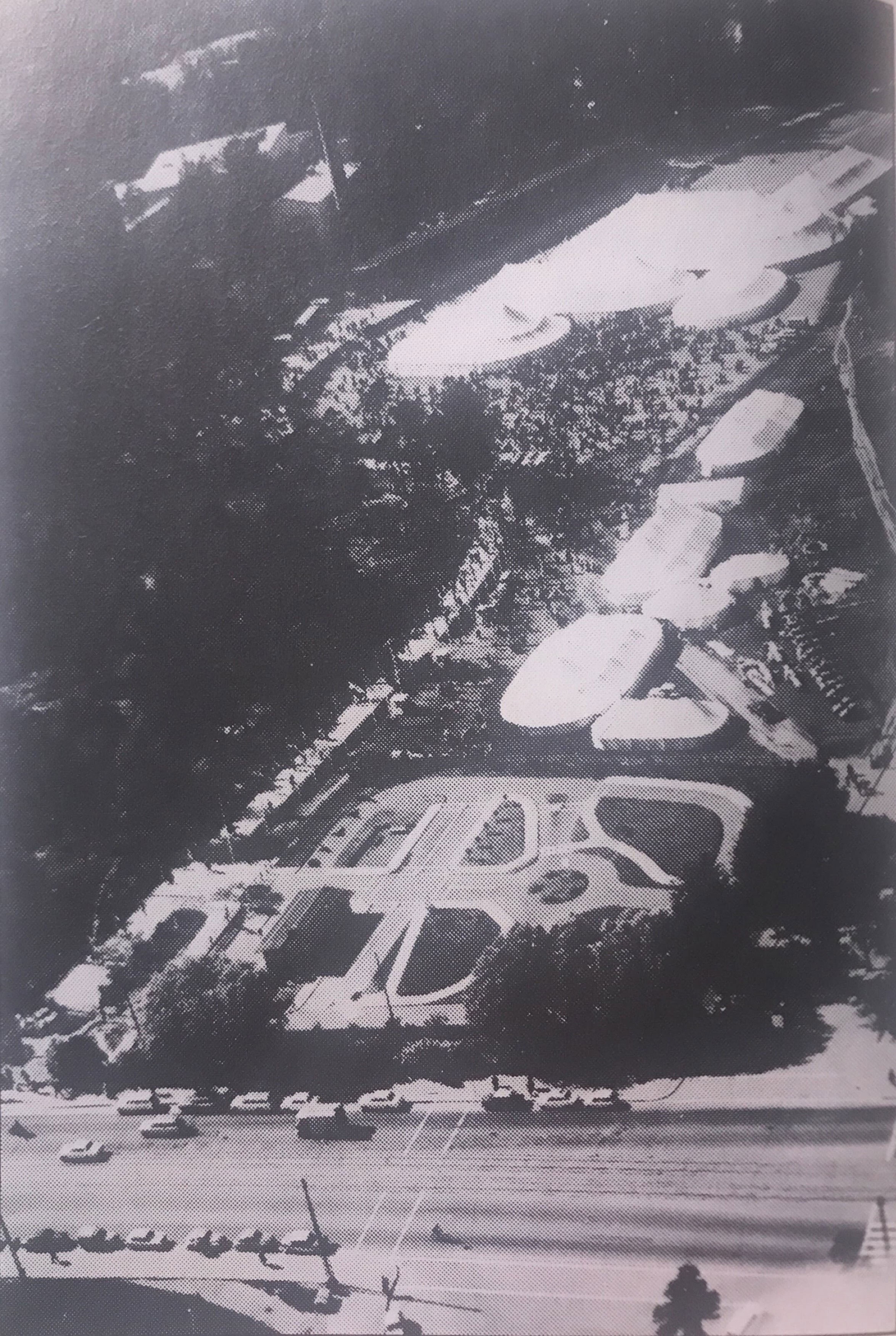
The World Pentecostal Conference 1964 was held in Helsinki on Laakso riding arena.

The Pentecostal World Fellowship has a conference every three years.

Occasion	Year	Location
1st	1947	Zürich, Switzerland
2nd	1949	Paris, France
3rd	1952	London, United Kingdom
4th	1955	Stockholm, Sweden
5th	1958	Toronto, Canada
6th	1961	Jerusalem, Israel
7th	1964	Helsinki, Finland
8th	1967	Rio de Janeiro, Brazil
9th	1970	Dallas, United States
10th	1973	Seoul, South Korea
11th	1976	London, United Kingdom
12th	1979	Vancouver, Canada
13th	1982	Nairobi, Kenya
14th	1985	Zürich, Switzerland
15th	1989	Singapore
16th	1992	Oslo, Norway
17th	1995	Jerusalem, Israel
18th	1998	Seoul, South Korea
19th	2001	Los Angeles, United States
20th	2004	Johannesburg, South Africa
21st	2007	Surabaya, Indonesia
22nd	2010	Stockholm, Sweden
23rd	2013	Kuala Lumpur, Malaysia
24th	2016	São Paulo, Brazil
25th	2019	Calgary, Canada
26th	2022	Seoul, South Korea
27th	2025	Helsinki, Finland
28th	2028	Manila, Philippines

== Member organizations ==
As of 2026, the Pentecostal World Fellowship has 81 member representatives in 50 countries.

Denomination / Organization	Country	Category
Apostolic Church of Pentecost of Canada	Canada	Pentecostal
Apostolic Faith Mission International	South Africa	Pentecostal
Apostolic Faith Mission of Namibia	Namibia	Pentecostal
Asambleas de Dios Costa Rica	Costa Rica	Pentecostal
Asia Assembly Mission Council	Hong Kong	Regional Fellowship
Assemblies of God Ghana	Ghana	Pentecostal
Assemblies of God Argentina	Argentina	Pentecostal
Assemblies of God of India	India	Pentecostal
Assemblies of God of Korea	South Korea	Pentecostal
Assemblies of God of Malaysia	Malaysia	Pentecostal
Assemblies of God Romania	Romania	Pentecostal
Assemblies of God USA	USA	Pentecostal
Assemblies of God in Great Britain	Great Britain	Pentecostal
Austrian Pentecostal Movement (Individual Representation)	Austria	Pentecostal
Australian Christian Churches	Australia	Pentecostal
Bangladesh Assemblies of God	Bangladesh	Pentecostal
BMS Bethel Church	Pakistan	Pentecostal
Calvary Church	Malaysia	Pentecostal / Megachurch
Cathedral of Praise	Philippines	Pentecostal / Megachurch
Church of God	USA	Pentecostal
Church of God in Christ	USA	Pentecostal
Church of God of Prophecy	USA	Pentecostal
Church of Pentecost	Ghana	Pentecostal
Church Growth International of the Americas	USA	Church Network / Charismatic
CRC Churches International	Australia	Pentecostal
Danish Pentecostal Movement (Individual Representation)	Denmark	Pentecostal
Église des Assemblées de Dieu du Togo	Togo	Pentecostal
Elim Pentecostal Church	United Kingdom	Pentecostal
Empowered21 / Oral Roberts University	USA	Global Initiative / Educational
Estonian Christian Pentecostal Church	Estonia	Pentecostal
Ethiopian Full Gospel Believers' Church	Ethiopia	Pentecostal
Evangelical Alliance Ireland	Ireland	Interdenominational Fellowship
Federación Confraternidad Evangélica Pentecostal	Argentina	Pentecostal / Fellowship
Federation of Pentecostal Churches	Italy	Pentecostal / Fellowship
Federation of Protestant Pentecostal Churches	Mauritius	Pentecostal / Fellowship
Fellowship of the Pentecostal Churches	India	Pentecostal
Foursquare Gospel Church of Canada	Canada	Pentecostal
Full Gospel Baptist Church Fellowship International	USA	Baptist-Pentecostal / Charismatic
Grace Bible Church	South Africa	Charismatic / Megachurch
Hungarian Pentecostal Church	Hungary	Pentecostal
Icelandic Pentecostal Movement (Individual Representation)	Iceland	Pentecostal
Indian Pentecostal Assemblies	India	Pentecostal
Indonesian Bethel Church	Indonesia	Pentecostal
Inheritance of Nations	Egypt	Charismatic / Independent
International Church of the Foursquare Gospel	USA	Pentecostal
International Mission of Holy Church of Christ	France	Pentecostal
International Pentecostal Holiness Church	USA	Pentecostal
IPHC Thailand	Thailand	Pentecostal
Japan Assemblies of God	Japan	Pentecostal
Jireh Evangel Church Planting Philippines Inc.	Philippines	Church Network / Mission
Kenya Assemblies of God	Kenya	Pentecostal
Liberia Assemblies of God	Liberia	Pentecostal
Manna Group of Ministries	India	Church Network / Ministry
Ministers Network Canada	Canada	Church Network / Charismatic
Moldovan Pentecostal Movement (Individual Representation)	Moldova	Pentecostal
Pakistan Assemblies of God	Pakistan	Pentecostal
Pentecostal Assemblies of Canada	Canada	Pentecostal
Pentecostal Assemblies of Newfoundland and Labrador	Canada	Pentecostal
Pentecostal Church in Poland	Poland	Pentecostal
Pentecostal Church of God	USA	Pentecostal
Pentecostal European Fellowship	Europe	Regional Fellowship
Pentecostal Fellowship of Sierra Leone	Sierra Leone	Pentecostal / Fellowship
Pentecostal Holiness Association Mission Tanzania	Tanzania	Pentecostal
Pentecostal Holiness Church	Hong Kong	Pentecostal
Pentecostal Holiness Church of Canada	Canada	Pentecostal
Russian Church of Christians of Evangelical Faith	Russia	Pentecostal
Spanish Assemblies of God (Individual Representation)	Spain	Pentecostal
Sri Lankan Pentecostal Movement (Individual Representation)	Sri Lanka	Pentecostal
Tanzania Assemblies of God	Tanzania	Pentecostal
The Alliance of Pentecostals and Charismatics	Singapore	Charismatic / Fellowship
The Assemblies of God of Singapore	Singapore	Pentecostal
The Independent Assemblies of God International	Canada	Pentecostal
The Pentecostal Assemblies of Bangladesh	Bangladesh	Pentecostal
The Pentecostal Church of Finland	Finland	Pentecostal
The Pentecostal Movement in Norway (Individual Representation)	Norway	Pentecostal
The Swedish Pentecostal Movement	Sweden	Pentecostal
The Sword of the Spirit Ministries	Nigeria	Charismatic / Ministry
Ukrainian Missionary Church	Ukraine	Pentecostal / Missionary
Union of Pentecostal Churches of Lithuania	Lithuania	Pentecostal
United Denominations Originating from Lighthouse Group of Churches	Ghana	Charismatic / Megachurch Network
Verenigde Pinkster- en Evangeliegemeenten	Netherlands	Pentecostal / Evangelical
Victory Christian Church	Ukraine	Charismatic / Pentecostal
Wesleyan Methodist Church	Brazil	Holiness-Pentecostal

== See also ==
- World Evangelical Alliance
- Bible
- Born again
- God in Christianity
- Believers' Church
