= The Veil (2017 film) =

American post-apocalyptic film

- Film poster
- Directed by: Brent Ryan Green
- Written by: Jeff Goldberg
- Produced by: Brent Ryan Green; Jeff Goldberg
- Starring: William Levy; Serinda Swan; William Moseley; Nick E. Tarabay
- Release date: April 15, 2017 (Brazil)
- Country: United States
- Language: English

The Veil is a 2017 American post-apocalyptic film directed by Brent Ryan Green and starring William Levy, Serinda Swan, William Moseley and Nick E. Tarabay. The film is also known as Rise of a Warrior and Barbarian: Rise of the Warrior.

== Premise ==
The Veil is set in a war-torn land where tribal factions live in fear of annihilation, and tells the story of a deadly warrior leading a destructive war campaign. When he is betrayed by his own and left for dead, he is healed by a mysterious princess and taken in by a hidden tribe that believes he was chosen to wage a final battle.

== Cast ==
- William Levy as Warrior.
- Serinda Swan as Zera.
- William Moseley as Aysel.
- Nick E. Tarabay as Reiken.
- Brett DelBuono as Nikai
- Adam Gregory as Warrior's Father
- Elizabeth "Liz" Tabish as Warrior's Mother
- Christopher Levy as Young Warrior
- Brent Ryan Green as Young Evil Emperor
- Owen Joyner as Mountain Tribe Boy

== Release ==
The Veil released in Brazil on April 15, 2017. It also released in the United Kingdom, where it was titled Barbarian: Rise of the Warrior.

== Reception ==
Starburst reviewed the film, noting it was "Not a perfect film, but definitely enjoyable for those already a fan of this genre."
