= Richard O. Stimson =

Richard O. Stimson (born May 15, 1957) is an American pastor who is the founder executive director of The Special Gathering, a Christian ministry within the mentally challenged community. The mission of Special Gathering is to "evangelize and disciple" this subculture made up of people who are developmentally delayed.

An ordained Assemblies of God minister, "Stimson conceived the idea for the ministry when he was in college and teaching a Sunday school class of mentally handicapped students in Lakeland, Florida." In 1982 after his graduation from Southeastern University, The Special Gathering of Cocoa, Florida was formed. The ministry has grown to eight programs in two states. The Special Gathering, Inc., is the umbrella organization. Coming under this ministry are The Special Gathering of Brevard, The Special Gathering of Indian River, The Special Gathering of South Carolina, The Special Gathering of Volusia, and The Special Gathering of Jacksonville.

== Community-based model of ministry ==
A proponent of the specialized model of ministry for individuals who are intellectually disabled, Stimson teaches that "community-based ministry is the most effective vehicle to use in spreading" the good news of Christianity to this sub-culture. Doing classic ministry, the heart of each Special Gathering is the chapel services which are conducted on a regular basis. Stimson writes, "God has ordained the local church to spread the good news of Christianity." Therefore, The Special Gathering in each geographic area remains subordinate to the local congregations. Daniel W. Burgess reported in Pentecostal Evangel, March 1987 issue, "The Special Gathering's intent is to lovingly nurture the spiritual life of each person."

== Advocacy ==
An avid advocate (Proverbs 31:8-9) for the rights of the people who are intellectually disabled, Stimson understands that the State and Federal governments are actively involved in the lives of his members. For this reason, it is important to serve as a watchdog and activist protecting the rights of vulnerable members of our society. It is Stimson's view that a pastor must be like a shepherd. Shepherds protect their sheep and that advocacy is part of pastoral care.

== Controversies ==
While some applaud the work he had done, Stimson has drawn controversial fire from other respected ministers within the disability community. Thomas B. Hoeksema, PhD, of Calvin College wrote, "We cannot always cave into the alleged social need to congregate. Persons with developmental disabilities are necessary to the integrated, normalized family of God. Without them, the Body of Christ is disabled (and) denied the diversity of gifts which people with retardation bring. Total segregation is not good for those with or without disabilities."

Brett Webb-Mitchell, PhD, used Stimson's model of ministry as an example of what should not be done in ministry for individuals who are intellectually disabled. In his article published in the 1994 issue of the Journal of Religion in Disability & Rehabilitation. Webb-Mitchell wrote, "A Florida pastor has formed congregations for only people with mental retardation and some of these have existed for more than 10 years. He has taken those with mental retardation out of the worship of 'normal congregations.' They now gather together in rented halls on Sunday mornings for their own church, called 'A Special Gathering.' Why? Because he thought putting persons with mental retardation into worship would be like placing them in a high school algebra class. For this pastor, worship is merely a thing of the mind."

== Author and publisher ==
Stimson has been published in the Mental Retardation, a Journal of Policy, Practices, and Perspective, published by the American Association on Mental Retardation, and The Journal of Religion, Disability and Health published by Haworth Press. Articles about The Special Gathering have appeared in Christianity Today, Pentecostal Evangel, Charisma, and many other magazines. Stimson served as publisher of the quarterly journal, Networks, published by The Special Gathering from 1991 to 1994.

== Education ==
Stimson has a BA from Southeastern University and a Masters from the Moody Bible Institute.

== Works ==
- Hoeksema, Thomas B., PhD and Stimson, Richard. "Reactions to Normalization," Networks for Those With Specialized Ministry; 1993, April.
- Stimson, Richard. "Everyone is Beautiful," Mental Retardation, a Journal of Policy, Practices and Perspective, Vol 39, No 2: 152–154, 2001 April.
- Stimson, Richard. "Marriage, Sex and Babies," Networks for Those With Specialized Ministry; 1990, August.
- Stimson, Richard, "Reaping From the Labors of Others," Networks for Those With Specialized Ministry; 1992, July.
- Stimson, Richard. "The Church: Knight in Tarnished Armor," Networks for Those With Specialized Ministry; 1990 November.
- Stimson, Richard. "We Cannot Remain Neutral," Networks for Those With Specialized Ministry; 1991, October.
- Stimson, Richard. "What They Need is Jesus," Networks for Those With Specialized Ministry; 1992, January.
