= Jacob Blankenship (basketball) =

Greek-American basketball player

Jacob Blankenship Γιάκομπ Μπλανκενσιπ
Free agent
- Position: Power forward / center

Personal information
- Born: August 4, 1989 (age 37) New Smyrna Beach, Florida
- Listed height: 6 ft 10 in (2.08 m)
- Listed weight: 256 lb (116 kg)

Career information
- High school: New Smyrna Beach (New Smyrna Beach, Florida)
- College: Daytona State (2007–2008); Santa Fe CC (2008–2009); Mississippi Valley (2009–2010); Southeastern (FL) (2010–2011)
- NBA draft: 2012: undrafted
- Playing career: 2011–present

Career history
- 2011: VL Pesaro
- 2011–2012: Treceria
- 2012–2013: Once Caldas de Manizales
- 2016: Peristeri

Jacob Blankenship (Greek: Γιάκομπ Μπλάνκενσιπ; born August 4, 1989) is a Greek-American professional basketball player. He is 2.08 m tall. He plays the power forward and the center position.

== High school career ==
Blankenship played high school basketball at New Smyrna Beach, in New Smyrna Beach, Florida.

== College career ==
Blankenship played college basketball at four different colleges, including Daytona State College, Santa Fe Community College, Mississippi Valley State and Southeastern University.

== Professional career ==
Blankenship declared for the 2011 NBA draft but later he withdrew, making himself automatic eligible at the 2012 NBA draft. On November 21, 2011 he signed with VL Pesaro. Later that year, he joined Terceira of the Portuguese Basketball Premier League.

On September 27, 2012 he joined Once Caldas de Manizales of the Colombian Basketball League.

The following two years, Blankenship didn't play for any team.

After gaining a Greek passport, he signed on February 6, 2016 with the Greek A2 club Peristeri.
