= KGEB =

Television station in Tulsa, Oklahoma

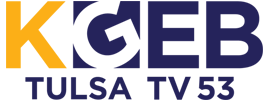
- Tulsa, Oklahoma; United States
- Channels: Digital: 12 (VHF); Virtual: 53
- Branding: KGEB Tulsa

Programming
- Affiliations: 53.1: GEB Network; for others, see § Subchannels

Ownership
- Owner: Oral Roberts University; (University Broadcasting, Inc.)

History
- First air date: January 24, 1996
- Former call signs: KWMJ (1996–1999)
- Former channel numbers: Analog: 53 (UHF, 1996–2009); Digital: 49 (UHF, 2009–2018)
- Call sign meaning: Golden Eagle Broadcasting (refers to the Golden Eagles, Oral Roberts University's mascot and sports teams)

Technical information
- Licensing authority: FCC
- Facility ID: 24485
- ERP: 21.5 kW
- HAAT: 182 m (597 ft)
- Transmitter coordinates: 36°2′35″N 95°57′12″W

Links
- Public license information: Public file; LMS
- Website: www.kgeb.net

KGEB (channel 53) is a religious television station in Tulsa, Oklahoma, United States, owned by Oral Roberts University. Its studios are contained within the Mabee Center arena on the ORU campus in south Tulsa, and its transmitter is atop the central tower of the CityPlex Towers complex directly south of the campus. Despite its ownership by a non-profit university, the station holds a commercial license, allowing it to carry several advertising-supported subchannel networks.

KGEB's programming is distributed throughout the United States as GEB Network on satellite provider DirecTV, select cable systems, several other American television stations in major markets, and an online live stream.

== History ==
The station first signed on the air on January 24, 1996, as KWMJ; when it began operations, the station maintained a 24-hour family-oriented programming format, consisting mostly of religious programs along with a few classic and public domain television programs.

In June 1999, during the broadcast of two children's programs that aired on the station, it inadvertently ran an advertisement for a videocassette of the episode being aired, followed by a commercial for a toy resembling a character from the same episode. Under the Federal Communications Commission (FCC)'s Children's Television Act, the usage of character tie-ins in advertising during children's programs is treated as a program-length commercial in violation with an advertising clause in the Act. The station originally was to be fined $8,000, but it was reduced 20% to $6,400, as the station took immediate action to avert it from happening again and it self-reported the violation to the FCC's Media Bureau, notice of the fine was not given by the FCC until March 2007, and that it was a syndicator error not under the station's control.

The station changed its callsign to KGEB on November 29, 1999, becoming the originating station of the Golden Eagle Broadcasting (now GEB America) network. By this point, the station gradually shifted towards a lineup mainly featuring religious programming, including programs produced by the station—such as weekly services from the ORU Chapel—as well as syndicated religious programs (both those distributed exclusively to religious broadcasters and those distributed to both religious and commercial broadcasters)—including programs from televangelists such as James Robison, Jim Bakker, Joel Osteen and Joyce Meyer, as well as a very sparse amount of secular programming and a block of children's programs complying with the FCC's educational programming guidelines on Saturdays.

The station also offers five other subchannels of programming from other commercial digital subchannel and shopping networks, and an additional subchannel carrying ORU's on-campus closed circuit channel, which includes daily campus chapel services, athletic events not covered by other Summit League television deals, and other programming of interest to students and faculty.

== Technical information ==
=== Subchannels ===
The station's signal is multiplexed:

Subchannels of KGEB
Subchannel	Res.	Short name	Programming
53.1	1080i	KGEB-HD	GEB Network
53.2	480i	JTV	Jewelry TV
53.3	480i	BUZZR	Buzzr
53.4	480i	CBNNews	CBN News
53.5	480i	QUEST	Quest
53.6	480i	great	Great
53.7	480i	TCN	True Crime Network

=== Analog-to-digital conversion ===
KGEB shut down its analog signal, over UHF channel 53, on June 12, 2009, the official date on which full-power television stations in the United States transitioned from analog to digital broadcasts under federal mandate. The station's digital signal remained on its pre-transition UHF channel 49, using virtual channel 53.
