= Southeastern University =

Christian university in Lakeland, Florida, US

Coordinates: 28.0286214°N 81.9173312°W

- Former names: Southeastern Bible Institute (1935–1956); Southeastern Bible College (1956–1977); Southeastern College of the Assemblies of God (1977–2005)
- Motto: Transforming Minds. Engaging Culture.
- Type: Private university
- Established: 1935; 91 years ago
- Religious affiliation: Assemblies of God
- Chancellor: Tommy Barnett
- President: Kent J. Ingle
- Provost: Meghan L. Griffin
- Faculty: 165
- Students: 10,000
- Location: Lakeland, Florida, United States
- Campus: 88 acres (360,000 m^{2})
- Colors: Black & Red
- Nickname: Fire
- Sporting affiliations: NAIA – The Sun; NCCAA – South
- Mascot: Scorch
- Website: seu.edu
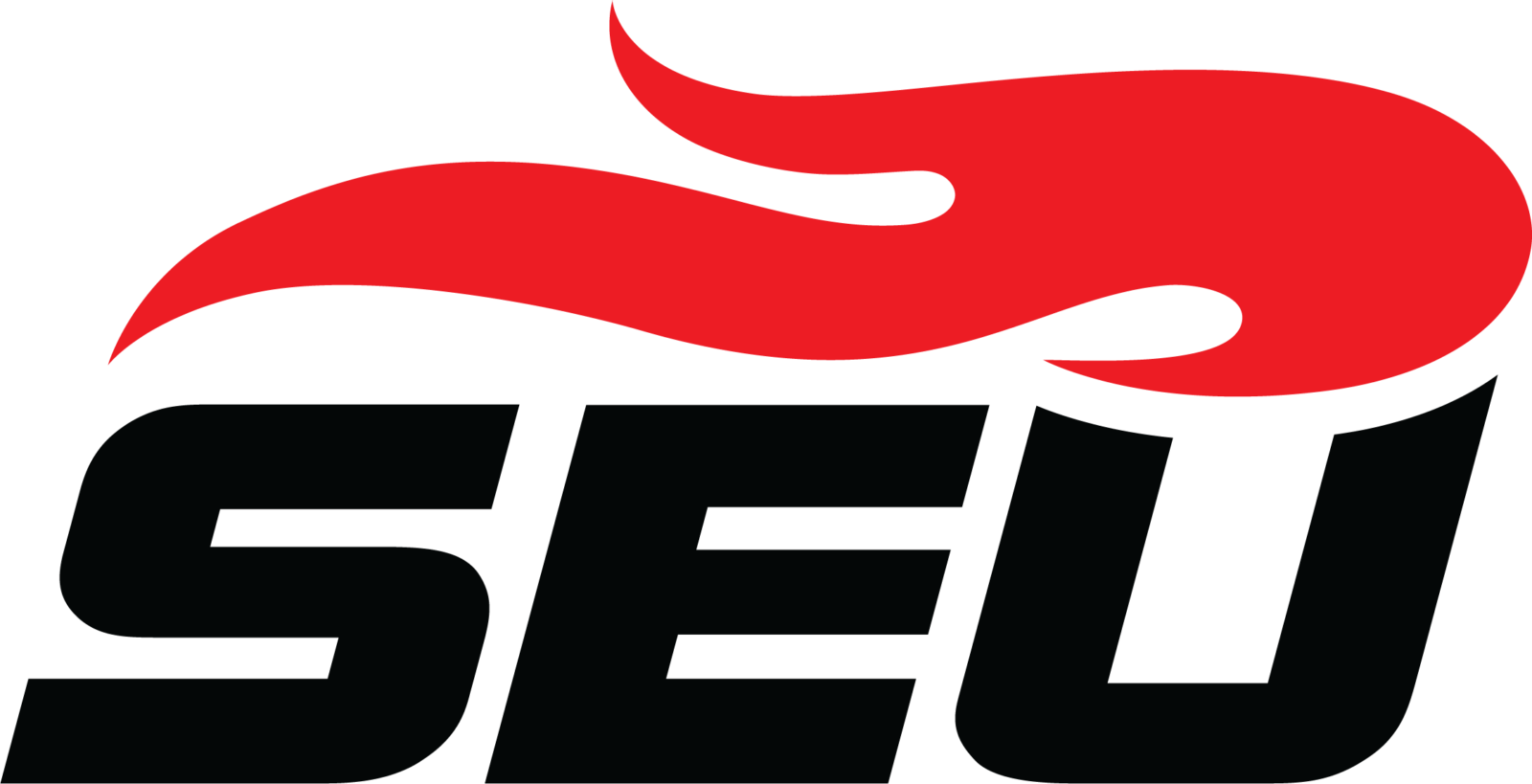

Southeastern University is a private Christian university in Lakeland, Florida, United States. It was established in 1935 in New Brockton, Alabama, as Southeastern Bible Institute, relocated to Lakeland in 1946, and became a liberal arts college in 1970. It is the largest Assemblies of God educational institution in the United States.

== History ==
Southeastern University was founded in 1935 in New Brockton, Alabama, by Assemblies of God Alabama District superintendent J.C. Thames and other Southeastern district leaders as the Alabama Shield of Faith Institute. It was renamed the South-Eastern Bible Institute (SEBI) in 1936. Originally located in a former high school building in New Brockton, Alabama, it opened its doors to students on November 4, 1935, under the direction of four faculty members. Two years later, in May 1937, the first graduation exercises were held. Seventeen students received diplomas for the two-year academic program.

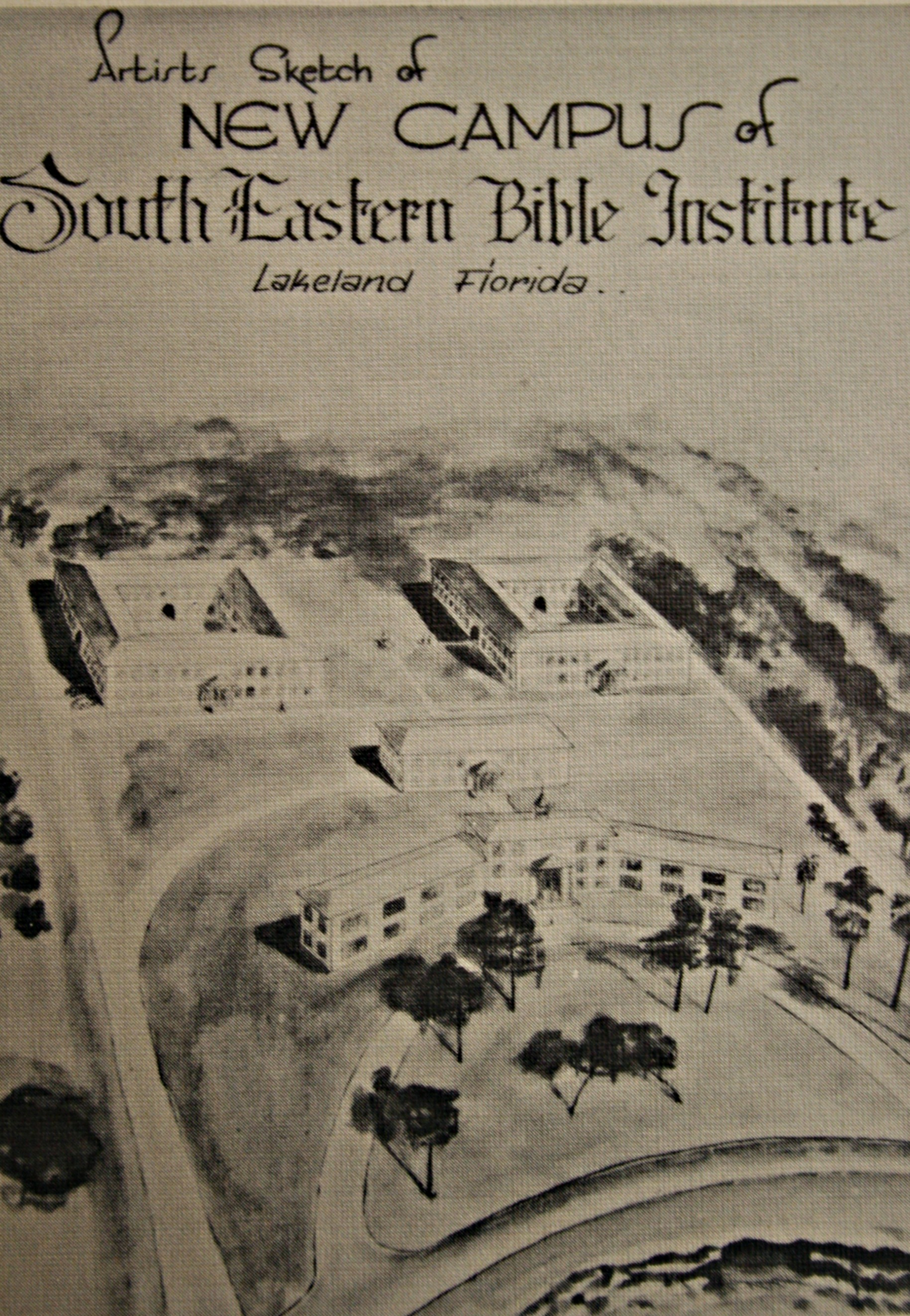
Undated sketch of the campus

SEBI continued classes in New Brockton until 1940 when a decision was made to consolidate the school with Beulah Heights Bible Institute in Atlanta, Georgia. The school was known from 1940 to 1942 as the Beulah Heights—South-Eastern Bible Institute. In the fall of 1942, the district superintendents of the Southeastern districts accepted the invitation of the Rev. Ralph Byrd and his congregation to move the school to another location in Atlanta where it was once again renamed SEBI. In 1946, the school's board of directors voted to secure a permanent location for the full development of the school. A new campus location was purchased later that year in Lakeland, Florida. The Atlanta campus was sold, and development of the new site began. Student body growth continued at the new central Florida campus along with the academic program.

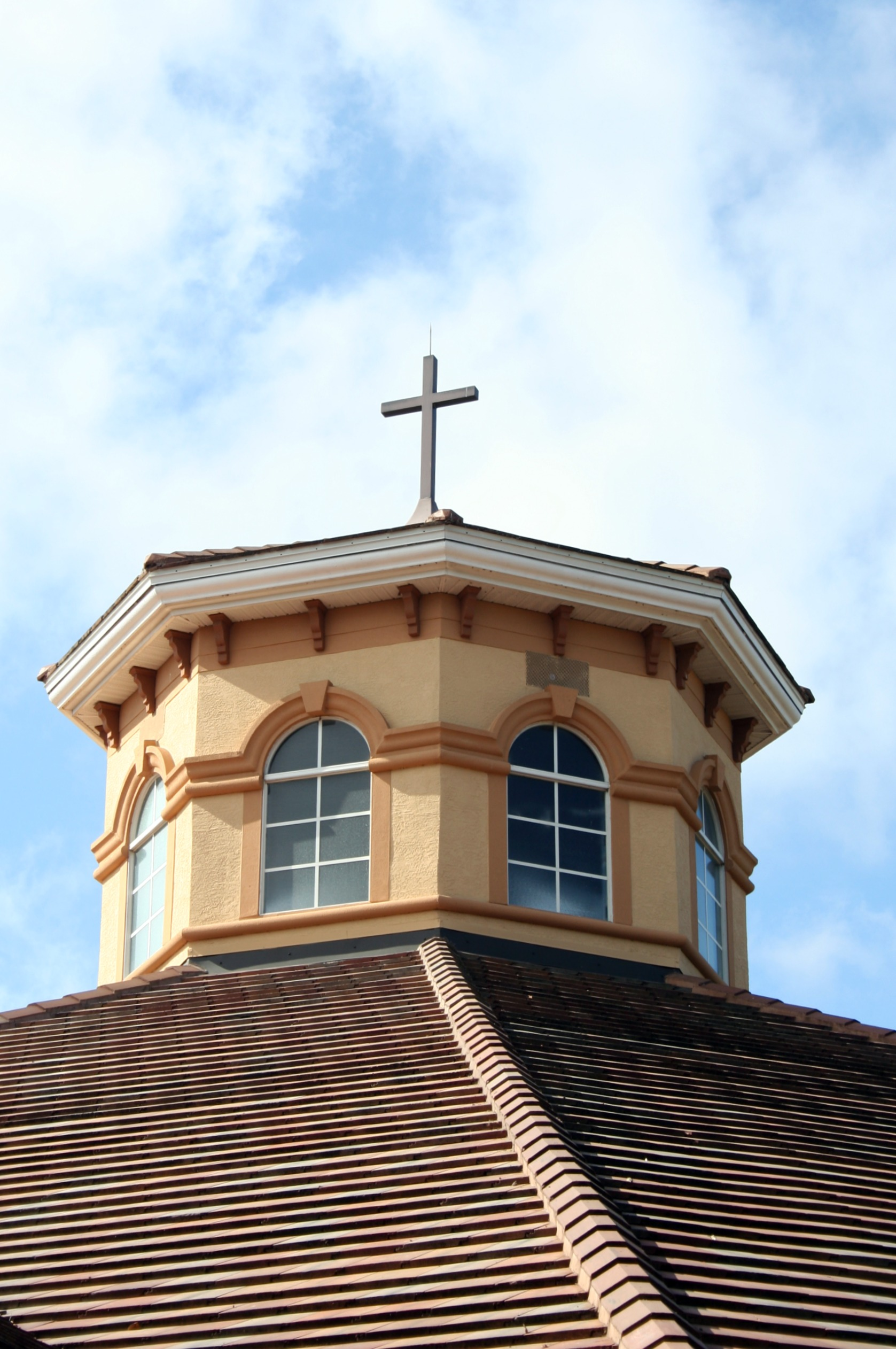
Bush Chapel

SEBI became South-Eastern Bible College in 1956 when the school began offering four-year bachelor's degree programs. After adding education degrees, the college's board of directors changed the school name to Southeastern College of the Assemblies of God in 1977. In 1986, Southeastern was granted regional accreditation by the Southern Association of Colleges and Schools Commission on Colleges. Accreditation was reaffirmed in 1991, 2001, and 2011. In 2005, Southeastern College officially became Southeastern University, and began offering its first master's degree programs, and formed the colleges of arts and sciences, business, Christian ministries and religion, and education. Since then, the university has also formed the colleges of behavioral and social sciences and natural and health sciences. In 2014, it began its first doctoral program, the EdD.

In 2011, Southeastern undertook several initiatives that resulted in rapid growth. From 2,500 students in 2012, the school expanded to 4,538 in the fall of 2015, a growth rate of 78% since 2011. In 2012, Southeastern approved the addition of a nursing program and the addition of a college football team. The football expansion included the construction of a stadium that seats 3,500 spectators and an athletic training center. The Southeastern Fire football team played their first home game in the fall of 2014. Also, in 2014, the school opened new baseball and soccer facilities. In 2015, construction began on several new academic buildings, a new athletic complex including a gymnasium, and an 8-lane track. In the fall of 2015, Southeastern opened a new 27,000-square-foot Natural and Health Sciences building. The new facility includes an auditorium, chemistry labs, computer labs, exam rooms, patient care rooms, and a nursing simulation lab. The summer of 2015 saw the demolition of Spence Hall, Lindsey Science Building, and the Music Hall in order to make way for the Live/Learn Facility, known as Buena Vida. The 125,000-square-foot facility was completed in the fall of 2016 and includes classrooms, faculty offices, student housing, and a food court. The first segment of Buena Vida, the Choral and Rehearsal Hall, opened in September. The total cost of the expansion program will be between $25 and $50 million.

Southeastern offers 55 bachelor's degrees, 16 master's degrees, and two doctoral degrees. Since President Kent J. Ingle came to Southeastern in 2011, the university has launched 80 extension sites across the nation, an increase from the previous year's 50 extension sites. The sites are in 29 states, including Florida, which has 19. The degrees offered at the sites include a variety of associate, bachelor's, and a master's degree in ministry and leadership.

In 2017, the university was granted an exception to certain provisions of Title IX expressed in several regulations under 34 C.F.R., which allowed Southeastern to legally discriminate regarding gender identity and sexual orientation for religious reasons.

In the spring of 2020, the university began taking steps to respond to financial challenges, citing the COVID-19 pandemic as the reason for such financial hardships. This included a reduction in the number of faculty working at the institution (a reduction of 162 faculty members down to 128), salary cuts for all administrators, and a hiring freeze.

== Academics ==
Southeastern University is organized into six colleges. The College of Arts & Media houses the Department of Communication, Department of Humanities, and Department of Music. The other five colleges are the Jannetides College of Business and Entrepreneurial Leadership, the College of Education, the College of Behavioral and Social Sciences, the College of Christian Ministries and Religion, and the College of Natural and Health Sciences.

Southeastern University offers 80 majors leading to the Bachelor of Arts or Bachelor of Science degrees. In addition to these, the university also offers 16 master's degrees and two doctoral degrees. They also incorporate a full online program that offers 23 of their own campus degrees including nine undergraduate degrees, thirteen master's degrees, and two doctoral degrees.

=== Rankings ===
Southeastern University was ranked #331-440 in the National Universities category by U.S. News & World Report's Best Colleges in 2022-23.

== Library ==
The Steelman Library is the academic library at Southeastern University. It provides customer service to both in-person and online students of Southeastern University.

The library collection contains over 100,000 books, 800 periodical titles, 2,500 videos, and other multimedia for class courses and research. The Steelman Library houses a Curriculum Lab that includes children's materials and textbooks for education students.

== Student life ==
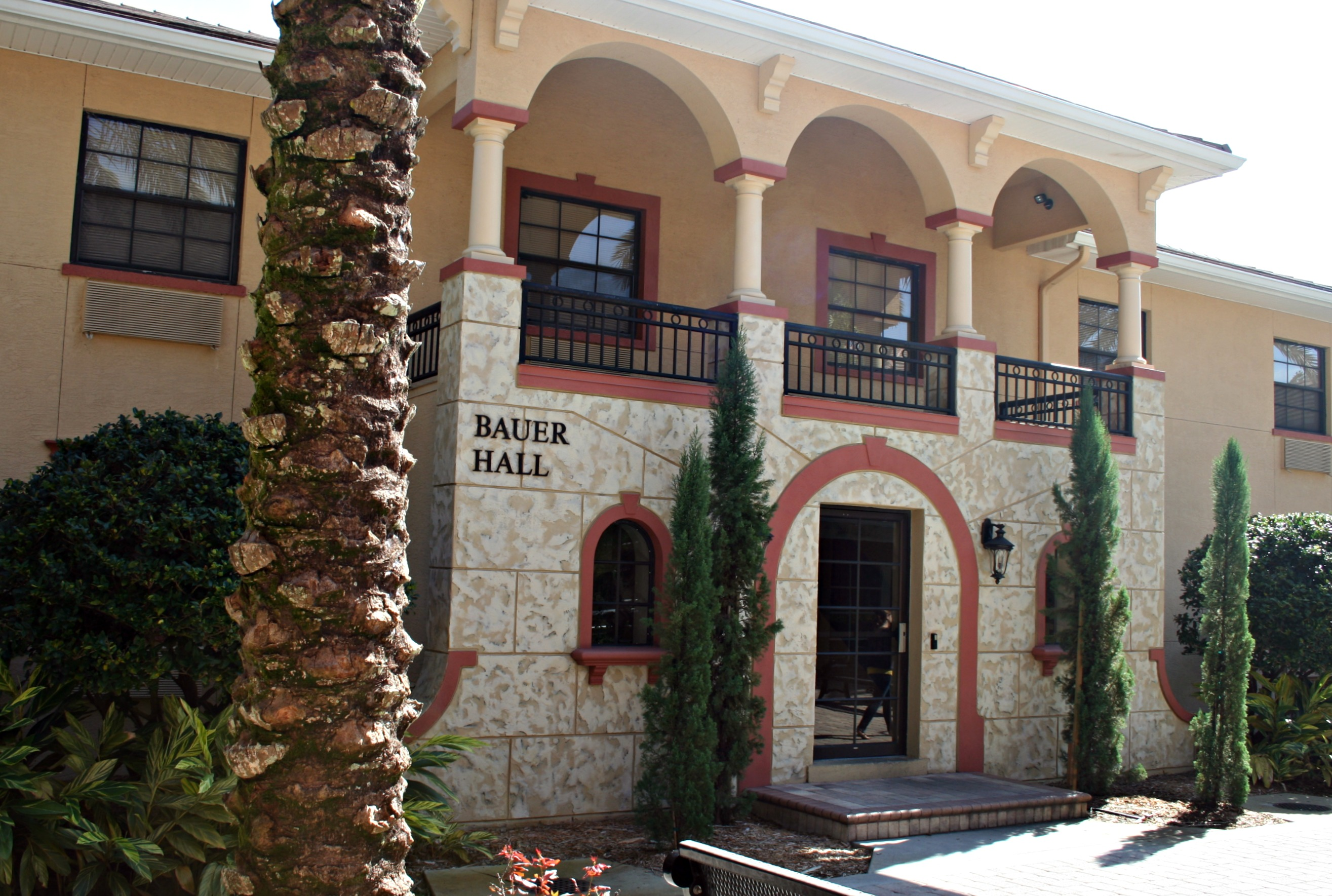
Bauer Hall serves as the male residence hall.

=== LGBT policy ===
Southeastern University views gay marriage as a sin against the will of God, and as an "illegitimate moral option" for any Christian. The school has obtained a Title IX exemption in regards to gender identity and sexual orientation discrimination for their human sexuality policy.

=== Debate team ===
In the fall of 2013, Southeastern University launched their debate program. They compete as members of the Florida Intercollegiate Forensics Association (FIFA), participating in both Lincoln-Douglas debate, Parliamentary debate and British Parliamentary debate. SEU Debate won the FIFA State Championship Debate Tournament in February 2014, closing out Lincoln-Douglas finals. In the fall of 2015, during the University of Southern Mississippi tournament, SEU Debate took home 17 individual awards and were the only institution to advance all of their teams. SEU Debate is a student-led team.

=== Forum at SEU ===
Held annually on the university's Lakeland campus, the Forum at SEU provides actionable leadership training to the students.

=== SEU Chapel ===
SEU Chapel are Christian services. SEU Worship is the worship expression of the students.

== Athletics ==
The Southeastern athletic teams are called the Fire. The school's mascot is known as Scorch. The university is a member of the National Association of Intercollegiate Athletics (NAIA), primarily competing in the Sun Conference (formerly known as the Florida Sun Conference (FSC) until after the 2007–08 school year) since the 2009–10 academic year. The Fire previously competed as a member of the National Christian College Athletic Association (NCCAA), primarily competing as an independent in the South Region of both the Division II and Division I levels. The Fire previously competed as an NAIA Independent within the Association of Independent Institutions (AII) during the 2008–09 school year.

Southeastern competes in 19 intercollegiate varsity sports: Men's sports include baseball, basketball, cross country, football, golf, soccer, tennis, track & field and wrestling; while women's sports include basketball, beach volleyball, cross country, golf, soccer, softball, tennis, track & field and volleyball; and co-ed sports include cheerleading.

The university added softball, men's tennis, and men's & women's cross country during the 2012–13 school year, and women's golf for 2013–14. Southeastern currently competes in seven men's and seven women's sports, after the addition of football in the 2014–15 academic year. Men's wrestling was added in the 2015–2016 academic year, becoming the state's first collegiate scholarship program in decades.

The men's golf team won the NCCAA National Championship in 2007. In 2018, the baseball team swept the tournament to win the NAIA national championship, the first team to do so since 2013. The team finished the season with a 59–7 record.

== Notable alumni ==
- Melony Bell, politician
- Jacob Blankenship, professional basketball player
- Gerritson Craane, soccer player for the Curaçao national football team
- Bryan Duncan, American contemporary Christian music artist
- Dee Gordon, MLB second baseman, two-time All-Star selection
- J. C. Hayward, first female news anchor in Washington, D.C., and the first African American female news presenter
- Kristen Ledlow, sports anchor
- KJ-52, Christian rapper
- Uchenna Kanu, soccer player for the Liga MX Femenil club Tigres UANL and the Nigeria women's national team
- Matt Parziale, golfer
- Seth Ready, Christian gospel, worship and pop artist
- Christian Señeres, Member of the Philippine House of Representatives
- Richard O. Stimson, founder, pastor and executive director of The Special Gathering

== See also ==
- Independent Colleges and Universities of Florida
