= William Wilson (American academic) =

President of Oral Roberts University (born 1958)

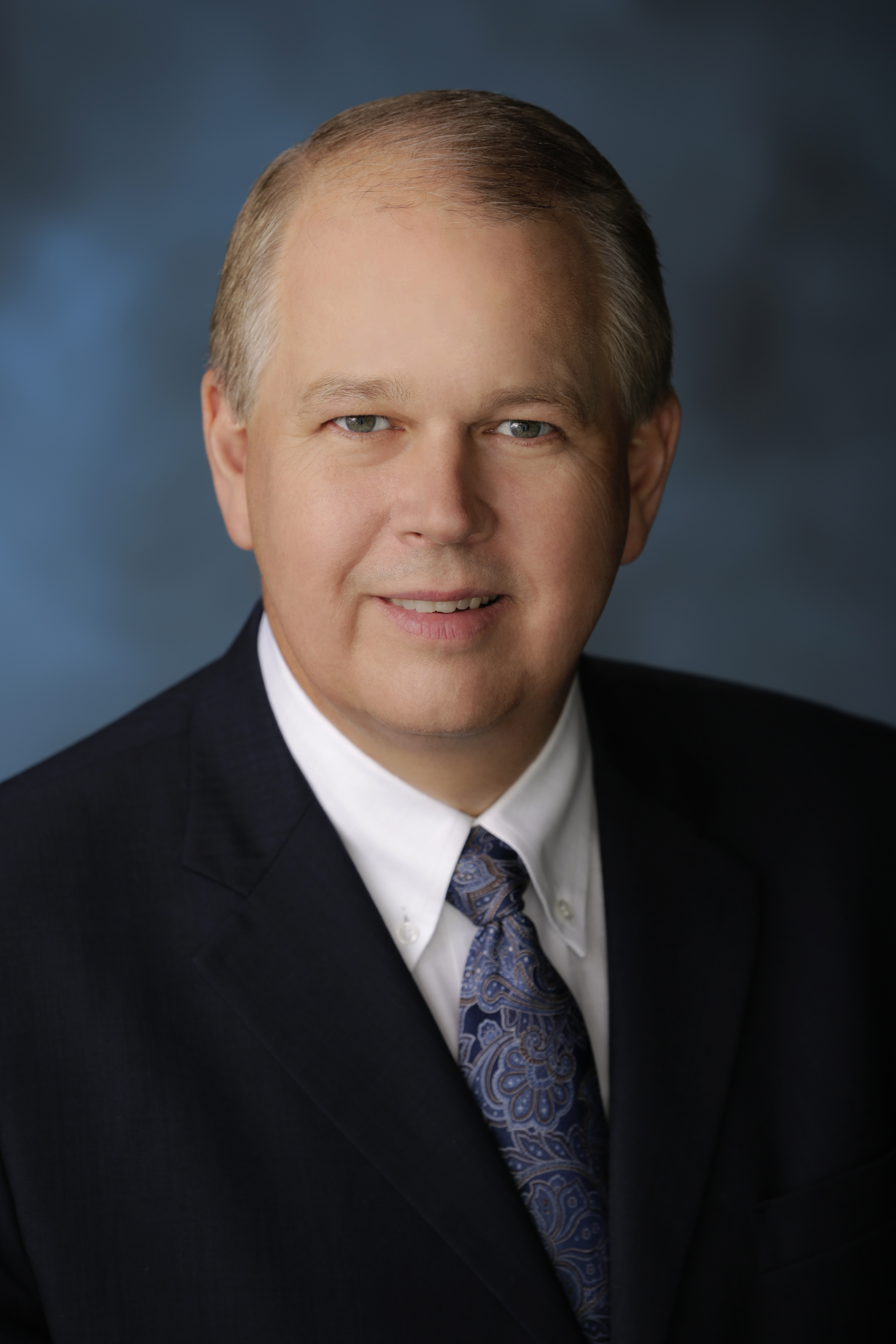
- Official portrait for Oral Roberts University

4th President of Oral Roberts University
- Incumbent
- Assumed office June 1, 2013
- Preceded by: Mark Rutland; Richard Roberts; Oral Roberts

Personal details
- Born: William Marion Wilson; October 4, 1958 (age 67) Owensboro, Kentucky, U.S.
- Education: Western Kentucky University; Pentecostal Theological Seminary
- Profession: Academic, author, Evangelist
- Website: www.oru.edu

William Marion Wilson (born October 4, 1958) is the president of Oral Roberts University in Tulsa, Oklahoma. He was previously the vice chairman for ORU board of trustees.

== Early life ==
Wilson was born in Owensboro, Kentucky and attended Daviess County High School. He then attended Western Kentucky University in Bowling Green, Kentucky, where he earned a bachelor's degree in secondary education. Wilson also attended the Pentecostal Theological Seminary in Cleveland, Tennessee, where he earned his Master of Arts and Doctor of Ministry degrees.

== Career ==
=== Early work ===
In 2006, Wilson served as the executive officer for the Azusa Street Centennial in Los Angeles, California, which drew more than 50,000 people from 106 nations. He also worked the Awakening American Alliance to create national ecumenical coalitions with more than 250 denominations and parachurch ministries.

=== President of Oral Roberts University ===
Wilson joined the ORU board of trustees in 2008. He was announced as the fourth president of Oral Roberts University on January 31, 2013 and began his term on June 1, 2013. Since taking this post, he has launched the “Whole Leaders for the Whole World” campaign which has raised money for scholarships, as well as overseeing building work for a new library, nursing and engineering complex and athletic centres.

== Other work ==
=== Committees ===
Wilson has worked with the Church of God of Prophecy and the Church of God.

Wilson has also served as the executive director of the International Center for Spiritual Renewal in Cleveland, Tennessee and the chair and executive director of the Empowered 21 Initiative. In addition, he has served on boards and committees for Mission America Coalition (Lausanne, USA) Facilitation Committee, the Pentecostal World Fellowship advisory board, and the International Christian Embassy Jerusalem.

In 2022 he was chosen to lead the Pentecostal World Fellowship; this was his second term as chair.

=== Publications ===
Wilson has written ten books including:

- Father Cry
- Fasting Forward: Advancing Your Spiritual Life Through Fasting

== Personal life ==
Wilson is married to Lisa. They have two children and several grandchildren.
