= John Carta =

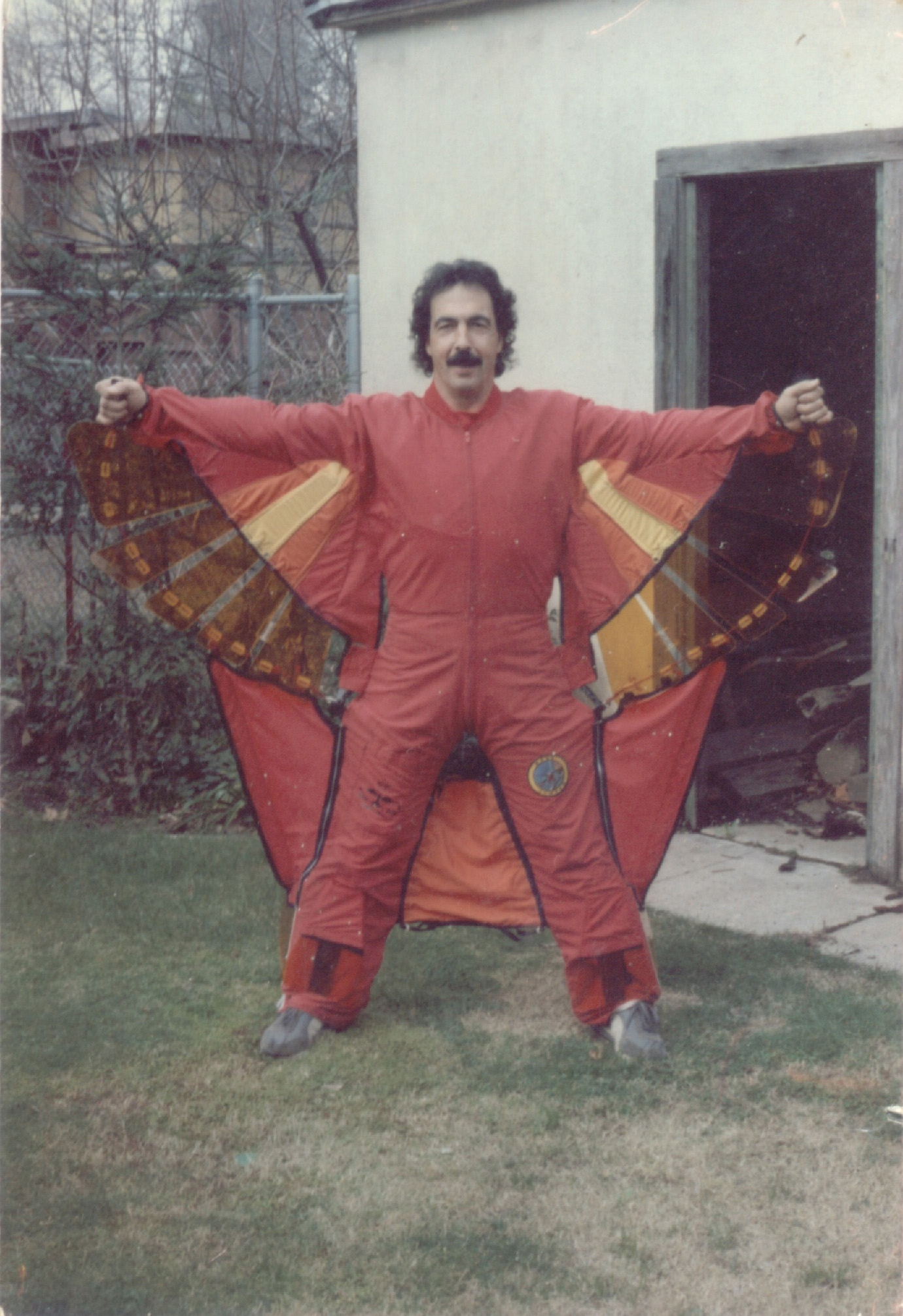
John Carta wearing the bat wings

Giovanni Carta, also known as John Carta (Alghero, January 7, 1946 – Clear Lake, September 29, 1990), was an Italian American airman and parachutist, veteran of the Vietnam War.

He was nicknamed "Birdman." Carta was a Base Jumping pioneer and a veteran of the Vietnam War, where he piloted Bell UH-1 Iroquois helicopters on rescue missions. He was decorated with the War Cross for Military Valor.

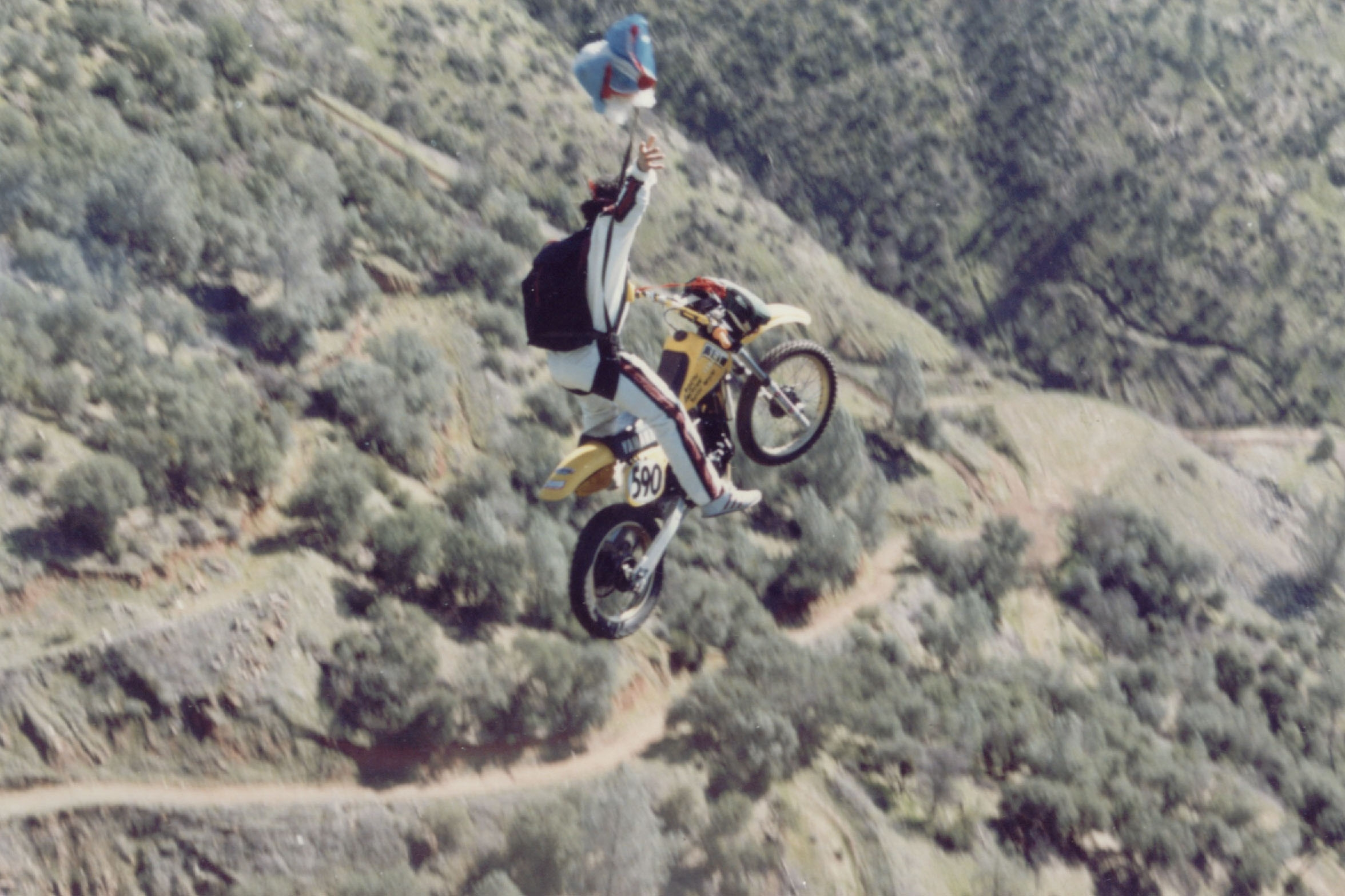
John Carta parachuting from a motorcycle

He parachuted onto the roof of the World Trade Center in New York in 1981; and launched himself from a tower of the Verrazzano Bridge in 1982.

In 1986, using a portable ramp, he jumped from the Foresthill Bridge in California on a motorcycle then deployed his parachute, leaving the motorcycle to smash to pieces in the canyon below.

He jumped from the Leaning Tower of Pisa, in Italy, and from George Washington Bridge in New York, in 1987, after he missed the World Trade Center and landed in a construction zone. He was arrested and charged with Reckless Endangerment and his parachutes were confiscated. The charges were dismissed, and when he got his gear back he jumped from the George Washington Bridge.

He experimented with bat wings in many of his parachute launches.

On August 16, 1990, he broke his back after his parachute failed during a jump from an office building in Oakland; he was charged with trespass but the charge was dropped due to his injuries.

Carta was killed on September 29, 1990, when the Lockheed PV-2 Harpoon in which he was a passenger crashed during an impromptu aerobatics display over Clear Lake, California.

== Bibliography ==
- Smith, Jordan Fisher (2005). Nature Noir: A Park Ranger's Patrol in the Sierra. Houghton Mifflin Harcourt. ISBN 978-0-618-22416-6.
- Abrams, Michael (2006). Birdmen, Batmen, and Skyflyers. Harmony Books. ISBN 9781400054916.
- Bozzolo, Raffaele Sari; Fois, Massimiliano (2008). Un'altra Alghero (in Italian). Panoramika. ISBN 978-88-89486-10-8.
