= Janey Makes a Play =

- Directed by: Jared Callahan
- Written by: Jared Callahan
- Produced by: Jared Callahan; Brent Ryan Green
- Starring: Janey Callahan-Chin
- Cinematography: Bryan Bangerter
- Edited by: Brad Kester
- Music by: Joel P. West
- Distributed by: Uncork'd Entertainment
- Release dates: March 2015 (Atlanta); June 28, 2016
- Running time: 80 minutes
- Country: United States
- Language: English

Janey Makes a Play is a 2015 American documentary film about playwright/director Janey Callahan-Chin, then 90 years old, and the making of her 18th musical theater production. The documentary was directed by Callahan-Chin's grandson Jared Callahan and distributed by Uncork'd Entertainment. The film premiered at the 2015 Atlanta Film Festival and released digitally on June 28, 2016.
