= Gary Donatelli =

American television soap opera director

Gary Donatelli (born March 11, 1951, in Northbrook, Illinois, US) is an American television soap opera director. Beside television work, Donatelli directed Billion Dollar Rockets, a music video for the One Life Many Voices CD and Lean On Me" a series of three mini dramas for post-911.

== Directing credits ==
- Another World (December 1994 - December 1998)
- One Life to Live (1990–2013)
- Caged Innocence (TV movie)

== Awards and nominations ==
Daytime Emmy Award

- Nominated, 2007, directing team, One Life to Live
- Nominated, 2004, directing team, One Life to Live
