= Paper Flower (film) =

- Directed by: Brent Ryan Green
- Written by: Jeff Goldberg
- Produced by: Brent Ryan Green; Jeff Goldberg
- Starring: Anna Ishibashi; Ayami Kakiuchi
- Cinematography: Thomas Marvel
- Edited by: Aki Mizutani
- Music by: Aska Matsumiya
- Distributed by: Toy Gun Films
- Release date: February 2011
- Running time: 21 minutes
- Countries: Japan; United States
- Language: Japanese

Paper Flower is a short narrative film by Toy Gun Films that was premiered in Tokyo in February 2011. It was first shown in the U.S. at the Beverly Hills Film Festival on April 8, 2011. Paper Flower was directed by Brent Ryan Green, written by Jeff Goldberg, and produced by Toy Gun Films Toy Gun Films The cinematographer was Thomas Marvel and the music was composed by Aska Matsumiya Your Enemies Friends.

The film was inspired by a collection of true stories surrounding the issue of Enjo-kōsai (援助交際) or compensated dating and materialism that families face throughout Tokyo. Paper Flower focuses on the friendship of two childhood friends growing up in Tokyo where a casual form of prostitution known as compensated dating has become a disturbing trend. When they each experience heartbreaking losses, they are forced to decide how much of themselves they are willing to give in order to find true love.

== Plot ==
Asuka (Anna Ishibashi) and her best childhood friend, Michi (Ayami Kakiuchi), are young girls who live in the fast, savvy city of Tokyo, where being fashionable is not a social cliché, but a social requirement. Although the girls are leading two different kinds of lives, they find they must decide how much of themselves they must give up in order to find true love. The film follows the story of Asuka as she compromises herself in order to get what she thinks she wants, but instead, she finds something entirely different that she never knew she wanted or needed.

== Cast ==
- Anna Ishibashi - Asuka
- Ayami Kakiuchi - Michi
- Yasunari Takeshima - Toru (Asuka’s father)
- Asuka Kurosawa - Reiko (Asuka’s mother)
- Kenichi Takitoh - Kiyoshi (Michi’s father)
- Mariko Tsutsui - Masami (Michi’s mother)
- Yoshiyuki Morishita - Ukita (Businessman)
- Jurie Takeda - Young Asuka
- Shunya Tajima - Adult Man

== Festivals ==
Paper Flower has been officially selected for:

- Beverly Hills Film Festival 2010
- DeadCENTER Film Festival
- New Filmmakers Film Festival
- Showbiz Expo
- Mosaic Film Festival of Los Angeles - won 1st Place of Best Short Film and Audience Choice Awards
- The Film Festival of Colorado
- Breckenridge Film Festival - won Best Spiritual
- The Indie Fest - won Merit Award for Short Film and Direction
- San Antonio Film Festival
- Transforming Stories International Christian Film Festival
- Indie Gathering International Film Festival - won 4th Place
- Accolade Competition - won Award of Merit for Short Film
- Texas International Film Festival
- Ruby Mountain Film Festival
- 3rd Inigo International Film Festival
- HollyShorts Film Festival
- Williamsburg International Film Festival
- Route 66 International Film Festival
- SoCal Film Festival - Honorable Mention
- Heartland Truly Moving Pictures Film Festival
- Miami Short Film Festival
- Tallgrass International Film Festival
