= Brent Ryan Green =

American film director

Brent Ryan Green (born March 19, 1984) is an American film director and producer.

== Career ==
Green has produced several films, the first of which was Beyond the Gates of Splendor (2002). In January 2009, Green founded Toy Gun Films with Jeff Goldberg and in 2011, had his directorial debut with the 2011 short film Paper Flower. He followed this film up with two additional shorts, Half Good Killer and Running Deer, the latter of which starred Booboo Stewart. Running Deer was filmed in Oklahoma and screened at the DeadCENTER Film Festival and won the Special Jury Prize for short film.

His feature film directorial debut, The Veil, was released two years later in 2013. Filming for The Veil took place in Oklahoma, a location that Green chose specifically while developing the project.

== Filmography ==
Year	Film	Director	Producer	Notes
2002	Beyond the Gates of Splendor		Yes	Also production manager
2005	End of the Spear		Yes	Co-producer; also stunt double
2010	Heaven's Rain		Yes	Executive producer
2010	En Tus Manos		Yes	Short film
2011	Paper Flower	Yes	Yes	Short film
2012	Half Good Killer	Yes	Yes	Short film
2013	Running Deer	Yes	Yes	Short film
2014	God's Not Dead		Yes	Executive producer
2015	Do You Believe?		Yes	Executive producer
2015	Janey Makes a Play		Yes	Documentary
2016	Silence		Yes	Associate producer
2017	The Veil	Yes	Yes	Also actor (Young Evil Emperor)
2018	I Can Only Imagine		Yes	Co-producer
2021	Wild Indian		Yes	Executive producer
2021	God's Not Dead: We the People		Yes	
2021	American Underdog		Yes	Co-producer
2024	Reagan		Yes	Executive producer, second unit director
