= List of In the House episodes =

In the House is an American television sitcom that originally aired on NBC from April 10, 1995 and moved to UPN after its second season. The show starred LL Cool J as Marion Hill a former professional football player with the Oakland Raiders. Because of his financial predicament, he is forced to rent out most of the rooms in his house to newly divorced single mother Jackie Warren (Debbie Allen) and her two children, Tiffany (Maia Campbell) and Austin (Jeffery Wood). In the third season, Jackie and Austin move to Nashville, leaving Tiffany to stay with Marion in order to finish school in Los Angeles; Marion purchases a sports rehabilitation facility with the boisterous Tonia (Kim Wayans) and the pompous Maxwell (Alfonso Ribeiro), leading to the trio's attempts to work together despite their clashing personalities.

== Series overview ==
Season	Episodes	Originally released		
Season	Episodes	First released	Last released	Network
1	6	April 10, 1995	May 15, 1995	NBC
2	20	September 18, 1995	May 13, 1996	NBC
3	22	August 26, 1996	May 19, 1997	UPN
4	22	August 25, 1997	April 7, 1998	UPN
5	6	August 3, 1999	August 11, 1999	Syndication

== Episodes ==
=== Season 1 (1995) ===
No. overall	No. in season	Title	Directed by	Written by	Original release date	Prod. code	Viewers (millions)
1	1	"Getting to Know You"	James Widdoes	Winifred Hervey	April 10, 1995	61251	16.0
When Jackie Warren's husband goes through a mid-life crisis and announces that he is having an affair, she decides to make a new life for herself and Jackie is going through a divorce. Once a wealthy socialite, she enters the work force for the first time and gets her own place to live. Jackie squeezes into a less-than-lavish but charming house owned by injured pro football player Marion Hill, whose stellar career was ruined by a freak accident. To cover expenses while he trains for a comeback, he moves into the apartment above his garage and rents his main house to Jackie and her two children. The kitchen becomes common ground for the tenants and their landlord. With only two years of law school as her experience, Jackie is hired as a legal assistant by Heather Comstock, a young no-nonsense power attorney. While she's working, Jackie must find someone to take care of her children. Despite her misgivings about Marion, Jackie's overly dramatic teenaged daughter Tiffany and her brainy young son Austin convince her to give him a chance.
2	2	"Female Trouble"	James Widdoes	Jeffrey Duteil	April 17, 1995	61252	15.8
When a female bully at school harasses Austin, he asks Jackie and Marion for advice. Unfortunately, he must choose between two opposing philosophies: Jackie says he should protect himself and fight back, while Marion advocates a non-violent approach. Meanwhile, Tiffany fights with her boyfriend on the telephone and agonizes about whether to call him back or wait for him to call her.
3	3	"Birthday Presence"	Tony Singletary	Danny Smith	April 24, 1995	61253	17.4
Jackie is out of the house celebrating her son Austin's birthday, so Marion plans a reunion with his ex-girlfriend, who thinks he still has an active football career. But Jackie unexpectedly brings the party back to the house and upsets Marion's romantic evening. Meanwhile, Heather dates a single father and asks Jackie's advice on bonding with his daughter.
4	4	"Once Again, with Feeling"	Gil Junger	Bryan Winter	May 1, 1995	61254	13.7
It's been nearly 20 years since Jackie went on a date, but Marion tries to get her to meet men at a popular night club. However, when Marion's former grade school football coach comes for a visit, Jackie finds an eligible bachelor in her own living room.
5	5	"The Lost Weekend (a.k.a. The Last Weekend)"	Asaad Kelada	Winifred Hervey	May 8, 1995	61256	14.5
Austin persuades Jackie to continue the family tradition of visiting their mountain cabin at the beginning of the spring season. But when Jackie's car breaks down, Marion must drive them. Their plans are thrown into further turmoil by Jackie's ex-husband Milton, who brought his new young bride to the cabin for a romantic weekend.
6	6	"Hats Off"	Asaad Kelada	Jeffrey Duteil	May 15, 1995	61255	15.6
Jackie and Heather help Marion get an audition for a sportscaster job on a local news show. Meanwhile, Tiffany participates in a school charity drive to get closer to a cute classmate. Also, Austin asks his family to help him prepare for a school spelling competition.

=== Season 2 (1995–96) ===
No. overall	No. in season	Title	Directed by	Written by	Original release date	Prod. code	Viewers (millions)
7	1	"Dog Catchers"	Gil Junger	Bill Boulware	September 18, 1995	61604	14.4
Marion and his friend Carlton Banks discover that a boy is dating both Tiffany and Carlton's little sister, Ashley, at the same time, so they decide to teach the duplicitous guy a lesson in respect. Absent: Lisa Arrindell Anderson as Heather Comstock
8	2	"Crush Groove"	Gil Junger	Jeffrey Duteil	September 25, 1995	61608	13.6
Marion takes a liking to an attractive neighbor, with whom Austin has been spending some time; meanwhile, Jackie delivers pizzas to earn extra money, and Heather practices hugging after her therapist tells her to be more friendly.
9	3	"The Gambler"	Gil Junger	Lore Kimbrough	October 2, 1995	61606	13.3
Austin becomes a prodigy at poker. Meanwhile, Heather manipulates Jackie into planning Heather's 30th birthday party.
10	4	"The Final Cut"	Gil Junger	Danny Smith	October 9, 1995	61605	14.7
When Austin finds out that Marion is coaching a kids' football league with Marion's former grade school football coach Sam Wilson, he tries to impress Marion by making the team. Meanwhile, Tiffany and her friend Rachel (Bianca Lawson) are secretly hoping to dance on Soul Train.
11	5	"Daddy's Home"	Gil Junger	Winifred Hervey	October 16, 1995	61601	14.6
Jackie's ex-husband Milton's new wife throws him out when he accidentally says Jackie's name during sex. Jackie refuses to allow him to live in her part of the home, but Marion lets Milton sleep in his room. Milton drives Marion crazy with his annoying habits, which include snoring. The next day Marion tries to force Milton back to Sasha. When Milton rents a romantic hotel suite, Marion calls Sasha to persuade her to reconcile with Milton. She refuses, causing a dejected Milton to lock himself in the hotel bathroom. After Marion calls Jackie at work, she rushes over and persuades Milton to come out of the bathroom. Grateful for her support, Milton hugs Jackie and he sprains his back. They roll off the bed when she tries to fix it. Sasha and Marion arrive at this point. Sasha gets the wrong idea and doesn't want to see Milton again. Marion lets Milton stay, but his annoying qualities, including snoring, seem to carry to Austin, so Marion goes sleepless. He soon begs Jackie to go and talk to Sasha. Sasha is tired of being compared to Jackie. Jackie helps Sasha realize that while Milton and Jackie don't hate each other, they are nowhere near love. She reveals that Milton gave up his family for Sasha, showing his care. She takes him back. Absent: Lisa Arrindell Anderson as Heather Comstock
12	6	"Futile Attraction"	Asaad Kelada	Danny Smith	October 23, 1995	61607	14.8
Marion bakes cookies for his physical therapist, Tonia, to thank her for helping him heal. But she wrongly thinks he is in love with her and aggressively pursues him by sneaking into his room wearing sexy lingerie. Meanwhile, Jackie wants Tiffany to join a fancy social club managed by the snobbish Mrs. Mason. Mrs. Mason and the other ladies come over to interview Tiffany, and they almost witness Marion leading the scantily clad Tonia out of the house. Later, Jackie agrees to help Marion convince Tonia that he is in love with someone else. Marion takes Tonia to an expensive restaurant. Jackie comes in, kisses Marion passionately and says that they are in love. Tonia dejectedly leaves. Unfortunately, Mrs. Mason was sitting behind them and witnessed the entire incident. Tiffany is glad to be rejected by the social club.
13	7	"Sister Act: the Episode"	Greg Antonacci	Bill Boulware	November 6, 1995	61602	16.0
Rowena, Jackie's adventurous sister, fools Marion and Clayton into a wild, wild trip with her and Jackie, which leads them into using their survival skills. Special Guest Star: Phylicia Rashad as Rowena
14	8	"Nanna Don't Play"	Terri McCoy	Walter Allen Bennett Jr.	November 13, 1995	61609	14.8
Milton begs Jackie to pretend that the house is their happy home for his visiting grandmother, but Marion isn't too happy when Nanna begins to give him orders. Elsewhere, Marion's idea to throw his old friend Darryl a bachelor party lands Darryl in hot water with his bride-to-be. Special Guest Stars: Isabel Sanford as Nanna, Jimmie Walker as Darryl, and Anthony Anderson as Eddie
15	9	"Boyz II Men II Women"	Paul Miller	Jeffrey Duteil	December 4, 1995	61610	12.9
Marion takes it like a man when his old friend Kevin discloses his new profession as a female impersonator. Guest Star: RuPaul as Kevin
16	10	"Christmas Party"	Asaad Kelada	Winifred Hervey	December 11, 1995	61612	14.3
Tiffany and Austin want to bring the family together for Christmas, and that includes a visit from their great-grandparents. Special Guest Stars: Estelle Harris as Mrs. Claus, Isabel Sanford as Nanna, and Sherman Hemsley as Buster
17	11	"Do the Right Thing"	Gil Junger	Walter Allen Bennett Jr.	January 1, 1996	61603	16.5
After Austin gives Marion computer-aided financial advice, a computer mix-up gives Marion a large sum of money.
18	12	"Come Back, Kid"	Paul Miller	Danny Smith	January 8, 1996	61611	16.3
Marion's professional football comeback and since he passed his physical that means he is off injured reserve and comes back to play for the raiders and means it's time for Jackie to start thinking about moving out.
19	13	"To Die For"	Asaad Kelada	Danny Smith	January 15, 1996	61614	14.1
Marion's cousin, Curtis, wants to market Marion's health drink but not without complications. Austin tries to act like Marion in order to win friends. Tiffany considers changing her name.
20	14	"Love on a One-Way Street"	Asaad Kelada	Bill Boulware	January 22, 1996	61613	14.7
While giving Tiffany driving lessons, Marion crashes into a vehicle driven by a policewoman named Alex (Robin Givens) who he falls in love with. Austin has girl problems.
21	15	"My Crazy Valentine"	Asaad Kelada	Jeffrey Duteil	February 12, 1996	61615	13.5
Jackie becomes intrigued and attracted to the handsome handyman named Russell who is hired by Marion to fix his broken hot tub. Austin unknowingly gives his girlfriend Erica Jackie's wedding ring as a gift. Marion spends Valentine's Day with Alex, but their romance becomes complicated when Tonia, Alex's cousin and Marion's physical trainer, surprises him and reveals that she has a crush on him. Meanwhile, Tiffany has two dates.
22	16	"Three the Hard Way"	Asaad Kelada	Winifred Hervey	February 19, 1996	61616	13.3
Marion finds it hard to believe Tonia when she tells him that Alex is seeing someone else. Tiffany ruins Jackie's new dress.
23	17	"A Major Problem"	Asaad Kelada	Jeffrey Duteil	February 26, 1996	61617	14.0
Marion doesn't see eye to eye with his dad.
24	18	"Home Again"	Asaad Kelada	Vince Cheung and Ben Montanio	April 22, 1996	61618	13.4
Jackie is promoted to the New York office, which means Marion is short one tenant – enter Tonia.
25	19	"Close Encounters of the Worst Kind"	Asaad Kelada	Katie Ford	May 6, 1996	61619	12.4
Marion feels like he's moved on emotionally from his college pals; new neighbor Tonia reports seeing an alien; Tiffany has a date.
26	20	"Hoop Screams"	Asaad Kelada	Walter Allen Bennett Jr.	May 13, 1996	61620	11.0
In the season finale When Marion coordinates a charity basketball tournament, Jackie and Tonia organize a team to challenge Marion, whose teammates include a tall, athletic postman. Marion lets Milton coach the guys' team. Tiffany dates a young rap musician who influences her language and wardrobe. Guest stars: Fred Roggin and Reggie Theus as themselves; Leslie Jones and Katrina McClain Johnson as Tonia's basketball team.

=== Season 3 (1996–97) ===
No. overall	No. in season	Title	Directed by	Written by	Original release date	Prod. code	Viewers (millions)
27	1	"The Real World"	Peter Baldwin	Bob Burris & Michael Ware	August 26, 1996	027	6.6
After Jackie moves to Nashville with her son Austin, Marion plans to take over the sports clinic after finding out football career is over with career ending injury, but others have the same idea.
28	2	"Mother of Invention"	Peter Baldwin	Rob Edwards	September 2, 1996	028	4.2
Tonia and Maxwell come up with a get rich quick scheme - the "Butt Ball" - to help fund their sports clinic. All they need is a celebrity endorser to get the ball rolling. When Olympic Gold-Medalist Jackie Joyner-Kersee drops out, they turn to their partner, ex-pro football star Marion, to use his star power to step in and save the day. Guest Star: Jackie Joyner-Kersee
29	3	"I Only Have You for Eyes"	Peter Baldwin	Michelle Jones	September 9, 1996	029	4.1
Overwhelmed by Tonia's demands on their time, Marion and Maxwell conspire to get themselves off her daily social calendar by fixing her up with Gary, the water delivery man. But when the first date lands him in the emergency room, the guys have trouble convincing Gary to go out with Tonia a second time. With the promise to 100 free gym hours sweetening the pot, Gary agrees to see Tonia again, and Marion and Maxwell decide to go along to make sure things go smoothly. But Tonia is on to their plan and has one of her own.
30	4	"Bury the Hatchet"	Peter Baldwin	Gary Hardwick	September 16, 1996	030	4.7
Marion helps an obnoxious football player facing a career-ending injury. Meanwhile, Tiffany convinces Tonia to flirt with a client.
31	5	"Maxwell Said Knock You Out"	Madeline Cripe	Art Everett	September 23, 1996	031	4.3
Heated competition between Marion and Maxwell results in Los Angeles Lakers player Eddie Jones, a prospective client, being knocked out cold.
32	6	"Record Breaking Time"	Kim Friedman	Gary Hardwick	September 30, 1996	032	4.4
A hotshot college football star poised to break one of Marion's last standing records catches Tiffany's eye. But Tonia has a bad feeling about the young man's intentions – feelings Marion initially discounts. Meanwhile, Maxwell scrutinizes a parade of would-be receptionists.
33	7	"Kindergarten Doc"	Kim Friedman	Gary Hardwick	October 14, 1996	033	4.9
Rodney reconsiders Maxwell as his career role model for school. Meanwhile, Marion coaches Tonia for a charity boxing match.
34	8	"The Curse of Hill House"	John Tracy	Art Everett	October 28, 1996	035	5.7
Maxwell insults a self-proclaimed witch, who casts a spell on him, while on a double date.
35	9	"One Love (a.k.a. Two Guys One Girl)"	John Tracy	Cynthia Harris & Raynelle Swilling	November 4, 1996	036	5.6
Marion and Maxwell compete for the attention of a dance instructor. Meanwhile, Tiffany pretends to be Jamaican to impress a boy.
36	10	"Pledge Allegiance"	John Tracy	Ellen L. Fogle	November 11, 1996	034	4.5
When Tiffany's social life causes truancy trouble, Marion plots to make her party until she can party no more.
37	11	"This is a Test"	John Tracy	Rob Edwards & Ellen L. Fogle	November 18, 1996	038	4.5
Maxwell's girlfriend Shanna is more interested in her dog than in him. Marion crams for a physical therapist certification exam.
38	12	"The Max Who Came to Dinner"	John Tracy	Sheryl North	November 25, 1996	037	4.9
It appears that in the eye of Marion's grandma, he can do nothing right...whereas Maxwell can do nothing wrong.
39	13	"Saint Marion"	John Tracy	Gary Hardwick	January 13, 1997	039	4.73
While volunteering at a soup kitchen, Marion is believed to be destitute. Tonia teaches her friend Henry how to be cool to impress his girlfriend, but he becomes attracted to Tonia.
40	14	"Dial 'M' for Marion"	Andrew Tsao	Brian Lane	January 20, 1997	040	4.56
Marion falls for a woman whose phone messages he inadvertently receives. Tonia and Henry face complications in their relationship.
41	15	"You're the One"	Andrew Tsao	Ellen L. Fogle	February 3, 1997	041	4.17
Marion welcomes Evander Holyfield into his home as the two prepare for a banquet honoring Marion at which they hope to get a big donation for a children's charity. Unfortunately, eternal trouble makers Tonia and Max manage to get invited to the event as well. Meanwhile, Tiffany learns that she may lose her bid for homecoming queen because she scored high on her advanced placement test.
42	16	"Love Wars"	Andrew Tsao	Bob Burris & Michael Ware	February 10, 1997	042	4.33
Amber, the property manager who's responsible for rent increases in the office building, once had an affair with Marion. Tonia has a secret admirer.
43	17	"Marion Strikes Back"	Andrew Tsao	Cynthia R. Harris & Raynelle Swilling	February 17, 1997	043	5.00
Marion shows that he's free of his attraction to Amber by dating a woman from a company making a commercial for the clinic.
44	18	"Return of the Stiletto"	Madeline Cripe	Michelle Jones	February 24, 1997	044	5.42
Marion's effort to avoid the "I love you" land mine with Amber blows up in his face. Meanwhile, Max believes that Tonia's boyfriend Henry may be giving secret information about their clinic to another rival clinic.
45	19	"Fore Armed"	Madeline Cripe	Michelle Jones	April 28, 1997	045	4.41
Marion and Maxwell organize a celebrity miniature-golf tournament.
46	20	"Abstinence Makes the Heart Grow Fonder"	John Tracy	Karin Kelly	May 5, 1997	046	3.85
Marion vows to abstain from romantic liaisons as a mode of spiritual cleansing.
47	21	"The Retreat Story"	Alfonso Ribeiro	Lisa Marie Petersen	May 12, 1997	047	3.57
Marion weighs an offer to endorse orthopedic shoes for seniors while on his annual spiritual retreat.
48	22	"Cliffhanger"	John Tracy	Art Everett	May 19, 1997	048	3.45
Tonia and Maxwell challenge Marion to tackle his acrophobia by rock climbing. Meanwhile, Carl escorts Tiffany to her senior prom after a major conflict occurs.

=== Season 4 (1997–98) ===
No. overall	No. in season	Title	Directed by	Written by	Original release date	Prod. code	Viewers (millions)
49	1	"Earthquake"	John Tracy	Gary Hardwick	August 25, 1997	049	3.72
Marion, Tonia and Maxwell's partnership falls apart in the aftermath of an earthquake that leaves the sports clinic in ruins. Meanwhile, Tiffany reconsiders going to college.
50	2	"Men in the Black"	John Tracy	Art Everett	September 1, 1997	050	3.32
Seeking an upgrade, Maxwell urges Marion to date the contractor who's fixing up the clinic. Meanwhile, Tonia dates Los Angeles Lakers basketball star Derek Fisher.
51	3	"Tito's in the House"	John Tracy	Teri Schaffer	September 8, 1997	051	4.01
Marion gives his pal Tito a job at the sports clinic, where he's a real piece of work for Max and Tonia. Meanwhile, Tonia and her boyfriend Derek face a complication in their romance.
52	4	"The Second Coming of Marion Hill"	John Tracy	Mike Costa	September 15, 1997	052	4.01
Marion makes a brief appearance during Tonia's meeting with an ad agency, and lands an underwear-modeling gig. Meanwhile, Tiffany decides to move out and Maxwell works hard for a date.
53	5	"Cruise (Part 1)"	John Tracy	Bob Burris & Michael Ware	September 22, 1997	053	3.82
The gang (including Tiffany, who stows away) goes on a cruise after Maxwell books Marion to give a speech.
54	6	"Cruise (Part 2)"	John Tracy	Michelle Jones	September 29, 1997	054	3.98
Marion and Maxwell's on-shore escapade continues, while out-at-sea, Mercedes frets that Maxwell has ditched her.
55	7	"Pranks (a.k.a. Flirting With the Darkside)"	John Tracy	Jerry Colker	October 13, 1997	055	4.70
Rivalry with a clinic across the street results in a series of pranks. Meanwhile, Tiffany, Carl and Raynelle are having trouble with trying to finish their psychology papers.
56	8	"Tonia's Big Break"	Madeline Cripe	Sheryl North	October 27, 1997	057	4.04
Tonia's motivational speech to juvenile female inmates inspires a prison break. Meanwhile, Tito's determined to manage a singing group.
57	9	"The Stuff That Dreams are Made Of"	John Tracy	Gary Hardwick	November 3, 1997	056	3.58
Marion and the gang reluctantly participate in a dream therapy session.
58	10	"When Marion Met Natalie"	John Tracy	Cynthia Harris & Raynelle Swilling	November 10, 1997	058	4.61
Marion provides living space for Natalie, a girl from the old neighborhood who's all grown up now.
59	11	"Tiffany's School Daze (part 1)"	Alfonso Ribeiro	Mike Costa	November 17, 1997	059	4.99
Tiffany is attracted to an older grad student.
60	12	"Tiffany's School Daze (part 2)"	John Tracy	Gary Hardwick	November 24, 1997	060	5.07
Marion advises Tiffany to steer clear of Graham. He and Tonia also scheme to reunite Maxwell and Mercedes.
61	13	"God is in the House"	John Tracy	Michelle Jones	December 16, 1997	061	3.80
At Christmastime, Tonia's sister, Yolanda, voices to Marion her doubts that the ministry is her true calling. Yolanda Adams guest stars.
62	14	"Say Anything"	John Tracy	Teri Schaffer	January 12, 1998	062	4.17
After a breakup, Marion is sued for damages over the "little lies" he uttered during the relationship.
63	15	"The Tennis Story"	John Tracy	David Wyatt	January 19, 1998	063	3.82
Marion and Natalie have overwhelming urges for each other during a charity tennis tournament.
64	16	"The Marion Rules"	John Tracy	Art Everett	February 16, 1998	064	4.29
Marion and Natalie establish relationship rules; Mercedes proposes to Maxwell; Tiffany is the birthing coach of a former classmate with a grudge.
65	17	"Working Overtime (Part 1)"	Alfonso Ribeiro	Lena Charles & Teri Schaffer	February 23, 1998	065	4.02
To make clinic rent money, Marion rebuilds a youth center, where he confronts a bad guy from his past.
66	18	"Working Overtime (Part 2)"	Madeline Cripe	Cynthia R. Harris & Raynelle Swilling	March 2, 1998	066	3.78
Marion wants to get Blake out from under Eddie's bad influence.
67	19	"One House and a Baby"	Madeline Cripe	Lisa Marie Petersen	March 17, 1998	067	2.78
Tiffany helps out her single-mom friend Shara. Meanwhile, Marion's paternal feelings worry Natalie.
68	20	"All's Fair in Love and War"	Sheldon Epps	Jerry Colker	March 24, 1998	068	3.78
Marion denies having feelings for Natalie, as he and Tito throw a bachelor party for Maxwell.
69	21	"Mr. Hill Goes to New York"	Alfonso Ribeiro	Sarah Cottrell Stokes	March 31, 1998	069	1.96
After seeing Gabrielle and Mark kissing passionately, Tiffany confronts the amorous couple about their betrayal. Marion visits his grandmother in Queens, and also sees Natalie. Meanwhile, Mercedes' wealthy ex-boyfriend, Evan Burnett, returns.
70	22	"My Pest Friend's Wedding"	Ted Lange	Gary Hardwick	April 7, 1998	070	3.32
Maxwell and Mercedes's marriage is jeopardized when their parents bicker on their wedding day. Meanwhile, Marion considers popping the question to Natalie. James Avery and Daphne Maxwell Reid (who previously played Ribero's character Carlton's parents on The Fresh Prince of Bel-Air guest star as Maxwell's parents) and Joseph Marcell (who played Geoffrey the Butler on the show) guests stars. Note: After this episode, the show went on a year-long hiatus.

=== Season 5 (1999) ===
No. overall	No. in season	Title	Directed by	Written by	Original release date	Prod. code
71	1	"Not as Good as It Gets"	Ted Lange	Gary Hardwick	August 3, 1999	63051
Marion's life hits a crossroads when he begins to fret over whether he and Maxwell should sell their clinic while Tonia becomes an athlete for the WNBA. Meanwhile, Carl and Raynelle move in with Marion and Tiffany temporarily, but the three friends soon regret the whole idea.
72	2	"There's Something About Tiffany"	Ted Lange	Cynthia Harris & Raynelle Swilling	August 4, 1999	63052
Tiffany and Graham's relationship heats up while Marion is introduced to Valerie's inquisitive daughter Brianna, who investigates him when they meet. Also, Marion's nana pays him a visit and explains to her grandson that she's getting engaged and Mercedes and Maxwell face problems in the bedroom. Last Appearance: Maia Campbell as Tiffany Warren
73	3	"How Nana Got Her Groove Back"	Richard Steir	Lena Charles & Teri Schaffer Hicks	August 5, 1999	63053
Marion's suspicions about Nana's fiancee Ted causes the relationship to collapse on the eve of their wedding. Also, a letter left from Tiffany on her honeymoon reveals that she has eloped with Graham.
74	4	"Cornbread, Marion and Me"	Richard Steir	Cynthia R. Harris & Raynelle Swilling	August 6, 1999	63054
Marion accidentally kills Brianna's goldfish. Meanwhile, Maxwell tries to reconcile with Mercedes with the help of a counselor. Raynelle's new boyfriend becomes too clingy.
75	5	"Guest Dad"	Ted Lange	Lena Charles & Teri Schaffer	August 10, 1999	63055
Maxwell and Mercedes struggle to conceive a child while Marion encounters Valerie's ex-husband Justin, who has plans for reconciliation.
76	6	"Out the House"	Ted Lange	Gary Hardwick	August 11, 1999	63056
Marion awaits news on an NFL franchise. Carl and Raynelle try to deceive their parents while staying at Marion's house. Maxwell and Mercedes are finally expecting. Marion reconciles with Valerie and plans to move to New York with her & Brianna. Marion leaves the house to Carl and Raynelle.
