= Back Alley Film Productions =

TV production company in Canada

- Industry: Television production
- Genre: Television
- Founded: 1989
- Founder: Janis Lundman; Adrienne Mitchell
- Headquarters: Toronto, Ontario, Canada

Back Alley Film Productions is a television production company founded by Janis Lundman and Adrienne Mitchell and based in Toronto, Ontario, and Montreal, Quebec Canada. Founded in 1989, Back Alley is a creator and producer of original content for television with programming available in more than 120 countries worldwide.

Back Alley is currently producing Coroner starring Serinda Swan for CBC. Coroner premiered in January 2019 as the highest-rated new drama series on CBC in more than four years, delivering an average audience of more than one million viewers. It also premiered as the highest-ever rated launch in the UK for Universal TV. Coroner was picked up for season two in March 2019.

Back Alley also recently produced Bellevue starring Anna Paquin for CBC and WGN America. Other productions include Played, a 1-hour police drama series for CTV and Bomb Girls, a series that followed the lives of women working in a munitions factory during WWII for Global Television. Starring Meg Tilly the series won the Outstanding Drama award at the 2013 Gracie Awards and was nominated for the prestigious Rockie Award at the Banff Television Festival. Back Alley also produced the Movie of the Week, Bomb Girls: Facing the Enemy, which won the 2015 Canadian Screen Award for Best TV Movie or Mini-Series. Back Alley's other credits include three seasons of the award-winning Durham County, which has sold to over 100 countries internationally; the women's erotica series, Bliss; the hip hop series Drop the Beat and Straight Up with Sarah Polley.

== Productions ==
=== Television series ===
- Coroner
- Bellevue
- Played
- Bomb Girls & Bomb Girls: Facing the Enemy (MOW)
- Durham County
- Bliss
- Drop the Beat
- Straight Up

=== Non-fiction ===
- Lawn and Order
- Talk 19
- Talk 16

== Awards and nominations ==
Mitchell and Lundman won the Production Award for Excellence from Women in Film & Television - Toronto.

In 2017, Mitchell was honoured by the Toronto ACTRA Women's Committee. She received the Nell Shipman Award for her efforts in advancing gender equity in the entertainment industry.

=== Bomb Girls - Facing the Enemy ===
- Canadian Screen Awards
  - Best Dramatic Miniseries or TV Movie - Janis Lundman, Adrienne Mitchell, Michael Prupas
  - Best Performance by an Actress in a Leading Role in a Dramatic Program or Mini-Series - Jodi Balfour
  - Best Best Performance by an Actress in a Featured Supporting Role in a Dramatic Program or Series - Ali Liebert
- Canadian Screen Award Nominations
  - Best Achievement in Makeup - Eva Coudouloux, Katerina Chovanec
  - Best Photography in a Dramatic Series - Eric Cayla
- Leo Awards
  - Best Supporting Performance by a Male, Television Movie - Antonio Cupo
- Directors Guild of Canada Award Nominations
  - Best Television Movie/Miniseries
  - Best Production Design, Television Movie/Miniseries - Aidan Leroux
  - Best Picture Editing, Television Movie/Miniseries - Tad Seaborn
  - Best Sound Editing, Television Movie/Miniseries - Peter Lopata, Jill Purdy

=== Played ===
- Canadian Screen Awards
  - Best Cross Platform Project, Fiction - Played: Interference
- Leo Award Nominations
  - Best Supporting Performance by a Female, Dramatic Series - Agam Darshi
  - Best Guest Performance by a Male, Dramatic Series - Serge Houde
  - Best Guest Performance by a Female, Dramatic Series - Camille Sullivan
  - Best Guest Performance by a Female, Dramatic Series - Kacey Rohl

=== Bomb Girls - Season 2 ===
- Canadian Screen Awards
  - Best Costume Design - Debra Hanson
  - Best Achievement in Casting - Lisa Parasyn, Jon Comerford
- Canadian Screen Award Nominations
  - Best Dramatic Series
  - Best Performance by an Actress in a Continuing Leading Dramatic Role - Meg Tilly
  - Best Achievement in Casting - Eva Coudouloux, Katerina Chovanec
  - Best Photography in a Dramatic Program or Series - Eric Cayla
- Directors Guild of Canada Award Nominations
  - Best Production Design Television Series - Aidan Leroux
- Leo Award Nominations
  - Best Supporting Performance by a Male, Dramatic Series - Brett Dier

=== Bomb Girls - Season 1 ===
- Canadian Screen Awards
  - Best Performance by an Actress in a Continuing Leading Dramatic Role - Meg Tilly
  - Best Costume Design - Joanne Hansen
  - Best Production Design or Art Direction in a Fiction Program or Series - Aidan Leroux
- Canadian Screen Award Nominations
  - Best Dramatic Series
  - Best Cross Platform Project, Fiction - Bomb Girls Interactive
- Rockie Award Nomination
  - Continuing Series Programs, Scripted
- Directors Guild of Canada Award Nominations
  - Best Production Design Television Series - Aidan Leroux

=== Durham County – Season 3 ===
- Gemini Awards
  - Best Achievement in Casting - Marissa Richmond, Libby Goldstein, Andrea Kenyon, Suzanne Smith, Randi Wells
- Gemini Award Nominations
  - Best Direction in a Dramatic Series - Charles Biname
  - Best Sound in a Dramatic Series - Steve Moore, Alex Bullick, Yann Cleary, Christian Cooke, Andrea Higgins, Jill Purdy, Marilee Yorston
  - Best Performance by an Actor in a Continuing Lead Dramatic Role - Hugh Dillon
  - Best Performance by an Actor in a Guest Role, Dramatic Series - Michael Nardone
  - Best Performance by an Actress in Featured Supporting Role in a Dramatic Series - Benedicte Decary
- 2011 WorldFest-Houston Remi Awards
  - Winner of a Gold 2011 Worldfest Remi Award in the category of TV Series - Dramatic.
- 2011 Monte-Carlo TV Festival Awards
  - Nominated for 5 awards including: Outstanding International Producers (Janis Lundman, Adrienne Mitchell, Michael Prupas), Outstanding Actor (Hugh Dillon, Michael Nardone) and Outstanding Actress (Hélène Joy, Laurence Leboeuf).
- 2011 WorldFest-Houston Remi Awards
  - Nominated for a 2011 Worldfest Remi Award in the category of TV Series - Dramatic.
- Interactive Media 2010 Award
  - Best in Class - Television in recognition of Durham County - Season 3 Website www.durhamcounty.ca
- WGC Screenwriting Award
  - Script for "Distance, Hunting and Home", written by Laurie Finstad Knizhnik, was chosen as a finalist

=== Durham County – Season 2 ===
- Gemini Awards
  - Best Achievement in Main Title Design - Kevin Chandoo
  - Best Achievement in Make-Up - Eva Coudouloux and Adrien Morot
- Gemini Nominations
  - Best Dramatic Series
  - Best Direction in a Dramatic Series - Adrienne Mitchell
  - Best Performance by an Actress in a Continuing Leading Dramatic Role - Helene Joy
  - Best Achievement in Casting - Andrea Kenyon, Wendy O'Brien, Marissa Richmond, and Randi Wells
- Monte-Carlo Television Festival
  - Winner of 2010 Golden Nymph Award
  - Outstanding Actress- Michelle Forbes (Drama TV Series)
- Monte-Carlo Television Festival Nominations
  - Outstanding Actor – Hugh Dillon (Drama TV Series)
  - Outstanding International Producer – Janis Lundman, Adrienne Mitchell, Laurie Finstad Knizhnik and Michael Prupas (Drama TV Series)
- Directors Guild of Canada Award Winners
  - Best Direction- TV Series - Adrienne Mitchell
  - Best Production Design- TV Series - Donna Noonan
- Directors Guild of Canada Award Nominee
  - Best Picture Editing- TV Series
- EMPixx Awards
  - Platinum Award for Best National Cable Program in the Entertainment Category
- WorldFest – Houston International Film Festival
  - Winner of the Platinum Award - Best TV Series – Drama

=== Durham County – Season 1 ===
- Winner of 5 Canadian Gemini Awards for Best Writing in a Dramatic Series, Best Direction in a Dramatic Series, Best Performance by an Actress in a Continuing Leading Dramatic Role, Best Performance by an Actor in a Continuing Leading Dramatic Role and Best Sound in a Dramatic Series
- Winner of 2 Directors Guild of Canada Awards for Best Editing – Dramatic Series and Direction – Television Series
- Winner of CFTPA Indie Award for Best Dramatic Series
- Nominated for 7 Canadian Gemini Awards for Best Dramatic Series, Best Performance by an Actor in a Continuing Leading Dramatic Role, Best Performance by an Actress in a Featured Supporting Role in a Dramatic Series, Best Photography in a Dramatic Program or Series, Best Picture Editing in a Dramatic Program or Series, Best Costume Design and Best Achievement in Casting.
- Nominated for 2 Directors Guild of Canada Awards for Team Television Series – Drama and Production Design – Television Series
- Nominated for the Writers Guild of Canada Award for Best Writing in a Dramatic Series
- Nominated for 2 ACTRA Montreal Awards for Outstanding Female Performance and Outstanding Male Performance
- Nominated for 2 Leo Awards for Best Supporting Performance by a Female in a Dramatic Series and Best Supporting Performance by a Male in a Dramatic Series.

=== Bliss ===
- Canadian Gemini Award for Best Sound in a Dramatic Series.
- Canadian Gemini Nominations for Best Dramatic Series, Best Production Design, Best Picture Editing, Best Direction in a Dramatic Series.

=== Drop the Beat ===
- Canadian Gemini Award Nomination for Best Dramatic Series

=== Straight Up ===
- Writers Guild of Canada Award
- Canadian Gemini Award for Best Direction
- Canadian Gemini Award for Best Youth Actor
- Canadian Gemini Award Nomination for Best Dramatic Series

=== Lawn and Order ===
- Chicago Film Festival - Silver Plaque for Humour

=== Talk 16 ===
- San Francisco Film Festival Special Jury Prize
- Florida Film Festival Best Documentary Grand Jury Prize
