= Bebe Moore Campbell =

American novelist, journalist, teacher (1950–2006)

- Bebe Moore Campbell
- Born: Elizabeth Bebe Moore; February 18, 1950; Philadelphia, Pennsylvania, U.S.
- Died: November 27, 2006 (aged 56); Los Angeles, California, U.S.
- Resting place: Inglewood Park Cemetery (Inglewood, California)
- Education: University of Pittsburgh (BS)
- Occupations: Author; journalist; teacher
- Years active: 1972–2006
- Spouses: Tiko Campbell (m. 1970–1979) Ellis Gordon Jr. (m. 1984–2006)
- Children: 2, including Maia Campbell

Bebe Moore Campbell (February 18, 1950 – November 27, 2006) was an American author, journalist, and teacher. Campbell was the author of three New York Times bestsellers: Brothers and Sisters, Singing in the Comeback Choir, and What You Owe Me, which was also a Los Angeles Times "Best Book of 2001". Her other works include the novel Your Blues Ain't Like Mine, which was a New York Times Notable Book of the Year and the winner of the NAACP Image Award for Literature; her memoir, Sweet Summer: Growing Up With and Without My Dad; and her first nonfiction book, Successful Women, Angry Men: Backlash in the Two-Career Marriage. Her essays, articles, and excerpts appear in many anthologies.

== Early life and education ==
Born Elizabeth Bebe Moore, an only child, and reared in Philadelphia, Pennsylvania, she graduated from the Philadelphia High School for Girls and earned a Bachelor of Science degree in elementary education from the University of Pittsburgh. She was an honorary member of Alpha Kappa Alpha sorority.

== Career ==
Campbell's works of fiction would often relay the harmful impact that racism would inflict on individuals and their relationships. In 1992, Campbell would release her first, and most critically acclaimed novel, Your Blues Ain't Like Mine, which was described as one of the most influential books of 1992 by The New York Times Magazine. This book, which was inspired by the murder of Emmett Till in 1955, describes the impacts of this senseless crime experienced by the victim's family. Campbell, inspired by the Rodney King beating and the subsequent Los Angeles riots, wrote her second novel, titled Brothers and Sisters. This novel would be named as a The New York Times Magazine best seller just two weeks after its release in 1994.

Campbell's interest in mental health was the catalyst for her first children's book, Sometimes My Mommy Gets Angry, which was published in September 2003. This book won the National Alliance on Mental Illness (NAMI) Outstanding Literature Award for 2003. The book tells the story of how a little girl copes with being reared by her mentally ill mother. Ms. Campbell was a member of the National Alliance for the Mentally Ill and a founding member of NAMI-Inglewood. Her book 72 Hour Hold also deals with mental illness. Her first play, Even with the Madness, debuted in New York City in June 2003. This work revisited the theme of mental illness and the family.

As a journalist, Campbell wrote articles for The New York Times Magazine, The Washington Post, the Los Angeles Times, Essence, Ebony, Black Enterprise, as well as other publications. She was a regular commentator on the National Public Radio (NPR) program, Morning Edition. Campbell is known for a number of inspirational sayings, including one on the process of writing: “Discipline is the servant of inspiration.”

== Personal life and death ==
Campbell lived in Los Angeles, California, with her husband, Ellis Gordon Jr. They raised two children, a son, Ellis Gordon III, and a daughter, actress Maia Campbell, from Campbell's previous marriage to Tiko Campbell. Maia Campbell is best known for her roles as "Tiffany" on the NBC sitcom In the House and as "Cinny" in the 1999 teen comedy Trippin'.

Bebe Moore Campbell died from brain cancer, aged 56, on November 27, 2006, and was interred at Inglewood Park Cemetery, Inglewood, California.

Campbell's personal archives are housed in the Bebe Moore Campbell collection at the University of Pittsburgh Archives Service Center.

In May 2008, the US House of Representatives announced July as Bebe Moore Campbell National Minority Mental Health Awareness Month.

== Selected works ==
=== Novels ===
- Your Blues Ain't like Mine (1992)
- Brothers and Sisters (1994)
- Singing in the Comeback Choir (1998)
- What You Owe Me (2001)
- 72 Hour Hold (2005)

=== Children's books ===
- Sometimes My Mommy Gets Angry (2003)
- Stompin' at the Savoy (2006)
- I Get So Hungry (2008)

=== Non-fiction books ===
- Successful Women, Angry Men: Backlash in the Two-Career Marriage (1986)
- Sweet Summer: Growing Up with and without My Dad (1989)

=== Radio plays ===
- Sugar on the Floor
- Old Lady Shoes

=== Selected articles and essays ===
- "Staying in the Community" (1989)
- "Daddy's Girl" (1992)
- "Remember the 60's?" (1992)
- "Brothers and Sisters" (1993)
- "I Felt Rage – Then Fear" (1993)
- "Only Men Can Prevent Spousal Abuse" (1994)
- "Coming Together: Can We See Beyond the Color of Our Skin?" (1995)
- "The Boy in the River" (1999)
- "Poor Health of African Americans" (2000)
