= Played (TV series) =

- Genre: Police procedural
- Country of origin: Canada
- Original language: English
- No. of seasons: 1
- No. of episodes: 13

Production
- Running time: 43 min

Original release
- Network: CTV
- Release: October 3 – December 19, 2013

Played is a Canadian action/drama television series which premiered on CTV on October 3, 2013. The series was developed and is produced by Greg Nelson (Rookie Blue), Adrienne Mitchell (Bomb Girls) and Janis Lundman (Durham County). It follows a team of undercover police officers belonging to the fictional Covert Investigations Unit (CIU). Each episode finds them risking their lives by going undercover on short term, high intensity assignments to infiltrate and bring down criminal organizations at a fast pace. Often having to think on their feet, they find it easy to lose track of who they really are, but smooth talking and quick thinking when things go wrong usually get them out of trouble. The series was cancelled after its first season.

== Cast ==
- Vincent Walsh as Detective John Moreland
- Chandra West as Detective Sergeant Rebecca Ellis
- Lisa Marcos as Detective Constable Maria Cortez
- Dwain Murphy as Detective Constable Daniel Price
- Agam Darshi as Officer Khali Bhatt
- Adam Butcher as Officer Jesse Calvert

== Episodes ==
No.	Title	Directed by	Written by	Original release date
1	"Drugs"	Adrienne Mitchell	Greg Nelson	October 3, 2013
2	"Girls"	Charles Binamé	Greg Nelson	October 10, 2013
3	"Money"	Kelly Makin	Larry Bambrick	October 17, 2013
4	"Lawyers"	Charles Binamé	Greg Nelson & Hannah Moscovitch	October 24, 2013
5	"Guns"	Jerry Ciccoritti	Matt MacLennan	October 31, 2013
6	"Fights"	Jerry Ciccoritti	Bruce M. Smith	November 7, 2013
7	"Cars"	Rachel Talalay	Daniel Godwin & Matt MacLennan	November 14, 2013
8	"Poison"	Bradley Walsh	Hannah Moscovitch & Greg Nelson	November 21, 2013
9	"Cops"	Lee Rose	Ley Lukins	November 28, 2013
10	"Secrets"	Paul Fox	Larry Bambrick	December 5, 2013
11	"Untouchables"	Grant Harvey	Ian Carpenter	December 12, 2013
12	"Hitmen"	Andy Mikita	Matt MacLennan	December 19, 2013
13	"Revenge"	Rachel Talalay	Greg Nelson	December 19, 2013
