= Mark Taylor (Canadian actor) =

Canadian actor

- Born: March 7, 1977 (age 49); Scarborough, Ontario, Canada
- Occupation: Actor
- Years active: 1996-present

Mark Taylor (born March 7, 1977, in Scarborough, Ontario) is a Canadian actor known mainly for his roles as Eugene Donovan in Seventeen Again, Romeo in Student Bodies, and Kwest in Instant Star.

== Early life and education ==
Taylor was born and raised in Toronto, but relocated to Palm Harbor, Florida during his last two years of high school, before returning to Toronto.

Taylor studied computer engineering technology at Seneca College and graduated from Albert Campbell Collegiate Institute.

== Acting career ==
From 1997 to 2000, Taylor starred as Romeo in the teen sitcom Student Bodies. In 2000, he played Eugene Donovan in the film comedy Seventeen Again.

This was later followed by his role as Kwest in the drama TV series Instant Star from 2005 to 2008.

He also played the role of Lewis 'Lou' Young in the Canadian police drama television series Flashpoint until his character was killed off in 2009 in the 23rd episode (part of the second season).

== Filmography ==
=== Film ===
Year	Title	Role	Notes
1999	My Father's Hands	Marcus	Short
1999	All Things Fare	Main role	Short
2003	Love, Sex and Eating the Bones	Glenroy "Sweets" Lindo	
2004	Buried In The Sand: The Deception Of America	Political Commentator / Host	Documentary
2005	Cinderella Man	George	
2010	Who Is Clark Rockefeller?	Detective Mike Ruggio	
2011	Certain Prey	Officer Graff	
2014	MediDating	The Meditator	Short
2016	Blood Hunters	George	
2018	Related Destiny	Marcus LaFair	Short
2019	To Kill a Secret	Blair	Short
2025	It Feeds	Detective Otis	

=== Television ===
Year	Title	Role	Episodes
1996	Straight Up	Jeff Ronson	
1996	Due South	Punk #1	Episode: "White Men Can't Jump to Conclusions"
1997	Straight Up	Jeff Ronson	TV movie
1997	Color of Justice	Rodney	TV movie
1997–2000	Student Bodies	Romeo Carter	65 episodes
2000	Drop the Beat	Jeff	
2000	Seventeen Again	Young Grandpa Gene Donovan	TV movie
2000	The Thin Blue Lie	Principal	TV movie
2000	Our Hero	Perfectly Frank	3 episodes
2001	The Famous Jett Jackson	Mose	Episode: "Lost and Found"
2001	Doc	Johnny	2 episodes
2002	Our America	Duane	TV movie
2002	Whitewash: The Clarence Brandley Story	Ozell Brandley	TV movie
2003	Degrassi: The Next Generation	Referee	Episode: "How Soon is Now"
2003	Bliss	Paolo	Episode: "Cat Got Your Tongue"
2003	My Life as a Movie	The Photographer	TV movie
2004	2 Kings	Lead	Pilot
2005–2008	Instant Star	Kwest	40 episodes
2006	Doomstown	Mike "Twist" Twistleton	TV movie
2008–2009	Flashpoint	Lew Young	24 episodes
2009	Being Erica	Anthony Winter	3 episodes
2013	Beauty and the Beast	FBI Agent Tucker	3 episodes
2018	Memories of Christmas	Dave Beckman	TV movie
2019	Christmas Belles	Michael McKnight	TV movie
2019–2021	Frankie Drake Mysteries	Boyzey Pembroke	3 episodes
2020	Self Made	Emmett Scott	Episode: "Bootstraps"
2020	A Christmas Tree Grows in Colorado	Kevin, Firefighter	TV movie
2021–2022	Coroner	Crown Attorney Clark	Recurring
2021	Private Eyes	Rick	Episode: "In the Arms of Morpheus"
2021	Next Door Nightmare	Kyle Collins	TV movie
2021	Miracle in Motor City	Eddie Root	TV movie
2022	All American: Homecoming	Terry	2 episodes
2022–2025	Murdoch Mysteries	Isaiah Buchanan	Recurring role
2023	Little Bird	Doug	Miniseries
2023	Love & Murder: Atlanta Playboy	Ivan Cross	TV movie
2024	Beyond Black Beauty	Rashaad	

== Awards and nominations ==
Year	Work	Award	Result	Refs
2001	Drop the Beat	Gemini Award for Best Performance by an Actor in a Continuing Leading Dramatic Role	Nominated	
2007	Doomstown	Gemini Award for Best Performance by an Actor in a Featured Supporting Role in a Dramatic Program or Miniseries	Nominated	
2010	Flashpoint	Gemini Award for Best Performance by an Actor in a Featured Supporting Role in a Dramatic Series	Nominated	
