= Seventeen Again =

2000 television film by Jeffrey W. Byrd

- DVD cover
- Written by: Stewart St. John
- Directed by: Jeffrey W. Byrd
- Starring: Tia Mowry; Tamera Mowry; Tahj Mowry; Robert Hooks; Maia Campbell; Hope Clarke
- Music by: Christopher Franke; Shawn Stockman
- Country of origin: United States
- Original language: English

Production
- Producers: Brandon Bates; Darlene Mowry; Stewart St. John
- Cinematography: John P. Tarver
- Editor: Jeffrey Cooper
- Running time: 97 minutes
- Production company: Tri-Ess Productions

Original release
- Network: Showtime
- Release: November 12, 2000

Seventeen Again is an American fantasy–comedy film. It first aired on Showtime on November 12, 2000, and was released on DVD on April 9, 2002. The film was also included as a bonus feature on the Sister, Sister (which ended in May 1999) Complete Collection box set released in March 2016. Directed by Jeffrey W. Byrd, it stars Tia Mowry & Tamera Mowry, and their younger brother Tahj Mowry.

== Plot ==
When the Donovan family moves from California to Connecticut, 17-year-old Sydney (Tia Mowry) finds it is not easy being in a new town away from her old friends and adjusting to her father's remarriage after her mother died some time ago. However, while working at her new job, she encounters Todd (Merwin Mondesir), a boy in her class, whom she has a crush on. However, Ashley (Maia Campbell), his older sister, dislikes her and criticizes her any way she can. Her 12-year-old genius brother Willie (Tahj Mowry) is happy as long as he can tinker in his lab with his increasingly complex experiments. When another experiment goes wrong, their father, Barry (Phillip Jarrett), forbids him from making more experiments in his lab until he learns responsibility. Willie is convinced he can defeat the aging process, and while devising an experimental anti-aging formula, he accidentally spills some on a box of soap.

When their grandmother Cat (Hope Clarke) unknowingly uses the tainted soap, she is transformed into a 17-year-old (Tamera Mowry). Her ex-husband Gene (Robert Hooks) follows suit, and is also returned to his teenaged self (Mark Taylor).

Cat and Gene are having a fine time reliving their youth and enjoying the thrill of teenage romance. However, Willie learns about the soap containing his formula's deadly side effects, and now he must find an antidote to return his grandparents to their older but healthy bodies. Through their experience as teenagers again, Gene and Cat realize they are still in love with each other but Cat is reluctant to believe Gene's feelings are genuine as she is still heartbroken that he chose to leave her for a job in Australia 20 years ago, hence the reason for their divorce.

In Sydney's room, she and Cat finally have a long and heartfelt talk. Sydney admits she's homesick for California and her old friends. She hates Connecticut and Ashley's bullying at school. During that time, Cat admits her earlier experience with Ashley. However unlike Sydney, she was able to stand up to Ashley and earn her begrudging respect. Meanwhile, Gene who has had time to reflect on his life choices, realizes his mistake of leaving his family, and bids farewell to his life as a teenager and the friends he has made, and goes to the dance with Ashley in hopes of reconciling with Cat.

Meanwhile, at the dance, Sydney and Cat arrive and find Gene with Ashley. Gene and Cat share a dance where they reconcile, before Cat passes out due to the side effects of the transformation. Willie arrives with the antidote as Gene carries Cat to the school's swimming pool. Ashley, furious that Gene ditched her for Cat, cuts them off before they can save her. Having had enough of Ashley's arrogance, Sydney punches her in the face. Afterwards, Willie tosses the antidote in the pool and Gene and Cat jump in. The next day, Sydney and Willie's dad, Barry and step-mother, Monique (Tonya Lee Williams) come home from a trip. The parents are surprised to see Cat and Gene reconciled. Gene asks Cat to marry him again after their crazy experience and Cat happily accepts. Monique accepts Sydney's help in planning Gene and Cat's wedding. Barry goes to take a shower, but Sydney and Willie quickly stop their dad from using that soap before it's too late.

== Cast ==
- Tia Mowry as Sydney Donovan
- Tahj Mowry as Willie Donovan, Sydney's younger brother
- Hope Clarke as Grandma Catherine "Cat" Donovan, Sydney & Willie's paternal grandmother
  - Tamera Mowry as Young Cat Donovan
- Robert Hooks as Grandpa Eugene "Gene" Donovan, Sydney & Willie's paternal grandfather
  - Mark Taylor as Young Gene Donovan
- Merwin Mondesir as Todd, a boy who Sydney has a crush on.
- Phillip Jarrett as Barry Donovan, Sydney & Willie's father
- Tonya Lee Williams as Monique Donovan, Barry's second wife and Sydney & Willie's stepmother
- Maia Campbell as Ashley, Todd's older sister
- Daryn Jones as Terrance
- Novie Edwards as Julie, Sydney's friend and co-worker.

== Production notes ==
Seventeen Again was executive produced by Boyz II Men member Shawn Stockman. Stockman also served as the film's music composer.

Seventeen Again was filmed on location in Toronto, Ontario, Canada. The school scenes were filmed at Eastern High School.

The film went on to find greater popularity throughout the early-mid 2000s from frequent airings on Disney Channel.

== Awards and nominations ==
Year	Award	Result	Category	Recipient
2000	American Black Film Festival	Won	Best Work in Progress	Jeffrey W. Byrd
2001	Young Artist Award	Nominated	Best Family TV Movie/Pilot/Mini-Series - Cable	-
2001	Young Artist Award	Nominated	Best Performance in a TV Movie (Comedy) - Leading Young Actress	Tia and Tamera Mowry
2001	Young Artist Award	Nominated	Best Performance in a TV Movie (Comedy) - Supporting Young Actor	Tahj Mowry

== Reception ==
Seventeen Again has a 6.3/10 rating on the Internet Movie Database.
