= Tiko Campbell =

American architect

- Born: Tiko Frederick Campbell; August 7, 1947; Washington, D.C., U.S.
- Died: February 16, 2012 (aged 64)
- Occupations: Author; Architect
- Spouse: Bebe Moore (m. 1970; div. 1979)
- Children: 2; including Maia Campbell

Tiko Frederick Campbell (August 7, 1947 – February 16, 2012) was an American author and architect from the Washington, D.C. area. He was also the author of an adventure/sci-fi novel named The Light in the Stones: ...from the tales of Fibinacci...

== Personal life ==
Campbell was the ex-husband of the late author Bebe Moore Campbell, and father of actress Maia Campbell.
