= Freud's Last Session =

Film by Matt Brown

- US release poster
- Directed by: Matthew Brown
- Screenplay by: Mark St. Germain; Matthew Brown
- Based on: Freud's Last Session by Mark St. Germain
- Produced by: Alan Greisman; Rick Nicita; Meg Thomson; Hannah Leader; Tristan Orpen Lynch; Robert Stillman; Matthew Brown
- Starring: Anthony Hopkins; Matthew Goode; Liv Lisa Fries; Jodi Balfour; Jeremy Northam; Orla Brady
- Cinematography: Ben Smithard
- Edited by: Paul Tothill
- Music by: Coby Brown
- Production companies: Fís Éireann / Screen Ireland; Last Session Productions; Subotica Productions; 14 Sunset
- Distributed by: Sony Pictures Classics (Select territories); Vertigo Releasing (United Kingdom and Ireland)
- Release dates: 27 October 2023 (AFI); 22 December 2023 (United States); 14 June 2024 (United Kingdom)
- Running time: 109 minutes
- Countries: United States; United Kingdom
- Language: English
- Box office: $4.2 million

Freud's Last Session is a 2023 drama film starring Anthony Hopkins, Matthew Goode, Liv Lisa Fries, Jodi Balfour, Jeremy Northam, and Orla Brady. It is based on the stage play of the same name by Mark St. Germain, which itself is based upon the book The Question of God, by Armand Nicholi. The film was directed by Matthew Brown and written by St. Germain.

Freud's Last Session premiered at the 2023 AFI Fest on October 27, 2023. Sony Pictures Classics released the film in a limited release in the United States on 22 December 2023, before expanding wide on 19 January 2024 to mixed reviews from critics.

== Plot ==
A fictional meeting occurs between C. S. Lewis, nicknamed "Jack", and Sigmund Freud, two days after the start of World War II. They debate the existence of God, as Freud greatly resents Lewis's recent rejection of his own strain of atheism in favour of Christianity, and many other subjects. The two men discuss issues such as Lewis's post-traumatic stress disorder as a World War I combat veteran, J. R. R. Tolkien and the Inklings, and the nature of Freud's and Lewis's relationships with other people, such as Freud's daughter Anna, who is codependent upon her father. However, she eventually introduces her lesbian lover, Dorothy Burlingham, to him.

At its close, the film records that Freud died by suicide several weeks later due to the intense pain from his oral cancer; Lewis became a famous author of Christian literature, and the children he took in as evacuees during the war inspired The Chronicles of Narnia; Anna and Dorothy lived together for decades, and Anna became known as the founder of child psychology. The film notes that Freud met with an unidentified Oxford don in the last days of his life, who could possibly have been Lewis.

== Cast ==
- Anthony Hopkins as Sigmund Freud
- Matthew Goode as C. S. Lewis
- Liv Lisa Fries as Anna Freud
- Jodi Balfour as Dorothy Burlingham
- Jeremy Northam as Ernest Jones
- Orla Brady as Janie Moore
- David Shields as Weldon

== Production ==
WestEnd Films and CAA Media Finance took the project for sales to the Cannes Film Festival in May 2022 with Anthony Hopkins cast, and Matthew Brown on board as director for the St. Germain adaptation. The film is produced by Alan Greisman, Rick Nicita, Meg Thomson and Hannah Leader, with production beginning in the U.K. in late January 2023. However, for financial reasons Freud’s Hampstead house and famous psychoanalyst couch were recreated in Dublin at the Ardmore Studios. A selection of props from the film (particularly the replica couch and garden tent chair) have since May 2023 been housed at the Freud Museum London. Co-produced by Aoife O’Sullivan and Tristan Orpen Lynch of Subotica Operations, the film received UK Global Screen Fund International Co-production funding. An image from principal photography was released in April 2023 with the film entering the final stages of filming in Ireland.

== Release ==
Freud's Last Session premiered at the 2023 AFI Fest on October 27, 2023. That same month, Sony Pictures Classics purchased the distribution rights for North America, the Middle East, India, Eastern Europe (excluding the CIS), and Turkey, as well as airlines worldwide; the company would subsequently extend its rights to Latin America and Asia excluding China, Japan and Korea. It had a limited release in the United States on 22 December 2023 and in United Kingdom on 14 June 2024.

== Reception ==
=== Box office ===
Freud's Last Session grossed $906,283 in the United States and Canada and $3.3 million in other countries, for a worldwide total of $4.2 million.

=== Critical response ===
On the review aggregator website Rotten Tomatoes, 44% of 122 critics' reviews are positive, with an average rating of 5.7/10. The website's consensus reads: "Anthony Hopkins and Matthew Goode are a tremendously talented pair, but Freud's Last Session is too scattered and thinly written to take full advantage of their efforts." Metacritic, which uses a weighted average, assigned the film a score of 48 out of 100, based on 18 critics, indicating "mixed or average" reviews.
