= Blood Hunters =

- Directed by: Tricia Lee
- Written by: Corey Brown
- Produced by: Tricia Lee; Chris Luckhardt
- Starring: Lara Gilchrist; Torri Higginson; Mark Taylor
- Cinematography: Ryan Knight
- Edited by: Jane MacRae
- Music by: Aaron Gilhuis
- Production company: Film Monkey
- Release date: August 29, 2016 (London FrightFest)
- Running time: 90 minutes
- Country: Canada
- Language: English

Blood Hunters (formerly titled One Drop) is a 2016 Canadian horror thriller film directed by Tricia Lee and starring Lara Gilchrist, Torri Higginson and Mark Taylor.

== Cast ==
- Lara Gilchrist as Ellie
- Benjamin Arthur as Henry
- Torri Higginson as Marion
- Mark Taylor as George
- Julian Richings as Father Stewart
- Peter Blankenstein

== Release ==
The film premiered at the London FrightFest Film Festival on August 29, 2016. Then it was released on DVD, VOD and digital platforms in Canada and the United States on July 4, 2017.

== Reception ==
The film has a 40% approval rating on Rotten Tomatoes based on 10 reviews, with an average rating of 5.3/10. Gareth Jones of Dread Central awarded the film three stars out of five. Barry Hertz of The Globe and Mail awarded the film two stars out of four.

Chris Knight of the National Post gave the film a negative review and wrote, "The actors do their best to invest Corey Brown’s headlong script with sympathy and a little gravitas, but sometimes it’s all they can do to draw breath."
