= Merwin Mondesir =

Canadian actor

Merwin Mondeser
- Born: February 21, 1976 (age 50); Toronto, Ontario, Canada
- Occupation: Actor
- Years active: 1996–present

Merwin Mondesir (born February 21, 1976) is a Canadian actor. He is of Saint Lucian descent. He resides in Toronto, Ontario, Canada.

== Selected filmography ==
=== Film ===
Year	Title	Role	Notes	Ref.
1997	Critical Care	Head Injury		
2000	Steal This Movie!	Private Kendall		
2000	Seventeen Again	Todd		
2001	Bones	Bill Peet		
2003	The Recruit	Stan		
2004	Against the Ropes	Street Crony		
2004	Godsend	Maurice		
2004	Noel	Glenn		
2007	How She Move	Niko Niles		
2008	Lost Boys: The Tribe	Erik		
2010	Smokin' Aces 2: Assassins' Ball	FBI Agent Osterberg		
2011	Grave Encounters	T.C. Gibson		
2012	Cold Blooded	Nestor Grimes		
2014	The Big Fat Stone	Mugger		
2016	It Stains the Sands Red	Nick		
2019	Code 8	Jules		

=== Television ===
Year	Title	Role	Notes	Ref.
1996–1998	Straight Up	Dennis		
1997–2000	Riverdale	Gordon Johnson		
2000	Drop the Beat	Dennis "Ballistic"		
2001–2002	The Ripping Friends	"Slab" (voice)	13 episodes	
2005	Plague City: SARS in Toronto	Rob Connell	TV movie	
2006	Noah's Arc	"Dre"	7 episodes	
2012	Rookie Blue	Roland Jones	1 episode	
2014	Defiance	Mahsuvus Gorath	2 episodes	
2017	In Contempt	Loftin Dubar	1 episode	
