= Drop the Beat =

- Genre: Drama
- Written by: Noel S. Baker; Vance Chapman
- Directed by: Paul Fox; Daniel Grou
- Starring: Mark Taylor; Merwin Mondesir; Ingrid Veninger; Michie Mee
- Country of origin: Canada
- Original language: English
- No. of seasons: 2
- No. of episodes: 26

Production
- Executive producers: Janis Lundman; Adrienne Mitchell; Suzanne Chapman
- Producer: Susan Alexander
- Cinematography: Jérôme Sabourin
- Running time: 30 minutes
- Production company: Back Alley Film Productions

Original release
- Network: CBC Television
- Release: February 7, 2000 – April 9, 2001

Drop the Beat is a Canadian television series produced by Back Alley Film Productions that aired on CBC Television in 2000 and 2001. A short-run dramatic series, the show was one of the first television series in the world centred around hip hop music and culture.

A spinoff of the earlier CBC teen drama series Straight Up, the show starred Mark Taylor as Jeff and Merwin Mondesir as Dennis, the hosts of a hip hop show on CIBJ-FM, a fictional campus radio station in Toronto, Ontario. Michie Mee also starred as Divine, a rapper who was part of Jeff and Dennis' crew, and Ingrid Veninger played the station manager. The supporting cast also included Arlene Duncan, Vanessa Ford, Jennifer Baxter, Jason Harrow, Shamann Williams and Omari Forrester.

The use of a campus radio station was a deliberate reflection of Canadian reality — until Toronto's Flow 93.5 hit the airwaves in early 2001, Canada did not have any radio stations dedicated specifically to urban music.

== Production ==
As a tie-in to help promote emerging hip hop musicians, the series released a soundtrack album in conjunction with the first season, featuring artists such as Maestro Fresh Wes, Infinite, Frankie Ano, Bahamadia, Ja Rule, Black Child, Choclair, Rahzel, Jully Black and Erykah Badu.

The show was also released as one of the first "interactive" dramatic television series on WebTV. Viewers on that platform could call up character biographies, post messages on an interactive user forum, or buy the soundtrack album through embedded sales links.

Episode directors included John Greyson, Paul Fox, Daniel Grou, Eleanore Lindo, T. W. Peacocke, Frances-Anne Solomon and Sudz Sutherland.

== Awards ==
The series received two Gemini Award nominations for Best Dramatic Series, at the 15th Gemini Awards in 2000 and at the 16th Gemini Awards in 2001. Sutherland received a nomination for Best Writing in a Drama Series in 2000 for the episode "Battle Royale", and Taylor received a nomination for Best Actor in a Drama Series in 2001.

== Episodes ==
=== Season 1 ===
No.	Title	Directed by	Written by	Original release date
1	"Public Nuisance"	Unknown	Unknown	February 7, 2000
2	"Life Sentence"	Unknown	Unknown	February 14, 2000
3	"Battle Royale"	Unknown	Sudz Sutherland	February 21, 2000
4	"Superstar"	Unknown	Unknown	February 28, 2000
5	"Image Is Nothing"	Unknown	Unknown	March 13, 2000
6	"Rapped Out"	Unknown	Unknown	March 20, 2000
7	"Caught"	Unknown	Unknown	March 27, 2000
8	"1 Night Stand"	Unknown	Unknown	April 3, 2000

=== Season 2 ===
No.	Title	Directed by	Written by	Original release date
1	"Roti Boy"	Unknown	Unknown	October 2, 2000
2	"Belly"	Unknown	Unknown	October 9, 2000
3	"Palya Position"	Unknown	Unknown	October 16, 2000
4	"Payback"	Unknown	Unknown	October 23, 2000
5	"Break 'n Enter"	Unknown	Unknown	November 6, 2000
6	"Deja You"	Unknown	Unknown	November 13, 2000
7	"Girlz Night Out"	Unknown	Unknown	November 20, 2000
8	"Fallen Hero"	Unknown	Unknown	December 4, 2000
9	"Trigger Man"	Unknown	Unknown	February 5, 2001
10	"Connections"	Unknown	Unknown	February 12, 2001
11	"Shaka"	Unknown	Unknown	February 19, 2001
12	"Katalyst"	Unknown	Unknown	February 26, 2001
13	"One of the Boys"	Unknown	Unknown	March 5, 2001
14	"Trippin"	Unknown	Unknown	March 12, 2001
15	"Doing Good With Evil"	Unknown	Unknown	March 19, 2001
16	"Sabotage"	Unknown	Unknown	March 26, 2001
17	"Rage"	Unknown	Unknown	April 2, 2001
18	"Choices"	Unknown	Unknown	April 9, 2001

== Soundtrack album ==
1. Saukrates, "Drop the Beat" (4:06)
2. Kardinal Offishall, "Husslin'" (3:43)
3. Ja Rule, Black Child and Caddillac Tah, "4 Life" (4:24)
4. Rahzel, Jully Black and Choclair, "What You Do to Me" (4:19)
5. Erykah Badu and Rahzel, "Southern Gul" (3:07)
6. Marvel, "Red Light District" (3:57)
7. Infinite, "Addicted" (3:36)
8. Common, "Dooinit" (4:12)
9. Rascalz, "C-IV" (3:18)
10. Bahamadia and Frankie Ano, "Droppin' Gems" (4:14)
11. Mathematik feat. Dub-Ill, "Illmath (Weapons)" (3:19)
12. Canibus, "100 Bars" (4:58)
13. Kardinal Offishall and Thrust, "The Chosen Are Few" (3:22)
14. Maestro and Infinite, "We Came Wid It" (3:24)
15. Ivana Santilli and Natcha, "New World" (4:21)
16. Lil' Troy feat. Fat Pat, Yungstar, Lil' Wil, Big T and H.A.W.K., "Wanna Be a Baller" (5:55)
