= Jodi Balfour =

South African actress (born 29 October 1987)

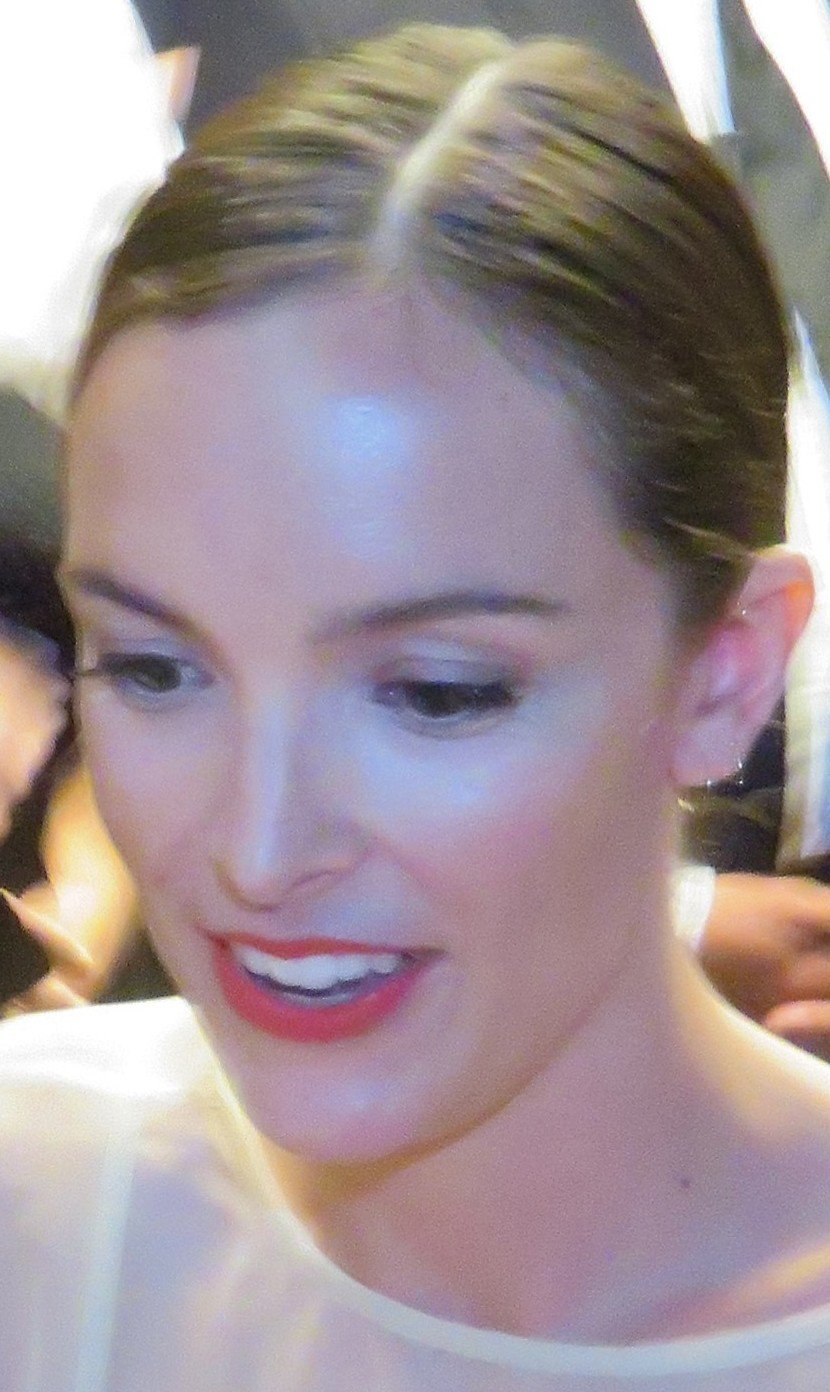
- Balfour in 2019
- Born: October 29, 1987 (age 39); Cape Town, South Africa
- Education: University of Cape Town
- Occupations: Film and television actress
- Years active: 2009–present
- Known for: Bomb Girls; Rellik; For All Mankind; Ted Lasso
- Spouse: Abbi Jacobson (m. 2023)

Jodi Balfour is a South African actress (born 29 October 1987). She won a Canadian Screen Award for her performance as Gladys Witham in the series Bomb Girls (2012–2013). She has since starred as Ellen Waverly Wilson in the Apple TV+ series For All Mankind (2019–2023).

== Early life and education ==
Jodi Balfour grew up in Cape Town, South Africa.

She studied drama at the University of Cape Town, graduating in 2009.

== Career ==
Balfour moved to Canada for work, taking roles in Sanctuary and Supernatural.

She was cast as Gladys Witham in the Canadian television drama series Bomb Girls in 2013. She won a Canadian Screen Award for Best Lead Actress in a Television Film or Miniseries at the 3rd Canadian Screen Awards in 2015 for her performance in the series' follow-up television film Bomb Girls: Facing the Enemy.

In February 2015, Balfour was cast in the Cinemax series Quarry. In 2017, she portrayed Jacqueline Kennedy in episode eight of The Crown's second season, with Michael C. Hall playing her husband President Kennedy.

From 2019 to 2023, she starred in the Apple TV+ space drama series For All Mankind. In April 2022, she was cast in the Apple TV+ football sitcom Ted Lasso.

In the 2023 film Freud's Last Session, she portrayed the American psychoanalyst Dorothy Burlingham, the colleague and companion of Anna Freud.

== Personal life ==
Balfour was based in Vancouver, British Columbia, Canada. As of 2021 she was co-owner of Nelson the Seagull, a coffeehouse and bake shop in the city's Gastown neighbourhood.

On 30 June 2021, she announced on Instagram that she identifies as queer, stating that she found it freeing to "finally embrace and explore my queerness." On 24 October 2021, Balfour announced on Instagram that she and Abbi Jacobson had been romantically involved for a year. They married in Brooklyn, New York, in 2023.

== Filmography ==
=== Film ===
Year	Title	Role	Notes
2011	Vampire	Michaela	
2011	Final Destination 5	Woman	
2013	A Ghost Within	Hanna / Abby	Short
2013	The Husband	Claire	
2013	Afterparty	Karen	Also producer
2013	Waterloo	Molly Mckenzie	Short
2014	Valentines Day	Molly	Short
2015	Unearthing	Fisher Hart	
2015	Eadweard	Mary	
2015	Almost Anything	Beans	Also executive producer
2019	The Rest of Us	Rachel	
2023	Freud's Last Session	Dorothy Burlingham	

=== Television ===
Year	Title	Role	Notes
2009	The Philanthropist	Concierge	Episode: "San Diego"
2010	Congo	Johanna Wenz	TV film
2010	Tower Prep	Emily Wright	2 episodes
2011	The Sinking of the Laconia	Sarah Fullwood	TV miniseries
2011	R. L. Stine's The Haunting Hour: The Series	Priscilla	Episode: "Nightmare Inn"
2011	Supernatural	Melissa	Episode: "Like a Virgin"
2011	V	V Greeter	Episode: "Uneasy Lies the Head"
2011	Sanctuary	Terry	Episode: "Icebreaker"
2012–2013	Primeval: New World	Samantha Sedaris	3 episodes
2012–2013	Bomb Girls	Gladys Witham	Main role
2014	The Best Laid Plans	Lindsay Dewar	TV miniseries
2014	Bomb Girls: Facing the Enemy	Gladys Witham	TV film
2016	Quarry	Joni Conway	Main role
2017	Rellik	DI Elaine Shepard	Main role
2017	The Crown	Jackie Kennedy	Episode: "Dear Mrs. Kennedy"
2019	True Detective	Lori	3 episodes
2019–2023	For All Mankind	Ellen Waverly / Wilson	Main role (seasons 1–3), guest (season 4)
2023	Ted Lasso	Jack Danvers	4 episodes

=== Theatre ===
Year	Title	Role	Venue	Notes
2025	Lowcountry	Tally	Atlantic Theater Company	

== Awards and nominations ==
Year	Association	Category	Nominated work	Result
2013	Leo Awards	Best Lead Performance by a Female in a Dramatic Series	Bomb Girls	Nominated
2014	Canadian Filmmakers' Festival	Best Ensemble (shared with Graham Coffeng, Ali Liebert, Nicholas Carella, Peter Benson, David Milchard, Erica Carroll, Christina Sicoli, and Emma Lahana)	Afterparty	Won
2015	Canadian Screen Awards	Best Performance by an Actress in a Leading Role in a Dramatic Program or Mini-Series	Bomb Girls: Facing the Enemy	Won
