= Charlotte Hegele =

Canadian actress

- Born: November 12, 1990 (age 35); Toronto, Ontario, Canada
- Occupation: Actress
- Years active: 2010–present

Charlotte Hegele is a Canadian actress best known for her role as Kate Andrews on the Canadian television drama series Bomb Girls.

== Life and career ==
Charlotte Hegele is an Ontarian who was born in Toronto and spent most of her childhood in London, Ontario. Hegele began acting in community theatre and decided to return to Toronto in 2008 to attend Humber College's Acting for Film and Television Diploma Program. After graduation, she began working on several projects filmed in Toronto, such as Murdoch Mysteries and a recurring role on the television show Guidance, before acquiring her lead role on the World War II period drama Bomb Girls, and its subsequent film Bomb Girls: Facing the Enemy.

Since 2014, Hegele had a recurring role as Julie Thatcher on the American-Canadian television drama series When Calls the Heart. She has not appeared on the show since 2023.

Her father, Robert Hegele, is an endocrinologist and scientist at the University of Western Ontario.

== Filmography ==
Film and television
Year	Title	Role	Notes
2010	Sundays at Tiffany's	Hostess	TV film
2011	XIII: The Series	Assistant	Episode: "Green Falls"
2011	Murdoch Mysteries	Annabelle Rose	Episode: "The Kissing Bandit"
2012–2013	Bomb Girls	Kate Andrews	Main role
2013	Haven	Katie	Episode: "The New Girl"
2013	Off2Kali Comedy	Melissa	Episode: "Santa GameKiller"
2013	Guidance	Beth	Episodes: "The Tutor", "Sex Workshop", "Drugs Drugs Drugs", "Guidance Dance"
2014	Bomb Girls: Facing the Enemy	Kate Andrews	TV film
2014	Republic of Doyle	Lydia Cantor	Episode: "Smash Derby"
2014	Reign	Jenny	Episode: "Three Queens"
2014–2019, 2023	When Calls the Heart	Julie Thatcher	Recurring role
2019	A Very Country Wedding	Cake	TV film
2019	Hudson & Rex	Abby Cleese	Episodes: "Fast Eddie's"
