= Straight Up (TV series) =

- Created by: Eric Norlen, Adrienne Mitchell, Janis Lundman, Christine Shipton
- Starring: ensemble cast
- Country of origin: Canada
- No. of episodes: 13

Production
- Running time: 60 min.
- Production companies: Alliance Communications; Back Alley Film Productions

Original release
- Network: CBC
- Release: 1996 – 1998

Straight Up is a Canadian television series produced by Back Alley Film Productions. Although critically acclaimed, the show only ran for 13 episodes on CBC Television from 1996 to 1998. Set in Toronto, the show dealt with the gritty problems of teenagers living in an urban environment.

Rather than focusing on a core group of principal characters, each episode would typically feature a different set of the ensemble teenage cast. Initially, although the character relationships were intertwined, each episode would feature a self-contained plot usually involving only a few of the characters. However, during the second season, there was a continuing story arc involving a murder over multiple episodes.

The series spawned the spin-off series Drop the Beat, which followed the characters of Jeff and Dennis as DJs at a campus radio station.

== Cast ==
- Tomas Chovanec as Tony
- Evelyn Anders as Claire
- Mona Atwell as Simone
- Morpheus Blak as Vanya
- Robin Brûlé as Marcia
- Marc Cohen as Murray
- Nicole Crozier as Louise
- Sasha Dindayal as Charlene
- Chad Donella as Rick
- Dyson Forbes as Dyson
- Omari Forrester as Pipe
- Tamara Gorski as Corey
- Suzanne Hatim as Sondra
- Erin Hicock as Jaz
- Kirk Lewis as Clay
- Noam T.C.S. Lior as Ed
- Shawn Mathieson as Steve
- Merwin Mondesir as Dennis
- Justin Peroff as Rory
- Sarah Polley as Lily
- Mark Taylor as Jeff
- Jacob Tierney as Alex

== Episodes ==
=== Season 1: 1996 ===
No. overall	No. in season	Title	Directed by	Written by	Original release date
1	1	"Jam"	TBD	TBD	1996
2	2	"Dead Babies"	TBD	TBD	1996
3	3	"Big Time"	TBD	TBD	1996
4	4	"Small Bang Theory"	TBD	TBD	1996
5	5	"Sacrifice Trick"	TBD	TBD	1996
6	6	"Seize"	TBD	TBD	1996

=== Season 2: 1998 ===
No. overall	No. in season	Title	Directed by	Written by	Original release date
7	1	"Strapped"	TBD	TBD	1998
8	2	"Raw"	TBD	TBD	1998
9	3	"Mortifying"	TBD	TBD	1998
10	4	"Façade"	TBD	TBD	1998
11	5	"Gravity"	Adrienne Mitchell	Karen Walton	1998
12	6	"Pudding"	TBD	TBD	1998
13	7	"Bomb"	TBD	TBD	1998

== Awards and nominations ==
At the 1997 Gemini Awards, Jerry Ciccoritti won for "Best Direction in a Dramatic or Comedy Series" for the episode "Small Bang Theory" and James Bredin was nominated for "Best Picture Editing in a Dramatic Program or Series" for same episode.

At the 1998 Gemini Awards, Sarah Polley won for "Best Performance in a Children's or Youth Program or Series" for the episode "Mortifying" and Jerry Ciccoritti won for "Best Direction in a Dramatic or Comedy Series" again this time for the episode "Raw" . Also at these awards, Merwin Mondesir was nominated for "Best Performance in a Children's or Youth Program or Series" for the episode "Façade", Karen Walton was nominated for "Best Writing in a Children's or Youth Program and Series" for the episode "Gravity". The episode "Raw" was also nominated for "Best Sound in a Dramatic Program or Series" and "Best Costume Design". Finally, Straight Up was nominated for "Best Children's or Youth Program or Series".
