= Robert Hegele =

- Born: Toronto, Ontario, Canada
- Education: University of Toronto (MD)
- Occupations: Clinician-scientist, endocrinologist, professor
- Known for: Genetic discoveries in lipid disorders; development of DNA tests for familial hypercholesterolemia; translation of genomics into clinical care
- Awards: Fellow of the Royal Society of Canada; Canadian Medical Hall of Fame

Robert A. Hegele is a Canadian clinician-scientist and endocrinologist. He is Distinguished University Professor in the Departments of Medicine and Biochemistry at Western University, where he also holds the Jacob J. Wolfe Distinguished Medical Research Chair in Human Gene Function and directs the London Regional Genomics Centre. He is internationally recognized for his work in identifying the genetic basis of inherited lipid disorders and translating those discoveries into clinical care, including the development of diagnostic DNA testing and the early adoption of novel cholesterol-lowering therapies.

== Early life and education ==
Hegele was born in Toronto, Ontario, to immigrant parents who emphasized education. He initially trained in classical piano at Toronto's Royal Conservatory of Music before pursuing a career in medicine. He earned his MD from the University of Toronto in 1981, followed by postgraduate training in internal medicine and endocrinology. He completed four years of postdoctoral training at Rockefeller University and the Howard Hughes Medical Institute, specializing in cholesterol metabolism and human genetics.

== Career ==
Hegele began his academic career at the University of Toronto and St. Michael's Hospital before moving to Western University in 1997. At Western's Schulich School of Medicine & Dentistry, he was appointed Distinguished University Professor and also leads a lipid clinic at London Health Sciences Centre's University Hospital. He is the founding director of the London Regional Genomics Centre at Robarts Research Institute and holds both the Jacob J. Wolfe Distinguished Medical Research Chair in Human Gene Function and the Martha G. Blackburn Chair in Cardiovascular Research.

Hegele's Lipid Genetics Clinic serves over 2,400 patients and has been a central site for pioneering clinical care and research in inherited metabolic disorders. He remains clinically active, often emphasizing that patient interaction continues to inform and drive his research.

== Research contributions ==
Hegele is internationally recognized for his work in the genetics of lipid metabolism. His laboratory has identified the genetic basis for over twenty inherited disorders, including familial hypercholesterolemia, familial partial lipodystrophy, hepatic lipase deficiency, and a novel type 2 diabetes variant among the Oji-Cree population.

He developed diagnostic DNA tests for familial lipid disorders that are now used widely in Canada and internationally. These tests, funded by Ontario's public health system, allow for early diagnosis and targeted treatment, especially in high-risk families.

Hegele also led early clinical trials for multiple novel cholesterol- and diabetes-lowering drugs, including rosuvastatin, sitagliptin, evolocumab, inclisiran, and evinacumab. Several of these treatments became standard therapies following successful testing in his clinic. He has authored more than 1,000 peer-reviewed papers, and his work has been cited over 100,000 times.

In addition to laboratory work, Hegele has contributed to national clinical practice guidelines on cholesterol, blood pressure, and diabetes, and has participated in the development of international consensus documents on familial hypercholesterolemia and hypertriglyceridemia.

== Awards and honors ==
Hegele has received numerous honors throughout his career:

- Elected Fellow of the Royal Society of Canada (2025), for pioneering research in the genetics of lipid disorders and its clinical applications.
- Inducted into the Canadian Medical Hall of Fame (2026), for his transformative work on inherited lipid disorders.
- Recipient of the FH Foundation’s Pioneer Award (2020), the first Canadian to be recognized for contributions to familial hypercholesterolemia research and care.
- W. Virgil Brown Distinguished Achievement Award from the National Lipid Association (2024), for lifetime achievement in lipidology.
- George Lyman Duff Memorial Lecture Award from the American Heart Association (2019), for contributions to atherosclerosis research.

He is also a Fellow of the Canadian Academy of Health Sciences and the American Heart Association.

== Personal life ==
Hegele has cited family experiences with heart disease as an early motivator for his research. His daughter, Charlotte Hegele, is a Canadian television and stage actress.
