= Jeffery Wood =

American actor (born 1986)

- Born: December 22, 1986 (age 39); San Diego, California, U.S.
- Occupation: Actor
- Years active: 1991–present

Jeffery Wood (born December 22, 1986) is an American actor. He is best known for his role as Austin Warren during the first two seasons of the 1990s sitcom, In the House, and Jimmy Harrison on Sunset Beach.

In 2017, Wood starred alongside Nathan Fillion as the 'Warlock' in the live-action trailer for the Bungie and Activision video game, Destiny 2.

== Acting career ==
Wood made his on-screen debut in commercials and guest starring television roles. In 1994, he landed a role in the Tony award winning Vivian Beaumont Theater revival of Carousel. After a year with the production, he landed his first major television role as Austin Warren in the then-NBC sitcom In the House. He has also made appearances on several series, including New York Undercover, The Parent 'Hood, Strong Medicine and had a contract role as Jimmy Harrison on NBC's soap opera Sunset Beach from 1997–1999.

== Filmography ==
=== Film ===
Year	Title	Role	Notes
1997	Little Cobras: Operation Dalmatian	Timothy	
1998	Young Hearts Unlimited	Tyler	TV movie
2014	Like She Can	Wade Tyler	Short film
2015	Arguments	Alan	Short film
2015	Losing Focus	Chris	Short film
2016	Over 21	Jason Powell	Short film
2016	Your Turn	Dante	Short film
2017	Destiny 2 New Legends Will Rise Live Action Trailer	Warlock	Trailer/National Commercial

=== Television ===
Year	Title	Role	Notes
1995	New York Undercover	Elmore	Episode: "CAT"
1995	The Wright Verdicts		
1995–1996	In the House	Austin Warren	Seasons 1–2
1996	Public Morals	Robert	Episode: "The Aqua Cover"
1997	The Parent 'Hood	Hakeem	2 episodes
1998	Fame L.A.	Kid	Episode: "Duet"
1998–1999	Sunset Beach	Jimmy Harrison	50 episodes
1999	Promised Land	David Phillips	Episode: "What's in a Word"
1999	Grown Ups	Young J. Calvin Frazier	Episode: "Why Can't We Not Be Friends"
2000	Arli$$		Episode: "It's Who You Know"
2000	Strong Medicine	Bug	Episode: "Second Look"
2006	Just for Kicks	Ryan	Episode: "The Freudian Kick"
2013	Life After	Himself	Episode: "Maia Campbell: In the House"

== Theater ==
Year	Show	Role	Notes
1994	Carousel	Snow Child	Vivian Beaumont Theater; February 18, 1994 – January 15, 1995

== Music career ==
In his early to mid teens, Wood made a transition into hip hop under the name J-Dub. After the release of his popular 2012 mixtape The Captain, he released his final album, Insomnia, in 2013.

== Business ventures ==
In 2011, Wood created and ran RapRise.com, a blog site for unsigned hip hop.

In 2013, Wood created the film production company Puzzle Man.
