= Bomb Girls =

Canadian television drama

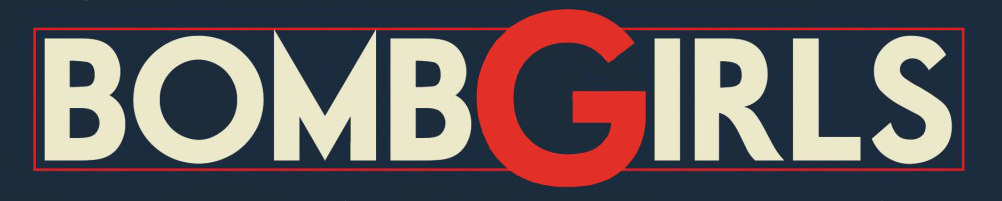
- Genre: Drama
- Created by: Michael MacLennan; Adrienne Mitchell
- Written by: Michael MacLennan
- Directed by: Ken Girotti; Adrienne Mitchell; Anne Wheeler
- Starring: Meg Tilly; Jodi Balfour; Charlotte Hegele; Ali Liebert
- Country of origin: Canada
- Original language: English
- No. of seasons: 2
- No. of episodes: 19

Production
- Executive producers: Janis Lundman; Michael MacLennan; Adrienne Mitchell; Michael Prupas
- Producer: Wendy Grean
- Production locations: Toronto, Ontario, Canada
- Cinematography: Éric Cayla
- Editors: Teresa De Luca; Tad Seaborn
- Camera setup: Multi-camera
- Running time: 45 minutes
- Production companies: Muse Entertainment; Back Alley Films

Original release
- Network: Global; Univision Canada
- Release: January 4, 2012 – April 29, 2013

Bomb Girls is a Canadian television drama that debuted on January 4, 2012, on Global and Univision Canada in Spanish. The plot profiles the stories of four women working in a Canadian munitions factory during World War II, beginning in 1941. Originally intended to be a six-part drama miniseries, two seasons have aired. The show began airing in the United States on ReelzChannel on September 11, 2012, in the United Kingdom on ITV3 on November 10, 2012, in Ireland on TG4 on 6 January 2013, and in Poland on Fokus TV on 10 June 2014.

== Characters ==
=== Main ===
- Lorna Corbett (Meg Tilly) – The Victory Munitions' Blue Shift floor matron. Lorna's relationship with her husband is strained. Her daughter works as a nurse's aide and her two sons are fighting in the war. Lorna tries to keep reins on the girls who work under her and often advocates for their best interests, being very moral and traditional. She has an affair with Marco after originally trying to get him fired, with the affair resulting in a pregnancy. Lorna later miscarries after her husband finds out about the affair.
- Gladys Witham (Jodi Balfour) – The only daughter of a wealthy Rosedale family, she originally began working in the office during Blue Shift but had her position changed so she could work on the floor. She has a one-night affair (petting and kissing only) with a soldier, Lewis, and accepts his marriage proposal out of guilt, despite already being engaged; she later discovers that her fiancé has been having an affair. She speaks her mind and works hard to be accepted by the other floor workers. Eventually, her fiancé enlists and is killed overseas. Gladys struggles with her future and not knowing her role.
- Betty McRae (Ali Liebert) – A tomboyish and skilled worker of German ancestry from the prairies, who thrives at the factory; their best worker, she is also in charge of training the Blue Shift's new girls. Because of this, she becomes the spokes-model for the factory in a war campaign film. Her hard, tough exterior masks her insecurity and feelings of being an outsider, due to her hidden lesbianism. Betty slowly becomes best friends with Kate, with whom she falls in love. After being rejected romantically by Kate, Betty becomes romantically involved with a soldier named Teresa. She goes to jail for Kate after taking the blame for the accidental death of Kate's father, though eventually is released and returns to working at the factory.
- Kate Andrews (Charlotte Hegele) – Born Marion Rowley, she is one of the factory's newest floor workers. Kate is on the run from her abusive, street-preacher father. Viewed as sheltered, naïve, and very shy, Kate slowly begins to break out of her perceived "shell". A talented singer, she befriends Leon Riley, who introduces her to jazz and gets her a job singing for his band. In the season one finale, she returns home with her father, who has managed to track her down. She returns to work at Victory Munitions in the second season, where she begins dating Betty's ex-boyfriend, Ivan, and eventually becomes engaged to him (though they later break up). After a factory explosion kills Ivan, Kate decides to quit the factory and follow her dreams to be a singer.

=== Supporting ===
- Vera Burr (Anastasia Phillips) – A worker on the Blue Shift, disfigured in an accident at the factory. Vera develops a close relationship with Archie while they're both in the hospital. At the end of season one, she sleeps with Harold Akins to secure the position of an office girl. It's implied that she had an abortion. She and Carol develop a rivalry in the office. During the second season, she and Marco have slowly been growing closer as well. Vera eventually starts picking up soldiers for casual encounters, as she enjoys the attention they give her and the gifts with which they shower her. Soon she becomes engaged with Marco but later dies.
- Marco Moretti (Antonio Cupo) – Italian-born factory worker who originally clashes heavily with Lorna. He is often discriminated against due to his family's heritage. He lives at home with his mother, his father being sent away to an internment camp. He falls in love with Lorna and has an affair with her with results in a pregnancy. Lorna leads him to believe that her husband is the baby's father. Marco struggles with how his Italian heritage colors him in the eyes of others because of the war.
- Ivan Buchinsky (Michael Seater) - An engineer at Victory Munitions who works during the Blue Shift, he is unable to serve in the military because of asthma. He bonds with Betty and becomes her "boyfriend". Betty later dumps him and he begins to date, Kate. The two eventually become engaged. But then Ivan calls off the wedding finding out about Kate, despite still being in love with each other. Ivan then dies without ever telling Kate that they he still wanted to marry her, even though he was with another girl, Helen, who was a Nazi spy.
- James Dunn (Sebastian Pigott) – A wealthy American citizen and Gladys' fiancé. He has an affair with Hazel which results in an STD. He is recruited into the army after the bombing of Pearl Harbor and is later killed by German bombing in England in June 1942.
- Bob Corbett (Peter Outerbridge) – Lorna's husband. Bob is a veteran of the first World War and was left crippled. He struggles to connect emotionally with his family. He develops a close friendship with Edith. Later he finds out about his wife's affair and pregnancy. He decides to remain at her side after she miscarries.
- Eugene "Gene" Corbett (Brett Dier) – Son of Lorna and Bob. Ace gunner promoted to sergeant. Had several close brushes with death in the war. He's an arrogant ladies man who develops an attraction for Gladys and suffers from PTSD.
- Harold Akins (Richard Fitzpatrick) Plant supervisor; the boss at Victory Munitions.
- Edith McCallum (Lisa Norton) – A widowed floor worker at Victory Munitions who is close friends with Lorna. She has a young son and daughter at home. She befriends Bob while dealing with the aftermath of her husband's death and unknowingly informs him of Lorna's pregnancy.
- Hazel MacDougall (Brittany Allen) – A factory girl on Red Shift (formerly Blue) who dislikes and causes trouble for Gladys. She has an affair with Gladys's fiancé, James, and gives him gonorrhea.
- Carol Demers (Carlyn Burchell) – Gladys' best friend. She works during the Blue Shift as an office girl. She keeps Gladys' secret about working on the floor until her father finds out with a surprise visit. She is somewhat of a snob and often looks down on the other factory girls as a lower class and enjoys her position in the office away from danger.
- Archie Arnott (Billy MacLellan) – A factory worker who becomes disabled after an explosive testing accident. He befriends Vera while at the hospital and later commits suicide with her help while suffering a painful death from sepsis.
- Leon Riley (Jim Codrington) – An African-Canadian man who works in the warehouse at Victory Munitions. A jazz musician and singer, he saves Kate from an attempted assault. The two slowly become friends, with Leon offering Kate advice and encouraging her musical abilities.
- Rollie Witham (James McGowan) – Gladys' father and the wealthy owner of a large chain of grocery stores.
- Adele Witham (Kate Hennig) – Gladys' mother. A socialite who masks her pain with alcohol, she convinces Lorna to help get Gladys fired in an attempt to control her daughter. She has yet to recover from her son's death and is prone to bouts of depression in which she disappears from her wifely duties as hostess.
- Sheila Corbett (Natasha Greenblatt) - Bob and Lorna's daughter, who works as a nurse's aide at the local hospital and is training to be a nurse. She eventually develops feelings for her colleague Dr. Patel.
- Narendra "Ned" Patel (Gabe Grey) - A doctor at the local hospital who treats Lorna when she is admitted, and later starts dating her daughter, Sheila.

== Episodes ==
=== Series overview ===
Season	Episodes	Originally released	
Season	Episodes	First released	Last released
1	6	January 4, 2012	February 8, 2012
2	12	January 2, 2013	April 29, 2013

=== Season 1 (2012) ===
No. overall	No. in season	Title	Directed by	Written by	Original release date	Viewers (millions)
1	1	"Jumping Tracks"	Adrienne Mitchell	Michael MacLennan	January 4, 2012	1.487
Young socialite Gladys Witham begins working at Victory Munitions, a bomb factory, at the start of World War II. Taking a job as a secretary during the factory's Blue Shift, Gladys arranges to become a floor worker instead, after being inspired by the other women floor workers. Kate Andrews, also a newcomer, has begun working at the factory after running away from her abusive father; she is reluctantly taken under the wing of Betty McRae, the factory's best worker. Blue Shift floor matron, Lorna Corbett, clashes with Marco Moretti, an Italian-born worker at the factory. Meanwhile, Vera Burr is severely injured while working on the assembly line, and ends up in the hospital.
2	2	"Misfires"	Adrienne Mitchell	Michael MacLennan	January 11, 2012	1.153
After an accident during bomb testing which leaves a factory worker, Archie Arnott, critically injured, the factory comes under scrutiny regarding safety regulations. The girls on the Blue Shift line are blamed for the accident, which results in Gladys attempting to get the girls to stand up for themselves. Vera, recovering in the hospital, grows depressed about the condition her injury has left her in. Meanwhile, Kate poses for pin-up photos in order to obtain a fake security clearance form, and Lorna uses Marco's Italian background to raise suspicions about him, resulting in him being fired.
3	3	"How You Trust"	Ken Girotti	Esta Spalding	January 18, 2012	1.086
After some of Gladys' things are stolen from her locker at the factory, she decides to find out who is behind the recent thefts. Lorna sends Kate to work in the storeroom as punishment, after suspecting Kate is the thief; while there, she befriends an African-Canadian man named Leon Riley. While tracking down another Blue Shift worker, Hazel, who Gladys believes is the thief, she discovers that Hazel has been sleeping with James, her fiancé. After going to Marco's house to drop off his paycheck, Lorna feels guilty about getting him fired; the two grow closer and eventually kiss.
4	4	"Bringing Up Bombshell"	Ken Girotti	John Krizanc	January 25, 2012	0.885
A propaganda newsreel is being filmed at Victory Munitions, and to her chagrin, Betty is chosen to be the spokesmodel for the factory. When the newsreel portrays her as a housewife with children, Betty is upset and angry with the director; she later confesses to Kate that she wishes she could be "that girl" in the film. After a slow start, Vera and Archie befriend each other in the hospital, and he attempts to talk her out of committing suicide. Meanwhile, Marco and Lorna consummate their affair, while Gladys, depressed about her fiancé's affair, looks for ways to act out.
5	5	"Armistice"	Anne Wheeler	Shelley Eriksen	February 1, 2012	0.932
It's Armistice Day, and the factory is planning on hosting an event to commemorate the holiday. However, everyone is at odds: James discovers that Gladys has been receiving letters from a soldier she'd accidentally agreed to marry, and the two fight over their respective indiscretions; Leon invites Kate to sing in a club with his band, which causes a rift between Betty and Kate; Lorna and her husband, Bob, clash after they find out that one of their sons is being awarded a medal for bravery. And at the hospital, Archie contracts sepsis and asks Vera to help him commit suicide, to end his suffering.
6	6	"Elements of Surprise"	Anne Wheeler	Michael MacLennan	February 8, 2012	1.039
Amidst the chaos following Japan's attack on Pearl Harbor, the girls on Blue Shift find themselves facing their own challenges. Gladys' parents discover she has been lying to them about her job at the factory and conspire to have her fired, while James is recruited into the military. Her affair with Marco has left Lorna pregnant, and she is at odds with how to deal with it. Vera is convinced to come back to work at the factory, but struggles with PTSD. Meanwhile, Kate and Betty deal with Kate's father, who has tracked her down, and Betty confesses her true feelings to Kate, with disastrous results.

=== Season 2 (2013) ===
On February 7, 2012, Bomb Girls was renewed by Shaw Media for a second season consisting of 12 episodes. The second season premiered on Global Canada January 2, 2013.

No. overall	No. in season	Title	Directed by	Written by	Original release date	Viewers (millions)
7	1	"The Quickening"	Adrienne Mitchell	Raymond Storey	January 2, 2013	1.126
Gladys has returned to work at the factory, this time with her parents' blessings, who are using her as part of an advertising campaign. However, she finds herself still at odds with them, wanting to do more to help the war effort. After being nearly outed, Betty scared of being fired, begins dating Ivan, an engineer on the Blue Shift. Lorna looks to terminate her pregnancy and turns to Vera for help. After months of searching, Betty finally finds Kate, but is met with resistance from Kate's father, who is later accidentally killed in a struggle. Betty and Kate cover up his death and Kate returns to her old job.
8	2	"Roses Red"	Adrienne Mitchell	Michael MacLennan	January 9, 2013	0.858
Kate is found by police detective who asks her to identify her father's body, unaware of her fake identity. His questions rattle Kate, and she considers leaving again to keep Betty safe. Betty's focus on Kate frustrates Ivan's attempts to move forward with his relationship with Betty. Gladys' fiancé, James, has returned for the holiday, but he reveals that he nearly failed his officer training and has a nervous breakdown. After plans to spend Valentine's Day with Gladys fall through, Vera ends up spending the evening with a dashing soldier. When Lorna suffers a miscarriage, Bob and Marco have a confrontation at the hospital.
9	3	"The Enemy Within"	Don McBearty	Alison Lea Bingeman	January 16, 2013	N/A
When Gladys finds out about Marco's father being held in an internment camp in Petawawa, she asks her father for his help in getting Marco's father a hearing. She accompanies Marco and Mrs. Moretti on a trip to the internment camp, but the trip leads to disaster, with Gladys, Marco, and Mrs. Moretti being held prisoner overnight. Kate has taken up drinking to cope with her depression and Leon suggests that Betty take Kate to his church for cheering up; Betty finds enlightenment in Leon's sermon and subsequently breaks up with Ivan. Meanwhile, Lorna attempts to teach life skills classes at VicMu, Bob looks for a job, and their son Eugene returns home on leave.
10	4	"Guests of Honour"	Don McBrearty	Joseph Kay	January 23, 2013	N/A
With Eugene home, Lorna plans a dinner in order to celebrate his success in the war; her doting on Eugene sets her at odds with Sheila, while Eugene is more interested in flirting with the girls of VicMu. Leon again reaches out to Kate, but she explains that singing no longer brings her joy. Betty matches wits and strength with an escaped German POW, who tells her she can't hide her true self forever. Kate is encouraged by Betty to move on with her life and decides to join Leon's choir. Vera and Carol are at odds due to their social and economic differences, but find themselves moving towards a tentative understanding.
11	5	"The Harder We Fight"	Jerry Ciccoritti	Julia Cohen	January 30, 2013	N/A
Tensions within the factory and at home come to a boiling point. Carol and Vera struggle to one-up each other in the fight to see who will win the coveted position of office manager. Gene continues to court Gladys, who finds herself drawn in by his daredevil attitude, despite heavy opposition from Lorna and Adele Witham, who disapprove. Betty takes an instant disliking to Reggie, a new arrival, viewing her as cocky and dangerous; after a brief fistfight, however, they call an uneasy truce. Kate focuses on her pursuit to get a boyfriend and accidentally draws the interest of Ivan. Meanwhile, Marco deals with harassment from a police officer.
12	6	"Where There's Smoke"	Jerry Ciccoritti	Michael MacLennan	February 6, 2013	N/A
Against the backdrop of a war bond event at Victory Munitions, sponsored by Witham Foods, everyone struggles with their own private war. Betty and Kate are forced to come to terms with their confusing friendship, which drives them apart; Kate seeks solace in Ivan while Betty grows close to a Women's Army Corps soldier, Teresa. At the insistence of Shelia, Lorna and Bob attempt to reach out to Eugene, who is suffering from battle fatigue, but with little success; Lorna finally agrees to let him return to the front lines to fight. After Gladys discovers her father has been paying for her room at the hotel, she looks to James for help, only to be devastated after he is killed in battle.
13	7	"Party Line"	Rachel Talalay	Michael MacLennan	March 25, 2013	N/A
It's harvest time and as the girls pluck the bounty of their victory garden, Vera uncovers a TNT shortage, shining an unwelcome light on the men of the Blue Shift – and jeopardizing her burgeoning friendship with Marco. Meanwhile, as preliminary reports of a successful raid on Dieppe are broadcast cross-country, Gladys isolates herself to fight her own private battles and Betty has an unexpected reunion with a soldier. Lorna fights for her long coveted home telephone, but any success is tempered by her growing fears for the safety of her sons.
14	8	"Fifth Column"	Rachel Talalay	Pamela Pinch & Raymond Storey	April 1, 2013	N/A
While out with the girls, Gladys finds herself a magnet of unwanted interest – first from a mystery man at the factory, and then from an overly-curious redhead at the Jewel Box who plies her with questions about the factory. Meanwhile, in a bid to get closer to her daughter, Lorna enlists Kate to volunteer with her at Sheila's hospital. Kate does her best to reach a shell-shocked soldier, while Lorna faces her own shocks from Sheila. Betty's budding relationship with Teresa intensifies – attracting some unwelcome attention.
15	9	"Something Fierce"	Bruce McDonald	Joseph Kay	April 8, 2013	N/A
Writing an article on Women at War, legendary and controversial journalist Dottie Shannon visits the factory – ruffling feathers and shining a light on the stark disparity between women and men's salaries. After this revelation, Lorna is torn – does she pursue a raise and risk the wrath of her male co-workers, or consent to the status quo "for the good of the war effort"? Gladys runs into Clifford Perry (Tahmoh Penikett) in the most unexpected of places and learns the true extent of the shadow-world of intelligence. Kate is faced with a career conundrum when she's offered the chance to sing in a live revue – only to discover that it's a bawdy burlesque show.
16	10	"Romeo Foxtrot"	Bruce McDonald	Alison Lea Bingeman	April 15, 2013	0.605
News that passenger ferry, SS Caribou has been torpedoed off Newfoundland in the Battle of the St. Lawrence, gives the war a new sense of urgency on the home front. Clifford impresses upon Gladys the importance of wartime intelligence and keeping tabs on her friends, but Vera misconstrues Gladys's newfound interest in Marco. Marco further questions his allegiances after his mother is wrongfully accused of stealing at Witham Foods. Lorna decides to give dance class a whirl and finds herself smitten with dancing and possibly with the teacher. Kate struggles with an unforeseen consequence in connection with her engagement to Ivan, while Betty personally experiences the difficult plight of being a soldier's girl.
17	11	"Kings and Pawns"	Paolo Barzman	Raymond Storey	April 22, 2013	N/A
The Governor General's upcoming tour of Victory Munitions has the factory in a whirl. On the surface it's all flowers and curtsies, but the Earl's visit has set many wheels in motion. Gladys is unsettled after being dismissed by Clifford who informs her that her intelligence has led to ensnaring Marco, a man she believes is decent, albeit misguided. Meanwhile, Marco's options are dwindling as he is appalled to learn that the non-violent anti-war statement he planned with Frank has morphed into something else – to be perfectly timed with the Earl's visit. Lorna enlists Bob in her ongoing dispute with Sheila, a move which backfires on Lorna.
18	12	"Blood Relations"	Paolo Barzman	Michael MacLennan	April 29, 2013	N/A
A blood drive calls on everyone at VicMu to donate to the boys fighting Rommel in Egypt and while some are eager to give, others feel uneasy about getting drained. Kate's glow in the wake of her happy reunion with her mother and her upcoming wedding is dimmed by the reappearance of Detective Brodie and his questions about her father's death. Clifford reveals the breadth of his talents to Gladys and he offers her an unexpected opportunity. Lorna grapples with decisions that could have life altering consequences for those she loves. Vera makes a clear statement vis-à-vis Marco, forcing him to examine old patterns. Meanwhile in a brave sacrifice, Betty demonstrates the ultimate expression of love.

== Production ==
The series was created by Michael MacLennan and Adrienne Mitchell and based on a concept by Debi Drennan and Maureen Jennings. Although set at the fictional Victory Munitions plant in Toronto, the series was based on the real accounts of workers from the DIL Ajax and the GECO Scarborough plants.

The first season was written by Michael MacLennan, Esta Spalding, John Krizanc, and Shelley Eriksen and directed by Adrienne Mitchell, Ken Girotti, and Anne Wheeler. The executive producers are Janis Lundman, Michael MacLennan, Adrienne Mitchell, and Michael Prupas. The first season producer is Wendy Grean. The editors are Teresa De Luca and Tad Seaborn. Éric Cayla does cinematography on the show. Aidan Leroux is the production designer, Joanne Hansen is the costume designer, Valentine Prokop is in the sound department, and Marie Nardella is in makeup department. Mario Rachiele adds visual effects to the program. The score is composed by Peter Chapman, and music supervision is by Andrea Higgins of Arpix Media.

The series was filmed in Toronto with a converted furniture factory in Etobicoke standing for the Victory Munitions Factory. Season 1 was filmed from September 12 to November 16, 2011. Muse Entertainment and Back Alley Film Productions are the production companies. In Canada, the series is distributed by Shaw Media; internationally the series is distributed by Muse Distribution International.

In April 2013, Global TV and Shaw Media announced that Bomb Girls would not return for a third season. They did, however, suggest that a two-hour TV movie serving as a series finale was in the works and was planned air in 2014. Disappointed viewers launched an internet campaign in an effort to get this decision reversed.

== Bomb Girls: Facing the Enemy ==
In October 2013, Shaw Media announced that production had begun on a two-hour television film. The original cast, including Meg Tilly, Jodi Balfour, Charlotte Hegele, Ali Liebert, Antonio Cupo, Anastasia Phillips, Michael Seater, and Peter Outerbridge reprised their roles. The film was shot in Toronto and Hamilton until November 20, 2013. This was confirmed by Ali Liebert. The film, titled Bomb Girls: Facing the Enemy, premiered on Global TV in Canada on March 27, 2014 and was later aired on Reelz in the United States on May 26, 2014.

Title	Directed by	Written by	Original release date
Bomb Girls: Facing the Enemy	Jerry Ciccoritti	Donald Martin	March 27, 2014
In the darkest hour of the war for the Allied Intelligence in spring 1943, a new and disturbing menace appears - a saboteur among the factory workers. Bomb Girl Gladys Witham is recruited to find the traitor on the new line and she must spy on her best friends, co-workers and fellow agents.

== Awards and nominations ==
Awards and nominations received by Bomb Girls
Awards	Year	Category	Nominee(s)	Result	Ref.
ACTRA Awards	2014	Outstanding Performance – Female	Meg Tilly	Nominated	
Canadian Cinema Editors Awards	2012	Best Editing in Long Form Television Series	Teresa De Luca	Nominated	
Canadian Screen Awards	2013	Best Costume Design	Joanne Hansen	Won	
Canadian Screen Awards	2013	Best Cross-Platform Project, Fiction	Noora Abu Eitah, Marty Flanagan, Susan Alexander, Ryan Andal, Lori Harito, James Milward, Pietro Gagliano, Chris Harris (for Bomb Girls Interactive)	Nominated	
Canadian Screen Awards	2013	Best Direction in a Dramatic Series	Adrienne Mitchell	Nominated	
Canadian Screen Awards	2013	Best Dramatic Series	Janis Lundman, Michael Prupas, Michael MacLennan, Adrienne Mitchell	Nominated	
Canadian Screen Awards	2013	Best Performance by an Actress in a Continuing Leading Dramatic Role	Meg Tilly	Won	
Canadian Screen Awards	2013	Best Photography in a Dramatic Program or Series	Éric Cayla	Nominated	
Canadian Screen Awards	2013	Best Production Design or Art Direction in a Fiction Program or Series	Aidan Leroux	Won	
Canadian Screen Awards	2014	Best Achievement in Make-Up	Eva Coudouloux, Katarina Chovanec	Nominated	
Canadian Screen Awards	2014	Best Achievement in Casting	Lisa Parasyn, Jon Comerford	Won	
Canadian Screen Awards	2014	Best Costume Design	Debra Hanson	Won	
Canadian Screen Awards	2014	Best Dramatic Series	Adrienne Mitchell, Janis Lundman, Michael MacLennan, Michael Prupas	Nominated	
Canadian Screen Awards	2014	Best Performance by an Actress in a Continuing Leading Dramatic Role	Meg Tilly	Nominated	
Canadian Screen Awards	2014	Best Photography in a Dramatic Program or Series	Éric Cayla	Nominated	
Canadian Screen Awards	2015	Best Achievement in Make-Up	Katarina Chovanec, Eva Coudouloux (for Bomb Girls: Facing the Enemy)	Nominated	
Canadian Screen Awards	2015	Best Dramatic Mini-Series or TV Movie	Janis Lundman, Adrienne Mitchell, Michael Prupas (for Bomb Girls: Facing the Enemy)	Won	
Canadian Screen Awards	2015	Best Performance by an Actress in a Featured Supporting Role in a Dramatic Program or Series	Ali Liebert (for Bomb Girls: Facing the Enemy)	Won	
Canadian Screen Awards	2015	Best Performance by an Actress in a Leading Role in a Dramatic Program or Mini-Series	Jodi Balfour (for Bomb Girls: Facing the Enemy)	Won	
Canadian Screen Awards	2015	Best Photography in a Dramatic Program or Series	Éric Cayla (for Bomb Girls: Facing the Enemy)	Nominated	
Directors Guild of Canada Awards	2013	Best Production Design – Television Series	Aidan Leroux	Nominated	
Directors Guild of Canada Awards	2014	Best Production Design – Television Series	Aidan Leroux	Nominated	
Directors Guild of Canada Awards	2015	Television Movie/Mini-Series	Directing Team (for Bomb Girls: Facing the Enemy)	Nominated	
Directors Guild of Canada Awards	2015	Best Production Design – Television Movie/Mini-Series	Aidan Leroux (for Bomb Girls: Facing the Enemy)	Nominated	
Directors Guild of Canada Awards	2015	Best Picture Editing – Television Movie/Mini-Series	Tad Seaborn (for Bomb Girls: Facing the Enemy)	Nominated	
Directors Guild of Canada Awards	2015	Best Sound Editing – Television Movie/Mini-Series	Peter Lopata, Jill Purdy (for Bomb Girls: Facing the Enemy)	Nominated	
Golden Nymph Awards	2013	Best Drama TV Series	Back Alley Film Productions, Muse Entertainment	Nominated	
Golden Nymph Awards	2013	Outstanding Actress in a Drama Series	Meg Tilly	Nominated	
Gracie Allen Awards	2013	Outstanding Drama	Back Alley Film Productions, Muse Entertainment	Won	
Leo Awards	2012	Best Supporting Performance by a Female in a Dramatic Series	Ali Liebert	Nominated	
Leo Awards	2012	Best Lead Performance by a Female in a Dramatic Series	Meg Tilly	Won	
Leo Awards	2013	Best Lead Performance by a Female in a Dramatic Series	Meg Tilly	Won	
Leo Awards	2013	Best Supporting Performance by a Female in a Dramatic Series	Ali Liebert	Won	
Leo Awards	2013	Best Lead Performance by a Female in a Dramatic Series	Jodi Balfour	Nominated	
Leo Awards	2014	Best Guest Performance by a Male in a Dramatic Series	Brett Dier	Nominated	
Leo Awards	2015	Best Supporting Performance by a Male in a Television Movie	Antonio Cupo (for Bomb Girls: Facing the Enemy)	Won	

== See also ==
- Canadian Industries Limited#World War II, munitions industry in WWII
- List of awards and nominations received by Bomb Girls
- List of programs broadcast by Global
