= Maia Campbell =

American film and television actress

- Born: Takoma Park, Maryland, U.S.
- Education: Spelman College
- Occupation: Actress
- Years active: 1993–2017
- Known for: Tiffany Warren – In the House
- Children: 1
- Parent(s): Bebe Moore Campbell; Tiko Campbell

Maia Campbell is an American former actress known for her roles as Tiffany Warren on the NBC/UPN sitcom In the House (1995–1999), and Nicole on the 1994 Fox comedy-drama series South Central.

== Early life and career ==
Born in Takoma Park, Maryland, Campbell is the daughter of author Bebe Moore Campbell (1950–2006) and Tiko Campbell (1947–2012), an architect and author from Washington, D.C.

At age 16, Campbell made her first on-screen appearance in John Singleton's 1993 romantic drama Poetic Justice, playing the role of Lucky's (played by Tupac Shakur) cousin, Shante. She was featured in a regular role in the short-lived Fox series South Central, portraying Larenz Tate's girlfriend, Nicole. In 1995, Campbell began portraying the principle role of Tiffany Warren on the NBC sitcom In the House. The show ran for five seasons before being cancelled in 1999. Between 1996 and 1998, she guest starred in Beverly Hills, 90210, Moesha, and Sister, Sister. In March 1999, she was the leading lady in Tyrese's music video for "Sweet Lady". The same year, she appeared in the coming-of-age comedy film Trippin' as Cinny Hawkins, the most beautiful and intelligent girl in school and love interest. In 2000, Campbell played the role of Ashley in the Showtime television film Seventeen Again, alongside Tia, Tamera, and Tahj Mowry. Her last on-screen acting credit came in 2008's low-budget film, The Rimshop.

== Personal life ==
After an incident while on the set of In the House in 1998, Campbell was diagnosed with bipolar disorder. Two years later in 2000, Campbell gave birth to her daughter Elisha, but since she refused to take her psychiatric medication, she lost custody.

In 2009, a YouTube video was uploaded to the internet of Campbell exhibiting erratic behavior, causing fans to become concerned. In a statement to Essence, Campbell's stepfather Ellis Gordon Jr. stated "As a family, we have been struggling with Maia in her illness for quite some time," he continued, "We continue to hold fast to our faith and hope that some day she will realize that healing will begin when she decides to reach out and accept the help and treatment that have been offered to her."

In a 2012 sit-down with inspirational speaker Iyanla Vanzant, Campbell stated that in 2010, she was arrested for petty theft and sent to jail, however her stepfather, Ellis, requested that she be moved to a mandatory mental health facility where she spent a year and a half before voluntarily moving to a residential treatment center.

== Filmography ==
=== Film ===
Year	Title	Role	Notes
1993	Poetic Justice	Shante	Film debut
1998	Kinfolks	Lissa	
1999	Trippin'	Cinny Hawkins	
2000	Seventeen Again	Ashley	TV Movie
2002	The Trial	Tracy	
2003	With or Without You	Teresa	
2004	Sweet Potato Pie	Kadja	Direct-to-video
2005	Friends and Lovers	Lisa	Direct-to-video
2005	The Luau	Shyann	
2005	Envy	Tommie	
2007	Sorority Sister Slaughter	Rose	Direct-to-video
2008	The Rimshop	Misty	
2017	Doctor Impostor	Doreen DuVernay	

=== Television ===
Year	Title	Role	Notes
1993	Thea	Alison	Episode: "Dirty Laundry"
1994	South Central	Nicole	Recurring cast
1995–99	In the House	Tiffany Warren	Main cast
1996–97	Beverly Hills, 90210	Mariah Murphy	Episode: "Remember the Alamo" & "Heaven Scent"
1997	Moesha	Tammy	Episode: "Double Date"
1998	Sister, Sister	Shayla	Episode: "The Grass Is Always Finer"
2012	Iyanla, Fix My Life	Herself	Episode: "Fix My Celebrity Life"
2013	Life After	Herself	Episode: "Maia Campbell: In the House"
2016	From the Bottom Up	Herself	BET Docu-series

=== Music videos ===
- LL Cool J – "Ain't Nobody" (1996)
- Lil' Kim – "Not Tonight" (1997)
- Tyrese Gibson – "Sweet Lady" (1999)
- Tyrese Gibson – "Lately" (1999)
- Jaheim - "Just In Case" (2001)
- Fat Joe – "What's Luv?" (2002)
- Brandy – "Talk About Our Love" (2004)

== Awards and nominations ==
Year	Award	Category	Title of work	Result
1996	Young Artist Award	Best Performance by a Young Actress – TV Comedy Series	In the House	Nominated
