= In the House (TV series) =

American sitcom

- Genre: Sitcom
- Created by: Winifred Hervey
- Starring: LL Cool J; Maia Campbell; Debbie Allen; Jeffery Wood; Kim Wayans; Alfonso Ribeiro
- Theme music composer: Quincy Jones III; Theodore Miller; Kurt Farquhar
- Composers: Quincy Jones III (1995–96); Theodore Miller (1996–98); Kurt Farquhar (1999)
- Country of origin: United States
- Original language: English
- No. of seasons: 5
- No. of episodes: 76 (list of episodes)

Production
- Executive producers: David Salzman; Bob Burris; Gary Hardwick; Winifred Hervey; Quincy Jones; Michael Ware
- Producers: Walter Allen Bennett, Jr.; Teri Schaffer Hicks; Michelle Jones; Werner Walian
- Camera setup: Multi-camera
- Running time: 22 minutes
- Production companies: Winifred Hervey Productions; Quincy Jones/David Salzman Entertainment; NBC Productions; NBC Studios

Original release
- Network: NBC
- Release: April 10, 1995 – May 13, 1996
- Network: UPN
- Release: August 26, 1996 – April 7, 1998
- Network: Syndication
- Release: August 3 – August 11, 1999

In the House is an American sitcom television series starring LL Cool J, Debbie Allen, Maia Campbell, Jeffery Wood, Alfonso Ribeiro and Kim Wayans. The series aired for two seasons on NBC from April 1995 to May 1996 after which it was canceled due to low ratings. UPN quickly picked up In the House where it aired for an additional two seasons. UPN canceled the series in May 1998. The series ran in first-run syndication for a fifth and final season, which ended on August 11, 1999.

== Synopsis ==
Marion Hill (LL Cool J) is a former professional football player. Because of his financial predicament, Marion is forced to rent out most of the rooms in his house to newly divorced single mother Jackie Warren (Debbie Allen) and her two children, Tiffany (Maia Campbell) and Austin (Jeffery Wood).

After the second season, the series was retooled, becoming more adult-oriented. Jackie and Austin both moved back East while Tiffany stayed with Marion to finish high school. Joining the cast for the third season was former Fresh Prince of Bel-Air star Alfonso Ribeiro as Dr. Maxwell "Max" Stanton and In Living Color cast member Kim Wayans as Tonia Harris. Both Maxwell and Tonia helped Marion manage the Los Angeles sports clinic he owns, then Tonia leaves for the WNBA after Season 4, and Tiffany leaves after only two episodes in Season 5.

== Episodes ==
Season	Episodes	Originally released		
Season	Episodes	First released	Last released	Network
1	6	April 10, 1995	May 15, 1995	NBC
2	20	September 18, 1995	May 13, 1996	NBC
3	22	August 26, 1996	May 19, 1997	UPN
4	22	August 25, 1997	April 7, 1998	UPN
5	6	August 3, 1999	August 11, 1999	Syndication

== Cast ==
=== Main ===
- LL Cool J as Marion Hill
- Maia Campbell as Tiffany Warren
- Debbie Allen as Jackie Warren (seasons 1–2)
- Jeffery Wood as Austin Warren (seasons 1–2)
- Kim Wayans as Tonia Harris (seasons 2–4)
- Alfonso Ribeiro as Dr. Maxwell Stanton (seasons 3–5)
- Dee Jay Daniels as Rodney (season 3, episodes 1–7)

=== Recurring ===
- Lisa Arrindell Anderson as Heather Comstock (seasons 1–2)
- Dawn McMillan as Sasha (season 1–2)
- Michael Warren as Milton Warren (season 1–2)
- John Amos as Coach Sam Wilson (season 1–3)
- Chris Browning as Clayton (season 2)
- Richard F. Whiten as Henry (season 3)
- Mari Morrow as Amber (season 3)
- Eric Howell Sharp as Benny (season 3)
- Ken Lawson as Carl (season 3–5)
- Gabrielle Carmouche as Raynelle (season 3–5)
- Paulette Braxton as Natalie Davis (season 4)
- Luis Antonio Ramos as Tito Barrientos (season 4)
- Mel Jackson as Graham (season 4)
- Derek McGrath as Bernie/Agent Dick Kelly (season 3-4)
- Phil Morris as Goldwire (season 4)
- Chaz Lamar Shepherd as Mark (season 4)
- Lark Voorhies as Mercedes Langford (seasons 4–5)
- Joan Pringle as Patricia Hill (season 4–5)
- Kenya Moore as Valerie Bridgeforth (season 5)

== U.S. television ratings ==
Season	TV season	Network	Ratings Rank	Viewers (in millions)
1	1995	NBC	#44	11.1
2	1995–1996	NBC	#59	9.4
3	1996–1997	UPN	#189	3.3
4	1997–1998	UPN	#152	2.8

== Awards and nominations ==
Year	Award	Result	Category	Recipient
1996	Young Artist Awards	Nominated	Best Performance by an Actor Under Ten – Television	Jeffery Wood
1996	Young Artist Awards	Nominated	Best Performance by a Young Actress – TV Comedy Series	Maia Campbell
1996	NAACP Image Awards	Nominated	Outstanding Supporting Actor in a Comedy Series	John Amos
1996	NAACP Image Awards	Nominated	Outstanding Lead Actor in a Comedy Series	LL Cool J
1996	NAACP Image Awards	Nominated	Outstanding Comedy Series	-
1997	NAACP Image Awards	Nominated	Outstanding Lead Actor in a Comedy Series	LL Cool J
1998	NAACP Image Awards	Nominated	Outstanding Lead Actor in a Comedy Series	LL Cool J
1998	NAACP Image Awards	Won	Outstanding Supporting Actor in a Comedy Series	Alfonso Ribeiro
1999	NAACP Image Awards	Nominated	Outstanding Supporting Actor in a Comedy Series	Alfonso Ribeiro
1997	Emmy Award	Nominated	Outstanding Lighting Direction (Electronic) for a Comedy Series	Art Busch (For episode "Curse of the Hill House")

== Syndication ==
The show aired in off-network syndication during the 1999–2000 season; the series had rerun weeknights at 7pm EST on New York City's local UPN affiliate WWOR-TV until it was replaced by The Jamie Foxx Show reruns in fall 2000, and on TV One from 2004 to 2008. On June 13, 2016, BET aired reruns of the show in the earlier months on the weekdays in random times from 2:30AM to 4:00AM on Fridays until the week of August 29 to September 2, 2016. The series also aired reruns on BET Her. Aspire began airing reruns of the show on August 1, 2020.

On November 1, 2021, In the House began streaming on HBO Max. Since January 1, 2024, the show is currently airing on 365BLK.
