= Trippin' (film) =

1999 film by David Raynr

- Theatrical release poster
- Directed by: David Raynr
- Written by: Gary Hardwick
- Produced by: Marc Abraham; Caitlin Scanlon; Thomas Bliss
- Starring: Deon Richmond; Maia Campbell; Donald Faison; Guy Torry
- Cinematography: John B. Aronson
- Edited by: Earl Watson
- Music by: Michel Colombier
- Production company: Beacon Pictures
- Distributed by: Rogue Pictures; October Films
- Release date: May 12, 1999
- Running time: 94 minutes
- Country: United States
- Language: English
- Budget: $3 million
- Box office: $9 million

Trippin' is a 1999 American comedy film/coming of age film directed by David Raynr and starring Deon Richmond, Maia Campbell, Donald Faison, and Guy Torry. The film provided one of Anthony Anderson's earliest film roles.

== Plot ==
Greg is nearing the end of his high school days as graduation slowly approaches. He is also anxiously awaiting prom and has the hopes of going with Cinny, the school's local beauty. As he tries to ask his parents for help paying for prom, they begin nagging him after finding out he hasn’t filled out one college application, telling him they won’t give a dime until he fills one out. Along with these wants, Greg is also an avid daydreamer and is always daydreaming ("trippin'") over everything.

== Cast ==
- Deon Richmond as Gregory Reed
- Maia Campbell as Cinny Hawkins
- Donald Faison as June Nelson
- Guy Torry as Fish
- Aloma Wright as Louise Reed
- Harold Sylvester as Willie Reed
- Cleavon McClendon as Jamal Reed
- Bill Henderson as Gramps Reed
- Michael Warren as Shapic
- Countess Vaughn as Anetta Jones
- Stoney Jackson as Kenyatta
- Dartanyan Edmonds as LaDomal
- Anthony Anderson as Z-Boy

== Production notes ==
Trippin' was filmed on location in California in the city of Los Angeles in 1998. Narbonne High School in Harbor City was used for most of the film's school shots. Harbor City in Los Angeles was also a location used for filming as some of the film's scenes take place on the RMS Queen Mary. The working title of the film while it was in production was G's Trippin, but this was later shortened to its before release.

== Reception ==
Trippin' was poorly received by critics. On the review aggregator website Rotten Tomatoes, 18% of 28 critics' reviews are positive, with an average rating of 4.4/10. The website's consensus reads: "Trippin' struggles to balance its raunchy teen comedy elements against an unfortunate tendency towards preachy moralizing."

Robert Dominguez of the New York Daily News wrote: "Picture Walter Mitty as a black high school senior and you get the essence of 'Trippin'', a disjointed, lowbrow comedy about a teen coping with his uncertain future through daydreams. Unlike Danny Kaye's milquetoast Mitty character, however, Greg Reed's (Deon Richmond) flights of fancy are often raunchy, R-rated affairs complete with a rap music score and scantily clad video vixens which should appeal mightily to the film's urban-teen target market." He added that the film "trips up on its own scattershot plot and stereotypes, losing steam early once the novelty of Greg's fantasies wears off." Lawrence Van Gelder of The New York Times wrote:

Wrapped like candy in a sure-fire come-on of bouncing bosoms and firm young female bodies, "Trippin'' is a sermon aimed primarily at teen-age black male high school students.

The message: Get real. Get a diploma. Try to go to college.

And the payoff for this effort?

Why, you get to have all the sex you want with the prom queen.

"Trippin"' is a juvenile comedy with its heart in the right place and its airy head incapable of applying logic to its script.

Gene Seymour of the Los Angeles Times called the film "serviceable as an undemanding date movie. It’s not too dissimilar from the teen movies that have proliferated this season; Trippin' looks a lot like an Afterschool Special goosed with dirty words and R-rated sex. With its energetic young cast and flashes of insolence, you wish for more coherence and less meandering in the script. You also wish it would goof on its own didactic impulses. That way, even if it didn’t make sense, you wouldn’t care." Steve Murray of The Atlanta Journal-Constitution wrote that the film "keeps trippin’ up on its own mixed message" by "pandering to the basic instincts of its target teen audience. One dream scene features a recruited from a college called 'Morehoward', known as 'Mo Ho' for short. And we get the spectacle of June turning a naked woman into a banana split via whipped cream and chocolate sauce. When June calls a woman a 'bitch', the movie lets her punch him out. He also gets his comeuppance from the many girls he’s lied to. Still, it doesn’t compensate for the ways 'Trippin'' presents most of its women as playthings. Even Cinny never gets to be more than an idealized dream girl One of the film’s subplots has June getting pressed into service by the neighborhood drug dealer The plot seems to be an excuse to trot out a “Terminator”-style fantasy for G an ammo-heavy revenge scenario that’s difficult to enjoy so soon after the Littleton, Colo., slayings. Oh, and for the record, this is another of the countless recent teen flicks that climax at a prom. Nick Carter of the Milwaukee Journal Sentinel said:

You think it’s crazy to make a movie running through the oldest and boldest caricatures and stereotypes of African-American culture?

Then you must be Trippin', as this crazed comedic and "afroeccentric” vision from a teenage boy’s mind will have just about all who watch it both cracking up and dropping their jaws in their laps.

Think of Trippin'—the latest from Rogue Pictures—as a hip comedy with attitude pulled from the rich and deep wells of ghetto culture and folklore.

Renee Graham of The Boston Globe gave the film only one star and wrote that it "manages to prove only that Hollywood finds black teens as inane, thick-headed, uninspired, and sex-mad as their white counterparts", adding:

The movie is stupidly written by Gary Hardwick, flatly directed by David Raynr, and poorly acted by all involved; the mind boggles to think that someone somewhere thought this mess would work as a movie. And I'm still trying to figure out the film's connection to LA Lakers star Shaquille O'Neal, whose TWISM (which stands for The World Is Mine) clothing line gets plenty of screen time. Still, its inclusion in a film this terrible isn't likely to send sales soaring. Trippin' " is one trip to be avoided at the movies.

Mick LaSalle of the San Francisco Chronicle castigated the film, writing:

"Trippin'" is the movie equivalent of a bug not worth squishing. But I have my shoes on anyway, and there's no point in holding back. Bad movie! Bad movie! Bad! Bad!

It's not only bad. It's bad, and the climactic scene takes place at the high school prom. It's bad, and it has a romantic hero who tells the girl he likes that he wants to "hit" her rear-end "like a home run in the ninth inning." She likes him because he's sensitive.

The screenwriter of this mess, Gary Hardwick, claims to have written "Trippin'" in all of two weeks. It's hard to believe a writer could type that slowly. This is a formula script, pure and simple. It was either written cynically, by someone following a formula, or sincerely, by someone who can think only in formula. Hard to say which is worse.

[...]

The picture's lone distinguishing feature is that Greg does a lot of daydreaming—or "trippin'"—so the picture flows in and out of fantasy sequences. Greg is surrounded by beautiful women. Greg is a big shot at college. Then Greg wakes up.

Deon Richmond brings some good nature to the role of Greg, but he has no comic charm. It's a terrible burden for a young actor. If Richmond is not, on his own, worth watching, there's no movie.

Roger Ebert's review was somewhat more favorable; in it, he wrote:

The movie is sweet, but predictable, and we get about three more daydreams than we really require. Richmond and Campbell both possess radiant smiles, which is important in a movie where a character's appearance supplies at least half of his character development. Whether Richmond and Campbell will someday be getting better roles is impossible to predict, but on the basis of their work here, it's not implausible. Did I like the movie? Not enough to recommend it, except to someone who really wants to see another senior prom cliffhanger. Still, there are so many grim and gritty urban violence movies that it's good to see nice African-American kids in a comedy, even if it's so lacking in imagination that it finds it necessary to hang them upside down.

Terry Lawson of the Detroit Free Press wrote that "it's not difficult to figure out where "Trippin' " is headed, but compared to most movies aimed at young African-Americans, it takes the high road." Jeff Strickler of the Minneapolis Star Tribune wrote that "the characters are likable—so much so that you feel sorry for them for getting stuck in this umpteenth story about a guy who lies to impress a woman and then gets caught in his lies." In Canada, Norman Wilner wrote in The Toronto Star that the film "takes a perfectly good coming-of-age story and wrecks it by piling on a lot of dopey trimmings."

The film made $2,527,909 its opening weekend and grossed a total of $9,017,070 during its theatrical run.

== Release ==
Trippin' was released during the start of the summer movie season of 1999. It was released in a limited number of theaters compared to the summer blockbusters released around the same time. The film did well enough to crack the top ten in gross receipts during its first few weeks of release.
