= Ali Liebert =

Canadian actress, model and producer

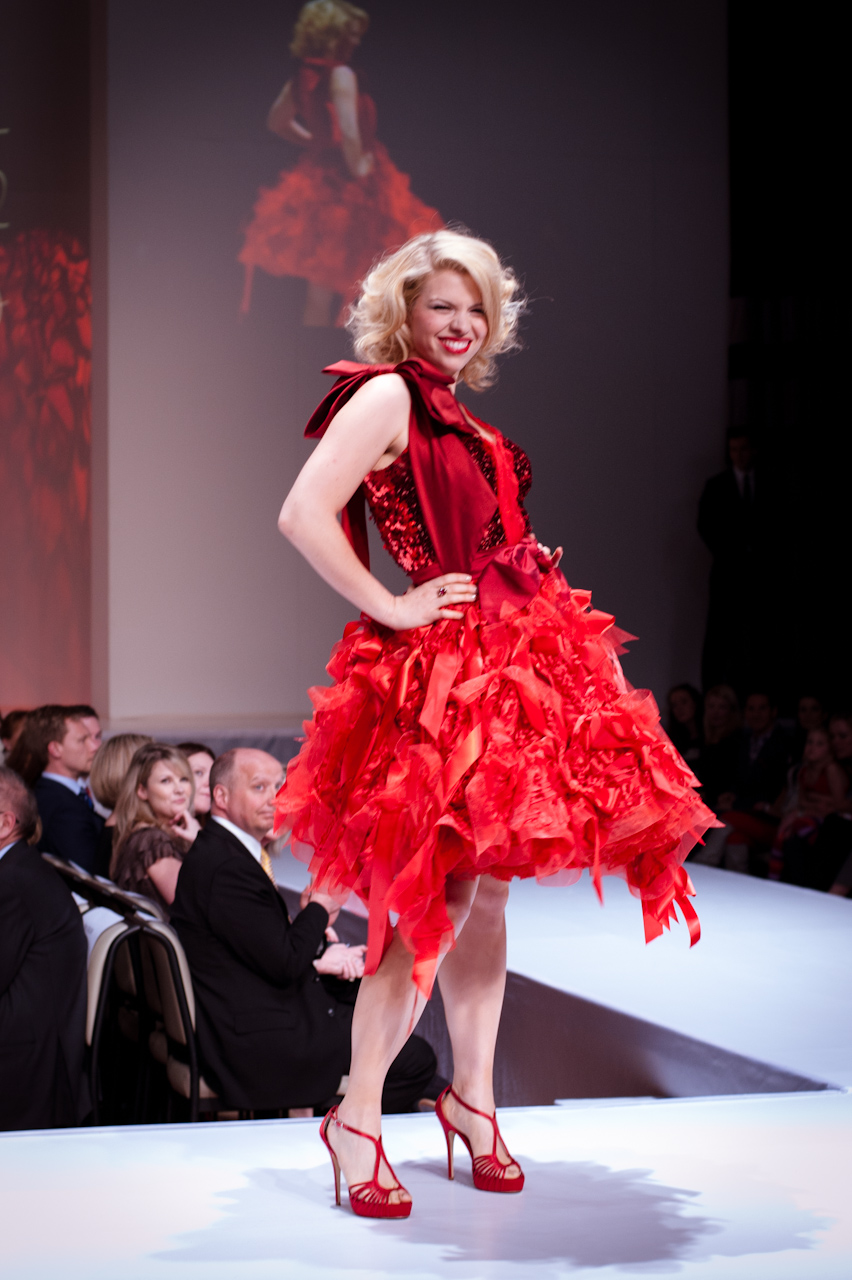
- Liebert wearing Momo at 2012 The Heart Truth celebrity fashion show in Toronto
- Born: Alison Dyan Liebert; Surrey, British Columbia, Canada
- Occupations: Actress, model, film producer
- Years active: 2003–present
- Website: www.aliliebertfilm.com

Alison Dyan Liebert is a Canadian actress, director, model and producer. She was a recipient of a Canadian Screen Award for work in the wartime series Bomb Girls.

== Life and career ==
Liebert is a British Columbia native, born in Surrey and raised in Duncan. She has had a keen interest in performing from a young age. After graduating from high school, Liebert attended the Canadian College of Performing Arts in Victoria for two years before moving to Vancouver to pursue her dream of becoming a successful television and film actress. Her first major stage role was in the musical A Flask of Bourbon, playing the role of Veronica.

Her television credits include roles on Fringe, The L Word, Kyle XY, Mech-X4 and a recurring role on Intelligence. In 2008, Liebert was cast as a lead in Sook-Yin Lee's film debut, Year of the Carnivore, the Cuba Gooding Jr. feature Hardwired as well as Blaine Thurier's A Gun to the Head. She also subsequently appeared in the second of three Molson Canadian commercials titled "It's an unwritten code in Canada...". In 2012, Liebert's recent role as Betty, in the wartime miniseries Bomb Girls, received much critical acclaim including a Canadian Screen Award in 2015. Liebert is queer and has discussed using her work to support queer representation.

In 2011, Liebert founded Sociable Films, a boutique film production company based in Vancouver with Nicholas Carella and Michelle Ouellet. Through her company, she has produced projects such as Afterparty, A Heart Unbroken, Salvator and This Feels Nice, currently in post-production.

She directed the 2022 television film The Holiday Sitter.

In 2023, Liebert acted opposite Humberly González in Friends and Family Christmas, The Hallmark Channel's first Christmas romantic comedy featuring a lesbian couple.

== Filmography ==
=== Film ===
Year	Title	Role	Notes
2005	Playing the Role	The Reader	Short film
2008	Basket Casket	Woman	Short film
2009	Helen	Donna	
2009	Year of the Carnivore	Sylvia	
2009	A Gun to the Head	Jill	
2009	Hardwired	Catalina Jones	
2009	The Break-Up Artist	Tiffany	
2010	Karma Inc.	Shirley	Short film
2010	A Fine Young Man	Mary Adams	Short film
2010	Voodoo	Marjorie	Short film
2011	Barbie: Princess Charm School	Portia / Hadley (voice)	Video
2011	Afghan Luke	Miss Freedom	
2011	Apollo 18	Nate's Girlfriend	
2011	Sisters & Brothers	Tracy	
2011	The Rock Shirt	Girl	Short film
2012	Foxfire: Confessions of a Girl Gang	Muriel Orvis	
2012	In the Hive	Parker Whitmore	
2013	Barbie in the Pink Shoes	Tara / Hannah (voice)	Video
2013	Down River	Molly	
2013	Afterparty	Tracy	
2014	Barbie and the Secret Door	Youngling Fairy (voice)	Video
2014	Bad City	Field Reporter	
2015	The Devout	Jan	
2016	Collider	Dawn Lanyon	Short film
2017	Wonder	Ms. Petosa	
2018	Cooking with Love	Kelly	TV movie
2023	Friends and Family Christmas	Amelia	TV movie
2024	Breathe	Vanessa	

=== Television ===
Year	Title	Role	Notes
2003	Dead Like Me	Marcie	"Rest in Peace"
2004	The L Word	Rebecca	"Let's Do It"
2004	5ive Days to Midnight	Student in Hall	Television mini-series
2004	The 4400	Maureen	"The New and Improved Carl Morrissey"
2004	Huff	Jenny	"Pilot"
2005	Cold Squad	Secretary	"Mr. Bad Example"
2005	Young Blades	Charlotte	"Wanted", "The Girl from Upper Gaborski"
2005	Killer Instinct	Dr. Kit Ellsworth	"Forget Me Not", "Shake, Rattle, and Roll"
2006	Romeo!	Hip Young Lady	"Ro Trip"
2006	Whistler	Merewynn	"After the Fall"
2006	All She Wants for Christmas	Priscilla Clark	Television film (Lifetime)
2006–07	Intelligence	Rebecca	Recurring role
2007	Robson Arms	Hottie	"Saultology"
2007	Fallen	Chloe	"The Time of the Redeemer"
2007	Blood Ties	Maya	"Drawn and Quartered"
2008	Psych	Hannah	"Shawn (and Gus) of the Dead"
2008	The Secret Lives of Second Wives	Brooke	Television film (Lifetime)
2008	The Dead Beat	Audrey	Television film
2009	Kyle XY	Jackie	Recurring role
2009	Harper's Island	Nikki Bolton	Main role
2009	Health Nutz	Tami Erickson	5 episodes
2009	Fringe	Danielle	"August"
2009	Wolf Canyon	Jan	Unsold TV pilot
2010	Human Target	Brooke Hammel	"Rewind"
2011	Hellcats	Theresa	"Fancy Dan"
2011	Health Nutz	Tami	Television series
2011	Earth's Final Hours	Darlene	Television film (Syfy)
2012	Virtual Lies	Allison Dean	Television film (Lifetime)
2012	Love at the Thanksgiving Day Parade	Jaclyn	Television film (Hallmark Channel)
2012–13	Bomb Girls	Betty McRae	Main role
2013	Tom Dick & Harriet	Liz	Television film (Hallmark Channel)
2013	The True Heroines	Ethel Worthington	Television series
2013	Lost Girl	Crystal	"Sleeping Beauty School", "Lovers. Apart.", "Turn to Stone"
2014	Ring by Spring	Stephanie Kirkwood	Television film (Hallmark Channel)
2014	Bomb Girls: Facing the Enemy	Betty McRae	Television film (Global)
2014	Motive	Erin Kovach	"A Bullet for Joey"
2014	A Fairly Odd Summer	Mrs. Mulligan	Live-action television film (Nickelodeon)
2014–15	Strange Empire	Fiona Briggs	Recurring role
2015	I Do, I Do, I Do	Kate	Television film (Hallmark Channel)
2015	The Unauthorized Full House Story	Gay Saget	Television film (Lifetime)
2015	Christmas Truce	Alina	Television film (A&E)
2016–17	Mech-X4	Principal Grey	Television series
2016	Paranormal Solutions Inc.	Det. Crystal Snider	3 episodes
2016	Anything for Love	Debbie	Television film (Hallmark Channel)
2016	Legends of Tomorrow	Nurse Lindsey Carlisle	"Night of the Hawk"
2016	iZombie	Annie Rosine / Jenny Rosine	"He Blinded Me... With Science"
2016	Chesapeake Shores	Georgia Eyles	3 episodes
2016	Autumn in the Vineyard	Hannah	Television film (Hallmark Channel)
2017	Ten Days in the Valley	Detective Nickole Bilson	Television series
2017	Hard Days, Wet Nights	Kyla	Television series
2017	My Little Pony: Equestria Girls	Juniper Montage (voice)	Voice role; "Movie Magic" and "Mirror Magic"
2017	A Gift to Remember	Darcy Archer	Television film (Hallmark Channel)
2018	Cooking with Love	Kelly	Television film (Hallmark Channel)
2019	A Storybook Christmas	Celeste	Television film
2019	Cherished Memories: A Gift To Remember 2	Darcy Archer	Television film (Hallmark Channel)
2021–2026	Family Law	Maggie Roth	Recurring role seasons 1–2; guest seasons 3–4
2021–2022	One of Us Is Lying	Ann Prentiss	Recurring role
2022	Three Wise Men and a Baby	Fiona	Television film (Hallmark Channel)
2025	The Christmas Baby	Erin Spinelli	TV film

== Awards and nominations ==
Year	Association	Category	Work	Result	Refs
2012	Leo Awards	Best Supporting Performance by a Female in a Dramatic Series	Bomb Girls	Nominated	
2013	Leo Awards	Best Supporting Performance by a Female in a Dramatic Series	Bomb Girls	Won	
2015	Canadian Screen Awards	Best Performance by an Actress in a Featured Supporting Role in a Dramatic Program or Series	Bomb Girls: Facing the Enemy	Won	
2016	Leo Awards	Best Lead Performance by a Female in a Motion Picture	The Devout	Won	
