= Flat (gridiron football) =

Field area in gridiron football

The flat in gridiron football is the area of the field extending ten yards into the defensive backfield from the line of scrimmage and extending outside the hash marks to the out-of-bounds lines (a distance of about 15 yards).

Offenses will typically exploit the flat to neutralize a potent attack from the defensive line in the middle of the field or to manipulate a defense's strong pass coverage further downfield. For example, in flat route plays, quarterbacks pass the ball to a player (often a running back) in the flat in hopes that, while the pass has not gone downfield, the receiver (far from the middle of the field and not far downfield enough to worry about cornerbacks and safeties) will have a clear line for an after-the-catch run. If the quarterback hopes to throw further downfield, the running back in the flat is an outlet receiver. If the receiver is accompanied by blockers, the play is called a screen pass.

Defenses meanwhile will generally assign a linebacker "flat responsibility" to guard against such passes, but it is difficult to defend against because the offense will typically use the flat route in conjunction with an attack downfield (sometimes as a feint), necessitating a quick linebacker adjustment to make an early tackle on a faster running back after the pass.
