= Tampa 2 =

American football defensive scheme

The Tampa 2 is an American football defensive scheme popularized by (and thus named after) the Tampa Bay Buccaneers of the National Football League (NFL) in the mid-1990s–early 2000s. The Tampa 2 is typically employed out of a 4–3 defensive alignment, which consists of four linemen, three linebackers, two cornerbacks, and two safeties. The defense is similar to a Cover 2 defense, except the middle linebacker drops into a deep middle coverage for a Cover 3 when he reads a pass play.

The term rose to popularity due to the installation and effective execution of this defensive scheme by then-head coach Tony Dungy and defensive coordinator Monte Kiffin, and the style helped the Buccaneers win Super Bowl XXXVII.

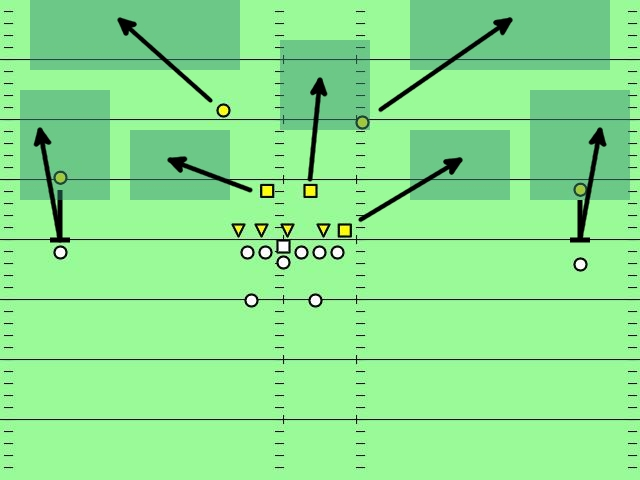
4–3 defense in a Tampa "Under" front, with back 7 falling into Tampa 2 zone coverage. Cornerbacks jam receivers before falling back into their zones. Middle linebacker ensures the deep middle is covered.

Despite being identified with Dungy and the Buccaneers, the roots of the Tampa 2 actually come from the Pittsburgh Steelers and their Steel Curtain defense of the 1970s. Dungy openly admitted that it was based on concepts he'd picked up in Pittsburgh, where he'd played as a safety from 1977 to 1978. "My philosophy is really out of the 1975 Pittsburgh Steelers playbook," said Dungy during media interviews while at Super Bowl XLI. "That is why I have to laugh when I hear 'Tampa 2'. Chuck Noll and Bud Carson—that is where it came from, I changed very little." Lovie Smith mentions having played the system in junior high school during the 1970s, though Carson introduced the idea of moving the middle linebacker into coverage. Carson's system became especially effective with the Steelers' addition of aggressive and athletic middle linebacker Jack Lambert.

After Dungy became head coach of the Indianapolis Colts and Smith (linebackers coach in Tampa from 1996 to 2000) became head coach of the Chicago Bears, they installed the Tampa 2 in their respective teams. During the 2005 NFL season, the Buccaneers, still under defensive coordinator Kiffin, ranked first in the league in fewest total yards allowed, Smith's Bears ranked number two, and Dungy's Colts ranked eleventh. By 2006, the Buffalo Bills, Minnesota Vikings, Kansas City Chiefs, and Detroit Lions had also adopted the defense. In college football, Gene Chizik is among the coaches that successfully implemented the Tampa 2.

The scheme is known for its simple format, speed, and the aggressive mentality of its players. Tampa 2 teams are known as gang tacklers with tremendous team speed, and practice to always run to the ball. It also requires a hard hitting secondary to cause turnovers.

== Description ==
Typically, the [Tampa 2] players don't have the prototypical size of other NFL defenders. Instead, stress is put on speed, smarts and flawless tackling. [...] A quick defensive line is a must, but the middle linebacker position is the straw that stirs the drink.

— Bryan Mullen, The Tennessean

The personnel used in the Tampa 2 are specific in position and required abilities. All positions in this defense place a premium on speed, and often the result is that they are all undersized by league standards. The defensive linemen in this scheme have to be quick and agile enough to create pressure on the quarterback without the aid of a blitz from either the linebackers or the secondary, with the defensive tackle in the nose position having above-average tackling skills to help stop runs. Warren Sapp is often cited as the primary example of a defensive lineman who flourished in this scheme due to his devastating combination of size and speed; he is now considered the prototypical three-technique defensive tackle.

The three linebackers, two cornerbacks and two safeties are responsible for covering the middle of the field. The outside linebackers' general zone is between the cornerbacks, covering the area of the field from the line of scrimmage to 10 yards back. The middle linebacker must have better-than-average speed, and additional skills to be able to read the play and either maintain his central position to help the outside linebackers cover short passes, drop behind the linebackers in coverage and protect the zone of the field behind the outside linebackers from 11 to 20 yards out, or run up to the line of scrimmage to help assist in stopping the runs. "It takes a special linebacker to do that, a guy with speed," wrote Pete Prisco, senior NFL writer for CBSSports.com. The cornerbacks protect the sidelines of the field from the line of scrimmage to anywhere between 15 and 20 yards out. According to Prisco, they "don't have to be great man-to-man cover players, but they have to be guys who can tackle". Dungy always expected his linebackers and cornerbacks to be above-average tacklers, since they are usually the primary tacklers in the defense.

The two safeties are responsible for covering their respective halves of the field from 20 yards out and more. The safeties in the system are expected to be above-average cover men with the ability to break up passes, but each safety also is expected to have additional specific skills. The strong safeties, while not expected to be great tacklers, are expected to be hard hitters. The hard hitting strong safety protects the middle of the field from being exploited by small, fast receivers, and running backs on wheel route. The free safety will be called upon to do one of two things in certain situations: either blitz the quarterback, requiring him to have the skills necessary to beat a blocking halfback or fullback, or to assume the coverage zone left by a blitzing cornerback.

The Tampa 2 is particularly effective against teams who are playing from behind, because it limits big plays. It forces offenses to be patient and to settle for short gains and time-consuming drives. This may be due to the nature of the "bend-but-don't-break" 2-deep zone coverage scheme and responsibilities safeties play in the Tampa 2.

When executed properly, the Tampa 2 defense is difficult to beat, a reason for its longevity, having seen no fundamental changes since first introduced in 1996. Teams that have been successful against this defense have managed to run the ball up the middle past the defensive tackles, or throw passes in the seams between the outside linebackers and the cornerbacks (often the most effective receiver against a Tampa 2 defense is a tight end, since they often line up against this seam).

Other tactics that have shown to be effective on occasion are misdirection plays that take advantage of the defensive speed and rely on the defense 'over-running' the play (such as the middle linebacker rushing to the line of scrimmage on a play-action pass), or overloading the safeties by having multiple receivers running deep routes, creating more targets in a zone than defenders. Recently, some teams have also been able to exploit the seam between the cornerbacks and the safeties, when the quarterback can throw a pass to a receiver in that seam faster than the safety can rush up to close it and cover the receiver. A recent trend is for teams to send a receiver up the middle, creating a mismatch against the linebacker in coverage. The popularity of the Tampa 2 means that offenses are now finding it effective to exploit the deep middle, where the safeties have to cover the most ground.

== Run defense ==
To defend running plays, the Tampa 2 is a single gap defense where each player is responsible for covering his own gap. The assigned gap changes with game conditions and personnel.

Typically this style of defense utilizes smaller but faster linemen and linebackers with above average speed. Also, the defensive backs must be above average hitters.

The key theme in stopping the run is directing traffic to the weak-side linebacker. It is therefore necessary to have a skilled tackler at the WLB position (e.g., Derrick Brooks, Lance Briggs, Sean Lee, Shaquille Leonard).
