= Fly pattern =

Fly pattern may refer to:

- Fly, a route in gridiron football
- Artificial fly, a type of fishing lure
