= All Pro Dad =

Fatherhood program of Family First

- Type: non-profit
- Founded: 1997
- Headquarters: Tampa, Florida U.S.
- Key people: Mark Merrill; (President & Founder); Tony Dungy; (National Spokesperson)
- Website: allprodad.com

All Pro Dad is the fatherhood program of Family First, a national non-profit organization based in Tampa, Florida. The program was launched in 1997 by Family First President Mark Merrill and Tony Dungy, former head coach of the 2006 Super Bowl champion Indianapolis Colts. The mission of All Pro Dad is to help dads love and lead their families well.

== All Pro Dad Resources ==
=== Play of the Day Email ===
The All Pro Dad Play of the Day, is a daily email sent to more than 200,000 subscribers. Each message offers parenting advice, encouragement, and tips to help fathers be more intentional in their relationships with their children.

=== Website Articles ===
The All Pro Dad website hosts thousands of articles on topics such as parenting, marriage, communication, discipline, and character development.

=== All Pro Dad Chapters ===
All Pro Dad Chapters, formerly known as All Pro Dad's Day, is a school based initiative designed to provide opportunities for dads to spend consistent, quality time with their children. Meetings are held monthly, typically before the school day begins, and involve guided conversations around parenting and character-building topics. As of April 15, 2025, there are more than 1,400 Chapters in 42 states, located in both public and private schools across the country.

=== All Pro Dad Experience ===
Since 2004, the All Pro Dad Experience has been held over 125 times in more than 30 different NFL, MLB, and NCAA markets. The All Pro Dad Experience is held at the team’s practice facility or stadium. These events take place at stadiums or practice facilities of NFL, MLB, and NCAA teams. During the three-hour event, fathers and their children participate in interactive activities, hear from guest speakers, and engage in conversations designed to strengthen their relationship. Speakers at past events have included Tony Dungy, Dabo Swinney, and Kirk Cousins.

=== All Pro Dad Podcast ===
The All Pro Dad Podcast launched in January 2024 with one clear mission: to help dads navigate their toughest parenting challenges. Hosted by members of the All Pro Dad team—including Ted Lowe, Bobby Lewis, and BJ Foster—the podcast addresses common parenting challenges and offers practical guidance. New episodes are released weekly and are available on major podcast platforms such as Apple Podcasts, Spotify, and YouTube.

=== Weekend Zone ===
The Weekend Zone is a weekly text message that provides dads with simple, practical suggestions for connecting with their kids over the weekend.

== All Pro Dad Ambassadors and Spokesmen ==
All Pro Dad partners with various NFL and NCAA Football players, coaches, and alumni to help reach dads. Here is a current list of All Pro Dad Ambassadors:

- Tony Dungy
- Ran Carthon
- Clyde Christensen
- Kirk Cousins
- Brian Dawkins
- Colt McCoy
- Billy Napier
- Dan Orlovsky
- Doug Pederson
- Matt Schaub
- Ryan Succop
- Dabo Swinney
- Troy Vincent
- Charlie Ward
- Benjamin Watson
- Justin Watson
