= Route (gridiron football) =

Pattern or path run by receivers in American football

A route tree for a receiver on the left side of the offense

A route is a pattern or path that a receiver in gridiron football runs to get open for a forward pass. Routes are usually run by wide receivers, running backs and tight ends, but other positions can act as a receiver given the play.

One popular way to organize routes is with a "route tree". A route tree is a way to show all the various routes with one diagram.

== Routes ==
A curl (hook) route

=== Curl ===
A curl route, also called a hitch or hook (sometimes a button hook), is a route where the receiver appears to be running a fly pattern but after a set number of steps or yards will quickly stop and turn around, looking for a pass. This generally works best when the defending corner or safety commits himself to guarding the fly and is unable to stop quickly enough to defend the pass. A "curl out" on the sideline is often referred to as a comeback route.

The curl is a pattern used frequently by the West Coast offensive scheme, where quick and accurate passes are favored.

This route can also be used in what is called a screen, where while the receiver is receiving the pass, one or more linemen, tight ends, or running backs will run in the direction of the receiver in order to block the initial pursuing defenders so that the receiver has time and space to be able to run after the catch.

=== Drag ===
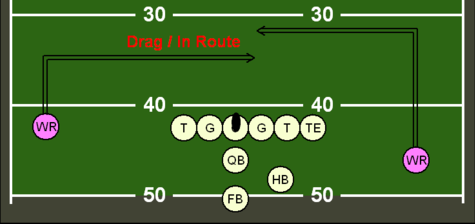
A drag (in) route

A drag route (also known as an in route or a dig route) is a route run by a receiver, where the receiver runs a few yards downfield, then turns 90° towards the center of the field and runs parallel to the line of scrimmage. This type of route is relatively safe and is thrown to an agile receiver who can make a play after the catch. Alternatively, a drag route may be used as a second option if the principal receiver on a play is covered.

The use of two crossing drag routes can also be used to try to create an open receiver by using the other receiver to block the path of a defensive back in a man coverage scheme. Out and in routes are the most difficult routes to cover in man-to-man coverage, but can be dangerous plays to run because, if the defender intercepts the pass, he will often have a clear path to the end zone.

=== Slant ===
The slant route is similar to the drag in that the wide receiver runs some three steps upfield, turns and runs at a 45° angle towards the center of the field. It's one of the most common routes of the game, often part of "quick game" situations. It's also a route quite hard for defensive backs to cover, which offers the offense chances for a big play.

=== Corner ===
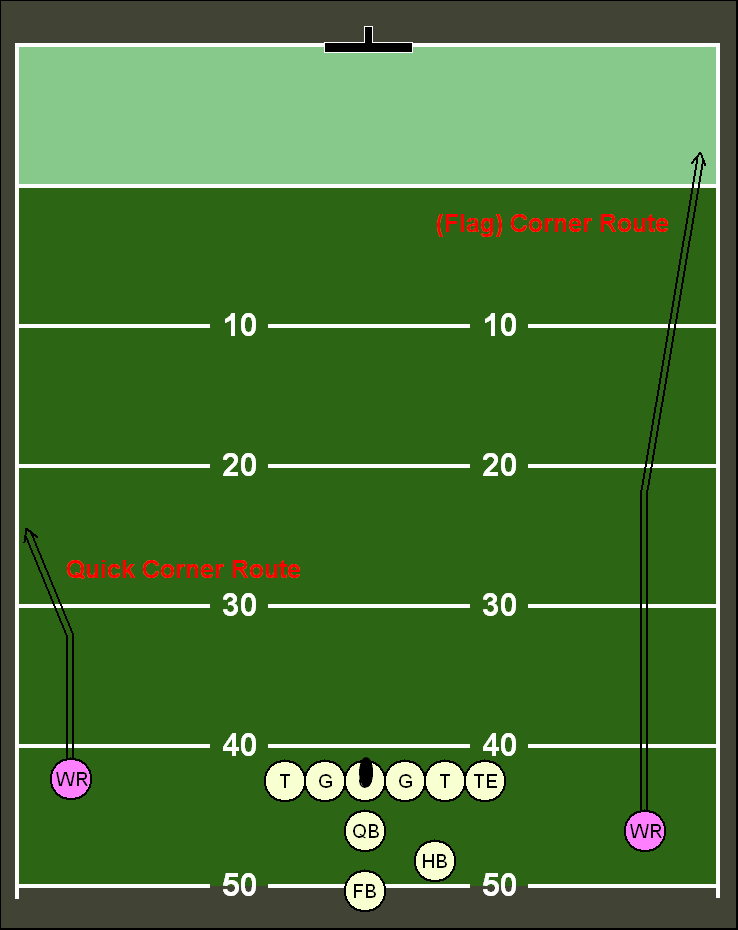
A corner (flag) route

A corner route is a pattern run by a receiver, where the receiver runs up the field and then turns at approximately a 45-degree angle, heading away from the quarterback towards the sideline. Usually, the pass is used when the defensive back is playing towards the inside shoulder of the receiver, thus creating a one on one vertical matchup. The corner route is less likely to be intercepted when compared to the slant route, because it is thrown away from the middle of the field. The pass is used frequently in the West Coast offensive scheme, where quick, accurate throwing is key. The pass may also be used closer to the goal line in what is called a "fade". The quarterback will lob the ball over a beaten defender to a wide receiver at the back corner of the end zone.

=== Fly ===
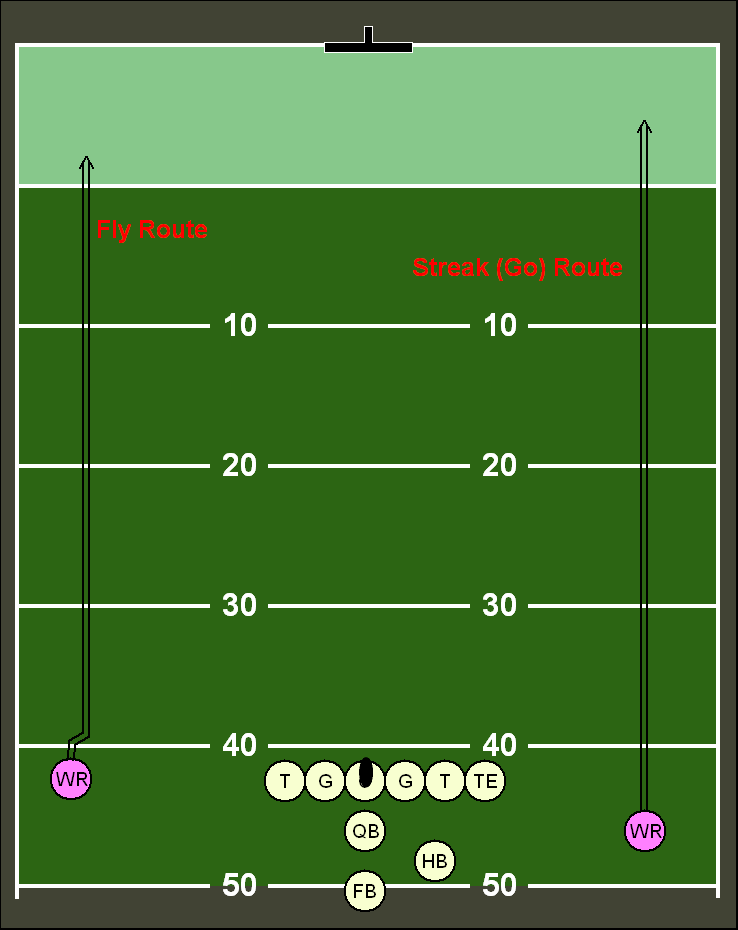
A fly (streak) route

A fly route, also called a streak route or go route, is a pattern run where the receiver runs straight upfield towards the endzone. The goal of the pattern is to outrun any defensive backs and get behind them, catching an undefended pass while running untouched for a touchdown. Generally, the fastest receiver on the team or any receiver faster than the man covering him would be the one to run these routes. When run down the sidelines, a fly can be called a fade route.

Fly patterns can also be used to clear out space for other receivers. Generally, a fly pattern will draw the attention of both the cornerback assigned to the receiver as well as "over the top" help from a safety. This can create a large gap in coverage, allowing another receiver to run a shorter route, but then gain many yards after the catch because the safety committed to the deep receiver.

The famed "Hail Mary" play generally involves between three and five receivers all running fly routes in order to have the most chance of one of them catching the ball and scoring or at least gaining significant yardage.

=== Out ===
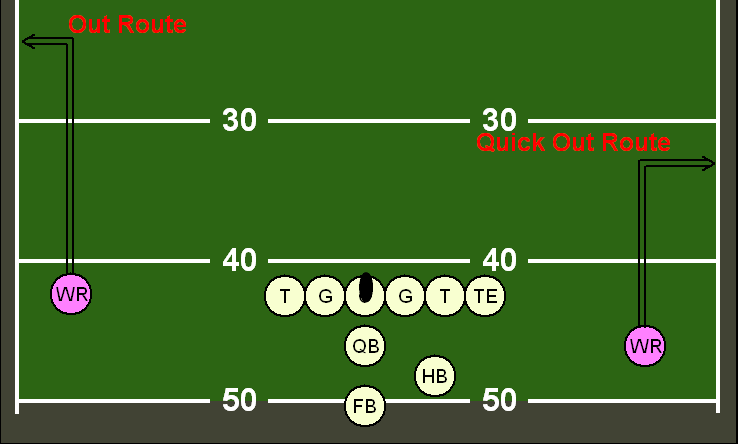
An out route

An out route (or down and out or jet route) is a pattern run by a receiver. On an out route, the receiver will start running a fly pattern (i.e., running straight down the field toward the end zone) but, after a certain number of steps, will cut hard 90 degrees "to the outside", or toward the sideline, away from the quarterback. If the cut comes very quickly, usually after only a few steps, it is called a "quick out". Out routes generally allow a one-on-one match-up between the receiver and the defensive back who is guarding him, as safeties generally are concerned with helping out on long routes downfield or the center of the field.

This route is used much more frequently near the end of each half, or when a team is running their two-minute drill to preserve time on the clock, because, as soon as the receiver catches the ball or after a short run after the catch, he should be able to get out of bounds, stopping the clock. It is a quick execution play; if the ball is thrown correctly usually a defensive player can't respond quickly enough to interfere. It is also often called in a 3rd-down situation where the full ten yards are needed. Out and in routes are the most difficult routes to cover in man-to-man coverage, but can be dangerous plays to run because, if the defender intercepts the pass, he will often have a clear path to the end zone.

=== Post ===
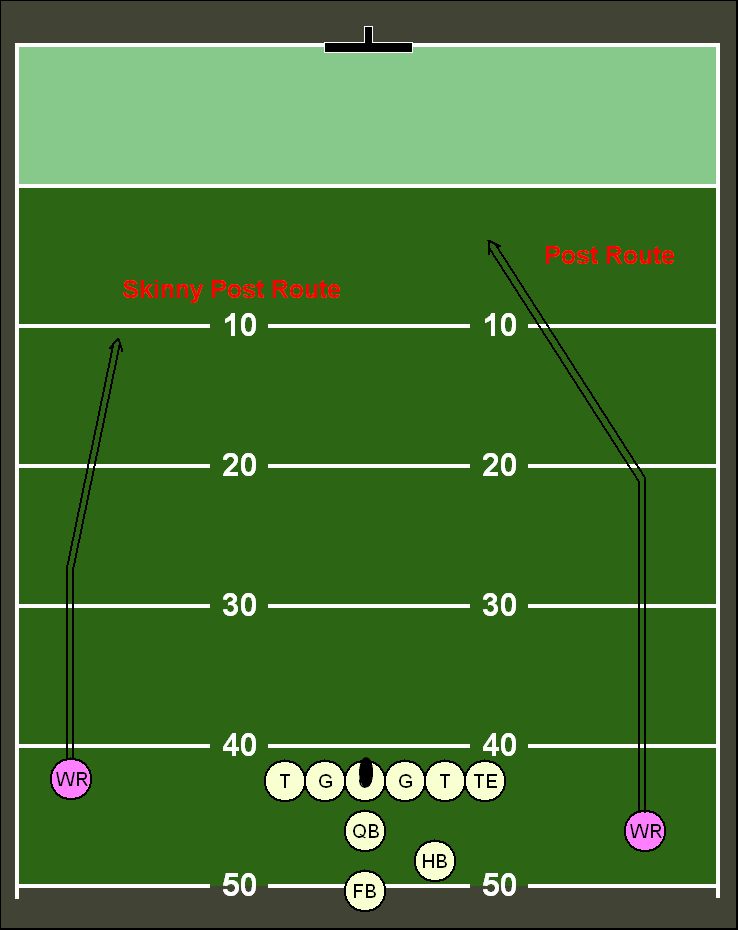
A post route

A post route is a moderate to deep passing route in which a receiver runs 10–20 yards from the line of scrimmage straight down the field, then cuts toward the middle of the field (towards the facing goalposts, hence the name) at a 45-degree angle.

It is designed to stretch the opposing secondary deep down the field, opening holes in the coverage over the middle. It works particularly well against secondaries that don't have more than one safety who is effective in coverage, or against safeties with 2 or 4 deep zone players, attacking the void in the middle of the field. It tends to induce the opposing defense to play a deeper field and drop more defenders into deep coverage, but this may still open up the run. Cover 3 packages can be effective against it, if the defender in middle deep coverage is perceptive enough.

To run the route effectively, a wide receiver must be adept at catching the ball in traffic, and have the vertical ability and strength to rise above the top of a safety to catch the ball.

A variant of the post pattern, in which the receiver cuts infield at a shallower angle, is called a skinny post. It is designed to find a hole in deep coverage, cutting shallow inside the deep sideline defender, but not far enough to draw the middle defender.

=== Flat ===
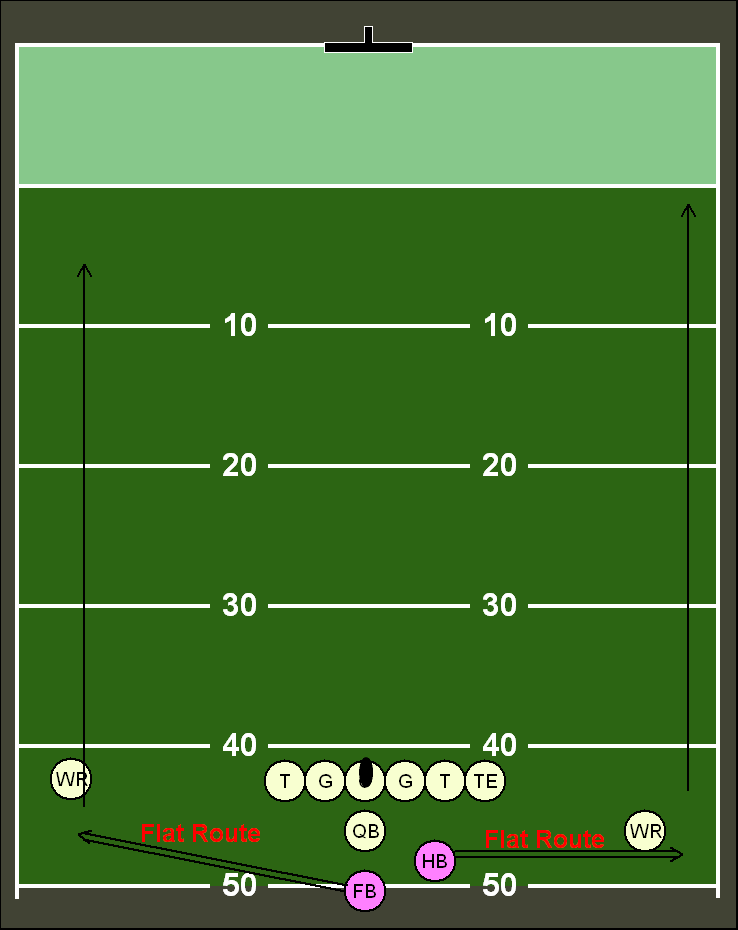
A flat route

A flat route is usually run by a running back or a fullback. When run by a receiver it can be known as a speed out or arrow route. The eligible receiver runs parallel to the line of scrimmage till near the sidelines (in the flat) and turns toward the quarterback to wait for the pass. The QB's pass should arrive when the receiver has not yet passed the line of scrimmage. The receiver will then turn upfield at the sideline and run straight down the field.

The route is used with long post, long corner or fly routes, so the safeties and the cornerbacks should be upfield when the pass is caught by the RB or FB. There should be a linebacker covering the RB/FB on these kinds of plays, which is likely to be an easy match for an elusive runner like the running back.

=== Wheel ===
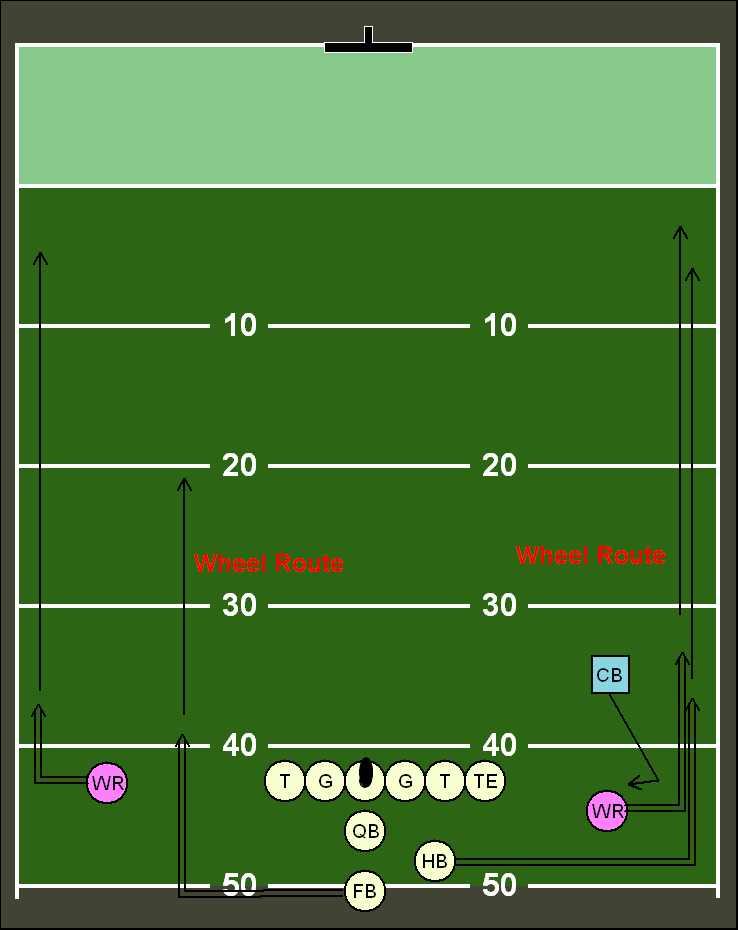
A diagram of wheel routes run from a number of different positions.

A wheel route can be run by a receiver or running back in American football. If a receiver runs it, they will immediately run a quick out pattern, then proceed to turn upfield in a curved pattern. Typically this route is run by an inside receiver, with the number one receiver heading inside to exploit coverage in the defense. When run from the running back position the player will run towards the sideline while looking back at the quarterback as if about to receive a pass on a flare route. The running back will then turn upfield at the sideline and run straight down the field.

This route is useful when run from the wide receiver position because the defensive back will expect the ball to be thrown as the receiver makes his first turn and will bite (go for the fake) underneath the receiver (run between the quarterback and the receiver to try to prevent, block, or intercept the pass) to defend the pass and be unable to recover as the receiver turns upfield. In this respect the route is very similar to an Out-and-Up or chair route, but without the vertical release that the Out-and-Up utilizes. The route is useful when run from the running back position because the defender will assume the ball is going to be thrown to the running back behind the line of scrimmage (the quarterback can use a pump fake to further "sell" this), and will bite underneath the running back only to have the running back turn upfield.

=== Swing ===
The swing route is run by the running back, and is like a triangle route thrown before the turn up the sideline, i. e. release toward the sideline, and then bend or arc upfield ever so slightly, and look for a short pass. It can be combined with a screen pass. It is distinguished from a flat route by approaching the line of scrimmage more gradually, on a curved path.

=== Seam ===
The seam route is a route, usually played against a zone defense in American football, in which the receiver runs at the edges of a defender's coverage (for example, between the linebacker and safety), thus, on the "Seam" between two or more coverages. It is not a route on its own, but the location of another route (typically fly route or post route). The Seam is the area where two defenders' areas of responsibility meet. The concept behind this is that the ability to complete a pass is increased because the defenders may be confused about which one of them is responsible for defending the player on the Seam or; the defenders are trying to cover their area of responsibility which creates an open space equidistant between the defenders.

=== Stop-and-go ===
A stop-and-go, pump-and-go or a hitch-and-go is a route run by a receiver. It is a combination of a fake curl (or hitch) followed by a go (or fly route).

=== Jerk ===
A jerk route is run by a receiver. In essence, it is a shallow crossing route with a stutter step. The idea is to isolate the receiver on a linebacker. One stops as if he is receiving a pass on a curl or going to retrace his steps, then he has the option to continue across the field, or change direction at an angle.

=== Double out ===
A double out is when a receiver runs 5-8 yards down field cuts outside, then cuts vertically upfield once more then cuts outside again. This route is very difficult to run and to defend due to all of the drastic changes in momentum, this route is also rarely used due to the time taken to correctly complete.

=== Angle route ===
Typically run by a running back, fullback, or tight end, the player will run out at a 45-degree angle for a few steps, then cut 90 degrees back inside.

=== Sail route ===
A "sail" route scheme designed to overload the defense on the right side of the field.

The sail route is not a route, but a combination of routes. The sail concept is a three-level passing scheme that overloads one side of the defense while stretching the coverage vertically. Typically, the sail concept is a combination of a deep vertical route from the outside receiver, an intermediate out or crossing route from the inside receiver, and a short flat route ‒ often a quick out or a swing route ‒ by the running back. This sets up a three-level read for the quarterback, with a receiver at 25-, 15- and 5- yard depths vertically.

=== Pivot ===
A pivot route, also known as a shark route or a zig route, is similar to an out route, except the receiver will cut one direction, then spin 180 degrees towards the line of scrimmage then continue in the opposite direction.

=== Sluggo ===
A sluggo is run by a receiver. The word was coined by Bill Walsh as an apparent compression of "slant and go".

=== Hot route ===
A hot route is used to escape a potential sack from a blitzing defense. A hot route is a variation on the regular running route for a running back. It results usually from an audible called by a quarterback, and is based on a read of a blitzing defense. If the defense does not blitz, the running back runs the regular route. If the defense does blitz, the running back will, instead of blocking the blitzing defensive player, run a short route, such as a bubble screen, and catch the ball which the quarterback dumps off quickly.

=== Crossing ===
A crossing route or crossing pattern refers to either a drag or slant route where a receiver crosses across the field.

=== Chair ===
The chair route or out-and-up was pioneered by Don Hutson. It is an out route followed by a fly route, like a wheel route with a quicker vertical release; or a stop-and-go with an out rather than a curl.
