= Tony Dungy =

American football player and coach (born 1955)

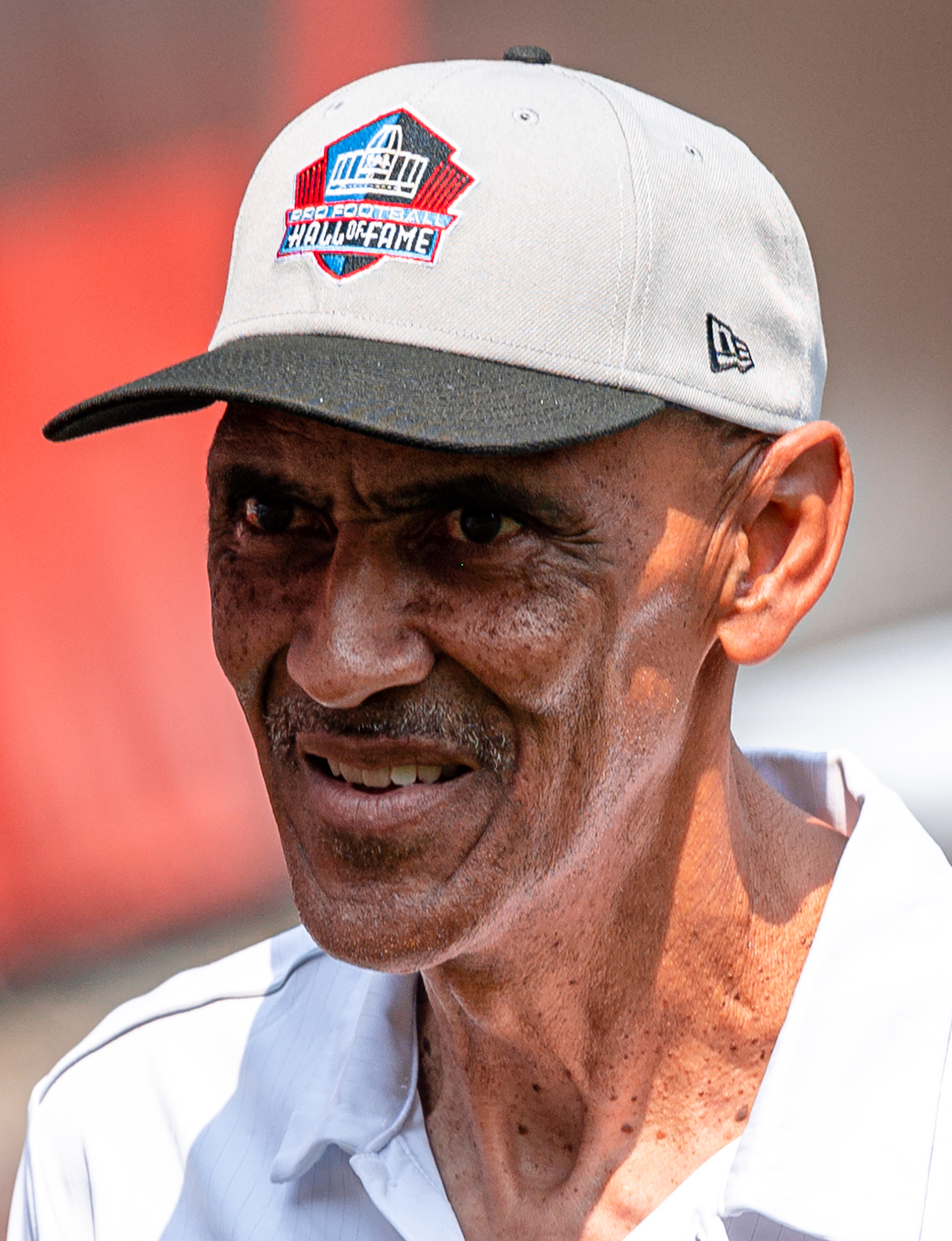
- Dungy in 2021

No. 21, 27
- Position: Safety

Personal information
- Born: October 6, 1955 (age 71); Jackson, Michigan, U.S.
- Listed height: 6 ft 0 in (1.83 m)
- Listed weight: 188 lb (85 kg)

Career information
- High school: Parkside (Jackson)
- College: Minnesota (1973–1976)
- NFL draft: 1977: undrafted

Career history

Playing
- Pittsburgh Steelers (1977–1978); San Francisco 49ers (1979); New York Giants (1980)*
- * Offseason or practice squad member only

Coaching
- Minnesota (1980) Defensive backs coach; Pittsburgh Steelers (1981–1983) Defensive backs coach; Pittsburgh Steelers (1984–1988) Defensive coordinator; Kansas City Chiefs (1989–1991) Defensive backs coach; Minnesota Vikings (1992–1995) Defensive coordinator; Tampa Bay Buccaneers (1996–2001) Head coach; Indianapolis Colts (2002–2008) Head coach

Awards and highlights
- As player: Super Bowl champion (XIII); 2× Second-team All-Big Ten (1975, 1976); As coach: Super Bowl champion (XLI); 2× Greasy Neale Award (1997, 2005); George Halas Award (2006); Lamar Hunt Award (2009); NFL 2000s All-Decade Team; Indianapolis Colts Ring of Honor (2010); Tampa Bay Buccaneers Ring of Honor (2018)

Career NFL statistics
- Interceptions: 9
- Interception yards: 132
- Fumble recoveries: 6
- Stats at Pro Football Reference

Head coaching record
- Regular season: 139–69 (.668)
- Postseason: 9–10 (.474)
- Career: 148–79 (.652)
- Coaching profile at Pro Football Reference
- Pro Football Hall of Fame

Anthony Kevin Dungy (/ˈdʌndʒi/ DUN-jee; born October 6, 1955) is an American former professional football safety and coach who served as a head coach in the National Football League (NFL) for 13 seasons with the Tampa Bay Buccaneers and Indianapolis Colts. His teams became perennial postseason contenders under his leadership, missing the playoffs only twice with Tampa Bay. He led the Colts to victory in Super Bowl XLI, making him the first African American head coach to win the Super Bowl.

Dungy began his head coaching tenure in 1996 with the Buccaneers, a franchise regarded as one of the league's worst. Through implementation of the Tampa 2 defensive scheme, he brought new success to the Buccaneers, leading them to four playoff appearances in six seasons. He was fired after the 2001 playoffs due to frequent postseason struggles, but is credited with constructing the team that won Super Bowl XXXVII the following year. After his departure from Tampa Bay, he served as the Colts' head coach for seven seasons, qualifying for the playoffs in each. His greatest success occurred with the Colts' Super Bowl-winning season in 2006, the franchise's first in over three decades and the first since relocating to Indianapolis. He retired from coaching following the 2008 season.

Since retiring, Dungy has served as an analyst on NBC's Football Night in America. He is also the national spokesman for the fatherhood program All Pro Dad. He was inducted into the Pro Football Hall of Fame in 2016.

== Early life ==
Born and raised in Jackson, Michigan, Dungy's parents were Wilbur Dungy (1926–2004), a science professor at Jackson College and Delta College (MI), and Cleomae Dungy (1920–2002), who taught Shakespeare at Jackson High School. Wilbur served as a pilot in the Army Air Forces during World War II with the famed Tuskegee Airmen. After graduating from Parkside High School in 1973, Dungy played college football at the University of Minnesota, and was the Gophers' quarterback and most valuable player in 1975 and 1976. In 1977, he was awarded the Big Ten Medal of Honor, recognizing one student athlete from the graduating class of each Big Ten member school, for demonstrating joint athletic and academic excellence throughout their college career.

== Professional career ==
After going undrafted, Dungy signed with the Pittsburgh Steelers as a free agent and was converted to defensive back, going on to play three seasons in the NFL. His best season was in 1978, when he intercepted six passes and won a championship ring with the Steelers in Super Bowl XIII.

Dungy is the most recent NFL player to intercept a pass and throw an interception in the same game. Dungy was the emergency quarterback for the Pittsburgh Steelers in a 1977 game against the Houston Oilers when both Terry Bradshaw and Mike Kruczek went down with injuries on October 9.

== Coaching career ==
=== Assistant coaching positions ===
After being cut by the New York Giants in training camp before the 1980 season, Dungy returned to Minnesota as defensive backfield coach. He took the same position with the Steelers in 1982, and was promoted in 1984 to defensive coordinator. Following a 5–11 season in 1988, Steelers owner Dan Rooney forced head coach Chuck Noll to make changes to his coaching staff, which included demoting Dungy back to defensive backs coach. From 1989 to 1991, Dungy served as defensive backs coach for the Kansas City Chiefs, under head coach Marty Schottenheimer. From 1992 to 1995, he served as the defensive coordinator for the Minnesota Vikings under head coach Dennis Green.

=== Tampa Bay Buccaneers ===
Dungy became an NFL head coach when he was hired by Rich McKay to reform the Tampa Bay Buccaneers, a team then well known for its lack of success, on January 22, 1996. Dungy installed his version of the Cover 2 defense with defensive coordinator Monte Kiffin with a few new wrinkles. The result was the now-famous Tampa 2, though Dungy openly admitted it was based on concepts he had picked up from his days in Pittsburgh.

Following the 2002 season, the Buccaneers won Super Bowl XXXVII, their first appearance in the championship game. Dungy was fired after the prior season and replaced with Jon Gruden because he could not get the team there, but is now credited with developing the team’s championship-caliber foundation.

Dungy's 56 victories were the most in Buccaneers history until 2008 when Jon Gruden surpassed him with his 57th win.

=== Indianapolis Colts ===
On January 22, 2002, Dungy was hired as head coach of the Indianapolis Colts, a team that at the time was potent offensively but weak defensively. He installed his "Tampa 2" defense immediately and continued to retool the Colts' defense to his liking during his tenure. After joining the Colts, Dungy left the high-powered offense previously installed there by Jim Mora, in both playing style and in personnel, virtually unchanged. Dungy was reunited with Tom Moore, who was retained as offensive coordinator. Moore and Dungy had previously worked together at Minnesota and Pittsburgh.

During his early tenure in Indianapolis, Dungy struggled to fix the Colts' defense and had mixed results in the postseason. In his first season at Indianapolis, the Colts were shut out 41–0 by the New York Jets in a first-round playoff game, and the team lost postseason games to the New England Patriots in both 2003 (in the AFC championship game) and 2004 (in the second round of the playoffs). Dungy signed a three-year contract extension in October 2005 for US$5 million per year.

The Colts' 2006 playoff run was characterized by a marked improvement in defensive play, as the Colts defeated the Kansas City Chiefs, holding one of the NFL's best running backs to less than 50 yards, and beat the Baltimore Ravens in the divisional round. On January 21, 2007, after trailing 21–3, the Colts defeated the New England Patriots to become AFC champions and advanced to Super Bowl XLI. This was the largest comeback in conference title-game history. Dungy coached the Colts to a 29–17 victory over the Chicago Bears in Super Bowl XLI. Dungy became the first African-American head coach to win a Super Bowl. Dungy would coach two more seasons in Indianapolis, retiring after the 2008 season.

=== Coaching firsts ===
Dungy's career has included several notable firsts. Among them, Dungy is the first NFL head coach to defeat all 32 NFL teams. He was also the youngest assistant coach at age 25 and the youngest coordinator at age 28 in NFL history.

=== Coaching strategy ===
On offense, Tony Dungy's strategy involved a conservative, ball-control offense based primarily around running the ball and short, high-percentage passes when he was at Tampa Bay. At Indianapolis, he inherited and kept the offense designed by offensive coordinator Tom Moore because the offense was in the hands of someone he knew and trusted.

On defense, Dungy used a stifling "Cover 2"-style zone defense, which usually was based around a formation of four linemen, three linebackers, and four defensive backs. The "Cover 2" defense Dungy used involved his linemen rushing the passer, the cornerbacks covering the passing flat area, the linebackers covering the middle of the field, and the safeties providing deep coverage on each half of their respective zones. While the Cover 2 defense was not a new concept, Dungy contributed to its greater use by systemizing it into an every-down defense. The personnel and techniques that Dungy used in this defense were very specific, and as a result, his style of defense earned the moniker of the "Tampa 2" around the NFL.

Dungy is mentioned in the book Power of Habit, by Charles Duhigg, in chapter 3: "The Golden Rule of Habit Change."

=== Coaching philosophy ===
Dungy stresses that coaches are essentially teachers.

His protege, Lovie Smith, observed, "We talked about how to do it, being a teacher instead of screaming and yelling, all that stuff... I think as you look to young coaches coming up in the ranks, a lot of us have a picture of how a coach is supposed to be, how he is supposed to act. And I think what Tony Dungy showed me is you don't have to act that way."

Dungy said:

I really wanted to show people you can win all kinds of ways. I always coached the way I've wanted to be coached. I know Lovie has done the same thing. For guys to have success where it maybe goes against the grain, against the culture. I know I probably didn't get a couple of jobs in my career because people could not see my personality or the way I was going to do it. For your faith to be more important than your job, for your family to be more important than that job. We all know that's the way it should be, but we're afraid to say that sometimes. Lovie's not afraid to say it and I'm not afraid to say it.

Dungy also learned from Noll that it takes all 53 of the players on the team to win so that a coach should train the 53rd player on the roster as he would the third player, which has become the spine of Dungy's own coaching philosophy, the Next Man Up theory of calm coaching. Dungy stressed that a team should have a thought process, a philosophy, and the conviction to stick with it, even if personnel change during the games because of injuries. Dungy said:

Chuck's philosophy was to convince every guy on the team that his role was important. If you came in as a free agent and were just a gunner on the punt team or the third safety, you were doing something the team needed to win. It was his way of emphasizing that no one is irreplaceable. You have to coach everybody the same way. If Joe Greene goes out, Steve Furness goes in and we're not going to change anything. Chuck never panicked when someone got hurt or held out. We can still function. That made a big impression on me.

Dungy put his coaching beliefs on his memoir, Quiet Strength: The Principles, Practices, and Priorities of a Winning Life (ISBN 1-414-31801-4). Cam Cameron, former head coach of the Miami Dolphins, highly recommended the book by buying 1,000 books to give away to football coaches at his preseason coaching clinic in July 2007 in South Florida, and said:

It dispelled so many myths about the coaching business – that you had to be a yeller and a screamer to win. You can be your own person, treat people with respect, be very demanding, but demanding in a way that doesn't trample on people. And you don't have to give up your faith to win in the NFL. It confirmed and reaffirmed an awful lot of the beliefs I held about coaching.

=== Instant replay opposition ===
Dungy opposes the use of replay review in the NFL. In 1997, after a failed vote by NFL owners to reinstate instant replay, Dungy said that he would have favored replay if it were applicable to all calls and if it were not associated with a team's timeouts. The Tampa Bay Times described Dungy as "vehemently opposed" to replay in 2003, after the league had resumed using it.

In 2002, Dungy acknowledged he made a mistake by not challenging one of Peyton Manning's interceptions, and he also criticized the league's handling of replay challenges. "We have plays where whistles are blown too fast, and I think we're getting to the point where we're letting coaches officiate the game," said Dungy, who said that it had become a trend for officials to expect coaches to challenge controversial calls.

Dungy has continued to criticize the NFL's replay system in his role as a broadcaster on NBC. In 2019, after a failed challenge by Green Bay Packers coach Matt LaFleur, who contended that the Philadelphia Eagles committed pass interference that was not called on the field, Dungy said on television that the replay system was not working as intended. Dungy posted on his Twitter account, "That's terrible. I don't understand this replay review of Pass Interference. That one on Philadelphia couldn't have been more clear cut. If they're not going to reverse that one I don't see how they can reverse any call."

== Head coaching record ==
Team	Year	Regular season					Postseason			
Team	Year	Won	Lost	Ties	Win %	Finish	Won	Lost	Win %	Result
TB	1996	6	10	0	.375	4th in NFC Central	–	–	–	–
TB	1997	10	6	0	.625	2nd in NFC Central	1	1	.500	Lost to Green Bay Packers in NFC Divisional Game
TB	1998	8	8	0	.500	3rd in NFC Central	–	–	–	–
TB	1999	11	5	0	.688	1st in NFC Central	1	1	.500	Lost to St. Louis Rams in NFC Championship Game
TB	2000	10	6	0	.625	2nd in NFC Central	0	1	.000	Lost to Philadelphia Eagles in NFC Wild Card game
TB	2001	9	7	0	.562	3rd in NFC Central	0	1	.000	Lost to Philadelphia Eagles in NFC Wild Card Game
TB total		54	42	0	.562		2	4	.333	
IND	2002	10	6	0	.625	2nd in AFC South	0	1	.000	Lost to New York Jets in AFC Wild Card Game
IND	2003	12	4	0	.750	1st in AFC South	2	1	.666	Lost to New England Patriots in AFC Championship Game
IND	2004	12	4	0	.750	1st in AFC South	1	1	.500	Lost to New England Patriots in AFC Divisional Game
IND	2005	14	2	0	.875	1st in AFC South	0	1	.000	Lost to Pittsburgh Steelers in AFC Divisional Game
IND	2006	12	4	0	.750	1st in AFC South	4	0	1.000	Super Bowl XLI champions
IND	2007	13	3	0	.813	1st in AFC South	0	1	.000	Lost to San Diego Chargers in AFC Divisional Game
IND	2008	12	4	0	.750	2nd in AFC South	0	1	.000	Lost to San Diego Chargers in AFC Wild Card Game
IND total		85	27	0	.759		7	6	.538	
Total		139	69	0	.668		9	10	.474	

== Awards and honors ==
As player:

- Super Bowl champion (XIII)
- 2× Second-team All-Big Ten (1975, 1976)

As coach:

- Super Bowl champion (XLI)
- 2× Greasy Neale Award (1997, 2005)
- George Halas Award (2006)
- Lamar Hunt Award (2009)
- NFL 2000s All-Decade Team
- Indianapolis Colts Ring of Honor (2010)
- Tampa Bay Buccaneers Ring of Honor (2018)
- Amos Alonzo Stagg Coaching Award by the United States Sports Academy (2007)
- Pro Football Hall of Fame (2016) – the first black head coach of the modern era, he is the second of all time to Fritz Pollard, to receive this honor. (Former Oakland Raiders player and head coach Art Shell was inducted into the Hall of Fame in 1989, but for his accomplishments as a player.)

== Broadcasting career ==
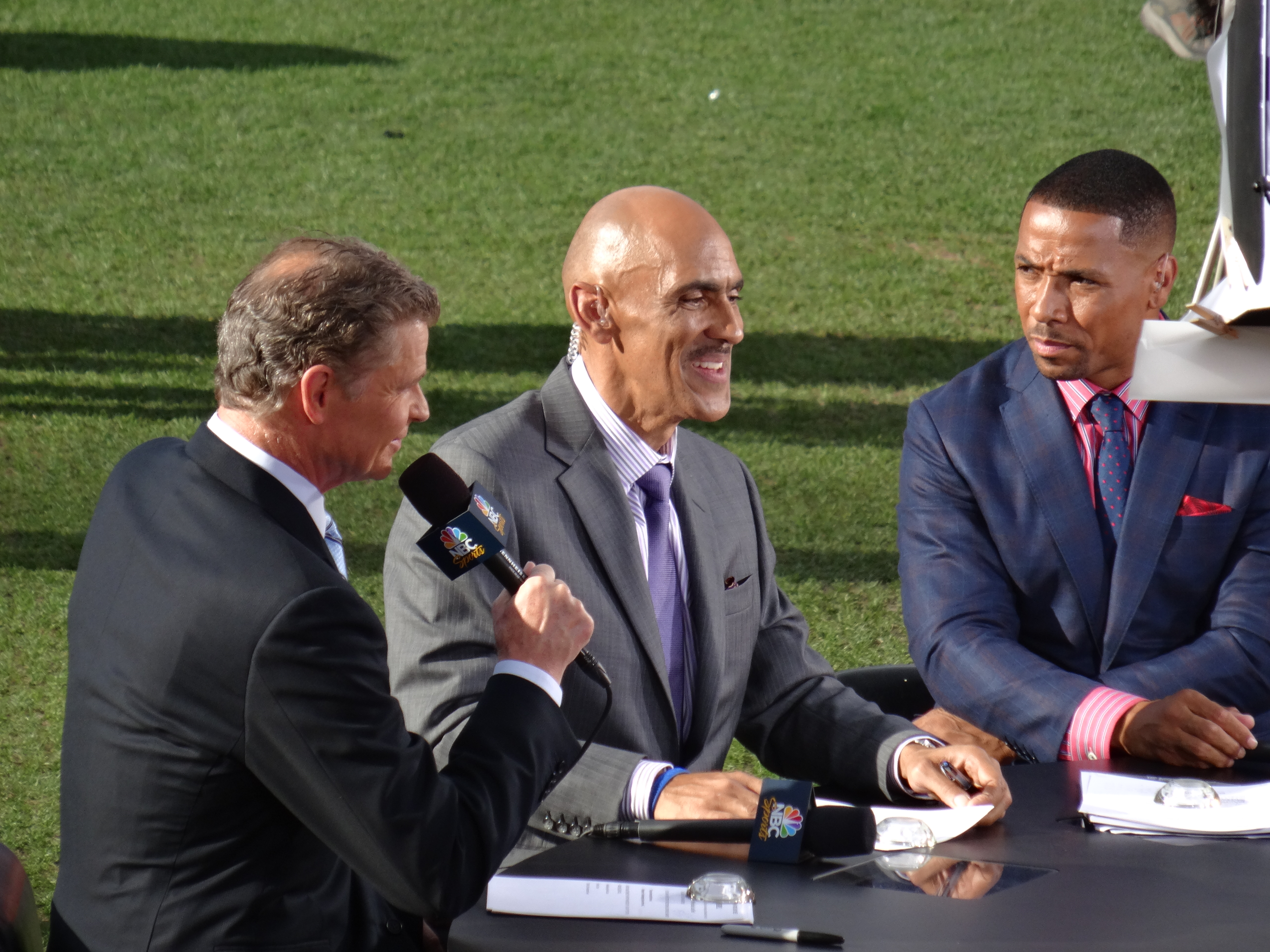
Dungy (center) along with colleagues Dan Patrick and Rodney Harrison at an NFL game in Denver in September 2013

NBC Sports hired Dungy in 2009 as a broadcast analyst for programming related to Sunday Night Football. Dungy was hired at the same time as Rodney Harrison, and the two have appeared with other analysts on Football Night in America, NBC's pregame show for SNF. In addition to his studio analyst duties, Dungy has joined Mike Tirico in the broadcast booth for live action of Thanksgiving Day games. He called the Jaguars–Chargers Wild Card playoff game in January 2023 with Al Michaels; the broadcast attracted criticism from fans who felt that Michaels and Dungy were not energetic enough. Michaels defended the broadcast, calling the criticism that he had read "Internet compost".

NBC Sports placed Dungy in the broadcast booth for the 2020 Notre Dame football season, replacing Doug Flutie.

In 2021, on an open media call, Dungy criticized the NFL's partnerships with seven sportsbooks, after a long period where the league opposed sports betting of any sort. "I don’t know why the NFL changed its stance. My objection is just personal. I don’t think we should encourage people who are watching the NFL to gamble. Especially young people," Dungy said.

== Civic involvement ==
In August 2007, President George W. Bush appointed Dungy a member of the President's Council on Service and Civic Participation. The 25-member council represents leaders from government, business, entertainment, athletics and non-profit organizations committed to growing the spirit of service and civic participation. The two-year appointment requires attendance at two in-person meetings per year and quarterly phone conversations with assigned committees. After receiving the call from President Bush, Dungy remarked "It was something that was really hard to believe. Certainly, when you go into football coaching, you’re not expecting to get presidential appointments to anything."

In March 2009, President Barack Obama invited Dungy to join the Advisory Council on Faith-Based and Neighborhood Partnerships. He declined the invitation to join the council because of scheduling conflicts, as he could make only two of 2009's four council meetings, but agreed to be an informal adviser on fatherhood issues.

He had also turned down offers from National Football League Players' Association to become liaison to the NFL.

== Personal life ==
Dungy is an evangelical Christian, and at one point in his coaching career considered leaving football for the prison ministry. Throughout his career, he has remained involved with community service organizations.

Dungy is married to Lauren Dungy. They have 11 children: 3 biological children and 8 adopted children. Their oldest son died by suicide at age 18, outside of Tampa in 2005.

Dungy's tenure in Tampa Bay as the head coach of the Buccaneers brought greater attention to his personal accomplishments outside of sports. He has been active in many community-service organizations in the cities in which he has coached. While in Tampa Bay, Dungy worked as a public speaker for the Fellowship of Christian Athletes and Athletes in Action.

He began a mentoring program for young people called Mentors for Life, and provided Buccaneers' tickets for the participants. He also supported other charitable programs in the area such as Big Brothers/Big Sisters, Boys and Girls Club, the Prison Crusade Ministry, foster parenting organizations, and Family First. He continues to assist Big Brothers/Big Sisters and the Boys and Girls Club in Indianapolis. He also supports the Black Coaches Association National Convention and Indiana Black Expo.

After Michael Sam, an openly gay player, was drafted by the St. Louis Rams in the 2014 NFL draft, Dungy said he would not have drafted Sam, saying, "Not because I don't believe Michael Sam should have a chance to play, but I wouldn't want to deal with all of it." The comment drew criticism from some who viewed it as homophobic. Following a backlash, Dungy clarified his remarks, saying that he gave an "honest answer" to a question and that his concern would be with media coverage over Sam if he had been the player's coach. Dungy has also expressed opposition to same-sex marriage. In 2023, Dungy shared, and later deleted and apologized for sharing, the litter boxes in schools hoax on his Twitter account. The act drew a rebuke from an NBC Sports spokesperson, and drew attention to past anti-LGBTQ statements by Dungy, but the network kept Dungy on his regularly scheduled broadcast assignments.

Dungy is opposed to abortion, and he served as a keynote speaker at the 2023 March for Life. Dungy opposed Florida Amendment 4, calling the amendment's language "deceptive".

On September 6, 2007, The Indianapolis Star reported that the Davie-Brown Index (DBI), an independent celebrity-rating service for advertisers, placed Dungy in the top 15 of the 900 actors, musicians, TV personalities, and sports celebrities it ranks for overall appeal, putting him on a level with actors such as Tom Hanks and Morgan Freeman. Among sports figures, he ranks second to Hank Aaron.

On February 27, 2008, Indiana Wesleyan University honored Dungy in a ceremony where he was inducted into IWU's Society of World Changers. Dungy also received an honorary doctorate of humane letters from the university.

Since retirement, Dungy has become an informal mentor to the formerly suspended NFL player Michael Vick, counseling him during his incarceration, serving as his advocate in trying to get a team to have him on the roster (the Philadelphia Eagles later signed Vick to the team).

== Books ==
Dungy's memoir, Quiet Strength: The Principles, Practices, and Priorities of a Winning Life, was released on July 10, 2007 and reached No. 1 on the hardcover nonfiction section of the New York Times Best Seller list on August 5, 2007 and again on September 9, 2007. Tyndale House Publishers said it was the first NFL-related book ever ranked No. 1. When asked why he wrote Quiet Strength, Dungy said,

It's not something I ever really thought of doing. I've had several people ask me about it for a number of years. Several people asked about it after winning (the Super Bowl). I was hoping, really, not to do it... I think it becomes kind of what happens. You win a Super Bowl, you have a big achievement, and you write a book. And I didn't want to be one of those guys, but a lot of people thought that it was the right time – and it did turn out to be that. I think people were looking for something positive to read, and we had a lot of negative in the sports world. I think it just came out at the right time. Maybe the Lord's timing was good.

Dungy said he had actually gotten "more satisfaction" from the success of Quiet Strength than the Super Bowl win. That is because, he said, "I’ve gotten so many calls and letters from people saying they really got something out of it, something that helped them." On January 10, 2008, Quiet Strength reached 1 million copies in print. Quiet Strength was on the New York Times Best Seller List for 32 weeks, including 27 in the top 10 for hardcover nonfiction.

Dungy also published a 96-page paperback called Quiet Strength: Men's Bible Study on July 18, 2007. Dungy challenged men to answer six questions: What's my game plan? What's my strength? What's success? Where's my security? What's my significance? And, what's my legacy? The book is aimed specifically at men, including those who may not otherwise be interested in spiritual matters.

When asked if Dungy would consider writing a follow-up to Quiet Strength, Dungy said,

Three months ago, I would've said 'no' for sure. But the impact of this one has been beyond what I could've dreamed and there may be another one in the future. The focus would probably be on how to develop leadership and a coaching strategy for whatever business you're in; coaching for your family, business, or sport based on Christian principles.

Dungy published a 24-page children's picture book called You Can Do It with Little Simon Inspirations, a division of Simon & Schuster on July 8, 2008, reached number one on the children's picture books section of the New York Times best seller list on July 27, 2008 and stayed on the top 10 for 5 weeks. The book tells the story of Dungy's younger brother Linden who struggles, then figures out his life dream and is encouraged by his family to follow that dream as a dentist. Dungy said that his other hopes for You Can Do It were that it would encourage parents to read to their kids and that kids would learn the lesson of pursuing whatever field they were talented in, even if it might not be the popular thing to do.

Dungy has also published Uncommon: Finding Your Path to Significance, a book revealing lessons on achieving significance that Dungy has learned. The book, released on February 17, 2009, with Tyndale House Publishers, particularly focuses on what it means to be a man of significance in a culture that is offering young men few positive role models. Dungy said,

Our young men today are falling into a trap... Society is telling them material success is what's important, but if we buy into that idea, we can spend a lifetime chasing that success and never really have the positive impact on people that would make our lives truly significant.

Uncommon reached number two on the hardcover advice section of the New York Times best seller list and stayed on the top 10 for 9 weeks.

On August 3, 2010, Dungy released a new book entitled The Mentor Leader, which debuted at number two and stayed on the top 10 for 5 weeks on the hardcover advice section of the New York Times list.

On January 11, 2011, Dungy and wife Lauren released a new book entitled You Can Be a Friend. Their story teaches children what it means to be a good friend. The book debuted at number seven and stayed on the top 10 for 1 week on the children's picture books section of The New York Times best seller list.

On January 22, 2019, Dungy released a new book entitled The Soul of a Team. The book was co-written with Nathan Whitaker, and their story illustrates what separates the truly great teams from the mediocre ones. "Simply put, a team that has SOUL can and will accomplish far more than one that doesn’t.” Dungy writes.

== Endorsements ==
Dungy was on the cover of NFL Head Coach 09 as its "cover coach".

== See also ==
- List of National Football League head coach wins leaders

== Bibliography ==
- Dungy, Tony; Whitaker, Nathan (2007). Quiet Strength: the Principles, Practices, & Priorities of a Winning Life. Tyndale House. ISBN 978-1-4143-1801-1.
- Dungy, Tony (2007). Quiet Strength : Men's Bible Study. Group Publishing. ISBN 978-0-7644-3662-8.
- Dungy, Tony; Bates, Amy June (2008). You Can Do It!. Little Simon Inspirations. ISBN 978-1-4169-5461-3.
- Dungy, Tony; Whitaker, Nathan (2009). Uncommon: Finding Your Path to Significance. Tyndale House. ISBN 978-1-4143-2681-8.
- Dungy, Tony; Whitaker, Nathan (2010). The Mentor Leader: Secrets to Building People & Teams That Win Consistently. Tyndale House. ISBN 978-1-4143-3804-0.
- Dungy, Tony; Dungy, Lauren; Mazellan, Ron (2011). You Can Be a Friend. Little Simon Inspirations. ISBN 978-1-4169-9771-9.
- Dungy, Tony; Whitaker, Nathan (2011). The One Year Uncommon Life Daily Challenge. Tyndale House. ISBN 978-1-4143-4828-5
