= Zone defense in gridiron football =

Pass coverage schemes

Example of a Cover 3 shell, named for its three deep defenders (blue deep thirds).

Zone coverage (also called zone defense) is a gridiron football pass coverage scheme in which defenders are responsible for covering specified areas (zones) of the field rather than following individual receivers. In typical zone coverages, linebackers and defensive backs divide the field into underneath and deep zones, attempting to limit passing lanes, keep receivers in front of the defense, and rally to tackle after completions. Zone coverage is commonly contrasted with man-to-man defense, where each defender is assigned an eligible receiver.

== Types of zone coverage ==
=== Coverage shells ===
In the following, "cover" refers to the deep coverage structure (the number and alignment of defenders responsible for the deep portion of the field). Coverage shells can be paired with either zone or man principles underneath; for example, Cover 0 and Cover 1 are typically associated with man coverage, while Cover 2–6 are commonly associated with zone coverages. The number in "Cover #" typically refers to the number of defenders with deep coverage responsibility.

Modern defensive coverage shells are also modeled mathematically and computationally. Sports analytics researchers utilize high-frequency player tracking data, such as NFL Next Gen Stats, to model these coverage zones dynamically. Computational models of pass coverage use spatial discretization, such as square or hexagonal grids, and physics-inspired movement dynamics to identify "safe" passing regions where an offensive receiver can reach the ball before any defender; passes into these safe target areas yield significantly higher completion rates of 89% versus 59% outside safe zones. Additionally, spatial analytics models in American football use Voronoi tessellations of player tracking data based on coordinate positions to define the dynamic space ownership of players on the field, which represents the area a player can reach faster than any other player. To automatically classify and identify pass coverage shells (such as man or zone coverages) from spatial movement vectors, unsupervised machine learning techniques, such as Gaussian Mixture Models, are applied to tracking data to evaluate defenders' movements and relative distances to offensive players.

=== Underneath coverage (beneath the shell) ===
The deep shell describes the defenders responsible for the deep portions of the field. Underneath, a defense may play zone drops (e.g., flats and hook/curl zones) or man coverage, depending on the call and situation.

=== Cover 2 ===
Example of Cover 2 zone coverage

In traditional Cover 2 schemes, the free safety (FS) and strong safety (SS) have deep responsibilities, each guarding half of the field. The primary difference between traditional cover 2 and Tampa-2 is the responsibility of the middle linebacker. In traditional cover 2, the middle linebacker covers the underneath zone, with the two safeties taking responsibility for half of the field in the deep zone. Tampa 2 is a hybrid of cover 2 and cover 3 (see below) where the deep safeties have responsibility only for the deep zone "outside the hash marks," while the middle linebacker drops into the middle quarter of the field, covering deep passes between the hash marks.

Cover 2 can be run from any seven-man defensive fronts such as the 3-4 defense and the 4-3 defense. (It is difficult to implement Cover 2 from an eight-in-the-box front, because the strong safety or someone replacing him is usually the eighth man.) Various "underneath" coverages played by cornerbacks and linebackers may also be implemented. For example, Cover 2 Man means 2 safeties have deep responsibility while the cornerbacks and linebackers follow their offensive assignments in one-on-one coverage. Cover 2 can also be paired with underneath zone schemes: Cover 2 Zone refers to 2 safeties with deep responsibility, but now the CBs and LBs drop back into specific coverage zones where they defend passes only in their assigned area.

Teams that play Cover 2 shells usually subscribe to the "bend-but-don't-break" philosophy, preferring to keep offensive players in front of them for short gains while limiting long passes. This is in stark contrast to the more aggressive Cover 1 type scheme, which leaves the offensive team's wide receivers in single man-to-man coverage with only one deep helper. By splitting the deep field between two defenders, the defense can drastically reduce the number of long gains.

In Cover 2, the cornerbacks are considered to be "hard" corners, meaning that they have increased run stopping responsibilities and generally defend against shorter passes. However, if two receivers run a deep route on a certain side of the field, that side's corner has deep coverage responsibility as well. The "hard" corners also generally bear the responsibility of "pressing" or "jamming" the offensive receivers- disrupting the receivers' intended path downfield. It also relies heavily on the "Mike" (Middle) linebacker's ability to quickly drop deep downfield into pass coverage when he reads a pass.

A variant of Cover 2 is the Inverted Cover 2, in which either right before or after the snap the corners "bail" out while the safeties come up—in effect switching responsibilities. This strategy may be employed to trick a quarterback who has not correctly interpreted the shift. The main drawback here is that the middle of the field is left open.

==== Advantages ====
The advantage of cover 2 is that it provides great versatility to the defense because the corners can play run, short pass, and deep pass with the confidence that they have support from two deep safeties.

==== Disadvantages ====
The main weakness of the Cover 2 shell occurs in the middle of the field between the safeties. When the ball is hiked, the safeties will often move toward the sidelines in order to cover any long passes to quick wide receivers. This movement creates a natural hole between the safeties that can be attacked. By sending a receiver (usually a tight end) into the hole (in the middle of the field), the offense forces the safety to make a decision: play the vulnerable hole or help out on the wide receiver. The quarterback reads the safety's decision and decides on the best matchup (i.e., which mismatch is better: tight end vs. safety or wide receiver vs. cornerback). This disadvantage is ameliorated somewhat in the Tampa 2 variation; however, in moving the middle linebacker into deep coverage, it opens up the "underneath" center zone in the 5-10 yard range. There is also a little pocket on the sideline in between the top of the corner's zone and the bottom of the safety's zone. If the wide receiver were to run up the sideline, there would be a period of time where the corner has to hand the receiver off to the safety. In this window, if a ball is thrown well enough, the receiver is unguarded and able to catch the ball.

Routes that work well against Cover 2 are: corner routes from the inside receiver skinny post from the inside receiver (given the middle linebacker doesn't run with the vertical inside route concept) post-wheel route concept from the 1 and 2 receiver (this forces the safety to take the post, and the corner to run with the wheel route) 4 verticals (it is difficult for the corner to decipher the 4 vertical route concept and realize they have to run with the outside receiver)

Another disadvantage of Cover 2 is that it leaves only seven men in the "box" (the area near the ball at the snap) to defend against the run. In contrast Cover 1 and Cover 3 usually have eight men in the box.

A potential problem with Cover 2 is that defensive pressure on the quarterback must be provided nearly exclusively by the front linemen, as all other defenders are involved in pass coverage. If the defensive linemen do not provide adequate pressure on the quarterback, the offense is afforded plenty of time to create and exploit passing opportunities. Blitzing in Cover 2 often creates greater areas of weakness in the defense than other coverages. Thus, unsuccessful blitzes can prove to be more productive for the offense than in other schemes.

=== Cover 3 ===
Example of Cover 3 zone coverage

In Cover 3, the two corners and free safety each have responsibility for a deep third of the field, while the strong safety plays like a linebacker. This coverage is generally considered to be a run stopping defense as it focuses on preventing big pass plays and stopping the run while giving up short passes.

On the snap, the CBs work for depth, backpedaling into their assigned zone. One safety moves toward the center of the field. The other safety is free to rotate into the flat area (about 2–4 yards beyond the line of scrimmage), provide pass coverage help, or blitz.

==== Advantages ====
One of the biggest benefits of the Cover 3 coverage scheme is the ability to walk the strong safety up into the box with minimal to no changes in the coverage due to the pre-snap center field position of the free safety. This enables the defense to play strong against the run, but still prevent explosive plays such as a long pass or break away run. This advantage is most pronounced versus two tight end sets which naturally creates 8 holes for running backs, whereas in cover 2 schemes there are only 7 defenders in the box leaving 1 hole uncovered, or requiring a defender to cover 2 holes.

==== Disadvantages ====
Cover 3 schemes are susceptible to short, timed passes to the outside due to the hard drop of both cornerbacks. This puts pressure on the outside linebackers to react to pass plays and get into their drop quickly if they need to cover a receiver.

Another disadvantage of Cover 3 schemes is they are relatively easy to diagnose by opposing quarterbacks. Because of this, teams will often employ slight wrinkles in their coverage to confuse offenses. An example of this includes employing man coverage on one side and zone coverage on another, or swapping coverage zones between defenders. It also leaves the seams open and forces the safety to choose a man to cover on four verticals, leaving one open.

=== Cover 4 ===
Example of cover 4 pass coverage

Cover 4, or quarters, refers to 4 deep defenders each guarding one-fourth of the deep zone. Cover 4 schemes are almost always used to defend against deep passes. (See also Prevent defense).

The most basic Cover 4 scheme involves 3 CBs and 2 safeties. Upon snap, the CBs work for depth, backpedaling into their assigned zone. Both safeties backpedal towards their assigned zone.

As with other coverage shells, Cover 4 is paired with underneath man or zone coverage in its most basic form.

==== Advantages ====
The main advantage of a Cover 4 defense is that it is extremely difficult for even the best quarterbacks to complete long passes against it. Therefore, this coverage is generally used as a prevent defense to be used near the end of a game or half, meaning that the defense sacrifices the run and short pass to avoid giving up the big play with the confidence that the clock will soon expire.

Cover 4 also has the advantage of using safeties in run support, as opposed to cornerbacks, as would be the case in a Cover 2 scheme. This gives the defense nine in the box and the ability to stop the run with an extra defender on either side. The play-side safety would come up in support on a running play while the back-side safety would be responsible for the middle third of the field, and the cornerbacks would have the deep outside thirds.

==== Disadvantages ====
The main weakness of Cover 4 shells is the large amount of space left open by the retreating defensive backs. Since the defensive backs are working for depth, short pass routes underneath can enable the quarterback to make short- and medium- length passes, as well as isolate a defensive back on a wide receiver near the sideline with little help.

=== Cover 6 ===
Example of Cover 6 zone coverage

Cover 6 calls defensive strength to the Field instead of to the offensive formation or front, and organize personnel by field-side player and boundary-side player. The position of the ball on the field therefore dictates the strength of the offense. In Cover 6 the field safety and field corner cover fourths of the field, and depend on a field outside linebacker to support them underneath. The free safety covers the boundary-side deep half, and the boundary corner plays the flat. Thus, the field side of the coverage is quarters, and the boundary side is cover 2.

The Cover 6 gets its name from the fact that it combines elements of the Cover 2 (the strong safety covering half the field) and the Cover 4 on the opposite side.

On the strong side, the corner and safety play "Cover 4 rules", which as above the corner and safety each have a quarter of the field working for depth in their zones. The "Sam" linebacker will be dropping outside to cover the flats. If in 3-4 the Middle Backer will cover that sides hook to curl if not blitzing.

On the weak side, the corner and safety play "Cover 2 rules", which as above the corner stays home in the flats, and the safety covers the deep half. The "Will" backer will play hook to curl or blitz depending on the call. If in 3-4 usually the "Will" or the Middle Backer will blitz from that side.

The Cover 6 is also good for calling a corner blitz from the weak side, and having the backer cover flats instead.

==== Advantages ====
Cover 6 blends the best of Cover 2 and Cover 4. On the boundary, Cover 6 uses a Cover 2 corner. The boundary corner sits at 5–7 yards and is in excellent position to attack flat passes and wide runs, as well as blitz from a short field position. The boundary safety plays at 12–15 yards and supports the boundary corner, providing good pass defense over the top, as well as being able to assist on any vertical release by a third receiver from the field side. The field safety plays a hard read technique from 7–8 yards, reading first for run. He will fit hard and fast on run plays. He defends the pass by squatting or dropping over the #2 wide receiver. He will then play vertical patterns and in patterns by #2 then #1, passing off inside patterns. The Field corner plays a quarters deep coverage from 7–8 yards, reading the #1 wide receiver and playing all vertical and outside patterns.

==== Disadvantages ====
Cover 6 has the disadvantages of both Cover 2 and Cover 4. The field side is generally soft on flat coverage. The field side corner can be left in single coverage deep as well. On runs, the field side may be spread by a tight end and 2 receiver formation, offering an advantage on the edge. The Boundary side is hard behind the corner to the sideline, as well as in the seam between corner and linebacker.

=== Man Coverages ===
==== Cover 0 ====
Cover 0 refers to pure man coverage with no deep defender, not zone coverage. Similar to Cover 1, Cover 0 has the same strengths and weaknesses but employs an extra rusher at the expense of deep coverage help leaving each pass defender man-to-man. Cover 0 is an aggressive scheme that allows for numerous blitz packages, as it is easier for players to drop off their coverage and rush the quarterback. However, there is no "help over the top"—if a wide receiver "beats" (achieves separation from) his defender, there is no one left in the secondary who can make up the coverage on the receiver, which could result in an easy pass completion and possible touchdown.

==== Cover 1 ====
Cover One is a man-to-man coverage style for all the defensive backs except for one player (usually a safety), who is not assigned a man to cover but rather plays deep and reacts to the development of the play. Often, the safety will remain in a pass coverage position and play a zone defense by guarding the middle of the secondary, reacting to runs or completed passes, and double-teaming a receiver if needed.

In a traditional Cover 1, the free safety plays deep, and all of the other defenders lock in man coverage for an assigned player for the duration of the play. Essentially, during the pre-snap read, each defender identifies the coverage responsibilities and does not change the assignment. Some teams play a variant of Cover 1 called Cover 7. In Cover 7, the free safety still plays deep, but the underneath coverage is much more flexible, and the defenders switch assignments as the play develops in an attempt to improve defensive positions to make a play on the ball. Examples of these switches include double covering a certain receiver and using defensive help to undercut a route to block a throwing lane.

===== Advantages =====
Cover 1 schemes are usually very aggressive, preferring to proactively disrupt the offense by giving the quarterback little time to make a decision while collapsing the pocket quickly. This is the main advantage of Cover 1 schemes—the ability to blitz from various pre-snap formations while engaging in complex man-to-man coverage schemes post-snap. For example, a safety may blitz while a cornerback is locked in man coverage with a receiver. Conversely, the cornerback may blitz with the safety rotating into man coverage on the receiver post-snap.

===== Disadvantages =====
The main weakness of the Cover 1 scheme is that there is only one deep defender that must cover a large amount of field and provide help on any deep threats. Offenses can attack Cover 1 schemes by sending two receivers on deep routes, provided that the quarterback has enough time for his receivers to get open. The deep defender must decide which receiver to help out on, leaving the other in man coverage which may be a mismatch.

A secondary weakness is inherent in its design: the use of man coverage opens up yards after catch lanes. Man coverage is attacked by offenses in various ways that try to isolate their best athletes on defenders by passing them the ball quickly before the defender can react or designing plays that clear defenders from certain areas, thus opening yards after catch lanes.

== Specialized Variants ==
=== Tampa 2 ===
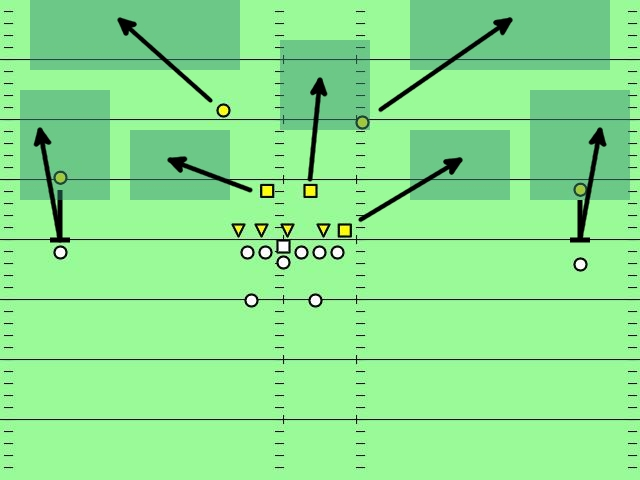
Tampa 2 defensive scheme. The dark green rectangles shows coverage zones. (hybrid Cover 2/Cover 3)

Tampa 2 refers to a style of defense played by the Tampa Bay Buccaneers and implemented by its coaches, Tony Dungy, Lovie Smith, and Monte Kiffin. Because of its success it has become popular with many professional and college teams. It blends the Cover 2 and Cover 3 defenses by having two defensive backs, usually the safeties, in deep coverage on either side of the field, and a middle linebacker covering the medium to deep middle. Its benefit over cover 2 is that the sidelines and middle of the field are better protected against deep threats, with the drawback being a larger open area in the short middle of the field underneath the middle linebacker. Its benefit over cover 3 is that it only dedicates two defensive backs to deep coverage rather than three, allowing for better protection against short outside routes. The Tampa 2 generally requires a quick and agile middle linebacker who is capable of staying with tight ends and wide receivers in pass coverage.

== See also ==
- Man-to-man defense
- American football strategy

== Bibliography ==
- Vanderlinden, Ron (2008). Football's Eagle and Stack Defenses. Human Kinetics. ISBN 978-0736072533.
- Bernstein, Steve (2000). "The Three Deep Zone Coverage". Defensive Football Strategies. American Football Coaches Association.
- Jaworski, Ron; Cosell, Greg; and Plaut, David (2010) The Games that Changed the Game. New York: Ballantine.
