= Cornerback =

Position in gridiron football

Cornerbacks across from their assigned receivers in a base 3–4 defense

A cornerback (CB) is a member of the defensive backfield or secondary in gridiron football. Cornerbacks cover receivers most of the time, but also blitz and defend against such offensive running plays as sweeps and reverses. They create turnovers through hard tackles, interceptions, and deflecting forward passes.

Other members of the defensive backfield include strong and free safeties.

The cornerback position requires speed, agility, strength, and the ability to make rapid sharp turns. A cornerback's skill set typically requires proficiency in anticipating the quarterback and wide receiver, backpedaling, executing single and zone coverage, disrupting pass routes, block shedding, and tackling. Cornerbacks are among the fastest players on the field. Because of this, they are frequently used as return specialists on punts or kickoffs.

== Overview ==
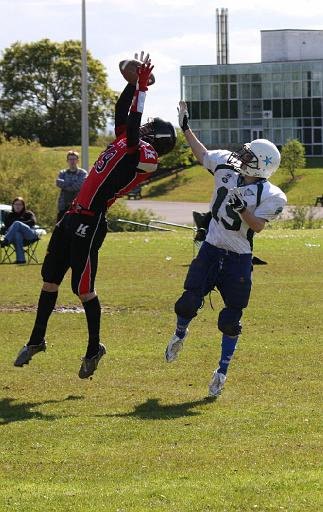
A cornerback for Trinity College rises to intercept a pass

The cornerback's chief responsibility is to defend against the offense's pass. The rules of American professional football and American college football do not mandate starting position, movement, or coverage zones for any member of the defense. There are no "illegal defense" formations. Cornerbacks can be anywhere on the defensive side of the line of scrimmage at the start of play, although their proximity, formations, and strategies are outlined by the coaching staff or captain. Examples of cornerbacks in the NFL are Jalen Ramsey, Patrick Surtain II, Marlon Humphrey, Sauce Gardner, L'Jarius Sneed, and Charvarius Ward.

Most modern National Football League defensive formations use four defensive backs (two safeties and two corners); Canadian Football League defenses generally use five defensive backs (one safety, two defensive halfbacks, and two corners). A cornerback's responsibilities vary depending on how the defense assigns protection to its defensive secondary. In terms of defending the run, often corners may be assigned to blitz depending on the coaching decisions in a game. In terms of defending passing plays, a corner will be typically assigned to either zone or man-to-man coverage.

The most effective cornerbacks are typically called "lockdown corners". These elite defenders cover an offensive receiver so effectively on either side of the field that the quarterback does not target the receiver being covered.

=== Zone ===
In zone coverage, the cornerback defends an assigned area of the field. Many schemes and variations were created to provide defensive coordinators great latitude and flexibility which aim to thwart offensive schemes.

When a team is using zone coverage, some areas of the field require special attention when defending against specific pass plays. They include the flats (to defend the screen pass and hitch routes), mid range zones including the void (to defend the "stop n go", quick post, fade, hook, curl, and "sideline" or "out" routes), and finally the deep zones (to defend the post/deep post, chair, streak, "fly", "go", bomb, or Hail Mary routes). These are basic terms (perhaps the most generic) for the basic zones and routes which vary system to system, league to league, and team to team.

Advanced forms of coverage may involve "quarterback spies" and "containment" coverages, as well as various "on field adjustments" that require shifts and rotations; the latter usually initiated by the captain of the secondary (typically the free safety) during the quarterback's cadence. At this time the captain attempts to "read" the alignment (pro set, split set, trips, etc.) of the offensive "skill players" (backs and receivers) in order to best predict and counter the play the offense will run. He will base his decision on past experience, game preparation, and a sound comprehension of his teammates strengths, abilities, and tendencies. These adjustments may change on a play by play basis, due to substitutions or even evolving weather or field conditions. For example, defensive coordinators may favor a tendency to play a less aggressive containment style zone coverage during wet or slippery field conditions to avoid problems associated with over-pursuit (when a defender takes a poor angle on a ball carrier and cannot redirect in time due to poor footing).

=== Cover 1 ===
The Cover 1 defense is an aggressive formation employed against offenses trying to gain short yardage. In the Cover 1 defense, one defender—normally a safety—plays deep zone downfield, providing security over the top and freeing the other safety to rush the line of scrimmage or drop back into coverage. Meanwhile, the corner's primary responsibility is to play on or off the receiver and not release him vertically. Defensive coordinators typically call for Cover 1 formations only when their cornerbacks are skilled at playing man-to-man coverage.

=== Cover 2 ===
The Cover 2 formation, which deploys four defensive backs in a "two-deep zone", is popular among NFL defensive coordinators because it uses two safeties to defend the deep routes instead of one. The safeties line up on or near their respective hashmarks between 11 and 15 yards off the line of scrimmage, while the cornerbacks line up around five yards from the wide receivers nearest to each sideline. With the safeties able to watch the play develop in front of them, the corners are free to pursue a more aggressive style of play.

In Cover 2, the cornerback is usually responsible for "containment", meaning that he is tasked with preventing any eligible receiver or ball carrier from running between him and the sideline. He funnels receivers toward the middle of the field and may physically "jam" them within five yards of the line of scrimmage in order to disrupt their assigned routes. If he determines that the offense is not attempting a running play or a pass into the flat, he then drops back to defend the secondary. This is often referred to as the "catch-and-run" technique. Typically, cornerbacks mirror each other's zone responsibilities. However, sometimes they play a "man-up" style of bump-and-run coverage designed to eliminate the short pass, where the receiver is forced to the near sideline, which is the opposite of the run-oriented "containment" style of Cover 2.

=== Cover 3 ===
In a "Cover 3", the two corners and free safety defend their assigned deep thirds of the field, where the corners defend the outside thirds, (hence the term corner) while the safety defends the middle third. This allows the strong safety to address a full range of duties depending on what reads he makes coupled with the coverage called. These duties may simply include single or zone coverage, being a quarterback spy, providing extra run support in short yardage situations, or to stunt or blitz through a gap or from the end.

=== Cover 4 ===
In a "Cover 4" each defensive back is responsible for covering his designated "deep fourth" of the field, while other defensive players are responsible for covering the underneath areas. Sometimes Cover 4 is used as a "prevent defense".

Variations of these coverages exist to counter the many styles of offenses a defense may face on any given week. For example, one variation of the Cover 2 allocates the weak-side corner (e.g.: typically the "right cornerback" when playing against right-handed quarterbacks) to cover half the field in order to free up a safety; the idea being to allow the safety to engage a different part of the field, blitz, contain, or spy. The strong side cornerback (the "left cornerback") may be in a variety of different alignments which may include "loose man", "man-under", or "man-up". Although these are forms of single coverage, more often than not his responsibility is usually limited to an initial jam and funnel with a subsequent drop back into the "void". This pie-shaped slice of field is included with your most basic 2 Deep Zone coverage. One interesting aspect sometimes encountered with Cover 2 is that it is possible for one corner to be in a zone coverage, where he funnels and drops into the void, while another may be in man coverage. However, your basic garden variety 2 Deep Zone usually employs the two safeties to share half the field responsibilities, with the two corners funneling.

== Jamming the receiver ==
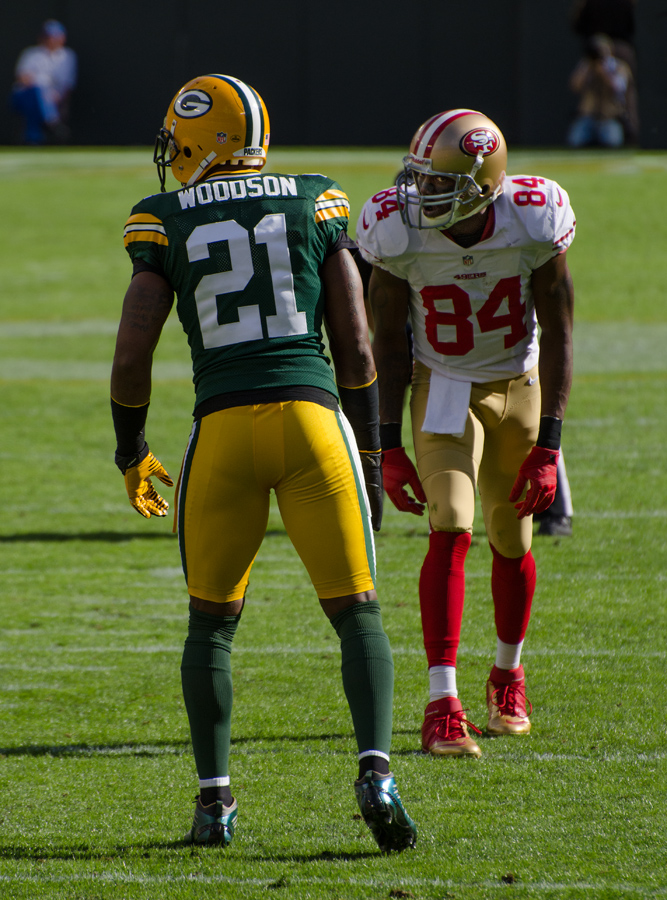
Green Bay Packers cornerback Charles Woodson (21) covering San Francisco 49ers wide receiver Randy Moss (84).

When a cornerback is attempting to jam a receiver, he is trying to disrupt the receiver's route at the line of scrimmage. Many routes are precisely coordinated between the quarterback and the receiver, to the point that a quarterback may throw the ball without looking, knowing his receiver will be in an exact spot after a certain time. Jamming will disrupt the timing between the two, which provides the defense with extra time to sack the quarterback (sometimes called a "coverage sack"), or force an ill-timed throw that misses the target. In addition, a proper jam allows the safety or linebacker to provide stronger run support because he then has more time to drop back into zone coverage in the event of a pass. In other words, he has been granted more time by the corner to recover from his mistakes if he anticipates a run when in fact the play is a pass.

Proper jamming technique requires the cornerback to use their legs, shoulder width apart. At the same time, the cornerback thrusts their arms forward into the receiver's chest to maximize power. When properly executed, a jam can knock a receiver off his feet. Jamming is only legal within five yards from the line of scrimmage.

If the jam fails, the cornerback is usually flat footed and not in a suitable position to defend the mid to long-range passes. When this occurs, the safeties and linebackers usually cannot return to their zone obligations in time, especially if they were anticipating a run as the play began. In essence, the defense is unnecessarily "stretched" to its breaking point. Receivers who can effectively avoid the jam and stretch defenses are far more likely to create big play opportunities for the offense. Therefore, it is vital that a cornerback execute a proper funnel or jam to allow safeties and linebackers enough time to return to their zone responsibilities in the event of an unforeseen pass play. By working together and familiarizing where one's help may come from, a higher degree of confidence is established among the defensive secondary as a unit, with the result translating into a much more formidable defense against both the run and pass.

== Single/man-to-man coverage ==
In single or man to man coverage, the cornerback is responsible for a particular receiver assigned to him. As the play begins, the corner may either attempt to "jam" the receiver at the line, play a step or two off of him, or concede a few yards and play with a "cushion". Cushions can range from a yard or two, to forty yards in a "prevent defense" situation. Cushion is just how far off the defender plays away from the offensive player he is assigned to defend. When lining up in front of the receiver to "jam" him or playing just a few steps off, it is important that the corner keeps his body in front of the receiver's body. The easiest way for a corner to be in position is to line up slightly inside of the receiver and the ball, and keep his eyes looking between the receiver's hip and his knees. If a cornerback loses focus on his receiver, the receiver will run straight past him, and then it leads to corners having to use the cushion technique. Generally, cushions are smaller in single coverage and larger in zone coverage.

Single coverage in the "red zone" – the area between the twenty-yard line and the goal line – is usually designed to prevent receivers from slanting towards the middle of the field. These types of routes are difficult to stop in the red zone because this area is usually congested with bodies colliding, crossing, and weaving in different directions. Although illegal, defenders are easily picked or screened by opposing receivers and sometimes by their own teammates; this is illegal yet difficult to enforce in short field, congested situations. To avoid this, it is often favorable for cornerbacks to either: "switch" assignments, where he will agree beforehand to trade assignments with one of his fellow defenders if the receivers criss-cross as the play begins, or alternatively, if a corner may instead line up very close to the receiver at the line of scrimmage to force or "jam" him toward the sideline (outside) without violating the 5-yard no-touch rule. Corners often refer to this second style of coverage as the "man under" technique.

Single coverage, or man to man coverage usually employs relatively few techniques. However, they are often initially displayed to resemble one another as much as possible to disguise the true motives of the defense, and be interchangeable as well. Although terminology for single coverage can vary, a few generic terms have been included to establish a general understanding of cornerback philosophy and how his function relates to the rest of the defense.

=== Loose man ===
Loose man requires cornerbacks to play off the receiver with a five to ten yard cushion. He usually does not touch the receiver and tries to keep his head on a swivel in order to move in whatever direction the receiver decides to shape his route. Typically with loose man coverage, the cornerback has little or no help from the safety in defending against the receiver.

This defense is used to discourage deeper passes, but often allows short yardage passes. A loose-man defense looks to create confusion for the quarterback by using blitzes. The idea is to disrupt the coordination necessary for short routes, which leads to drops or poorly thrown passes stalling the drive. However, accurate quarterbacks with a quick release of the football can exploit this and routinely make 3 to 5 yard completions to receivers.

=== Man up ===
The man up technique is widely considered the most challenging, as the corner grants the wide receiver an easier release, and the corner has to shadow the wide receiver's steps, staying in between the quarterback and the receiver. During this period, the corner does not know the receiver's route. When the ball is snapped, the corner will immediately turn and run with the receiver. A quick pass from the quarterback will result in the receiver having the free field in front of them. During the play, the cornerback will look back at the quarterback to judge whether the ball has been thrown, leaving them vulnerable to a wide receiver changing direction while they are unaware. A wet field makes this coverage more difficult, as it is harder for the cornerback to recover from losing the receiver. In addition, a float pass over the top of the receiver makes defending with this technique extremely hard, as the cornerback will always be a step behind. This coverage is usually reserved for elite cornerbacks with the highest coverage skills.

== See also ==
- Category:American football cornerbacks
- American football defensive schemes
