= Linebacker =

Defensive position in American football

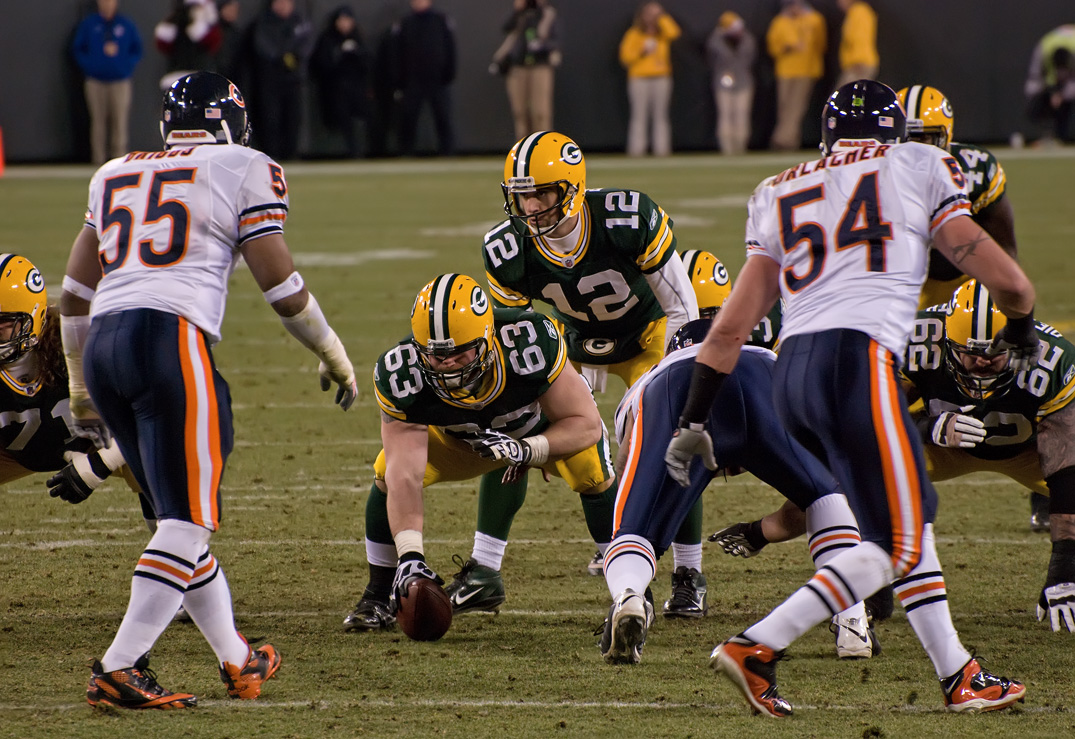
In white jerseys, Lance Briggs (#55) and Brian Urlacher (#54) of the Chicago Bears, are positioned as linebackers on Lambeau Field in 2011

Linebacker (LB) is a playing position in gridiron football. Linebackers are members of the defensive team, and typically line up three to five yards behind the line of scrimmage and so back up the defensive linemen. They play closer to the line of scrimmage than the defensive backs (secondary).

As such, linebackers play a hybrid role and are often the most versatile players on the defensive side of the ball; they can be asked to play roles similar to either a defensive lineman (such as stopping the runner on a running play) or a defensive back (such as dropping back into pass coverage). How linebackers play their positions depends on the defensive alignment, the philosophy of the coaching staff, and the particular play the offense may call.

Linebackers are divided into middle linebackers, sometimes called inside linebackers, and outside linebackers. The middle linebacker is frequently the "quarterback of the defense". His central role on the field means he is in the best position to call defensive plays and direct shifts and changes based on what the offense is doing. Outside linebackers are often in a position to blitz, a defensive maneuver where the player rushes into the offensive backfield to disrupt a running play or sack the quarterback on passing plays.

Historically, some of the most impactful defensive players, such as Pro Football Hall of Fame members Chuck Bednarik, Dick Butkus, Jack Lambert, Ray Lewis, Ray Nitschke, Mike Singletary, Brian Urlacher, and Lawrence Taylor, were linebackers.

== Formations ==
The number of linebackers is dependent upon the formation called for in the play; formations can call for as few as none, or as many as seven. Most defensive schemes call for three or four, which are generally named for the number of linemen, followed by the number of linebackers (with the 46 defense being an exception). For example, the 4–3 defense has four defensive linemen and three linebackers; conversely, the 3–4 defense has three linemen and four linebackers.

=== 4–3 defense ===
In the 4–3 defense there are four down linemen and three linebackers. On pass plays, the linebackers' responsibilities vary based upon whether a man or zone coverage is called. In zone coverage, the linebackers will generally drop into hook zones across the middle of the field. However, some zones will send the outside linebackers into the flats (area directly to the left and right of the hash marks, extending 4–5 yards downfield). In a man-to-man call, the "Sam" will often cover the tight end with help from a safety over the top, while at other times, the "Sam" and "Will" will be responsible for the first man out of the backfield on their side of the center, with the "Mike" covering if a second man exits on that side of the field.

In the "Tampa 2" zone defense, the middle linebacker is required to drop quickly into a deep middle zone pass coverage thus requiring a quick player at this position.

=== 3–4 defense ===
A base 3–4 defense

In the 3–4 defense three linemen play the line of scrimmage and four linebackers back them up, typically two outside linebackers and two inside linebackers.

The idea behind the 3–4 defense is to disguise where the fourth rusher will come from. Instead of the standard four down-linemen in the 4–3, only three players are clearly attacking nearly every play. The focus of the 3–4 defensive line is to occupy offensive linemen thus freeing the linebackers to tackle the running back or to rush the passer or otherwise drop into pass coverage.

The outside linebackers in a 3–4 defense line in front of the tackles like true defensive ends. The outside linebackers in a 3–4 defense must be very skilled at rushing the quarterback, and would be playing defensive end in a 4–3 defense. Among inside linebackers, one is generally a run-stuffer who is better able to handle offensive linemen and stop running backs, while the other is often a smaller, faster player who excels in pass coverage. However, the smaller or cover LB should also be able to scrape and plug running lanes decently.

The design concept of the 3–4 defense is to confuse the offensive line in their blocking assignments, particularly in pass blocking, and to create a more complex read for the quarterback. Many 3–4 defenses have the ability to quickly morph into a 4–3 on the field.

=== 46 defense ===
In the 46 defense, there are four linemen, three linebackers and a safety who is moved up behind the line of scrimmage. Thus, it appears as if there are four linebackers, but it is really three linebackers with one safety playing up with the other linebackers.

Three of the defensive linemen are over both of the offensive guards and the center, thereby making it difficult to double-team any one of the three interior defensive linemen. This can also take away the ability of the offense to pull the guards on a running play, because this would leave one of the defenders unblocked, or, at best, give another lineman a very difficult block to make on one of the defenders. The safety, like the linebacker, can blitz, play man-on-man, play zone, or drop back into deep coverage like a normal safety would do. The 46 is used in heavy run situations to stop the run, when a team wants to apply much pressure, or merely to confuse the quarterback and offensive line.

=== 4–4 defense ===
This defense is effective at run-stopping but is weaker than a 4–3 defense at pass coverage because it uses only three defensive backs. This defensive scheme is often played with two inside linebackers and two outside linebackers. The names of the two inside linebackers are often called Sam and Mike and these two are lined up about four yards from the line of scrimmage and are lined up with the offensive guard. The inside linebackers are often more of a run player so they will defend the run before they will the pass. These linebackers will be reading the offensive guard so they know what to do, so if the guard sets up to pass block the linebackers know to get into their zone in order to cover the pass. If the guard comes out for a run play they know that they need to fill the gap that they are supposed to so that they can make a play if it comes to them. Also, these inside linebackers are often called on a blitz which is when no matter what the offense does, as soon as that ball is snapped they are shooting their gap and trying to get into the backfield to make a play as fast as possible. Outside linebackers sometimes are considered to be pass players before they are run players. But that depends on where they are lined up. If they are outside of the box of the defense then they will be pass first players, but if they play inside the box lined up behind the defensive end then they are typically a run player. One of the outside linebackers is usually called into either blitz or pass coverage to make up for the missing defensive back. In the NFL and college football, this alignment is used mainly in short yardage situations or near the goal line. It is more extensively used in high school football.

== Types ==
=== Middle linebacker ===
A base 4–3 defense with the middle linebacker in blue

The middle linebacker (MLB), sometimes called the "Mike" or "Mac", is often referred to as the "quarterback of the defense". Often it is the middle linebacker who receives the defensive play calls from the sideline and relays that play to the rest of the team, and in the NFL he is usually the defensive player with the electronic sideline communicator. Middle linebackers commonly lead the team in tackles.

A jack-of-all-trades, the middle linebacker can be asked to blitz (though they often blitz less than the outside linebacker), cover, spy the quarterback, or even have a deep middle-of-the-field responsibility in the Tampa 2 defense.

=== Outside linebacker ===
The outside linebacker (OLB) is usually responsible for outside containment. This includes the strongside and weakside designations below. They are also responsible for blitzing the quarterback. They also have to perform pass coverage in the flats – sometimes called a drop. Outside linebackers pass coverages covers quick slants outside, curls, and flat routes.

==== Strongside linebacker ====
The strongside linebacker (SLB) is often nicknamed the "Sam" for purposes of calling a blitz. Since the strong side of the offensive team is the side on which the tight end lines up, or whichever side contains the most personnel, the strongside linebacker usually lines up across from the tight end. Often the strongside linebacker will be called upon to tackle the running back on a play because the back will be following the tight end's block. He is most often the strongest linebacker; at the least he possesses the ability to withstand, shed, and fight off blocks from a tight end or fullback blocking the backside of a pass play. The linebacker should also have strong safety abilities in pass situation to cover the tight end in man on man situations. He should also have considerable quickness to read and get into coverage in zone situations.

==== Weakside linebacker ====
The weakside linebacker (WLB), or the "Will" in 4–3 defense must be the fastest of the three, because he is often the one called into pass coverage. He is also usually chasing the play from the backside, so the ability to maneuver through traffic is a necessity for the Will. The Will usually aligns off the line of scrimmage at the same depth as Mike. Because of his position on the weakside, the Will does not often have to face large interior linemen one on one unless one is pulling. In coverage, the Will often covers the back that attacks his side of the field first in man coverage, while covering the weak flat in Texas Loop or hooks/curl areas in zone coverage.

=== Inside linebacker ===
The terms middle and inside linebacker (ILB) are often used interchangeably; they are also used to distinguish between a single middle linebacker playing in a 4–3 defense, and two inside linebackers playing in a 3–4 defense. In a 3–4 defense, the larger, more run-stopping-oriented linebacker is usually still called "Mike", while the smaller, more pass protection/route coverage-oriented player is called "Will". "Mikes" usually line up towards the strong side or on the side the offense is more likely to run on (based on personnel matchups) while "Wills" may line up on the other side or even a little further back between the defensive line and the secondary.

=== Buck ===
In a 3–4 defense, the weakside linebacker sometimes plays a hybrid role as a pass rushing, defensive end who stands up. He is sometimes called the backside linebacker, or "Buck", as well as other names like Joker, Jack or Bandit. A notable player in this role was Kevin Greene.

== History ==
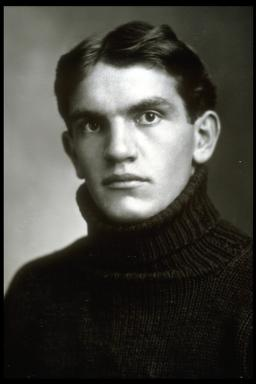
The University of Michigan is credited with creating the linebacker position, which was first played by Germany Schulz

Before the advent of the two-platoon system with separate units for offense and defense, the player who was the team's center on offense was often, though not always, the team's linebacker on defense. Hence, in contemporary football, one usually sees four defensive linemen to the offense's five or more. Most sources claim coach Fielding H. Yost and center Germany Schulz of the Michigan Wolverines invented the position. Schulz was Yost's first linebacker in 1904 when he stood up from his usual position on the line. Yost was horrified at first, but came to see the wisdom in Schulz's innovation. William Dunn of Penn State was another Western Conference linebacker soon after Schulz.

However, there are various historical claims tied to the linebacker position, including some before 1904. For example, Percy Given of Georgetown is another center with a claim to the title "first linebacker," supposedly standing up behind the line well before Schulz in a game against Navy in 1902. The first linebacker in the South was Frank Juhan, who played at Sewanee during 1908–1910.

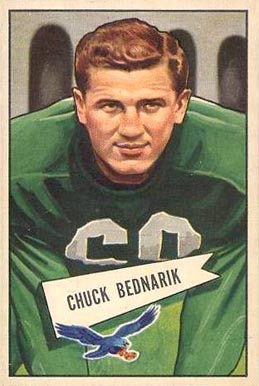
Chuck Bednarik of the Philadelphia Eagles

In the East, Ernest Cozens of Penn was "one of the first of the roving centers," another archaic term for the position, supposedly coined by Hank Ketcham of Yale. Walter E. Bachman of Lafayette was said to be "the developer of the 'roving center' concept". Edgar Garbisch of Army was credited with developing the "roving center method" of playing defensive football in 1921.

In professional football, Cal Hubbard is credited with pioneering the linebacker position. He starred as a tackle and end, playing off the line in a style similar to that of a modern linebacker. The New York Giants' John Alexander is considered the first person to have played outside linebacker in the NFL.

The Chuck Bednarik Award is awarded annually by the Maxwell Football Club to the best defensive player in college football. Chuck Bednarik was selected with the first overall pick of the 1949 NFL draft by the Philadelphia Eagles. He is considered one of the hardest hitting and best linebackers in NFL history. On November 20, 1960, Bednarik knocked New York Giants star halfback Frank Gifford unconscious with a tackle that was called "professional football's most notorious concussion". Bednarik's career-altering tackle of the Giants' star is remembered in football lore as "The Hit".

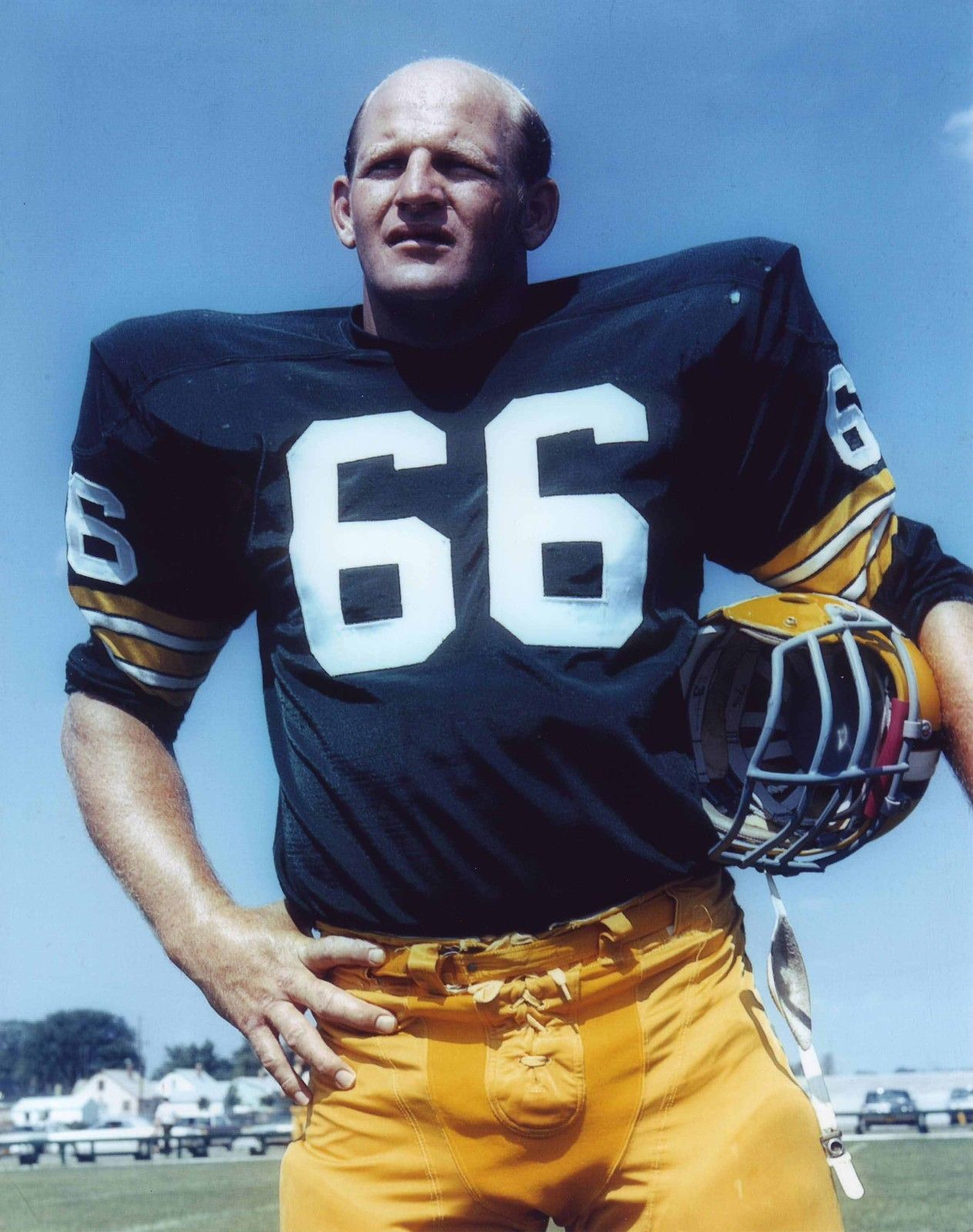
Ray Nitschke

Detroit Lions linebacker Joe Schmidt was selected NFL's most valuable defensive player in 1960 and 1963. Ray Nitschke anchored the defense of Vince Lombardi's Green Bay Packers. He played without his four front teeth. Kansas City Chiefs linebacker Bobby Bell was one of the first black outside linebackers in professional football.

=== Modern Super Bowl era ===
On January 15, 1967, the Chiefs lost Super Bowl I to Vince Lombardi's Green Bay Packers by a 35–10 score, forcing head coach Hank Stram to look for defensive players in the upcoming draft. Stram picked Willie Lanier.

Chicago Bears linebacker Dick Butkus is viewed as the "gold standard by which other middle linebackers are measured". In 2009, the NFL Network named Butkus the most feared tackler of all time.

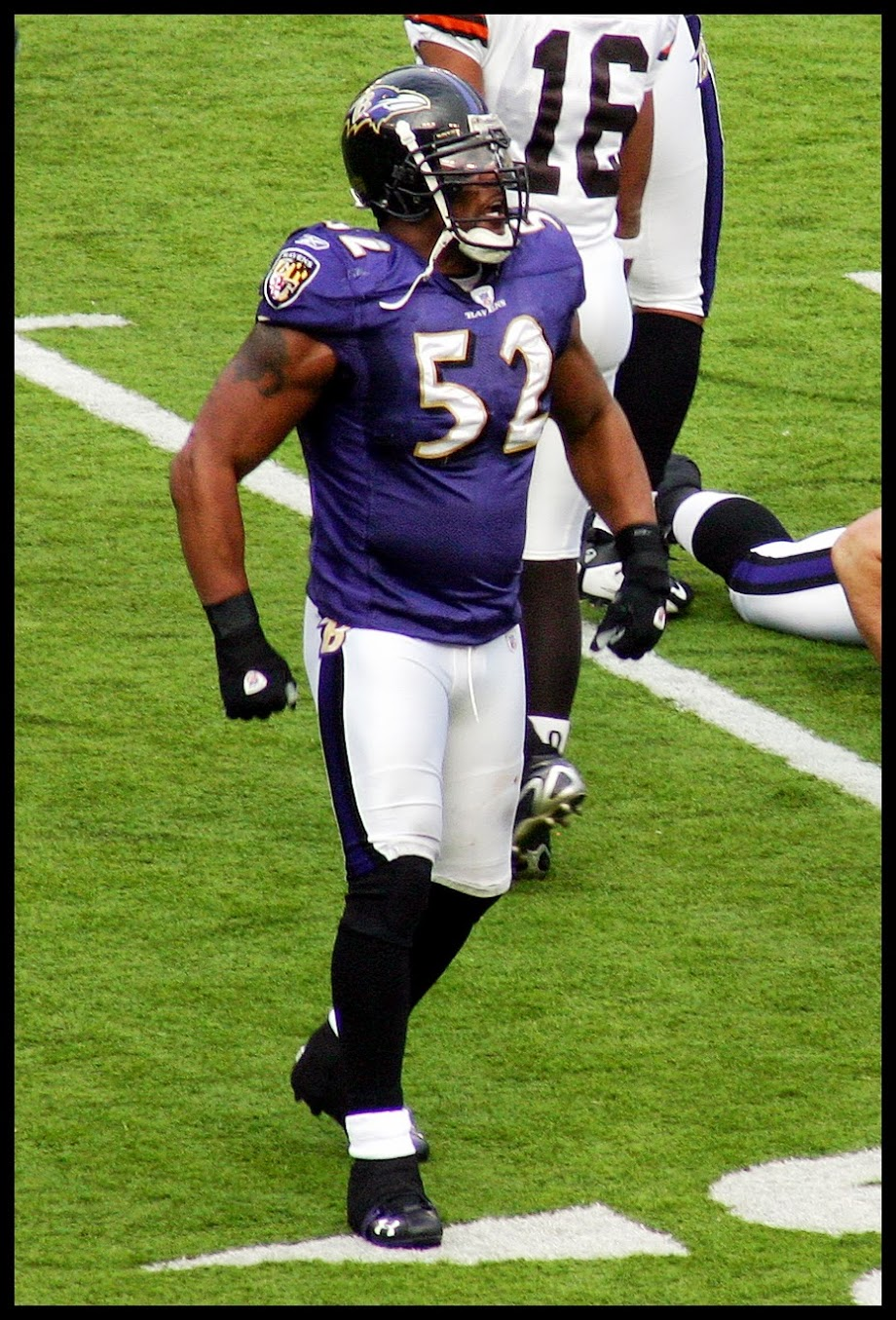
Ray Lewis

Jack Lambert and Jack Ham played behind the Steel Curtain of the 1970s, and Lambert was recognized by the Pro Football Hall of Fame in 1990 as "the greatest linebacker of his era." Colts and Raiders linebacker Ted Hendricks won 4 Super Bowls and in 2019 the NFL Football Journal named him the best punt and kick blocker of all time.

Bears linebacker Mike Singletary was known as "the Heart of the Defense" for their Monsters of the Midway defense in the mid-1980s. New York Giants linebacker Lawrence Taylor is almost universally regarded as the greatest defensive player of all time.

Baltimore Ravens linebacker Ray Lewis is considered one of the greatest linebackers of all time. Lewis has the most Pro Bowl selections by a linebacker with 13. With 12 is former Chargers linebacker Junior Seau, and with 11 is former Tampa Bay Buccaneers linebacker Derrick Brooks.

Bears linebacker Brian Urlacher led his team in sacks in 2000, and led his team in interceptions in 2007. In 2013, Panthers linebacker Luke Kuechly became the youngest recipient of the AP NFL Defensive Player of the Year Award in its history.
