= G. F. Newman =

British writer

G.F. Newman
- Born: 22 May 1944 (age 82); Kent, England
- Occupations: Writer and television producer
- Writing career
- Period: 1970s–present
- Genres: Crime fiction and politics

Gordon Frank Newman (born 22 May 1944) is an English writer and television producer. In addition to his two earlier series Law & Order and The Nation's Health, each based on his books, he is known for more recent TV series including Judge John Deed and New Street Law.

Newman's first book, Sir, You Bastard, was a bestseller on publication in 1970. It was to become the first in a series of three works featuring the character of Terry Sneed, an unscrupulous Scotland Yard inspector. The second of these is You Nice Bastard and the third You Flash Bastard/The Price. Other books he has written include Billy, The List, The Men with the Guns, Charlie and Joanna, Three Professional Ladies, Trading the Future / Circle of Poison, Law and Order, The Nation's Health, and his 2009 novel Crime and Punishment, which was adapted for radio and broadcast as The Corrupted.

== Biography ==
Gordon Newman was born in Kent in 1947. He attended a Stanislavsky acting school in Chislehurst, and wrote a script when he was 18 for the ITV police series No Hiding Place (1959–67).

Newman's late wife Rebecca (Hughes) Hall was also a creative writer. She scripted plays and films and authored books, on animal rights, as well as the semi-autobiographical novel "Frances and Her Ghosts".

== Writings in relation to personal views ==
Newman has very strong and sometimes controversial views on a variety of subjects, and these are reflected in his work. He takes an interest in animal rights and is a staunch vegan. When producing or directing television programmes he insists that no meat at all is consumed on the sets. He has compared the slaughter of animals to the holocaust. Newman is a believer in reincarnation and is influenced by the vegetarian John Todd Ferrier.

Newman has no political allegiance to either left or right wing and does not vote.

== Bibliography ==
Terry Sneed trilogy

1. Sir, You Bastard aka Rogue Cop (1970) ISBN 9780491002547 - Adapted as a 1974 film, The Take
2. You Nice Bastard (1972) ISBN 9780450011993
3. You Flash Bastard aka The Price (1974) ISBN 9780450021114

Law & Order

TV Series:

1. Detective's Tale (1977)
2. Villain's Tale (1977)
3. A Brief's Tale (1977)
4. Prisoner's Tale (1977)

Books: A trilogy of works consisting of

1. 'A Detective's Tale' ISBN 9780722163498
2. 'A Villain's Tale' ISBN 978-0722163634
3. 'A Prisoner's Tale' ISBN 978-0722163641

An omnibus edition including all three was published in 1984 by HarperCollins ISBN 9780586057834.

The Nation's Health Published in the UK by HarperCollins, ISBN 978-0586052303, and broadcast on Channel 4 in 1983.

1. Acute
2. Decline
3. Chronic
4. Collapse

Number One (1984, 1985 according to IMDB), about the exploitation of a snooker player by a professional promoter

Screen One

Series One

- Nineteen 96 (1989)

Series Four

- Black and Blue (1992)

Screen Two

Series Five

- Here is the News (1989)

For the Greater Good (3 Episodes, BBC, 1991):

- Member (1991)
- Mandarin (1991)
- Minister (1991)

The Healer

- The Healer (2 Part TV Movie, BBC, 1994) -The Healer received a Bafta award in 1996.

10x10

Series Eight, Episode 9

- Woe to the Hunter (1996)

Judge John Deed

TV series:

1. Pilot (2001)
2. Series 1 (2001)
3. Series 2 (2002)
4. Series 3 (2003–2004)
5. Series 4 (2005)
6. Series 5 (2006)
7. Series 6 (2007)

Books:

1. Guilty - Until Proven Otherwise (2020) ISBN 978-1853982002

New Street Law (2006-2007)

1. Series 1 (2006)
2. Series 2 (2007) NB IMDB credits Newman as 'co-creator' of 4 of the 6 episodes of Series 2.

The Corrupted (2013/2015/2017/2018/2020/2021)

The Corrupted is an adaptation for radio of Newman's novel Crime and Punishment; it was broadcast on BBC Radio 4's afternoon play slot.

Other Novels

- Billy (1972) ISBN 9780722163542 (Broadcast, adapted for TV, in BBC's Play for Today: Season 10, Episode 6, -1979)
- The abduction (1972) ISBN 9780450012716
- The Player and the Guest (1972) ISBN 9780722163566
- Three Professional Ladies (1973) ISBN 9780722163535
- The Split (1973) ISBN 9780450014772
- The Streetfighter (1975) ISBN 0352398337 aka Hard Times (U.S. title), novelization of the screenplay by Walter Hill
- The Guvnor (1978) ISBN 9780246108852
- The List (1979) ISBN 9780436307003
- The Obsession (1980) ISBN 9780246110626
- Charlie and Joanna (1981) ISBN 9780586051849
- Men with the Guns (1982) ISBN 9780722163689
- Set a Thief (1986) ISBN 9780718126704
- Testing Ground (1987) ISBN 9780718128685
- Circle of Poison (1995) ISBN 9780671852115 -Originally published as Trading The Future (1992) ISBN 9780356200200
- Crime and Punishment (2009) ISBN 9781849160124
- The Exorcist (A trilogy- part one, Dark Heart (2010) ISBN 9781493634606)
- Merry Christmas! (2024) ISBN 9781917163606

Plays

- Operation Bad Apple (1982) ISBN 9780413502704
- An Honourable Trade (1984) ISBN 9780413578105

Genre Fiction

- Trading the Future (1992) ISBN 9780356200200

== The Corrupted ==
The Corrupted is an adaptation for radio of his novel Crime and Punishment. It stars Toby Jones as Joseph Olinska.

Series 1, a 10 part radio drama, was broadcast on BBC Radio 4's 'afternoon play' slot in 2013.

Series 2, a further 10 part radio drama, formed the second part, first broadcast on BBC Radio 4 starting 19 January 2015.

Series 3 began airing on Radio 4 on Monday 9 January 2017.

Series 4 began broadcasting on Radio 4 on Monday 25 June 2018.

Series 5 began airing on Radio 4 on Monday 20 April 2020.

Series 6 began airing on Radio 4 on Monday 10 May 2021. [The final series]

=== Reception ===
The BBC's Feedback programme on 27/01/2017 included discussion on Series 3 of The Corrupted, including talking "to Radio 4's Commissioning Editor for Drama, Jeremy Howe, about why he felt The Corrupted was worth 7 hours of airtime over just two weeks" and the assessment that "many loved it, though some were not so keen on the venal themes".

Describing the series as 'fiction in a factual world', Feedback went on to note the suggestion in The Corrupted storyline, that, after the character Joseph Oldman had deployed some of his wealth to bankroll the Conservative Party, Margaret Thatcher (ignorant of his gangster background) expressed interest in appointing him to the post of chancellor of the exchequer. It also discussed the murder of Airey Neave, which - although claimed by the INLA - by juxtaposition of themes in the series, it was implied, might have had some level of involvement of the Secret Intelligence Service (SIS), or MI5, who might have desired to silence him to avoid exposure of others with influence.

== Opinions ==
In May 1994 Newman gave a half-hour Opinions lecture televised on Channel 4 and subsequently published in The Independent as "Wisdom Needs No Votes".

== Trading The Future ==
Trading The Future was initially published by Macdonald in the UK in a hardcover edition in 1991. It was subsequently re-released as Circle of Poison, in 1995. See the related topic, Circle of Poison.

== For the Greater Good ==
For the Greater Good was a three-part Whitehall drama TV series, with the titles (Member, Mandarin, Minister) reflecting the perspectives of the three principal protagonists (a British Member of Parliament, a Whitehall Civil Servant, and a Government Minister, respectively). It was first aired on the BBC in 1991. The theme music was by Orchestral Manoeuvres in the Dark.

== The Nation's Health ==
The Nation's Health is a four-episode TV series written by Newman based on his book of the same name, originally broadcast on the fledgling Channel 4 UK TV channel in 1983. The series consists of four episodes titled Acute, Decline, Chronic, and Collapse.

=== Reception ===
Sherryl Wilson writes: "Although the series is a negative critique of the NHS staff in general, it does also offer a damning insight into the policies that were seen to be disabling the NHS."

In a BMJ abstract one can read: "How 'little relation to reality' these programmes bore to the NHS in the early 1980s is up for debate, but something in these programmes smacks of truth, raising questions that still need to be asked of the NHS and its staff." Sherryl Wilson draws a comparison with conclusions from the 2009 enquiry into Stafford Hospital. The BMJ abstract continues "These programmes make fascinating if difficult watching, because they do not show the deference towards the medical profession and the NHS shown by previous British dramas such as Doctor Finlay's Casebook, General Hospital, and Emergency Ward 10. Their gritty influence on later British medical dramas, such as Casualty can be seen clearly."
