= Coroner (TV series) =

Canadian crime drama TV series

- Genre: Crime drama; Police procedural; Mystery
- Based on: Jenny Cooper series by M. R. Hall
- Developed by: Morwyn Brebner
- Starring: Serinda Swan; Roger Cross; Ehren Kassam; Éric Bruneau; Tamara Podemski; Saad Siddiqui; Lovell Adams-Gray; Kiley May; Andy McQueen; Jennifer Dale; Shawn Ahmed; Mark Taylor; Uni Park; Nicholas Campbell; Jon De Leon; Thom Allison; Kate Corbett
- Composer: Tom Third
- Country of origin: Canada
- Original language: English
- No. of seasons: 4
- No. of episodes: 38

Production
- Executive producers: Adrienne Mitchell; Morwyn Brebner; Brett Burlock; Peter Emerson; Jonas Prupas; Sean Reycraft (S2–4); Noelle Carbone (S3–4); Suzanne Colvin-Goulding (S3–4); Aren Prupas (S4); Serinda Swan (S4)
- Producer: Suzanne Colvin-Goulding
- Cinematography: Samy Inayeh
- Running time: 42 minutes
- Production companies: Muse Entertainment; Back Alley Films

Original release
- Network: CBC
- Release: 7 January 2019 – 7 April 2022

Coroner is a Canadian police procedural crime drama television series. Developed by Morwyn Brebner, the series is based on the Jenny Cooper crime novels by M. R. Hall. Serinda Swan stars as coroner Jenny Cooper. Coroner premiered on CBC on 7 January 2019.

== Overview ==
The series stars Serinda Swan as Jenny Cooper, a recently widowed coroner in Toronto who investigates suspicious deaths.

== Cast and characters ==
=== Main ===
- Serinda Swan as Dr. Jenny Cooper, a former ER doctor now working as a coroner in Toronto, Jenny is dealing with PTSD from the abrupt death of her husband, Dr. David Kalighi, from an aneurysm. Several months after his death, she discovers that he had a heavy gambling problem, leaving significant debts that force Jenny to sell their home and move out of the city.
- Roger Cross as Det. Donovan "Mac" McAvoy, a senior homicide detective who works alongside Jenny investigating various suspicious deaths, meeting her for the first time in the premiere episode. Though somewhat jaded, he is open to many of the theories and conclusions Jenny makes during investigations, and is willing to back her up if she brings enough evidence.
- Ehren Kassam as Ross Kalighi, Jenny's gay teenage son, who is grieving the loss of his father, but dealing with resentment for him as well. A promising athlete on his school swim team, Ross steps away from the sport because of his father's death and tries to find himself again.
- Éric Bruneau as Liam Bouchard (seasons 1–3; guest season 4), a veteran of the Canadian Armed Forces whom Jenny meets during an onsite investigation. He works as a handyman. After a one-night stand, they slowly build a supportive friendship after she hires him to make repairs around her new home. Due to limited finances, he resides in a treehouse, 'off the grid' in the woods.
- Tamara Podemski (Note: Podemski was credited as part of the main cast during her sole appearance in the third season.) as Alison Trent (seasons 1–3)
- Saad Siddiqui as Dr. Neil Sharma (seasons 1–3)
- Lovell Adams-Gray as Dr. Dwayne Allen (season 1; guest season 2)
- Kiley May as River Baitz (seasons 2–4; recurring season 1)
- Andy McQueen as Det. Malik Abed (seasons 1-4)
- Jennifer Dale as Peggy Cooper (seasons 3–4), Jenny's mother and Gordon's wife
- Shawn Ahmed as Alphonse Usmani (seasons 3–4)
- Mark Taylor as Clark Coleman (seasons 3–4)
- Uni Park as Dr. Melanie Lum-Davis (season 3)
- Nicholas Campbell as Gordon Cooper (season 4; recurring seasons 1–3)
- Jon De Leon as Dennis Garcia (season 4; recurring season 3)
- Thom Allison as Dr. Elijah Thompson (season 4)
- Kate Corbett as Cassidy James (season 4)

=== Recurring ===
- Alli Chung as Det. Taylor Kim (season 1)
- Graeme Jokic as Matteo (seasons 1–3)
- Oluniké Adeliyi as Noor Armias (season 2)
- Nicola Correia-Damude as Kelly Hart (season 2)
- Jonathan Tan as Dr. Luca Cheng (seasons 3–4)
- Sarah Podemski as Kirima Rite (seasons 3–4)

== Production and development ==
Coroner was developed for television by Morwyn Brebner from M. R. Hall's series of crime novels, and produced by Muse Entertainment, Back Alley Film Productions, and Cineflix Studios, with Adrienne Mitchell as executive producer and lead director.

The first season consists of eight episodes. Following the finale of the first season, CBC renewed Coroner for an eight-episode second season on 25 March 2019. The third season was announced on 26 May 2020, and premiered on 3 February 2021.

On 2 June 2021, CBC announced the series had been renewed for a fourth season. Production began on the 12-episode fourth season in July 2021, and in November it was announced that the fourth season was scheduled to premiere on 6 January 2022.

In June 2022, Sally Catto, CBC General Manager, announced that Serinda Swan had decided to leave the series, and options were being discussed with its producers.

== Series overview ==
Season	Episodes	Originally released	
Season	Episodes	First released	Last released
1	8	7 January 2019	25 February 2019
2	8	6 January 2020	24 February 2020
3	10	3 February 2021	7 April 2021
4	12	6 January 2022	7 April 2022

=== Season 1 (2019) ===
No. overall	No. in season	Title	Directed by	Written by	Original release date	Prod. code	Canada viewers (millions)
1	1	"Black Dog"	Adrienne Mitchell	Morwyn Brebner	7 January 2019	351416-1	1.05
Dr. Jenny Cooper leaves an ER position to become a coroner after the unexpected death of her husband. She and her son continue to struggle with the loss. As her new career starts, she investigates two deaths in a co-ed borstal with Detective McAvoy. She has visions of a black dog while investigating crime scenes and seeks advice from her therapist.
2	2	"Bunny"	Adrienne Mitchell	Waneta Storms	14 January 2019	351416-2	1.02
After discovering that her husband gambled away all their savings and left her deeply in debt, Jenny moves from her heavily mortgaged house in the city to a house in the country in need of extensive repair. She meets Liam, a handyman and military veteran who lives off the grid in a tree house. When a death occurs in a private sex club, Jenny and McAvoy investigate.
3	3	"Scattered"	Adrienne Mitchell	Sean Reycraft	21 January 2019	351416-3	0.95
A dismembered body prompts an investigation that may indicate a serial killer. Ross continues to have difficulty adjusting to the changes in his life. Jenny succumbs to her loneliness and has sex with Liam.
4	4	"Quick or Dead"	Adrienne Mitchell	Morwyn Brebner & Wendy Motion Brathwaite	28 January 2019	351416-4	1.00
Jenny and Mac find a frozen body. Liam strikes up a friendship with Ross, unaware that he is Jenny's son. Jenny bonds with a suspect's girlfriend.
5	5	"All's Well"	Winnifred Jong	Noelle Carbone	4 February 2019	351416-5	1.05
Jenny faces backlash from her public announcement that her predecessor made errors of procedure, and is deluged by attorneys filing appeals for murder convictions. When her water supply fails, Liam and Jenny discover a corpse in her well. Ross discovers that Jenny and Liam are lovers and moves out. Jenny has a severe panic attack when a flashback reveals the black dog was her family's dog when she was a child, and is linked to her sister's death.
6	6	"Confetti Heart"	Sherren Lee	Seneca Aaron	11 February 2019	351416-6	1.10
Jenny holds inquests for cases of police shootings. One of them involves someone Mac was close to in his youth.
7	7	"The Suburbs"	Paul Fox	Noelle Carbone & Seneca Aaron	18 February 2019	351416-7	N/A
Jenny investigates a death that results in radiation exposure for the team, and Jenny goes into isolation.
8	8	"Bridges"	Paul Fox	Morwyn Brebner & Nathalie Younglai	25 February 2019	351416-8	1.11
Jenny is injured as she and Mac solve a case, and she finally accepts the truth about her sister's death.

=== Season 2 (2020) ===
No. overall	No. in season	Title	Directed by	Written by	Original release date	Prod. code	Canada viewers (millions)
9	1	"Fire"	Adrienne Mitchell	Morwyn Brebner	6 January 2020	351416-9	N/A
Jenny has to solve a missing infant case while investigating a fatal fire.
10	2	"Borders"	Adrienne Mitchell	Wendy Motion Brathwaite	13 January 2020	351416-14	0.96
A body found in a road leads the team to be searching for the manner of death. Liam officially moves in to Jenny's house.
11	3	"Crispr Sistr"	Winnifred Jong	Nathalie Younglai	20 January 2020	351416-15	N/A
Jenny continues to sleep walk. An investigation lead them to a DNA laboratory.
12	4	"Unburied"	Winnifred Jong	Sean Reycraft	27 January 2020	351416-11	N/A
The death of a real estate broker is investigated. Jenny's father's mental status continues to decline.
13	5	"One Drum"	Charles Officer	Shannon Masters	3 February 2020	351416-16	N/A
A mass shooting at a church occurs and Jenny and Donovan have to put together the pieces to determine who was the shooter and who was a victim.
14	6	"The Flipside"	Charles Officer	Seneca Aaron	10 February 2020	351416-13	N/A
15	7	"Monster in the House"	Adrienne Mitchell	Noelle Carbone	17 February 2020	351416-12	N/A
16	8	"Fire, Part 2"	Adrienne Mitchell	Morwyn Brebner	24 February 2020	351416-10	N/A

=== Season 3 (2021) ===
No. overall	No. in season	Title	Directed by	Written by	Original release date	Prod. code	Canada viewers (millions)
17	1	"Bobby"	Adrienne Mitchell	Morwyn Brebner	3 February 2021	351416-26	N/A
Season 3 begins during COVID, and Jenny has to investigate cases related to it.
18	2	"In Bloom"	Adrienne Mitchell	Marsha Greene	10 February 2021	351416-25	N/A
Jenny contemplates reuniting with Liam. Donovan faces a difficult diagnosis. A death associated with a wellness retreat becomes a coroner case.
19	3	"Spirits"	Charles Officer	Chris Roberts	17 February 2021	351416-21	N/A
A man died in a house reputed to be haunted.
20	4	"Eyes Up"	Charles Officer	Wendy Motion Brathwaite	24 February 2021	351416-20	0.81
Donovan meets an artist who is attracted to him. He and Jenny try to solve a case where a girl seems to have lost her parents. Jenny goes to meet Liam after a long separation expecting a reunion and instead he tells her he is involved with another woman.
21	5	"Back to the Future"	Gloria Ui Young Kim & Liz Farrer	Noelle Carbone & Leah Cameron	3 March 2021	351416-19	N/A
Jenny and Donovan get involved in an investigation that deals with witchcraft.
22	6	"No Justice, No Peace"	Gloria Ui Young Kim	Nathalie Younglai	10 March 2021	351416-24	N/A
Ross attempts to revive a fallen man and becomes entangled in the investigation of his death.
23	7	"Round and Round"	Samir Rehem	Shannon Masters	17 March 2021	351416-23	N/A
Jenny investigates and apparent drug OD. Donovan delays his care and starts to suffer for it. After Jenny has a fling with a police detective, Ian returns and says he was wrong and wants to return.
24	8	"Blue Flock"	Samir Rehem	Seneca Aaron	24 March 2021	351416-22	N/A
Donovan and Jenny investigate a death of a wealthy man who wanted to be cryogenically frozen after death.
25	9	"Christmas Eve"	Adrienne Mitchell	Noelle Carbone	31 March 2021	351416-18	N/A
A couple are brutally murdered on christmas eve, and their son becomes a suspect.
26	10	"Christmas Day"	Adrienne Mitchell	Morwyn Brebner	7 April 2021	351416-17	N/A
Donovan and Jenny continue to try to catch the killer of the couple that were murdered.

=== Season 4 (2022) ===
No. overall	No. in season	Title	Directed by	Written by	Original release date	Prod. code	Canada viewers (millions)
27	1	"Emerge"	Ruba Nadda	Adriana Maggs	6 January 2022	351416-27	N/A
The office has a new coroner while Jenny takes a leave of absence. Donovan is doing well post surgery.
28	2	"Cutting Coroners"	Ruba Nadda	Shannon Masters	13 January 2022	351416-28	N/A
Jenny rejoined the coroner's office early, along side her replacement. They get a multi-victim car accident on their first case together.
29	3	"Neighbourhood Watch"	Farhad Mann	Nathalie Younglai	20 January 2022	351416-29	N/A
Donovan seems on edge and breaks it off with his girlfriend. A number of body parts are discovered.
30	4	"Heartbeet"	Samir Rehem	Laura Good	27 January 2022	351416-30	N/A
the team investigates the death of a child. Donovan's ex-wife, Cassidy, is a social worker that works on the case.
31	5	"Degargoony"	Farhad Mann	Noelle Carbone & Mazi Khalighi	24 February 2022	351416-31	N/A
A body is found in a shallow grave in an immigrant community.
32	6	"Young Legend"	Serinda Swan	Motion	3 March 2022	351416-32	N/A
A rising basketball star is found dead. Jenny has to testify in a preliminary trial of Liam's killer. Jenny decides to make an effort to get closer to her mom.
33	7	"True Crime"	Liz Farrer	JP Larocque	10 March 2022	351416-33	N/A
The team investigates a scene where a body was found and presumed to have jumped off a bridge, but all is not what it seems. Jenny's father lost all their combined savings in a scam.
34	8	"LJND"	Adrienne Mitchell	Nathalie Younglai & Lindsey Addawoo	17 March 2022	351416-34	N/A
Cassidy attends a retreat for the survivor's group she is involved with. Donovan attends with her when there are suspicious links to some cases of suicide.
35	9	"Our Home on Native Land"	Corey Bowles	Shannon Masters	24 March 2022	351416-35	N/A
A near naked body is found near a homeless encampment.
37	10	"Safe Space"	Corey Bowles	Seneca Aaron	31 March 2022	351416-36	N/A
River and Dennis decide to move in together and the elevator in their apartment harbors a concrete base complete with a dead body. In the aftermath of Gordon's death, Peggy goes missing.
37	11	"Blast to the Past"	Samir Rehem	Noelle Carbone	7 April 2022	351416-37	N/A
Peggy's flower shop is blown up, and a body is found.
38	12	"Death Goes On"	Samir Rehem	Adriana Maggs	7 April 2022	351416-38	N/A
Jenny Finds Peggy and after a short hospitalization, she returns home. This is the series finale.

== Release ==
Coroner premiered on CBC on 7 January 2019, and attracted more than 1 million viewers per episode throughout the first season. The series was subsequently renewed for a second season. Season 2 premiered on 6 January 2020; followed by Season 3 on February 3, 2021. The fourth season premiered on 6 January 2022.

In September 2018, Cineflix Rights acquired the global distribution rights to Coroner.

In October 2018, NBCUniversal International Networks acquired Coroner from Cineflix Rights for their channels in the UK, Germany, France, Spain, Poland, Africa, Latin America, Brazil and Australia.

Season 1 premiered in the United Kingdom on Universal TV on 21 January 2019. Cineflix announced that the broadcast of Coroner in the UK was Universal TV's strongest ever series launch. After the shut down of Universal TV in January 2020 with the takeover of Sky Group by Comcast and the subsequent merger of operations, Season 2 premiered in the UK on Sky Witness on 29 July 2020. Season 3 premiered on 22 February 2021.

UK's Channel 4 acquired the first and second seasons in May 2020 and began broadcasting the series on the More4 channel on 6 May 2021.

In the United States, The CW acquired the broadcast rights to the series in June 2020. Coroner premiered in the U.S. on 5 August 2020. Season 2 premiered on 7 October 2020. Season 3 premiered on 19 August 2021. Season 4 premiered on 2 October 2022.
