= Loving You (2003 film) =

- Genre: Crime drama
- Created by: Margaret Leroy
- Written by: Matthew Hall
- Directed by: Jean Stewart
- Starring: Niamh Cusack; Douglas Henshall; Marianne Jean-Baptiste; Keith Allen; Marian McLoughlin; Mark Bonnar; Paterson Joseph; Jennifer Hennessy
- Composer: Nicholas Hooper
- Country of origin: United Kingdom
- Original language: English
- No. of episodes: 1

Production
- Executive producer: Hugh Warren
- Producer: Margaret Enefer
- Cinematography: Cinders Forshaw
- Editor: Ardan Fisher
- Running time: 90 minutes
- Production company: Granada Television

Original release
- Network: ITV
- Release: 24 February 2003

Loving You (also known as The Rainbow Room) is a British television crime drama film, based upon the novel Trust by Margaret Leroy, first broadcast on ITV on 24 February 2003. The film was adapted from the novel by writer Matthew Hall and was directed by Jean Stewart. The film stars Niamh Cusack as Chloe, a divorced schoolteacher who falls in love with educational psychologist Dan (Douglas Henshall), only to be left heartbroken when the police arrest Dan on suspicion of sexually abusing a six-year-old that he has been assessing. Chloe is forced to confront the possibility that Dan may have also sexually abused her two daughters, Alice (Ophelia Lovibond) and Lucy (Maisie Preston).

Additional cast members for the film include Keith Allen, who plays Chloe's ex-husband Adam, and Marian McLoughlin and Mark Bonnar, who play the officers investigating Dan, DS Vicky Griggs and DC Colin Morris. The film was broadcast in Finland in July 2004, and in Brazil under the title Verdade Sob Suspeita. Margaret Leroy praised Matthew Hall's adaptation, writing; "I was delighted when Granada bought the television rights to Trust. During filming I spent a day on set. It was fascinating to see how my story had grown from a tiny seed of an idea into this project involving so many people - and it was quite a thrill to walk round the set and see the rooms of Chloe's house exactly as I'd imagined them." The film attracted an audience of 7.41 million viewers in the 9:00pm slot. Notably, the film has never been repeated, nor released on DVD.

== Cast ==
- Niamh Cusack as Chloe
- Douglas Henshall as Dan
- Marianne Jean-Baptiste as Jude
- Keith Allen as Adam
- Marian McLoughlin as DS Vicky Griggs
- Mark Bonnar as DC Colin Morris
- Paterson Joseph as Felix Fisher
- Jennifer Hennessy as Mrs. Smithson
- Alan McKenna as John
- Ophelia Lovibond as Alice
- Maisie Preston as Lucy
- Jean Marie Coffey as Sue
- Ashley Clish as Jessica
- Lauren Reid as Charlene
- Emily May Sissons as Carly
- Steven Webb as Justin
- Polly Kemp as Social Worker
- Charles De'Ath as Prosecutor
- Jerome Willis as Magistrate
