= The Coroner (novel) =

2009 novel by M.R. Hall

First edition

The Coroner is M.R. Hall's first novel. It was published by PanMacmillan in 2009, and became the first in a series based around the fictional Jenny Cooper, a former solicitor appointed as coroner in the 'Severn Vale District' (effectively Bristol, England).

== Subsequent Jenny Cooper novels ==
His second novel, The Disappeared, was published in January 2010 in the UK and in December 2009 in the US. The Coroner was shortlisted for the Crime Writers' Association Gold Dagger awarded to the best crime novel of 2009. His third novel, The Redeemed, was published by PanMacmillan in April 2011. His fourth novel, The Flight, was shortlisted for the Crime Writers' Association Gold Dagger in 2012.

== The Jenny Cooper novels ==
1. The Coroner (2009)
In which we meet Jenny Cooper, new holder of the eponymous title in 'Severn Vale District', and survivor of a recent divorce. Her hopes of calm in her new post -during which she might recover- are progressively eroded by a series of events. These include the discovery of files regarding cases which seem to warrant further investigation, secreted in her newly inherited office by her predecessor.
2. The Disappeared (2009)
3. The Redeemed (2011)
4. The Flight (2012)
5. The Chosen Dead (2013)
6. The Burning (2014)
7. A Life To Kill (2017)
8. The Innocent (2012) (Short story)

== Adaptations ==
The Canadian drama television series Coroner is based on the Jenny Cooper series of novels. It began airing in January 2019. A second series was shown in 2020 and a third was broadcast in Canada in early 2021, to follow on The CW television network in the US later that year. It ran for four seasons, until 2022.
