= List of Judge John Deed episodes =

The British courtroom drama television series Judge John Deed, starring Martin Shaw as a maverick High Court judge, began with a pilot episode called "Exacting Justice", which was first broadcast on BBC One on 9 January 2001. The series proper began on 26 November 2001. The first to third series contained four 90-minute episodes, the fourth and fifth were extended to a six-episode run and the latest series comprised two 120-minute episodes split into two parts on broadcast. When it began, the programme followed an episodic format, though later series have developed a serialised format, with plots developing over a number of stories.

As of the end of the sixth series in 2007, the number of episodes is 29. The possibility of more episodes was in doubt after Shaw became involved in other projects, and the series had been officially cancelled by the BBC by 2009. The pilot and all 6 series have been released on DVD in the UK (minus episodes 24 & 25). The pilot and first series were released in North America in March 2010.

== Series overview ==
Series	Episodes	Originally released	
Series	Episodes	First released	Last released
1	5	9 January 2001	17 December 2001
2	4	21 November 2002	19 December 2002
3	4	27 November 2003	26 January 2004
4	6	13 January 2005	17 February 2005
5	6	6 January 2006	10 February 2006
6	4	9 January 2007	18 January 2007

== Episodes ==
=== Series 1 (2001) ===
No. overall	No. in series	Title	Directed by	Written by	Original release date	UK viewers (millions)
1	1	"Exacting Justice"	Alrick Riley	G.F. Newman	9 January 2001	6.6
Judge John Deed takes the case of Maurice Haart, a father accused of murdering the man who killed his daughter. Haart tells his barrister, Jo Mills, that he shot the man because he saw him driving the same lorry that he hit his daughter with, but he refuses to plead provocation. Deed's daughter Charlie introduces him to Rory, an environmental activist, and they are later arrested when they destroy GM crops.
2	2	"Rough Justice"	Mary McMurray	G.F. Newman	26 November 2001	9.1
An MI5 informant is on trial for causing grievous bodily harm to his wife and Deed is pressured by the Lord Chancellor's Department and Police Commissioner Row Colemore to release the man, but Deed refuses without investigating the matter further. He conducts a Newton hearing, hearing evidence and acting as his own jury. This causes a clash with Sir Ian Rochester of the LCD (with whose wife Deed is having an affair). Deed also sits on the case of date rape against three men.
3	3	"Duty of Care"	Jonny Campbell	G.F. Newman	3 December 2001	7.4
Corporate manslaughter charges are brought against the managing director of a construction company whose health and safety breaches result in a worker being killed on a building site. Charlie steals a dog from an animal testing laboratory and leaves her with Deed for safety, but there is trouble when it is found. Deed has to contend with Rochester's urges for him to drop the manslaughter case because of the defendant's political affiliations, as well as with George's contempt in the courtroom.
4	4	"Appropriate Response"	Jane Powell	G.F. Newman	10 December 2001	7.1
Romero, a serial rapist and former defendant in Deed's court, is released from prison and seeks revenge on the judge. Deed makes an enemy of the police when he tries two police officers for GBH and refuses bail when he suspects tampering with the main witness. Romero poisons Rosie and leads Deed to an abandoned warehouse, under the pretence he has kidnapped Charlie, enraging the judge. Deed's actions force him to reassess the actions of a boxer on trial for GBH, and his relationship with Jo is strained at a reception.
5	5	"Hidden Agenda"	Jane Powell	G.F. Newman	17 December 2001	7.1
A GP stands trial for the murder of a patient when it is revealed he left everything to her in his will. Though the jury finds her not guilty, the doctor insists to Deed that she did kill her patient, despite an expert witness stating that was not possible. The Lord Chancellor's Department continues surveillance of Deed when it suspects he is having an affair with the doctor. Meanwhile, Charlie becomes involved in the case of an HIV-positive mother who refuses to have her child tested, and seeks her father's help in the matter.

=== Series 2 (2002) ===
No. overall	No. in series	Title	Directed by	Written by	Original release date	UK viewers (millions)
6	1	"Political Expediency"	Jonny Campbell	G.F. Newman	21 November 2002	5.7
Deed is forced to negotiate a political crisis when the driver of an Arab sheikh, in Britain with a £10 billion aeroplane contract, is charged with the murder of a prostitute. Prosecution counsel is murdered, witnesses and the jury are tampered with, and Deed suspects the Sheikh's involvement in the crime is greater than previously assumed. He discovers that George is marrying the Trade Secretary, and Rochester offers him a seat on the Appellate Bench in an effort to exonerate the British government. Meanwhile Deed enrages Jo Mills by ignoring her arguments and giving a star footballer she is defending a prison sentence.
7	2	"Abuse of Power"	David Kew	G.F. Newman	28 November 2002	6.2
A mentally disabled man confesses to the murder of a young woman, but retracts his confession, leaving Deed perplexed. When Robert Hume takes a fraud case from Deed, Deed suspects his peer is involved and, despite the efforts of Channing and Rochester to dissuade him, decides to investigate further. As Deed's investigations run deeper, people close to him are drawn in, and even when his suspicions are confirmed, there is nothing Rochester is willing to do. Meanwhile, Jo begins a romantic relationship with Row Colemore.
8	3	"Nobody's Fool"	Jonny Campbell	G.F. Newman	12 December 2002	6
Francesca Rochester returns to Deed's life, asking for his help in getting her Aunt sectioned so she can take over her successful publishing company. Charlie reveals to her father that she is pregnant, though Deed is oblivious to his daughter's feelings and she later terminates the pregnancy after talking to George. After a talk with Jo, Deed realises what he is getting himself into and discovers the truth behind Francesca's new business venture. Meanwhile, a promising young lawyer represents himself in a trial over the murder of his parents. During this episode, Deed refers to "Wellington's famous dictum" presumably "Publish and be damned".
9	4	"Everyone's Child"	Andy Hay	G.F. Newman	19 December 2002	5.2
Jo defends a young boy who wants attempts to give him a heart transplant blocked and Deed puts an injunction on the operation. After a plea from the boy's parents he lifts it, but the boy dies during surgery. Jo is furious at Deed and they argue, but later spend the night at his lodgings. Rochester uses this to try to dismantle Deed's career through Jo. Elsewhere Deed is trying the case of two drug addicts charged with murder and Charlie is involved in a protest in support of a hunger striker appealing against his conviction.

=== Series 3 (2003–04) ===
No. overall	No. in series	Title	Directed by	Written by	Original release date	UK viewers (millions)
10	1	"Health Hazard"	Andy Hay	G.F. Newman	27 November 2003	6.6
Deed is given a high-profile case in which a woman takes action against a mobile phone company for causing her brain tumour, angering Ian Rochester. Rochester attempts to take the case away from Deed, but is unable to. Instead he brings Jo up for a disciplinary after her affair with Deed. Deed arrives at her hearing, chaired by Sir Monty Everard, and has the charges dropped. Meanwhile, a man involved in a hit and run incident might be unfit to stand trial.
11	2	"Judicial Review"	Andy Hay	G.F. Newman	4 December 2003	6.5
Deed accuses Everard of corruption when he grants a non-custodial sentence to a defendant with political ties (the hit and run driver in "Health Hazard"), at the same time putting Jo's career on the line. She convinces Deed to see a therapist and he meets with Rachel Crawcheck. However, he continues to seek real justice until the sentence is appealed. Deed also hears a mysterious case involving a woman who claims she killed her husband in self defence.
12	3	"Conspiracy"	David Kerr	G.F. Newman	11 December 2003	6.6
An MP stands accused of attempted murder but there is a belief by Colemore that the charge has been contrived to silence his investigation into deaths in the arms industry. Deed discovers that Colemore is involved in a plot to acquit the MP for commercial reasons, leading Deed to charge him for perverting the course of justice. Deed and Rachel take his therapy to the bedroom.
13	4	"Economic Imperative"	David Kerr	G.F. Newman	26 January 2004	6.2
Diana Hulsey (from "Health Hazard") takes her case against the mobile phone company forwards and asks Jo to adopt her son when she dies. Rochester and the Trade Secretary try to derail the case by planting child pornography on Deed's computer, leading the phone company not to settle after Diana dies and leaving Deed with a race to save his name.

=== Series 4 (2005) ===
No. overall	No. in series	Title	Directed by	Written by	Original release date	UK viewers (millions)
14	1	"Lost and Found"	G.F. Newman	G.F. Newman	13 January 2005	5.5
A man accused of participating in an armed robbery is re-apprehended after 16 years on the run. The case against him is weakened by evidence of corruption in the arresting squad, and an unreliable and anonymous professional informant. Jo's first meetings with Michael get off to a shaky start as she tries to juggle her career and her commitments to the boy.
15	2	"Above the Law"	Deborah Paige	G.F. Newman	20 January 2005	5.8
Friends and family of three gang members accused of murdering a rival drug dealer terrorise jurors and kill witnesses. As the case nears abandonment, Deed is forced to consider the heretofore unconstitutional option of a juryless trial. After an initial refusal, Jo fights for, and wins, a second chance to adopt Michael.
16	3	"In Defence of Others"	Tristram Powell	G.F. Newman	27 January 2005	6.4
A never-successfully-convicted child sex abuser is killed while in prison, and the accused claims a defence of preventing future abuses. Jo meets Michael's real father, who wants to return to South Africa with her. Everard hears the case of an adopted child who raped his teacher. Deed risks his career by sleeping with a claimant.
17	4	"Defence of the Realm"	Steve Kelly	G.F. Newman	3 February 2005	5.8
Deed's affair comes back to bite him as the Home Office pressures for his resignation or impeachment; he is temporarily exiled to lecture at a university. Jo sits as a Recorder in a fraud case concerning a defence contractor, and, facing threats against herself and Michael, finds a trail of corruption leading to the higher echelons of government.
18	5	"Separation of Powers"	Deborah Paige	G.F. Newman	10 February 2005	7.4
Deed hears the case (pretrialed in "Defence of the Realm") of birth defects near a waste disposal plant. A PR company spinning the reports from the waste disposal company has connections with both the defence contractor and the Home Secretary, and the defendant from the fraud case provides compelling – and disastrous – evidence.
19	6	"Popular Appeal"	Steve Kelly	G.F. Newman	17 February 2005	6.1
A desirable case concerning an on-screen death on a reality television series is mysteriously allocated to Deed, which leads to a clash with the press. Haughton faces a select committee to answer charges of corruption, and Jo pays the price for Deed's crusade. Deed finally confronts the man behind Jo's kidnapping.

=== Series 5 (2006) ===
No. overall	No. in series	Title	Directed by	Written by	Original release date	UK viewers (millions)
20	1	"Hard-Gating"	Steve Kelly	G.F. Newman	6 January 2006	6.8
A black prisoner is killed by his white cellmate, who is a known racist and although the Prison Service claims they shared as a result of overcrowding, Deed suspects that they simply weren't up to the task. Jo's relationship with Deed grows further apart when Marc returns.
21	2	"My Daughter, Right or Wrong"	Tristram Powell	G.F. Newman	13 January 2006	6.3
An animal rights activist stands trial for the murder of a scientist when his organisation firebombs Sussex University. He sacks his QC and asks Charlie, the junior, to represent him. She takes the case despite her father's objections, which is good news for Rochester. Jo resumes her relationship with Marc.
22	3	"Lost Youth"	Tristram Powell	G.F. Newman	20 January 2006	6.2
Deed sits on a case after Marc tells two parents that it would be in their son's best interests if they did not resuscitate him again, due to his comatose state. Marc's recommendation is challenged by the boy's God-fearing parents, who believe it is not for them to decide whether he lives or dies. Deed learns that Jo and Marc intend to marry. Meanwhile, Deed has to live with the consequences after a boy commits suicide less than 48 hours after he is sentenced by Deed to a two year custodial sentence under the Home Secretary's automatic custodial sentencing guidelines.
23	4	"Silent Killer"	Darcia Martin	G.F. Newman	27 January 2006	5.8
A couple suffering from motor-neuron disease and cancer sue their local council, believing their condition has been caused by a communications antenna, used by the police, on the roof of their flat. The wife of an Iraqi minister approaches Deed, wishing to sue the British government because the use of depleted uranium by the army in Iraq has caused the deaths of members of her family. Meanwhile, Jo and Marc have set a date for their wedding, adding to the tension between Jo and John.
24	5	"One Angry Man"	Darcia Martin	G.F. Newman	3 February 2006	7.3
Rochester sees to it that Deed is brought up for jury service, and he is called to a murder trial in which a Ukrainian nanny is suspected of shaking a baby in her care to death. Deed learns that the baby's death might have been caused by complications with the MMR vaccine. Jo has doubts about marrying Marc when he is asked to return to South Africa, and she falls back into Deed's arms. This episode, along with "Heart of Darkness", was excluded from the recent DVD release due to subsequent revelations casting doubt on the dangers of MMR vaccines, making the episodes appear unreliable.
25	6	"Heart of Darkness"	G.F. Newman	G.F. Newman	10 February 2006	6.5
Deed hears a case that could have potentially disastrous effects for the government's support of the MMR vaccine. Jo forgets to go to her wedding rehearsal and is furious when Deed schedules a meeting on the morning of the ceremony. This episode, along with "One Angry Man", was excluded from the recent DVD release due to subsequent revelations casting doubt on the dangers of MMR vaccines, making the episodes appear unreliable.

=== Series 6 (2007) ===
No. overall	No. in series	Title	Directed by	Written by	Original release date	UK viewers (millions)
26	1	"War Crimes – Part 1"	Steve Kelly	G.F. Newman	9 January 2007	6.2
Deed sits in The Hague to hear the case of a British soldier who killed 11 Iraqi civilians and is being accused of war crimes. A previous ruling Deed made against a British National Party councillor angers Muslim extremists, and a female assassin is sent to kill Deed.
27	2	"War Crimes – Part 2"	Steve Kelly	G.F. Newman	11 January 2007	5.8
During the War Crimes case in The Hague, Deed learns that the British Soldier on trial is being sacrificed as part of the government's overall exit strategy. Deed's dilemma is one possible miscarriage of justice to save the lives of many soldiers.
28	3	"Evidence of Harm – Part 1"	Darcia Martin	G.F. Newman	16 January 2007	6.2
Jo asks Deed to review the withdrawal of legal aid for a soldier who was damaged by vaccines given to him by the army and who later committed suicide. Deed is reluctant since the case has been heard and closed by another judge. He accuses the judge of bias and risks causing a constitutional crisis in order to get justice for the soldier's family.
29	4	"Evidence of Harm – Part 2"	Darcia Martin	G.F. Newman	18 January 2007	6.3
As Deed delves deeper and deeper into why funding for the soldier to sue the pharmaceutical company was withdrawn, he makes more and more sinister discoveries. It is then that the forces of reaction move against him to stop him any way they can.

== Broadcast history ==
Series	Day	Timeslot	Additional broadcast information
Pilot	Tuesday	8–9.30 p.m.	None
1	Tuesday	8–9.30 p.m.	None
2	Thursday	8.30–10 p.m.	"Everyone's Child" aired from 8 p.m.
3	Thursday	8.30–10 p.m.	"Economic Imperative" aired on a Monday
4	Thursday	8–9.30 p.m.	None
5	Friday	8.30–10 p.m.	None
6	Tuesday and Thursday	9–10 p.m.	None

== Notes and references ==
- "Judge John Deed episode guide". bbc.co.uk
