= Kiley May =

Canadian Hotinonhshón:ni Mohawk actor, writer and educator (born 1986/7)

- Born: 1986 or 1987 (age 39–40); Six Nations of the Grand River, Ontario, Canada
- Education: Ryerson University
- Occupations: Storyteller, actor, filmmaker, two-spirit activist

Kiley May (born 1986/1987) is a Mohawk and Cayuga storyteller, actor, screenwriter, filmmaker, and two-spirit activist in Toronto.

== Early life and career ==
As a child, May lived at Six Nations of the Grand River, an Indian reserve in Ontario. Her (Note: May uses she/her and they/them pronouns. This article uses feminine pronouns for consistency.) mother is Mohawk and her father is Cayuga, and she belongs to the Turtle Clan.

She was assigned male at birth, but was feminine as a child. She experienced discrimination as a result of transphobia and homophobia, but had been protected by her family from their community's bigotry.

In 2007, May left the reserve and moved to Toronto, where she attended photojournalism at Ryerson University. While in school, she discovered the love for creative writing and storytelling, but after graduating she did not write for several years. She recently started writing for outlets like Vice and HuffPost.

In 2017, May was the Youth Ambassador for Pride Toronto. She also works to create spaces for two-spirited people in Indigenous longhouses. She was additionally crowdfunding to pay for travel to Montreal for gender-affirming surgery.

In 2020, May was a winner of the Magee TV Diverse Screenwriters Award from the Toronto Screenwriting Conference. She also had her short film, Disclosure, premiered at the ImagineNATIVE Film and Media Arts Festival on October that same year and released in 2021.

== Personal life ==
May initially identified as genderqueer and gender non-conforming, and eventually started to use she/her pronouns. At the age 30, she was using both she/her and they/them pronouns, and has since identifies as two-spirit, as well as being queer and transgender.

She described herself as having a "kaleidoscope identity" after her experience in transitioning and finding herself, claiming that someone's gender identity and sexuality always changes like the colors inside of a kaleidoscope.

== Filmography ==
Year	Title	Role	Notes	Ref.
2017	Pink: Diss	Pynk	Short film by John Greyson	
2019	Coroner	River Baitz		
2019	It Chapter Two	Shokopiwah woman		
2020	The D Cut	Amanda		
2021	Disclosure	Libbie	Short film, also worked as producer and writer	
2021	Discretion	Libbie	Short film, also worked as producer and writer	
2022	Soft	Patricia		
2025	Sheriff Country	Amber		
2026	Allegiance	Delilah St. James		
