= Trial & Retribution =

Television series

- Genre: Crime drama
- Created by: Lynda La Plante
- Starring: David Hayman; Victoria Smurfit; Kate Buffery; Dorian Lough; Barbara Thorn; Inday Ba
- Country of origin: United Kingdom
- Original language: English
- No. of series: 12
- No. of episodes: 44

Production
- Executive producers: Lynda La Plante; Liz Thorburn
- Producers: Christopher Hall; Jolyon Symonds; Rayan Salvi
- Production location: United Kingdom
- Running time: 120 minutes (Series 1–7); 90 minutes (Series 8–10); 60 minutes (Series 11–12)
- Production company: La Plante Productions

Original release
- Network: ITV
- Release: 19 October 1997 – 13 February 2009

Trial & Retribution is a feature-length ITV police procedural television drama series that first aired on 19 October 1997. Written and devised by Lynda La Plante as a follow-on from her successful television series Prime Suspect, each episode was typically broadcast over two nights. David Hayman stars as the main protagonist of the series, DCS Michael "Mike" Walker. Throughout the series, he has two main sidekicks: DI Pat North (Kate Buffery) in Series 1–6 and DCI Róisín Connor (Victoria Smurfit) in Series 7–12.

The first seven series each contained two two-hour long episodes, covering one feature-length story. From series eight, the format was reduced to two 90-minute-long episodes. As of series ten, the format once again changed, incorporating multiple stories across one series. For the final two series, this format was retained; however, the length of the episodes was reduced to 60 minutes. The last episode was broadcast on 13 February 2009. The complete series was released on DVD on 14 July 2014.

== Production ==
Each episode makes frequent use of split screen scenes, with usually three images shown in one screen. Similar effects were frequently used in other series such as 24 and Spooks, and in later episodes of the ITV police series The Bill. The camera angles used in the split-screen configuration of Trial & Retribution tended to be used to present the situation from different perspectives, including the angle from the suspects, angle from behind and in front of the characters, angle from the crime-scene and/or angle from different sides of the town.

== Cast ==
- David Hayman as DCS Michael "Mike" Walker
- Kate Buffery as DI Pat North (Series 1–6)
- Victoria Smurfit as DCI Róisín Connor (Series 7–12) (as Victioria Smurfit in some episodes)
- Dorian Lough as DS David "Satch" Satchell
- Barbara Thorn as DS Barbara MacKenzie (Series 2–7)
- Inday Ba/Sarah Ozeke as DC Lisa West (Series 5–10)
- George Asprey as DC Jack Hutchens (Series 2–3)
- Paul Kynman as DS Jeff Batchley (Series 2–5)
- Sandra James-Young as DC Vivien Watkins (Series 3–5)
- James Simmons as DC Doug Collins (Series 4–6)
- Vince Leigh as DS Sam Palmer (Series 10–12)
- Richard Durden Dr. John Foster (Series 1–8)
- Gemma Jones as Dr. Jean Mullins (Series 7–12)
- Nicholas Blane as Derek Waugh, QC (Series 1–5)
- Corin Redgrave as Robert Rylands, QC (Series 1–6)
- David Fleeshman as Willis Fletcher, QC (Series 1–5)
- Simon Callow as Rupert Halliday, QC (Series 1–5)
- George Pensotti as Judge Winfield (Series 1–9)

== Series overview ==
Series	Episodes	Originally released	
Series	Episodes	First released	Last released
1	2	19 October 1997	20 October 1997
2	2	18 October 1998	19 October 1998
3	2	7 October 1999	14 October 1999
4	2	4 October 2000	5 October 2000
5	2	19 June 2002	20 June 2002
6	2	6 October 2002	7 October 2002
7	2	1 September 2003	2 September 2003
8	2	11 October 2004	12 October 2004
9	2	7 November 2005	8 November 2005
10	10	14 January 2007	13 February 2007
11	10	17 January 2008	27 March 2008
12	6	9 January 2009	13 February 2009

== Episodes ==
=== Series 1 (1997) ===
No. overall	No. in series	Title	Directed by	Written by	Original release date	Viewers (millions)
1	1	"Trial and Retribution (Part 1)"	Aisling Walsh	Lynda La Plante	19 October 1997	N/A
Five-year-old girl Julie Harris goes missing from home after being seen playing in the local playground. Suspicion immediately falls on Julie's mother's new boyfriend, Peter James (Lee Ross). But when her body is found inside a sewage pipe, evidence points towards local misfit Michael Dunn (Rhys Ifans).
2	2	"Trial and Retribution (Part 2)"	Aisling Walsh	Lynda La Plante	20 October 1997	N/A
When items relating to the case are found in Michael Dunn's flat, Walker has no doubt that Dunn is responsible for Julie's murder. However, when it is revealed that a frantic young officer who found Julie's body planted the evidence, Dunn's trial is thrown into jeopardy.

=== Series 2 (1998) ===
No. overall	No. in series	Title	Directed by	Written by	Original release date	Viewers (millions)
3	1	"Trial and Retribution II (Part 1)"	Aisling Walsh	Lynda La Plante	18 October 1998	8.50
When young mother Susan Harrow fails to return home after a night out, her mother reports her missing to the police. Her body is later found on wasteground near to where she disappeared. A second victim, Marilyn Spark (Linda Henry), is attacked by the same assailant; however, she manages to survive and is taken to hospital for treatment.
4	2	"Trial and Retribution II (Part 2)"	Aisling Walsh	Lynda La Plante	19 October 1998	9.00
As a third victim is found murdered, Marilyn soon identifies the man responsible as Damon Morton (Iain Glen), and Walker must gather evidence to secure his conviction. When Morton's accomplice confesses to murder, Walker is suspicious.

=== Series 3 (1999) ===
No. overall	No. in series	Title	Directed by	Written by	Original release date	Viewers (millions)
5	1	"Trial and Retribution III (Part 1)"	Jo Johnson	Lynda La Plante	7 October 1999	8.64
Fifteen-year-old Cassie Booth goes missing whilst doing her local paper round, and her blood-stained clothes are later found in a nearby boathouse during a police search. Walker is suspicious when the owner of the boathouse, Karl Wilding, has a dodgy alibi for the time of Cassie's disappearance.
6	2	"Trial and Retribution III (Part 2)"	Jo Johnson	Lynda La Plante	14 October 1999	8.72
Pat is forced to deal with a persistent complainer, Stephen Warrington (Richard E. Grant), who has been hounding the station. Pat becomes concerned when Warrington starts stalking her, but soon realises that there is a link between Warrington and Walker's murder case.

=== Series 4 (2000) ===
No. overall	No. in series	Title	Directed by	Written by	Original release date	Viewers (millions)
7	1	"Trial and Retribution IV (Part 1)"	Michael Whyte	Lynda La Plante	4 October 2000	6.87
Pat is asked to investigate a fifteen-year-old case in which Gary Meadows (Steven Hartley) was murdered by his boyfriend, James McCready (James Wilby), a case which was originally investigated by Mike. As the only witness to the murder was Meadows' young daughter, who was only seven-years-old at the time, she was unable to offer any kind of witness statement.
8	2	"Trial and Retribution IV (Part 2)"	Michael Whyte	Lynda La Plante	5 October 2000	6.93
Pat is forced to reinvestigate other lines of enquiry, while Mike finds himself trying to cover his own backside when evidence reveals that a psychic was used in an attempt to uncover evidence relating to the case.

=== Series 5 (2002) ===
Series five was originally recorded and due for broadcast in October 2001, continuing the regular yearly broadcasts in October. However, due to special programming regarding the September 11 attacks, the programme was removed from the schedule and was not rescheduled for broadcast until June 2002. Certain other territories, including Australia, still received the broadcast in 2001.

No. overall	No. in series	Title	Directed by	Written by	Original release date	Viewers (millions)
9	1	"Trial and Retribution V (Part 1)"	Aisling Walsh	Lynda La Plante	19 June 2002	7.31
Walker is assigned to investigate the discovery of a seventeen-year-old skeleton underneath the patio of a former bed and breakfast. Disillusioned with having to investigate such a case, he is especially angered by the fact that he has been paired with Pat's ex-boyfriend Jeff.
10	2	"Trial and Retribution V (Part 2)"	Aisling Walsh	Lynda La Plante	20 June 2002	6.58
When two further bodies and the skeleton of a premature baby are also found at the property, Kathleen Norton (Maggie McCarthy) is charged and sent for trial. However, Walker isn't entirely convinced that the alibi of former guest Graham Richards (Sean Chapman) is enough to keep him in the clear.

=== Series 6 (2002) ===
No. overall	No. in series	Title	Directed by	Written by	Original release date	Viewers (millions)
11	1	"Trial and Retribution VI (Part 1)"	Ferdinand Fairfax	Lynda La Plante	6 October 2002	6.10
Back on the murder squad, Pat is asked to investigate when a young mother of two, Diane Leach, is abducted from a local wood. The confession of a local sex offender complicates matters, as Pat looks into the possibility that the father of a young protégé of the woman may be responsible for her disappearance. Meanwhile, Walker has worries of his own, as his ex-wife Lyn is dating an abusive, unstable man, Eric Fowler (Tim McInnerny), who turns into a manic-obsessive when she decides to leave him.
12	2	"Trial and Retribution VI (Part 2)"	Ferdinand Fairfax	Lynda La Plante	7 October 2002	5.96
Mike decides to take matters into his own hands, resulting in Fowler's death.

=== Series 7 (2003) ===
No. overall	No. in series	Title	Directed by	Written by	Original release date	Viewers (millions)
13	1	"Suspicion (Part 1)"	Charles Beeson	Lynda La Plante	1 September 2003	7.30
A severed female hand is found in the outreaches of Thames, which brings Róisín into contact with her first boss Mike, who is now back in uniform after being found innocent at his murder trial. When a search fails to reveal the remainder of the body, a missing persons case which Mike has been personally asked to look at reveals the possible identity of the victim.
14	2	"Suspicion (Part 2)"	Charles Beeson	Lynda La Plante	2 September 2003	6.13
When the au pair Carla Worth (Neve McIntosh) is found to have been posing as the dead victim to fool friends and neighbours, the victim's husband Greg (Charles Dance) is suspected of the victim's murder.

=== Series 8 (2004) ===
No. overall	No. in series	Title	Directed by	Written by	Original release date	Viewers (millions)
15	1	"Blue Eiderdown (Part 1)"	Paul Unwin	Lynda La Plante	11 October 2004	7.62
A young prostitute, Angela Dutton, plunges to her death from the eleventh floor balcony of a block of flats. The team discover that she was the daughter of a seventies TV star who was also found murdered twelve years earlier, wrapped in a blue eiderdown, although the killer was never found.
16	2	"Blue Eiderdown (Part 2)"	Paul Unwin	Lynda La Plante	12 October 2004	6.38
Walker and Connor investigate seedy club owner Colin Thorpe (Colin Salmon), who was having a relationship with Dutton at the time of her death. A cover up involving a shady MP and the current DSI of the Vice Squad leads both Mike and Róisín into uncharted territory to find the killer.

=== Series 9 (2005) ===
No. overall	No. in series	Title	Directed by	Written by	Original release date	Viewers (millions)
17	1	"The Lovers (Part 1)"	Tristram Powell	Lynda La Plante	7 November 2005	8.99
David Harrington vanishes while on his honeymoon in London, leaving his wife Susan distraught and frantically searching for him. Her father contacts Walker, believing the police aren't taking the case seriously, but there's very little evidence to suggest foul play. However, Lisa's review into the CCTV surrounding his disappearance throws up a possible lead, in the form of a man with striking similarities to American serial killer Ted Bundy.
18	2	"The Lovers (Part 2)"	Tristram Powell	Lynda La Plante	8 November 2005	8.45
Tom Franke (Michael Feast) is brought to trial, only to plead innocent by way of insanity. Can Walker prove Franke is not insane?

=== Series 10 (2007) ===
No. overall	No. in series	Title	Directed by	Written by	Original release date	Viewers (millions)
19	1	"Sins of the Father (Part 1)"	Andy Hay	Lynda La Plante	14 January 2007	7.02
The apparently happy Harrogate family are torn apart when they return home to discover their eldest daughter, Emily, dead at the bottom of the cellar stairs. Connor and Satchell begin to sift through the case and discover that the family isn't as stable as it first appeared, especially Emily's step-father, John Harrogate (Greg Wise).
20	2	"Sins of the Father (Part 2)"	Andy Hay	Lynda La Plante	15 January 2007	7.28
Connor appeals to Walker for some backup, but Walker is having problems of his own with his son, Richard. The team identify Emily's ex-boyfriend Michael Sommerby (Andrew-Lee Potts) as a suspect, and close the net when vital evidence is found.
21	3	"Closure (Part 1)"	Edward Hall	Lynda La Plante	21 January 2007	6.06
Young school girl Madeline Fuller is raped and murdered in a disused pump house, but Connor and Satchell still have no leads or witnesses two months into the investigation. When Walker orders a review of unsolved cases, they turn up a string of similar cases of raped and murdered teenage girls over the last ten years, and the team find themselves searching for an apparent serial killer.
22	4	"Closure (Part 2)"	Edward Hall	Lynda La Plante	22 January 2007	5.85
When Connor opts to bring in a profiler, Max Stanford (Michael Brandon), Walker is initially dubious as to his involvement, but Connor soon uncovers the killer's identity, much to Walker's surprise.
23	5	"Paradise Lost (Part 1)"	Alex Pillai	Julie Dixon	28 January 2007	5.45
After the brutal murder of his girlfriend, Milton Jones is arrested on suspicion of her murder. Walker is convinced that Jones killed her under the influence of drugs, but he insists that another man was present in their flat. Connor discovers that a serial rapist is targeting the black community by raping white women with black boyfriends.
24	6	"Paradise Lost (Part 2)"	Alex Pillai	Julie Dixon	29 January 2007	6.21
Walker brings Milton on to the investigation to help, but this causes more problems than solutions. But could Connor's relationship with barrister Neil Dench (Adrian Lukis), who is working on the case, jeopardise the investigation and the subsequent trial?
25	7	"Curriculum Vitae (Part 1)"	Tristram Powell	Phillip Gladwin	4 February 2007	6.19
Young mother Susie McDonald (Victoria Hamilton) returns home from work to find her baby girl Poppy dead in her cot, and her nanny, Leanne, has vanished. The child's father, Matthew (Dominic Rowan) is no help to the case, having disappeared from Poppy's life many years ago.
26	8	"Curriculum Vitae (Part 2)"	Tristram Powell	Phillip Gladwin	5 February 2007	6.87
With Leanne on the run, and having used a fake CV to obtain her job in the first place, it seems an obvious conclusion that she is responsible for Poppy's death. However, when the trail leads to a second baby's death from two years previously, Walker believes he has a serial killer on his hands.
27	9	"Mirror Image (Part 1)"	Michael Whyte	Lynda La Plante	12 February 2007	7.40
The murder of Police Commander Jack Delaney and his wife Honor puts Walker, Connor and the team under pressure to get a quick result. Jewellery has been stolen from the house, which would indicate a burglary gone wrong, but several relatives profit from their deaths and so they focus the investigation on the family.
28	10	"Mirror Image (Part 2)"	Michael Whyte	Lynda La Plante	13 February 2007	6.21
Connor becomes suspicious of the identical twin sons in particular, and suspects that they may have worked together in order to get away with patricide. A key piece of evidence from their Aunt Nicole (Kim Thomson) proves to be Connor's key to unraveling the mystery.

=== Series 11 (2008) ===
DCI Connor takes leave in the episode "Conviction" and does not appear in the episode "The Box", returning in "Tracks". This was to accommodate actress Victoria Smurfit's pregnancy, as "The Box" was the first episode to be filmed.

No. overall	No. in series	Title	Directed by	Written by	Original release date	Viewers (millions)
29	1	"Rules of the Game (Part 1)"	David Moore	Dudi Appleton & Jim Keeble	17 January 2008	6.98
A suitcase is found abandoned at Heathrow Airport, and panic ensues, but it is soon discovered to be no terrorist threat. Inside is the naked body of Sofia Petrenko, a high-class prostitute, who has been strangled to death. The suitcase is traced to Vitali Malikov (Marcel Iureş), a Ukrainian billionaire who admits to hiring Sofia's services, but he claims she was alive when she left him.
30	2	"Rules of the Game (Part 2)"	David Moore	Dudi Appleton & Jim Keeble	24 January 2008	5.82
Walker arrests Malikov on suspicion of murder, but later has to release him, and soon realises he has become a pawn in a much bigger game. Connor discovers that Malikov may not have been involved after all.
31	3	"Kill the King (Part 1)"	Gillies MacKinnon	Christian Spurrier	31 January 2008	6.64
A well-known paediatric surgeon, Jonathan Carlisle, is found dead, and Connor uncovers a conflict which arise following a recent operation which resulted in a young girl's death. Walker soon discovers the girl's father, Gary Webster (John Lynch), was the subject of a restraining order issued by Carlisle, and that he had been stalking him for months.
32	4	"Kill the King (Part 2)"	Gillies MacKinnon	Christian Spurrier	7 February 2008	5.60
Webster disappears before he can be questioned, a game of cat and mouse ensuing, and he is eventually cornered, but this leads to further complications. However, Walker's attention soon turns to Adrian Lawson (Ben Miles), Carlisle's medical partner.
33	5	"Conviction (Part 1)"	Paul Wilmshurst	Julie Dixon	14 February 2008	5.28
Terry Dyer has been recently released from prison, where he was imprisoned for a crime he still maintains he did not commit, and he returns to his East London estate in search of the truth. The father of the victim he was convicted of killing, Ken Randle, confronts and wounds him. Walker is empathetic to Ken's situation and releases him on bail.
34	6	"Conviction (Part 2)"	Paul Wilmshurst	Julie Dixon	21 February 2008	4.64
Ken soon becomes doubtful of Dyer's guilt, growing convinced that a friend of his son's, Nick Fisher (Tom Ellis) was involved in his murder, and soon long-buried secrets are unearthed, leading to an unexpected twist.
35	7	"The Box (Part 1)"	Alex Pillai	Lynda La Plante	28 February 2008	4.95
Walker goes on leave and returns home to Glasgow, where he is taking care of his increasingly senile mother. However, he soon becomes involved in the case of a missing woman, who is the sister of an old friend. Walker begins to delve into the life of her then husband, dentist Kevin Reid (Jamie Sives), and discovers a dark bond between him and his brother Ronnie. Soon, a body is discovered and is it is proved to be the missing woman.
36	8	"The Box (Part 2)"	Alex Pillai	Lynda La Plante	13 March 2008	4.95
Kevin's second wife is reported missing – convincing Walker that one or both of the Reid brothers are involved in the crimes. Walker is paired with DI Moira Lynch (Kerry Fox).
37	9	"Tracks (Part 1)"	Tristram Powell	Dudi Appleton & Jim Keeble	20 March 2008	5.08
The body of a teenage girl, Maria Cole, is discovered in a chalk pit, and the tracks of three different vehicles are discovered at the crime scene. They eventually lead Connor and Walker to the local hardman, Ray Harper (Roy Marsden). His son Andy (Matthew Beard) and his friend Darren (Jason Maza) admit being at the pit on the same night, though they claim that they never saw the girl there.
38	10	"Tracks (Part 2)"	Tristram Powell	Dudi Appleton & Jim Keeble	27 March 2008	4.73
Cracks soon appear in Andy and Darren's story when CCTV footage reveals that they crossed paths with Maria before her death, later leading to the two boys being charged with her murder.

=== Series 12 (2009) ===
No. overall	No. in series	Title	Directed by	Written by	Original release date	Viewers (millions)
39	1	"Siren (Part 1)"	Julian Holmes	Damian Wayling	9 January 2009	6.29
An ambulance is run off the road, killing a paramedic, and the patient being transported inside is then shot three times by a masked gunman. The victim is revealed to be Sebastian Cole, the beau of media 'it-girl' Imogen Buller-Turi (Tamsin Egerton), which sparks a high media interest in the case, prompting Walker to intrude on Connor's investigation as it becomes clear that the murder is not a simple case of road rage.
40	2	"Siren (Part 2)"	Julian Holmes	Damian Wayling	16 January 2009	5.68
Walker discovers that Cole was involved in something much more sinister which resulted in his untimely death. DCI McGill (Vincent Regan) of the drugs squad then invades Connor's investigation.
41	3	"Ghost Train (Part 1)"	Stefan Schwartz	Jane Prowse	23 January 2009	5.92
A young girl falls from a ferris wheel to her death at the local fair, which is initially thought to be nothing more than a tragic accident. But then Satchell's aunt, who is a fortune teller at the fair, approaches the team saying she believes there is more to it. The number of accidents at the fair begins to rise. Before long a second death occurs, leading the team into a murder inquiry.
42	4	"Ghost Train (Part 2)"	Stefan Schwartz	Jane Prowse	30 January 2009	5.79
Young Tommy Gilbert (Martin Brody) is initially suspected of committing foul play, before Walker discovers that one of the fair's trusted employees may have been using his other part time job as a bargaining tool in blackmail.
43	5	"Shooter (Part 1)"	Ben Ross	Tony McHale	6 February 2009	6.00
A shop manager is shot during a jewellery raid, and an accomplice to the killers, Joe Miller, turns informer, revealing the culprits to be a notorious crime family – the Bilkins – but then he himself shot dead. Satchell witnesses the crime, and soon finds that his life and those of his family are in danger, but can find no safety from the influence of the crime family who wish to keep him silent.
44	6	"Shooter (Part 2)"	Ben Ross	Tony McHale	13 February 2009	5.55
When Satch's wife Kay (Ruth Gemmell) and daughter Abigail go missing, he becomes desperate. Donna Bilkin (Sally Dexter), using his weakness, leads Satch into a potentially life-threatening situation.
