= Margaret Leroy =

British novelist

Margaret Leroy (born November 1951) is a British romantic novelist. Her 1999 novel Trust was adapted for a British television film with a screenplay by Matthew Hall as Loving You in 2003.

She was brought up in the New Forest and studied music at St Hilda's College, Oxford.

Her subsequent novels include:

- The River House (2005)
- Yes, My Darling Daughter (2009)
- The Soldier's Wife (2011)
- A Brief Affair (2015)
