= New Street Law =

- Genre: Legal drama
- Written by: Matthew Hall; G.F. Newman
- Directed by: Various
- Starring: John Hannah; Paul Freeman; John Thomson; Lisa Faulkner; Chris Gascoyne; Penny Downie; Lee Williams
- Country of origin: United Kingdom
- Original language: English
- No. of seasons: 2
- No. of episodes: 14 (list of episodes)

Production
- Executive producers: Julie Gardner; Nicola Shindler; G. F. Newman
- Producer: Matthew Bird
- Production location: United Kingdom
- Running time: 60 minutes
- Production company: Red Picture Company

Original release
- Network: BBC One
- Release: 4 May 2006 – 4 April 2007

New Street Law is a British legal drama television series produced by Red Production Company in association with One-Eyed Dog Ltd for BBC One. The series was created by G. F. Newman and Matthew Hall, and starred an ensemble cast headed by John Hannah and Paul Freeman. Hannah and Freeman play Jack Roper and Laurence Scammel respectively, two barristers heading rival chambers in Manchester. Roper's chamber works in defence, while Scammel—Roper's one-time mentor—works for prosecution. A large supporting cast played members of Roper and Scammel's teams.

Filming on sets took place at Web Film Studios, Little Hulton, near Bolton. Location work was done on the streets of Manchester, Bolton and Rochdale. Other interior locations included the Bolton Masonic Hall, St John Street Chambers in Manchester, and a hospital in Rochdale. Although the second series did not air until February 2007, there was only a six-week gap between filming.

The first series aired in May and June 2006 in a pre-watershed timeslot on BBC One. The second series was moved to 9 p.m. Low ratings saw the last two episodes moved to a 10.40 p.m. timeslot. In July 2007, the cancellation of the series was announced. This left an unresolved cliffhanger from the second series, with the audience left unaware of whether Jack survived a car crash.

Acorn Media UK have released both series on DVD in Region 2. In Region 1, Entertainment One have released the entire series on DVD.

== Cast and characters ==
- John Hannah as Jack Roper
- Paul Freeman as Laurence Scammel QC
- John Thomson as Charlie Darling
- Lisa Faulkner as Laura Scammel
- Chris Gascoyne as Al Ware
- Penny Downie as Honor Scammel
- Lee Williams as Joe Stevens
- Lara Cazalet as Annie Quick
- Ace Bhatti as Ash Aslan
- Jayne Ashbourne as Sally Benn
- Don Warrington as Judge Ken Winyard
- Ben Owen-Jones as Chris Quick

== Episode list ==
=== Series 1 (2006) ===
No.	Title	Directed by	Written by	Original release date	Viewers (millions)
1	"Tempest"	Julian Holmes	Matthew Hall	4 May 2006	4.20
Jack Roper, with Joe Stevens as his junior, defends 15-year-old Katie Lewis, who is charged with arson. She is accused of purposely setting her father's house on fire after he had her boyfriend charged when he caught them in bed together. Laurence Scammel and his daughter Laura are acting for the prosecution. Katie is not very cooperative and refuses to provide instructions to her solicitor or the barristers. Jack believes she is protecting someone. Charlie Darling and Annie Quick defend Harry Jennings and Tina Bennett, who are accused of defrauding prospective investors of £40,000. The purchasers thought they were buying a flat, not shares in a property company. Charlie's tactics in the case don't sit well with Annie, however.
2	"For Friends and Family"	Julian Holmes	G.F. Newman	11 May 2006	Under 3.65
A cancer patient tries to sue the landfill company he used to work for and Jack and Annie represent him. Laura joins her father to defend the case, but she realises that not everyone has been telling the truth. Joe represents a woman accused of shoplifting. He gets more than he bargained for when he falls foul of her charms.
3	"To the Naked Eye"	Julian Holmes	Matthew Hall	18 May 2006	Under 3.92
Annie and Jack defend a man accused of murdering his wife, but there are problems when Laurence, the prosecutor, discovers foul play. Charlie is on the case of the suspected killers' sister, who battles her brother's in-laws for the custody of his child. A nurse's employers believe that a nurse lied to them about her qualifications. Joe is defending the nurse.
4	"A Pound of Flesh"	David Skynner	Chris Bucknall	25 May 2006	Under 3.64
Charlie gets a chance to show his skills when he represents a TV presenter in a high profile libel case. A man has been accused of physically abusing his son, but Jack is not happy about representing him and Honor resigns from prosecuting. However, it's discovered that there is more to the case than meets the eye.
5	"Shock to the System"	David Skynner	G.F. Newman	1 June 2006	Under 3.55
Charlie and Jack represent two police officers who are accused of torturing a terrorist suspect in custody. It is a highly emotive case as this incident has put the reputation of the police on the line. Joe has his own demons to overcome when he represents a patient seeking release from a psychiatric unit. However, his expert witness has a few surprises of his own.
6	"Quality of Life"	David Skynner	Michael Eaton	8 June 2006	Under 3.61
A woman seeks compensation after the botched delivery of her baby and Charlie and Annie are there to represent her. Laurence's friendship with the accused surgeon compromises the case and Laura is not happy at all. Jack has to use all of his expertise to help a Robbie Williams impersonator who has been accused of benefit fraud.
7	"High Risk, High Profit"	Emma Bodger	Matthew Hall	15 June 2006	Under 3.70
Jack represents a gang member who has been accused of shooting a police officer. It is his belief that his client has been framed, but he has trouble finding anyone with the courage to speak out against the leader of the gang. Joe is determined to prove himself in his first jury trial, but he takes huge risks with his clients liberty and it looks like he's pushed the law too far.
8	"Only the Young"	Emma Bodger	Matthew Hall	21 June 2006	Under 4.15
A young woman is accused of hiding evidence when her husband murdered a young boy and Jack is there to defend her. Annie and Charlie represent parties in a custody battle. Joe is not too happy, because he represents Sammy Dean, a serial shoplifter for the second time.

=== Series 2 (2007) ===
No.	Title	Directed by	Written by	Original release date	Viewers (millions)
1	"A Case of Morality"	Matthew Hall	David Skynner	21 February 2007	3.6
Jack is arrested for perverting the course of justice, and he is granted bail. Although he is guilty of the offence, he has stopped an innocent woman going to prison and so argues his moral innocence. Jack is convinced by the team to be represented by Frank Halcroft and Frank thinks up a plan to get Jack out of prison. Frank convinces Honor to use her contacts in the case, but all doesn't go according to plan when Laura is attacked. In the end, Jack receives a suspended sentence after an honest and moving speech in court. A female football agent is represented by Charlie and Joe. Annie breaks off her affair with Charlie in an attempt to save her marriage. Steve, Al's partner is sacked and Al asks for advice on whether he has a case for unfair dismissal.
2	"Lines Drawn"	James McIntyre	David Skynner	28 February 2007	Under 3.89
Jimmy McGregor, a gangster, asks Jack for help to defend him in a case for possession of heroin. However, McGregor has a violent past and Jack remembers when McGregor wasn't convicted for murder when he should have been. The key defence witness is McGregor's loyal wife, but Jack uncovers some revealing evidence. Afterwards, Jack is worried for McGregor's wife's safety and he isn't shocked when a body is found. Annie and Laura represent two opposite sides in the same case. Tommy claims that an angel told him to give £40,000 to charity, and Laura represents him. Annie represents his wife Claudia who has another idea why he did it. Laura spends the night with Jack, but she is unhappy when at the chambers dinner, he backs off and reverts to type.
3	"Holiday Playground"	Chris Bucknall	Clara Glynn	7 March 2007	3.00
Two girls are accused of murdering a class mate, so Jack and Frank represent them. The chances of winning are high, but they must decide whether to take their client's advice and trust them. Rebecca, a high-class hooker sues a plastic surgeon for loss of earnings after a bodged collagen injection left her with a "trout pout". Rebecca is represented by Charlie.
4	"Tomorrow's Fiction"	Matthew Hall	Clara Glynn	14 March 2007	Under 4.11
Jack and Laura represent a man who has been accused of rape 10 years ago. The case is emotional. A man is suing his son's school for banning sports day and Charlie is his representative. Charlie sees an opportunity for him to make up with his son.
5	"Love and Loss"	James McIntyre	Dominic Keavey	26 March 2007	Under 3.79
Al's boyfriend Steve is dead, which shocks Jack. A young boxer has Charlie and Annie defending him, but the judge wants to secure a conviction as he knows the victim.
6	"The Big Fish"	Matthew Hall	Dominic Keavey	4 April 2007	Under 3.64
The CPS are determined to label the killing of a burglar as racist, when Jack and Laura defend the accused defendant. Ray, Charlie's client, had his next door neighbour's dog bite off his testicle and he is prepared to sue.
