= Barbara Thorn =

British actress (born 1954)

- Born: 1954 (age 70–71)
- Occupation: Actress
- Notable work: The Bill

Barbara Thorn (born 1954) is an actress based in Britain.

She is known for playing the role of Inspector Christine Frazer in 64 episodes of the long running ITV drama The Bill and Rita "Coop" Cooper in the BBC legal drama series Judge John Deed.

In 1984 she featured in one episode of Love and Marriage and the BBC series The Tripods.

In 1987 she played Sheila Doel in 84 Charing Cross Road.

In 1988 she featured in one episode of the BBC series Grange Hill as a Computer Teacher and also played Doris in 3 episodes of Game, Set and Match.

From 1988 to 1990 she starred as Inspector Christine Frazer in 64 episodes of the long running ITV drama The Bill.

In 1990 she featured in one episode of TECX as Sarah.

In 1992 she featured in one episode of Hope It Rains as Muriel.

In 1994 she featured in one episode of Law and Disorder as Mrs Pope.

In 1995 she featured in one episode of the BBC series Pie in the Sky as Judith Ingleby.

In 1999 she featured in one episode of Holby City as Carole and starred in 5 episodes of the BBC series EastEnders as DI Steele.

In 2000 she featured in one episode of the BBC series Doctors as Jane Andrews.

From 1998 to 2003 she starred in 7 episodes of Trial & Retribution.

From 2001 to 2007 she starred in all 29 episodes of the BBC legal drama series Judge John Deed as Rita "Coop" Cooper.

In 2007 she featured in one episode of The Last Detective and the BBC series Doctors as Joyce Barker.

In 2017, Thorn shared her memories of making The Bill and other highlights of her career in a two-part special edition of The Bill Podcast.
