= Judge John Deed =

British television legal drama series (2001–2007)

- Series titles. The left panel shows Shaw and Seagrove's respective characters in a romantic moment.
- Genre: Legal drama
- Written by: G.F. Newman
- Starring: Martin Shaw; Jenny Seagrove; Barbara Thorn; Louisa Clein; Simon Ward
- Theme music composer: Debbie Wiseman
- Country of origin: United Kingdom
- Original language: English
- No. of series: 6
- No. of episodes: 29 (list of episodes)

Production
- Executive producers: Mal Young; Ruth Caleb
- Producer: G.F. Newman

Original release
- Network: BBC One; BBC HD (2007)
- Release: 9 January 2001 – 18 January 2007

Judge John Deed is a British legal drama television series produced by the BBC in association with One-Eyed Dog for BBC One. It was created by G.F. Newman and stars Martin Shaw as Mr Justice Deed, a High Court judge who tries to seek real justice in the cases before him. It also stars Jenny Seagrove as the barrister Jo Mills QC, frequently the object of Deed's desire. A pilot episode was broadcast on 9 January 2001, followed by the first full series on 26 November 2001. The sixth and last series concluded on 18 January 2007. The programme then went on an indefinite break after Shaw became involved in another television programme (Inspector George Gently), and he and Seagrove expressed a wish for the format of the series to change before they filmed new episodes. By 2009, the series had officially been cancelled.

The factual accuracy of the series is often criticised by legal professionals and journalists; many of the decisions taken by Deed are unlikely to happen in a real court. The romanticised vision of the court system created by Newman caused a judge to issue a warning to a jury not to let the series influence their view of trials—referring to an episode where Deed flouts rules when called up for jury service. A complaint was made by a viewer about one episode claiming biased and incorrect information about the MMR vaccine, leading the BBC to unilaterally ban repeats of it in its original form. All six series (with the exception of the two banned episodes from Series Five) have been released on DVD in the UK.

== Premise ==
Sir John Deed (played by Martin Shaw) is a recently appointed High Court judge who actively seeks justice in the cases before him, while at the same time trying to rekindle an old romance with former pupil Jo Mills QC (played by Jenny Seagrove), who regularly appears in his court. Deed is described by creator and writer G.F. Newman as a character who "speaks out against all the petty rules and bureaucracy that frustrates us all but that most of us don't speak out against". Because of Deed's unorthodox actions, he is often hampered in his pursuit of justice by several more conventional-minded characters, including his ex-wife, barrister Georgina "George" Channing QC (played by Caroline Langrishe); her father, Appeals Court Judge Lord Justice (Sir Joseph) Channing (played by Sir Donald Sinden); fellow High Court Judges Mr Justice (Sir Monty) Everard (played by Simon Ward) and Mr Justice (Sir Michael) Nivan (spelt as Niven in later series credits – played by Trevor Bowen); the Permanent Secretary to the Lord Chancellor's Department (LCD, later Department of Constitutional Affairs), Sir Ian Rochester (played by Simon Chandler); and later the Home Secretary Neil Haughton MP (played by Nick Reding and later Aneirin Hughes).

Other recurring characters include Deed's rebellious, animal rights activist daughter Charlie (played by Louisa Clein), who is initially a law student but later progresses to the courts; Deed's police friend, deputy assistant commissioner Row Colemore (played by Christopher Cazenove); and his clerk, Rita "Coop" Cooper (played by Barbara Thorn), who is often on hand to temper some of his more radical ideas. Rita "Coop" was involved in many scenes of the show and was shown frequently in Judge John Deed advertisements. The first three series of the programme have a self-contained structure, with a trial reaching its conclusion by the end of an episode. In later years, the series added a serialised format, with stories running over a number of episodes and a greater focus on the personal lives of characters other than Deed, with the main case concluding in each episode.

== Production ==
Newman devised his new series to highlight what he believed to be an out-of-touch judiciary and show "solutions" (a style that is different from, yet paradoxically similar to his previous work, such as his 1970s series Law and Order, which was heavily critical of the police, with Judge John Deed being heavily critical of the corrupt Establishment). Newman wrote the series intending to give the audience an exploration of the law without patronising them or getting caught up in an explanation of legal proceedings. A full series was commissioned before the pilot was broadcast. The series has been credited with renewing the "cop genre" by moving the story from a "maverick detective" to a high court judge, though as a comparison to Newman's previous work, a Guardian writer called it "rather soft" and doubted, from seeing the pilot, whether it would provoke questions in the House of Commons like Law and Order did, while the show went on to provoke much hostility from many groups which it portrayed as corrupt or negligent.

Sets were constructed on the soundstages at Bushey, Hertfordshire for the courtroom, Deed's chambers and the main characters' houses. Exterior court scenes were filmed at the Crown Court in Aylesbury. Location filming was also done at West Herts College for scenes in "My Daughter, Right or Wrong" (2006) and at various locations, including The Hague City Hall, (as film location for the International Criminal Court building in The Hague) for "War Crimes" (2007). The robes worn by Deed in the sixth series were authentic ones from Stanley Ley, a specialist legal outfitters, and cost £7,600. Theme music was composed for the series by Debbie Wiseman. The music, entitled "Judge John Deed", was performed by the Royal Philharmonic Orchestra and is described as a "stunning march-like theme that echoed throughout each of the programmes supplying pageantry to the Judge's sometimes-nefarious activities". It was released commercially on Wiseman's compilation album, Something Here, and as a single piece on online music retailers. From 2005 to 2007, television promotions for the series have been accompanied by the piano hook from "Sinnerman" by Nina Simone.

29 episodes were produced: the pilot, three series of four episodes, two series of six episodes and one series of two two-part serials. All episodes were written and produced, and occasionally directed, by Newman. At the time the sixth series concluded, the future of the series was in doubt; the BBC had announced an intention to use Martin Shaw in a range of new projects and it was apparent that the one-off adaption of Alan Hunter's Inspector Gently novels (starring Shaw as the eponymous inspector) would be commissioned for a full series. Jenny Seagrove clarified the situation, stating that the producers wanted to continue but she and Shaw were "taking a sabbatical" until the formula of the series was changed, implying that its future lay in the multi-part format introduced in series six. In April 2009, Shaw told BBC Breakfast that the series had been officially cancelled by the BBC because of financial cutbacks across the corporation. The six years the series was broadcast makes it the longest-running BBC legal drama.

== Broadcast ==
Judge John Deed regularly formed the backbone of the BBC One winter schedule. The pilot and first series were broadcast on Tuesdays at 8 p.m., with the second, third and fourth series moving to Thursdays (8:30 p.m. for the first two and 8 p.m. for the latter, though one episode in series three was postponed for over a month). The fifth series moved to Friday nights, and the sixth was shown two nights a week, with the first part of the story on Tuesday nights and concluding the following Thursday. This series was also the first to be simulcast on BBC HD. Occasionally, due to a clash with regional programming, it has aired at different times on BBC One Scotland; series two was delayed for sometimes over a week while series three began a half-hour earlier. Series five had a six-day delay.

Ratings for the series peaked with its first episode at 9.1 million but it continued to regularly draw in around 6 million viewers for later episodes. The series has been shown internationally by, amongst others, Canvas (Belgium), BBC Canada and BBC Prime. In 2004, Variety reported an American remake was set to be produced for NBC; Michael Chernuchin was to produce the series, which would follow a federal court judge in Washington, D.C. who would preside over terrorism and civil rights cases. There have been no further developments since the announcement was made in 2004.

== Reception ==
=== Depiction of law ===
Judge John Deed presents a fictionalised version of the English legal system. The British Film Institute's Screenonline notes that "Almost every week, Deed is seen presiding over cases being prosecuted by his ex-wife or defended by his on-off girlfriend (with occasionally help from his daughter)", highlighting how unlikely it would be for a real judge to have so many conflicts of interest in his court. It also notes that Deed's faults, such as his affairs with his therapist and with Francesca Rochester, prevent him from being "a completely idealised heroic figure", and the fact that because all of his family and friends practise law, he is firmly entrenched in the legal system that he is constantly fighting against. Deed has been accused of hypocrisy, particularly for using his connections to bail Charlie after she destroyed GM crops in "Exacting Justice". There is a belief in some legal circles that, although Judge John Deed is arguably the most unrealistic of contemporary legal dramas, viewers see Deed as an aspirational character taking on a corrupt establishment. Despite being picked apart by legal professionals, the cast and Newman were invited to the annual dinner of the Association of Women Barristers in 2006 as part of a drive to raise the profile and attract new members to the group.

The series' creative interpretation of the law has led to a misconception by the public of what real law is like (cf. CSI effect); in the second Damilola Taylor trial, the presiding judge warned the jury that if they copied Deed's actions in the then-recent episode "One Angry Man" (2006), in which Deed investigated a case and interviewed witnesses while sitting on a jury, they would "simply derail the whole process".

=== Critical reaction ===
The 2006 series caused controversy for the misguided information presented in "Silent Killer" (2006), which suggested a link between TETRA radio emissions and motor neurone disease. Statements were released by the TETRA Industry Group and the MND Association, the latter emphasising that while there is some evidence to suggest a link, it is not a single contributory factor. "Heart of Darkness" (2006) was criticised for portraying a causal link between the MMR vaccine and autism, and the BBC received complaints on the matter. The Editorial Complaints Unit ruled that the episode had contravened the BBC's "obligation of due impartiality on matters of public controversy" and that the episode would not be repeated in its original form. The episode was cited in From Seesaw to Wagon Wheel, an internal BBC report on impartiality in its output that was published in June 2007, a section of which highlighted that the name of the Westwake character bore more than a passing resemblance to that of Dr Andrew Wakefield.

"It would be all right if there was a programme about a maverick judge and how awful that is and why he's a twat and it shouldn't be allowed. But it's not about that, it's about how brilliant he is and how all judges, by implication, should be like that."

— David Mitchell's rant about the programme's "maverick judge" premise.

Television pundits have criticised the writing of the programme; Robert Hanks of The Independent calls the scripts "often corny, even painfully so", using Monty Everard's line "You'll come to regret crossing swords with me, sir!" from "Health Hazard" (2003) as an example. Hanks also wrote about what he called "moral oversimplification" of the storylines; the same episode featured "a wealthy and self-important businessman—who had already been banned from talking on a mobile phone while driving—ran over and killed a mother and her two small children while talking on his mobile phone to his mistress, to whom he was explaining that he had to take his wife to a function at—the icing on this shabby cake—Downing Street. He then legged it and subsequently faked mental illness to avoid a trial; a gambit that might have worked had Deed not cunningly threatened to send him to Broadmoor, at which point the man stood up and started protesting vociferously". The series is frequently lampooned for its dialogue and unlikely scenarios. Andy Hamilton called the dialogue "the funniest on TV" and David Mitchell selected it as his "TV hell" in the series TV Heaven, Telly Hell. Deed's "swashbuckling" persona has been satirised on the sketch series Dead Ringers. Despite the criticism given to the programme, the series is praised as being at its best when tackling topical issues, such as reality television, human exposure to telephone masts and incestuous relationships.

The production style also rates highly; writing in The Guardian, Mark Lawson called the pilot "glossier and more populist than Newman's earlier work". Wry reference is made to Deed and Jo's relationship, with Lawson writing that Deed "is desperate to conduct his own forensic investigation of the body fluids of the attractive defence QC". Writing on the programme's accessibility to an audience, Nancy Banks-Smith of The Guardian calls it "talkative in the way television plays used to be when they had something to say. But it is notable that, in a profession famous for obfuscation, Deed uses only the most pellucid English". Banks-Smith has also drawn attention to the masculine skew the programme has; "Judge John Deed […] is catnip to the ladies. These are chappishly called Georgie, Charlie, Jo and—when Rita defies abbreviation—Coop".

=== Awards and nominations ===
Stephen Roach received the Award of Merit at the 2005 Guild of Television Cameramen Awards for his work on the series. The series was nominated in the Diversity in Drama Production category at the 2006 Screen Nation Awards, though lost to an episode of Doctors.

== Home release ==
The first series was released as a 3-disc set on 8 May 2006 and the second series as a 2-disc set on 12 February 2007. The third and fourth series were released on 14 January 2008 in a 5-disc set. All the DVDs were published by 2 Entertain Video. A series 5 DVD was released on 8 February 2010, omitting the controversial fifth and sixth episodes. A Series 6 DVD was released on 21 February 2011, which contained two double length episodes.

The pilot and first series received a North American release on 9 March 2010.
