= Matthew Hall (writer) =

British screenwriter and novelist

Matthew Ronald Vickery Hall (born 1 May 1967) is a British screenwriter and novelist. He is sometimes credited as M. R. Hall.

== Education ==
Hall was educated at Hereford Cathedral School and Worcester College, Oxford (1985–88) where he graduated in law. He was called to the Bar in 1990 and practised as a barrister at 5 King's Bench Walk before becoming a full-time writer in 1995.

== Screenwriting career ==
He began his television career writing episodes of Kavanagh QC. In 1996/7 he created and wrote the legal series Wing and a Prayer which ran for two seasons and was the first drama production aired by the newly formed Channel 5. The series was nominated for a BAFTA in the best TV series category in 1997.

Hall's other screen credits include episodes of BBC1's Dalziel and Pascoe, The Scarlet Pimpernel, After Hours, Life Support and Holby City. ITV credits include episodes of A&E, Foyle's War, Blue Murder and the 2003 television film Loving You. He was the co-creator and lead writer of the BBC1 series New Street Law which aired in 2006/7.

=== Keeping Faith ===
Hall created and wrote the TV series Keeping Faith. The first season was produced in 2017 by Vox Pictures for BBC Wales and S4C. It was made in both the English and Welsh languages. The Welsh language version is entitled, Un Bore Mercher (One Wednesday Morning), and was first broadcast on S4C on 5 November 2017. In May 2018, during an interview with BBC Breakfast, Eve Myles (who stars as the eponymous "Faith") said that Hall was writing the scripts for a second season. Subsequently Keeping Faith was shown on BBC1, beginning on 10 July 2018. Matthew Hall received a Welsh BAFTA for the series, as best writer, in 2018. The second season was commissioned later that year and first aired in Welsh (with English sub-titles) on S4C on 12 May 2019 and in English on BBC One in July–August 2019. Hall has hinted that a third season is not beyond the bounds of possibility, and according to an announcement in January 2020 a third season is due to air in October 2020.

=== Coroner ===
CBC and Morwyn Brebner made an eight-part series, Coroner, based on Hall's The Coroner series of books (the Jenny Cooper novels). Starring Serinda Swan as the titular character, it aired in winter 2019 after production in summer 2018. The series premiered on CBC in January 2019, and attracted 1 million viewers per episode throughout the first season. The series was renewed for a second season. It was announced in May 2020 that a third season was to follow.

CBC announced the renewal of the series for a fourth season in June 2021. Production began on the 12-episode fourth season the next month, and it premiered in January 2022.

== Novels ==
Hall's first novel, The Coroner, was published by PanMacmillan in 2009. His second novel, The Disappeared, was published in January 2010 in the UK and in December 2009 in the US. The Coroner was shortlisted for the Crime Writers' Association Gold Dagger awarded to the best crime novel of 2009. His third novel, The Redeemed, is published by PanMacmillan in April 2011. His fourth novel, The Flight, was shortlisted for the Crime Writers' Association Gold Dagger in 2012.

=== Jenny Cooper novels ===
1. The Coroner (2009)
2. The Disappeared (2009)
3. The Redeemed (2011)
4. The Flight (2012)
5. The Chosen Dead (2013)
6. The Burning (2014)
7. A Life To Kill (2017)
8. The Innocent (2012) (Short story)

=== Further novels ===
The Black Art of Killing was published in April 2020.

Hall's new novel Totem, a legal thriller set in the forest wilderness of Western Canada, will be published by Eye Books in May 2026.

== Masterclasses ==
Matthew Hall has tutored on writing crime fiction as a 'Guardian Masterclasses' event together with William Ryan (whose Captain Korolev Novels have been shortlisted for numerous awards).

== Family ==
Hall is the son of Ian Hall, formerly a member of the Philharmonia Orchestra, and Rebecca Hughes-Hall. He is married to Patricia Carswell, a freelance journalist. They have two sons. His youngest son Will died at the age of 23. He lives in the village of Welsh Newton Common and is church warden of St Mary the Virgin, Welsh Newton.

== Awards ==
BAFTA Cymru - Keeping Faith, Best Writer 2018 (winner)

Crime Writers' Association - Gold Dagger 2012 (nomination for The Flight)

Crime Writers' Association - Gold Dagger 2009 (nomination for The Coroner)

RTS Midlands - Dalziel and Pascoe (Walls of Silence), Best Drama 2001 (winner, as writer)

BAFTA - Wing and a Prayer, Best Drama Series 1997 (nomination, as writer/creator)
