= Circle of Poison =

Export of illegal pesticides

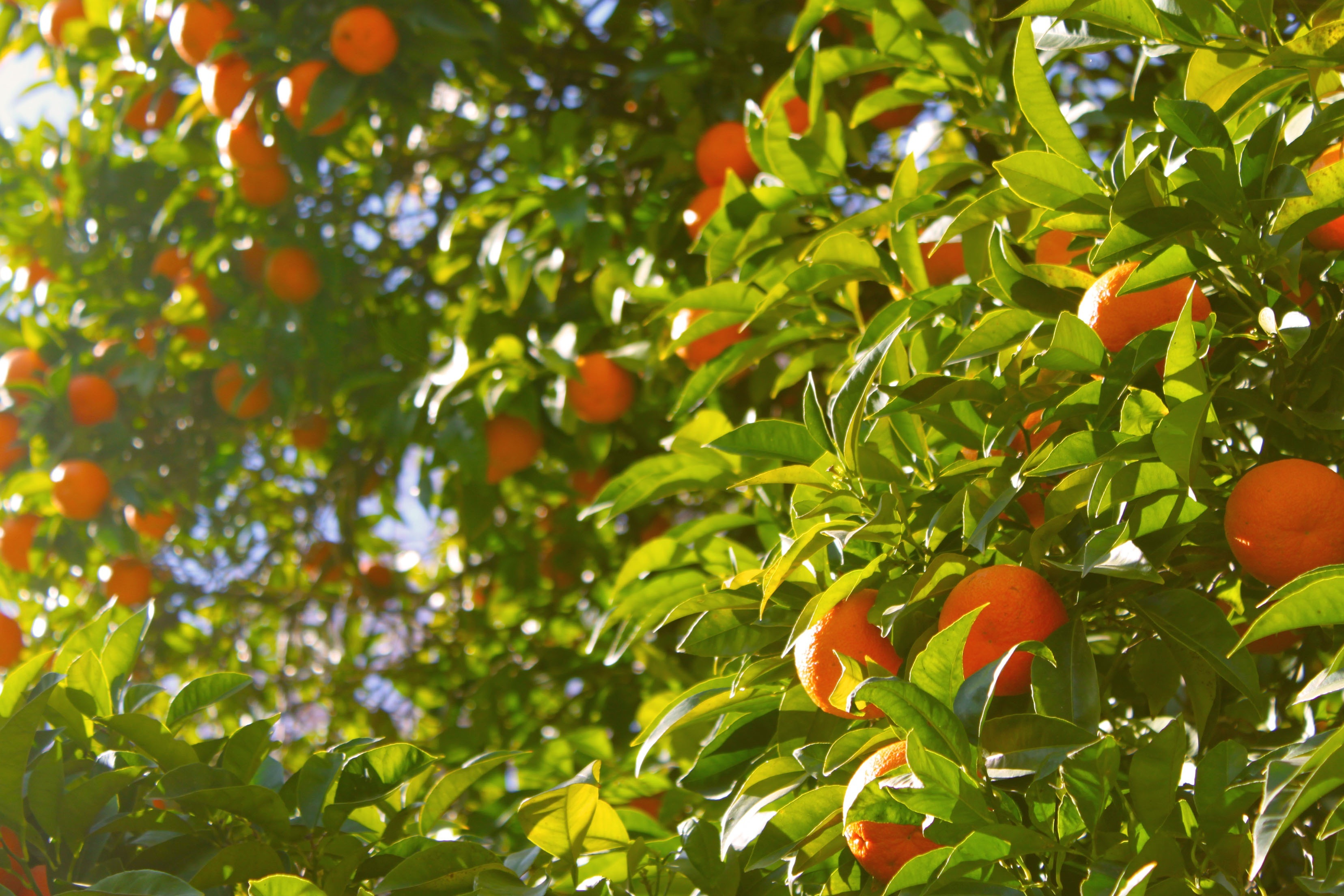
Oranges are a cash crop that are treated with Imazalil (Enilconazole), a systemic fungicide used to control a wide range of fungi on fruit. In July 1999, the EPA classified Imazalil as "likely to be carcinogenic in humans," in the Draft Guidelines for Carcinogenic Risk Assessment. In a survey conducted by Pesticide Action Network (PAN), they found that more than 5% of fruit, vegetables and other foods carried harmful pesticide residues which posed "appreciable" health risks to consumers. Imazalil, exceeded the safe limit on 79% of oranges sampled.

The Circle of Poison (COP) refers to the export of domestically banned pesticides for use on foods elsewhere, some of which returns by way of import. The "circle" is complete when the toxic chemicals that were exported are then used to grow fruit, meat, and produce that are imported and available for domestic consumption. This circle was first identified relative to the United States but the relationship also exists between other nations of the Global North and South.

== History of concept ==
In the book, Circle of Poison: Pesticides and People in a Hungry World, David Weir and Mark Schapiro of the Oakland-based Center for Investigative Reporting present an investigative study of how certain dangerous chemicals, which are banned in the U.S., still enter back into the United States and the American diet through food imports. Many restricted chemicals, especially pesticides, are produced in the U.S. and exported to the global south. The banned chemicals are then used on 'cash crops', which are subsequently exported to the U.S. and other industrialized countries for high profit.

The investigative study done by Wier and Schapiro showed that the highly potent and dangerous chemicals used in domestic agriculture led to a public clamor for strict regulations, and that pesticides contribute to the expansion of an export-oriented agriculture at the expense of food production for local needs. Even where they are applied to food crops, pesticides are often linked to the Green Revolution, which can mean more hunger even while it raises production. Pesticides, they argue, are no solution to hunger-they bypass the needs of the poor who 'have neither money to buy food nor the land to grow it on'. Moreover, they claim because agrochemical companies are profit driven, they have tailored the regulations to permit unrestricted export of dangerous chemicals. Wier and Schapiro argue that this loophole has been a disaster.

== Circle of Poison Prevention Act of 1991 ==
In April 1991, the "Circle of Poison prevention Act" was introduced by Senator Patrick Leahy (D-VT) in the U.S. Senate and by Representatives Mike Synar (D-OK) and Leon Panetta (D-CA) in the House. This bill would have placed strict controls on exports of hazardous chemicals. Similar legislation passed both houses of Congress but died in conference committee.

In brief, the "Circle of Poison Prevention Act" would have:

- Prohibited the export of pesticides that were not registered for domestic use; were not registered for food use and would not be exported for use on food; or had had the majority of registration canceled.
- Permitted government to refuse the import of certain hazardous pesticides, including restricted-use pesticides and those which were conditionally registered or were the subject of cancellation proceedings.
- Permitted citizens to file suit against violators to enforce the law.
- Automatically revoked tolerances for pesticide residues on food for pesticides no longer registered in the U.S.
- Required EPA to disseminate information on non-chemical pest control alternatives and sponsored meetings to develop improved strategies for sustainable agriculture, including integrated pest management and the use of non-chemical alternatives.

== Pesticide regulations ==
The United States Environmental Protection Agency (EPA) has the authority to regulate the sale and use of pesticides in the United States; before a pesticide can be sold, it must be licensed or registered by the EPA. While registration does not constitute "approval" by the EPA, it means that the agency has determined that a pesticide will not cause 'unreasonable adverse effects' on humans or the environment. The EPA may cancel or suspend the registration of a pesticide, if further evidence indicates that its use poses unreasonable hazard. Or it may restrict the uses for which it may be sold to very specific crops and application practices.

The EPA does not have the authority to prohibit the export of canceled or suspended pesticides; nor may it forbid the export of restricted use pesticides that may be equally hazardous in the hands of untrained applicators or new compounds, which have never been granted registration. Consequently, millions of pounds of pesticides, which have been determined to be unsafe for use in the U.S., are shipped to foreign ports.

== Federal pesticide laws ==
The Federal Insecticide, Fungicide, and Rodenticide Act (FIFRA), and the Federal Food, Drug, and Cosmetic Act, are the two major laws responsible for pesticide control in the U.S. Department of Agriculture, and are also responsible for the safety of foods containing pesticide residues to the Department of Health, Education, and Welfare. The Secretary has delegated this responsibility to the Food and Drug Administration.
