= Nathalie Younglai =

Canadian writer, director, producer, and harpist

- Education: Humber College
- Occupations: Writer, Director, Producer, Harpist
- Children: 1

Nathalie Younglai is a Canadian writer, director, producer, and harpist. She is the founder of BIPOC (Black, Indigenous and People of Colour) TV & Film. She was the writing mentor for the Reel Asian Film Festival's Unsung Voices summer workshop for youth and speaker at Reel Asian's 2012 industry series.

She is currently a creator optioned with Entertainment One and is currently a writer for TV series Coroner.

She studied TV writing and producing at a post-graduate program at Humber College in Toronto, ON, Canada.

== Filmography ==
=== Television series ===
Younglai began her career in television show production and writing. In 2006, Younglai began her work for Canadian TV series Til Debt Do Us Part (Slice CNBC) with research for 22 episodes and miscellaneous crew for 48 episodes until 2008. In 2009, she edited the story for 2 episodes. From 2008 to 2011, she directed 15 episodes. In 2010 to 2012, she directed 9 episodes for Prince$$ (Slice CNBC). In 2011, she was the field director of Top Chef Canada (season 2) (Food Network Canada).

=== Shorts ===
Younglai was the executive producer, writer, and director of her first short "Corrugated Violin" in 2010. Then she directed science fiction/drama short "The Sound That Broke the Silence," which premiered at the 2013 ReelWorld Film Festival and was one of the ACTRA Young Emerging Actors Assembly (YEAA) showcase. She is also the director of "Super Zee", an action-comedy short about a queer black hero.

=== Films ===
She is a co-writer for Korean Canadian comedy film Stand Up Man, which was fully funded on Indiegogo on August 13, 2016. Stand Up Man is filmed in Windsor, Ontario and Toronto. The film is directed by Aram Collier and produced by Tony Lau.

== Prizes ==
Younglai was selected to participate in the 2011 Writers Guild of Canada-Bell Media Diverse Screenwriters Program. She was awarded a 2013 Ontario Arts Council playwriting grant and the 2012 Global Writers Apprenticeship. The Toronto Screenwriting Conference named Younglai as one of 5 emerging writer recipients of the 2013 Telefilm New Voices Award.

== Musical career ==
Since February 1992, Younglai has composed, performed and recorded as the harpist in duo with flutist Catherine Richardson. Younglai and Richardson have been featured as guest artists at numerous concerts, such as the Les Concerts Ponticello in Gatineau, St. Matthews’ Christmas Magic Candlelight Concert, St. Paul's Celtic Christmas concert, and the Circle of Harmony's Christmas Concert in 2008. They also sponsor the Variante Harp & Flute Duo Scholarship for the Burlington Rotary Musical Festival.

Younglai started playing Suzuki violin at age 4 and the Suzuki harp at age 12 under Marie Lorcini. As a harpist, she achieved awards including the Toronto Kiwanis Scholarship and the Lee Hepner Award for musical excellence. She soloed with the Hamilton Philharmonic Youth Orchestra, and the Guelph Chamber Orchestra, and played with Te Deum Chamber Orchestra, the Hamilton Philharmonic, Symphony Hamilton, the Toronto Youth Wind Ensemble, and the Guelph Concert Band. Younglai created the soundtrack for a documentary about the Young Offender's Act. Nathalie has taught music at the Hamilton Suzuki school of Music, the Halton Waldorf School, as well as privately.

== Personal life ==
Younglai lives in Toronto, ON, Canada.

Nathalie's writing has been published in the Globe and Mail, the Hamilton Spectator and Amöi magazine.
